= List of Middlesex County Cricket Club players =

This is a list in alphabetical order of cricketers who have played for Middlesex County Cricket Club in top-class matches since the club was formally constituted in February 1864. Like the Middlesex county teams formed by earlier organisations from the early 18th century, the county club has always held first-class status. It has held List A status since the beginning of limited overs cricket in 1963 and has been a top-class Twenty20 team since the inauguration of the Twenty20 Cup in 2003.

The details are the player's usual name followed by the years in which he was active as a Middlesex player and then his name is given as it usually appears on match scorecards. Note that many players represented other top-class teams besides Middlesex and some players, such as Nick Compton, left the county but later returned. Current players are shown as active to the latest season in which they played for the club. Players who represented the county before 1864 are included if they also played for the county club but excluded if not. All players known to have represented the county before the formation of the county club are included in List of Middlesex county cricketers to 1863.

== Key ==
- † preceding a player's name means that the original article is now a redirect to this list.

== A ==
- David Abbey (1967) : D. R. Abbey
- Abdul Razzaq (2002–2003) : Abdul Razzaq
- Ashton Agar (2018) : A. C. Agar
- Ajit Agarkar (2004) : A. B. Agarkar
- Ahsan-ul-Haq (1902) : Ahsan-ul-Haq
- Frederick Alexander (1951) : F. R. Alexander
- Jim Alldis, Jr. (1970) : J. S. Alldis
- Gubby Allen (1921–1950) : G. O. B. Allen
- David Alleyne (2001–2002) : D. Alleyne
- William Anderson (1891) : W. B. Anderson
- Martin Andersson (2018–2023) : M. K. Andersson
- Tom Angus (1956–1957) : T. Angus
- Rupert Anson (1910–1914) : R. Anson
- Richard Arden-Davis (1881) : R. Arden-Davis
- William Ashmore (1946–1947) : W. S. Ashmore
- Bernard Atkinson (1933–1934) : B. G. W. Atkinson
- Geoffrey Atkinson (1930) : G. B. Atkinson
- Nigel Atkinson (1923) : N. S. M. Atkinson
- John Atkinson-Clark (1930–1932) : J. C. Atkinson-Clark

== B ==
- Lucas Bacmeister (1889–1890) : L. H. Bacmeister
- George Bailey (2016) : G. J. Bailey
- Edward Baily (1872) : E. P. Baily
- Clare Baker (1906–1912) : C. V. Baker
- George Baker (1872) : G. D. Baker
- Andrew Balbirnie (2012–2015) : A. Balbirnie
- Dennis Baldry (1953–1958) : D. O. Baldry
- Ethan Bamber (2018–2024) : E. R. Bamber
- Tom Barber (2018–2019) : T. E. Barber
- Graham Barlow (1969–1986) : G. D. Barlow
- Freeman Barnardo (1939) : F. F. T. Barnardo
- Alex Barnett (1988–1991) : A. A. Barnett
- Alfred Bashford (1906) : A. M. Bashford
- John Bastow (1874–1877) : J. Bastow
- Henry Bates (1909) : H. A. Bates
- James Bates (1880) : J. Bates
- Lawrence Bathurst (1894–1895) : L. C. V. Bathurst
- Christopher Batt (1998–2000) : C. J. Batt
- Arthur Baxter (1938) : A. D. Baxter
- Robert Bayford (1864) : R. A. Bayford
- Ian Bedford (1947–1962) : P. I. Bedford
- Cyril Beldam (1896) : C. A. Beldam
- Ernest Beldam (1903–1907) : E. A. Beldam
- George Beldam (1900–1907) : G. W. Beldam
- Ronald Bell (1952–1954) : R. V. Bell
- Herbert Benka (1933–1936) : H. F. Benka
- Tris Bennett (1926–1927) : C. T. Bennett
- Don Bennett (1950–1969) : D. Bennett
- William Benthall (1864–1868) : W. H. Benthall
- William Benton (1913) : W. M. Benton
- Seton Beresford (1909) : S. R. D. H. Beresford
- Gareth Berg (2008–2014) : G. K. Berg
- John Berners (1904) : J. A. Berners
- Sid Beton (1923–1928) : S. L. Beton
- Reginald Bettington (1928) : R. H. B. Bettington
- Melvyn Betts (2004–2006) : M. M. Betts
- Morton Betts (1872) : M. P. Betts
- Bob Beveridge (1930–1934) : R. Beveridge
- John Bevington (1900) : J. C. Bevington
- Timothy Bevington (1900–1904) : T. A. D. Bevington
- Donald Bick (1954–1967) : D. A. Bick
- William Birch (1887) : W. Birch
- George Bird (1872–1877) : G. Bird
- Wilfred Bird (1905–1908) : W. S. Bird
- Arthur Bishop (1883) : A. T. Bishop
- Sam Black (1970–1973) : C. J. R. Black
- Ian Blanchett (1997–1999) : I. N. Blanchett
- Timothy Bloomfield (1997–2004) : T. F. Bloomfield
- John Boak (1873) : J. Boak
- David Boden (1989) : D. J. P. Boden
- Kildare Borrowes (1882) : K. D. Borrowes
- Bernard Bosanquet (1898–1919) : B. J. T. Bosanquet
- Bertrand Bosworth-Smith (1895) : B. N. Bosworth-Smith
- John Bowstead (1909) : J. Bowstead
- Joseph Box (1864–1868) : J. W. Box
- Dwayne Bravo (2018) : D. J. Bravo
- Edward Bray (1895–1906) : E. H. Bray
- Horace Brearley (1949) : H. Brearley
- Mike Brearley (1961–1983) : J. M. Brearley
- Hugh Bromley-Davenport (1896–1898) : H. R. Bromley-Davenport
- Henry Brookes (2024–2025) : H. J. H. Brookes
- Paul Brooks (1939) : P. W. Brooks
- Gary Brown (1986) : G. K. Brown
- Keith Brown (1984–1998) : K. R. Brown
- Michael Brown (1999–2003) : M. J. Brown
- Syd Brown (1937–1955) : S. M. Brown
- George Browne (1864) : G. F. Browne
- Clarence Bruce, 3rd Baron Aberdare (1908–1929) : C. N. Bruce
- Charles Brune (1866–1875) : C. J. Brune
- Frank Bryan (1891) : F. Bryan
- Herbert Bryant (1888–1889) : H. W. Bryant
- Edward Buckland (1885–1888) : E. H. Buckland
- Francis Buckland (1877–1878) : F. M. Buckland
- Charles Buller (1865–1877) : C. F. Buller
- Charles Bulpett (1880) : C. W. L. Bulpett
- Walter Bunting (1877) : W. H. Bunting
- Gerard Burge (1885) : G. R. Burge
- Arthur Burghes (1876–1877) : A. Burghes
- Joe Burns (2015) : J. A. Burns
- David Burton (2008–2009) : David Burton
- Geoffrey Burton (1930) : G. C. Burton
- George Burton (1881–1893) : G. Burton
- Leonard Burtt (1921) : L. L. Burtt
- Roland Butcher (1974–1990) : R. O. Butcher
- Edward Butler (1885) : E. M. Butler
- John Butterworth (1925) : J. C. Butterworth
- Reginald Butterworth (1935–1937) : R. E. C. Butterworth
- Robert Buxton (1906–1909) : R. V. Buxton

== C ==
- Charles Calvert (1865–1866) : C. V. Calvert
- Ian Campbell (1900) : J. M. Campbell
- Ernest Canning (1929–1931) : E. G. Canning
- Bob Caple (1959) : R. G. Caple
- John Carr (1983–1996) : J. D. Carr
- Bertram Carris (1937–1939) : B. D. Carris
- Harold Carris (1928–1933) : H. E. Carris
- Hilton Cartwright (2018) : H. W. R. Cartwright
- Thomas Case (1864–1868) : T. Case
- Charles Cater (1866–1867) : C. A. Cater
- William Catling (1864–1865) : W. Catling
- Arthur Childs-Clarke (1923–1934) : A. W. Childs-Clarke
- Harry Chinnery (1899–1902) : H. B. Chinnery
- Jack Chisholm (1947) : J. R. Chisholm
- Stuart Clark (2004–2005) : S. R. Clark
- Ted Clark (1959–1976) : E. A. Clark
- Peter Clarke (1913–1914) : P. Clarke
- William Clarke (1880–1884) : W. B. Clarke
- Frank Clifford (1921) : F. L. Clifford
- Ernie Clifton (1962–1966) : E. G. Clifton
- Humphry Cobb (1898–1901) : H. H. Cobb
- Toby Colbeck (1906–1908) : L. G. Colbeck
- A. Cole (1879) : A. Cole (Note: Cole played in three first-class matches in 1879, two for Middlesex and one for a United London XI. He took three wickets and scored 45 runs in these matches and is known to have played for several other teams between 1867 and 1886, including Essex and MCC. A member of the MCC ground staff at Lord's, other than a surname and initial no biographical details are known.)
- Pedro Collins (2010) : P. T. Collins
- William Collins (1892) : W. R. Collins
- John Collinson (1939) : J. Collinson
- Corey Collymore (2011–2013) : C. D. Collymore
- Denis Compton (1936–1958) : D. C. S. Compton
- Leslie Compton (1938–1956) : L. H. Compton
- Nick Compton (2001–2017) : N. R. D. Compton
- Joseph Connaughton (1939) : J. M. F. Connaughton
- Alan Connolly (1969–1970) : A. N. Connolly
- Arthur Coode (1898) : A. T. Coode
- Colin Cook (1981–1984) : C. R. Cook
- Simon Cook (1997–2004) : S. J. Cook
- Bransby Cooper (1864–1867) : B. B. Cooper
- Rustom Cooper (1949–1951) : R. S. Cooper
- Terence Cordaroy (1968) : T. M. Cordaroy
- Harry Cornish (1893) : H. H. Cornish
- Noah Cornwell (2024) : N. B. Cornwell
- Clement Cottrell (1876–1885) : C. E. Cottrell
- Fred Covington (1936) : F. E. Covington
- Norman Cowans (1980–1993) : N. G. Cowans
- Maurice Coxhead (1911) : M. E. Coxhead
- Joe Cracknell (2021–2023) : J. B. Cracknell
- Cosmo Crawley (1929) : C. S. Crawley
- Matthew Creese (1999) : M. L. Creese
- Steven Crook (2011–2012) : S. P. Crook
- Gordon Crosdale (1905) : G. Crosdale
- Edward Crutchley (1947) : E. Crutchley
- Gerry Crutchley (1910–1930) : G. E. V. Crutchley
- Blake Cullen (2020–2022) : B. C. Cullen
- Thomas Cuming (1913) : T. Cuming
- Miguel Cummins (2019–2020) : M. L. Cummins
- Foster Cunliffe (1897–1903) : F. H. E. Cunliffe
- Geoffrey Cuthbertson (1921–1927) : G. B. Cuthbertson

== D ==
- John Dale (1874–1878) : J. W. Dale
- Hugh Dales (1920–1930) : H. L. Dales
- Lord Dalmeny senior (1902) : Lord Dalmeny
- Lord Dalmeny junior (1929–1931) : Lord Dalmeny
- Jamie Dalrymple (1999–2011) : J. W. M. Dalrymple
- Arthur Daly (1866) : A. R. Daly
- Arthur Daniel (1864–1869) : A. W. T. Daniel
- Wayne Daniel (1977–1988) : W. W. Daniel
- Maurice Dauglish (1886–1890) : M. J. Dauglish
- Josh Davey (2010–2013) : J. H. Davey
- Jack Davies (2020–2025) : J. L .B. Davies
- Joe Dawes (2003) : J. H. Dawes
- Kenneth Day (1959) : K. B. Day
- Josh de Caires (2021–2024) : J. M. de Caires
- Percy de Paravicini (1881–1892) : P. J. de Paravicini
- AB De Villiers (2019) : A. B. De Villiers
- Peter Delisle (1954–1957) : G. P. S. Delisle
- Reg Deller (1951–1953) : R. P. Deller
- Joe Denly (2012–2014) : J. L. Denly
- Louis Devereux (1949) : L. N. Devereux
- John Dewes (1948–1956) : J. G. Dewes
- Neil Dexter (2009–2015) : N. J. Dexter
- J. T. Dixon (1908) : J. T. Dixon (Note: An amateur who had previously played in Hong Kong, Dixon made a single first-class appearance for Middlesex in 1908. Other than a surname and initials no biographical details are known.)
- Graham Doggart (1925) : A. G. Doggart
- Len Dolding (1951) : D. L. Dolding
- Mordaunt Doll (1912–1919) : M. H. C. Doll
- Martin Donnelly (1946) : M. P. Donnelly
- Archie Douglas (1902) : A. P. Douglas
- James Douglas (1893–1913) : J. Douglas
- Robert Noel Douglas (1898–1905) : R. N. Douglas
- Sholto Douglas (1906) : S. Douglas
- Paul Downton (1980–1991) : P. R. Downton
- Colin Drybrough (1958–1964) : C. D. Drybrough
- Lord Dunglass (1924–1925) : Lord Dunglass
- Frederick Dunkley (1886–1888) : F. J. Dunkley
- Leus du Plooy (2024–2025) : J. L. du Plooy
- Patrick Durlacher (1921–1923) : P. N. Durlacher
- Jack Durston (1919–1933) : F. J. Durston
- Keith Dutch (1993–2000) : K. P. Dutch

== E ==
- Jim Eaglestone (1947) : J. T. Eaglestone
- Charles Ebden (1905) : C. H. M. Ebden
- Phil Edmonds (1971–1992) : P. H. Edmonds
- Bill Edrich (1937–1958) : W. J. Edrich
- Philip Edwards (1930–1933) : P. G. Edwards
- Ricardo Ellcock (1989–1991) : R. M. Ellcock
- Richard Ellis (1982–1984) : R. G. P. Ellis
- John Emburey (1973–1995) : J. E. Emburey
- Tom Enthoven (1925–1936) : H. J. Enthoven
- Stephen Eskinazi (2015–2025) : S. S. Eskinazi
- Sydney Etheridge (1908–1910) : S. G. Etheridge
- Bill Etherington (1946) : M. W. Etherington
- Danny Evans (2007–2010) : D. Evans

== F ==
- Alan Fairbairn (1947–1951) : A. Fairbairn
- Gordon Fairbairn (1919) : G. A. Fairbairn
- Colin Fairservice (1936) : C. Fairservice
- Paul Farbrace (1990–1995) : P. Farbrace
- Ricky Fay (1995–1996) : R. A. Fay
- Norman Featherstone (1968–1979) : N. G. Featherstone
- Mark Feltham (1993–1996) : M. A. Feltham
- Robert Felton (1935–1948) : R. Felton
- Nathan Fernandes (2024–2025) : N. S. Fernandes
- Edwin Field (1904–1906) : E. Field
- Steven Finn (2005–2021) : S. T. Finn
- Paul Fisher (1978–1979) : P. B. Fisher
- Robert Allan Fitzgerald (1864) : R. A. Fitzgerald
- Michael Flanagan (1873–1878) : M. Flanagan
- Stephen Fleming (2001) : S. P. Fleming
- Cyril Foley (1893–1906) : C. P. Foley
- David Follett (1995–1996) : D. Follett
- Augustus Ford (1879–1882) : A. F. J. Ford
- Francis Ford (1886–1899) : F. G. J. Ford
- Neville Ford (1932) : N. M. Ford
- William Ford (1879–1894) : W. J. Ford
- Basil Foster (1912) : B. S. Foster
- Archie Fowler (1921–1930) : A. J. B. Fowler
- Thomas Fox (1905) : T. S. Fox
- Arthur Francis (1880) : A. S. Francis
- Charles Francis (1875–1877) : C. K. Francis
- Francis Francis (1881) : F. P. Francis
- James Franklin (2015–2017) : J. E. C. Franklin
- Alastair Fraser (1986–1988) : A. G. J. Fraser
- Angus Fraser (1984–2002) : A. R. C. Fraser
- John Frederick (1864) : J. S. Frederick
- James Fuller (2016–2018) : J. K. Fuller

== G ==
- Bob Gale (1956–1965) : R. A. Gale
- Ben Gannon (2003) : B. W. Gannon
- Mike Gatting (1974–1998) : M. W. Gatting
- Ben Geddes (2025) : B. B. A. Geddes
- Walter Gilbert (1873–1874) : W. R. Gilbert
- William Gilby (1872) : W. Gilby
- James Gilman (1900–1901) : J. Gilman
- Billy Godleman (2005–2009) : B. A. Godleman
- Cecil Gold (1907) : C. A. Gold
- Yogesh Golwalkar (2005) : Y. A. Golwalkar
- Larry Gomes (1973–1976) : H. A. Gomes
- David Goodchild (1996–1999) : D. J. Goodchild
- Lord Bernard Gordon-Lennox (1903) : Lord B. C. Gordon-Lennox
- Ian Gould (1975–1996) : I. J. Gould
- Cyril Gray (1925–1927) : C. D. Gray
- Laurie Gray (1934–1951) : L. H. Gray
- Theophilus Greatorex (1883–1892) : Rev T. Greatorex
- Charles Green (1868–1879) : C. E. Green
- John Green (1919) : J. J. Green
- John Gregory (1865) : J. C. Gregory
- Arthur Griffin (cricketer) (1910) : A. W. M. S. Griffin
- Gerard Griffin (1900–1903) : G. S. F. Griffin
- Algernon Griffiths (1871–1872) : A. S. Griffiths
- Nick Gubbins (2014–2021) : N. R. T. Gubbins
- John Guise (1922–1934) : J. L. Guise
- Churchill Gunasekara (1919–1922) : C. H. Gunasekara

== H ==
- Aftab Habib (1992) : A. Habib
- Alexander Hadow (1872) : A. A. Hadow
- Edward Hadow (1883–1893) : E. M. Hadow
- Frank Hadow (1873–1874) : P. F. Hadow
- Walter Hadow (1870–1879) : W. H. Hadow
- Nigel Haig (1912–1934) : N. E. Haig
- John Haines (1865–1867) : J. Haines
- John Hake (1948) : G. J. G. Hake
- Percy Hale (1900) : P. W. Hale
- Warren Hale (1893) : W. S. Hale
- Charles Hall (1867) : C. Hall
- Ernest Halliwell (1901) : E. A. Halliwell
- Richard Halliwell (1865–1871) : R. B. Halliwell
- Tom Hampton (2010) : T. R. G. Hampton
- Peter Handscomb (2021–2022) : P. S. P. Handscomb
- Kenneth Harper (1910) : K. B. Harper
- William Harrington (1946–1948) : W. J. R. Harrington
- Gordon Harris (1994) : G. A. R. Harris
- James Harris (2013–2021) : J. A. R. Harris
- Mike Harris (1964–1968) : M. J. Harris
- Jason Harrison (1994–1996) : J. C. Harrison
- Philip Harrison (1906–1911) : W. P. Harrison
- George Hart (1926–1939) : G. E. Hart
- Edmund Harvey (1872) : E. Harvey
- Shearman Haslip (1919) : S. M. Haslip
- Frederick Hawkins (1927) : F. A. Hawkins
- James Haycraft (1885) : J. S. Haycraft
- Herbert Hayman (1893–1901) : H. B. Hayman
- Desmond Haynes (1989–1994) : D. L. Haynes
- David Hayward (1939) : D. R. Hayward
- Nantie Hayward (2004–2005) : M. Hayward
- John Head (1892–1898) : J. R. Head
- Cecil Headlam (1902–1906) : C. Headlam
- Dean Headley (1991–1992) : D. W. Headley
- George Hearne Senior (1864–1868) : G. Hearne
- J. T. Hearne (1888–1923) : J. T. Hearne
- J. W. Hearne (1909–1936) : J. W. Hearne
- Thomas John Hearne (1908) : T. J. Hearne
- Tom Hearne (1864–1875) : T. Hearne
- Arthur Howard Heath (1878) : A. H. Heath
- George Hebden (1908–1919) : G. L. Hebden
- Tom Helm (2013–2024) : T. G. Helm
- Robert Henderson (1872–1878) : R. Henderson
- Denis Hendren (1905–1919) : D. Hendren
- Patsy Hendren (1907–1937) : E. H. Hendren
- Perceval Henery (1879–1894) : P. J. T. Henery
- Francis Henley (1908) : F. A. H. Henley
- Frank Henry (1882) : F. Henry (Note: A fast bowler who was on the MCC ground staff at Lord's, Henry took two wickets in his only first-class match, an 1882 fixture against Surrey. Other than his name no biographical details are known.)
- Allen Herbert (1875) : A. H. W. Herbert
- Henry Herbert (1883) : H. M. B. Herbert
- Bob Herkes (1978–1979) : R. Herkes
- Bob Herman (1965–1971) : R. S. Herman
- Norman Hever (1947) : N. G. Hever
- Jamie Hewitt (1996–2001) : J. P. Hewitt
- Anthony Hickley (1930) : A. N. Hickley
- John Hickson (1894–1896) : J. A. E. Hickson
- Ryan Higgins (2017–2025) : R. F. Higgins
- Bill Higginson (1960) : T. W. Higginson
- Richard Hill (1921–1931) : R. H. Hill
- George Hillyard (1886) : G. W. Hillyard
- Charles Hoare (1875) : C. T. Hoare
- Max Holden (2017–2025) : M. D. E. Holden
- William Holdship (1894) : W. E. J. Holdship
- Luke Hollman (2021–2024) : L. B. K. Hollman
- Ron Hooker (1956–1969) : R. W. Hooker
- Jeffris Hopkins (1969–1972) : J. D. Hopkins
- William Horncastle (1883) : W. A. Horncastle
- John Hornsby (1893) : J. H. J. Hornsby
- William Horton (1927) : W. H. F. K. Horton
- Neil Hotchkin (1939–1948) : N. S. Hotchkin
- Dan Housego (2008–2010) : D. M. Housego
- Charles Howard (1931) : C. W. H. Howard
- Geoffrey Howard (1930) : C. G. Howard
- George Howitt (1865–1876) : G. Howitt
- Phillip Hughes (2009) : P. J. Hughes
- Simon Hughes (1980–1991) : S. P. Hughes
- Joe Hulme (1929–1939) : J. H. A. Hulme
- John Human (1935–1938) : J. H. Human
- John Hunt (1902–1912) : J. H. S. Hunt
- Robert Hunt (1926–1928) : R. N. Hunt
- Thos Hunt (2002–2003) : T. A. Hunt
- Bob Hurst (1954–1961) : R. J. Hurst
- Gilbert Hutchins (1890) : G. W. Hutchins
- Ian Hutchinson (1988–1991) : I. J. F. Hutchinson
- Paul Hutchison (2004–2005) : P. M. Hutchison
- Ben Hutton (1999–2007) : B. L. Hutton

== I ==
- Imran Tahir (2003) : Imran Tahir
- Eddie Ingram (1938–1949) : E. Ingram
- Anthony Ireland (2011–2012) : A. J. Ireland

== J ==
- Kevan James (1980–1984) : K. D. James
- Malcolm Jardine (1890–1892) : M. R. Jardine
- Richard Johnson (1992–2007) : R. L. Johnson
- Arthur Johnston (1886–1887) : A. S. Johnston
- Craig Jones (2005) : C. M. P. Jones
- Ian Jones (2002) : I. Jones
- Keith Jones (1967–1974) : K. V. Jones
- Ed Joyce (1999–2009) : E. C. Joyce
- Peter Judge (1933–1934) : P. F. Judge
- George Jupp (1867–1868) : G. H. Jupp

== K ==
- Jacques Kallis (1997) : J. H. Kallis
- Antony Kamm (1952) : A. Kamm
- Murali Kartik (2007–2009) : M. Kartik
- Henry Kaye (1900) : H. W. Kaye
- Matthew Keech (1991–1993) : M. Keech
- Chad Keegan (2001–2009) : C. B. Keegan
- Arthur Kemp (1890–1894) : A. L. Kemp
- Nick Kemp (1982) : N. J. Kemp
- Percival Kemp (1919) : P. H. Kemp
- Humphrey Kent (1920) : H. N. Kent
- Richard Kettleborough (1998–1999) : R. A. Kettleborough
- Aamer Khan (1995) : A. A. Khan
- Leslie Kidd (1910–1928) : E. L. Kidd
- Tom Killick (1926–1939) : Rev E. T. Killick
- Horace King (1936–1946) : H. D. King
- Roddy Kinkead-Weekes (1976) : R. C. Kinkead-Weekes
- Lance Klusener (2004) : L. Klusener
- John Knapp (1864) : J. W. Knapp
- Bill Knightley-Smith (1952) : W. Knightley-Smith
- Sven Koenig (2002–2004) : S. G. Koenig

== L ==
- Tom Lace (2019) : T. C. Lace
- Tim Lamb (1974–1977) : T. M. Lamb
- William Lambert (1874–1877) : W. Lambert
- Justin Langer (1998–2000) : J. L. Langer
- John Langley (1937) : J. D. A. Langley
- Aaron Laraman (1998–2002) : A. W. Laraman
- Harry Latchman (1965–1973) : A. H. Latchman
- George Law (1881) : G. Law
- Pat Lawrence (1964) : P. J. Lawrence
- Michael Laws (1948–1950) : M. L. Laws
- Mark Lawson (2008) : M. A. K. Lawson
- Frank Lee (1925) : F. S. Lee
- Frederick Lee (1867–1868) : F. Lee
- Harry Lee (1911–1934) : H. W. Lee
- Jack Lee (1923) : J. W. Lee
- Charles Leslie (1881–1886) : C. F. H. Leslie
- Edward Lester (1929–1930) : E. Lester
- Richard Lewis (1898) : R. P. Lewis
- John Lillywhite (1864) : J. Lillywhite
- Dan Lincoln (2019) : D. J. Lincoln
- David Ling (1966–1968) : D. J. Ling
- Arthur Litteljohn (1905–1914) : A. R. Litteljohn
- Edward Litteljohn (1900–1914) : E. S. Litteljohn
- Gerald Livock (1925–1927) : G. E. Livock
- Adam London (2009–2013) : A. B. London
- Henry Longman (1919–1920) : H. K. Longman
- Wilfrid Lord (1919) : W. F. Lord
- Johann Louw (2006) : J. Louw
- Geoffrey Love (1920) : G. R. S. Love
- George Lowles (1889) : G. W. Lowles
- A. P. Lucas (1883–1888) : A. P. Lucas
- Arthur Lucas (1876–1877) : A. C. Lucas
- Charles Lucas (1876–1877) : C. J. Lucas
- Robert Slade Lucas (1891–1900) : R. S. Lucas
- Alfred Lyttelton (1877–1887) : A. Lyttelton
- Edward Lyttelton (1878–1882) : E. Lyttelton

== M ==
- Gregor MacGregor (1892–1907) : G. MacGregor
- Neil MacLaurin (1988) : N. R. C. MacLaurin
- Christopher Magnay (1906–1911) : C. B. W. Magnay
- Dawid Malan (2006–2019) : D. J. Malan
- Pieter Malan (2022–2023) : P. J. Malan
- Henry Malcolm (1948) : H. J. J. Malcolm
- Maurice Manasseh (1964–1967) : M. Manasseh
- Frank Mann (1909–1931) : F. T. Mann
- George Mann (1937–1954) : F. G. Mann
- John Mann (1939–1947) : J. P. Mann
- Thomas Mantle (1864–1872) : T. A. Mantle
- Kervin Marc (1994–1995) : K. Marc
- Geoffrey Marks (1894–1895) : G. Marks
- Dennis Marriott (1972–1974) : D. A. Marriott
- Edward Marsden (1897) : E. L. Marsden
- Charles Marshall (1866) : C. Marshall
- Eric Martin (1919–1923) : E. Martin
- Marcus Martin (1870) : M. T. Martin
- Neil Martin (1997–1998) : N. D. Martin
- Rajesh Maru (1980–1982) : R. J. Maru
- John Massey (1927) : J. A. Massey
- Frederick Maude (1890–1896) : F. W. Maude
- John Maunders (1999–2001) : J. K. Maunders
- Cecil Maxwell (1946) : C. R. N. Maxwell
- Norman McCaskie (1931–1932) : N. McCaskie
- Alastair McCorquodale (1951) : A. McCorquodale
- John McCulloch (1914) : J. W. H. McCulloch
- John McEwen (1884) : J. W. McEwen
- Glenn McGrath (2004) : G. D. McGrath
- Michael Melluish (1957) : M. E. L. Melluish
- Henry Menzies (1891–1893) : H. Menzies
- Bill Merry (1979–1983) : W. G. Merry
- Colin Metson (1981–1986) : C. P. Metson
- Edward Mignon (1905–1913) : E. Mignon
- Andrew Miller (1983–1987) : A. J. T. Miller
- Henry Mills (1881) : H. M. Mills
- Harold Milton (1907) : H. A. Milton
- Daryl Mitchell (2021) : D. J. Mitchell
- Douglas Moffat (1864) : D. Moffat
- Norman Moffat (1921–1925) : N. J. D. Moffat
- Scott Moffat (1996–1997) : S. P. Moffat
- Mohammad Ali (2005–2006) : Mohammad Ali
- Mohammad Hafeez (2019) : Mohammad Hafeez
- Dermott Monteith (1981–1982) : J. D. Monteith
- Billy Moon (1891) : W. R. Moon
- Leonard Moon (1899–1909) : L. J. Moon
- Eustace Mordaunt (1891–1894) : E. C. Mordaunt
- Henry Mordaunt (1889–1893) : H. J. Mordaunt
- Richard More (1901–1910) : R. E. More
- Eoin Morgan (2005–2019) : E. J. G. Morgan
- James Morley (1865–1868) : J. H. Morley
- Geoff Morton (1950) : G. D. Morton
- Alan Moss (1950–1968) : A. E. Moss
- Roger Moulding (1977) : R. P. Moulding
- Mujeeb Zadran (2019) : Mujeeb Zadran
- George Mumford (1867–1872) : G. Mumford
- Len Muncer (1933–1946) : B. L. Muncer
- Ray Munt (1923) : H. R. Munt
- John Murray (1952–1975) : J. T. Murray
- Mike Murray (1952–1953) : M. P. Murray
- Joe Murrell (1906–1926) : H. R. Murrell
- Tim Murtagh (2007–2023) : T. J. Murtagh

== N ==
- Dirk Nannes (2008) : D. P. Nannes
- Guy Napier (1904–1913) : G. G. Napier
- David Nash (1995–2009) : D. C. Nash
- Dion Nash (1995–1996) : D. J. Nash
- Andrew Needham (1987–1988) : A. Needham
- Robert Nelson (1932–1933) : R. P. Nelson
- Augustus Nepean (1876–1877) : A. A. S. Nepean
- Charles Nepean (1873–1874) : C. E. B. Nepean
- Evan Nepean (1887–1895) : E. A. Nepean
- William Nevell (1936–1938) : W. T. Nevell
- John Nevinson (1933) : J. H. Nevinson
- Douglas Newman (1948–1951) : D. L. Newman
- George Newman (1929–1936) : G. C. Newman
- Scott Newman (2010–2011) : S. A. Newman
- Stephen Newton (1885) : S. C. Newton
- Kenneth Nicholl (1904) : K. I. Nicholl
- Richard Nicholls (1896–1904) : R. W. Nicholls
- William Nicholson (1864–1865) : W. Nicholson
- George Nixon (1868–1870) : G. T. S. Nixon
- Ashley Noffke (2002–2003) : A. A. Noffke
- Joe North (1923–1927) : E. J. North
- Percy Northcote (1888) : P. Northcote
- John Nunn (1926) : J. A. Nunn

== O ==
- Iain O'Brien (2010) : I. E. O'Brien
- Tim O'Brien (1881–1898) : T. C. O'Brien
- Valentine O'Connor (1908–1909) : V. R. O'Connor
- Martin Olley (1988) : M. W. C. Olley
- George Osborn (1881) : G. N. Osborn
- David Osborne (1911) : D. R. Osborne
- Cuthbert Ottaway (1874–1876) : C. J. Ottaway
- David Ottley (1967) : D. G. Ottley
- Tuppy Owen-Smith (1935–1937) : H. G. O. Owen-Smith
- John Oxley (1883) : J. H. Oxley

== P ==
- Charles Page (1905–1909) : C. C. Page
- George Paine (1926) : G. A. E. Paine
- Clayton Palmer (1904–1912) : C. Palmer
- Peter Parfitt (1956–1972) : P. H. Parfitt
- Tom Parsons (2011) : T. W. Parsons
- Ashok Patel (1977–1978) : A. S. Patel
- Ravi Patel (2010–2018) : R. H. Patel
- Dane Paterson (2025) : D. Paterson
- Irfan Pathan (2005) : I. K. Pathan
- Bernard Pauncefote (1868–1872) : B. Pauncefote
- M. E. Pavri (1895) : M. E. Pavri
- Sydney Pawling (1894) : S. S. Pawling
- Cecil Payne (1905–1909) : C. A. L. Payne
- Christopher Payne (1968–1970) : C. J. Payne
- Meyrick Payne (1904–1909) : M. W. Payne
- Harold Pearce (1905–1907) : H. E. Pearce
- Hugh Pearman (1969–1972) : H. Pearman
- Roger Pearman (1962–1964) : R. Pearman
- Thomas Pearson (1878–1885) : T. S. Pearson
- Charles Peat (1914) : C. U. Peat
- Ian Peebles (1928–1948) : I. A. R. Peebles
- Chris Peploe (2003–2008) : C. T. Peploe
- George Perkins (1883–1884) : G. Perkins (Note: Perkins, who was also known as William Carter, played in a single first-class match in 1884. A right-handed batsman who recorded a pair in the match, he was born at Ealing in 1864 and died at Isleworth in 1933.)
- Vernon Philander (2008) : V. D. Philander
- Hylton Philipson (1895–1898) : H. Philipson
- Jim Phillips (1890–1898) : J. Phillips
- Charles Pilkington (1903) : C. C. Pilkington
- Hubert Pilkington (1903–1904) : H. C. Pilkington
- George Pitts (1914) : G. J. S. Pitts
- John Pocknee (1884) : J. Pocknee (Note: A wicket-keeper, Pocknee played a single first-class match in 1884. He was born at Brighton in 1860 and died at Paddington in 1938.)
- Harry Podmore (2016) : H. W. Podmore
- Vivian Polley (1913) : V. R. Polley
- Jason Pooley (1989–1998) : J. C. Pooley
- Ted Pooley (1864–1865) : E. W. Pooley
- Stephen Poulter (1978) : S. J. Poulter
- Alfred Powell (1927) : A. P. Powell
- James Powell (1926–1930) : J. A. Powell
- Andrew Poynter (2005) : A. D. Poynter
- Stuart Poynter (2010) : S. W. Poynter
- Leslie Prentice (1920–1923) : L. R. V. Prentice
- Charles Prest (1870) : C. H. Prest
- Fred Price (1926–1947) : W. F. F. Price
- John Price (1961–1975) : J. S. E. Price
- Frank Putner (1933–1934) : F. W. Putner

== R ==
- Toby Radford (1994–1995) : T. A. Radford
- Clive Radley (1964–1987) : C. T. Radley
- Mark Ramprakash (1987–2000) : M. R. Ramprakash
- Geoffrey Raphael (1928) : G. L. Raphael
- Umer Rashid (1995–1998) : U. B. A. Rashid
- Thomas Ratliff (1869–1874) : T. Ratliff
- John Rawlin (1889–1909) : J. T. Rawlin
- Ollie Rayner (2011–2019) : O. P. Rayner
- Tom Reddick (1931) : T. B. Reddick
- Alan Richardson (2005–2009) : A. Richardson
- Henry Richardson (1868–1869) : H. A. Richardson
- Arthur Ridley (1882–1885) : A. W. Ridley
- Benjamin Roberson (1865–1866) : B. Roberson
- James Roberts (1892) : J. H. Roberts
- Jack Robertson (1937–1959) : J. D. B. Robertson
- James Robertson (1878–1891) : J. Robertson
- William Robertson (1900–1919) : W. P. Robertson
- Charles Robins (1953–1960) : R. V. C. Robins
- Walter Robins (1925–1954) : R. W. V. Robins
- Charles Robson (1881–1883) : C. Robson
- Clayton Robson (1926) : C. G. W. Robson
- Sam Robson (2008–2025) : S. D. Robson
- Mickey Roche (1899–1900) : W. Roche
- Chris Rogers (2011–2014) : C. J. L. Rogers
- John Rogers (1891) : J. P. Rogers
- Toby Roland-Jones (2010–2025) : T. S. Roland-Jones
- David Rome (1930–1933) : D. A. M. Rome
- Graham Rose (1983–1986) : G. D. Rose
- Mike Roseberry (1985–2001) : M. A. Roseberry
- Charles Ross (1875) : C. H. A. Ross
- Hamilton Ross (1876) : H. Ross
- Nigel Ross (1973–1977) : N. P. D. Ross
- Adam Rossington (2010–2014) : A. M. Rossington
- Reg Routledge (1946–1954) : R. Routledge
- Charles Rowley (1872) : C. R. Rowley
- Denis Russell (1928–1932) : D. L. Russell
- Eric Russell (1956–1972) : W. E. Russell
- Sid Russell (1960–1964) : S. E. J. Russell
- Edward Rutter (1868–1876) : E. Rutter

== S ==
- Edward Salmon (1878–1879) : E. H. P. Salmon
- Gurjit Sandhu (2011–2014) : G. S. Sandhu
- Jack Saunders (1891) : J. Saunders
- Clifford Saville (1914) : C. A. Saville
- Stanley Saville (1910–1928) : S. H. Saville
- Reggie Schwarz (1901–1905) : R. O. Schwarz
- Ben Scott (2004–2010) : B. J. M. Scott
- George Scott (2018–2019) : G. F. B. Scott
- Lord George Scott (1888) : G. W. Scott
- Stanley Scott (1878–1893) : S. W. Scott
- William Scott (1894–1895) : W. J. Scott
- Mike Selvey (1972–1982) : M. W. W. Selvey
- Tim Selwood (1966–1973) : T. Selwood
- John Sewell (1864–1867) : J. J. Sewell
- Thomas Shackle (1868) : T. Shackle
- Rowland Shaddick (1946–1947) : R. A. Shaddick
- Owais Shah (1996–2010) : O. A. Shah
- Shaheen Shah Afridi (2022) : Shaheen Shah Afridi
- Harry Sharp (1946–1955) : H. P. H. Sharp
- Cloudesley Sharpe (1923) : C. B. Sharpe
- Edward Domett Shaw (1882) : E. D. Shaw
- John Shenton (1888) : J. C. Shenton
- John Shepperd (1959–1960) : J. Shepperd
- Noel Sherwell (1925–1926) : N. B. Sherwell
- Kevin Shine (1994–1995) : K. J. Shine
- Chris Silverwood (2006–2009) : C. E. W. Silverwood
- John Simpson (2009–2023) : J. A. Simpson
- Jim Sims (1929–1952) : J. M. Sims
- Robin Sims (1992–1993) : R. J. Sims
- Challen Skeet (1920–1922) : C. H. L. Skeet
- Wilf Slack (1977–1988) : W. N. Slack
- Arthur Smith (1874–1877) : A. F. Smith
- Charles Smith (1868–1876) : C. J. Smith
- Ed Smith (2005–2008) : E. T. Smith
- Jim Smith (1934–1939) : C. I. J. Smith
- Lewis Smith (1934–1937) : L. A. Smith
- Michael J. Smith (1959–1980) : M. J. Smith
- Tom Smith (2010–2013) : T. M. J. Smith
- Albert Snow (1875–1876) : A. H. P. Snow
- William Soppitt (1887) : W. J. B. Soppitt
- Nathan Sowter (2017–2021) : N. A. Sowter
- George Spillman (1886) : G. Spillman
- Allan Ivo Steel (1912) : A. I. Steel
- Frederick Steele (1877–1879) : F. Steele
- Greville Stevens (1919–1932) : G. T. S. Stevens
- Alexander Stewart (1880) : A. L. Stewart
- James Stewart (1880) : J. M. Stewart
- Wes Stewart (1966–1968) : R. W. Stewart
- Haycroft Stirling (1932–1933) : H. Stirling
- Paul Stirling (2010–2019) : P. R. Stirling
- Andrew Stoddart (1885–1900) : A. E. Stoddart
- John Stogdon (1899–1907) : J. H. Stogdon
- Mark Stoneman (2021–2024) : M. D. Stoneman
- George Strachan (1870–1871) : G. Strachan
- Alfred Stratford (1877–1880) : A. H. Stratford
- Andrew Strauss (1998–2010) : A. J. Strauss
- Charles Studd (1879–1884) : C. T. Studd
- George Studd (1879–1886) : G. B. Studd
- Herbert Studd (1890) : H. W. Studd
- Kynaston Studd (1878–1884) : J. E. K. Studd
- Mike Sturt (1961–1978) : M. O. C. Sturt
- Scott Styris (2005–2006) : S. B. Styris
- Desmond Surfleet (1931–1933) : D. F. Surfleet
- Fred Susskind (1909–1910) : M. J. Susskind
- Edmund Sutton (1868) : E. G. G. Sutton
- John Swann (1949–1951) : J. L. Swann
- E. W. Swanton (1937–1938) : E. W. Swanton
- Edward Sweetland (1927) : E. H. Sweetland
- Jamie Sykes (1983–1989) : J. F. Sykes
- Steve Sylvester (1991–1992) : S. A. Sylvester

== T ==
- Alfred Tabor (1872) : A. Tabor
- Arthur Tabor (1872–1874) : A. S. Tabor
- Arthur Tanner (1920–1927) : A. R. Tanner
- Frank Tarrant (1904–1914) : F. A. Tarrant
- Charles Taylor (1990–1995) : C. W. Taylor
- Chilton Taylor (1981) : C. R. V. Taylor
- Herbert Taylor (1933) : H. Taylor
- Neil Taylor (1990) : N. R. Taylor
- Ross Taylor (2019) : L. R. P. L. Taylor
- Stanley Taylor (1901) : S. S. Taylor
- Charles Teape (1872) : C. A. Teape
- Charles Tebbut (1866–1870) : C. M. Tebbut
- Frederic Thesiger (1888–1892) : F. J. N. Thesiger
- Llewellyn Thomas (1893) : L. E. Thomas
- Alec Thompson (1939–1955) : A. W. Thompson
- Leslie Thompson (1946–1949) : L. B. Thompson
- M. Thompson (1866) : M. Thompson (Note: An amateur batsman, Thompson played twice for Middlesex in 1866 scoring a total of nine runs. Other than a surname and initial no biographical details are known.)
- Jeff Thomson (1981) : J. R. Thomson
- Charles Thornton (1875–1885) : C. I. Thornton
- George Thornton (1893–1899) : G. Thornton
- Percy Thornton (1872) : P. M. Thornton
- Martin Thursfield (1990) : M. J. Thursfield
- Henry Tilly (1954–1961) : H. W. Tilly
- Mark Tindall (1933–1938) : M. Tindall
- Fred Titmus (1949–1982) : F. J. Titmus
- Keith Tomlins (1978–1985) : K. P. Tomlins
- Kabir Toor (2010) : K. S. Toor
- Barry Trapnell (1946) : B. M. W. Trapnell
- Peter Trego (2005) : P. D. Trego
- Thomas Trelor (1872) : T. E. Trelor
- Edward Tritton (1864–1867) : E. W. Tritton
- Albert Trott (1898–1910) : A. E. Trott
- Phil Tufnell (1986–2002) : P. C. R. Tufnell
- Charles Tuke (1882) : C. M. Tuke
- Montague Turner (1872–1878) : M. Turner
- Nigel Turner (1937) : N. F. Turner
- Richard Twining (1910–1928) : R. H. Twining

== U ==
- Geoffrey Udal (1932) : G. F. U. Udal
- Shaun Udal (2008–2010) : S. D. Udal

== V ==
- Chaminda Vaas (2007) : W. P. U. J. C. Vaas
- Vintcent van der Bijl (1980–1981) : V. A. P. van der Bijl
- George Vassila (1880) : G. C. Vassila
- George Vernon (1878–1895) : G. F. Vernon
- Martin Vernon (1974–1976) : M. J. Vernon
- Adam Voges (2013–2017) : A. C. Voges
- Bert Vogler (1906) : A. E. E. Vogler

== W ==
- Anthony Waite (1962–1964) : A. C. Waite
- Isaac Walker (1864–1884) : I. D. Walker
- James Walker (1886–1890) : J. G. Walker
- John Walker (1879) : J. Walker
- John Walker (1864–1866) : J. Walker
- Russell Walker (1864–1877) : R. D. Walker
- V. E. Walker (1864–1877) : V. E. Walker
- Thilan Walallawita (2020–2022) : T. N. Walallawita
- Chris Walton (1957–1959) : A. C. Walton
- Plum Warner (1894–1920) : P. F. Warner
- John Warr (1949–1960) : J. J. Warr
- William Richard Watkins (1930–1937) : W. R. Watkins
- Arthur Watson (1890–1894) : A. K. Watson
- Ian Watson (1969) : I. R. Watson
- Charles Webb (1902) : C. J. B. Webb
- Sidney Webb (1897–1898) : S. Webb
- A. J. Webbe (1875–1900) : A. J. Webbe
- Herbert Webbe (1875–1879) : H. R. Webbe
- William Webster (1930–1947) : W. H. Webster
- Paul Weekes (1990–2006) : P. N. Weekes
- Peter Wellings (1996–1997) : P. E. Wellings
- Cyril Wells (1895–1909) : C. M. Wells
- George Wells (1864) : G. Wells
- Lionel Wells (1898–1905) : L. S. Wells
- Fred Welman (1880–1888) : F. T. Welman
- Herbert Wenyon (1921–1924) : H. J. Wenyon
- John West (1885–1896) : J. E. West (Note: West played in 86 first-class matches between 1885 and 1896 and stood in one Test match in 1905. Born at Stepney in 1861, he is known to have played cricket from 1880. He was employed as a professional by MCC and made his debut in first-class cricket in 1885, playing for Middlesex against Surrey. Of his 86 first-class matches, 76 were for Middlesex. Considered "a useful medium-paced bowler" who "could hit hard and fielded well" and occasionally played as a wicket-keeper, he scored a total of 1,523 runs, over 1,092 of them for Middlesex, and took 86 first-class wickets. He was member of the ground staff at Lord's for more than 20 years and continued to play in MCC matches until 1898. He umpired more than 250 first-class matches, including the fourth Test match between England and the touring Australians in 1905. West was given benefit seasons by Middlesex in 1903 and 1909, the first player to be awarded a second benefit season by the club. He died in 1920 at Bow in London aged 58.)
- John Westhorp (1893–1894) : J. W. Westhorp
- Henry Weston (1910–1914) : H. Weston
- Robin Weston (2000–2003) : R. M. S. Weston
- Jack Wheatley (1925–1928) : J. B. Wheatley
- Henry Wheeler (1864) : H. J. W. Wheeler
- Walter Wheeler (1873) : W. C. Wheeler
- Chris Whelan (2005–2007) : C. D. Whelan
- Philip Arthur Whitcombe (1948) : P. A. Whitcombe
- Bob White (1958–1965) : R. A. White
- Luke White (1946–1947) : L. R. White
- Robbie White (2018–2023) : R. G. White
- Roger White (1964–1966) : R. F. White
- Sidney White (1921–1923) : S. G. White
- Jonathan Whittington (1992) : J. M. S. Whittington
- William Wignall (1934–1936) : W. H. Wignall
- Anthony Wilkinson (1864–1874) : A. J. A. Wilkinson
- William Wilkinson (1881–1882) : W. O. C. Wilkinson
- Billy Williams (1885–1902) : W. Williams
- Herbert Williams (1890) : H. S. Williams
- Neil Williams (1982–1994) : N. F. Williams
- Robbie Williams (2007–2012) : R. E. M. Williams
- Andy Wilson (1932–1933) : A. E. Wilson
- Thomas Wilson (1880) : T. Wilson
- Arthur Winter (1866–1867) : A. H. Winter
- Gerald Winter (1900) : G. E. Winter
- † William Winter (1873) : W. Winter
- Frederick Winterburn (1883) : F. Winterburn
- John Wormald (1910–1922) : J. Wormald
- Chris Wright (2004–2007) : C. J. C. Wright
- Harold Wyatt (1905–1909) : H. D. Wyatt
- Hugh Wyld (1900–1901) : H. J. Wyld

== Y ==
- Jayant Yadav (2023) : J. Yadav
- Umesh Yadav (2022) : U. T. Yadav
- Jack Young (1933–1956) : J. A. Young

== Z ==
- Zafar Gohar (2025) : Zafar Gohar
