= Carris (surname) =

Carris is a surname. Notable people with the surname include:

- Bertram Carris (1917–2000), English cricketer
- Emily Carris-Duncan, American politician
- Harold Carris (1909–1959), English cricketer
- William Carris (born 1944), American politician

== See also ==
- Caris (name)
- Carri
- Carris Museum, museum in Lisbon
