= Cecil Winter =

English cricketer, educator and Royal Air Force officer

Personal information
- Full name: Cecil Esdaile Winter
- Born: 1 September 1879; Deal, Kent, England
- Died: 20 July 1964 (aged 84); Hove, Sussex, England
- Batting: Right-handed
- Role: Wicket-keeper
- Relatives: William Winter (father); Gerald Winter (brother); Arthur Winter (uncle)

Domestic team information
- Years: Team
- 1901–1902: Cambridge University

Career statistics
Competition	First-class
Matches	10
Runs scored	53
Batting average	6.62
100s/50s	–/–
Top score	18
Catches/stumpings	7/11
- Source: Cricinfo, 14 January 2022

Cecil Esdaile Winter (1 September 1879 — 20 July 1964) was an English first-class cricketer, educator and Royal Air Force officer.

The son of the cricketer William Winter, he was born at Deal in September 1879. He was educated at Uppingham School, where he played for the school cricket team, before going up to Trinity College, Cambridge. While studying at Cambridge, he played first-class cricket for Cambridge University Cricket Club in 1901 and 1902. Playing in the Cambridge side as a wicket-keeper, in this capacity Winter took seven catches and made eleven stumpings. As a batsman, he scored 53 runs at an average of 6.62, with a highest score of 18.

After graduating from Cambridge, Winter began a career in education and prior the First World War he taught at a number of schools in the South East England. He served in the First World War and was commissioned in the closing stages of the war as a temporary second lieutenant in the nascent Royal Air Force. He returned to education following the war and was subsequently appointed headmaster at Northaw Place School. Winter died at Hove in July 1964. His brother, Gerald, was also a first-class cricketer, as was his uncle Arthur Winter.
