= Winterburn (surname) =

Winterburn is an English surname. People with the surname include:

- Ben Winterburn (born 2004), English football player
- Emily Winterburn, British writer, physicist and historian of science
- Florence Hull Winterburn (1858–1945), American author, editor
- Frederick Winterburn (1857–1926), English cricketer
- Holly Winterburn (born 2000), British basketball player
- Joe Winterburn, English rugby league player
- Nigel Winterburn (born 1963), English footballer
- Peter Winterburn (died 2019), Canadian academic
- Walter of Winterburn (died 1305), English Dominican, cardinal, orator, poet, philosopher, and theologian
