= Crosdale =

Crosdale is a surname. Notable people with the surname include:

- Brett Crosdale (born 1973), English cricketer
- Gordon Crosdale (1880–1954), English cricketer

== See also ==
- Crossdale, Queensland, town
