= Teape =

Teape is a surname. Notable people with the surname include:

- Arthur Teape (1843–1885), English cricketer and barrister
- Charles Teape (1844–1925), English cricketer
- Charles Richard Teape (1830–1905), Scottish Episcopalian priest and historian
- Hugh Teape (born 1963), English high hurdler
