= Pearman =

Pearman is a surname. Notable people with the surname include:

- Alvin Pearman (born 1982), American football running back
- George Pearman, MP
- Graeme Pearman (born 1941), Chief of CSIRO Atmospheric Research in Australia from 1992 to 2002
- Hugh Pearman (architecture critic), the architecture critic of The Sunday Times and editor of The RIBA Journal
- Hugh Pearman (cricketer) (born 1945), English cricketer
- Joseph Pearman (1892–1961), American athlete who competed mainly in the 10 kilometre walk
- Lucy Pearman, British comedian and actress
- Roger Pearman (born 1939), English rugby union and rugby league footballer who played in the 1960s, and coached rugby league in the 1960s
- Roger Pearman (cricketer) (1943–2009), English cricketer and cricket administrator
- Tom Pearman (born 1979), English cricketer
- Raven-Symoné Christina Pearman (born 1985), American actress and singer

== See also ==
- Conyers Dill & Pearman, offshore law firm
- Silas N. Pearman Bridge, cantilever bridge that crossed the Cooper River in Charleston, South Carolina, USA
