= Frank Clifford =

Frank Clifford may refer to:

- Frank Clifford (cricketer)
- Frank Clifford (producer)
