= Frederick Hawkins =

Frederick or Fred Hawkins may refer to:

- Frederick Hawkins (politician) (died 1956), Irish politician
- Frederick Hawkins (cricketer) (1888–1975), English cricketer
- Erick Hawkins (Frederick Hawkins, 1909–1994), born American choreographer
- Fred Hawkins (golfer) (1923–2014), American golfer
- Fred Hawkins (politician) (born 1967), American politician in Florida
- Fred Hawkins (gymnast), British gymnast
