= Roger White =

Roger White may refer to:

- Roger White (politician) (1928–2000), British Tory MP
- Roger J. White (1942–2012), American Episcopal bishop of Milwaukee
- Roger White (executive) (fl. 2002–present), Scottish soft drinks CEO
- Roger White (cricketer) (born 1943), English cricketer
- Roger White (luger) (born 1965), Australian Olympic luger
- Roger Bourke White (1911–2002), Cleveland businessman

== See also ==
- Roger White-Parsons (born 1960), New Zealand rower
