= Geoffrey Hebden =

English cricketer

Personal information
- Full name: Geoffrey George Lockwood Hebden
- Born: 14 July 1918; Chiswick, Middlesex, England
- Died: 27 March 2000 (aged 81); Rowledge, Hampshire, England
- Batting: Right-handed
- Bowling: Right-arm fast-medium
- Relatives: George Hebden (father)

Domestic team information
- Years: Team
- 1937–1951: Hampshire
- 1952–1960: Dorset

Career statistics
Competition	First-class
Matches	6
Runs scored	69
Batting average	8.62
100s/50s	–/–
Top score	22*
Balls bowled	324
Wickets	3
Bowling average	57.33
5 wickets in innings	–
10 wickets in match	–
Best bowling	1/11
Catches/stumpings	1/–
- Source: Cricinfo, 1 February 2010

Geoffrey George Lockwood Hebden (14 July 1918 — 27 March 2000) was an English first-class cricketer.

The son of cricketer George Hebden, he was born at Chiswick in July 1918. Hebden made his debut in first-class cricket for Hampshire against Northamptonshire in a County Championship match played during the Bournemouth Cricket Week of 1937; he made a second appearance during the festival against Yorkshire. Hebden served in the British Army during the Second World War, being commissioned as a second lieutenant into the Dorset Regiment in February 1940. Following the war, he returned to play first-class for Hampshire, appearing twice in 1948 during the Bournemouth Cricket Week against Yorkshire and Surrey. Hebden made two further first-class appearances for Hampshire, both coming during the Bournemouth Cricket Week's of 1950 and 1951, against Northamptonshire and Cambridge University respectively. All of his six appearances in first-class cricket thus came at Dean Park Cricket Ground. Selected by Hampshire as an all-rounder, he scored 69 runs with a highest score of 22 not out. As a right-arm fast-medium bowler, he took 3 wickets at an average of 57.33.

Hebden's first-class career came to an end following the 1951 season, but he moved onto playing minor counties cricket for Dorset. He played minor counties cricket from 1952 to 1960, making fifty appearances in the Minor Counties Championship. He scored 2,245 runs for Dorset in the Minor Counties Championship, making three centuries and a highest score of 140. Two of his four centuries came in the same match against Cornwall in 1952, with Hebden making scores of 140 and 100 not out. Beginning in 1956, he began playing club cricket for Farnham Cricket Club. in 1961, he became the first Farnham player to score 1,000 runs for three consecutive seasons. He later became captain and president of the club. Hebden died in March 2000 at Rowledge, Hampshire.
