= John McEwen (disambiguation) =

John McEwen was the 18th Prime Minister of Australia.

John McEwen may also refer to:

- John McEwen (athlete) (born 1974), American hammer thrower
- John McEwen (Canadian politician)
- John A. McEwen (1824–1858), mayor of Nashville, Tennessee
- John Blackwood McEwen (1868–1948), Scottish classical composer
- John L. McEwen (1928–2010), American politician
- Sir John McEwen, 1st Baronet (1894–1962), Scottish politician
- John McEwen (cricketer) (1862–1902), English cricketer
