= Thomas Hampton =

Thomas Hampton may refer to:

- Tom Hampton (born 1965), American musician
- Thomas Hampton (cricketer) (born 1990), English cricketer
- T. J. Hampton, 19th-century American serial killer hanged in 1901
- Thomas de Hampton, MP for Hampshire (UK Parliament constituency)
