= George Hebden =

George Hebden may refer to:

- George Hebden (footballer) (1900–1973)
- George Hebden (cricketer) (1879–1946)
