= Bill Higginson =

Bill Higginson may refer to:

- William J. Higginson (1938–2008), American poet, translator and author
- Bill Higginson (cricketer) (born 1936), English cricketer
