= George Osborn =

George Osborn may refer to:

- George Osborn (minister)
- George Osborn (cricketer)
- George Osborn (mathematician)
- George C. Osborn (1904–1982), American historian
- Sir George Osborn, 4th Baronet, British general and MP

== See also ==
- George Osborne (disambiguation)
