= Hugh Pearman =

Hugh Pearman may refer to:

- Hugh Pearman (cricketer) (born 1945), English cricketer
- Hugh Pearman (architecture critic) (born 1955), British architecture critic and editor
