= Haycroft =

Haycroft may refer to:

== Places ==
- Haycroft, Cheshire
- Haycroft, Ontario

== People ==
=== As a surname ===
- Gloria Haycroft, 1960 Australian national netball captain
- Sarah Haycroft, English field hockey player

=== As a given name ===
- Haycroft Stirling, English cricketer
