= Thomas Fox =

Thomas Fox may refer to:

== Politicians ==
- Thomas Fox (1622–1666), English MP for Tamworth 1660–1661
- Thomas Fox (elected 1406), MP for Nottingham
- Tom Fox (Australian politician) (1876–1951), Australian politician and football player
- Tom Fox (British politician) (1860–1934), English trade unionist and politician
- Thomas Fox (Leicester MP), represented Leicester (UK Parliament constituency)

== Sportspeople ==
- Thomas Fox (dermatologist) (1849–1916), English cricketer and dermatologist
- Thomas Fox (Middlesex cricketer) (1878–1931), English cricketer
- Tony Fox (rower) (Thomas Anthony Fox, 1928–2010), Guernsey-born doctor and rower
- Tom Fox (executive), former chief executive of Aston Villa F.C.
- Tom Fox (rugby league), rugby league footballer of the 1930s
- Tom Fox (hurler), Irish hurler

== Others ==
- Thomas Fox (priest), English priest
- Tom Fox (baritone), American opera singer
- Tom Fox (Quaker) (1951–2006), American Quaker killed in Iraq while serving with Christian Peacemaker Teams
- Tom Fox, founder and president of New York Water Taxi
- Thomas C. Fox, journalist and publisher for the National Catholic Reporter
- Thomas Martin Fox (1893–1967), Australian bishop of the Catholic Church

== See also ==
- Tom Foxe (1937–2000), Irish politician
- Tinker Fox (1610–1650), Colonel John Fox, English Parliamentarian soldier, erroneously referred to as Thomas Fox by some sources
- Thomas Fox Averill (born 1949), American writer
