= Henry Weston =

Henry Weston may refer to:

- Henry Weston (politician) (1534–1592), MP for Petersfield and Surrey
- Henry Weston (cricketer) (1888–unknown), English cricketer active 1909–14
- Henry Weston (rugby union), English international rugby union player
- Henry Weston (newspaper proprietor) (1838–1920), owner of the Taranaki Herald
