= Soppitt =

Soppitt is a surname. Notable people with the surname include:

- Henry Thomas Soppitt (1858–1899), English scientist
- William Soppitt (1856–1910), English cricketer
