= Lucas Bacmeister =

Lucas Bacmeister may refer to:

- Lucas Bacmeister (cricketer) (1869–1962), English cricketer
- Lucas Bacmeister (theologian) (1530–1608), Lutheran theologian and composer
