= Llewellyn Thomas (disambiguation) =

Llewellyn Thomas (1903–1992) was a British physicist and applied mathematician.

Llewellyn Thomas may also refer to:

- Llewellyn Thomas (English cricketer) (1865–1924), English cricketer
- Llewellyn Thomas (Australian cricketer) (1883–1962), Australian cricketer
- Thomas Llewellyn Thomas (1840–1897), Welsh scholar generally known as Llewellyn Thomas
