= Arthur Kemp (disambiguation) =

Arthur Kemp is a British writer.

Arthur Kemp may also refer to:

- Arthur Kemp (Middlesex cricketer) (1868–1929), English first-class cricketer
- Arthur Kemp (Kent cricketer) (1863–1940), English first-class cricketer
- Arthur Kemp (footballer), Australian rules footballer
