= Edward Lester =

Edward Lester may refer to:

- Ted Lester (1923–2015), English cricketer for Yorkshire
- Edward Lester (Middlesex cricketer), English cricketer active 1929–31
