= Statue of Elizabeth II, Andover =

Statue in Hampshire, England

Coordinates: 51.207600°N 1.481562°W

A statue of Queen Elizabeth II was unveiled in Riverside Park, Andover, Hampshire, in September 2024. It was sculpted by Amy Goodman. Goodman said that it was " ... such an honour and privilege to sculpt our late Queen. I wanted to capture her warmth and humility; she did have such a radiant smile".

It is sculpted in bronze and depicts Queen Elizabeth II smiling and waving. She is wearing robes and a crown. The robes feature pictures inspired by members of local residents of Andover. It was commissioned by Test Valley Borough Council to mark the Queen's Platinum Jubilee in 2022. It was unveiled on 30 September 2024 by the Lord Lieutenant of Hampshire, Nigel Atkinson. A second statue of the Queen, depicting her at the time of her coronation, is to be erected in Romsey by Test Valley Borough Council in 2025.
