= Burghes =

Burghes is a surname. Notable people with the surname include:

- Arthur Burghes (1848–1916), English cricketer
- Charlotte Burghes (1894–1969), later known as Charlotte Haldane, British author

== See also ==
- Burges
- Burgess (surname)
