= Puddington =

Puddington may refer to:

- Puddington, Cheshire
- Puddington, Devon
