= Geoffrey Wood =

English cricketer

Personal information
- Full name: Geoffrey Dayrell Wood
- Born: 17 August 1891; Hampstead, Middlesex, England
- Died: 13 October 1915 (aged 24); Auchy-lez-La-Bassée, Pas-de-Calais, France
- Batting: Unknown
- Bowling: Slow left-arm orthodox

Domestic team information
- Years: Team
- 1910–1911: Suffolk
- 1912: Oxford University

Career statistics
Competition	First-class
Matches	1
Runs scored	0
Batting average	0.00
100s/50s	–/–
Top score	0
Balls bowled	72
Wickets	2
Bowling average	18.00
5 wickets in innings	–
10 wickets in match	–
Best bowling	1/16
Catches/stumpings	–/–
- Source: Cricinfo, 12 July 2019

Geoffrey Dayrell Wood (17 August 1891 – 13 October 1915) was an English first-class cricketer.

Wood was the second of six boys born to Ernest Richard Wood and his wife, Katherine Grace Wood. He was educated at Cheltenham College, before going up to Exeter College, Oxford. While studying at Oxford, he made a single appearance in first-class cricket for Oxford University against the Marylebone Cricket Club (MCC) at Oxford in 1912. Batting once in the match, he was dismissed in the Oxford first-innings without scoring by Humphrey Gilbert. He took the wickets of Clare Baker in the MCC first-innings and Gus Kelly in the MCC second-innings, finishing with match figures of 2 for 36. In addition to playing first-class cricket, Wood also played minor counties cricket for Suffolk in 1910 and 1911, making three appearances in the Minor Counties Championship.

Wood served in the First World War, enlisting with the Suffolk Regiment as a second lieutenant in August 1914. He was promoted to the temporary rank of lieutenant in April 1915. He was killed in action on 13 October 1915 at the Hohenzollern Redoubt during the Battle of Loos, while serving with the 7th (Service) Battalion of his regiment, a Kitchener's Army unit which formed part of the 12th (Eastern) Division.

He was buried where he fell, with his body not being recovered after the battle. He is commemorated at the Loos Memorial.
