= Jeff Atkinson =

Jeff or Geoff Atkinson may refer to:

- Canadian politician, see New Democratic Party candidates, 2003 Ontario provincial election
- Jeff Atkinson (runner) (born 1963), American middle-distance runner
- Geoff Atkinson, British comedy writer
- Geoffrey Atkinson (1896–1951), English cricketer
