= Arthur Francis =

Arthur Francis may refer to:

- Arthur Francis, a pseudonym used by Ira Gershwin (1896–1983), American lyricist
- Arthur Francis (rugby) (1882–1957), New Zealand dual-code rugby player
- Arthur Francis (Glamorgan cricketer) (born 1953), former Welsh cricketer
- Arthur Francis (Middlesex cricketer) (1854–1908), English cricketer
- Arthur Francis (footballer) (1886–1952), Australian rules footballer
- Arthur Francis (politician) (1828–1902), member of the Queensland Legislative Assembly
