= Thomas Cuming =

Thomas Cuming may refer to:

- Thomas B. Cuming (1827–1858), American military officer and politician
- Thomas Cuming (cricketer) (1893–1960), English cricketer
- Thomas Cuming Hall (1858–1936), American Presbyterian theologian

== See also ==
- Thomas Cumming (disambiguation)
- Thomas Cummings
