= John Bastow =

English cricketer

Personal information
- Born: 30 October 1850; Bromley-by-Bow, London
- Died: 1 June 1927 (aged 76); Haverstock Hill, London
- Source: Cricinfo, 16 March 2017

John Bastow (30 October 1850 – 1 June 1927) was an English cricketer. He played five first-class matches for Middlesex between 1874 and 1877.

== See also ==
- List of Middlesex County Cricket Club players
