= Wilfred Bird =

English cricketer (1883–1915)

Personal information
- Full name: Wilfred Stanley Bird
- Born: 28 September 1883; Yiewsley, Middlesex, England
- Died: 9 May 1915 (aged 31); Aubers Ridge, Richebourg, France
- Source: Cricinfo, 16 March 2017

Wilfred Stanley Bird (28 September 1883 – 9 May 1915) was an English cricketer. He played 55 first-class matches for Middlesex and Oxford University between 1904 and 1913. He was killed in action during World War I. According to Sydney Rhodes James, he was a "first-rate" wicketkeeper.

Bird was a teacher at Ludgrove School for a number of years before being gazetted as a Lieutenant with the King's Royal Rifles in January, 1915.

== See also ==
- List of Middlesex County Cricket Club players
- List of cricketers who were killed during military service
