= Bernard Atkinson =

English cricketer

Personal information
- Full name: Bernard Gerard Wensley Atkinson
- Born: 11 September 1900; Puddington, Devon, England
- Died: 4 September 1966 (aged 65); Hampstead, London, England
- Batting: Right-handed
- Bowling: Right-arm fast-medium
- Relatives: Nigel Atkinson (brother)

Domestic team information
- Years: Team
- 1933–1934: Middlesex
- 1922–1925: Northamptonshire

Career statistics
Competition	First-class
Matches	22
Runs scored	554
Batting average	15.82
100s/50s	–/2
Top score	94
Balls bowled	1,808
Wickets	25
Bowling average	34.68
5 wickets in innings	–
10 wickets in match	–
Best bowling	4/97
Catches/stumpings	17/–
- Source: Cricinfo, 30 December 2012

Bernard Gerard Wensley Atkinson (11 September 1900 – 4 September 1966) was an English first-class cricketer. Atkinson was a right-handed batsman who bowled right-arm fast-medium. He was born at Puddington, Devon.

Educated at St Paul's School, London, Atkinson played for the school cricket team from 1916 to 1919, heading the batting averages in his last two years there. He later attended the University of Cambridge, but did not represent the university in first-class cricket. He would make his debut in first-class cricket for Northamptonshire against Kent in the 1922 County Championship. He made ten first-class appearances for the county in that season, scoring 257 runs at an average of 17.13, with a high score of 91, his only half century score of the season. As an all-rounder, he also took 5 wickets with the ball, which came at an average of 31.80, with best figures of 2/13. Outside of cricket, he was an educator, which may account for his making no appearances for Northamptonshire in first-class cricket in 1923 and 1924. He did however make three first-class appearances for the county in the 1925 County Championship, scoring 29 runs at an average of 5.80, while with the ball he took 2 wickets.

A gap of several years followed before his next appearance in first-class cricket, this time for Middlesex for whom he made his debut against Lancashire in the 1933 County Championship. He played for the county in the 1933 and 1934 seasons, making a total of nine appearances, scoring 286 runs at an average of 14.30, with a high score of 91. With the ball, he took 18 wickets at an average of 36.00, with best figures of 4/97. He left the county at the end of the 1934 season to undertake a teaching position at the Edinburgh Academy, while teaching there he played club cricket for Grange Cricket Club, also making several minor appearances for Scotland.

He died at a hospital in Hampstead, London on 4 September 1966. His brother, Nigel Atkinson, also played first-class cricket.
