= Aaron Jeavons =

English cricketer

Personal information
- Full name: Aaron Francis Jeavons
- Born: 23 April 1989 (age 37); Stafford, Staffordshire, England
- Nickname: Jeavo
- Batting: Left-handed
- Bowling: Right-arm off break

Domestic team information
- Years: Team
- 2010–present: Staffordshire
- 2010: Oxford MCCU

Career statistics
Competition	First-class
Matches	1
Runs scored	66
Batting average	33.00
100s/50s	–/1
Top score	62
Balls bowled	–
Wickets	–
Bowling average	–
5 wickets in innings	–
10 wickets in match	–
Best bowling	–
Catches/stumpings	1/–
- Source: Cricinfo, 23 September 2011

Aaron Francis Jeavons (born 23 April 1989) is an English cricketer. Jeavons is a left-handed batsman who bowls right-arm off break. He was born in Stafford, Staffordshire and educated at Walton High School in Stafford.

While studying for his degree at Oxford Brookes University, Jeavons made a single first-class appearance for Oxford MCCU against Middlesex in 2010. In this match, he scored 62 runs in the Oxford MCCU first-innings, before being dismissed by Ravi Patel. In their second-innings, he was dismissed for 4 runs by Thomas Hampton. During the 2010 season, Jeavons also made his debut for Staffordshire in the Minor Counties Championship against Suffolk. To date he has made ten Minor Counties Championship appearances and a single MCCA Knockout Trophy appearance, which was made against Northumberland in 2011.
