= James Bates (cricketer) =

English cricketer

Personal information
- Born: 10 January 1856; Paddington, London
- Died: 7 December 1915 (aged 59); London
- Source: Cricinfo, 16 March 2017

James Bates (10 January 1856 – 7 December 1915) was an English cricketer. He played one first-class match for Middlesex in 1880.

== See also ==
- List of Middlesex County Cricket Club players
