= Oliver Marks =

English cricketer and colonial administrator

Personal information
- Full name: Oliver Marks
- Born: 10 September 1866; Thornton Heath, Surrey, England
- Died: 24 May 1940 (aged 73); Brompton, London, England
- Batting: Unknown
- Bowling: Unknown
- Relatives: Geoffrey Marks (brother)

Domestic team information
- Years: Team
- 1901: Marylebone Cricket Club

Career statistics
Competition	First-class
Matches	1
Runs scored	1
Batting average	1.00
100s/50s	–/–
Top score	1
Balls bowled	54
Wickets	0
Bowling average	–
5 wickets in innings	–
10 wickets in match	–
Best bowling	–
Catches/stumpings	–/–
- Source: Cricinfo, 14 October 2021

Oliver Marks CMG (10 September 1866 – 24 May 1940) was an English first-class cricketer and colonial administrator.

== Life ==
The son of John George Marks, and nephew of Henry Stacy Marks and Frederick Walker, he was born in September 1866 in Surrey, in Thornton Heath or Beddington. He was educated at Whitgift School.

After leaving Whitgift School, Marks went to British Ceylon, where he was a tea planter from 1887 to 1891. From there he went to British Malaya, where he was the superintendent of a Malayan government plantation in Perak. He joined the administrative service in 1894, holding several posts before briefly being appointed British Resident at Negeri Sembilan. He was an assistant magistrate until 1896, after which he was an Assistant Secretary to the government in Perak, a post he held until 1898. From 1898 to 1903, he was Assistant Secretary to the Resident General in the Federated Malay States, after which he served as both the Secretary to High Commissioners for Malaya and Private Secretary to the governor of the Straits Settlements. By 1914, he was Acting Resident of Perak, with his duties including laying the foundation stone of St. George's Institution, Taiping. By the 1920s, Marks was the British Resident in Selangor. He was made a Companion of the Order of St Michael and St George for his colonial service in the 1922 New Year Honours.

In later life Marks was secretary of the British Malaya Association, He died in England, at Brompton in May 1940. His brother, Geoffrey, was also a first-class cricketer.

== Cricketer ==
A keen cricketer, Marks played minor matches for Ceylon in 1890 and 1891. On a visit to England in 1901, Marks made a single appearance in first-class cricket for the Marylebone Cricket Club (MCC) against London County at Crystal Palace. Batting once in the MCC's only innings, he was dismissed for a single run by W. G. Grace. In London County's only innings, he bowled nine wicketless overs.

== Family ==
Marks married in 1905 Violet Catherine Murray, daughter of Colonel Alexander Murray (1850–1910), the Colonial Engineer and Surveyor of Malaya. They had a son, Geoffrey Noel Marks.
