= Thomas Cummings =

Thomas Cummings may refer to:

- Tommy Vext (Thomas Cummings, born 1982), American heavy metal singer and songwriter
- Thomas L. Cummings Sr. (1891–1968), mayor of Nashville, Tennessee
- Thomas Seir Cummings (1804–1894), American miniature painter and author

== See also ==
- Thomas Cuming
- Thomas Cumming (disambiguation)
