= George Osborne (disambiguation) =

George Osborne (born 1971) was Chancellor of the Exchequer under the Cameron governments.

George Osborne may also refer to:

== Dukes ==
- George Osborne, 6th Duke of Leeds (1775–1838), British Master of the Horse, Lord Lieutenant of the North Riding of Yorkshire
- George Osborne, 8th Duke of Leeds (1802–1872), eldest son of the 1st Baron Godolphin, nephew of 6th Duke
- George Osborne, 9th Duke of Leeds (1828–1895), British peer
- George Osborne, 10th Duke of Leeds (1862–1927), his son, British MP for Brixton, Treasurer of the Household

== Others ==
- George Osborne, a fictional character in the novel Vanity Fair
- George Osborne (cricketer), English cricketer for Derbyshire County Cricket Club
- George Alexander Osborne (1806–1893), Irish composer
- Sir George Francis Osborne, 16th Baronet (1894–1960), Anglo-Irish baronet and British Army officer
- Sir George Osborne (1814 ship)

== See also ==
- George Osborn (disambiguation)
