= 1913–14 Yorkshire Cup =

- Structure: Regional knockout championship
- Teams: 13
- Winners: Huddersfield
- Runners-up: Bradford Northern

The 1913–14 Yorkshire Cup was the ninth occasion on which the Yorkshire Cup competition, a Rugby league tournament, was held. This season there were no junior/amateur clubs taking part, no new entrants and no "leavers" and so the total of entries remained the same at thirteen. This in turn resulted in three byes in the first round.

This year saw a previous two-time winner, Huddersfield taking the trophy by beating Bradford Northern by the score of 19–3 in the final. The match was played at Thrum Hall, Halifax, now in West Yorkshire. The attendance was 12,000 and receipts were £430. This was Huddersfield's fourth appearance in what would be seven appearances in eight consecutive finals between 1909 and 1919 (which included four successive victories and six in total), and who knows, but for the intervention of the First World War and suspension of the competition, it may have been more. It was also the first of the four consecutive wins.

== Background ==
The Rugby Football League's Yorkshire Cup competition was a knock-out competition between (mainly professional) rugby league clubs from the county of Yorkshire. The actual area was at times increased to encompass other teams from outside the county such as Newcastle, Mansfield, Coventry, and even London (in the form of Acton & Willesden. The Rugby League season always (until the onset of "Summer Rugby" in 1996) ran from around August-time through to around May-time and this competition always took place early in the season, in the Autumn, with the final taking place in (or just before) December (The only exception to this was when disruption of the fixture list was caused during, and immediately after, the two World Wars).

== Competition and results ==
=== Round 1 ===
Involved 5 matches (with three byes) and 13 clubs

Game No	Fixture date	Home team	Score	Away team	Venue	Ref
1	Sat 18 Oct 1913	Bradford Northern	4–2	Keighley	Birch Lane	
2	Sat 18 Oct 1913	Halifax	9–0	Batley	Thrum Hall	
3	Sat 18 Oct 1913	Huddersfield	67–0 (Note: Highest winning margin at the time (beating Bradford's 68–2 victory over Bramley in 1906)	Bramley	Fartown	
4	Sat 18 Oct 1913	Hunslet	8–19	Dewsbury	Parkside	
5	Sat 18 Oct 1913	Wakefield Trinity	8–0	Hull	Belle Vue	
6		Hull Kingston Rovers		bye		
7		Leeds		bye		
8		York		bye		

=== Round 2 – quarterfinals ===
Involved 4 matches and 8 clubs

Game No	Fixture date	Home team	Score	Away team	Venue	Ref
1	Sat 1 Nov 1913	Dewsbury	18–5	Hull Kingston Rovers	Crown Flatt	
2	Sat 1 Nov 1913	Halifax	0–39	Huddersfield	Thrum Hall	
3	Sat 1 Nov 1913	Leeds	7–15	Wakefield Trinity	Headingley	
4	Sat 1 Nov 1913	York	4–9	Bradford Northern	Clarence Street	

=== Round 3 – semifinals ===
Involved 2 matches and 4 clubs

Game No	Fixture date	Home team	Score	Away team	Venue	Ref
1	Sat 15 Nov 1913	Bradford Northern	13–2	Wakefield Trinity	Birch Lane	
2	Sat 15 Nov 1913	Huddersfield	37–0	Dewsbury	Fartown	

=== Final ===
Game No	Fixture date	Home team	Score	Away team	Venue	Att	Rec	Ref
	Saturday 29 November 1913	Huddersfield	19–3	Bradford Northern	Thrum Hall (Note: Thrum Hall was the home ground of Halifax with a final capacity of 9,832 (The attendance record of 29,153 was set on 21 March 1959 for a third round Challenge Cup tie v Wigan). The club finally moved out in 1998 to take part ownership and ground-share with Halifax Town A.F.C. at The Shay Stadium.)	12000	430	

==== Teams and scorers ====
Huddersfield	No.	Bradford Northern
	teams	
Major Holland	1	H. Schofield
Albert Rosenfeld	2	W. H. Irving
Tom Gleeson	3	N. Wilby
Robert Habron	4	G. Hall
George Todd	5	F. Wilson
Jim Davies	6	J. McEwan
Johnny Rogers	7	C. Carter
Fred Longstaff	8	Joe Winterburn
Ben Gronow	9	J. Haley
Jack Chilcott	10	W. H. Mitchell
Douglas Clark	11	J. Ruck
Aaron Lee	12	J. B. Simmonds
John Higson	13	Harry Feather(?)
??	Coach	??
19	score	3
8	HT	0
	Scorers	
	Tries	
George Todd (2)	T	N. Wilby (1)
Robert Habron (2)	T	
Albert "Rozzi" Rosenfeld (1)	T	
	Goals	
Major Holland (2)	G	
Referee		B. Ennion (Wigan)

Scoring – Try = three (3) points – Goal = two (2) points – Drop goal = two (2) points

=== The road to success ===
First round
Halifax	9
Batley	0
Huddersfield	67
Bramley	0
Hunslet	8
Dewsbury	19
Hull Kingston Rovers
bye
York
bye
Bradford Northern	4
Keighley	2
Leeds
bye
Wakefield Trinity	8
Hull	0

Second round
Halifax	0
Huddersfield	39
Dewsbury	18
Hull Kingston Rovers	5
York	4
Bradford Northern	9
Leeds	7
Wakefield Trinity	15

Semifinals
Huddersfield	37
Dewsbury	0
Bradford Northern	13
Wakefield Trinity	2

Final
Huddersfield	19
Bradford Northern	3

== See also ==
- 1913–14 Northern Rugby Football Union season
- Rugby league county cups
