= Henry Bates (cricketer) =

English cricketer

Personal information
- Born: 3 December 1880; Shoreditch, London, England
- Died: 9 September 1942 (aged 61); Reading, Berkshire
- Source: Cricinfo, 16 March 2017

Henry Bates (3 December 1880 – 9 September 1942) was an English cricketer. He played two first-class matches for Middlesex in 1909.

== See also ==
- List of Middlesex County Cricket Club players
