= Thomas Cumming (disambiguation) =

Thomas Cumming may refer to:

- Thomas Cumming (1714–1774) (the "Fighting Quaker"), American merchant known for the Capture of Senegal in 1758
- Thomas W. Cumming (1814–1855), Georgia politician

== See also ==
- Thomas Cuming
- Thomas Cummings
