= Charles Francis (cricketer) =

English cricketer

Charles King Francis (3 February 1851 – 28 October 1925) was an English first-class cricketer active 1870–79 who played for Middlesex. He was born in Upminster; died in Crichel, Dorset. His brother Arthur was also a cricketer.

Francis was educated at Rugby School and Brasenose College, Oxford. After graduating he became a barrister and practised in London and south-east England. He was a stipendiary magistrate (now called a district judge) from 1896.

One of his court clerks, F. T. Giles, recalled with affection that he was a "tall, handsome, stooping septuagenarian ... [with] abundant common sense which probably stood him in better stead on the Bench than marked legal learning", though acknowledging his "total inability to master and apply even the simplest of legal principles".
