= Henry Malcolm =

English cricketer

Henry John James Malcolm (4 July 1914 – 6 January 1995) was an English cricketer.

He represented Middlesex County Cricket Club in four first-class matches in 1948, scoring 139 runs at an average of 27.80, with a highest score of 76 not out on his debut against Cambridge University at Fenner's.

He was best remembered for his considerable all-round achievements in club cricket, primarily for South Hampstead. In club matches in 1951 he scored 2,531 runs at an average of 140.6 and took 123 wickets at an average of 13. He scored 105 for the Club Cricket Conference against the 1949 New Zealanders and later took up coaching.
