= William Catling =

English cricketer

William Catling (9 September 1836 – 10 June 1899) was an English first-class cricketer active 1864–65 who played for Middlesex. He was born in Highgate, Middlesex and died in Camden Town. He appeared in eight first-class matches.
