= John Nevinson =

English cricketer

John Harcourt Nevinson (2 November 1910 – 22 August 1987) was an English first-class cricketer who played for Middlesex and Oxford University between 1930 and 1935. He was born in Lausanne, Switzerland and died in Lambeth, London.
