= Alfred Tabor =

English cricketer (1850–1925)

Alfred Tabor (24 February 1850 – 16 December 1925) was an English first-class cricketer active 1868–90 who played for Middlesex. He was born in Trent, Middlesex; died in Eastbourne.

He was educated at Harrow School for whom he played cricket.
