= Benjamin Roberson =

English cricketer

Personal information
- Born: 12 September 1832; Ware, Hertfordshire
- Died: 6 April 1874 (aged 41); Upper Holloway, London
- Batting: Right-handed
- Role: Middle-order batsman

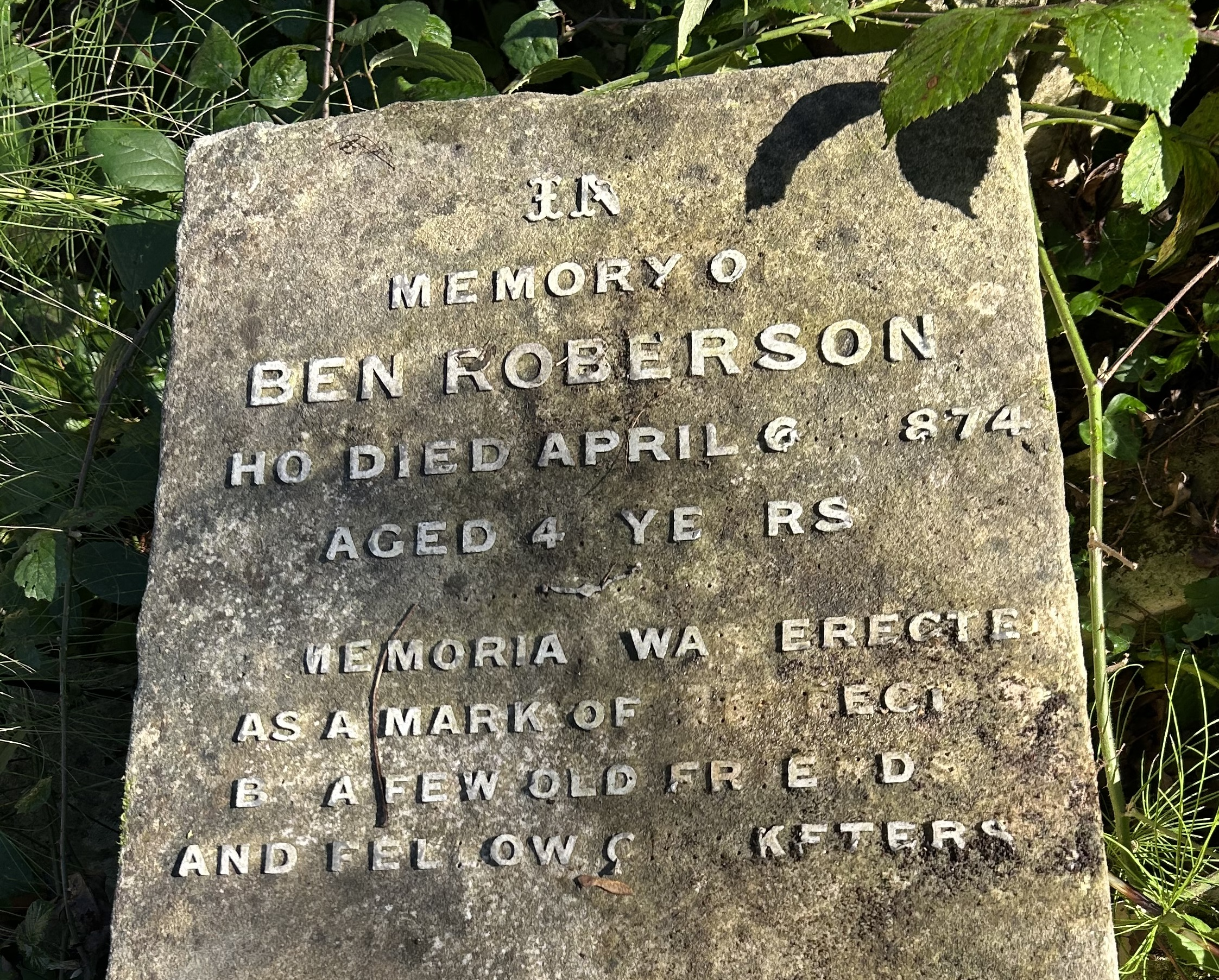
Grave of Benjamin Roberson in Highgate Cemetery

Benjamin Roberson (12 September 1832 – 6 April 1874) was an English first-class cricketer, active from 1865 to 1866, who played for Middlesex as a middle-order batsman, he played in two first-class matches. He also played for Hertfordshire.

He was born in Ware, Hertfordshire, died in Upper Holloway and was buried at Highgate Cemetery.
