= Ernie Clifton =

English cricketer (born 1939)

Ernest George ("Ernie") Clifton (born 15 June 1939 in Lambeth) is a former English first-class cricketer who played for Middlesex as a wicketkeeper from 1962 to 1966.

Clifton was Middlesex's deputy wicketkeeper to the Test player John Murray, and played most of his cricket for the first team when Murray was on Test duty. Later he was the South Australian Cricket Association coach from 1970 to 1979.
