= John Bevington =

British cricketer

John Currey Bevington (6 April 1872 – 4 April 1933) was an English first-class cricketer who played in a single match for Middlesex in 1900. He was born in Sydenham in London; he died in Chelmsford, Essex.

His brother Timothy Bevington also played for Middlesex and for amateur teams.
