= Walter Bunting =

English cricketer

Walter Henry Bunting (18 June 1854 – 28 October 1922) was an English first-class cricketer active 1877 who played for Middlesex. He was born in Cambridge; died in Burnham-on-Sea, Somerset.
