= Syd Brown =

English cricketer (1917–1987)

Personal information
- Full name: Sydney Maurice Brown
- Born: 8 December 1917; Eltham, Kent, England
- Died: 28 December 1987 (aged 70); Rickmansworth, Hertfordshire, England
- Batting: Right-handed

Domestic team information
- Years: Team
- 1937–1955: Middlesex

Career statistics
Competition	First-class
Matches	329
Runs scored	15,756
Batting average	29.17
100s/50s	22/80
Top score	232*
Balls bowled	135
Wickets	3
Bowling average	26.66
5 wickets in innings	0
10 wickets in match	0
Best bowling	2/19
Catches/stumpings	152/2
- Source: Cricinfo, 8 September 2026

Sydney Maurice Brown (8 December 1917 – 28 December 1987) was an English cricketer active from 1937 to 1955 who played for Middlesex in 329 first-class matches as an opening batsman.

Brown was a right-handed batsman and the regular opening partner of Jack Robertson at Middlesex. He was noted by Playfair magazine as a "brilliant outfield". He scored 15,756 runs at an average of 29.17 with a highest innings score of 232*, one of 22 centuries. He completed eighty half-centuries. His highest score was made against Somerset at Lord's in 1951. He held 152 catches and, as he was an occasional wicketkeeper, completed two stumpings.

== Career ==
CricInfo describes Brown as "stocky in build and somewhat flat-footed". He was "an attacking opening batsman" and "an outstanding fielder". On his 1937 debut for Middlesex, against Oxford University, he opened the innings with E. W. Swanton who was making the first of only three first-class appearances. Jack Robertson made his debut in the same game but batted in the middle order.

Brown showed great promise in 1937, playing mostly for the county's Second XI team. He became the regular first team opener in 1938 when he scored his maiden first-class century against Lancashire and was just short of 1,000 runs for the season, earning the award of his county cap. He struggled to find form in 1939 and then his career was interrupted by the Second World War. Brown joined the British Army and was posted to Aldershot Command where he was stationed from 1940 to 1944. He played in numerous wartime cricket matches, often for teams representing the Aldershot Command or District, many of them at Lord's. He did not play in 1945 due to military duties.

Brown made a good comeback to first-class cricket in 1946 with 1,300 championship runs and two centuries. He had his most successful season in 1947 when he scored 2,078 runs with four centuries, helping Middlesex to win the County Championship. Wisden said of his efforts in 1947 that he was "unorthodox in style but of great concentration". Brown was noted for his fine footwork and his best shots were the square cut, the hook and, in general, all strokes played off the back foot. He played many valuable innings that season in partnership with Robertson, including nine century opening stands, the best of which was a then county record 310 against Nottinghamshire. Echoing the opinion of Playfair, Wisden praised Brown's fielding and said "his work in the outfield was unsurpassed by anyone in the country".

Brown performed inconsistently in the remainder of his career after 1947 and never quite reached Test standard, but he occasionally produced an outstanding innings to delimit "periods of comparative failure". Whenever he scored a century, it tended to be a "large one" (i.e., 150-plus) that would have a significant impact on the outcome of the match. Wisden described his matchwinning 150* against Glamorgan in 1948 as "a masterly achievement and technically correct". In 1949, he scored his first double-century, exactly 200, against Kent at Canterbury. 1951 was his second-best season with nearly 1,700 runs and his highest score against Somerset.

In November 1954, the car he was driving skidded into a trolleybus at Wembley. His passenger, former Chelsea footballer and Middlesex teammate, Len Dolding, died of his injuries ten days later. Brown was hospitalised for a month with injuries to his chest and left eye .

In 1955, aged 37, he completed 1,000 runs for the ninth time, but his season's average was down to 22.57 and he decided, perhaps rightly in Wisden's view, to retire there and then. Brown had a successful benefit in 1953 and, after his retirement from cricket, became a publican.

== Sources ==
- Syd Brown at CricketArchive
- Syd Brown at ESPN CricInfo
- Playfair Cricket Annual, 9th edition, editor Peter West, Playfair Books, 1956
- Wisden Cricketers' Almanack, 85th edition, editor Hubert Preston, Sporting Handbooks Ltd, 1948
- Wisden Online – Obituaries in 1988 – Syd Brown
