= Thomas Trelor =

English cricketer

Thomas Trelor (29 October 1846 – unknown) was an English first-class cricketer active 1866–72 who played for Middlesex. He was born in St Austell.
