= Denis Russell =

English cricketer

Denis Leslie Russell MBE TD (2 July 1909 – 29 December 1986) was an English first-class cricketer active 1928–1932 who played for Middlesex and Oxford University. He was born in Paddington, Middlesex; died in Merrow, Surrey.

Russell was educated at Beaumont College, Berkshire, and University College, Oxford. During World War II he was an officer in GHQ Liaison Regiment. At the end of the war he was appointed MBE (along with many other servicemen) "in recognition of gallant and distinguished services in North-West Europe." He also received a formal mention in despatches after the war. He was awarded the Territorial Decoration in 1950.
