= Joseph Box =

English cricketer (1842–1873)

Joseph William Box (14 June 1842 – 2 October 1873) was an English first-class cricketer active 1866–68 who played for Middlesex. He was born in Peckham and died in Bow Common. He was a wicketkeeper and played in four first-class matches.
