= Geoffrey Marks (cricketer) =

English cricketer

Geoffrey Marks (15 November 1864 – 25 August 1938) was an English first-class cricketer active 1894–1900 who played for Middlesex. He was born in Thornton Heath, Surrey; died in Newnham, Hampshire. His brother Oliver was also a first-class cricketer.
