= Maurice Dauglish =

English cricketer

Maurice John Dauglish (2 October 1867 – 30 April 1922) was an English first-class cricketer active 1886–90 who played for Middlesex and Oxford University as a right-handed batsman and wicketkeeper. He was born in St Pancras, London; died in Hunton Bridge.
