= Edward Litteljohn =

English cricketer (1878–1955)

Edward Salterne Litteljohn (24 September 1878 – 22 January 1955) was an English first-class cricketer active 1900–14 who played for Middlesex. He was born in Hanwell; died in Beaconsfield.
