= Pat Lawrence =

English cricketer (born 1942)

Patrick Joseph Lawrence (born 2 October 1942, Roseau, Dominica) is an English former first-class cricketer who represented Middlesex as a right-arm fast-medium bowler in four first-class matches during the 1964 season.
