= Harold Pearce =

English cricketer

Harold Edgar Pearce (1 April 1884 – 19 May 1939) was an English first-class cricketer active in 1905–1907 who played for Middlesex. He was born in Barnet; and died by suicide in Chichester.
