= Vivian Polley =

English cricketer

Vivian Ralph Polley (22 December 1880 – 12 February 1967) was an English first-class cricketer active 1909–13 who played for Middlesex. He was born in Fulham; died in Brighton.
