= Herbert Bryant =

British cricketer

Herbert William Bryant (30 June 1867 – 23 February 1910) was an English first-class cricketer active 1888–89 who played for Middlesex as a wicketkeeper. He was born in Uxbridge; died in the Azores of sudden heart failure after suffering acute gastritis.
