= Clifford Saville =

English cricketer

Personal information
- Full name: Clifford Allen Saville
- Born: 5 February 1892; Tottenham, Middlesex, England
- Died: 8 November 1917 (aged 25); Fresnoy-le-Grand, Aisne, France
- Batting: Right-handed
- Relatives: Stanley Saville (brother)

Domestic team information
- Years: Team
- 1914: Middlesex

Career statistics
Competition	First-class
Matches	3
Runs scored	57
Batting average	11.40
100s/50s	0/0
Top score	32
Catches/stumpings	0/–
- Source: Cricinfo, 28 July 2022

Clifford Allen Saville (5 February 1892 – 8 November 1917) was an English first-class cricketer active in 1914 who played for Middlesex in three first-class matches. He served in the British Army during the First World War as an officer in the East Yorkshire Regiment, in the course of which he was killed in action in November 1917.

== Life and military service ==
Saville was born to Walter and Emma Saville at Tottenham in February 1892. He was educated at Marlborough College, from where he progressed to study medicine. Saville made three appearances in first-class cricket in the 1914 County Championship for Middlesex with limited success against Yorkshire, Lancashire, and Nottinghamshire; he played alongside his younger brother, Stanley, in these matches.

Saville served in the British Army during the First World War, being commissioned into the East Yorkshire Regiment as a second lieutenant in October 1914; he was one of the original officers of the 11th Battalion, colloquially known as part of the Hull Pals. In December 1915, he was made a temporary lieutenant, before being made an acting captain in June 1917. In the East Yorkshire Regiment, Saville was commanding officer of 6th Platoon and was later a bombing officer and officer commanding 'A' Company from May to November 1917. He saw action during the Battle of Arras in 1917, and later that year he was killed on 8 November while leading a daylight raid on German trenches. His body was never recovered, but he was commemorated at the Arras Memorial.
