= Stanley Saville =

English cricketer

Stanley Herbert Saville (21 November 1889 – 22 February 1966) was an English first-class cricketer active 1910–31 who played for Middlesex and Cambridge University. The elder brother of Clifford Saville, he was born in Tottenham; died in Eastbourne.
