= Gilbert Hutchins =

English cricketer

Gilbert William Hutchins (28 February 1858 – 25 November 1902) was an English first-class cricketer active 1890 who played for Middlesex. He was born in Knebworth; died in Bedford.
