= Thomas Wilson (Middlesex cricketer) =

English cricketer

Thomas Wilson (fl. 1880s) was an English cricketer who played for Middlesex in a single match in the 1880 cricket season. His birth and death details are not known.

Wilson was described in a contemporary reference as "a fast right-handed bowler with a low delivery". He played for the Middlesex "Colts" team in May and June 1880 and in a trial match on a June Saturday against the Orleans Club he took nine wickets, including those of influential amateurs C. I. Thornton and A. J. Webbe. That led to his instant selection for the full Middlesex side for a county match against Gloucestershire that started the following Monday, alongside Thornton and Webbe and facing the three Grace brothers.

In what proved to be his sole first-class appearance for the Middlesex side, Wilson's bowling was attacked by E. M. Grace in particular: The Field reported that "amongst his [Grace's] items made off Wilson were two drives, a cut and a leg-hit, for each of which four runs were obtained". Wilson failed to take a wicket in 20 four-ball overs, at a cost of 31 runs. Batting at No 11, he scored 5 runs in the only innings in which he batted, the runs coming from a single stroke off E. M. Grace, before he was caught at slip off Billy Midwinter, who took seven Middlesex wickets.

Wilson became the cricket professional and coach at Hitchin Cricket Club in Hertfordshire and between 1883 and 1889, he made eight appearances in non-first-class matches for Hertfordshire County Cricket Club against other county sides. In 1885, the annual match between Hertfordshire and the Marylebone Cricket Club was played at Hitchin for the benefit of Wilson, who was then described as "one of the county professional bowlers".
