= Valentine O'Connor =

Irish cricketer

Personal information
- Full name: Valentine Rickard O'Connor
- Batting: Right-handed
- Bowling: Right-arm slow

Domestic team information
- Years: Team
- 1908-1909: Middlesex

Career statistics
Competition	FC
Matches	3
Runs scored	40
Batting average	10.00
100s/50s	–/–
Top score	30
Balls bowled	90
Wickets	1
Bowling average	62.00
5 wickets in innings	–
10 wickets in match	–
Best bowling	1/62
Catches/stumpings	2/–
- Source: Cricinfo, 1 December 2010

Valentine Rickard O'Connor (1878 – 23 June 1956) was an Irish cricketer. O'Connor was a right-handed batsman who bowled right-arm slow. He was born Ireland, but where exactly and on what exact date is unknown.

O'Connor, who played as an amateur, made his first-class debut for Middlesex in 1908 against Somerset at the County Ground, Taunton. The following season he played 2 further first-class matches, both against Sussex.

In his 3 first-class matches, O'Connor scored 40 runs at a batting average of 10.00, with a high score of 30. With the ball he took a single wicket in his only bowling innings, taking figures of 1/62.

He died in Paddington, London on 23 June 1956.
