= Sid Beton =

English cricketer

Sydney Lionel Beton (22 November 1895 – 30 November 1972) was an English first-class cricketer active 1923–1928 who played for Middlesex. He was born in Paddington; died in St John's Wood.
