= William Benton (cricketer) =

English cricketer

William Manstead Benton (11 July 1873 – 17 August 1916) was an English first-class cricketer who played for Middlesex in two matches in 1913. He was born in Chelsea, London and died near Méricourt-l'Abbé, France, on active service during World War I.

A clergyman and soldier, he served throughout the Boer War. The year before his death on active service, he was wounded in France and sent home as an invalid in 1915. Before the First World War, he had been curate-in-charge of Bearsted in Kent, and his club cricket was for Mote Park Cricket Club in Maidstone.
