= Joe Winterburn =

English rugby league footballer

Personal information
- Full name: Joseph Winterburn
- Born: unknown
- Died: unknown

Playing information
- Position: Forward
Club
Years	Team	Pld	T	G	FG	P
	Keighley
1911–20	Bradford Northern
	Total	0	0	0	0	0
Representative
Years	Team	Pld	T	G	FG	P
1908	Yorkshire	2	1	0	0	3

Joseph Winterburn (birth unknown – death unknown) was an English professional rugby league footballer who played in the 1910s and 1920s. He played at representative level for Yorkshire, and at club level for Keighley and Bradford Northern (captain), as a forward.

== Playing career ==
=== Bradford Northern ===
Winterburn joined Bradford Northern from Keighley in 1911.

Winterburn played as a forward, and was captain, in Bradford Northern's 3–19 defeat by Huddersfield ("The Team of All Talents") in the 1913 Yorkshire Cup Final during the 1913–14 season at Thrum Hall, Halifax on Saturday 29 November 1913, in front of a crowd of 12,000.

=== County honours ===
Winterburn won caps for Yorkshire while at Bradford Northern.
