= Harold Milton =

English cricketer

Harold Aubrey Milton (15 January 1882 – 14 March 1970) was an English first-class cricketer active 1907 who played for Middlesex. He was born in Hackney; died in Islington.
