= Sholto Douglas (cricketer) =

English cricketer (1873–1916)

Sholto Douglas (8 September 1873 – 28 January 1916) was an English first-class cricketer active 1906 who played for Middlesex. He was born in Norwood Green, Middlesex; died in Cambrin, Arras, France, on active service during World War I.
