= Brett Crosdale =

Personal information
- Full name: Brett Lyle Crosdale
- Born: 30 May 1973 (age 53); Waratah, New South Wales, Australia
- Batting: Right-handed
- Bowling: Right-arm medium

Domestic team information
- Years: Team
- 2000: Wiltshire

Career statistics
Competition	LA
Matches	2
Runs scored	13
Batting average	6.50
100s/50s	–/–
Top score	13
Balls bowled	–
Wickets	–
Bowling average	–
5 wickets in innings	–
10 wickets in match	–
Best bowling	–
Catches/stumpings	–/–
- Source: Cricinfo, 10 October 2010

Brett Lyle Crosdale (born 30 May 1973) is a former Australian born English cricketer. Crosdale was a right-handed batsman who bowled right-arm medium pace. He was born at Waratah, New South Wales.

Crosdale played 5 matches for the Somerset Second XI in the Second XI Championship from 1995 to 1996. Crosdale later made his Minor Counties Championship debut for Wiltshire in 2000 against Oxfordshire. He represented the county in one further Minor Counties Championship match in 2000, which came against Herefordshire. Crosdale also represented Wiltshire in the MCCA Knockout Trophy during the 2000 season. His debut in that competition came against the Somerset Cricket Board. During the 2000 season, he represented the county in 4 Trophy matches, the last of which came against Cornwall.

Corsdale also represented Wiltshire in 2 List A matches. His 2 List A matches came against Scotland and the Middlesex Cricket Board, both of which came in the 2000 NatWest Trophy. In his 2 List A matches, he scored 13 runs at a batting average of 6.50, with a high score of 13.
