= Clare Baker =

English cricketer

Personal information
- Born: 23 November 1885; Marylebone, London
- Died: 7 December 1947 (aged 62); Betchworth, Surrey
- Source: Cricinfo, 16 March 2017

Clare Baker (23 November 1885 – 7 December 1947) was an English cricketer. He was notably included in the Harrow XI team in 1905 and later featured in 58 innings, with a notable personal best of 53 runs achieved against Yorkshire at Sheffield in 1910, for Middlesex between 1906 and 1912. Outside of cricket, Baker was a member of the prestigious London Stock Exchange.

== See also ==
- List of Middlesex County Cricket Club players
