= Charles Cater =

English cricketer

Charles Alexander Cater (24 January 1844 – 3 February 1892) was an English first-class cricketer active 1866–67 who played for Middlesex. He was born in Liverpool and died in Harrow. He played in three first-class matches as a right-handed batsman, scoring 22 runs with a highest score of 20.
