= Arthur Teape =

English cricketer, barrister

Personal information
- Full name: Arthur Stanley Teape
- Born: 28 January 1843; Blackheath, Kent, England
- Died: 1 March 1885 (aged 42); Hampstead, Middlesex, England
- Batting: Right-handed
- Bowling: Right-arm roundarm fast
- Relatives: Charles Teape (brother)

Domestic team information
- Years: Team
- 1863–1866: Oxford University

Career statistics
Competition	First-class
Matches	16
Runs scored	111
Batting average	10.09
100s/50s	–/–
Top score	19
Balls bowled	1,511
Wickets	54
Bowling average	11.26
5 wickets in innings	5
10 wickets in match	1
Best bowling	6/19
Catches/stumpings	8/–
- Source: Cricinfo, 4 April 2020

Arthur Stanley Teape (28 January 1843 – 1 March 1885) was an English first-class cricketer and barrister.

The son of Tobias Teape, he was born at Blackheath in January 1843. He was educated at Eton College, before going up to Exeter College, Oxford. While studying at Oxford, he played first-class cricket for Oxford University, making his debut against the Marylebone Cricket Club at Oxford in 1863. He played first-class cricket for Oxford until 1866, making sixteen appearances. Playing as a right-arm roundarm fast bowler, he took 54 wickets in his sixteen matches, at an average of 11.26. He took five wickets in an innings on five occasions and took ten wickets in a match once. His best innings figures of 6 for 19 came against Cambridge University in The University Match of 1863.

A student of Lincoln's Inn, he was called to the bar as a barrister in June 1870. Teape died at Hampstead in March 1885. His brother, Charles, also played first-class cricket.
