= Geoffrey Love =

English cricketer

Personal information
- Full name: Geoffrey Robert Stuart Love
- Born: 19 April 1889; Islington, London, England
- Died: 6 February 1978 (aged 88); Balquhidder, Perthshire, Scotland
- Batting: Left-handed

Domestic team information
- Years: Team
- 1920–1928: Middlesex County Cricket Club
- Source: CricInfo, 3 February 2023

Geoffrey Robert Stuart Love (19 April 1889 – 6 February 1978) was an English first-class cricketer who played for Middlesex County Cricket Club in the 1920s. He was born at Islington in 1889 and died at Balquhidder, Perthshire in 1978.
