= William Anderson (cricketer, born 1871) =

English cricketer

William Anderson (12 November 1871 – 31 January 1948) was an English first-class cricketer. He was a right-handed batsman and a right-arm medium-fast bowler who played for Middlesex. He was born in Westminster and died in Bury St. Edmunds.

Anderson made just one first-class appearance for the team, in the 1891 season, against Yorkshire. Anderson scored 0 and 2 runs in his two innings, being bowled out both times by five-time Test cricketer Ted Wainwright.

Anderson made appearances in miscellaneous matches in 1895 and 1896, mostly for Marylebone Cricket Club. Anderson's nephew was one time first-class player William Agnew.
