= Carris Museum =

Transport museum in Lisbon, Portugal

CARRIS Museum
- Museu da CARRIS
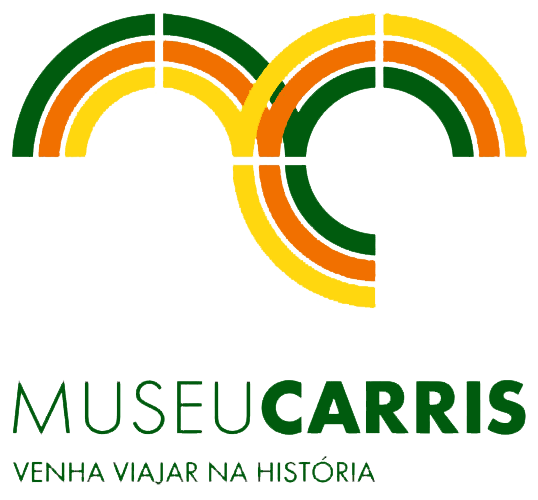

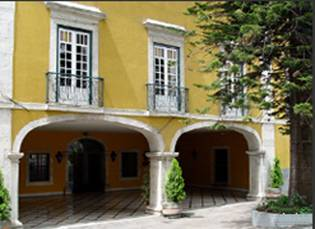
- The facade of the former Santo Amaro Station
- Established: 12 January 1999
- Location: Alcântara, Lisbon
- Coordinates: 38.7020°N 9.1806°W
- Director: Luís Vale
- Curator: Serviço Educativo do Museu da CARRIS
- Owner: CARRIS Companhia Carris de Ferro de Lisboa
- Website: museu.carris.pt

The CARRIS Museum (Portuguese: Museu da Carris) is a museum that is open to the public and showcases the history of public transport in Lisbon. It is situated in the civil parish of Alcântara, municipality of Lisbon.

== History ==
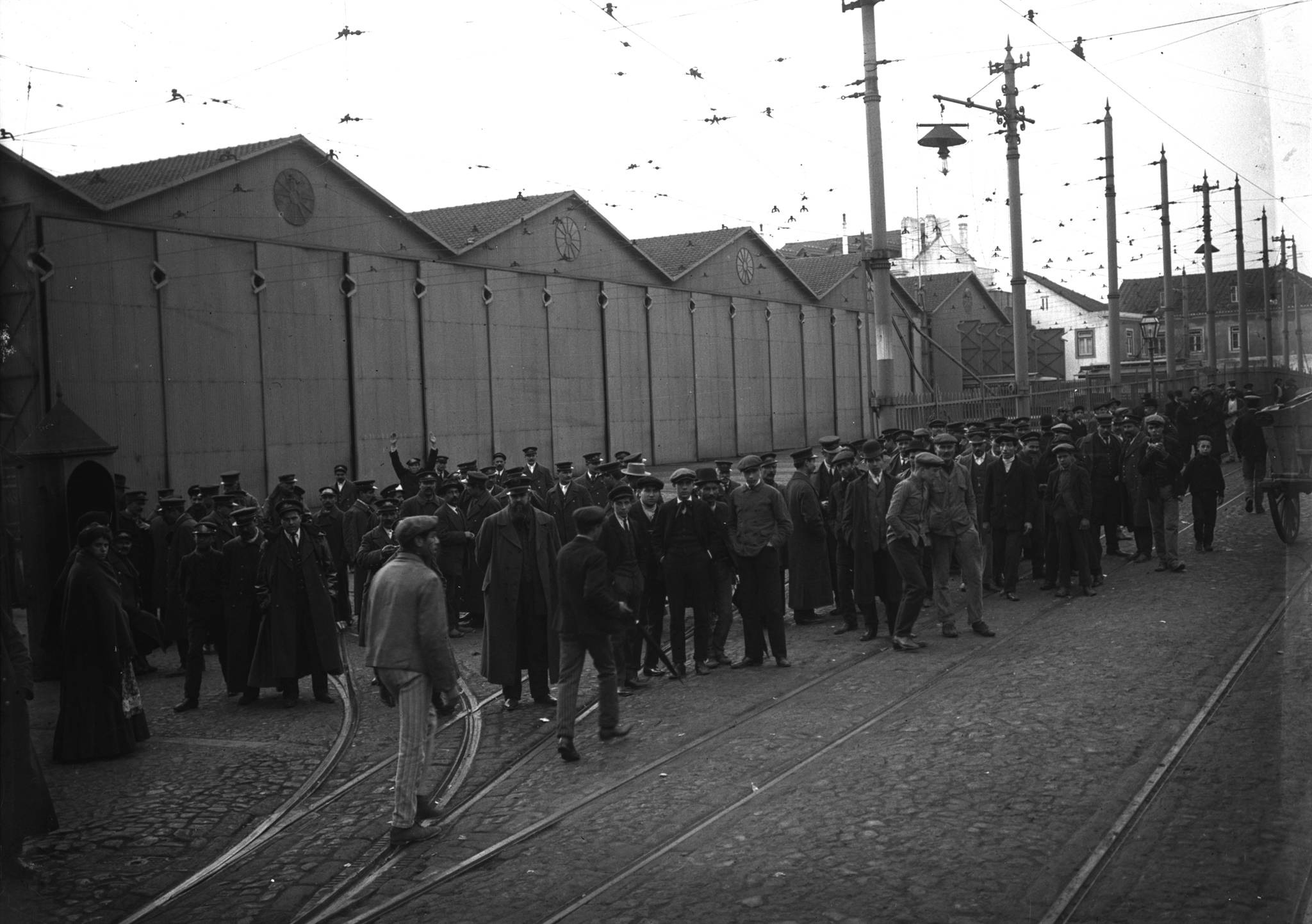
The CARRIS depot as seen in 1912

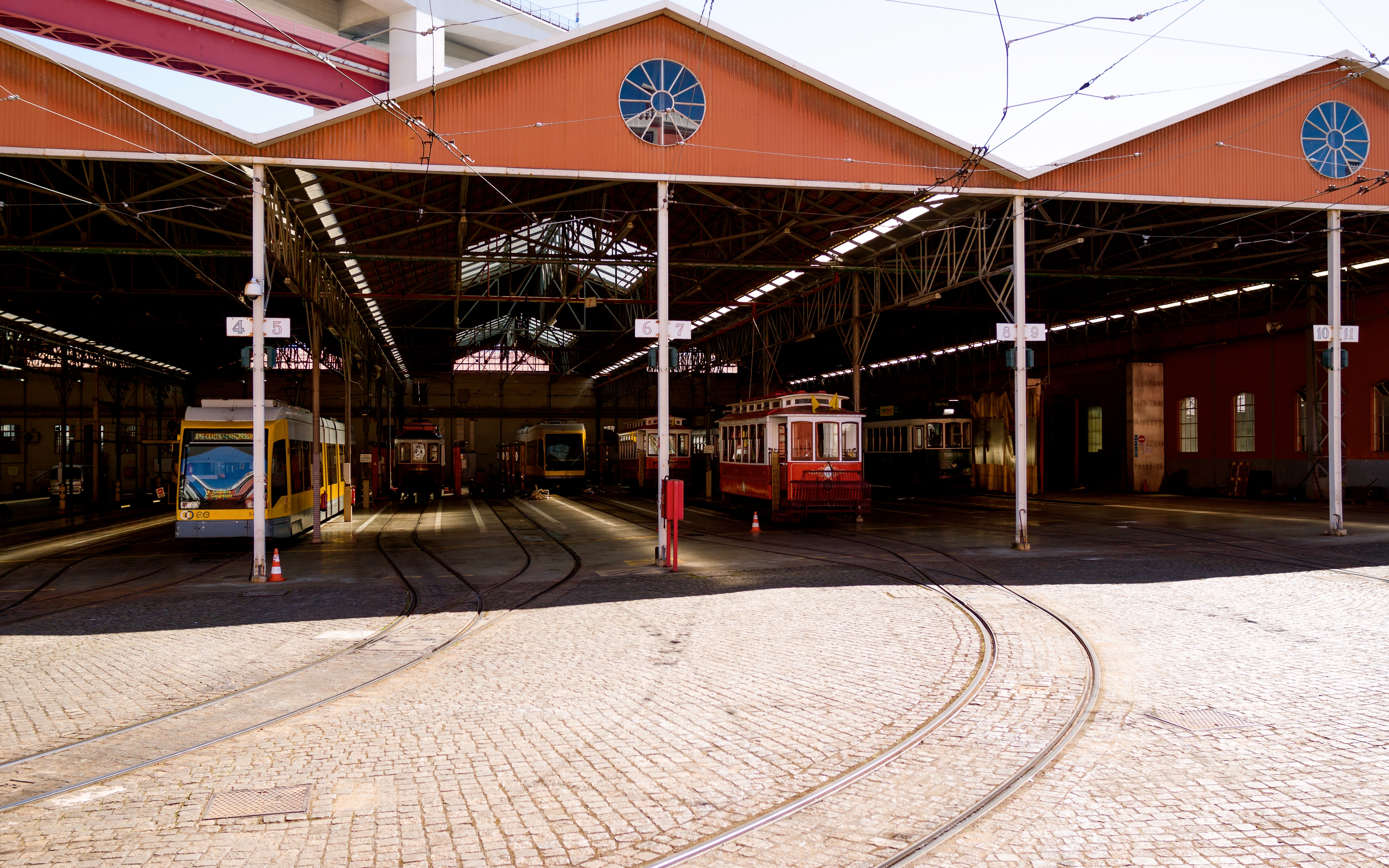
A view of the station depot housing modern and older trams

Originally the company headquarters, the company acquired the former Palácio dos Condes da Ponte (residence of the Counts of Ponte) in 1874.

The building is included within the Special Protection Zone group that includes the Chapel of Santo Amaro, Burnay Palace, Salão Pompeia and Casa Nobre de Lázaro Leitão Aranha and Palácio Sabugosa.

Inaugurated on 12 January 1999, it has been part of the Portuguese museum network since 2010.

== Architecture ==
The museum is situated on the north bank of the Tagus River of Alcântara in an area of Lisbon that contains various cultural attractions including the Museum of the Orient, Ajuda National Palace, the National Coach Museum, the museum of the Portuguese Presidency, Jeronimos Monastery and Belem Cultural Centre. It is in the Santo Amaro Depot which houses Lisbon's trams.

The museum is divided into three sections, two of which occupy disused workshops at the depot.

=== Collection ===
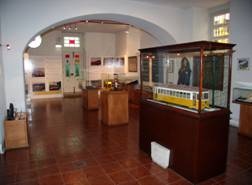
Exhibits and displays in the main museuological nucleus

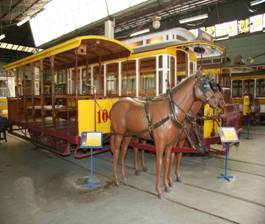
Examples of the horse-drawn trams used at the turn-of-the-century

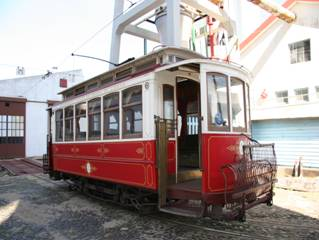
A 1901 tram in the museum collection

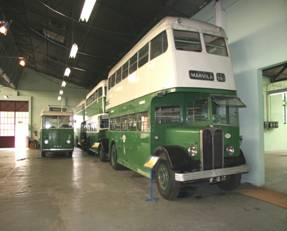
A 20th century double-decker bus used by CARRIS

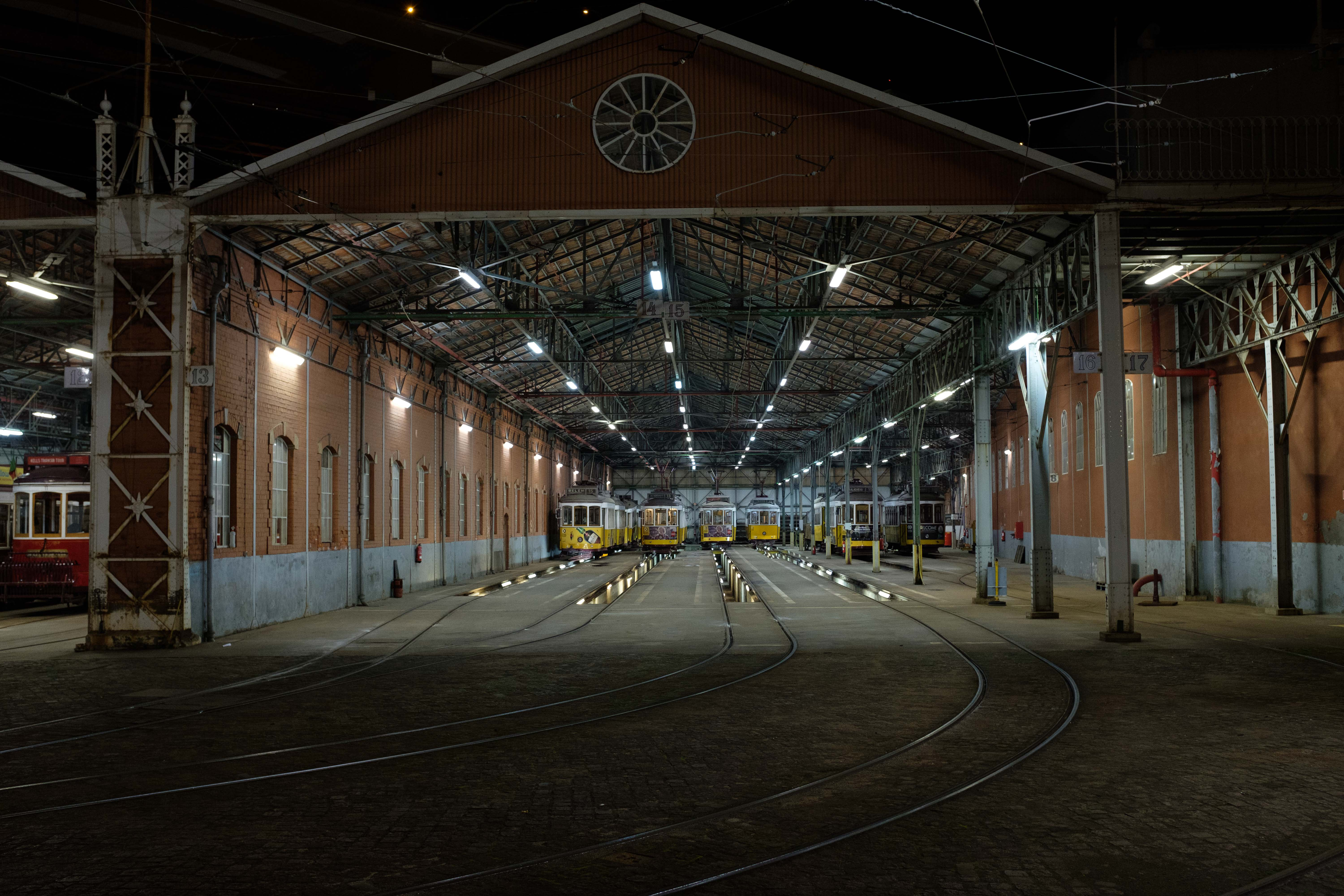
Night view of the museum exterior, as seen from the street.

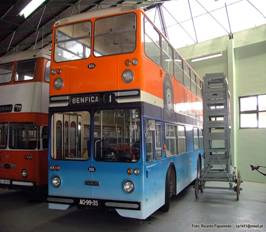
Example of the 1970s bus operated by CARRIS

This main museum is organised chronologically into thematic rooms, beginning with the establishment of the company and creation of animal traction vehicles, followed by the appearance of the funiculars, adoption of electric traction vehicles and followed by 20th century innovations. Documents and objects used in daily operation mark many of the exhibits on display. There are various models depicting the trams, buses and funiculars, as well as a reconstructed administrative area and medical centre.

The connection between the different exhibition areas is done by a short trip on a tram of the museum collection dating back to 1901. Its current appearance is that of the 1960s, when it was adapted for tourist services.

The secondary exhibits contains vehicles and workshop machinery, installed in two pavilions, that were inactive, renovated workshops

In the first pavilion the visitor finds a collection of animal and electric traction vehicles renovated from the service starting date and which establishes the link between the end of the 19th century and the end of the 1940s.

This chronological route extends to the second pavilion where apart from the reconstruction of a sub-station and a printing workshop with all its equipment, one finds electric trams and buses which establish the bridge between the beginning of the 1950s to the present day.

The Carris Museum often invests in new initiatives, the ‘Sala Multimedia’ (Multimedia Room) being one of these.

In this film room visitors can see the ‘Viagens com Vida’, which brings together the unique related experiences of former employees of the company while working for Carris.

The museum also has a shop where the general public can acquire a variety of objects relating to Carris and to its museum.

In the recently inaugurated third section, the visitor comes into contact with different vehicles, from those used at work to public service buses pending restoration.

The visit ends in the Gallery where temporary exhibitions from paintings, sculpture and photography are done.

Apart from the exhibited objects, the museum has set aside various pieces of historical interest from vehicles (buses and trams), numerous workshop parts, old tickets and objects of everyday life of the company.

=== Documentation Centre ===
The museum's Documentation Centre is to make Carris’ documents, books, and plans concerning the company and public transport's history available to the visitor or researcher.

=== Educational Service ===
The Carris Museum also organises guided visits for groups, games activities, workshops, children's birthday parties, all subject to reservation.
