= Robert Hunt (cricketer, born 1903) =

English cricketer (1903–1983)

Cricket information
- Batting: Right-handed
- Bowling: Right-arm fast-medium

Career statistics
Competition	First-class
Matches	8
Runs scored	138
Batting average	19.71
100s/50s	0/1
Top score	81*
Catches/stumpings	3/–
- Source: Cricinfo, 5 March 2021

Robert Norman Hunt (24 September 1903 – 13 October 1983) was an English first-class cricketer who played for Middlesex between 1926 and 1928.

Hunt was a leading club cricketer between the world wars, captaining Barclays Bank Cricket Club and also Club Cricket Conference elevens. He played in eight first-class matches for Middlesex between 1926 and 1928 as a right-handed batsman and right-arm fast-medium bowler. He scored 138 runs (average 19.71), with a personal best of 81 not out versus Worcestershire in 1926. He also took five wickets (average 89.80) with a personal best of 3/32.
