= George Lowles =

English cricketer (1865–1940)

George William Lowles (27 July 1865 – 12 January 1940) was an English first-class cricketer active 1887–89 who played for Middlesex and Surrey. He was a wicketkeeper who was born and died in London.
