= David Hayward (cricketer) =

English cricketer

David Russell Hayward (7 June 1920 – 21 April 1945) was an English first-class cricketer active in 1939 who played for Middlesex and Oxford University. He was born in Australia; and died in Hampshire.

During World War II Hayward was a pilot in the Air Transport Auxiliary. On 21 April 1945 he was flying a Fairchild Argus light aircraft which crashed soon after take-off from RAF Lasham in Hampshire.
