= Arthur Tanner =

English cricketer

Arthur Ralph Tanner (25 December 1889 – 16 August 1966) was an English first-class cricketer active 1920–29 who played for Middlesex. He played 10 games in the team which retained the County Championship in 1921 with The Cricketer reporting that he made a great name for himself as a specialist gully fielder, taking 21 catches. He was born in Bromley; died in Edgware.
