= Albert Snow =

English cricketer

Albert Henry Percival Snow (9 August 1852 – 5 April 1909) was an English first-class cricketer active 1874–80 who played for Middlesex. He was born in Bedford; died in Gunnersbury.
