= John Westhorp =

English cricketer

John White Westhorp (9 January 1868 – 24 March 1935) was an English first-class cricketer active 1888–94 who played for Middlesex. He was born in St Pancras, London; died in Purley.
