= Len Dolding =

English cricketer and footballer

Desmond Leonard Dolding (13 December 1922 – 23 November 1954) was an English footballer and cricketer.

Born in Nundygroog, South India, Dolding served as a bomb-aimer in the Royal Air Force during the Second World War. He moved to Harrow aged 16 where he would live for the rest of his life. He married Barbara Mason, also of Harrow, in May 1945 and they had a son, Michael, who was born the following year. They met at Kodak where they both worked, Dolding in the Research Department until 1943 when he joined the RAF.

After playing as an amateur for the RAF football team he signed as a professional playing as a winger for Chelsea (27 league appearances in 1946 – 1948) and Norwich City (12 appearances between 1948 and 1951). He played non-league football for Wealdstone, Dover and Margate. Played in winning Wealdstone team in Middlesex Sports Red Cross final at Wembley in 1942 – beating RAF, Uxbridge in extra time. (said to be first amateur final played at Wembley) Dolding was in the team that won three senior Middlesex Senior Cup finals between 1940 and 1943.

He was on the Marylebone Cricket Club (MCC) staff for seven years. An excellent fielder, his main claim to fame on the cricket pitch was as twelfth man for England in several Lord's Test Matches since the war and in 1953 was sent for at Leeds when England suffered several injuries against Australia . He played only once for Middlesex, against Yorkshire in 1951, but appeared frequently for the MCC as a right-arm leg-break bowler. Prior to his death he had obtained his advanced cricket coaching certificate from Lilleshall.

On 12 November 1954, Dolding was a passenger in a car that collided with a trolleybus standard in Wembley. The car was being driven by Middlesex teammate Syd Brown on their way back from a Cross Arrows Cricket Club dinner, the club they both played for. Dolding died on 23 November 1954.

In December 1954 a memorial fund was launched and his former clubs, Chelsea and Margate and the Margate Supporters' Club both donated 100 guineas. The fund raised around £700. He left £3160 net. His son was able to attend Millfield School, where he played for the rugby team. He went on to captain Norfolk.
