= Timothy Bevington =

English/Canadian cricketer

Personal information
- Full name: Timothy Arthur Dent Bevington
- Born: 22 August 1881; Great Amwell, Hertfordshire, England
- Died: 4 May 1966 (aged 84); Vancouver, British Columbia, Canada
- Batting: Left-handed
- Relatives: John Bevington (brother)

Domestic team information
- Years: Team
- 1913: Canada and United States of America
- 1901–1904: Marylebone Cricket Club
- 1900–1904: Middlesex

Career statistics
Competition	First-class
Matches	14
Runs scored	359
Batting average	17.95
100s/50s	–/2
Top score	91
Balls bowled	175
Wickets	3
Bowling average	25.66
5 wickets in innings	–
10 wickets in match	–
Best bowling	3/21
Catches/stumpings	4/–
- Source: CricketArchive, 14 October 2011

Timothy Arthur Dent Bevington (22 August 1881 – 4 May 1966) was an English and Canadian cricketer. He was a left-handed batsman. He played 14 first-class matches between 1900 and 1913, mainly for Middlesex and the Marylebone Cricket Club (MCC). He later settled in Canada and played his last first-class match for a combined Canada/USA team against Australia. He died in Vancouver in 1966, aged 84.

He was born in Amwell House, Hertfordshire.

He was educated at Harrow School.
