= John Berners =

English cricketer (1869–1934)

John Anstruther Berners (23 September 1869 – 2 March 1934) was an English first-class cricketer active 1904 who played for Middlesex. He was born in Westminster; died in Suffolk.
