= Thomas Ratliff =

English cricketer

Personal information
- Born: 31 March 1836; Camberwell, London
- Batting: Right-handed
- Bowling: Right-arm Slow
- Role: Batsman and underarm bowler
- Relatives: Henry E Ratliff (nephew)

Thomas Ratliff (31 March 1836 – unknown) was an English first-class cricketer active 1869–80 who played and worked for Middlesex and Warwickshire. He was born in Camberwell.

He described himself on the 1881 census as a merchant. He had secretarial experience with the Liverpool club. His first task was to raise funds for the new ground which he had not achieved. This was soon followed by him resigning at the end of the 1887 season.
