= Harold Wyatt =

English cricketer

Harold Douglas Wyatt (12 January 1880 – 24 November 1949) was an English first-class cricketer active 1905–09 who played for Middlesex. He was born in Enfield, Middlesex; died in Southwark.
