= Cecil Gold =

English cricketer

Cecil Argo Gold (3 June 1887 – 3 July 1916) was an English first-class cricketer active 1907 who played for Middlesex. He was born in St Pancras, London; died in Ovillers la Boiselle, France, on active service during World War I.
