= Charles Tebbut =

English cricketer

Charles Mansfield Tebbut (24 December 1839 – 27 September 1898) was an English first-class cricketer active 1866–70 who played for Middlesex. He was born in Wanstead, Essex and died in South Hampstead, Middlesex. He played in six first-class matches.
