= William Birch (English cricketer) =

English cricketer

Personal information
- Full name: William Birch
- Born: 10 February 1863; Isleworth, Middlesex, England
- Died: 11 December 1940 (aged 77); Isleworth, Middlesex, England
- Batting: Right-handed
- Bowling: Right-arm medium-fast

Domestic team information
- Years: Team
- 1887: Middlesex

Career statistics
Competition	First-class
Matches	2
Runs scored	6
Batting average	2.00
100s/50s	–/–
Top score	4
Balls bowled	236
Wickets	2
Bowling average	47.50
5 wickets in innings	–
10 wickets in match	–
Best bowling	2/28
Catches/stumpings	–/–
- Source: Cricinfo, 25 January 2013

William Birch (10 February 1863 – 11 December 1940) was an English cricketer. Birch was a right-handed batsman who bowled right-arm medium-fast. He was born at Isleworth, Middlesex.

Birch made two first-class appearances for Middlesex in the 1887 against Surrey at Lords, and Oxford University at Chiswick Park Cricket Ground. He scored 6 runs in his two matches and took 2 wickets at an average of 47.50.

He died at the town of his birth on 11 December 1940.
