= Leonard Burtt =

English cricketer

Leonard Lionel Burtt (4 February 1886 – 8 November 1942) was an English first-class cricketer active 1921 who played for Middlesex. He was born in Hammersmith; died in Hampstead.
