= Edward Marsden (cricketer) =

English cricketer

Edward Marsden (25 July 1870 – 2 July 1946) was an English cricketer. He was a left-handed batsman and a left-arm fast bowler who played for Middlesex. He was born in Belsize Park and died in Hampstead.

Marsden made a single first-class appearance for the team, in 1897, against the Gentlemen of Philadelphia. Batting in the tail-end, he scored 3 runs in the only innings in which he batted. He bowled 21 overs in the match, taking 1–45 in the first innings and 0–23 in the second.
