= Percival Kemp =

English cricketer

Percival Hepworth Kemp (2 July 1888 – 14 February 1974) was an English first-class cricketer active 1919 who played for Middlesex. He was born in Luton; died in Islington.
