= Percy Hale =

English cricketer

Percy William Hale (7 February 1874 – 8 January 1933) was an English first-class cricketer active 1900 who played for Middlesex. He was born in Kensington; died in Harrow, Middlesex.
