= John Hake =

English cricketer

George John Gordon Hake (24 August 1918 – 1 April 2013 (aged 94)) was an English first-class cricketer.

The Epsom-born John Hake was educated at Bromsgrove School and represented Middlesex in one first-class match during the 1948 English cricket season.

He died in Godstone, Surrey on 1 April 2013 aged 94.
