= Ray Munt =

English cricketer

Harry Raymond Munt (31 October 1902 – 27 December 1965) was an English first-class cricketer, active 1923–30, who played for Middlesex. He was born in Paddington; died in Derby.
