= John Shenton =

English cricketer

John Charles Shenton (20 January 1862 – 26 January 1900) was an English first-class cricketer active in 1888 who played for Middlesex. He was born in Bethnal Green and died in Harlow.
