= Puddington, Devon =

Village in Devon, England

Coordinates: 50.884°N 3.661°W

Puddington
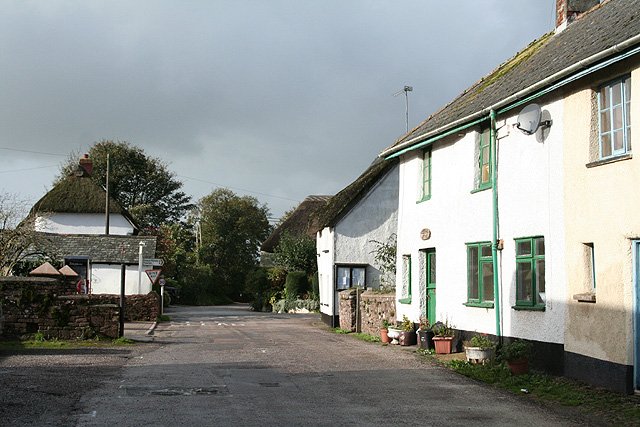
- Puddington village

- Location within Devon
- OS grid reference: SS8325410705
- District: Mid Devon
- Shire county: Devon
- Region: South West
- Country: England
- Sovereign state: United Kingdom
- Post town: Tiverton
- Postcode district: EX16
- Police: Devon and Cornwall
- Fire: Devon and Somerset
- Ambulance: South Western
- UK Parliament: Central Devon
- Website: puddington.org.uk

Puddington is a small village in Mid Devon within the Witheridge hundred. It is approximately nine miles from the town of Tiverton and 8 Miles from Crediton. During the reign of Edward (1003–1066) the land was held by Aethelweard.

Puddington or Potitone was mentioned in the Domesday book as being held by Ralph De Pomeroy for William Chevre/Cheever (his brother). It paid geld for 1 hide, had land for 8 ploughs, 3 slaves, 8 villains, 6 borders, 9 acres of meadow, 5 acres of pasture and 2 acres of scrubland. The land escheated to the crown during the reign of King Henry 1 (1100–1135) who granted them to his illegitimate son William 1 de Tracy (Died c. 1136). The grandson of William 1 de Tracy was one of the 4 knights responsible for the murder of Thomas a Becket, this could be the reason for the 15th Century church in the village being consecrated to St Thomas of Canterbury. The building has Grade II listed status.

Puddington" means "estate associated with a man named Putta".
