= Roger White (cricketer) =

English cricketer

Personal information
- Full name: Roger Frank White
- Born: 22 November 1943 (age 82); Perivale, Middlesex, England
- Batting: Right-handed
- Bowling: Slow left-arm orthodox

Domestic team information
- Years: Team
- 1964–1966: Middlesex

Career statistics
Competition	First-class
Matches	13
Runs scored	18
Batting average	3.60
100s/50s	–/–
Top score	7*
Balls bowled	1,202
Wickets	17
Bowling average	30.47
5 wickets in innings	–
10 wickets in match	–
Best bowling	4/79
Catches/stumpings	4/–
- Source: Cricinfo, 15 March 2012

Roger Frank White (born 22 November 1943) is a former English cricketer. White was a right-handed batsman who bowled slow left-arm orthodox. He was born at Perivale, Sussex.

White made his first-class debut for Middlesex against Nottinghamshire in 1964 County Championship. He made twelve further first-class appearances for the county, the last of which came against Oxford University in 1966. In his thirteen first-class matches for Middlesex, he took 17 wickets at an average of 30.47, with best figures of 4/79. A tailend batsman, he scored a total of 18 runs at an average of 3.60, with a high score of 7 not out.
