= Bertram Carris =

English cricketer

Personal information
- Full name: Bertram Dudley Carris
- Born: 23 October 1917; Flixton, Lancashire, England
- Died: 19 August 2000 (aged 82); Plumstead, Western Cape, South Africa
- Batting: Right-handed
- Bowling: Left-arm slow orthodox

Domestic team information
- Years: Team
- 1937–39: Middlesex
- 1938–39: Cambridge University

Career statistics
Competition	First-class
Matches	32
Runs scored	1214
Batting average	22.90
100s/50s	0/7
Top score	87
Balls bowled	1868
Wickets	26
Bowling average	36.73
5 wickets in innings	0
10 wickets in match	0
Best bowling	4/59
Catches/stumpings	14/–
- Source: Cricket Archive, 28 August 2015

Bertram Dudley Carris (23 October 1917 – 19 August 2000) was an English cricketer who played first-class cricket for Middlesex and Cambridge University between 1937 and 1939.

Carris was educated at Harrow, and played in the First XI, which he captained in 1936. He went up to St John's College, Cambridge, later that year.

Carris made his first-class debut for Middlesex in July 1937, opening the batting with Fred Price in three matches. In his second match he made 65 and added 129 for the second wicket with Bill Edrich.

He played seven matches for Cambridge in 1938, with a best performance of 43 and 79 together with 2 for 60 and 2 for 19 with his left-arm spin against Glamorgan. He was awarded his cricket Blue. He also won a Blue at golf.

Carris played a full season for Cambridge in 1939, making his highest score of 87 against Surrey and scoring 44 and 36 in a narrow loss to Oxford University in the next match. He played the rest of the season with Middlesex, but without conspicuous success.

Carris served as an officer with the Scots Guards during World War II. He was reported wounded and missing during the campaign in Libya in 1942.
