= Haycroft Stirling =

English cricketer

Haycroft Stirling (8 February 1908 – 7 May 1952) was an English first-class cricketer active 1931–42 who played for Middlesex. He was born in Barnet; died in West Byfleet.
