= Frederick Hawkins (cricketer) =

English cricketer

Personal information
- Full name: Frederick Albert Hawkins
- Born: 11 December 1888; Wandsworth, Surrey
- Died: 12 September 1975 (aged 86); Elstead, Surrey
- Batting: Right-handed
- Bowling: Right-arm medium

Domestic team information
- Years: Team
- 1927: Middlesex
- Source: CricInfo, 28 May 2022

Frederick Albert Hawkins (11 December 1888 – 12 September 1975) was an English first-class cricketer who played in two matches for Middlesex County Cricket Club in 1927.

Hawkins was born at Wandsworth, then part of Surrey, in 1888. He made his Middlesex debut as an amateur batsman in a county championship match against Somerset at Weston-super-Mare in August 1927, before playing in the county's following match, a championship fixture against Essex at Lord's. Both matches were rain-affected and Hawkins scored a total of 19 runs in the two innings in which he batted. He played club cricket for Ealing Cricket Club and played matches for MCC in 1930 and 1931.

Hawkins died at Elstead in Surrey in 1975. He was aged 86.
