= Thomas Hampton (cricketer) =

English cricketer

Tom Hampton
Personal information
- Full name: Thomas Robert Gareth Hampton
- Born: 5 October 1990 (age 36); Kingston upon Thames, Surrey, England
- Batting: Right-handed
- Bowling: Right-arm medium-fast
- Role: Bowler

Domestic team information
- Years: Team
- 2010: Middlesex
- 2015–2016: Gloucestershire (squad no. 16)
- FC debut: 25 May 2010 Middlesex v Oxford MCCU

Career statistics
Competition	First-class
Matches	4
Runs scored	1
Batting average	1.00
100s/50s	0/0
Top score	1*
Balls bowled	408
Wickets	3
Bowling average	106.66
5 wickets in innings	0
10 wickets in match	0
Best bowling	1/15
Catches/stumpings	0/–
- Source: CricketArchive, 21 July 2016

Thomas Robert Gareth Hampton (born 5 October 1990) is an English cricketer. Hampton is a right-handed batsman who bowls right-arm fast. He was born at Kingston upon Thames, Surrey, and was educated at the John Hampden Grammar School in Buckinghamshire.

Having played for the Middlesex Second XI since 2008, Hampton made a single first-class appearance for Middlesex against Oxford MCCU at the University Parks in 2010. Hampton wasn't required to bat in Middlesex's first-innings of 399/2 declared, which in Oxford MCCU's first-innings of 277, he bowled 7 wicketless overs. Middlesex made 186/9 declared in their second-innings, with Hampton ending the innings unbeaten on one run. He took the wicket of Aaron Jeavons in Oxford MCCU's second-innings of 207 all out, finishing with figures of 1/15 from 7 overs.
