= Bill Higginson (cricketer) =

English cricketer (1936–2025)

Thomas William Higginson, MBE (6 November 1936 – August 2025) was an English first-class cricketer.

Known as Bill, he represented Middlesex in three first-class matches and once for L. C. Stevens XI in 1961, against Cambridge University, where Bill batted above Sir Len Hutton. He became the youngest ever recipient of the M.C.C. Advanced Coaching Certificate aged only 20. He later served as a coach and umpire. In 2020, he was awarded the MBE for his community service.
