= Geoffrey Atkinson =

English cricketer

Personal information
- Full name: Geoffrey Bean Atkinson
- Born: 29 January 1896; Lambeth, London, England
- Died: 1 September 1951 (aged 55); Bognor Regis, Sussex, England
- Batting: Right-handed
- Bowling: Right-arm fast-medium

Domestic team information
- Years: Team
- 1930: Middlesex

Career statistics
Competition	FC
Matches	3
Runs scored	25
Batting average	6.25
100s/50s	–/–
Top score	14
Balls bowled	108
Wickets	2
Bowling average	28.50
5 wickets in innings	–
10 wickets in match	–
Best bowling	2/27
Catches/stumpings	2/–
- Source: Cricinfo, 26 February 2011

Geoffrey Bean Atkinson (29 January 1896 – 1 September 1951) was an English first-class cricketer. Atkinson was a right-handed batsman who bowled right-arm fast-medium. He was born in Lambeth, London.

Atkinson made two first-class appearances for Middlesex in 1930, making his debut against Yorkshire in the County Championship in June and playing against Leicestershire in July. His other first-class appearance came in 1933 for HDG Leveson-Gower's XI against Oxford University. In his three first-class matches he scored 25 runs at a batting average of 6.25, with a high score of 14. With the ball he took 2 wickets at a bowling average of 28.50, with best figures of 2/28 against Oxford University. He also played a number of non-notable matches for the Marylebone Cricket Club from 1928 to 1936.

He died in Bognor Regis, Sussex on 1 September 1951.
