= Thomas Fox (Middlesex cricketer) =

English cricketer

Thomas Seely Fox (23 August 1878 – 3 April 1931) was an English first-class cricketer active 1905 who played for Middlesex as a wicketkeeper. He was born in Upton, Essex; died in Bournemouth.
