= Sam Atkinson =

English cricketer

Nigel Samuel Mitford Atkinson (26 July 1899 – 24 October 1966) was an English first-class cricketer who played for Middlesex in two matches in the 1923 season. He was a right-handed batsman and a left-arm bowler.

An amateur cricketer from the Hampstead Cricket Club, Atkinson played two consecutive matches for Middlesex in a week in May 1923. In the first match, he took five Essex wickets for just 16 runs with his left-arm spin bowling in the first innings; in the second game, he took seven wickets across two Cambridge University innings, and made a score of 39 with the bat.

Atkinson's younger brother Bernard also played for Middlesex.
