= Thomas Cuming (cricketer) =

English cricketer

Thomas Cuming (21 April 1893 – 18 August 1960) was an English first-class cricketer active 1913–1931 who played for Middlesex. He was born in Woolwich; died in Bexhill.
