= Roger Pearman (cricketer) =

English cricketer and cricket administrator

Roger Pearman (13 February 1943 – 9 April 2009) was an English cricketer and cricket administrator.

Born in Lichfield, Staffordshire, Pearman represented Middlesex (1962–1964), Minor Counties South (1973), Bedfordshire (1973) and Minor Counties North (1974–1975) as a right-handed batsman and a right-arm off-break bowler. He was a successful batsman and captain for Hornsey Cricket Club, and helped found the Middlesex County League.

He was Chief Executive of Derbyshire County Cricket Club between 1981 and April 1987, where he was instrumental in bringing the club's organisation and facilities up to a much improved standard and returning the club's finances to profit. However, he met with opposition from some on the committee and was sacked.

His younger brother Hugh also represented Middlesex.
