= Frederick Winterburn =

English cricketer

Frederick Winterburn (10 December 1857 – 21 April 1926) was an English first-class cricketer active in 1883 who played for Middlesex. He was born in London; died in Hackney.
