= Frank Clifford (cricketer) =

English cricketer

Frank Leonard Clifford (29 August 1891 – 13 June 1982) was an English first-class cricketer active 1921 who played for Middlesex. He was born in Westminster; died in Enfield, Middlesex. He was an MCC ground staff bowler.
