= Edward Lester (Middlesex cricketer) =

English cricketer

Edward Lester (dates unknown) was an English first-class cricketer active 1929–31 who played for Middlesex.

Full name Edward Lester

Major teams Middlesex

Batting style Right-hand bat

Bowling style Right-arm medium

Batting and fielding averages

Full name	Mat	Inns	NO	Runs	HS	Ave	100	50	Ct	St
First-class	7	11	4	41	13	5.85	0	0	0	0

Bowling averages

Full name	Mat	Balls	Runs	Wkts	BBI	BBM	Ave	Econ	SR	4w	5w	10
First-class	7	18	10	0	-	-	-	3.33	-	0	0	0

Career statistics

First-class span	1929 - 1930
