= George Osborn (cricketer) =

English cricketer (1850–1913)

George Newland Osborn (18 December 1850 – 3 March 1913) was an English first-class cricketer active in 1881 who played for Middlesex. He was born in Havering Atte Bower, Essex; died in Westminster.
