= Harold Carris =

English cricketer

Harold Edward Carris (7 July 1909 – 29 July 1959) was an English first-class cricketer active 1928–33 who played for Middlesex. He was born in Flixton, Lancashire; died in Cheadle Hulme.
