= Llewellyn Thomas (English cricketer) =

English cricketer

Personal information
- Full name: Llewellyn Thomas
- Born: 16 February 1865; Clifton, Bristol, England
- Died: 21 August 1924 (aged 59); Little Waltham, Essex, England
- Role: Wicketkeeper

Domestic team information
- Years: Team
- 1893: Middlesex

Career statistics
Competition	FC
Matches	1
Runs scored	0
Batting average	0.00
100s/50s	–/–
Top score	0*
Balls bowled	–
Wickets	–
Bowling average	–
5 wickets in innings	–
10 wickets in match	–
Best bowling	–
Catches/stumpings	5/–
- Source: Cricinfo, 20 May 2010

Llewellyn Thomas (16 February 1865 – 21 August 1924) was an English cricketer. Thomas played primarily as a wicketkeeper.

Thomas represented Middlesex in a single first-class match in 1893 against Yorkshire. In the Middlesex first innings, Thomas was stumped for a duck by David Hunter from the bowling of Bobby Peel. Thomas was unbeaten on 0 when Middlesex's second innings came to an end. Keeping wicket, he also took 5 catches.
