= Charles Teape =

English cricketer

Charles Ashley Teape (16 February 1844 – 1 August 1925) was an English first-class cricketer active 1863–72 who played for Middlesex. He was born in Blackheath, Kent; died in Chelsea. His brother, Arthur, also played first-class cricket.
