= Gerald Winter =

English cricketer (1876–1923)

Gerald Esdaile Winter (29 November 1876 – 17 January 1923) was an English first-class cricketer active 1896–1908 who played for Middlesex and Cambridge University. He was born in Kensington; died in Marylebone.
