= Henry Weston (cricketer) =

English cricketer

Henry Weston (2 January 1888 – unknown) was an English first-class cricketer active 1909–14 who played for Middlesex. He was born in Hurlingham, Putney.
