= Arthur Kemp (Middlesex cricketer) =

English cricketer

Personal information
- Full name: Arthur Lock Kemp
- Born: 25 December 1868; Kentish Town, London, England
- Died: 1 March 1929 (aged 60); Monken Hadley, Hertfordshire, England

Domestic team information
- Years: Team
- 1890 1894: Middlesex County Cricket Club

Arthur Lock Kemp (15 December 1868 – 1 March 1929) was an English cricketer who played first-class cricket in two matches for Middlesex, one each in 1890 and 1894. He was born at Kentish Town in London and died at Monken Hadley, Hertfordshire.
