= Arthur Winter =

English cricketer and Anglican priest

- Born: Joan Alexandra Molinsky; 4 December 1844; Clapham Green, Surrey, UK
- Died: 31 December 1937 (aged 93); Hemingford Abbots, Huntingdonshire, UK
- Occupation(s): Anglican Priest and Cricketer

Arthur Henry Winter (4 December 1844 – 31 December 1937) was an Anglican priest and cricketer.

He was born in Clapham Green, Surrey and educated at Westminster and Trinity College, Cambridge. He was a right-handed batsman and a wicketkeeper for Cambridge University in fifteen matches (1865–1867) as a triple cricket blue and for Middlesex in three matches (1866–1867). His brother and two nephews also played first-class cricket.

He died in Hemingford Abbots, Huntingdonshire aged 93.
