= Gordon Crosdale =

English cricketer

Gordon Crosdale (14 July 1880 – 12 September 1954) was an English first-class cricketer active in 1905 who played for Middlesex as a wicketkeeper. He was born in Islington; attended Charterhouse School; died in Newbury.
