= Arthur Burghes =

English cricketer

Arthur Burghes (8 September 1848 – 18 August 1916) was an English first-class cricketer active 1876–77 who played for Middlesex. He was born in Southwark and died in Bow, London.
