= Lucas Bacmeister (cricketer) =

English cricketer

Lucas Henry Bacmeister (22 November 1869 – 23 May 1962) was an English first-class cricketer active 1889–1904 who played for Middlesex. He was born in Islington; died in Barham, Kent. He wrote articles for The Cricketer.
