= William Soppitt =

English cricketer (1856–1910)

William John Blair Soppitt (30 December 1856 – 29 October 1910) was an English first-class cricketer active 1887–88 who played for Middlesex. He was born in Maidstone; died in Shepherd's Bush.
