= John McEwen (cricketer) =

English cricketer

John William McEwen (25 November 1862 – 16 February 1902) was an English first-class cricketer active 19yy–yy who played for Middlesex. He was born in Dalston; died in Stepney.
