= Arthur Francis (Middlesex cricketer) =

English cricketer

Arthur Stopford Francis (14 June 1854 – January 1908) was an English first-class cricketer active 1880–87 who played for Middlesex. He was born in Upminster; it is not known where he died.
