= Hugh Pearman (cricketer) =

English cricketer (born 1945)

Hugh Pearman (born 1 June 1945 in Edgbaston, Birmingham, England) is a former English cricketer.

Pearman studied at Churchill College, Cambridge, and represented Cambridge University in 1969 and Middlesex from 1969 to 1972 in twelve first-class and three List A matches as right-handed batsman and a slow left-arm orthodox bowler. He scored one first-class half-century, in his last game in 1972, and took 16 wickets. He scored a first-class century, 133, opening the batting for Cambridge against Marylebone Cricket Club (MCC) in July 1969, but the status of the match was changed to non-first-class a few weeks later.

His elder brother Roger also represented Middlesex.
