= George Hebden (cricketer) =

English cricketer

George Lockwood Hebden (16 December 1879 – 11 June 1946) was an English first-class cricketer active 1908–19 who played for Middlesex. He was born in Brentford; died in Bournemouth.
