= List of Marylebone Cricket Club players (1919–1939) =

Cricketers who debuted for Marylebone Cricket Club (MCC) in first-class matches during the inter-war period from 1919 until September 1939, after which first-class cricket was suspended until the 1945 season, are as follows. Many of the players represented MCC after the Second World War but they are only listed here, as it was in this period that they made their MCC debuts.

The club always played its home matches at its Lord's venue in north London. The majority of MCC players in this period were contracted to county clubs or one of the two main university teams and appeared for MCC by invitation. Some players were from other countries. For much of the 20th century, MCC organised international tours in which the England cricket team played Test matches. The players selected for these tours were contracted to MCC for the duration and appearances by them in non-Tests on the tour were for MCC, therefore all such players are included in this list. MCC teams have always operated at all levels of the sport and players who represented the club in minor cricket only are out of scope here.

The details are the player's usual name followed by the span of years in which he was active as an MCC player in first-class matches (the span may include years in which he played in minor matches only for MCC and/or years in which he did not represent MCC in any matches) and then his name is given as it appeared on match scorecards (e.g., surname preceded by all initials), followed by the club or team with which he was mostly associated (this may be MCC itself). Players who took part in Test cricket have their names highlighted in bold text.

== A ==
- George Abell (1935–1939) : G. E. B. Abell (Worcestershire)
- Ronnie Aird (1927–1939) : R. Aird (Hampshire)
- Ian Akers-Douglas (1930) : I. S. Akers-Douglas (Kent)
- Antony Allen (1934) : A. W. Allen (Northamptonshire)
- Basil Allen (1936–1939) : B. O. Allen (Gloucestershire)
- **Gubby Allen** (1923–1953) : G. O. B. Allen (Middlesex). Tours: South America (1926/27); Australia & New Zealand (1932/33); Australia & New Zealand (1936/37); West Indies (1947/48).
- **Maurice Allom** (1928–1937) : M. J. C. Allom (Surrey). Tours: Australia & New Zealand (1929/30); South Africa (1930/31).
- **Les Ames** (1928/29–1938/39) : L. E. G. Ames (Kent). Tours: Australia (1928/29); West Indies (1929/30); Australia & New Zealand (1932/33); West Indies (1934/35); Australia & New Zealand (1936/37); South Africa (1938/39).
- Edward Armitage (1929–1931) : E. L. Armitage (Hampshire)
- Trevor Arnott (1931–1934/35) : T. Arnott (Glamorgan). Tours: West Indies (1934/35).
- Hubert Ashton (1927) : H. Ashton (Essex)

== B ==
- Edgar Backhouse (1932) : E. N. Backhouse (Yorkshire)
- Hamer Bagnall (1926–1929) : H. F. Bagnall (Northamptonshire)
- Jim Bailey (1934–1935) : J. Bailey (Hampshire)
- **Fred Bakewell** (1933/34) : A. H. Bakewell (Northamptonshire). Tours: India & Ceylon (1933/34).
- **Wilf Barber** (1935/36) : W. Barber (Yorkshire). Tours: Australia & New Zealand (1935/36).
- Giles Baring (1935–1946) : A. E. G. Baring (Hampshire)
- John Barnes (1928–1931) : J. R. Barnes (Lancashire)
- **Charlie Barnett** (1933/34–1948) : C. J. Barnett (Gloucestershire). Tours: India & Ceylon (1933/34); Australia & New Zealand (1936/37).
- **Fred Barratt** (1929/30) : F. Barratt (Nottinghamshire). Tours: Australia & New Zealand (1929/30).
- Hugh Bartlett (1936–1946) : H. T. Bartlett (Sussex). Tours: South Africa (1938/39).
- Oliver Battcock (1938–1939) : O. G. Battcock (Buckinghamshire)
- Arthur Baxter (1935–1937) : A. D. Baxter (Lancashire, Middlesex). Tours: Australia & New Zealand (1935/36).
- George Beet junior (1928–1938) : G. H. C. Beet (Derbyshire)
- George Beet senior (1920) : G. Beet (Derbyshire)
- Brian Belle (1934) : B. H. Belle (Essex)
- Herbert Benka (1939) : H. F. Benka (Middlesex)
- Tris Bennett (1925/26–1928) : C. T. Bennett (Middlesex, Surrey). Tours: West Indies (1925/26).
- Edward Benson (1929/30) : E. T. Benson (Gloucestershire). Tours: Australia & New Zealand (1929/30).
- William Berridge (1919) : W. C. M. Berridge (Leicestershire)
- Reg Bettington (1928–1938) : R. H. B. Bettington (New South Wales, Middlesex)
- Edward Bleackley (1919) : E. O. Bleackley (Lancashire)
- Spencer Block (1933–1936) : S. A. Block (Surrey)
- Denis Blundell (1928) : E. D. Blundell (Cambridge University)
- **Roger Blunt** (1934) : R. C. Blunt (Canterbury, Otago)
- **Bill Bowes** (1928–1937) : W. E. Bowes (Yorkshire). Tours: Australia & New Zealand (1932/33).
- **Ted Bowley** (1929/30) : E. H. Bowley (Sussex). Tours: Australia & New Zealand (1929/30).
- Stuart Boyes (1926/27) : G. S. Boyes (Hampshire). Tours: India & Ceylon (1926/27).
- David Brand, 5th Viscount Hampden (1922/23) : D. F. Brand (Cambridge University). Tours: Australia & New Zealand (1922/23).
- John Brocklebank (1938–1948) : J. M. Brocklebank (Lancashire)
- Geoffrey Brooke-Taylor (1928) : G. P. Brooke-Taylor (Derbyshire)
- Ronald Brooks (1921) : R. C. Brooks (Cambridge University)
- **Freddie Brown** (1932–1957) : F. R. Brown (Surrey, Northamptonshire). Tours: Australia & New Zealand (1932/33); Australia & New Zealand (1950/51); South Africa (1956/57).
- Rainy Brown (1932) : G. R. R. Brown (Essex)
- Stanley Brown (1930–1933) : S. H. Brown (Wiltshire)
- Syd Brown (1937–1950) : S. M. Brown (Middlesex)
- Jack Bryan (1924/25) : J. L. Bryan (Kent). Tours: Australia (1924/25).
- Robin Buckston (1929–1930) : R. H. R. Buckston (Derbyshire)
- Brocas Burrows (1921) : M. B. Burrows (Surrey)
- Frederick Burton (1921–1925) : F. A. Burton (Hertfordshire)
- Richard Busk (1920–1922) : R. D. Busk (Hampshire)
- Reginald Butterworth (1930–1939) : R. E. C. Butterworth (Middlesex)

== C ==
- Alexander Cadell (1927) : A. R. Cadell (Hampshire)
- **Freddie Calthorpe** (1922/23–1935) : F. S. G. Calthorpe (Sussex, Warwickshire). Tours: Australia & New Zealand (1922/23); West Indies (1925/26); West Indies (1929/30).
- Ion Campbell (1927) : I. P. F. Campbell (Surrey)
- Ernest Canning (1929) : E. G. Canning (Middlesex)
- **Arthur Carr** (1922–1926) : A. W. Carr (Nottinghamshire). Tours: South Africa (1922/23).
- Peter Cazalet (1928) : P. V. F. Cazalet (Kent)
- Gerry Chalk (1938–1939) : F. G. H. Chalk (Kent)
- George Challenor (1926) : G. Challenor (Barbados)
- Geoffrey Chance (1922) : G. H. B. Chance (Hampshire)
- **Percy Chapman** (1920–1939) : A. P. F. Chapman (Kent). Tours: Australia & New Zealand (1922/23); Australia (1924/25); Australia (1928/29); South Africa (1930/31).
- Raleigh Chichester-Constable (1926/27) : R. C. J. Chichester-Constable (Yorkshire). Tours: India & Ceylon (1926/27).
- **Nobby Clark** (1933/34) : E. W. Clark (Northamptonshire). Tours: India & Ceylon (1933/34).
- **Johnnie Clay** (1923–1928) : J. C. Clay (Glamorgan)
- **Shunter Coen** (1927/28) : S. K. Coen (Free State cricket team|Orange Free State). Tours: South Africa (1927/28).
- Geoffrey Collins (1931) : G. A. K. Collins (Sussex)
- George Collins (1919–1925/26) : G. C. Collins (Kent). Tours: West Indies (1925/26).
- Joseph Comber (1934–1948) : J. T. H. Comber (Cambridge University)
- **Denis Compton** (1936–1964) : D. C. S. Compton (Middlesex). Tours: Australia & New Zealand (1946/47); South Africa (1948/49); Australia & New Zealand (1950/51); West Indies (1953/54); Australia & New Zealand (1954/55); South Africa (1956/57).
- **Bill Copson** (1936/37) : W. H. Copson (Derbyshire). Tours: Australia & New Zealand (1936/37).
- Tich Cornford (1929/30) : W. L. Cornford (Sussex). Tours: Australia & New Zealand (1929/30).
- Reginald Covill (1930–1935) : R. J. Covill (Cambridgeshire)
- Fred Covington (1936) : F. E. Covington (Middlesex)
- Aidan Crawley (1929–1947) : A. M. Crawley (Kent)
- Leonard Crawley (1925/26–1939) : L. G. Crawley (Worcestershire, Essex). Tours: West Indies (1925/26).
- Gareth Crwys-Williams (1934) : G. Crwys-Williams (Monmouthshire, Lincolnshire)
- Geoffrey Cuthbertson (1920–1931) : G. B. Cuthbertson (Sussex, Middlesex, Northamptonshire)
- Arthur Cuthbertson (1924) : A. Cuthbertson (Hertfordshire)

== D ==
- Hugh Dales (1925/26–1926) : H. L. Dales (Middlesex). Tours: West Indies (1925/26).
- Jack Davies (1936–1961) : J. G. W. Davies (Kent)
- **Eddie Dawson** (1927/28–1934) : E. W. Dawson (Leicestershire). Tours: South Africa (1927/28); Australia & New Zealand (1929/30).
- **Arthur Dolphin** (1920/21–1926/27) : A. Dolphin (Yorkshire). Tours: Australia (1920/21); India & Ceylon (1926/27).
- **Andy Ducat** (1929/30) : A. Ducat (Surrey). Tours: Australia & New Zealand (1929/30).
- **George Duckworth** (1928/29–1936/37) : G. Duckworth (Lancashire). Tours: Australia (1928/29); South Africa (1930/31); Australia & New Zealand (1932/33); Australia & New Zealand (1936/37).
- **Duleepsinhji** (1924–1931) : Duleepsinhji (Sussex). Tours: Australia & New Zealand (1929/30).
- Alec Douglas-Home (1926/27) : Lord Dunglass (Middlesex). Tours: South America (1926/27).
- **Jack Durston** (1920–1929) : F. J. Durston (Middlesex)

== E ==
- Guy Earle (1923–1929/30) : G. F. Earle (Surrey, Somerset). Tours: India & Ceylon (1926/27); Australia & New Zealand (1929/30).
- Peter Eckersley (1926/27–1936) : P. T. Eckersley (MCC). Tours: India & Ceylon (1926/27).
- **Bill Edrich** (1934–1958) : W. J. Edrich (Middlesex). Tours: South Africa (1938/39); Australia & New Zealand (1946/47); Australia & New Zealand (1954/55).
- **Harry Elliott** (1927/28–1933/34) : H. Elliott (Derbyshire). Tours: South Africa (1927/28); India & Ceylon (1933/34).
- Tommy Enthoven (1927–1948) : H. J. Enthoven (Middlesex)
- Noel Evans (1934) : E. N. Evans (Oxford University)
- Charles Evan-Thomas (1929) : C. M. Evan-Thomas (MCC)

== F ==
- **Arthur Fagg** (1936/37) : A. E. Fagg (Kent). Tours: Australia & New Zealand (1936/37).
- Colin Fairservice (1934–1936) : C. Fairservice (Kent, Middlesex)
- **Ken Farnes** (1934/35–1938/39) : K. Farnes (Essex). Tours: West Indies (1934/35); Australia & New Zealand (1936/37); South Africa (1938/39).
- **Bill Farrimond** (1930/31–1934/35) : W. Farrimond (Lancashire). Tours: South Africa (1930/31); West Indies (1934/35).
- **Percy Fender** (1920–1936) : P. G. H. Fender (Surrey). Tours: Australia (1920/21); South Africa (1922/23).
- George Fenner (1928–1929) : G. D. Fenner (Kent)
- Frank Field (1932) : F. Field (Worcestershire)
- **Laurie Fishlock** (1936/37–1946/47) : L. B. Fishlock (Surrey). Tours: Australia & New Zealand (1936/37); Australia & New Zealand (1946/47).
- Neville Ford (1932) : N. M. Ford (Derbyshire)
- Maurice Foster (1924–1936) : M. K. Foster (Worcestershire)
- Archie Fowler (1924–1925) : A. J. B. Fowler (Middlesex)
- Patrick Fraser (1925–1927) : P. S. Fraser (Scotland)
- **Tich Freeman** (1922/23–1928/29) : A. P. Freeman (Kent). Tours: Australia & New Zealand (1922/23); Australia (1924/25); South Africa (1927/28); Australia (1928/29).
- Edward French (1922–1936) : E. G. F. French (Devon)

== G ==
- Monty Garland-Wells (1934–1938) : H. M. Garland-Wells (Surrey)
- **George Geary** (1926/27–1928/29) : G. Geary (Leicestershire). Tours: India & Ceylon (1926/27); South Africa (1927/28); Australia (1928/29).
- **Paul Gibb** (1938/39–1956) : P. A. Gibb (Yorkshire, Essex). Tours: South Africa (1938/39); Australia & New Zealand (1946/47).
- Clement Gibson (1922/23–1939) : C. H. Gibson (Sussex). Tours: Australia & New Zealand (1922/23).
- Charles Gillett (1920) : C. R. Gillett (MCC)
- **Arthur Gilligan** (1922/23–1932) : A. E. R. Gilligan (Sussex). Tours: South Africa (1922/23); Australia (1924/25); India & Ceylon (1926/27).
- Frank Gilligan (1922–1935) : F. W. Gilligan (Essex)
- **Harold Gilligan** (1926–1929/30) : A. H. H. Gilligan (Sussex). Tours: Australia & New Zealand (1929/30).
- **Tom Goddard** (1930/31–1938/39) : T. W. J. Goddard (Gloucestershire). Tours: South Africa (1930/31); South Africa (1938/39).
- Cecil Graves (1920) : C. G. Graves (Berkshire)
- Laurie Gray (1936–1950) : L. H. Gray (Middlesex)
- Leonard Green (1927) : L. Green (Lancashire)
- Michael Green (1927–1930) : M. A. Green (Gloucestershire, Essex)
- Bob Gregory (1933/34) : R. J. Gregory (Surrey). Tours: India & Ceylon (1933/34).
- Bill Greswell (1925–1930) : W. T. Greswell (Somerset)
- Billy Griffith (1935/36–1953) : S. C. Griffith (Sussex). Tours: Australia & New Zealand (1935/36); West Indies (1947/48); South Africa (1948/49).
- James Grimshaw (1936) : J. W. T. Grimshaw (Kent)
- John Guise (1923–1932) : J. L. Guise (Middlesex)

== H ==
- Anthony Hadingham (1933) : A. W. G. Hadingham (Surrey)
- **Wally Hammond** (1925/26–1950) : W. R. Hammond (Gloucestershire). Tours: West Indies (1925/26); South Africa (1927/28); Australia (1928/29); South Africa (1930/31); Australia & New Zealand (1932/33); West Indies (1934/35); Australia & New Zealand (1936/37); South Africa (1938/39); Australia & New Zealand (1946/47).
- Leslie Hancock (1926) : L. F. Hancock (MCC)
- William Harbord (1934/35) : W. E. Harbord (Yorkshire). Tours: West Indies (1934/35).
- **Joe Hardstaff Jr.** (1935/36–1947/48) : J. Hardstaff junior (Nottinghamshire). Tours: Australia & New Zealand (1935/36); Australia & New Zealand (1936/37); Australia & New Zealand (1946/47); West Indies (1947/48).
- Gerald Harrison (1919) : G. C. Harrison (Hampshire)
- George Hart (1926–1937) : G. E. Hart (Middlesex)
- Shearman Haslip (1919–1920) : S. M. Haslip (Middlesex)
- Wyndham Hazelton (1930) : E. W. Hazelton (Essex)
- Alan Hilder (1930) : A. L. Hilder (Kent)
- Anthony Hill (1928) : A. E. L. Hill (Hampshire)
- Denys Hill (1929) : D. V. Hill (Worcestershire)
- Mervyn Hill (1926/27) : M. L. Hill (Somerset). Tours: India & Ceylon (1926/27).
- Richard Hill (1924) : R. H. Hill (Middlesex)
- Charles Hill-Wood (1928) : C. K. H. Hill-Wood (Derbyshire)
- Denis Hill-Wood (1928) : D. J. C. H. Hill-Wood (Derbyshire)
- Wilfred Hill-Wood (1922/23–1939) : W. W. H. Hill-Wood (Derbyshire). Tours: Australia & New Zealand (1922/23).
- Aubrey Hodges (1936) : A. D. Hodges (MCC)
- **Eric Hollies** (1934/35–1950/51) : W. E. Hollies (Warwickshire). Tours: West Indies (1934/35); Australia & New Zealand (1950/51).
- Frank Hollins (1927) : F. H. Hollins (Lancashire)
- **Errol Holmes** (1928–1951) : E. R. T. Holmes (Surrey). Tours: West Indies (1934/35); Australia & New Zealand (1935/36).
- Jack Holmes (1934–1938/39) : A. J. Holmes (Sussex). Tours: South Africa (1938/39).
- **Percy Holmes** (1925/26–1927/28) : P. Holmes (Yorkshire). Tours: West Indies (1925/26); South Africa (1927/28).
- Alexander Hosie (1925–1938) : A. L. Hosie (Hampshire)
- **Harry Howell** (1920/21–1924/25) : H. Howell (Warwickshire). Tours: Australia (1920/21); Australia (1924/25).
- Miles Howell (1921–1922) : M. Howell (Surrey)
- Bernard Howlett (1931) : B. Howlett (Kent)
- Reginald Hudson (1933–1935) : R. E. H. Hudson (Devon)
- Joe Hulme (1933) : J. H. A. Hulme (Middlesex)
- John Human (1933–1938) : J. H. Human (Middlesex). Tours: India & Ceylon (1933/34); Australia & New Zealand (1935/36).
- Roger Human (1934) : R. H. C. Human (Worcestershire)
- **Len Hutton** (1938/39–1960) : L. Hutton (Yorkshire). Tours: South Africa (1938/39); Australia & New Zealand (1946/47); West Indies (1947/48); South Africa (1948/49); Australia & New Zealand (1950/51); West Indies (1953/54); Australia & New Zealand (1954/55).
- James Hyndson (1924–1926) : J. G. W. Hyndson (Surrey)

== I ==
- **Jack Iddon** (1934/35) : J. Iddon (Lancashire). Tours: West Indies (1934/35).
- Reggie Ingle (1927–1933) : R. A. Ingle (Somerset)
- Philip Irwin (1924) : P. H. Irwin (Cornwall)
- Lionel Isherwood (1923–1926/27) : L. C. R. Isherwood (Hampshire, Sussex). Tours: South America (1926/27).

== J ==
- Guy Jackson (1926/27–1929) : G. R. Jackson (Derbyshire). Tours: South America (1926/27).
- **Jahangir Khan** (1937–1939) : M. Jahangir Khan (Northern India, Southern Punjab)
- Tom Jameson (1919–1930) : T. O. Jameson (Hampshire, Ireland). Tours: West Indies (1925/26); South America (1926/27).
- **Douglas Jardine** (1925–1933/34) : D. R. Jardine (Surrey). Tours: Australia (1928/29); Australia & New Zealand (1932/33); India & Ceylon (1933/34).
- Alfred Jeacocke (1930–1933) : A. Jeacocke (Surrey)
- Gilbert Jessop (1929) : G. L. O. Jessop (Hampshire)
- Neville Jessopp (1919) : N. A. Jessopp (Norfolk)
- Maurice Jewell (1926/27) : M. F. S. Jewell (Worcestershire). Tours: South America (1926/27).
- Con Johnstone (1929–1939) : C. P. Johnstone (Madras, Kent)
- Arthur Judd (1935) : A. K. Judd (Hampshire)
- **Vallance Jupp** (1922/23–1933) : V. W. C. Jupp (Sussex, Northamptonshire). Tours: South Africa (1922/23).

== K ==
- George Kemp-Welch (1932–1934) : G. D. Kemp-Welch (Warwickshire)
- **Alec Kennedy** (1919–1934) : A. S. Kennedy (Hampshire). Tours: South Africa (1922/23).
- Humphrey Kent (1927) : H. N. Kent (Middlesex)
- **Tom Killick** (1934) : E. T. Killick (Middlesex)
- **Roy Kilner** (1924/25–1925/26) : R. Kilner (Yorkshire). Tours: Australia (1924/25); West Indies (1925/26).
- Patrick Kingsley (1931) : P. G. T. Kingsley (Oxford University)
- **Donald Knight** (1921–1925) : D. J. Knight (Surrey)
- Charles Knott (1928) : C. H. Knott (Hampshire)

== L ==
- **James Langridge** (1933/34–1946/47) : J. Langridge (Sussex). Tours: India & Ceylon (1933/34); Australia & New Zealand (1935/36); Australia & New Zealand (1946/47).
- **Harold Larwood** (1928/29–1932/33) : H. Larwood (Nottinghamshire). Tours: Australia (1928/29); Australia & New Zealand (1932/33).
- Roger Latham (1920) : R. D. Latham (MCC)
- Anthony Lawrence (1933) : A. S. Lawrence (Cambridge University)
- Philip Le Gros (1921–1922) : P. W. le Gros (Buckinghamshire)
- Frank Lee (1925) : F. S. Lee (Somerset)
- **Geoffrey Legge** (1927/28–1929/30) : G. B. Legge (Kent). Tours: South Africa (1927/28); Australia & New Zealand (1929/30).
- **Hopper Levett** (1933/34–1946) : W. H. V. Levett (Kent). Tours: India & Ceylon (1933/34).
- **Maurice Leyland** (1926/27–1936/37) : M. Leyland (Yorkshire). Tours: India & Ceylon (1926/27); Australia (1928/29); South Africa (1930/31); Australia & New Zealand (1932/33); West Indies (1934/35); Australia & New Zealand (1936/37).
- Hubert Lindop (1936) : H. H. Lindop (Staffordshire)
- Gerald Livock (1933) : G. E. Livock (Middlesex)
- Tom Longfield (1936) : T. C. Longfield (Kent)
- Henry Longman (1920) : H. K. Longman (Middlesex, Surrey)
- Bunty Longrigg (1930) : E. F. Longrigg (Somerset)
- George Louden (1924) : G. M. Louden (Essex)
- Geoffrey Lowndes (1928–1934) : W. G. L. F. Lowndes (Hampshire)
- **Tom Lowry** (1922/23) : T. C. Lowry (Auckland, Somerset, Wellington). Tours: Australia & New Zealand (1922/23).
- Bev Lyon (1928–1935) : B. H. Lyon (Gloucestershire)
- Dar Lyon (1927–1930) : M. D. Lyon (Somerset)
- Charles Lyttelton, 10th Viscount Cobham (1935–1935/36) : C. J. Lyttelton (Worcestershire). Tours: Australia & New Zealand (1935/36).

== M ==
- **George Macaulay** (1922/23) : G. G. Macaulay (Yorkshire). Tours: South Africa (1922/23).
- **Jack MacBryan** (1919–1936) : J. C. W. MacBryan (Somerset)
- John MacLean (1922/23–1924) : J. F. MacLean (Gloucestershire, Worcestershire). Tours: Australia & New Zealand (1922/23).
- John Mahaffy (1934) : J. P. Mahaffy
- **Harry Makepeace** (1920/21) : J. W. H. Makepeace (Lancashire). Tours: Australia (1920/21).
- **Frank Mann** (1919–1931) : F. T. Mann (Middlesex). Tours: South Africa (1922/23).
- **Charles Marriott** (1933/34–1934) : C. S. Marriott (Lancashire, Kent). Tours: India & Ceylon (1933/34).
- Sidney Martin (1929–1930) : S. H. Martin (Natal, Worcestershire)
- Cecil Maxwell (1938–1939) : C. R. N. Maxwell (Nottinghamshire, Middlesex, Worcestershire)
- Basil Melle (1919) : B. G. V. Melle (Western Province, Hampshire)
- **Alan Melville** (1935) : A. Melville (Natal, Sussex, Transvaal)
- Jack Mercer (1926/27) : J. Mercer (Sussex, Glamorgan). Tours: India & Ceylon (1926/27).
- Jack Meyer (1929–1950) : R. J. O. Meyer (Somerset)
- Harold Miles (1926/27) : H. P. Miles (Devon). Tours: South America (1926/27).
- **Arthur Mitchell** (1933/34) : A. Mitchell (Yorkshire). Tours: India & Ceylon (1933/34).
- **Tommy Mitchell** (1932/33) : T. B. Mitchell (Derbyshire). Tours: Australia & New Zealand (1932/33).
- Thomas Mitchell (1928–1932) : T. F. Mitchell (Kent)
- **Mandy Mitchell-Innes** (1935/36–1946) : N. S. Mitchell-Innes (Somerset). Tours: Australia & New Zealand (1935/36).
- Norman Moffat (1922–1926) : N. J. D. Moffat (Middlesex)
- Dick Moore (1936–1937) : R. H. Moore (Hampshire)
- **Denys Morkel** (1934) : D. P. B. Morkel (Western Province)
- John Stanton Fleming Morrison (1921–1922) : J. S. F. Morrison (Somerset)
- Len Muncer (1935–1957) : B. L. Muncer (Middlesex, Glamorgan)

== N ==
- Robert Nelson (1938) : R. P. Nelson (Middlesex, Northamptonshire)
- John Neve (1936) : J. T. Neve (MCC)
- William Nevell (1938) : W. T. Nevell (Middlesex, Surrey, Northamptonshire)
- George Newman (1928–1930) : G. C. Newman (Middlesex)
- Jack Newman (1922–1930) : J. A. Newman (Hampshire)
- **Stan Nichols** (1929/30–1933/34) : M. S. Nichols (Essex). Tours: Australia & New Zealand (1929/30); India & Ceylon (1933/34).
- Joe North (1923–1925) : E. J. North (Middlesex)

== O ==
- **Jack O'Connor** (1929/30) : J. O'Connor (Essex). Tours: West Indies (1929/30).
- Peter Oldfield (1934) : P. C. Oldfield (Oxford University)
- Berkeley Ormerod (1927) : C. B. Ormerod (MCC)
- **Tuppy Owen-Smith** (1937) : H. G. O. Owen-Smith (Western Province)

== P ==
- **George Paine** (1934/35) : G. A. E. Paine (Warwickshire). Tours: West Indies (1934/35).
- Harold Palmer (1936) : H. J. Palmer (Essex)
- Cecil Paris (1939) : C. G. A. Paris (Hampshire)
- **Cec Parkin** (1920/21) : C. H. Parkin (Lancashire). Tours: Australia (1920/21).
- **Jim Parks** (1935/36) : J. H. Parks (Sussex). Tours: Australia & New Zealand (1935/36).
- Jack Parsons (1926/27–1936) : J. H. Parsons (Warwickshire). Tours: India & Ceylon (1926/27).
- Iftikhar Ali Khan Pataudi (1930–1933) : Nawab of Pataudi (Worcestershire). Tours: Australia & New Zealand (1932/33).
- John Pawle (1938–1946) : J. H. Pawle (Essex)
- **Eddie Paynter** (1932/33–1938/39) : E. Paynter (Lancashire). Tours: Australia & New Zealand (1932/33); South Africa (1938/39).
- Alec Pearce (1932–1946) : T. A. Pearce (Kent)
- Tom Pearce (1935–1952) : T. N. Pearce (Essex)
- William Peare (1936) : W. G. Peare (Warwickshire)
- Vyvyan Pearse (1925–1926) : G. V. Pearse (Natal, Oxford University)
- **Ian Peebles** (1927/28–1937) : I. A. R. Peebles (Middlesex). Tours: South Africa (1927/28); South Africa (1930/31).
- **Reg Perks** (1938/39–1953) : R. T. D. Perks (Worcestershire). Tours: South Africa (1938/39).
- Hal Pickthall (1928–1935) : H. Pickthall (Monmouthshire)
- Thomas Pilkington (1926/27) : T. A. Pilkington. Tours: South America (1926/27).
- Reginald Popham (1919) : R. F. Popham (Norfolk)
- Adam Powell (1935/36–1950) : A. G. Powell (Essex). Tours: Australia & New Zealand (1935/36).
- James Powell (1928–1931) : J. A. Powell (Middlesex)
- **Fred Price** (1929–1938) : W. F. F. Price (Middlesex). Tours: West Indies (1929/30).
- Frank Putner (1938) : F. W. Putner (Middlesex)

== R ==
- Alan Ratcliffe (1931–1939) : A. Ratcliffe (Surrey)
- Donald Ray (1931) : D. W. G. Ray (MCC)
- **Hopper Read** (1935–1948) : H. D. Read (Essex). Tours: Australia & New Zealand (1935/36).
- Norman Riches (1925–1931) : N. V. H. Riches (Glamorgan)
- Edward Allen Roberts (1931–1939) : E. A. Roberts (Hertfordshire)
- Desmond Roberts (1921–1936) : D. Roberts (Surrey)
- **Jack Robertson** (1938–1956) : J. D. B. Robertson (Middlesex). Tours: West Indies (1947/48); India, Pakistan & Ceylon (1951/52).
- R. C. Robertson-Glasgow (1927–1933) : R. C. Robertson-Glasgow (Somerset)
- **Walter Robins** (1931–1958) : R. W. V. Robins (Middlesex). Tours: Australia & New Zealand (1936/37); Canada (1951).
- Lancelot Robinson (1934) : L. C. D. Robinson (MCC)
- Francis Rogers (1929) : F. G. Rogers (Gloucestershire)
- **Fred Root** (1925/26) : C. F. Root (Derbyshire, Worcestershire). Tours: West Indies (1925/26).
- **Jack Russell** (1920–1928) : C. A. G. Russell (Essex). Tours: Australia (1920/21); South Africa (1922/23).
- Ronald Rutter (1932–1933) : R. H. Rutter (Buckinghamshire)

== S ==
- **Andy Sandham** (1922/23–1930/31) : A. Sandham (Surrey). Tours: South Africa (1922/23); Australia (1924/25); India & Ceylon (1926/27); West Indies (1929/30); South Africa (1930/31).
- Arthur Scott (1929) : A. P. Scott (MCC)
- Kenneth Sellar (1935) : K. A. Sellar (MCC)
- **Jim Sims** (1929–1953) : J. M. Sims (Middlesex). Tours: Australia & New Zealand (1935/36); Australia & New Zealand (1936/37).
- **Reg Sinfield** (1921–1923) : R. A. Sinfield (Gloucestershire)
- Bhupinder Singh of Patiala (1926/27) : Bhupinder Singh (Patiala). Tours: India & Ceylon (1926/27).
- **Denis Smith** (1935/36) : D. Smith (Derbyshire). Tours: Australia & New Zealand (1935/36).
- **Jim Smith** (1931–1939) : C. I. J. Smith (Middlesex). Tours: West Indies (1934/35).
- **R. T. Stanyforth** (1923–1933) : R. T. Stanyforth (MCC). Tours: South America (1926/27); South Africa (1927/28); West Indies (1929/30).
- **Sam Staples** (1927/28) : S. J. Staples (Nottinghamshire). Tours: South Africa (1927/28).
- John Stephenson (1935–1939) : J. W. A. Stephenson (Essex)
- **Greville Stevens** (1920–1933) : G. T. S. Stevens (Middlesex). Tours: South Africa (1922/23); South Africa (1927/28); West Indies (1929/30).
- **George Street** (1922/23) : G. B. Street (Sussex). Tours: South Africa (1922/23).
- **Herbert Sutcliffe** (1924/25–1932/33) : H. Sutcliffe (Yorkshire). Tours: Australia (1924/25); South Africa (1927/28); Australia (1928/29); Australia & New Zealand (1932/33).
- Henry Swan (1922/23) : H. D. Swan (MCC). Tours: Australia & New Zealand (1922/23).
- Edward Sweetland (1928–1933) : E. H. Sweetland (Middlesex)

== T ==
- **Maurice Tate** (1924/25–1932/33) : M. W. Tate (Sussex). Tours: Australia (1924/25); India & Ceylon (1926/27); Australia (1928/29); South Africa (1930/31); Australia & New Zealand (1932/33).
- **Herbie Taylor** (1932) : H. W. Taylor (Natal)
- Mark Tindall (1936–1937) : M. Tindall (Middlesex)
- Charles Titchmarsh (1920–1928) : C. H. Titchmarsh (Hertfordshire). Tours: Australia & New Zealand (1922/23).
- David Townsend (1934/35–1946) : D. C. H. Townsend (Durham). Tours: West Indies (1934/35).
- Leslie Townsend (1929/30–1933/34) : L. F. Townsend (Derbyshire). Tours: West Indies (1929/30); India & Ceylon (1933/34).
- Stanley Toyne (1928) : S. M. Toyne (Hampshire)
- Erroll Tremlett (1929–1934) : E. A. E. Tremlett (MCC)
- **Maurice Turnbull** (1929/30–1934) : M. J. L. Turnbull (Glamorgan). Tours: Australia & New Zealand (1929/30); South Africa (1930/31).
- **Dick Tyldesley** (1924/25) : R. K. Tyldesley (Lancashire). Tours: Australia (1924/25).
- **Ernest Tyldesley** (1927/28–1928/29) : G. E. Tyldesley (Lancashire). Tours: South Africa (1927/28); Australia (1928/29).
- Harry Tyldesley (1922/23) : H. Tyldesley (Lancashire). Tours: Australia & New Zealand (1922/23).

== V ==
- **Bryan Valentine** (1932–1948) : B. H. Valentine (Kent). Tours: India & Ceylon (1933/34); South Africa (1938/39).
- Paul van der Gucht (1939) : P. I. van der Gucht (Bengal)
- **Hedley Verity** (1932/33–1938/39) : H. Verity (Yorkshire). Tours: Australia & New Zealand (1932/33); India & Ceylon (1933/34); Australia & New Zealand (1936/37); South Africa (1938/39).
- **Bill Voce** (1929/30–1946/47) : W. Voce (Nottinghamshire). Tours: West Indies (1929/30); South Africa (1930/31); Australia & New Zealand (1932/33); Australia & New Zealand (1936/37); Australia & New Zealand (1946/47).

== W ==
- **Abe Waddington** (1920/21) : A. Waddington (Yorkshire). Tours: Australia (1920/21).
- Bernard Waddy (1934–1936) : B. B. Waddy (Oxford University)
- Tom Wade (1936/37) : T. H. Wade (Essex). Tours: Australia & New Zealand (1936/37).
- Leslie Waghorn (1928) : L. A. Waghorn (Sussex)
- David Walker (1936) : D. F. Walker (Oxford University)
- **Cyril Walters** (1933/34–1935) : C. F. Walters (Worcestershire). Tours: India & Ceylon (1933/34).
- **Cyril Washbrook** (1946/47–1964) : C. Washbrook (Lancashire). Tours: Australia & New Zealand (1946/47); South Africa (1948/49); Australia & New Zealand (1950/51).
- William Richard Watkins (1936–1947) : W. R. Watkins (Middlesex)
- Frank Watson (1925/26) : F. B. Watson (Lancashire). Tours: West Indies (1925/26).
- William Webster (1935–1939) : W. H. Webster (Middlesex)
- Thomas Welch (1931) : T. B. G. Welch (Northamptonshire)
- Jack Wheatley (1929) : J. B. Wheatley (Middlesex)
- **Jack White** (1926/27–1934) : J. C. White (Somerset). Tours: South America (1926/27); Australia (1928/29); South Africa (1930/31).
- **William Whysall** (1924/25) : W. W. Whysall (Nottinghamshire). Tours: Australia (1924/25).
- William Wignall (1932–1938) : W. H. Wignall (Middlesex)
- Denys Wilcox (1936–1947) : D. R. Wilcox (Essex)
- **Len Wilkinson** (1938/39) : L. L. Wilkinson (Lancashire). Tours: South Africa (1938/39).
- Edward Williams (1933) : E. S. B. Williams (MCC)
- Geoffrey Wilson (1922/23) : G. Wilson (Yorkshire). Tours: Australia & New Zealand (1922/23).
- Roger Winlaw (1935–1936) : R. D. K. Winlaw (Bedfordshire)
- **George Wood** (1924–1932) : G. E. C. Wood (Kent)
- **Stan Worthington** (1929/30–1936/37) : T. S. Worthington (Derbyshire). Tours: Australia & New Zealand (1929/30); Australia & New Zealand (1936/37).
- **Doug Wright** (1938/39–1956) : D. V. P. Wright (Kent). Tours: South Africa (1938/39); Australia & New Zealand (1946/47); South Africa (1948/49); Australia & New Zealand (1950/51).
- Douglas Wright (1928) : D. A. Wright (MCC)
- **Bob Wyatt** (1926/27–1954) : R. E. S. Wyatt (Warwickshire). Tours: India & Ceylon (1926/27); South Africa (1927/28); West Indies (1929/30); South Africa (1930/31); Australia & New Zealand (1932/33); West Indies (1934/35); Australia & New Zealand (1936/37).

== Y ==
- **Norman Yardley** (1938/39–1952) : N. W. D. Yardley (Yorkshire). Tours: South Africa (1938/39); Australia & New Zealand (1946/47).
- Ronald Yeldham (1926/27) : R. E. S. Yeldham (MCC). Tours: India & Ceylon (1926/27).

== See also ==
- Lists of Marylebone Cricket Club players
