= Arthur Scott =

Arthur Scott may refer to:

- Arthur E. Scott (1917–1976), American photo-historian
- Arthur Scott (footballer) (1878–1957), Australian rules footballer
- Arthur Scott (rower) (1887–1966), Australian Olympic rower
- Arthur Scott (cricketer, born 1883) (1883–1968), English cricketer and Royal Navy officer
- Arthur Scott (cricketer, born 1885) (1885—1933), English cricketer and businessman
- Sir Arthur Scott of the Bateman baronets

== See also ==
- Scott (surname)
