= Frank Naumann =

English cricketer

Frank Charles Gordon Naumann MC (9 April 1892 – 30 October 1947) was an English first-class cricketer active 1912–26 who played for Surrey and Oxford University. He was born in Lewisham; died in Cranleigh.

In the 1919 University Match, Frank Naumann played for Oxford and his brother John was in the Cambridge team. Also in the Oxford team was Frank Gilligan whose brother Arthur was playing for Cambridge. The Times called this "a case without parallel."

He awarded an MC in 1917 for his service a temporary lieutenant in the Royal Horse Artillery.
