= Marylebone Cricket Club in Australia in 1922–23 =

International cricket tour

An English team raised by Marylebone Cricket Club (MCC) toured Australia in November 1922 and March 1923 on their way to and from a longer tour of New Zealand. After a short stopover in Ceylon, where a single minor match was played, they played four first-class matches against Australian state teams in November, and three on the way back from New Zealand in March.

== The team ==
The fourteen players, with their ages at the start of the tour in November 1922, were:

- Archie MacLaren (captain, 50)
- John Hartley (vice-captain, 47)
- David Brand (20)
- Freddie Calthorpe (30)
- Percy Chapman (22)
- Tich Freeman (34)
- Clement Gibson (22)
- Wilfred Hill-Wood (21)
- Tom Lowry (24)
- John MacLean (21)
- Charles Titchmarsh (41)
- Harry Tyldesley (29)
- Alexander Wilkinson (29)
- Geoffrey Wilson (27)

Robert St Leger Fowler was invited but was unable to tour and was replaced by Brand. The manager was Henry Swan, who also played in the match against Western Australia. Freeman and Tyldesley were the only professionals.

MacLaren and Hartley had played Test cricket for England before World War I. Calthorpe and Chapman went on to captain the England Test team, Lowry to be the first Test captain of New Zealand, and Freeman also played Tests for England.

The doctor and former Australian Test player Roland Pope accompanied the team throughout Australia and New Zealand at his own expense, serving as honorary physician.

== Leading players ==
Chapman was the leading scorer in the entire Australian first-class season. He played in all seven matches and scored 782 runs at an average of 65.16. Of the other main MCC batsmen, Wilson scored 417 runs at 41.70, Titchmarsh 337 at 30.63, Calthorpe 316 at 28.72 and Hill-Wood 304 at 33.77. Chapman hit two centuries, and Hill-Wood, Calthorpe and Wilson one each.

Freeman was the leading wicket-taker for MCC, with 30 at an average of 32.96. Gibson took 21 at 43.47, and the only other bowler to take at least 10 was Tyldesley, with 12 at 26.58.
