= Jessopp =

Jessopp is a surname. Notable people with the surname include:

- Anne Jessopp (born 1963), chief executive of Royal Mint
- Augustus Jessopp (1823–1914), English cleric and writer
- Neville Jessopp (1898–1977), English cricketer

== See also ==
- Jessop
