= Charles Naumann =

English cricketer and British Army officer (1897 – 1946)

Personal information
- Full name: Charles Cecil Naumann
- Born: 27 August 1897; Croydon, Surrey, England
- Died: 16 December 1946 (aged 49); St Pancras, London, England
- Batting: Right-handed
- Relatives: Frank Naumann (brother); John Naumann (brother)

Domestic team information
- Years: Team
- 1919: Cambridge University

Career statistics
Competition	First-class
Matches	1
Runs scored	5
Batting average	5.00
100s/50s	–/–
Top score	5
Catches/stumpings	–/–
- Source: Cricinfo, 1 January 2022

Charles Cecil Naumann MC (27 August 1897 – 16 December 1946) was an English first-class cricketer, British Army officer and businessman.

The son of the naturalised Prussian merchant Frank Gustavus Naumann, he was born at Croydon in August 1897 and was educated at Malvern College. By the time Naumann had completed his education at Malvern, the First World War had begun. From Malvern he was commissioned as a second lieutenant in September 1916, entering into the Rifle Brigade. He was promoted to lieutenant in March 1918, before being made an acting captain and adjutant in October 1918. He ceased to hold these appointments in February 1919. Naumann was decorated with the Military Cross in April 1919, for conspicuous gallantry on 1 November 1918, while attacking the German occupied village of Presseau. During the attack, Naumann repeatedly went forward to gain information under heavy fire, until he found an artillery forward observation officer. He resigned his commission following the end of the war, retaining the rank of lieutenant. Naumann's father was killed during the war in the sinking of the RMS Lusitania in 1915.

After the war, Naumann resumed his education by going up to Pembroke College, Cambridge. While studying at Cambridge, he made a single appearance in first-class cricket for Cambridge University Cricket Club against the Marylebone Cricket Club at Lord's in 1919. In a match heavily affected by rain, Naumann opened the batting in Cambridge's only innings and was the only Cambridge batsman to be dismissed, having scored 5 runs before he was bowled by Arthur Newman. He went into business after graduating from Cambridge, travelling to Brazil on business in 1925. He was a figure in Brazilian cricket around this time, playing minor matches for the British expat dominated Brazil national cricket team.

He was later called upon for military service in the Second World War, when he was appointed a second lieutenant on the General List in July 1941 and was assigned to the Rifle Brigade in January 1942, retaining his First World War rank of lieutenant. He resigned his commission in May 1945, on account of disability, and was granted the honorary rank of major. Naumann died at St Pancras in December 1946. His brother's, Frank and John, were also first-class cricketers.
