= Arthur Cuthbertson =

Arthur Cuthbertson may refer to:

- Arthur Cuthbertson (ice hockey) (1888–1925), Australian ice hockey player
- Arthur Cuthbertson (cricketer) (1901–1979), English first-class cricketer
