= Thomas Burchell (cricketer) =

English cricketer

Thomas James Burchell (26 April 1875 – 16 February 1951) was an English cricketer. He was a wicket-keeper who played first-class cricket for Sussex. He was born in Hove and died in Brighton.

Burchell made his first-class debut against Cambridge University in 1905. He was trapped lbw in the first innings, and finished not out in the second.

Though he appeared once for the Second XI in 1907, Burchell's second and final first-class match came 14 years after his first, once again appearing against Cambridge University. However, Sussex were to lose by a margin of an innings and 245 runs, following centuries in the Cambridge University team from John Morrison, John Naumann, and number eleven batsman and future Test cricketer Arthur Gilligan.
