= Benka =

Benka is a surname. It is, as well, a Swedish female given name. Notable people with the surname include:

- Herbert Benka (1909–1970), British cricketer
- Martin Benka (1888–1971), Slovak painter and illustrator
- Miroslav Benka (born 1956), Serbian screenwriter, actor, director, and designer
