= Putner =

Putner is a surname. Notable people with the surname include:

- Frank Putner (1912–1997), English cricketer
- Paul Putner (born 1966), English comedian and actor
