= Thomas Burchell (disambiguation) =

Thomas Burchell may refer to:

- Thomas Burchell (cricketer) (1875–1951), cricketer
- Thomas Burchell (1799–1846), Jamaican missionary

== See also ==
- Thomas Burchill (1882–1955), American congressman
