= William Wilkinson (cricketer, born 1857) =

Australian-born English cricketer

William Camac Wilkinson (15 September 1857 – 2 February 1946) was an Australian-born cricketer and doctor. He was a first-class cricketer active 1881–99, who played twice for Middlesex. He was a physician in Sydney and later London, England, where he died.

== Early life and education ==
William Camac Wilkinson was born in Sydney, Australia, on 15 September 1857. He was the eldest of seven children of London born barrister and judge William Hattam Wilkinson (15 February 1831 – 25 September 1908) and Elizabeth Sibyl Milligan (20 November 1828 – 7 January 1902) who emigrated to Australia in the year of their marriage, 1852. Wilkinson's three brothers all became solicitors.

He studied in Australia and London, England, becoming a noted physician and lecturer.

== Cricket ==
Wilkinson played four times for the Australian tour of 1878.

He played twice for Middlesex, in 1881 and 1882.

He played in eight first-class matches as a right-handed batsman, scoring 189 runs with a highest score of 52; as a right-arm medium pace bowler, taking eight wickets with a best performance of four for 49.

== Professional life ==
Wilkinson was a physician in Sydney, becoming lecturer in pathology (1884–1901) and then medicine (1901–1910) at the University of Sydney. He moved to London, where he became a Harley Street specialist in 1910. He was a Fellow of the Royal College of Physicians, and a leading specialist in the treatment of tuberculosis.

== Publications ==
- The Role of the City Dispensary in the Crusade Against Consumption. Sydney, W.C. Penfold. 1904
- Treatment of Consumption, Macmillan & Co., 1908
- "Diagnosis and Treatment of Tuberculosis" (Weber-Parkes Prize essay) with additions. London, James Nisbet & Co. 1912

== Personal life and death ==
Wilkinson died on 2 February 1946 in Virginia Water, Surrey, England.

Wilkinson's son Alexander Wilkinson was a decorated soldier and also first-class cricketer.
