= Marylebone Cricket Club in New Zealand in 1922–23 =

International cricket tour

An English team raised by Marylebone Cricket Club (MCC) toured New Zealand from December 1922 to February 1923 and played eight first-class matches including three against the New Zealand national cricket team. MCC also played the main provincial teams including Auckland (twice), Wellington, Canterbury and Otago. The overall tour included a short stopover in Ceylon, where a single minor match was played, and two visits to Australia where a total of seven first-class matches were played.

== The team ==
- Archie MacLaren (captain)
- John Hartley (vice-captain)
- David Brand
- Freddie Calthorpe
- Percy Chapman
- Tich Freeman
- Clement Gibson
- Wilfred Hill-Wood
- Tom Lowry
- John MacLean
- Charles Titchmarsh
- Harry Tyldesley
- Alexander Wilkinson
- Geoffrey Wilson

The manager was Henry Swan, who played in some of the minor matches. Philip Slater and Basil Hill-Wood also played in some of the minor matches in New Zealand. Freeman and Tyldesley were the only professionals. Robert St Leger Fowler was invited but was unable to tour and was replaced by Brand. The doctor and former Australian Test player Roland Pope accompanied the team throughout Australia and New Zealand at his own expense, serving as honorary physician.

== Assessments ==
The tour made a loss of about £2000, a substantial amount at the time. The MCC and the New Zealand authorities shared the financial burden. One of the reasons for the loss was the extravagance of MacLaren, who insisted on having his wife with him throughout, at the tour's expense. Bill Ferguson, who travelled with the team as baggage master, said MacLaren never made "even a token attempt to make the tour pay its way, being content first and foremost with his own requirements – and he had expensive tastes". Ferguson said the MacLarens "frequently went away to Rotorua and such places for holidays", but he observed that their absences did not upset the rest of the team.

== Bibliography ==
- David Kynaston, Archie's Last Stand: M.C.C. in New Zealand 1922-23, Queen Anne Press, London, 1984
- Don Neely & Richard Payne, Men in White: The History of New Zealand International Cricket, 1894–1985, Moa, Auckland, 1986, pp. 61–64
