= Alexander Wilkinson =

British Army officer and English cricketer

- Born: 6 December 1892; Sydney, Australia
- Died: 19 September 1983 (aged 90); Storrington, West Sussex, England
- Military career
- Allegiance: United Kingdom
- Branch: British Army
- Service years: 1913–1947
- Rank: Colonel
- Units: Army Service Corps; Coldstream Guards
- Commands: 14th Battalion, Queen's Royal Regiment (West Surrey); 99 Light Anti-Aircraft Regiment, Royal Artillery
- Conflicts: First World War; Second World War: Battle of Monte Cassino
- Awards: Distinguished Service Order; Military Cross & Bar; George Medal
- Other work: Amateur cricketer

Colonel William Alexander Camac Wilkinson, DSO, MC & Bar, GM (6 December 1892 – 19 September 1983) was a highly decorated British Army officer and English cricketer. Australian born, he served with the British Army in both the First and Second World Wars. After the Second World War he spent some time in Graz, Austria, as Senior Military Government Officer in the occupation forces.

He also had a first-class cricket career lasting 27 years. He was regarded as one of the most consistent batsmen of his day, despite playing much of his career with a damaged right hand. The injury occurred when he was shot during the First World War, and he narrowly avoided having the hand amputated.

== Personal life ==
Born in Sydney on 6 December 1892, he was the son of Middlesex cricketer William Wilkinson, who was at that time in practice as a doctor in the city. With his father's move to Britain, Alexander attended Eton College. He first visited Austria in 1906, beginning a long connection with that country. He attended University College, Oxford, between 1910 and 1914, representing the university at cricket and hurdling. In 1919, he became engaged to the Honorable Muriel French, daughter of Arthur French, 4th Baron de Freyne. He died in Sussex in 1983, aged 90.

== Army career ==
=== First World War and after ===
Wilkinson first joined the British Army as a second lieutenant on the unattached list of the Territorial Force, being commissioned on 18 August 1913. Following the outbreak of the First World War, he was appointed a temporary second lieutenant in the Army Service Corps on 3 November 1914.

On 6 January 1916 he was appointed a probationary Special Reserve second lieutenant in the Coldstream Guards. He was promoted to lieutenant on 21 October 1915, and acting captain on 20 July 1917. He was awarded the Military Cross (MC) on 26 September 1917, and the citation was published on 9 January 1918, reading:

Lt. William Alexander Camac Wilkinson C. Gds., Spec. Res. For conspicuous gallantry and devotion to duty in commanding his company with the utmost fearlessness and ability after his company commander had become a casualty. Having led them in the attack, he walked up and down during consolidation, regardless of the fact that enemy snipers were firing at very close range, urging his men to greater efforts so that they should get quickly under cover. Later in the evening, he made a personal reconnaissance of a strong point, made his dispositions before dark, and subsequently led his company forward and captured it with the greatest dash and gallantry.

Wilkinson was also awarded a Bar to the MC. After the war, he reverted to lieutenant on 4 April 1919. From 17 December 1920 to 3 September 1923 he was assistant superintendent of the school of army physical training. He was promoted to substantive captain on 15 September 1924. On 2 January 1928 he was seconded to act as adjutant of a Territorial Army unit, the Honourable Artillery Company, holding the appointment until his promotion to major on 1 March 1931. He retired on 1 September 1933.

=== Second World War ===
Recalled to the army with the start of the Second World War, Wilkinson was a temporary lieutenant colonel commanding the 14th Battalion, Queen's Royal Regiment (West Surrey) when a number of his men strayed into a minefield. Several were killed, and one injured man could be seen in the middle of the mined area, still moving. Royal Engineers had been sent for to clear the mines, and a doctor who happened to be present gave the opinion that the wounded man was unlikely to survive. Whilst the doctor was talking to the other officer present, Wilkinson entered the minefield, and managed to bring out the wounded man single-handed. For those actions, Wilkinson was awarded the George Medal (GM) on 8 July 1941, as was the Royal Engineer officer, Major Arthur Henry Musgrave Norris, who subsequently cleared the remainder of the minefield, and Regimental Sergeant Major Ernest Joseph Legg (West Surreys) and Lance-Sergeant Harry Fred Hardy (RE), who assisted.

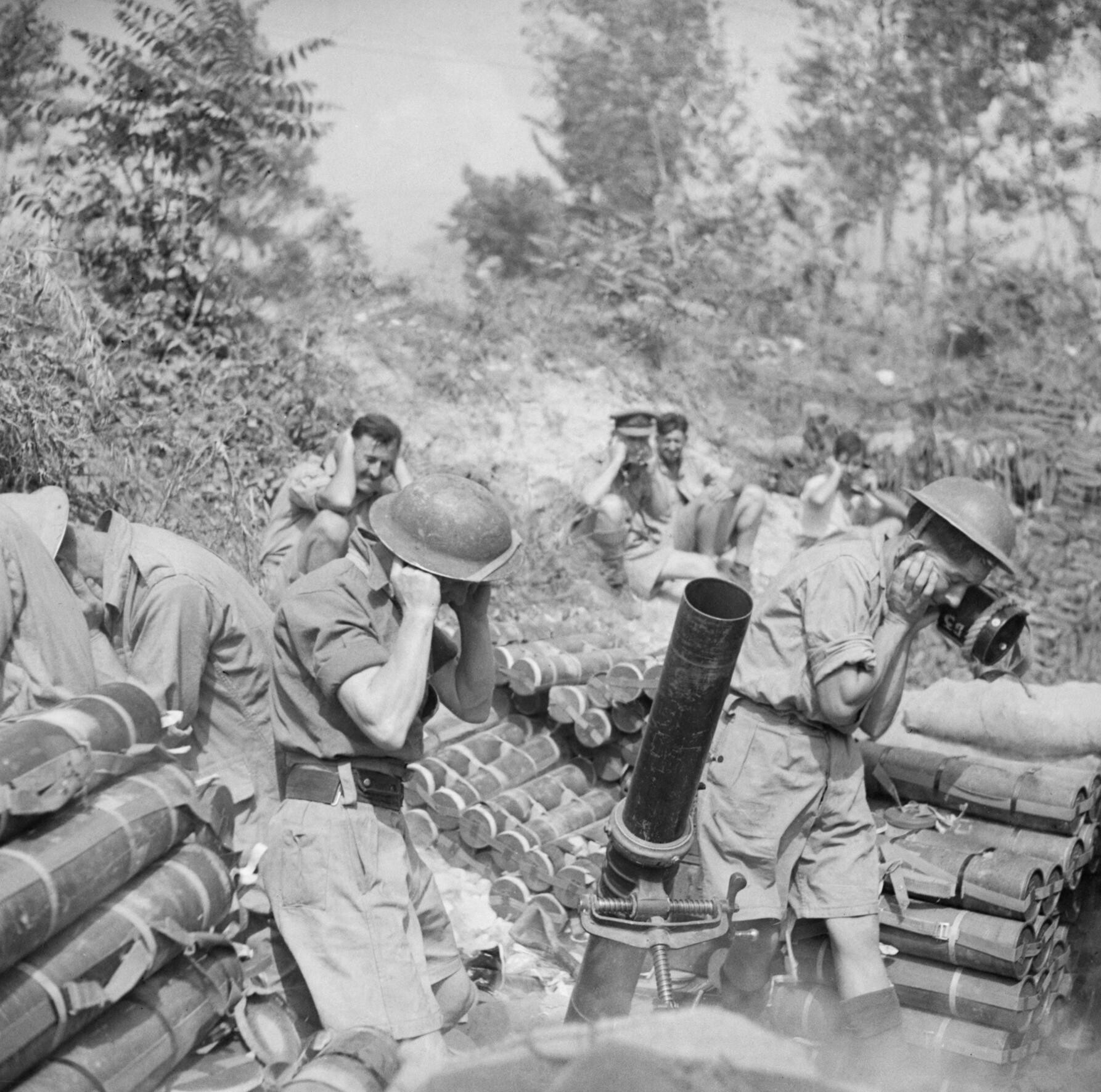
A 4.2-inch mortar of 'S' Troop of the 327th Battery, 99th Light Anti-Aircraft Regiment, Royal Artillery, in action with the mortar for the first time, at Monte Cassino, Italy, 1944.

14th Queen's was converted into 99th Light Anti-Aircraft Regiment, Royal Artillery, on 1 December 1941 and Wilkinson formally transferred to the Royal Artillery on 1 June 1942. For the Allied invasion of Sicily (Operation Husky), 99th LAA Regiment was split up among various 'Beach Bricks' for the assault phase. Wilkinson commanded the anti-aircraft elements of No 34 Beach Brick, consisting of one of his own batteries and one from 100th Heavy Anti-Aircraft Regiment. When it came to the landing on 10 July 1943 No 34 Beach Brick was unlucky: the Landing Craft Infantry carrying the advance party smashed its ramp, came under fire, and veered off course, finally landing the party 4 miles (6.4 km) from its intended beach north of Avola. The party had to work along the coast, close to the enemy, through two minefields, before reaching their allotted area, where the guns were being landed from Landing Craft Tanks. Wilkinson later described the landing to his opposite number of 100th HAA Rgt as 'A very pleasant exercise in Combined Operations with sufficient enemy fire to make it mildly interesting'.

Wilkinson was still commanding 99th Light Anti-Aircraft Regiment when on 13 May 1944, during the final stages of the Battle of Monte Cassino he performed the actions that led to his award of the Distinguished Service Order on 21 September 1944. His regiment had been detailed to make smoke to cover the bridges over the Gari River, early in the day it was reported that there was no smoke covering one particular bridge (codenamed Amazon). Wilkinson took a jeep to investigate the situation for himself, approaching the bridge the trailer from another jeep was found, which contained the equipment for making smoke, which was then loaded into his own jeep. It was later determined that both officers responsible for the bridge had been injured (one killed), and the sergeant had also been killed, and initial supplies of smoke canisters had been exhausted. Wilkinson proceeded to cross the bridge on foot, under mortar and small arms fire, carrying replacement smoke canisters. He managed to begin the re-establishment of the smoke screen, left the one man still there tending the new smoke canisters, and gathered an additional party of men to ensure the screen was maintained.

With the end of hostilities, Wilkinson was appointed to the military government in the British Zone in Austria, based in Graz, from July 1945. He was noted for his broadcasts, in German, on the local radio service, covering the province of Styria, of which Graz is the capital. He continued in this role until his second retirement, on 5 July 1947, when he was granted the honorary rank of colonel. The retirement was ostensibly because he had exceeded the age limit for service, but his obituary in The Times stated that it was due to his disagreement with the official policy of forcible repatriation to Russia.

He made many subsequent visits to the region, and in 1977 was awarded the Grand Gold Medal of Honour by the Styrian provincial government. Shortly before his death, he attended a dinner given in his honour at Goodwood House by the then Landeshauptmann (provincial governor), Dr Joseph Krainer.

== Cricket career ==
=== Early career ===
Alexander Wilkinson
Cricket information
- Batting: Right-handed
- Bowling: Right-arm slow
- Role: Batsman

Domestic team information
- Years: Team
- 1912: HK Foster's XI
- 1913–1914: Oxford University
- 1914–1939: MCC
- 1914–1939: Free Foresters
- 1919–1931: Army
- 1920–1931: Combined Services
- 1923: Gentlemen of England
- 1927: Harlequins
- FC debut: 30 May 1912 HK Foster's XI v Oxford University
- Last FC: 28 June 1939 MCC v Oxford University

Career statistics
Competition	First-class
Matches	89
Runs scored	4785
Batting average	31.48
100s/50s	8/25
Top score	129
Balls bowled	548
Wickets	12
Bowling average	32.08
5 wickets in innings	0
10 wickets in match	0
Best bowling	4/32
Catches/stumpings	49/–
- Source: CricketArchive, 18 May 2008

A right-handed batsman and right-arm slow bowler, Wilkinson played twice for the Sussex second XI in 1910, though he never played for the first team, nor did he play county cricket.

He did, however, have a substantial first-class career, spanning more than a quarter of a century, making his debut for HK Foster's XI against Oxford University during the 1912 English cricket season. He played for the university against Foster's team the following year and played eight first-class matches for the university that year, gaining his blue when he played against Cambridge University at Lord's in July.

Wilkinson played six more first-class matches for the university team in the 1914 season, including a match against the Marylebone Cricket Club (MCC) at Lord's, though he was eventually dropped from the team after having a poor season.

=== Post-war ===
Wilkinson was shot in the right hand during the First World War, and almost had to have it amputated. That left him with little strength in the hand, though he could hold a bat with it. He was also unable to do much fielding on his right side. Despite these handicaps, he continued to play cricket, playing 74 more first-class matches, and he was never considered a liability in the field.

His return to first-class cricket came in June 1919, when he played for the Free Foresters against both university teams. He also played for the MCC against Oxford University, and in July played first-class cricket for the British Army cricket team for the first time, playing against the Royal Navy at Lord's. He followed that with non-first-class matches for the Army against the RAF and for the MCC against Buckinghamshire.

In the 1920 season, he played for the Free Foresters against Oxford University before playing for the Army against both university sides and the Royal Navy. He also made his debut for the Combined Services cricket team that season, playing against the Gentlemen of England at Lord's. During the season he again played a handful of non-first-class matches, for the Old Etonians against the Old Harrovians, for the Army against a Public Schools XI, and for the MCC against a combined Minor Counties team.

The 1921 season saw Wilkinson test himself against international opposition for the first time when he played for the Combined Services against the touring Australians. He also again played for the Free Foresters against Oxford University and for the Army against both universities and the Navy. He played the same three matches for the Army in the 1922 season, though he didn't play for the Free Foresters, and played a first-class match for the Combined Services against Essex, as well as non-first-class matches for the Household Brigade against Eton College and for I Zingari against Winchester College.

That winter he went on an MCC tour of Australia and New Zealand with the MCC. No Test matches were played on the Australian leg of the tour, though three matches were played against New Zealand on that leg. The games were not Test matches, however, because New Zealand had not then gained Test status. They were first-class matches though, and Wilkinson played in all three, so he participated in a total of 11 first-class matches across the two tours.

Back in England, Wilkinson again played for the Army in first-class matches against both universities and the Royal Navy before playing in that year's Gentlemen v Players match at the Oval. The same matches for the Army were repeated in the season and he also played first-class cricket for the Combined Services against South Africa.

The rest of the 1920s was filled with many matches for the Army against the same familiar opponents, though there were exceptions. Wilkinson played for the Harlequins against Oxford University in 1927, for the Army against New Zealand the same year, and for the Free Foresters against Oxford University in 1929. The Army's match against the Royal Air Force was also first-class in 1928 and 1929. In 1927, Wilkinson went on a tour of Egypt with the Free Foresters, playing twice against the Egyptian national side.

In 1930, after playing for the Army against the RAF and the MCC, he played for the MCC against Wales. The following year, he played for the Free Foresters against Oxford University, for the Army against Oxford University and the RAF, and for the Combined Services against New Zealand, before playing his final first-class match for the Army against the MCC in August. He captained the Army team for that match, which was his last first-class game for almost three years.

=== Later career ===
In April 1933, Wilkinson played twice for Egypt against HM Martineau's XI. He captained the team in both matches and scored a century in the second. He resumed his first-class career in May 1934 with a match for the Free Foresters against Oxford University, and over the following five years was a regular for the Free Foresters and the MCC, usually playing first-class matches against the two university teams, though he also played for the MCC against Kent in the 1935 season. His last first-class match was for the MCC against Oxford University in June 1939.

As well as his first-class matches, he also played for the MCC in minor matches. He played twice against Ireland in 1935 and 1937, against a Canadian XI in 1936, and against Scotland in 1939. He continued playing club cricket after World War II and scored a century in his final game, which he reckoned to be his hundredth in all cricket.

=== Statistics ===
In his 89 first-class matches, Wilkinson scored 4785 runs at an average of 31.48. He made eight centuries, his highest score of 129 coming in 1913 for Oxford University against the MCC. He made those runs inside 90 minutes. He took twelve wickets at an average of 32.08, with his best innings bowling figures of 4/32 being for Oxford University against HDG Leveson-Gower's XI in the 1913 English cricket season. All his wickets came that season.

== Golf ==
Wilkinson also represented the Household Brigade at golf, and played for the Harlequins golf club.
