= Arthur Cuthbertson (cricketer) =

English cricketer (1901–1979)

Personal information
- Full name: Arthur Cuthbertson
- Born: 25 August 1901; Belford, Northumberland, England
- Died: 13 February 1979 (aged 77); Reading, Berkshire, England
- Batting: Right-handed
- Bowling: Right-arm medium

Domestic team information
- Years: Team
- 1924: Marylebone Cricket Club
- 1921–1929: Hertfordshire

Career statistics
Competition	First-class
Matches	1
Runs scored	7
Batting average	3.50
100s/50s	0/0
Top score	6
Balls bowled	84
Wickets	1
Bowling average	33.00
5 wickets in innings	0
10 wickets in match	0
Best bowling	1/23
Catches/stumpings	0/–
- Source: Cricinfo, 26 October 2018

Arthur Cuthbertson (25 August 1901 – 13 February 1979) was an English first-class cricketer.

Cuthbertson was born at Belford, Northumberland. He moved south at some point prior to 1921, when he made his debut in minor counties cricket for Hertfordshire against Buckinghamshire at High Wycombe in the Minor Counties Championship. He later made a single appearance in first-class cricket for the Marylebone Cricket Club (MCC) against Oxford University at Lord's in 1924. Batting twice in the match, Cuthbertson was dismissed in the MCC first-innings by Erroll Sinclair for 6 runs, while in their second-innings he was dismissed by Guy Blaikie for a single run. After bowling one over of his medium pace in Oxford University's first-innings, he returned to bowl thirteen overs in their second-innings, taking the wicket of Francis Barnard while on the way to figures of 1/23. He continued to play minor counties cricket intermittently for Hertfordshire until 1929, making a total of ten appearances in the Minor Counties Championship. Cuthbertson died at Reading, Berkshire in February 1979. His son also played at minor counties level for Berkshire.
