= Frederick Toone =

English cricket administrator & rugby union player

Sir Frederick Toone

Sir Frederick Charles Toone (25 June 1868 - 10 June 1930 (aged 61)) was a cricket administrator, who in 1929 became the second man ever to be knighted for cricket-related activities. Unusually for a man who achieved such eminence in the game, he never played cricket at first-class level.

== Cricket administrator ==
Toone was Secretary of Leicestershire from 1897 to 1902 and of Yorkshire from 1903 until his death. He was a great organiser, a quality that was put to particularly good use in ensuring the success of the benefit seasons of the Yorkshire professionals during his time in office. He died at Harrogate, Yorkshire.

He was a popular manager of three successive England touring teams to Australia: those of 1920–21, 1924–25 and 1928–29. It was following the last of these tours that he was knighted for his work in helping to promote good relations between "the Commonwealth and the Mother Country". In Wisden's report of the 1932–33 tour of Australia, it said: "the lamented death of Sir Frederick Toone left the M. C. C. without the most capable manager who has ever represented that body on a foreign tour".

As a young man, Toone played rugby union for Leicester, playing 22 games in the 1892–93 season including playing and scoring in the inaugural game at Welford Road.

== Values ==
Sir Frederick Toone wrote the following "Definition of Cricket" in 1930:

It is a science, the study of a lifetime, in which you may exhaust yourself but never your subject. It is a contest, a duel or melee, calling for courage, skill, strategy and self-control. It is a contest of temper, a trial of honour, a revealer of character. It affords a chance to play the man and act the gentleman. It means going into God's out-of-doors, getting close to nature, fresh air, exercise, a sweeping away of mental cobwebs, genuine recreation of the tired tissues. It is a cure for care, an antidote to worry. It includes companionship with friends, social intercourse, opportunities for courtesy, kindliness, and generosity to an opponent. It promotes not only physical health, but mental force.

== Political concerns ==
The 1924–25 MCC tour took place against a background of social disturbance in Australia. There were concerns in Australian society over the growing influence of communism and, according to the historian Andrew Moore, some commentators hoped that the tour would help to ease tension. It was expected that the influence and popularity of the captain, Arthur Gilligan, would assist this process. However, during the tour, the Australian secret service were informed by the London authorities that Gilligan and Frederick Toone were members of the British Fascists. Although the organisation never achieved the same level of influence in Britain as the British Union of Fascists, which formed in 1932, the British Fascists were popular for a short time during the mid-1920s. The primary focus of the organisation was to oppose communism, but MI5 considered its threat serious enough to warrant placing leading members under surveillance. In addition, the British Foreign Office were aware that the British Fascists had established some links overseas. Moore suggests that it is possible that Gilligan and Toone used the tour as an opportunity to establish links in Australia.

The team visited many parts of Australia and attended many social events which presented an opportunity to discuss politics. Shortly after the tour's conclusion, Australia's Commonwealth Investigative Branch uncovered evidence that the British Fascists had established chapters in several Australian cities, although they did not know how this had happened. Moore believes that "it may be totally coincidental that the Australian chapter of the British Fascists was established so soon after the MCC tour", but is more likely that Gilligan and Toone brought Fascist literature to Australia for distribution. However, Moore writes that "the British Fascists' Australian operations were small beer indeed" and of little consequence.
