= Montague MacLean =

English cricketer

- Lord Hawke's XI in India 1892-93. MacLean is standing at the far left.

Personal information
- Full name: Montague Francis MacLean
- Born: 12 September 1870; Kensington, London, England
- Died: 14 January 1951 (aged 80); Ross-on-Wye, Herefordshire, England
- Batting: Unknown
- Bowling: Unknown
- Relatives: John MacLean (son)

Domestic team information
- Years: Team
- 1893: Marylebone Cricket Club

Career statistics
Competition	First-class
Matches	5
Runs scored	65
Batting average	21.66
100s/50s	–/–
Top score	25
Balls bowled	40
Wickets	0
Bowling average	-
5 wickets in innings	-
10 wickets in match	-
Best bowling	-
Catches/stumpings	3/–
- Source: Cricinfo, 29 July 2019

Montague Francis MacLean (12 September 1870 – 14 January 1951) was an English first-class cricketer.

The son of Sir Francis William Maclean and Mattie Sowerby, he was born at Kensington in November 1871. He was educated at Eton College, before going up to Trinity College, Cambridge. He toured Ceylon and India with Lord Hawke's XI in 1892–93, making his debut in first-class cricket on the tour against the Parsees at Bombay. He made three further first-class appearances on the tour, scoring 63 runs on the tour, with a high score of 25. In May 1893, he made a single first-class appearance for the Marylebone Cricket Club at Lord's.

MacLean married Florence Pease in July 1896, with the couple having three children. MacLean was a leading figure in the coal mining industry. He was the managing director of Broomhill Collieries from 1900–05 and served as the chairman of United Collieries from 1910–32. He was a member of both the Coal Advisory Committee and the Royal Commission on Mining Subsidence, in addition to being a justice of the peace for Herefordshire and Northumberland. He died at Ross-on-Wye in January 1951. His son, John, also played first-class cricket.
