= Gareth Crwys-Williams =

Welsh cricketer and HM inspector of Schools

Personal information
- Full name: Gareth Crwys-Williams
- Born: 27 December 1907; Crickhowell, Breconshire, Wales
- Died: 8 March 1970 (aged 62); Llangollen, Denbighshire, Wales
- Batting: Unknown
- Bowling: Left-arm medium-fast

Domestic team information
- Years: Team
- 1950–1951: Lincolnshire
- 1934: Marylebone Cricket Club
- 1932–1933: Monmouthshire

Career statistics
Competition	First-class
Matches	1
Runs scored	0
Batting average	–
100s/50s	–/–
Top score	0*
Balls bowled	30
Wickets	0
Bowling average	–
5 wickets in innings	–
10 wickets in match	–
Best bowling	–
Catches/stumpings	–/–
- Source: Cricinfo, 28 September 2018

Gareth Crwys-Williams OBE (27 December 1907 – 8 March 1970) was a Welsh cricketer and a HM Inspector of Schools.

Crwys-Williams was born at Crickhowell in March 1907. He studied at Downing College, Cambridge, where he played for the college cricket team. However, he never played for the Cambridge University Cricket Club. He first played minor counties cricket for Monmouthshire in 1932 against Dorset, playing a further Minor Counties Championship match the following year. He made his only appearance in first-class cricket for the Marylebone Cricket Club in 1934 against Ireland at College Park, Dublin. He later played minor counties cricket for Lincolnshire from 1950–1951. He worked as an HM Inspector of Schools, for which he received an OBE for services to in 1969. He died at Llangollen, Denbighshire, in March 1970.
