= Harold Gilligan =

English cricketer

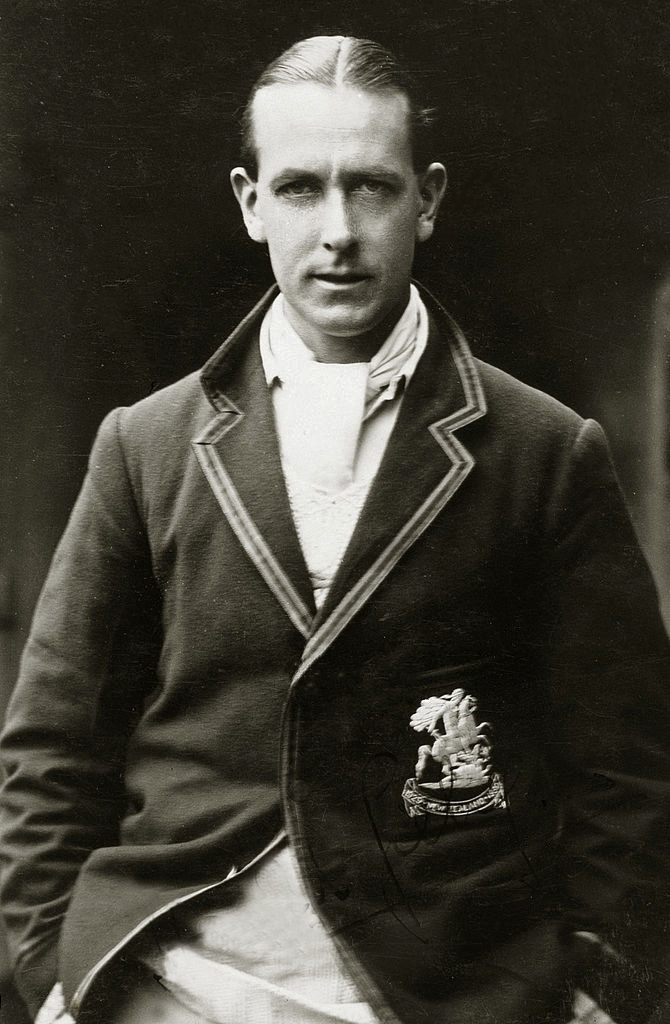
- Gilligan in 1929

Personal information
- Born: 29 June 1896; Denmark Hill, Surrey, England
- Died: 5 May 1978 (aged 81); Shamley Green, Surrey, England
- Batting: Right-handed
- Bowling: Leg break

International information
- National side: England
- Test debut: 10 January 1930 v New Zealand
- Last Test: 24 February 1930 v New Zealand

Career statistics
Competition	Test	First-class
Matches	4	321
Runs scored	71	8,873
Batting average	17.75	17.96
100s/50s	0/0	1/44
Top score	32	143
Balls bowled	–	7,094
Wickets	–	115
Bowling average	–	33.66
5 wickets in innings	–	0
10 wickets in match	–	0
Best bowling	–	4/13
Catches/stumpings	0/–	123/–
- Source: Cricinfo, 9 December 2019

Alfred Herbert Harold Gilligan AFC (29 June 1896 – 5 May 1978) was an English first-class cricketer who played for Sussex and England. Gilligan captained England on their four-Test tour of New Zealand in 1929–30, which England won 1–0.

== Life and career ==
After attending Dulwich College, Gilligan served in the First World War, and was awarded the Air Force Cross. He played regularly for Sussex from 1919 to 1930. A right-handed batsman of style but limited ability, and an occasional leg-spin bowler, Gilligan set a record in 1923 that is unlikely to be equalled when, in batting 70 times during the season, he scored 1,186 runs at an average of 17.70 runs per innings: the average is the lowest by any cricketer who has made 1,000 runs in a season. He had his most successful season in 1929, scoring 1,161 runs at an average of 23.69, including his only first-class century, 143 against Derbyshire. His Wisden obituary described him as a "beautiful stylist" who typically got out to an impetuous stroke just when a substantial innings looked possible. He toured South Africa with S. B. Joel's XI in 1924–25, virtually an England second team, but was not successful and did not play in any of the five matches against South Africa.

Gilligan's brother Arthur captained England in 1924–25, making them the first, and to date only, brothers to have captained England. Arthur was originally selected to be captain-manager of the tour of New Zealand in 1929–30, but illness prevented him from going, and the selectors asked Harold instead. Maurice Allom, a member of the touring team to New Zealand, wrote in 1978 of Gilligan's captaincy on that tour: "He proved himself not only an astute captain but also a diplomat of considerable ability. His charming and likeable personality was, in large measure, responsible for this tour being remembered to this day with affection by many New Zealanders."

The Test tour of New Zealand was played at the same time as an England Test tour to the West Indies, where England were captained by the Honourable Freddie Calthorpe. Harold Gilligan frequently deputised as Sussex captain when Arthur was absent, and in 1930 he captained the team for the whole season.

Both brothers attended Dulwich College, as did their brother Frank, who played for Essex. Harold's daughter, Virginia, married the England Test captain Peter May in 1959; they had four daughters.

After the Second World War, Gilligan became active in the administration of the Surrey County Cricket Club and the Marylebone Cricket Club.

Sporting positions
Preceded by Jack White	English national cricket captain with Honourable Freddie Calthorpe; 1929/1930	Succeeded by Percy Chapman
Preceded by Arthur Gilligan	Sussex county cricket captain 1930	Succeeded by Duleepsinhji
