= Erroll Sinclair =

English cricketer, tea merchant

Personal information
- Full name: Erroll Hamish Lindsay Graeme Sinclair
- Born: 10 September 1904; Goring-on-Thames, Oxfordshire, England
- Died: 24 February 1954 (aged 49) aboard RMS Orion, off Marsa Alam, Egypt
- Batting: Left-handed
- Bowling: Leg break

Domestic team information
- Years: Team
- 1924: Oxford University
- 1926/27: Ceylon

Career statistics
Competition	First-class
Matches	7
Runs scored	126
Batting average	12.60
100s/50s	–/–
Top score	37
Balls bowled	1,005
Wickets	19
Bowling average	33.63
5 wickets in innings	–
10 wickets in match	–
Best bowling	4/56
Catches/stumpings	2/–
- Source: Cricinfo, 16 April 2020

Erroll Hamish Lindsay Graeme Sinclair (10 September 1904 – 24 February 1954) was an English first-class cricketer and tea merchant in Ceylon.

Sinclair was born in September 1904 at Goring-on-Thames, Oxfordshire. He was educated at Winchester College, before going up to Brasenose College, Oxford. While studying at Oxford, he made his debut in first-class cricket for Oxford University against the Marylebone Cricket Club at Lord's in 1924, with Sinclair featuring in four first-class matches for Oxford, including The University Match against Cambridge. He scored 87 runs for Oxford in his four matches, with a high score of 37, while with his leg break bowling he took 12 wickets at an average of 33.33, with best figures of 3 for 65.

After graduating from Oxford, sinclair travelled to British Ceylon where he became assistant manager of the Mousa Ella tea plantation in 1926. While in Ceylon, he featured in further first-class matches during the Marylebone Cricket Club's tour of Ceylon in January and February 1927, playing one match apiece for the Europeans (Ceylon), an Up-Country XI and an All-Ceylon XI. His career best bowling figures of 4 for 56 came for the Up-Country XI. Sinclair died at sea in September 1954 aboard RMS Orion off the coast of Marsa Alam, Egypt.
