= Thomas Welch (cricketer) =

English cricketer

Thomas Bacon Gascoigne Welch (1906–1972) was an English cricketer active from 1922 to 1931 who played for Northamptonshire (Northants). He was born in Reigate, Surrey on 31 July 1906 and died in London on 16 March 1972. Welch appeared in 33 first-class matches as a righthanded batsman who bowled right arm fast medium pace. He scored 767 runs with a highest score of 69 and took five wickets with a best performance of one for 4.
