= William Wignall =

English cricketer

William Harold Wignall (24 December 1908 – 1 June 1982) was an English first-class cricketer active 1932–38 who played for Middlesex and Marylebone Cricket Club (MCC). He was born in Harrow and died in Northwick Park. He played in six first-class matches as a right-handed batsman, scoring 152 runs with a highest score of 72 and held four catches.
