= Francis Barnard (English cricketer) =

English cricketer

Personal information
- Full name: Francis Herbert Barnard
- Born: 6 May 1902; Castries, Saint Lucia
- Died: 4 April 1996 (aged 93); Tunbridge Wells, Kent
- Source: Cricinfo, 30 March 2017

Francis Barnard (6 May 1902 – 4 April 1996) was an English cricketer. He played twenty-three first-class matches for Oxford University Cricket Club between 1922 and 1924. He was born in Saint Lucia; by 1934, he had returned there and was captain of the Saint Lucian tennis team. He was honorary vice-consul of Norway in Saint Lucia and was appointed a Chevalier of the Order of St Olav in 1955.

== See also ==
- List of Oxford University Cricket Club players
