= Richard Hill (cricketer, born 1900) =

English cricketer

Richard Hamilton Hill (28 November 1900 – 5 October 1959) was an English first-class cricketer active 1921–31 who played for Middlesex and Marylebone Cricket Club (MCC). He was born in Kensington; died in Westerham.
