= Edgar Backhouse =

English cricketer (1901–1936)

Edgar Norman Backhouse (13 May 1901 – 1 November 1936) was an English cricketer, who made one first-class appearance for Yorkshire in 1931, and another for the Marylebone Cricket Club (MCC) in 1932. Backhouse was born in Sheriff Hutton, Yorkshire, England, and was a right-handed batsman and left arm medium pace bowler.

== Career ==
Playing for Yorkshire against the Rest of England in the Champion County match at The Oval in September 1931, Backhouse bowled four overs for four runs, as the Rest were bowled out for 124 by Bill Bowes and Hedley Verity. He was bowled by Bill Voce for two runs, batting at number 10 in his only innings, and was not asked to bowl again when the Rest compiled 290 second time around in a drawn game.

His second and final first-class match was scarcely more successful, when he turned out the following year at Lord's for the MCC against Kent. He was out for 0 and 1, but did take three wickets for 130 in Kent's mammoth 431. He beat captain Arthur Chapman to have him stumped by Franklin for 72, dismissed B.H. Valentine in the same manner for 45 and then bowled W.H. Ashdown for 7. His labours were in vain as Kent won the match by 10 wickets. This was not his first appearance at Lord's as, in 1927, he had taken four wickets playing for the Young Professionals against the Young Amateurs, in a non first-class fixture.

He went on to play Minor Counties cricket for Staffordshire between 1934 and 1936.

He died in a motor accident in High Wycombe, Buckinghamshire, in November 1936, at the age of 35.
