= Jack Wheatley =

English cricketer

Jack Brian Wheatley (12 October 1903 – 29 April 1982) was an English first-class cricketer active between 1924 and 1932 who played for Middlesex and Marylebone Cricket Club (MCC). He was born in Wandsworth, was educated at St Paul's School and Merton College, Oxford, and died in Sedlescombe.
