= Arthur E. Scott =

Arthur E. "Scotty" Scott (March 14, 1917 – December 2, 1976) was the United States Senate's first photo-historian. He was a professional photographer in Washington, D.C., from 1934 to 1976.

== Early life and career ==
Born in Montpelier, Vermont, Scott spent most of his life in Washington, D.C. In 1925 his family moved to the capital, where they owned and operated a rooming house near Constitution Ave., NW. Scott began his press career in 1930 at the age of thirteen as a copyboy for a Hearst newspaper, the Washington Times-Herald. By the age of seventeen, he had signed on as a full-time photographer for Hearst's International News Photos (INP), covering Capitol Hill and the White House. He remained a press photographer for the next twenty-one years, working for both INP and Wide World Photos. Scott served as the president of the White House News Photographers Association in 1945. He was also a charter member and regional director of the National Press Photographers Association, as well as a founding member of the "One More Club" during the Truman administration.

== Senate work ==
Although the Capitol has been a subject of photography since 1846, the United States Congress's first forays into institutional photography did not take place for another century, when the political parties began hiring and paying their own photographers. In 1955, Arizona Republican Senator Barry Goldwater, himself an amateur photographer, hired Arthur Scott to work for the Republican Senatorial Committee. Thereafter, he worked in a variety of Republican offices, including the Republican Senatorial Committee (June 1955 to October 1962) and the Republican Policy Committee (October 1962 to November 1974). He snapped formal and informal poses of senators in committee, with constituents, with celebrities, and performing other senatorial duties. He also took many shots of the Capitol in every season and under various stages of reconstruction.

In 1975, the Senate created the Historical Office and commissioned it to collect, maintain, and make available items relating to the Senate's history. A key part of the office was to be a photo historian, who would build a collection of graphic representations of the Senate. In August 1975, Scott assumed the post of photo historian.

== Archive ==
Prior to his death in 1976, Scott had arranged for his personal photographic collection—some 30,000 negatives and prints—to be transferred to the Senate Historical Office. His images hold both historic importance and artistic significance. A donated collection of Scott's works is also housed at the Special Collections Research Center at George Mason University.
