= Arthur Scott (footballer) =

Australian rules footballer

Personal information
- Full name: Arthur John Melville Scott
- Born: 24 May 1878; Geelong, Victoria
- Died: 8 September 1957 (aged 79); Elwood, Victoria
- Original team: Brighton / Haileybury College
- Height: 173 cm (5 ft 8 in)
- Weight: 67 kg (148 lb)

Playing career^{1}
Years	Club	Games (Goals)
1900–1901	St Kilda	14 (4)
- ^{1} Playing statistics correct to the end of 1901.

Arthur John Melville Scott (24 May 1878 – 8 September 1957) was an Australian rules footballer who played for the St Kilda Football Club in the Victorian Football League (VFL).
