= Frederick Pearson (cricketer) =

English cricketer

Cricket information
- Batting: Right-handed
- Bowling: Right-arm off-break

Career statistics
Competition	First-class
Matches	454
Runs scored	18,735
Batting average	24.23
100s/50s	22/82
Top score	167
Balls bowled	51,060
Wickets	853
Bowling average	28.97
5 wickets in innings	38
10 wickets in match	4
Best bowling	9/41
Catches/stumpings	162/–
- Source: CricketArchive, 8 November 2022

Frederick Albert Pearson (23 September 1880 – 10 November 1963) was an English first-class cricketer. He was an all-rounder who played for Worcestershire between 1900 and 1926. He also appeared three times for Auckland in the 1910–11 season, and was twice selected to represent the Players against the Gentlemen, in 1911 at Scarborough and in 1924 at The Oval. He scored 18,495 of his runs for Worcestershire, placing him (as of 2007) ninth on the county's all-time list, while his 815 wickets for the county are 12th on that ranking.

Born in Brixton, London, Pearson made his first-class debut for Worcestershire against London County in May 1900. He opened the batting, though making little impression as he was dismissed for 7 and 2, and claimed the single wicket of Lionel Wells. He did not have much more success in three further first-class games that season, but caught the eye with match figures of 10–98 in a minor game against a touring West Indian side.

1901 saw him make his maiden century, 108 against Leicestershire, and he finished the year with 945 first-class runs at 21.97, while with the ball he claimed 51 wickets at 31.37 including four occasions on which he took five or more wickets in an innings. Several lean years followed (indeed, in 1903 he bowled only 24 balls in total) but from 1904 until first-class cricket was interrupted by the First World War Pearson was consistent with the bat, his season's aggregates being within 200 runs either side of a thousand in each English season. His bowling was at first less productive, though he did take 8–42 against Surrey in 1907.

In 1910–11, Pearson served a season as coach of the Auckland Cricket Association, and played three games for Auckland, twice taking six wickets in an innings: this included a haul of 6–10 against a Hawke's Bay side whose total of 28 included no score higher than 4 except for Extras (13). After his return to England, his domestic bowling improved: from 1911 to 1914 he took over 40 wickets each season, his tally of 51 in 1913 including a career-best 9–41, although this was in a 12-a-side match (nevertheless considered first-class) for HK Foster's XI against Cambridge University rather than being for his county.

After the war, Pearson appeared only once in 1919, but played in 14 of Worcestershire's 18 County Championship matches the following summer and remained a regular part of the side from then until the end of his first-class career. In 1921 he enjoyed an excellent season with the bat, his 1,498 runs at 36.53 being much his highest aggregate and topping his county's averages. His bowling, however, was perhaps the more important factor to Worcestershire, as a weak side depended heavily on him to supplement Fred Root in the attack. From 1921 to 1925 Pearson always passed 50 wickets, and in 1923 he did the "double" by scoring 1,051 runs and taking a career-best 111 wickets, this latter achievement including ten five-wicket hauls.

His final first-class match was for Worcestershire against Middlesex at Lord's in early September 1926. Only 109 overs were possible, and Worcestershire did not get to bat. However, Pearson did take 3–56. He died at the age of 83 in Droitwich, Worcestershire.
