= William Richard Watkins =

English cricketer

William Richard Watkins (22 June 1904 – 15 October 1986) was an English cricketer.

Bill Watkins was born in Ealing, Middlesex and represented Middlesex as a right-handed batsman and a right-arm slow bowler in 27 first-class matches between 1930 and 1937. He scored 626 runs (average 17.38), with a highest score of 83, his only half century and took 8 catches. He also took 7 wickets (at an average cost of 35.42).

One of his proudest moments was batting with Patsy Hendren at Dudley in 1933, when Hendren made his highest score of 301 not out versus Worcestershire.

He also played for MCC between 1937 and 1947 and coached the MCC Groundstaff. He retired from this role in 1969, but remained well known at Lord's up to the time of his death at Norwood Green.
