= Freddie Calthorpe =

English cricketer (1892-1935)

The Honourable Freddie Calthorpe
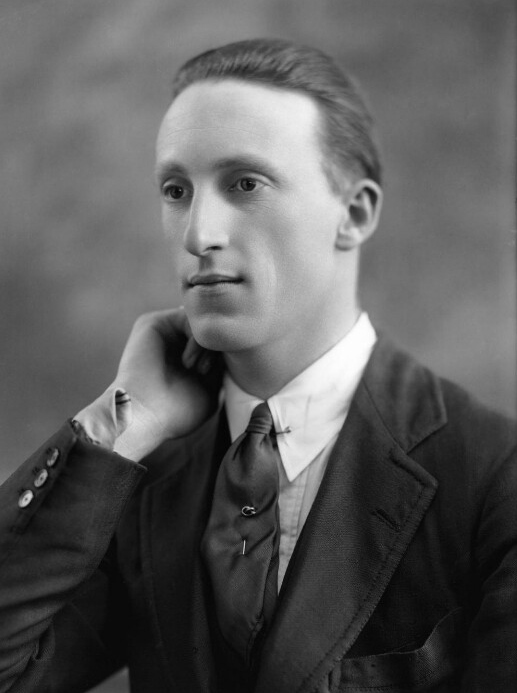
- Calthorpe in 1920

Personal information
- Full name: Frederick Somerset Gough Calthorpe
- Born: 27 May 1892; Kensington, London, England
- Died: 19 November 1935 (aged 43); Worplesdon, Surrey, England
- Batting: Right-handed
- Bowling: Right-arm medium

International information
- National side: England (1930)
- Test debut: 11 January 1930 v West Indies
- Last Test: 12 April 1930 v West Indies

Career statistics
Competition	Tests	First-class
Matches	4	369
Runs scored	129	12,596
Batting average	18.42	24.03
100s/50s	0/0	13/55
Top score	49	209
Balls bowled	204	50,786
Wickets	1	782
Bowling average	91.00	29.91
5 wickets in innings	0	18
10 wickets in match	0	0
Best bowling	1/38	6/17
Catches/stumpings	3/0	217/0
- Source: CricInfo, 5 April 2018

Frederick Somerset Gough Calthorpe (27 May 1892 – 19 November 1935), styled The Honourable from 1912, was an English first-class cricketer.

Born in London, Calthorpe ("pronounced with the first syllable rhyming with 'tall' and not with 'shall'") was a member of the Gough-Calthorpe family, the son of Somerset Frederick Gough-Calthorpe, who inherited the title of 8th Baron Calthorpe in 1912. Freddie Calthorpe was educated at Windlesham House School, Repton and Jesus College, Cambridge. He served in the Royal Air Force during World War I.

In a first-class career that extended from 1911 to 1935, Calthorpe played cricket for Sussex, Cambridge University, Warwickshire and England. He toured with Marylebone Cricket Club (MCC) to Australia and New Zealand in 1922–23, a trip that also served as a honeymoon for him and his bride Dorothy. He captained Warwickshire from 1920 to 1929, and also led a strong MCC team on a tour of the West Indies in 1925–26.

He captained England in his only four Test matches: on the first ever Test tour of the West Indies in 1929–30, which was drawn 1–1. This tour was played simultaneously to another England Test tour to New Zealand, where England were captained by Harold Gilligan. During the tour, in a speech he gave in Barbados, he condemned the bowling tactic, later known as bodyline, which had been used by the West Indian fast bowler Learie Constantine.

He died of cancer in Worplesdon, Surrey.

Calthorpe is distantly related to the cricket commentator Henry Blofeld, and more closely to the England captain H. D. G. Leveson Gower and the early cricket patron John Sackville, 3rd Duke of Dorset.

Sporting positions
Preceded by Jack White	English national cricket captain with Harold Gilligan; 1929/1930	Succeeded by Percy Chapman
Preceded by George Stephens	Warwickshire County Cricket Captain; 1920–1929	Succeeded by Bob Wyatt
