= Edward Sweetland =

English cricketer

Edward Henry Sweetland (25 April 1903 – 18 July 1978) was an English first-class cricketer active 1927–33 who played for Middlesex and Marylebone Cricket Club (MCC). A wicketkeeper, he was born in Westminster; died in Middleton-on-Sea.
