= Aubrey Hodges (cricketer) =

English cricketer and physician

Personal information
- Full name: Aubrey Davis Hodges
- Born: 3 February 1912; Kampala, Uganda Protectorate
- Died: 27 May 1944 (aged 32); Minna, Northern Region, Nigeria
- Batting: Right-handed

Domestic team information
- Years: Team
- 1936: Marylebone Cricket Club

Career statistics
Competition	First-class
Matches	1
Runs scored	44
Batting average	22.00
100s/50s	–/–
Top score	34
Catches/stumpings	–/–
- Source: Cricinfo, 25 September 2021

Aubrey Davis Hodges (3 February 1912 – 27 May 1944) was an English first-class cricketer, British Army officer and physician.

The son of Lieutenant Colonel Aubrey Dallas Percival Hodges, who was the Chief Medical Officer for the Uganda Protectorate, he was born at Kampala in February 1912. He was educated in England at Epsom College, where he played in the cricket and rugby teams. He followed in his fathers footsteps in medicine, studying at King's College Hospital from 1933 to 1936. Hodges made a single appearance in first-class cricket for the Marylebone Cricket Club (MCC) against Ireland at Dublin in 1936. Batting twice in the match, he was dismissed in the MCC first innings by James Boucher for 34 runs, while in their second innings he opened the batting and was dismissed for 10 runs by the same bowler. From 1937, his medical career took him to Nigeria, after which he spent little time in England. At the outbreak of the Second World War in September 1939, Hodges joined the Nigeria Field Ambulance and was a company commander throughout the East African campaign. After the conclusion of the Italian guerrilla war in Ethiopia, Hodges returned to practicing medicine in a civilian setting. He died the following year in May 1944 at Minna in Nigeria.
