= Norman Moffat =

English cricketer

Norman John Douglas Moffat (13 September 1883 – 11 October 1972) was an English first-class cricketer active 1921–26 who played for Middlesex and Marylebone Cricket Club (MCC). He was born in Edenhall, Roxburghshire; died in Dartford.
