= Anne Jessopp =

Anne Jessopp CBE
- Born: Patricia Anne Jessopp; Preston, Lancashire, U.K.
- Occupation: Businesswoman
- Known for: Chief Executive Officer of the British Royal Mint

Patricia Anne Jessopp CBE (born October 1963), known professionally as Anne Jessopp, is the chief executive officer of the British Royal Mint, and former Director of Commemorative Coins for the Royal Mint.

In the 2024 New Year Honours, Jessopp was appointed a Commander of the Order of the British Empire, for services to industry and to the financial sector.

== Early life ==
Jessopp was born in Preston, Lancashire. She was one of the first girls in a boys' school that was turning co-educational. Her father ran his own joinery and double-glazing firm in Preston, Lancashire and encouraged her interest in business. She was unimpressed by the approach to Human resources at Rolls-Royce in Derby, but when she moved to Procter & Gamble she found a role model.
