= Ronald Rutter =

English cricketer

Personal information
- Full name: Ronald Howard Rutter
- Born: 13 July 1910; Amersham, Buckinghamshire, England
- Died: 8 August 1974 (aged 64); Beaconsfield, Buckinghamshire, England
- Batting: Right-handed
- Bowling: Right-arm fast-medium

Domestic team information
- Years: Team
- 1932–1933: Marylebone Cricket Club
- 1929–1936: Minor Counties
- 1928–1947: Buckinghamshire

Career statistics
Competition	First-class
Matches	6
Runs scored	66
Batting average	11.00
100s/50s	–/–
Top score	37*
Balls bowled	931
Wickets	13
Bowling average	31.38
5 wickets in innings	–
10 wickets in match	–
Best bowling	3/27
Catches/stumpings	3/–
- Source: Cricinfo, 15 May 2011

Ronald Howard Rutter (13 July 1910 – 8 August 1974) was an English cricketer. Rutter was a right-handed batsman who bowled right-arm fast-medium. He was born in Amersham, Buckinghamshire and was educated at Tonbridge School, where he represented the school cricket team.

Rutter made his debut for Buckinghamshire in the 1928 Minor Counties Championship against Hertfordshire. He played Minor counties cricket for Buckinghamshire from 1928 to 1947, making 82 appearances. This enabled him to play for the combined Minor Counties cricket team, it was for them that he made his first-class debut for against Lancashire in 1929. He played a further 3 first-class matches for the team, the last coming in 1936 against the touring Indians. He also made 2 further first-class appearances during his career, which came for the Marylebone Cricket Club, both times against Cambridge University in 1932 and 1933.

In total, Rutter played 7 first-class matches. In these he scored 66 runs at a batting average of 11.00, with a high score of 37*. With the ball he took 13 wickets at a bowling average of 31.38, with best figures of 3/27.
