= John MacLean (English cricketer) =

English cricketer

Personal information
- Full name: John Francis MacLean
- Born: 1 March 1901; Morwick Hill, Acklington, Northumberland, England
- Died: 9 March 1986 (aged 85); Ross-on-Wye, Herefordshire, England
- Batting: Right-handed
- Role: Wicketkeeper-batsman

Career statistics
Competition	First-class
Matches	69
Runs scored	1,812
Batting average	18.48
100s/50s	1/3
Top score	121
Catches/stumpings	60/43
- Source: Cricinfo, 29 July 2019

John Francis MacLean (1 March 1901 – 9 March 1986) was an English first-class cricketer: a wicketkeeper-batsman who played county cricket for Gloucestershire and Worcestershire between the wars. He was selected for the Gentlemen against the Players in 1923, and also appeared at first-class level for Marylebone Cricket Club (MCC), HK Foster's XI and Free Foresters.

MacLean attended Eton College and Cambridge University without playing in their First XIs. He made his first-class debut for HK Foster's XI against Worcestershire at Hereford in July 1919, making 12 and 18 not out. He made no dismissals in the match, nor in his appearance for the same side against the Australian Imperial Forces just two days later. His third match, again for HK Foster's XI and once more against Worcestershire, produced an innings of 59 from number ten, but again no dismissals.

He did not play first-class cricket again until 1922, when he was a regular part of a very weak Worcestershire side (they finished bottom of the County Championship with only one win from 26 matches). His county debut, against Warwickshire at Edgbaston, at last gave him his maiden dismissal when he stumped opener Leonard Bates in the second innings. It was not a particularly successful season overall for MacLean, however: he finished with only 459 runs from 41 innings and made 16 dismissals (6 caught, 10 stumped).

That winter MacLean toured Australia and New Zealand with MCC, and though he did poorly against the Australian state sides, he performed rather better on the New Zealand section of the tour, making two half-centuries including 84 in an unofficial Test against New Zealand at Wellington. Returning to England, he enjoyed the best summer of his career with both bat and gloves. His 710 runs included his only hundred: a rearguard, if ultimately unsuccessful, 121 in an hour and a half against Nottinghamshire after Worcestershire had fallen to 56/5 in their second innings. Behind the stumps MacLean managed 46 dismissals, easily his best season's tally.

He played only half a dozen games in 1924, without conspicuous success, and was then absent from first-class cricket until 1930, by which time he had moved to Gloucestershire. He played three times for them that year, and thrice more in 1932, making his last first-class appearance against Middlesex at Clifton College in early August 1932.

MacLean's father Montague MacLean played five first-class matches in the 1890s, for MCC and Lord Hawke's XI.
