= Antony Allen =

English cricketer (1912–2003)

Personal information
- Born: 22 December 1912; Evenley Hall, Brackley, Northamptonshire
- Died: 21 December 2003 (aged 90); Northumberland
- Batting: Right-handed

Career statistics
Competition	First-class
Matches	35
Runs scored	1,928
Batting average	30.60
100s/50s	4/8
Top score	144
Catches/stumpings	13/–
- Source: CricketArchive, 6 December 2022

Antony William Allen (22 December 1912 – 21 December 2003) was an English first-class cricketer.

Allen was educated at Eton and Magdalene College, Cambridge. A right-handed batsman, he played 35 matches for Cambridge University from 1932 to 1934, Northamptonshire County Cricket Club from 1932 to 1936, Marylebone Cricket Club in 1934 and the Free Foresters in 1946 and 1947. He scored 4 first-class centuries, with a highest innings of 144 against Sussex. He also scored 142 against Glamorgan.
