= Neville Jessopp =

English cricketer

Personal information
- Full name: Neville Augustus Jessopp
- Born: 31 July 1898; Sleaford, Lincolnshire, England
- Died: 13 July 1977 (aged 78); Claremont, Cape Province, South Africa
- Batting: Unknown
- Bowling: Left-arm fast-medium

Domestic team information
- Years: Team
- 1914–1920: Norfolk
- 1919: Marylebone Cricket Club

Career statistics
Competition	First-class
Matches	2
Runs scored	2
Batting average	1.00
100s/50s	–/–
Top score	2
Balls bowled	264
Wickets	7
Bowling average	21.42
5 wickets in innings	–
10 wickets in match	–
Best bowling	3/64
Catches/stumpings	2/–
- Source: Cricinfo, 16 July 2019

Neville Augustus Jessopp (31 July 1898 – 13 July 1977) was an English first-class cricketer.

Jessopp was born at Sleaford, Lincolnshire and was educated at Harrow School. He left Harrow in 1916 and went straight into the British Army for service in the First World War, serving as a second lieutenant in the Royal Horse Guards. He resigned his commission shortly after the war, on account of ill health. He made two appearances in first-class cricket for the Marylebone Cricket Club in 1919, playing against the Australian Imperial Forces and Oxford University. He took 7 wickets in these two matches with his left-arm fast-medium bowling, with best figures of 3 for 64. In addition to playing first-class cricket, Jessopp also played minor counties cricket for Norfolk. He debuted before the war in 1914, before making five further appearances in the Minor Counties Championship in 1920. He later emigrated to British East Africa, where he became a farmer. He moved to South Africa later in life, where he died at Claremont, Cape Province.
