= Frank Putner =

English cricketer

Frank William Putner (26 September 1912 – 25 March 1997) was an English first-class cricketer active 1933–39 who played for Middlesex and Marylebone Cricket Club (MCC). He was born in Greenwich; died in Slough.
