= Arthur Scott (cricketer, born 1885) =

English cricketer and businessperson

Personal information
- Full name: Arthur Pickett Scott
- Born: 1 September 1885; Poplar, London, England
- Died: 3 June 1933 (aged 47); Boxgrove, Sussex, England
- Batting: Unknown

Domestic team information
- Years: Team
- 1929: Marylebone Cricket Club

Career statistics
Competition	First-class
Matches	1
Runs scored	40
Batting average	40.00
100s/50s	–/–
Top score	25
Catches/stumpings	–/–
- Source: Cricinfo, 22 June 2021

Arthur Pickett Scott (1 September 1885 — 3 June 1933) was an English first-class cricketer and businessman.

The son of the physician Robert Pickett Scott and his wife Amy, he was born in Poplar, a suburb of London in September 1885. He was educated at Marlborough College, where he played for and captained the college cricket team. He was described by Wisden as a "really good all-rounder". From Marlborough he went up to Peterhouse, Cambridge in 1907. There he lost his bowling skills, and although he scored 65 runs in the freshman match, he did not appear in first-class cricket for Cambridge University Cricket Club in a senior match. After graduating from Cambridge, Scott worked for the Asiatic Petroleum Company, where he was manager of the Hong Kong branch and spent time in Japan at Yokohama, where he met his wife. He later made a single appearance in first-class cricket for the Marylebone Cricket Club (MCC) against the Royal Navy at Chatham in 1929. Batting twice in the match, he ended the MCC first innings not out on 15, while in their second innings he was dismissed for 25 runs by Clement Glenister, having shared in a 53 runs stand for the tenth wicket with Hal Pickthall. Scott died suddenly on 3 June 1933 in woodland near Boxgrove, Sussex.
