= Frank Gilligan =

English cricketer

Personal information
- Full name: Frank William Gilligan
- Born: 20 September 1893; Denmark Hill, London, England
- Died: 4 May 1960 (aged 66); Wanganui, New Zealand
- Batting: Right-handed
- Role: Wicketkeeper-batsman

Career statistics
Competition	First-class
Matches	129
Runs scored	3,024
Batting average	23.62
100s/50s	1/8
Top score	110
Balls bowled	2
Wickets	0
Bowling average	–
5 wickets in innings	–
10 wickets in match	–
Best bowling	–
Catches/stumpings	153/68
- Source: Cricinfo, 11 January 2018

Frank William Gilligan OBE (20 September 1893 – 4 May 1960) was an English cricketer who played for Oxford University and was an integral part of the Essex county side for ten years. He went on to become headmaster of one of New Zealand's top independent schools and was awarded an OBE in 1955 for his services to education.

== Background ==
Frank Gilligan was the son of Willie Austin Gilligan and Alice Eliza (née Kimpton). He was the oldest of four children, having two younger brothers and a sister Kathleen. His two younger brothers, Arthur Gilligan and Harold Gilligan both went on to captain England at cricket. All three brothers attended Dulwich College. Frank was in the school 1st XI for three years (from 1911 to 1913) and was also an excellent Rugby Union player, playing for the 1st XV in 1912 and 1913. He also held the school record for the mile in 1911. From Dulwich College, he had an Exhibition to Worcester College, Oxford to read English. However, whilst there World War I caused him to join the British Army, serving as an officer with the 12th Battalion of the Essex Regiment, rising to the rank of captain, and being mentioned in despatches for his service during the war. On 6 August 1921 he married Miss Brindle of Craven Park, Lancashire at St. James’ Piccadilly.

== First-class cricket ==
At Oxford he won two cricket blues, one as captain, and graduated with honours in English. He went on to play 79 matches as a wicket-keeper for Essex between 1919 and 1929. In all first-class matches he took 153 catches and made 68 stumpings, and averaged 23.62 with the bat. He scored one century, 110 in Oxford University's victory over Essex in 1920.

After he retired from teaching he took up cricket umpiring, officiating in two Plunket Shield matches in 1956 and 1957.

== In education ==
Gilligan joined Uppingham School in 1920, where he eventually became a housemaster. He taught there until 1935, under the headship of another Old Alleynian Reginald Owen. His background in cricket made him the ideal candidate to become the head of cricket at the school and it is reputed that he was responsible for a Golden Age of Uppingham cricket.

From Uppingham he took the headship of Wanganui Collegiate School in New Zealand. He remained in that post for 18 years, leaving in 1954. The Wanganui Collegian wrote, "He believed in good sportsmanship, modesty, tolerance, and seeing the other man's point of view, and he was himself an exemplar of these qualities. He would go to endless trouble to help anybody. To watch him taking a game was a liberal education in the art of coaching. A devotee of using one's feet to play slow bowling and of forward play."

In 1955 he was appointed OBE for his services to education.
