= Henry Swan (cricketer) =

English cricketer and cricket administrator

Henry Swan

Henry Dawes Swan (born 28 July 1879, Newcastle upon Tyne, died 21 December 1941, Bournemouth) was an English cricketer and cricket administrator.

== Life and career ==
Swan attended Uppingham School and Exeter College, Oxford. He left Oxford without taking a degree, and worked for a time in the office of the shipping company Elder Dempster Lines in Bristol before working for a shipbuilding company in Wivenhoe in Essex.

He was elected to the Essex County Cricket Club committee in 1906 and appointed chairman of the committee in 1913. In 1910 he managed a cricket team that toured Portugal. He said in 1913 that he captained or managed about 60 teams in a season.

He played in a variety of matches over many years for the Marylebone Cricket Club (MCC), and was a member of the committee of the MCC. He organised many of the MCC's matches and minor tours, including an annual tour in the Channel Islands. According to one obituary he played more games for MCC "than anyone else ever has".

He served as the New Zealand Cricket Council's representative in London, and visited New Zealand during the cricket season of 1921–22 helping to organise a tour by an MCC team to New Zealand in the 1922–23 season. When the touring team was announced he was named as its manager. Before the tour Sir Home Gordon described Swan as "a man of colossal size, great enthusiasm, possessing fine knowledge of the game as well as a ready wit and imperturbable good temper. He should prove an outstanding [sic] successful feature of the tour."

He played in the opening match of the tour, against Western Australia, making his first-class debut at the age of 43. Batting at number eleven he was out for a duck in his only innings, and when he fielded his physique caused some amusement among the Perth crowd. After that he limited his activities to his managerial duties, and played in only one more match on the tour, a minor match in Nelson. However, he also played in the annual match between former students at British public schools and former Christ's College boys, held that year in Geraldine, South Canterbury.

He returned to England after the tour to begin the organisation of the first New Zealand cricket tour to England, which it was hoped would occur in 1925. It eventually took place in 1927. He continued to represent the New Zealand Cricket Council in London until the 1930s, and was at one stage suggested as a possible manager of the New Zealand team in England in 1931. He was largely responsible for organising the itineraries of New Zealand's 1927 and 1931 tours.
