= Charles Titchmarsh =

English cricketer

Personal information
- Full name: Charles Harold Titchmarsh
- Born: 18 February 1881; Royston, Hertfordshire, England
- Died: 23 May 1930 (aged 49); Royston, Hertfordshire, England
- Batting: Right-handed

Domestic team information
- Years: Team
- 1924: Minor Counties
- 1920–1928: Marylebone Cricket Club
- 1900–1929: Hertfordshire

Career statistics
Competition	First-class
Matches	42
Runs scored	2,589
Batting average	39.22
100s/50s	4/16
Top score	171
Balls bowled	1
Wickets	0
Bowling average	–
5 wickets in innings	–
10 wickets in match	–
Best bowling	–
Catches/stumpings	16/–
- Source: Cricinfo, 11 October 2015

Charles Harold Titchmarsh (18 February 1881 – 23 May 1930) was an English cricketer active in first-class cricket from 1920 to 1928, but was mostly associated with minor counties cricket where he played for Hertfordshire.

== Early life ==
Born at Royston, Hertfordshire, Titchmarsh was educated at the Nonconformist College at Bishop's Stortford, where he spent two years in the cricket XI. He made his debut for Hertfordshire in the 1900 Minor Counties Championship against Cambridgeshire at Fenner's. Titchmarsh played just once for the county in 1900, while the following year he made four appearances. He met with success in 1906, averaging 44, and up until the 1914 season he had only one poor season, in 1909 when he scored only 141 runs in seventeen innings. In all matches in 1913 (most of them club matches, and none of them first-class) he scored 4016 runs at an average of 62.75, with 21 centuries.

== First-class cricket ==
Titchmarsh played for Hertfordshire following the First World War, and in 1920 he made his debut in first-class cricket for the Marylebone Cricket Club (MCC) against the British Army at Lord's. He played matches for MCC in 1921 and 1922, as well as being selected to play for the Gentlemen in the Gentlemen v Players fixtures at The Oval in the same seasons. He toured Australia and New Zealand in late 1922 and early 1923 under the leadership of Archie MacLaren, playing fifteen first-class matches against Australian state and New Zealand provincial sides, during which he scored 887 runs. He played for the East of England cricket team against the touring New Zealanders in 1927, while in the following season he played his final first-class match for MCC against Derbyshire. Titchmarsh made his final appearance for Hertfordshire in 1929, averaging 51 in what would be his final season with the county. He made a total of 182 appearances for Hertfordshire in the Minor Counties Championship from 1900–1929.

Titchmarsh was described by Wisden as possessing "a neat style of batting and strong defence, having, moreover, most of the scoring strokes at his command." He played most of his first-class cricket for MCC, making 36 of his 42 appearances for them. He scored 2,260 runs for MCC, averaging 41.85, making a century score four times, with a highest score of 171. His overall first-class career saw him score 2,589 runs at an average of 39.22.

== Personal life ==
He died from a stroke at Royston on 23 May 1930.
