= Herbert Benka =

English cricketer

Herbert Frank Benka (27 October 1909, in Regent's Park, London, England – 22 April 1970, in Westminster, London, England) was an English first-class cricketer.

Benka represented Middlesex (1933–1936), Minor Counties (1937) and M.C.C. (1939) as a right-handed batsman and a slow left-arm orthodox spin bowler in 13 first-class matches.
