= John Naumann =

English cricketer

John Harold Naumann (9 September 1893 – 6 December 1964) was an English cricketer active from 1913 to 1928 who played for Sussex. He was born in Lewisham and died in New York. He appeared in 44 first-class matches as a righthanded batsman who bowled left arm slow medium pace. He scored 1,391 runs with a highest score of 134 not out and took 36 wickets with a best performance of four for 37.
