= List of Marylebone Cricket Club players (1895–1914) =

Cricketers who debuted for Marylebone Cricket Club (MCC) in first-class matches from the implementation of the official first-class definition in May 1895 until August 1914, after which first-class cricket was suspended until the 1919 season, are as follows. Many of the players represented MCC after the First World War but they are only listed here, as it was in this period that they made their MCC debuts.

The period is often referred to as the "Golden age of cricket". MCC played all its home matches at its Lord's venue in north London. The majority of MCC players were contracted to county clubs or to one of the two main university teams and appeared for MCC by invitation. Some players were from other countries. For much of the 20th century, commencing with its 1903/04 tour of Australia, MCC organised international tours in which the England cricket team played Test matches. The players selected for these tours were contracted to MCC for the duration and appearances by them in non-Tests on the tour were for MCC, therefore any such players are included in this list. MCC teams have always operated at all levels of the sport and players who represented the club in minor cricket only are out of scope here.

The details are the player's usual name followed by the span of years in which he was active as an MCC player in important matches (the span may include years in which he played in minor matches only for MCC and/or years in which he did not represent MCC in any matches) and then his name is given as it appeared on match scorecards (e.g., surname preceded by all initials), followed by the county club or other team with which he was mostly associated (this may be MCC itself). If the player travelled abroad on winter tours organised by MCC, dates and destinations are given at the end of the entry. Players who took part in Test cricket have their names highlighted in bold text.

== A ==
- Herbert Abbott (1902) : H. E. S. Abbott (MCC)
- Ahsan-ul-Haq (1901) : Ahsan-ul-Haq (Middlesex)
- Thomas Allsopp (1904) : T. C. Allsopp (Leicestershire)
- Harry Altham (1913) : H. S. Altham (Surrey)
- Rupert Anson (1914) : R. Anson (Middlesex)
- **Alfred Archer** (1899–1903) : A. G. Archer (Worcestershire)
- Harold Arkwright (1903) : H. A. Arkwright (Essex)
- **Ted Arnold** (1903/04) : E. G. Arnold (Worcestershire). Tours: Australia (1903/04).
- **Ewart Astill** (1909–1931) : W. E. Astill (Leicestershire). Tours: West Indies (1925/26); India & Ceylon (1926/27); South Africa (1927/28); West Indies (1929/30).
- Alfred Atfield (1901) : A. J. Atfield (London County)
- Harold Austin (1909–1926) : H. B. G. Austin (Barbados)

== B ==
- Robert Bagguley (1899–1900) : R. Bagguley (Nottinghamshire)
- Alfred Bailey (1911) : A. E. Bailey (Somerset)
- Henry Baird (1910–1911/12) : H. H. C. Baird (MCC). Tours: South America (1911/12).
- Clare Baker (1906–1912) : C. V. Baker (Middlesex)
- Beresford Baker (1895) : W. B. Baker (MCC)
- Gerald Bardswell (1898) : G. R. Bardswell (Lancashire)
- Kenneth Barker (1898–1903) : K. E. M. Barker (Surrey)
- Merton Barker (1895–1896) : M. M. Barker (MCC)
- Ronald Barnes, 3rd Baron Gorell (1908–1920) : R. G. Barnes (Oxford University)
- **Sydney Barnes** (1907/08–1913/14) : S. F. Barnes (Staffordshire). Tours: Australia (1907/08); Australia (1911/12); South Africa (1913/14).
- Edwin Barnett (1908) : E. E. Barnett (Buckinghamshire)
- Edward Barrett (1903–1920) : E. I. M. Barrett (Hampshire)
- Charles Barrow (1903) : C. D. Barrow (MCC)
- Claude Bateman-Champain (1902) : C. E. Bateman-Champain (Gloucestershire)
- Hugh Bateman-Champain (1902) : H. F. Bateman-Champain (Gloucestershire)
- William Bates (1911) : W. E. Bates (Yorkshire, Glamorgan)
- Lawrence Bathurst (1895–1899) : L. C. V. Bathurst (Middlesex)
- George Beldam (1903–1906) : G. W. Beldam (Middlesex, London County)
- Richard Bennett (1899) : R. A. Bennett (Hampshire)
- Seton Beresford (1909–1910) : S. R. D. H. Beresford (Middlesex)
- Timothy Bevington (1901–1904) : T. A. D. Bevington (Middlesex)
- George Bigge (1898) : G. O. Bigge (Hertfordshire)
- Austin Bird (1914) : A. C. Bird (MCC)
- **Morice Bird** (1908–1913/14) : M. C. Bird (Lancashire, Surrey). Tours: South Africa (1909/10); South America (1911/12); South Africa (1913/14).
- Wilfred Bird (1908–1913) : W. S. Bird (Middlesex)
- Dermot Blundell (1902) : D. H. B. H. Blundell (MCC)
- **Colin Blythe** (1905/06–1909/10) : C. Blythe (Kent). Tours: South Africa (1905/06); Australia (1907/08); South Africa (1909/10).
- **Major Booth** (1913/14) : M. W. Booth (Yorkshire). Tours: South Africa (1913/14).
- **Bernard Bosanquet** (1898–1904) : B. J. T. Bosanquet (Middlesex). Tours: Australia (1903/04).
- Bertrand Bosworth-Smith (1897–1901) : B. N. Bosworth-Smith (MCC)
- Lord Brackley (1898–1905) : Lord Brackley (MCC)
- Robert Braddell (1909–1911) : R. L. L. Braddell (Oxford University)
- Joseph Brain (1901) : J. H. Brain (Gloucestershire)
- George Brann (1896–1898) : G. Brann (Sussex)
- Trevor Branston (1907–1910) : G. T. Branston (Nottinghamshire). Tours: North America (1907); New Zealand (1906/07).
- **Len Braund** (1902–1910) : L. C. Braund (Somerset). Tours: Australia (1903/04); Australia (1907/08).
- Edward Bray (1898–1906) : E. H. Bray (Middlesex)
- Eliot Bromley-Martin (1899–1900) : E. G. Bromley-Martin (Worcestershire)
- Granville Bromley-Martin (1900) : G. E. Bromley-Martin (Worcestershire)
- Francis Brooke (1914–1921) : F. R. R. Brooke (Lancashire)
- **George Brown** (1910/11–1930) : G. Brown (Hampshire). Tours: West Indies (1910/11); South Africa (1922/23); India & Ceylon (1926/27).
- Frederick Browning (1907–1908) : F. H. Browning (MCC). Tours: North America (1907).
- John Buchanan (1910) : J. N. Buchanan (Cambridge University)
- **Claude Buckenham** (1906–1913) : C. P. Buckenham (Essex). Tours: South Africa (1909/10).
- George Buckston (1904) : G. M. Buckston (Derbyshire)
- Roland Burn (1905) : R. C. W. Burn (Oxford University). Tours: North America (1905).
- William Burns (1906/07–1912) : W. B. Burns (Worcestershire). Tours: New Zealand (1906/07).
- Cuthbert Burnup (1899–1903) : C. J. Burnup (Kent)
- John Burrell (1895–1897) : R. J. Burrell (Essex)
- Cecil Burton (1910/11–1922) : D. C. F. Burton (Yorkshire). Tours: West Indies (1910/11); West Indies (1912/13).
- David Burton (1910/11) : D. S. G. Burton (MCC). Tours: West Indies (1910/11).
- Arthur Butcher (1902–1905) : A. Butcher (Hertfordshire)
- Brian Butler (1913–1914) : B. D. Butler (MCC)
- **Harry Butt** (1895–1912) : H. R. Butt (Sussex)
- Hugh Butterworth (1906) : H. M. Butterworth (Oxford University)
- Robert Buxton (1909) : R. V. Buxton (Middlesex)
- William Bythell (1903) : W. J. Bythell (MCC)

== C ==
- Malcolm Carlisle (1904) : M. M. Carlisle (MCC)
- John Carr (1913) : J. L. Carr (Berkshire)
- Buns Cartwright (1913–1928) : G. H. G. M. Cartwright (Oxford University)
- William Case (1896) : W. S. Case (Oxfordshire)
- Basil Cave (1902) : B. S. Cave (MCC)
- Edward Challenor (1906–1914) : E. L. Challenor (Leicestershire)
- Herbert Chaplin (1911–1912) : H. P. Chaplin (Sussex)
- Stephen Charles (1895–1905) : S. F. Charles (Norfolk)
- Harry Chidgey (1913) : H. Chidgey (Somerset)
- Harry Chinnery (1897–1902) : H. B. Chinnery (Middlesex, Surrey)
- Peter Clarke (1913–1914) : P. Clarke (Middlesex, Ireland)
- Humphry Cobb (1896) : H. H. Cobb (Middlesex)
- Philip Cobbold (1900–1921) : P. W. Cobbold (Cambridge University)
- Toby Colbeck (1911) : L. G. Colbeck (Middlesex)
- Terence Cole (1899) : T. G. O. Cole (Lancashire, Derbyshire, Somerset)
- Bill Coleman (1902–1909) : W. E. Coleman (Hertfordshire)
- David Collins (1911) : D. C. Collins (Wellington, Cambridge University)
- Lionel Collins (1907–1910) : L. P. Collins (Oxford University). Tours: North America (1907).
- Arthur Conan Doyle (1900–1904) : A. I. Conan Doyle (MCC)
- Arthur Coode (1901) : A. T. Coode (Middlesex)
- George Cox, Sr. (1900–1927) : G. R. Cox (Sussex)
- Eric Crake (1912) : E. H. Crake (MCC)
- Ralph Crake (1901) : R. H. Crake (MCC)
- Beaumont Cranfield (1899–1903) : B. Cranfield (Somerset)
- **Jack Crawford** (1905/06–1907/08) : J. N. Crawford (Surrey). Tours: South Africa (1905/06); Australia (1907/08).
- Vivian Crawford (1902–1908) : V. F. S. Crawford (Surrey, Leicestershire)
- Stafford Crawley (1897–1898) : A. S. Crawley (Hertfordshire)
- William Creese (1913/14) : W. H. Creese (Transvaal). Tours: South Africa (1913/14).
- Gerry Crutchley (1910–1927) : G. E. V. Crutchley (Middlesex)
- Foster Cunliffe (1899–1903) : F. H. E. Cunliffe (Middlesex)
- Wilfred Curwen (1906/07–1910) : W. J. H. Curwen (Surrey, Oxford University). Tours: New Zealand (1906/07).
- Edward Cuthbertson (1914) : E. H. Cuthbertson (Cambridge University)
- Sir Charles Cuyler, 4th Baronet (1895) : C. Cuyler (MCC)

== D ==
- Harry Primrose, 6th Earl of Rosebery (1908–1920) : Lord Dalmeny (Middlesex)
- John Daniell (1911) : J. Daniell (Somerset)
- Horace Davenport (1898) : H. J. Davenport (MCC)
- Arthur Day (1912) : A. P. Day (Kent)
- Samuel Day (1909) : S. H. Day (Kent)
- George Dennett (1905–1906) : E. G. Dennett (Gloucestershire)
- **David Denton** (1905/06–1909/10) : D. Denton (Yorkshire). Tours: South Africa (1905/06); South Africa (1909/10).
- Ted Dillon (1902) : E. W. Dillon (Kent)
- Claude Disney-Roebuck (1906) : C. D. Disney-Roebuck (MCC)
- Bernard Dobson (1912/13) : B. P. Dobson (MCC). Tours: West Indies (1912/13).
- George Docker (1911–1914) : G. A. M. Docker (MCC). Tours: West Indies (1912/13).
- Mordaunt Doll (1908–1919) : M. H. C. Doll (Middlesex). Tours: West Indies (1912/13).
- Christian Doll (1900–1904) : C. C. T. Doll (Cambridge University)
- **Johnny Douglas** (1907–1930) : J. W. H. T. Douglas (Essex). Tours: North America (1907); New Zealand (1906/07); Australia (1911/12); South Africa (1913/14); Australia (1920/21); Australia (1924/25).
- Stanley Douglas-Jones (1913–1914) : S. D. Douglas-Jones (MCC)
- Edward Dowson (1913) : E. M. Dowson (Surrey)
- Eliot Druce (1898) : E. A. C. Druce (Kent)
- **Frank Druce** (1902) : N. F. Druce (Cambridge University, Surrey)
- Walter Druce (1896–1913) : W. G. Druce (Cambridge University)
- Alexander Drummond (1911–1921) : A. V. Drummond (Buckinghamshire)
- George Drummond (1903/04–1906) : G. H. Drummond (Northamptonshire). Tours: Australia (1903/04).
- Arthur du Boulay (1910) : A. H. du Boulay (Kent, Gloucestershire)

== E ==
- William East (1902–1912) : W. East (Northamptonshire)
- Charles Ebden (1905–1909) : C. H. M. Ebden (Sussex, Middlesex)
- Alexander Eccles (1903) : A. Eccles (Lancashire)
- Basil Eddis (1908) : B. E. G. Eddis (MCC)
- John Evans (1912–1921) : A. J. Evans (Hampshire, Kent)
- William Evans (1903) : W. H. B. Evans (Worcestershire, Hampshire)
- Charles Eyre (1905) : C. H. Eyre (MCC). Tours: North America (1905)

== F ==
- Sydney Fairbairn (1912/13) : S. G. Fairbairn (Buckinghamshire). Tours: West Indies (1912/13).
- Michael Falcon (1911–1929) : M. Falcon (Norfolk)
- **Frederick Fane** (1895–1919) : F. L. Fane (Essex, London County). Tours: South Africa (1905/06); Australia (1907/08); South Africa (1909/10).
- Charles Farmer (1905–1906) : C. G. E. Farmer (MCC)
- **Aubrey Faulkner** (1912–1920) : G. A. Faulkner (Transvaal)
- Arthur Fernie (1901) : A. E. Fernie (Cambridge University)
- **Arthur Fielder** (1903/04–1914) : A. Fielder (Kent). Tours: Australia (1903/04); Australia (1907/08).
- William Findlay (1902–1911/12) : W. Findlay (Lancashire). Tours: South America (1911/12).
- Frank Finlay (1902) : F. D. Finlay (MCC)
- Charles Dennis Fisher (1903) : C. D. Fisher (Sussex)
- Percy FitzGerald (1897) : P. D. Fitzgerald (MCC)
- Dudley Forbes (1898) : D. H. Forbes (Oxford University)
- Basil Foster (1906–1912) : B. S. Foster (Worcestershire)
- **Frank Foster** (1911/12) : F. R. Foster (Warwickshire). Tours: Australia (1911/12).
- Geoffrey Foster (1910–1931) : G. N. Foster (Worcestershire)
- Harry Foster (1897–1909) : H. K. Foster (Worcestershire)
- **R. E. Foster** (1899–1903/04) : R. E. Foster (Worcestershire). Tours: Australia (1903/04).
- Wilfrid Foster (1899–1900) : W. L. Foster (Worcestershire)
- Robert St Leger Fowler (1913) : R. S. Fowler (Hampshire)
- Herbert Fox (1906–1910) : R. H. Fox (Somerset). Tours: New Zealand (1906/07).
- Raymond Fox (1904–1906) : R. W. Fox (Sussex)
- Walter Franklin (1914–1933) : W. B. Franklin (Cambridge University)
- Eric Fulcher (1911/12–1921) : E. J. Fulcher (Kent). Tours: South America (1911/12).

== G ==
- Shivajirao Gaekwad (1911) : S. Gaekwad (Oxford University)
- Jack Gannon (1908–1910) : J. R. C. Gannon (MCC)
- Hubert Garrett (1914) : H. F. Garrett (Somerset)
- Herbert Gaussen (1910/11) : H. P. L. Gaussen (Hertfordshire). Tours: West Indies (1910/11).
- Kenneth Gibson (1911–1912) : K. L. Gibson (Essex)
- James Gifford (1897–1898) : J. Gifford (MCC)
- Humphrey Gilbert (1910–1923) : H. A. Gilbert (Worcestershire)
- Frank Gillingham (1908–1928) : F. H. Gillingham (Essex)
- James Gilman (1900–1904) : J. Gilman (London County, Middlesex)
- Alfred Glover (1899) : A. C. S. Glover (Warwickshire)
- Richard Godsell (1905) : R. T. Godsell (Gloucestershire). Tours: North America (1905).
- Kenneth Goldie (1907–1911) : K. O. Goldie (Sussex, London County). Tours: North America (1907).
- Cecil Goodden (1900–1903) : C. P. Goodden (Dorset)
- Cleveland Greenway (1895) : C. E. Greenway (Somerset)
- J. G. Greig (1898–1910) : J. G. Greig (Hampshire)
- Neville Grell (1910/11) : E. L. G. N. Grell (Trinidad). Tours: West Indies (1910/11).
- Gerard Griffin (1903) : G. S. F. Griffin (Middlesex)
- Gordon Guggisberg (1905) : F. G. Guggisberg (MCC)
- George Gunn (1907/08–1929/30) : G. Gunn (Nottinghamshire). Tours: Australia (1907/08); Australia (1911/12); West Indies (1929/30).

== H ==
- **Nigel Haig** (1912–1934) : N. E. Haig (Middlesex). Tours: West Indies (1929/30).
- **Schofield Haigh** (1905/06) : S. Haigh (Yorkshire). Tours: South Africa (1905/06).
- Warren Hale (1897) : W. S. Hale (Middlesex)
- **Ernest Halliwell** (1904) : E. A. Halliwell (Transvaal)
- Alick Handford (1895–1901) : A. Handford (Nottinghamshire)
- **Joe Hardstaff senior** (1906–1926) : J. Hardstaff senior (Nottinghamshire). Tours: Australia (1907/08).
- Percy Hardy (1912) : F. P. Hardy (Somerset)
- Philip Harrison (1904–1906/07) : W. P. Harrison (Kent). Tours: New Zealand (1906/07).
- Hugh Harrison (1896–1897) : H. R. E. Harrison (MCC)
- **John Harry** (1896) : J. Harry (Victoria)
- **Jock Hartley** (1903–1926) : J. C. Hartley (Sussex). Tours: South Africa (1905/06); Australia & New Zealand (1922/23).
- Eric Hatfeild (1911/12) : C. E. Hatfeild (Kent). Tours: South America (1911/12).
- **Ernie Hayes** (1905/06–1907/08) : E. G. Hayes (Surrey). Tours: South Africa (1905/06); Australia (1907/08).
- Herbert Hayman (1896–1901) : H. B. Hayman (Middlesex)
- **Tom Hayward** (1903/04) : T. W. Hayward (Surrey). Tours: Australia (1903/04).
- Cecil Headlam (1903–1908) : C. Headlam (Middlesex)
- **J. W. Hearne** (1910/11–1935) : J. W. Hearne (Middlesex). Tours: West Indies (1910/11); Australia (1911/12); South Africa (1913/14); Australia (1920/21); Australia (1924/25).
- Thomas Henderson (1899–1901) : T. B. Henderson (Oxford University)
- **Patsy Hendren** (1908–1937) : E. H. Hendren (Middlesex). Tours: Australia (1920/21); Australia (1924/25); Australia (1928/29); West Indies (1929/30); South Africa (1930/31); West Indies (1934/35).
- Francis Henley (1905) : F. A. H. Henley (Middlesex). Tours: North America (1905).
- Mervyn Herbert (1909) : M. R. H. M. Herbert (Nottinghamshire)
- George Heron (1899) : G. A. Heron (MCC)
- Hesketh Hesketh-Prichard (1904–1913) : H. V. Hesketh-Prichard (Hampshire). Tours: North America (1907).
- Thomas Higson (1904) : T. A. Higson (Derbyshire, Lancashire)
- Herbert Hill (1900–1901) : H. J. Hill (Hertfordshire)
- **George Hirst** (1903/04) : G. H. Hirst (Yorkshire). Tours: Australia (1903/04).
- **Bill Hitch** (1911/12–1920/21) : J. W. Hitch (Surrey). Tours: Australia (1911/12); Australia (1920/21).
- Arthur Hoare (1903) : A. R. Hoare (Norfolk)
- **Jack Hobbs** (1907/08–1928/29) : J. B. Hobbs (Surrey). Tours: Australia (1907/08); South Africa (1909/10); Australia (1911/12); South Africa (1913/14); Australia (1920/21); Australia (1924/25); Australia (1928/29).
- William Holbech (1908–1909) : W. H. Holbech (Warwickshire)
- Bernard Holloway (1910/11–1914) : B. H. Holloway (Sussex). Tours: West Indies (1910/11).
- William Holloway (1900–1902) : W. O. Holloway (Sussex)
- Charles Hooman (1910) : C. V. L. Hooman (Kent)
- John Hopley (1905) : F. J. V. Hopley (Cambridge University). Tours: North America (1905).
- A. H. Hornby (1899) : A. H. Hornby (Lancashire)
- Thomas Horton (1900–1904) : T. Horton (Northamptonshire)
- Gerald Howard-Smith (1900–1902) : G. Howard-Smith (Staffordshire)
- Jack Hubble (1908–1929) : J. C. Hubble (Kent). Tours: South Africa (1927/28).
- Fred Huish (1896–1912) : F. H. Huish (Kent)
- Charles Hulls (1896) : C. H. Hulls (Somerset)
- Campbell Hulton (1903) : C. B. Hulton
- John Hulton (1903–1905) : J. M. Hulton (MCC)
- Punter Humphreys (1912/13) : E. Humphreys (Kent). Tours: West Indies (1912/13).
- **Joe Humphries** (1904–1914) : J. Humphries (Derbyshire). Tours: Australia (1907/08).
- Kenneth Hunter (1905) : K. O. Hunter (MCC). Tours: North America (1905).
- Christopher Hurst (1913) : C. S. Hurst (Kent)
- Frederick Hutchings (1905) : F. V. Hutchings (Kent)
- **Kenneth Hutchings** (1907/08–1912) : K. L. Hutchings (Kent). Tours: Australia (1907/08).

== I ==
- John Frederick Ireland (1912) : J. F. Ireland (Cambridge University)
- James Iremonger (1911/12) : J. Iremonger (Nottinghamshire). Tours: Australia (1911/12).
- George Cecil Ives (1902) : G. C. Ives (MCC)

== J ==
- Arthur Jaques (1912/13) : A. Jaques (Hampshire). Tours: West Indies (1912/13).
- Malcolm Jardine (1897) : M. R. Jardine (Oxford University, Middlesex)
- Digby Jephson (1895) : D. L. A. Jephson (Cambridge University, Surrey)
- William Jephson (1908–1920) : W. V. Jephson (Hampshire)
- **Gilbert Jessop** (1896–1914) : G. L. Jessop (Gloucestershire)
- Peter Randall Johnson (1906–1923) : P. R. Johnson (Somerset). Tours: New Zealand (1906/07).
- Alexander Johnston (1911–1920) : A. C. Johnston (Hampshire)
- **Arthur Jones** (1899–1907/08) : A. O. Jones (Nottinghamshire). Tours: Australia (1907/08).

== K ==
- Harold Kaye (1908) : H. S. Kaye (Yorkshire)
- R. P. Keigwin (1911–1919) : R. P. Keigwin (Essex, Gloucestershire)
- Gus Kelly (1912) : G. W. F. B. Kelly (Oxford University, Ireland)
- Leslie Kidd (1914–1928) : E. L. Kidd (Middlesex, Ireland)
- **John King** (1899–1925) : J. H. King (Leicestershire)
- Henry King (1895) : H. C. King (MCC)
- **Septimus Kinneir** (1911/12) : S. Kinneir (Warwickshire). Tours: Australia (1911/12).
- **Albert Knight** (1903/04) : A. E. Knight (Leicestershire, London County). Tours: Australia (1903/04).
- Arthur Knowles (1895–1896) : A. Knowles (Lancashire)

== L ==
- Godfrey Lagden (1905/06) : G. Y. Lagden (MCC). Tours: South Africa (1905/06).
- Reginald Lambert (1904) : R. E. Lambert (Sussex)
- Roger Latham (1900) : R. D. Latham
- Albert Lawton (1905–1914) : A. E. Lawton (Derbyshire, Lancashire)
- Edward Lee (1901–1909) : E. C. Lee (Hampshire)
- **Harry Lee** (1914–1934) : H. W. Lee (Middlesex). Tours: South Africa (1930/31).
- **Walter Lees** (1905/06) : W. S. Lees (Surrey). Tours: South Africa (1905/06).
- Charles Leese (1908–1911) : C. P. Leese (Lancashire)
- Neville Leese (1895) : N. Leese (MCC)
- Alfred Legard (1904–1910) : A. D. Legard (Yorkshire)
- James Leigh (1900) : J. Leigh (Lancashire)
- Frederick Leveson Gower (1895–1901) : F. A. G. Leveson-Gower (Hampshire)
- **H. D. G. Leveson Gower** (1898–1930) : H. D. G. Leveson-Gower (Surrey). Tours: South Africa (1905/06); South Africa (1909/10).
- Richard Lewis (1898–1903) : R. P. Lewis (Middlesex)
- Frederick Lewis (1903) : F. S. Lewis (MCC)
- Gerald Liddlelow (1910/11) : G. B. M. Liddlelow (Trinidad). Tours: West Indies (1910/11).
- Fitzhardinge Liebenrood (1905–1906) : F. H. Liebenrood (MCC)
- **Dick Lilley** (1903/04) : A. F. A. Lilley (Warwickshire, London County). Tours: Australia (1903/04).
- Arthur Litteljohn (1912) : A. R. Litteljohn (Middlesex)
- **Charlie Llewellyn** (1903–1910) : C. B. Llewellyn (Natal, Hampshire, London County)
- Arthur Lupton (1909) : A. W. Lupton (Yorkshire)
- Charles Luther (1908–1911) : A. C. G. Luther (Sussex)
- Charles Frederick Lyttelton (1910) : C. F. Lyttelton (Cambridge University, Worcestershire)

== M ==
- **Archie MacLaren** (1896–1922/23) : A. C. MacLaren (Lancashire). Tours: South America (1911/12); Australia & New Zealand (1922/23).
- K. G. MacLeod (1911) : K. G. MacLeod (Lancashire)
- Sir Christopher Magnay, 3rd Baronet (1906–1909) : C. B. W. Magnay (Middlesex)
- Harry Mallett (1901) : R. H. Mallett (Durham)
- Eric W. Mann (1905) : E. W. Mann (Cambridge University, Kent). Tours: North America (1905).
- Oliver Marks (1901) : O. Marks (MCC)
- Harold Marriott (1903–1919) : H. H. Marriott (Leicestershire)
- C. H. B. Marsham (1903–1908) : C. H. B. Marsham (Kent)
- Francis Bullock-Marsham (1905) : F. W. B. Marsham (Kent)
- **Jack Mason** (1902) : J. R. Mason (Kent)
- Charles Mason (1896) : C. E. S. Mason (MCC)
- **Hugh Massie** (1895) : H. H. Massie (New South Wales)
- Percy May (1906/07–1910) : P. R. May (London County, Surrey). Tours: New Zealand (1906/07).
- Frank May (1898–1906) : F. B. May (MCC)
- Pat McCormick (1907) : W. P. G. McCormick
- Harold McDonell (1905) : H. C. McDonell (Surrey, Hampshire). Tours: North America (1905).
- **Charlie McGahey** (1897) : C. P. McGahey (Essex, London County)
- Colin McIver (1903–1934) : C. D. McIver (Essex)
- **Phil Mead** (1910–1928/29) : C. P. Mead (Hampshire). Tours: Australia (1911/12); South Africa (1913/14); South Africa (1922/23); Australia (1928/29).
- Walter Medlicott (1903–1911) : W. S. Medlicott (Oxford University)
- Philip Meldon (1911) : P. A. Meldon (MCC)
- Edward Mignon (1908–1914) : E. Mignon (Middlesex)
- **Audley Miller** (1896–1903) : A. M. Miller (MCC)
- **Frank Milligan** (1897) : F. W. Milligan (Yorkshire)
- **Frank Mitchell** (1897–1914) : F. Mitchell (Yorkshire, London County)
- Hugh Montgomery (1908) : H. F. Montgomery (MCC)
- **Leonard Moon** (1905–1909) : L. J. Moon (Middlesex). Tours: North America (1905); South Africa (1905/06).
- Harry Moorhouse (1901–1905) : H. C. Moorhouse (MCC)
- Edward Morant (1895) : E. J. H. E. Morant (MCC)
- Alfred Morcom (1911) : A. F. Morcom (Cambridge University)
- Gerald Mordaunt (1897–1898) : G. J. Mordaunt (Oxford University, Kent)
- Sir Henry Mordaunt, 12th Baronet (1896) : H. J. Mordaunt (Hampshire, Middlesex)
- Richard More (1905) : R. E. More (Middlesex)
- Arthur Morton (1912–1920) : A. Morton (Derbyshire)
- Francis Mugliston (1910) : F. H. Mugliston (Cambridge University, Lancashire)
- Joe Murrell (1901–1919) : H. R. Murrell (Kent, Middlesex)

== N ==
- Guy Napier (1904–1913) : G. G. Napier (Middlesex). Tours: North America (1905).
- George Neale (1902) : G. H. Neale (MCC)
- Arthur Newman (1909–1923) : A. W. Newman (Wiltshire)
- John Newstead (1904–1906) : J. T. Newstead (Yorkshire)
- Kenneth Nicholl (1913) : K. I. Nicholl (Middlesex)
- Benjamin Nicholls (1901) : B. E. Nicholls (Sussex)
- Richard Nicholls (1896–1903) : R. W. Nicholls (Middlesex)
- Percy Northcote (1895–1903) : P. Northcote (Middlesex)

== O ==
- Thomas Oates (1900–1908) : T. W. Oates (Nottinghamshire)
- William Oates (1895) : W. C. Oates (Nottinghamshire)
- Donough O'Brien (1906) : D. O'Brien (MCC)
- James O'Halloran (1897–98) : J. P. O'Halloran (Victoria)
- David Osborne (1913–1914) : D. R. Osborne (Middlesex)
- William Overton (1898–1908) : W. Overton (Wiltshire)

== P ==
- Arthur Page (1898–1904) : A. Page (Oxford University)
- Charles Page (1906/07) : C. C. Page (Middlesex). Tours: New Zealand (1906/07).
- **Lionel Palairet** (1902) : L. C. H. Palairet (Somerset)
- Clayton Palmer (1908–1909) : C. Palmer (Middlesex)
- William Parker (1913) : W. M. Parker (MCC)
- Cecil Payne (1905–1909) : C. A. L. Payne (Middlesex)
- Meyrick Payne (1905–1925) : M. W. Payne (Middlesex). Tours: North America (1905).
- William Payne-Gallwey (1912) : W. T. Payne-Gallwey (MCC)
- Horace Peacock (1896–1899) : H. O. Peacock (Lincolnshire)
- **Sid Pegler** (1914–1930) : S. J. Pegler (Transvaal)
- Eric Penn (1898–1903) : E. F. Penn (Norfolk)
- Edward Pereira (1900) : E. T. Pereira (Warwickshire)
- Thomas Perks (1902) : T. Perks (MCC)
- Percy Perrin (1901–1912) : P. A. Perrin (Essex)
- Frank Phillips (1896) : F. A. Phillips (Somerset)
- Noel Phillips (1908) : N. C. Phillips (Monmouthshire)
- Arthur Pike (1901) : A. Pike (Nottinghamshire)
- Charles Pilkington (1899) : C. C. Pilkington (Lancashire, Middlesex)
- Cecil Ponsonby (1914) : C. B. Ponsonby (Worcestershire)
- Richard Ponsonby-Fane (1909/10) : R. A. B. Ponsonby (MCC). Tours: South Africa (1909/10).
- **Robert Poore** (1898) : R. M. Poore (Hampshire)
- Arthur Priestley (1895) : A. Priestley (MCC)
- Hugh Priestley (1911) : H. W. Priestley (Buckinghamshire)

== R ==
- Arthur Rammell (1896) : A. W. Rammell
- James Randall (1904) : J. Randall
- John Raphael (1905–1913) : J. E. Raphael (London County, Surrey)
- Cyril Rattigan (1908) : C. S. Rattigan (Cambridge University)
- Bill Reeves (1906–1920) : W. Reeves (Essex)
- Leo Reid (1913) : L. J. Reid (Cambridgeshire, Hertfordshire)
- **Albert Relf** (1900–1914) : A. E. Relf (Sussex). Tours: Australia (1903/04); South Africa (1905/06); West Indies (1912/13); South Africa (1913/14).
- Robert Relf (1910–1914) : R. R. Relf (Sussex). Tours: South Africa (1913/14).
- Alan Reynolds (1903) : A. B. Reynolds (Oxford University, Gentlemen, Hertfordshire)
- **Wilfred Rhodes** (1903/04–1929/30) : W. Rhodes (Yorkshire). Tours: Australia (1903/04); Australia (1907/08); South Africa (1909/10); Australia (1911/12); South Africa (1913/14); Australia (1920/21); West Indies (1929/30).
- Ernest Rivett-Carnac (1900) : E. H. Rivett-Carnac (MCC)
- Douglas Robinson (1911–1919) : D. C. Robinson (Gloucestershire)
- Mickey Roche (1897–1900) : W. Roche (Victoria, Middlesex)
- Epifanio Rodriguez (1900) : C. E. Rodriguez (MCC)
- Thomas Russell (1897–1902) : T. M. Russell (Essex)

== S ==
- George Sandeman (1914) : G. A. C. Sandeman (Hampshire)
- William Sarel (1914) : W. G. M. Sarel (Kent)
- **Reggie Schwarz** (1901–1907) : R. O. Schwarz (Transvaal). Tours: North America (1907).
- William Scott (1895) : W. J. Scott (Middlesex)
- Cyril Sewell (1896–1912) : C. O. H. Sewell (Gloucestershire)
- E. H. D. Sewell (1911–1922) : E. H. D. Sewell (MCC)
- **George Shepstone** (1904) : G. H. Shepstone (Transvaal)
- **Percy Sherwell** (1907) : P. W. Sherwell (Transvaal)
- Eustace Shine (1896) : E. B. Shine (Kent)
- Leonard Shuter (1908) : L. R. W. A. Shuter (MCC)
- Harry Simms (1912) : H. L. Simms (Sussex)
- Christopher Simpson (1910/11) : C. O. Simpson (British Guiana). Tours: West Indies (1910/11).
- **George Simpson-Hayward** (1906/07–1909/10) : G. H. T. Simpson-Hayward (Worcestershire). Tours: New Zealand (1906/07); North America (1907); South Africa (1909/10).
- Razor Smith (1912/13) : W. C. Smith (Surrey). Tours: West Indies (1912/13).
- Sydney Smith (1910/11–1912/13) : S. G. Smith (Northamptonshire). Tours: West Indies (1910/11); West Indies (1912/13).
- **Tiger Smith** (1909–1925/26) : E. J. Smith (Warwickshire). Tours: Australia (1911/12); South Africa (1913/14); West Indies (1925/26).
- William Smith (1901–02) : W. R. R. Smith (Somerset, Wiltshire)
- **Tip Snooke** (1907–1912) : S. J. Snooke (Transvaal). Tours: North America (1907).
- Arthur Somers-Cocks (1906) : Lord Somers (MCC)
- Arthur Somerset junior (1910/11–1919) : A. P. F. C. Somerset (Sussex). Tours: West Indies (1910/11); West Indies (1912/13).
- Arthur Somerset senior (1899–1912/13) : A. W. F. Somerset (Sussex). Tours: West Indies (1910/11); West Indies (1912/13).
- **Reggie Spooner** (1904–1923) : R. H. Spooner (Lancashire)
- Henry Stanley (1897–1898) : H. T. Stanley (Somerset)
- John Stanning senior (1899) : J. Stanning senior (Lancashire)
- Allan Ivo Steel (1912) : A. I. Steel (Middlesex)
- John Stevens (1902) : J. E. Stevens (Wiltshire)
- Henry Stevenson (1901–1902) : H. J. Stevenson (MCC)
- Haldane Stewart (1897) : H. C. Stewart (Kent)
- Wilfred Stoddart (1899) : W. B. Stoddart (Lancashire)
- John Stogdon (1896) : J. H. Stogdon (Cambridge University)
- Vincent Stow (1905) : V. A. S. Stow (Oxford University). Tours: North America (1905).
- Henry Stratton (1904–1914) : H. D. Stratton (Staffordshire)
- **Bert Strudwick** (1903/04–1924/25) : H. Strudwick (Surrey). Tours: Australia (1903/04); South Africa (1909/10); Australia (1911/12); South Africa (1913/14); Australia (1920/21); Australia (1924/25).
- Pascoe Stuart (1906) : P. W. G. Stuart (London County)
- Reginald Swalwell (1914–1925) : R. S. Swalwell (Worcestershire)
- Richard Swann-Mason (1909–1914) : R. S. Swann-Mason (MCC)
- Frank Swinstead (1900) : F. H. Swinstead (MCC)
- Henry Symes-Thompson (1896–1906) : H. E. Symes-Thompson (MCC)

== T ==
- Noel Tagart (1901) : N. O. Tagart (Gloucestershire)
- Henry Talbot (1895) : H. L. Talbot (MCC)
- **Bernard Tancred** (1897) : A. B. Tancred (Transvaal)
- **Louis Tancred** (1904–1912) : L. J. Tancred (Transvaal)
- Ernest Tandy (1908) : E. N. Tandy (Somerset)
- Frank Tarrant (1903–1914) : F. A. Tarrant (Victoria, Middlesex)
- Edward Tate (1899–1902) : E. Tate (Hampshire)
- Tom Taylor (1899) : T. L. Taylor (Yorkshire)
- Edward Taylor-Jones (1901) : E. W. T. Taylor-Jones (Kent)
- Hugh Teesdale (1909–1910) : H. Teesdale (Surrey)
- **Lionel Tennyson, 3rd Baron Tennyson** (1913–1937) : L. H. Tennyson (Hampshire). Tours: South Africa (1913/14); West Indies (1925/26).
- **George Thompson** (1897–1914) : G. J. Thompson (Northamptonshire). Tours: South Africa (1909/10).
- Edmund Thomson (1913–1914) : E. P. Thomson (Wiltshire)
- **George Thornton** (1896–1899) : G. Thornton (Yorkshire, Middlesex)
- Sidney Tindall (1899–1900) : S. M. Tindall (Lancashire, London County)
- Attwood Torrens (1906/07) : A. A. Torrens (MCC). Tours: New Zealand (1906/07).
- **Charlie Townsend** (1899–1905) : C. L. Townsend (Gloucestershire)
- Geoffrey Toynbee (1912) : G. P. R. Toynbee (Hampshire)
- Bert Tremlin (1911) : B. Tremlin (Essex)
- **Albert Trott** (1896–1911) : A. E. Trott (Victoria, Middlesex)
- Lionel Troughton (1911/12–1919) : L. H. W. Troughton (Kent). Tours: South America (1911/12).
- **Neville Tufnell** (1906/07–1919) : N. C. Tufnell (Cambridge University, Surrey). Tours: New Zealand (1906/07); South Africa (1909/10); South America (1911/12).
- John Tufton, 2nd Baron Hothfield (1897–1899) : J. S. R. Tufton (Kent)
- Lennox Turner (1896) : L. J. Turner
- Richard Twining (1914–1919) : R. H. Twining (Middlesex)
- **Johnny Tyldesley** (1903/04) : J. T. Tyldesley (Lancashire). Tours: Australia (1903/04).

== U ==
- Robin Udal (1914) : N. R. Udal (Oxford University)

== V ==
- Casimir Cartwright van Straubenzee (1899) : C. C. van Straubenzee (MCC)
- Philip Vanderbyl (1900) : P. B. Vanderbyl (MCC)
- Charles Veal (1906–1910) : C. L. Veal (Glamorgan)
- **Joe Vine** (1911/12) : J. Vine (Sussex). Tours: Australia (1911/12).
- **Bert Vogler** (1905–1906) : A. E. E. Vogler (Transvaal)

== W ==
- Walker Wainwright (1904) : W. Wainwright (Yorkshire)
- Benjamin Wallach (1902) : B. Wallach (London County)
- Gerald Ward (1903) : G. E. F. Ward (MCC)
- Harold Watson (1913–21) : H. Watson (Norfolk)
- Hugh Watson (1908) : H. D. R. Watson (MCC)
- John Watson (1902–03) : J. T. Watson (MCC)
- Bruce Wentworth (1897–1900) : B. C. V. Wentworth (MCC)
- William White (1908) : W. N. White (Hampshire)
- James Whitehead (1912) : J. H. E. Whitehead (Kent)
- Tom Whittington (1910/11–1913) : T. A. L. Whittington (Glamorgan). Tours: West Indies (1910/11); West Indies (1912/13).
- Clive Wigram (1897) : C. Wigram (MCC)
- Alexander Wilkinson (1914–1939) : W. A. C. Wilkinson (MCC). Tours: Australia & New Zealand (1922/23).
- Billy Williams (1901) : W. Williams (Middlesex)
- Joseph Williams (1914) : J. Williams (Cheshire)
- Philip Williams (1906/07) : P. F. C. Williams (Dorset). Tours: New Zealand (1906/07).
- **Clem Wilson** (1898–1900) : C. E. M. Wilson (Yorkshire)
- Francis Wilson (1914) : F. T. D. Wilson (MCC)
- **Rockley Wilson** (1902–1920/21) : E. R. Wilson (Yorkshire). Tours: South America (1911/12); Australia (1920/21).
- Arthur Woodcock (1895–1901) : A. Woodcock (Leicestershire)
- **Frank Woolley** (1909/10–1929/30) : F. E. Woolley (Kent). Tours: South Africa (1909/10); Australia (1911/12); South Africa (1913/14); Australia (1920/21); South Africa (1922/23); Australia (1924/25); Australia & New Zealand (1929/30).
- John Wormald (1912) : J. Wormald (Middlesex)
- Arthur Worsley (1904) : A. E. Worsley (Oxford University)
- Harry Wrathall (1896–1907) : H. Wrathall (Gloucestershire)
- Egerton Wright (1909) : E. L. Wright (Lancashire)
- Harold Wright (1914) : H. Wright (Leicestershire)
- Hugh Wyld (1900–1905) : H. J. Wyld (Oxford University). Tours: North America (1905).

== Y ==
- **Dick Young** (1907/08) : R. A. Young (Sussex). Tours: Australia (1907/08).
- **Sailor Young** (1899–1910/11) : H. I. Young (Essex). Tours: West Indies (1910/11).

== See also ==
- Lists of Marylebone Cricket Club players
