= 1911 English cricket season =

1911 was the 22nd season of County Championship cricket in England. Warwickshire were champions for the first time.

== Honours ==
- County Championship – Warwickshire
- Minor Counties Championship – Staffordshire
- Wisden (Five Members of the MCC's Team in Australia) – Frank Foster, J. W. Hearne, Sep Kinneir, Phil Mead, Bert Strudwick

== County Championship ==
The experimental point scoring system adopted for 1910 on the recommendation of Lancashire was generally regarded as unsatisfactory. Several alternative proposals were put forward by counties such as Yorkshire Sussex, and Surrey. Ultimately Somerset in February 1911 put forward a scheme in which, for the first time, points were awarded for a win on the first innings, and this was accepted by the MCC in the final week of that month.

| | County | Played | Won | Lost | First Innings | | | Points | | % |
| | County | Played | Won | Lost | Won | Lost | No result | Poss | Obtd | % |
|---|---|---|---|---|---|---|---|---|---|---|
| 1 | Warwickshire | 20 | 13 | 4 | 3 | 0 | 0 | 100 | 74 | 74.00 |
| 2 | Kent | 26 | 17 | 4 | 3 | 2 | 0 | 130 | 96 | 73.84 |
| 3 | Middlesex | 22 | 14 | 5 | 3 | 0 | 0 | 110 | 79 | 71.81 |
| 4 | Lancashire | 30 | 15 | 7 | 5 | 3 | 0 | 150 | 93 | 62.00 |
| 5 | Surrey | 30 | 15 | 7 | 4 | 4 | 0 | 150 | 91 | 60.66 |
| 6 | Essex | 18 | 8 | 5 | 4 | 1 | 0 | 90 | 53 | 58.88 |
| 7 | Yorkshire | 28 | 14 | 8 | 1 | 4 | 1 | 135 | 77 | 57.03 |
| 8 | Nottinghamshire | 20 | 9 | 5 | 3 | 3 | 0 | 100 | 57 | 57.00 |
| 9 | Worcestershire | 24 | 12 | 11 | 0 | 1 | 0 | 120 | 61 | 50.83 |
| 10 | Northamptonshire | 18 | 8 | 9 | 0 | 0 | 1 | 85 | 40 | 47.05 |
| 11 | Hampshire | 24 | 7 | 10 | 4 | 3 | 0 | 120 | 50 | 41.66 |
| 12 | Gloucestershire | 20 | 5 | 12 | 0 | 3 | 0 | 100 | 38 | 38.00 |
| 13 | Sussex | 24 | 4 | 16 | 2 | 2 | 0 | 120 | 28 | 23.33 |
| 14 | Derbyshire | 18 | 2 | 13 | 0 | 3 | 0 | 90 | 13 | 14.44 |
| 15 | Leicestershire | 22 | 1 | 16 | 2 | 3 | 0 | 110 | 14 | 12.72 |
| 16 | Somerset | 16 | 1 | 13 | 0 | 2 | 0 | 80 | 7 | 8.75 |
Details as recorded in John Wisden’s Cricketers’ Almanack

- Five points were awarded for a win.
- Three points were awarded for "winning" the first innings of a drawn match.
- One point was awarded for "losing" the first innings of a drawn match.
- Matches in which no result was achieved on the first innings were not included in calculating maximum possible points.
- Final placings were decided by calculating the percentage of possible points.

== Minor Counties Championship ==
For this season, the Yorkshire and Nottinghamshire Second Elevens withdrew from the competition due to their counties' financial difficulties; however, Kent Second Eleven joined the South and West division and Hertfordshire moved to the North and East.

=== North and East ===
| | County | Played | Won | First Innings | | | Points | | % |
| | County | Played | Won | Won | Lost | No Result | Possible | Obtained | % |
|---|---|---|---|---|---|---|---|---|---|
| 1 | Staffordshire | 8 | 7 | 0 | 0 | 0 | 40 | 35 | 87.50 |
| 2 | Durham | 10 | 7 | 0 | 1 | 0 | 50 | 36 | 72.00 |
| 3 | Bedfordshire | 8 | 3 | 3 | 0 | 0 | 40 | 24 | 60.00 |
| 4 | Hertfordshire | 10 | 5 | 0 | 2 | 0 | 50 | 27 | 54.00 |
| 5 | Cambridgeshire | 10 | 3 | 2 | 3 | 0 | 50 | 24 | 48.00 |
| 6 | Northumberland | 8 | 3 | 1 | 0 | 0 | 40 | 18 | 45.00 |
| 7 | Suffolk | 8 | 2 | 2 | 0 | 0 | 40 | 16 | 40.00 |
| 8 | Lincolnshire | 10 | 3 | 1 | 0 | 0 | 50 | 16 | 36.00 |
| 9 | Norfolk | 12 | 2 | 1 | 3 | 0 | 60 | 16 | 26.66 |
| 10 | Cheshire | 8 | 1 | 0 | 1 | 0 | 40 | 6 | 15.00 |

=== South and West ===
| | County | Played | Won | First Innings | | | Points | | % |
| | County | Played | Won | Won | Lost | No Result | Possible | Obtained | % |
|---|---|---|---|---|---|---|---|---|---|
| 1 | Berkshire | 10 | 9 | 0 | 0 | 1 | 45 | 45 | 100.00 |
| 2 | Surrey Second Eleven | 8 | 6 | 1 | 0 | 0 | 40 | 33 | 82.50 |
| 3 | Kent Second Eleven | 10 | 8 | 0 | 0 | 0 | 50 | 40 | 80.00 |
| 4 | Glamorgan | 10 | 7 | 1 | 0 | 0 | 50 | 38 | 76.00 |
| 5 | Monmouthshire | 8 | 4 | 1 | 1 | 0 | 40 | 24 | 60.00 |
| 6 | Dorset | 8 | 1 | 3 | 1 | 0 | 40 | 15 | 37.50 |
| 7 | Buckinghamshire | 10 | 2 | 1 | 2 | 0 | 50 | 15 | 30.00 |
| 8 | Devon | 10 | 2 | 0 | 3 | 0 | 50 | 13 | 26.00 |
| 9 | Cornwall | 8 | 2 | 0 | 0 | 0 | 40 | 10 | 25.00 |
| 10 | Wiltshire | 10 | 0 | 1 | 1 | 0 | 50 | 4 | 8.00 |
| 11 | Carmarthenshire | 8 | 0 | 0 | 0 | 1 | 35 | 0 | 0.00 |

=== South and West Challenge Match ===
Because Berkshire had not played Surrey Second Eleven, the new rules required a challenge match.

23 August 1911

| Berkshire | v | Surrey Second Eleven |
| 87 | | 80 |
| 210 | | 219/5; Harrison 68, G.W. Palmer 64 |

Surrey Second Eleven won by five wickets
Reading

- Berkshire won the toss and decided to bat

=== Final ===
30 August 1911

| Staffordshire | v | Surrey Second Eleven |
| 289; Nichols 61, B. Meakin 50, Hollywood 45; Abel 4/99 | | 83 Barnes 4/31, Nicholls 3/31 |
| 255; B. Meakin 133; Abel 5/65 | | 127; Spring 34; Barnes 6/43 |

Staffordshire won by 334 runs
County Ground, Stoke-on-Trent

- Staffordshire won the toss and decided to bat.
- Staffordshire did not enforce the follow-on

== Leading batsmen (qualification 20 innings) ==
1911 English season leading batsmen
| Name | Team | Matches | Innings | Not outs | Runs | Highest score | Average | 100s |
|---|---|---|---|---|---|---|---|---|
| C. B. Fry | Hampshire | 15 | 26 | 2 | 1728 | 258 not out | 72.00 | 7 |
| Phil Mead | Hampshire | 29 | 52 | 5 | 2562 | 223 | 54.51 | 9 |
| Reggie Spooner | Lancashire | 26 | 45 | 0 | 2312 | 224 | 51.37 | 7 |
| Percy Perrin | Essex | 15 | 27 | 2 | 1281 | 114 | 51.24 | 6 |
| Septimus Kinneir | Warwickshire | 20 | 36 | 3 | 1629 | 268 not out | 49.36 | 6 |
| Tom Hayward | Surrey | 30 | 51 | 6 | 2149 | 202 | 47.75 | 5 |
| Plum Warner | Middlesex MCC | 31 | 51 | 5 | 2123 | 244 | 46.15 | 5 |
| Frank Tarrant | Middlesex MCC | 29 | 48 | 4 | 2030 | 207 not out | 46.13 | 5 |
| Joe Hardstaff senior | Nottinghamshire | 21 | 40 | 6 | 1547 | 145 | 45.50 | 5 |
| Cecil Wood | Leicestershire | 23 | 44 | 7 | 1614 | 117 not out | 43.62 | 5 |

== Leading bowlers (qualification 1,000 balls) ==
1911 English season leading bowlers
| Name | Team | Matches | Balls bowled | Runs conceded | Wickets taken | Average | Best bowling | 5 wickets in innings | 10 wickets in match |
|---|---|---|---|---|---|---|---|---|---|
| Punter Humphreys | Kent | 29 | 1073 | 534 | 33 | 16.18 | 5/29 | 1 | 0 |
| George Thompson | Northamptonshire | 22 | 4415 | 1889 | 113 | 16.71 | 7/44 | 13 | 4 |
| William East | Northamptonshire | 17 | 2647 | 988 | 59 | 16.74 | 7/11 | 4 | 1 |
| Arthur Day | Kent | 12 | 1259 | 583 | 34 | 17.14 | 8/49 | 2 | 0 |
| Schofield Haigh | Yorkshire | 31 | 4047 | 1684 | 97 | 17.36 | 7/20 | 2 | 0 |
| Harry Dean | Lancashire | 28 | 7781 | 3191 | 183 | 17.43 | 9/109 | 15 | 3 |
| J.T. Hearne | Middlesex; MCC | 24 | 6246 | 2134 | 122 | 17.49 | 7/33 | 7 | 0 |
| Arthur Litteljohn | Middlesex | 7 | 2011 | 904 | 51 | 17.72 | 8/69 | 5 | 2 |
| Douglas Carr | Kent | 9 | 1818 | 985 | 55 | 17.90 | 8/67 | 4 | 2 |
| John Evans | Oxford University; Hampshire | 9 | 1308 | 575 | 32 | 17.96 | 7/50 | 2 | 1 |

== Annual reviews ==
- John Wisden's Cricketers' Almanack, 1912
