= Malcolm Carlisle =

English cricketer and British Army officer (1884–1906)

Personal information
- Full name: Malcolm Methven Carlisle
- Born: 5 July 1884; Lymm, Cheshire, England
- Died: 24 May 1906 (aged 21); Lucknow, United Provinces, British India
- Batting: Right-handed
- Bowling: Unknown
- Relatives: Kenneth Carlisle senior (brother); Frederick Carlisle (uncle); Kenneth Carlisle junior (nephew)

Domestic team information
- Years: Team
- 1904: Marylebone Cricket Club

Career statistics
Competition	First-class
Matches	1
Runs scored	12
Batting average	6.00
100s/50s	–/–
Top score	12
Balls bowled	48
Wickets	0
Bowling average	–
5 wickets in innings	–
10 wickets in match	–
Best bowling	–
Catches/stumpings	–/–
- Source: Cricinfo, 18 April 2021

Malcolm Methven Carlisle (5 July 1884 – 24 May 1906) was an English first-class cricketer and British Army officer.

The son of the Samuel Carlisle, he was born in July 1884 at the family home of Foxley Hall at Lymm, Cheshire. He was educated at Harrow School, where he was in both the cricket and football elevens. After completing his education, Carlisle decided on a career in the military and attended the Royal Military College, Sandhurst. He graduated into the Northumberland Fusiliers as a second lieutenant in January 1904. In June 1904, he made a single appearance in first-class cricket for the Marylebone Cricket Club (MCC) against Leicestershire at Lord's. Batting twice in the match, he made scores of 12 and 0, being run out in the MCC first innings and dismissed without scoring in their second innings by George Gill. With the ball, he bowled eight wicketless overs, with Leicestershire winning the match by an innings margin. While serving in British India he was promoted to lieutenant in February 1906. He died three months later in May at Lucknow, from orbital cellulitis, following fever. From a cricketing family, his brother Kenneth senior, uncle Frederick, and nephew Kenneth junior, all played first-class cricket.
