= David Osborne =

David or Dave Osborne may refer to:

- David Osborne (politician) (born 1964), American politician; Republican member of the Kentucky House of Representatives
- David Osborne (Montserrat politician), member of the Legislative Assembly of Montserrat
- David E. Osborne (born 1951), American author and former Al Gore advisor
- David Osborne (cricketer) (1879–1954), English cricketer
- Super Dave Osborne, a character created and played by comedian Bob Einstein

== See also ==
- David L. Osborn (1921–1994), American diplomat
- Dave Osborn (born 1943), American football player
- David Osbourne, a character on the Irish soap opera Fair City, portrayed by Matt Fraser
