= Tagart =

Tagart is a surname. Notable people with the surname include:

- Edward Tagart (1804–1858), English Unitarian minister
- Noel Tagart (1878–1913), English cricketer

== See also ==
- Taggart
- Tagert
