= Charles Luther =

Charles Luther may refer to:

- Charles Luther (sprinter) (1885–1962), Swedish sprinter
- Charles Luther (soldier) (1880–1961), English soldier and cricketer
