= George Druce (cricketer) =

English barrister and cricketer

Personal information
- Full name: George Druce
- Born: 10 May 1821; London, England
- Died: 15 April 1869 (aged 47); Denmark Hill, Surrey, England
- Relatives: Frank Druce (nephew); Walter Druce (nephew); Eliot Druce (nephew)

Domestic team information
- Years: Team
- 1842: Cambridge University

Career statistics
Competition	First-class
Matches	1
Runs scored	5
Batting average	5.00
100s/50s	0/0
Top score	5*
Catches/stumpings	0/–
- Source: Cricinfo, 24 March 2014

George Druce (10 May 1821 – 15 April 1869) was an English barrister. He was educated at Shrewsbury School and as a cricketer he played one first-class cricket match for Cambridge University against Marylebone Cricket Club (MCC) at Lord's in 1842. Druce scored five runs in his only first-class appearance.

His nephew Frank Druce played Test cricket for England, while two other nephews Walter Druce and Eliot Druce both played first-class cricket.

Druce had a very successful academic career at Cambridge University and became a prominent and highly respected lawyer. He was appointed a Queen's Counsel in 1866. He died at Denmark Hill, Surrey on 15 April 1869 when he fell from his horse.
