= Harry Pike =

English footballer

Herbert Pike (born 1863), known as Harry Pike, was an English footballer who played in the Football Alliance and FA Cup for Nottingham Forest.

Pike was a member of the Pike family from Keyworth which produced cricketers and footballers. These included Horace Pike and Arthur Pike. On 4 January 1890, Horace, Arthur and Harry all played in the same Nottingham Forest side in a home match against Sheffield Wednesday. Forest lost 3–1. He also scored the first ever goal at Goodison Park on 3 September 1892, in the tenth minute.
