= Shivajirao Gaekwad =

Indian first-class cricketer

Shivajirao Gaikwad
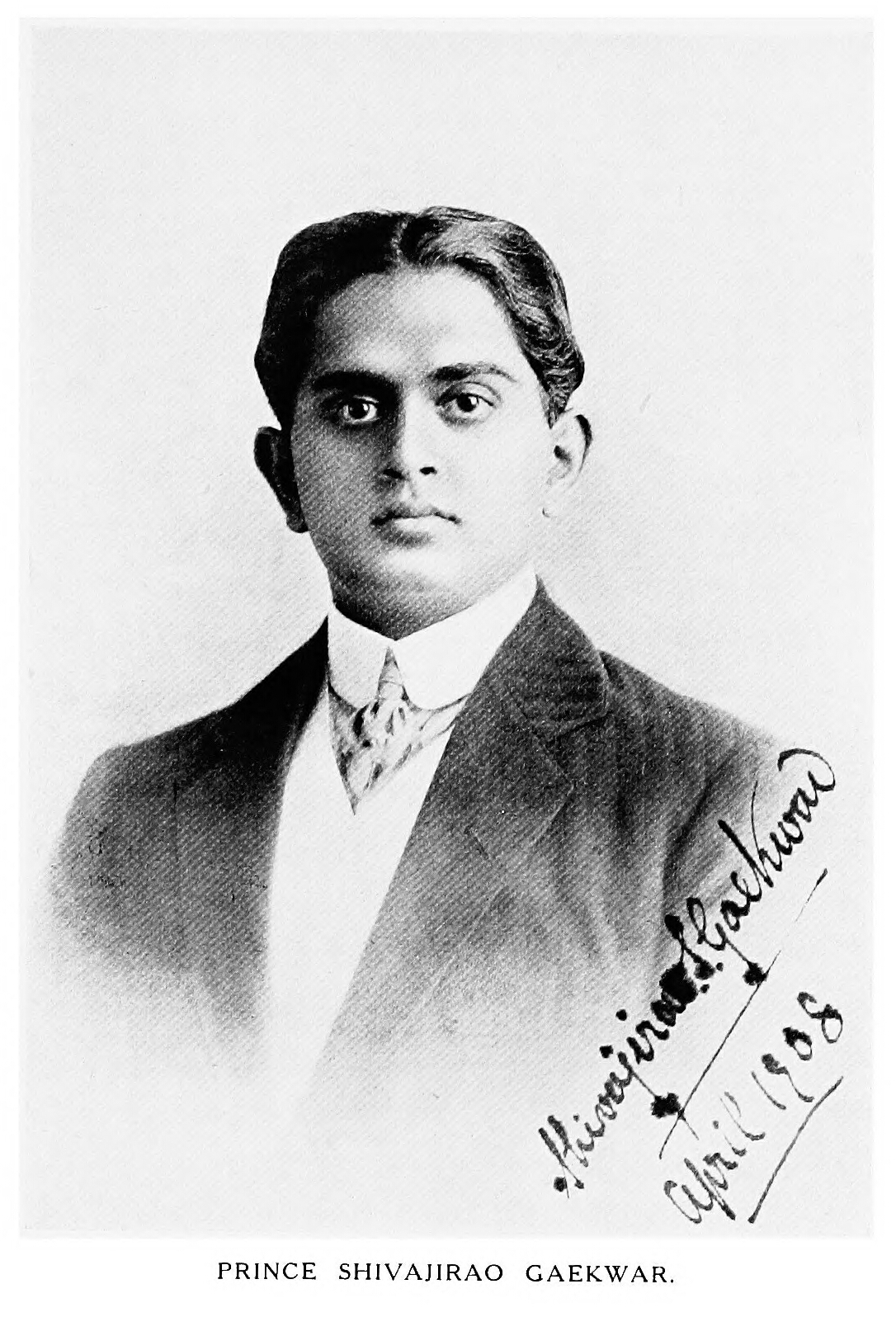

Personal information
- Full name: Shivajirao Gaekwad
- Born: 31 August 1890; Baroda, Gujarat, British India
- Died: 24 November 1919 (aged 29); Baroda, Gujarat, British India
- Batting: Right-handed
- Relatives: K. S. Gaekwar (son); Khanderao Gaekwar (son); Dhairyashilrao Gaekwad (brother); Jitendra Narayan (brother-in-law); Jagaddipendra Narayan (nephew); Fatehsinghrao Gaekwad (great-nephew); Ranjitsinh Gaekwad (great-nephew); Sangramsinh Gaekwad (great-nephew)

Domestic team information
- Years: Team
- 1911: Marylebone Cricket Club
- 1911–1913: Oxford University
- 1909/10: Hindus

Career statistics
Competition	First-class
Matches	14
Runs scored	406
Batting average	15.61
100s/50s	–/2
Top score	62
Catches/stumpings	4/1
- Source: Cricinfo, 6 October 2018

Maharajkumar Shivajirao Gaekwad (31 August 1890 – 24 November 1919) was an Indian first-class cricketer.

Born at Baroda in Gujarat in August 1890, to Maharaja Sayajirao Gaekwad III and his wife, Maharani Chimnabai. He is known to have attended Baroda College, and St. Xavier's College, Mumbai. He later continued his education in England, attending Christ Church at the University of Oxford. Prior to his education in England, Gaekwad had made his debut in first-class cricket for the Hindus against the Parsees at the Bombay Gymkhana in September 1909.

He played first-class cricket in England in 1910, when he played for the Gentlemen of England against Oxford University. The following year he made his debut for Oxford University in first-class matches, appearing against Surrey at Oxford, with Gaekwad playing for the university four times in 1911. 1911 proved to be a busy season of first-class cricket for Gaekwad, with one appearance for the Marylebone Cricket Club, which was followed by three appearances for the Indians against county opposition as part of their 1911 tour of the British Isles. He made two first-class appearances for Oxford University in 1912 against the touring South Africans and Australians. He made a final first-class appearance for the university in 1913, against HK Foster's XI.

Returning to India, Gaekwad made his final appearance in first-class cricket for a combined Hindus and Muslims team against a combined European and Parsees team. Across fourteen first-class appearances, he scored a total of 406 runs, averaging 15.61, with a high score of 62. This was one of two half centuries he made in first-class cricket. Gaekwad fell ill with pneumonia in 1919, as a result he was admitted to a clinic in Baroda for treatment. However, he never recovered from the illness and died in November 1919.

Gaekwad came from a large cricketing family, several of whom played at first-class level. This included his two sons, K. S. Gaekwar and Khanderao Gaekwar. He also had a daughter with his wife, Shrimant Akhand Soubhagyavati Maharajkumari Shakuntala Raje Gaekwad, who was the daughter of the Maharaja of Cooch-Behar.
