= Charles Barrow (cricketer) =

English cricketer, barrister, stockbroker, and British Army officer

Personal information
- Full name: Charles Deans Barrow
- Born: 4 April 1875; Paddington, Middlesex, England
- Died: 20 September 1944 (aged 69); Farmington, Gloucestershire, England
- Batting: Right-handed

Domestic team information
- Years: Team
- 1903: Marylebone Cricket Club

Career statistics
Competition	First-class
Matches	2
Runs scored	25
Batting average	12.50
100s/50s	–/–
Top score	25
Catches/stumpings	–/–
- Source: Cricinfo, 13 August 2021

Charles Deans Barrow (4 April 1875 – 20 September 1944) was an English first-class cricketer, British Army officer and landowner.

The son of John James Barrow, he was born at Paddington in April 1875. He was educated at Eton College, before going up to Lincoln College, Oxford. After graduating from Oxford, he was commissioned into the British Army as a second lieutenant in the Queen's Own Royal West Kent Regiment. He was promoted to lieutenant in May 1897, before being promoted to captain in April 1902. Barrow played first-class cricket for the Marylebone Cricket Club in 1903, making two appearances against London County and Derbyshire. He scored 25 runs in his two matches, with a high score of 12. He later served in the West Kent in the First World War, during which he held the rank of major and was promoted to the temporary rank of lieutenant colonel whilst commanding a battalion in April 1916. He was granted the rank in full in January 1917. Barrow lived out his later years in the Gloucestershire village of Farmington, having bought the entire village in 1901 and set up a quarry, which is still in operation as of 2026. Barrow died at his home in Farmington in September 1944 and was survived by his wife.
