= The Forty Club =

English cricket club

The Forty Club (XL) is a [UK] cricket club, established by Henry Grierson in 1936 and playing its first matches in 1937.

Grierson's original intention was to enable good players to enjoy cricket into middle age. In a letter to a prospective opponent in 1937 he explained who would play for the club: "Qualifications – over 40, good fellows, and useful cricketers. Professionals as well as amateurs. No sub., each paying his own exes." The first match was against Wellingborough School on 19 June 1937.

The club plays matches against schools with the aim of developing and encouraging cricket in schools. The players were originally required to be over 40 years old, although that was then reduced to 35 until the years 2013/14, where the age bar has been removed completely as a move to encourage all age groups. It is reputed to be the largest wandering cricket club in the world. The Duke of Edinburgh was the club's patron. Currently it enjoys some 140 fixtures against schools and youth XIs each season, plus a further 75 or 80 fixtures against clubs during the school holidays.
