= Fitzhardinge Liebenrood =

English cricketer and British Army officer

Personal information
- Full name: Fitzhardinge Hancock Liebenrood
- Born: 14 September 1885; Eltham, Kent, England
- Died: 11 May 1969 (aged 83); Poole, Dorset, England
- Batting: Unknown
- Bowling: Unknown
- Relatives: Harold Scott (son-in-law)

Domestic team information
- Years: Team
- 1905–1907: Marylebone Cricket Club

Career statistics
Competition	First-class
Matches	7
Runs scored	125
Batting average	11.36
100s/50s	–/–
Top score	26
Balls bowled	54
Wickets	2
Bowling average	22.00
5 wickets in innings	–
10 wickets in match	–
Best bowling	1/9
Catches/stumpings	6/–
- Source: Cricinfo, 28 April 2021

Fitzhardinge Hancock Liebenrood (14 September 1885 – 11 May 1969) was an English first-class cricketer and British Army officer.

Liebenrood was born at Eltham in September 1885 and was educated at Wellington College. He played first-class cricket for the Marylebone Cricket Club from 1905 to 1907, making seven appearances. He had limited success in his seven matches, scoring 125 runs at an average of 11.36 and a highest score of 26, in addition to taking 2 wickets. From Wellington he proceeded to join the British Army, being commissioned as a second lieutenant in the Queen's Own Royal West Kent Regiment in January 1904. He was promoted to lieutenant in June 1905, with promotion to captain following in August 1908.

Liebenrood served in the First World War, during which he was seconded to the training school of the Machine Gun Corps in September 1916 and was made a temporary major the following month. Later in the war, he was appointed to be an instructor at the School of Musketry at Hythe in November 1917, a position which he relinquished in December 1918. He abandoned the surname Libenrood in March 1922, simply being known as Fitzhardinge Hancock. He died at Poole in May 1969. His son-in-law was Harold Scott, a first-class cricketer for Sussex.
