= Horace Pike =

English footballer

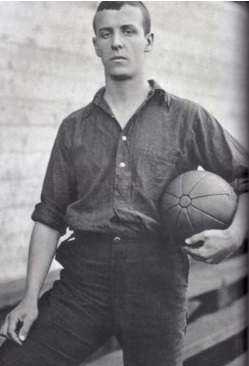

Personal information
- Full name: Horace Pike
- Date of birth: 17 December 1869
- Place of birth: Keyworth, England
- Date of death: 1936 (aged 66–67)
- Position: Winger

Senior career*
Years	Team	Apps	(Gls)
1885–1888	Keyworth		
1888–1892	Notts Swifts		
1892–1896	Nottingham Forest	91	(22)
1897–1900	Loughborough	66	(8)
1900–1901	Keyworth		
1902	Philadelphia & Reading Athletic		
- * Club domestic league appearances and goals

Horace Pike (17 December 1869 – 1936) was an English footballer who played in the Football League for Loughborough and Nottingham Forest.

Pike made his debut for Forest in the FA Cup second round replay against Chatham Town on 23 February 1889 which ended in a 2-2 draw. In the second replay 5 days later, Pike scored his first Forest goal.

He scored Forest's first ever goal in the Football League on 3 September 1892 in the 2–2 draw against Everton. That goal was also the first ever goal in a league game at Goodison Park.

Horace Pike was a member of the Pike family from Keyworth which produced cricketers and footballers. These included Harry Pike and Arthur Pike. On 4 January 1890, Horace, Arthur and Harry all played in the same Nottingham Forest side in a home match against Sheffield Wednesday. Forest lost 3-1.

Towards the end of his football career, Horace emigrated to the USA.
