= Frank Druce =

English cricketer

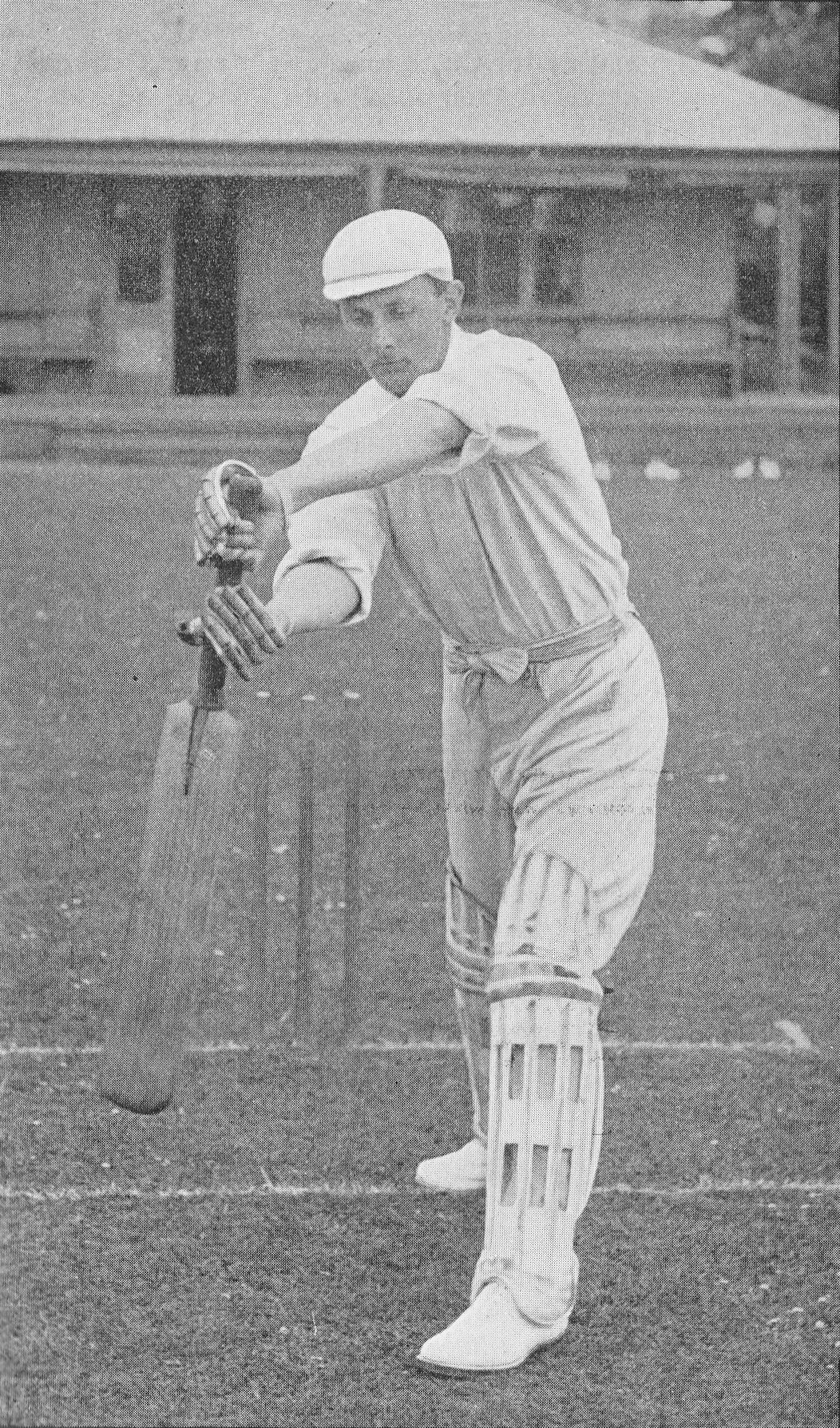
- Druce's off-drive, late 1890s

Personal information
- Full name: Norman Frank Druce
- Born: 1 January 1875; Denmark Hill, London
- Died: 27 October 1954 (aged 79); Milford-on-Sea, Hampshire
- Batting: Right-handed
- Relatives: Eliot Druce (cousin); Walter Druce (cousin); George Druce (uncle)

International information
- National side: England
- Test debut: 13 December 1897 v Australia
- Last Test: 26 February 1898 v Australia

Career statistics
Competition	Tests	First-class
Matches	5	66
Runs scored	252	3,416
Batting average	28.00	35.21
100s/50s	0/1	9/12
Top score	64	227*
Balls bowled	–	528
Wickets	–	8
Bowling average	–	33.50
5 wickets in innings	–	0
10 wickets in match	–	0
Best bowling	–	1/8
Catches/stumpings	5/–	66/–
- Source: , 30 May 2017

Norman Frank Druce, known as Frank Druce (1 January 1875 – 27 October 1954) was an English cricketer who played in five Test matches from 1897 to 1898. He is one of the very few Test cricketers to have made his claims for inclusion purely upon his performance for an Oxbridge university. He had played a few times for Surrey in 1895 and 1897, when the team was a powerful force in county cricket, but his performance was so modest that he had difficulty justifying his place.

== Life ==
Frank Druce was the son of Walter William Druce of Denmark Hill, London. He began his career in cricket with the Marlborough College eleven between 1891 and 1893, captaining them in his last season before moving to Trinity College, Cambridge in 1893. He achieved little for Cambridge in 1894, but in 1895, with very dry weather and firm pitches whilst University cricket was being played, he scored 786 runs in 17 innings for the university at an average of 56. He made an impressive 50 on a fiery pitch for the Gentlemen against an extremely strong Players attack (with Richardson, Mold and Peel prominent) at Lord's in July, but playing for Surrey in July and August that year Druce was a complete failure on a succession of sticky wickets - so much so that in seven matches he scored only 111 runs from ten innings.

In 1896, Druce again did well for Cambridge with the weather even drier than in the corresponding period of 1895. He was not available for Surrey after the University season ended, but in 1897, after being appointed captain of Cambridge University, he surpassed his 1895 form, averaging 66 an innings. Although he was again disappointing for Surrey later that year, his form was so good for the University that Wisden chose Druce as one of their Five Cricketers of the Year for 1898 and he toured Australia.

Although England were overwhelmed as bowlers like Richardson and Briggs lost form, Druce did not do badly, averaging 28 in his five Tests.

Although it was rumoured that Druce would play for Kent in 1898, it was, according to Wisden that year, thought that "very little will be seen of him in first-class cricket". In fact, Druce could not spare any time at all for county cricket as he moved into business, and though he played two more first-class matches for Marylebone Cricket Club (MCC) and H.D.G. Leveson Gower's XI in 1902 and 1909, his serious cricket had ended with his Ashes tour. However, his 152 for Free Foresters against Cambridge University as late as 1912 does suggest he would have done a good deal had he been able to play even occasionally.

Druce was a rather unorthodox batsman focused chiefly on hitting, and for his day his hitting on the leg-side was exceptional in quality. Although he was not a pure slogger, his defence on sticky wickets was not the equal of the best batsmen of his day, as shown in August 1895.
