= Eliot Druce =

English cricketer

Personal information
- Full name: Eliot Albert Cross Druce
- Born: 20 June 1876; Weybridge, Surrey
- Died: 24 October 1934 (aged 58); Brompton, London
- Batting: Right-handed
- Bowling: Right-arm medium
- Relatives: Frank Druce (cousin); Walter Druce (cousin); George Druce (uncle)

Domestic team information
- Years: Team
- 1897–1898: Cambridge University
- 1898–1900: Kent

Career statistics
Competition	First-class
Matches	10
Runs scored	185
Batting average	15.41
100s/50s	0/0
Top score	43
Balls bowled	371
Wickets	13
Bowling average	16.38
5 wickets in innings	0
10 wickets in match	0
Best bowling	4/28
Catches/stumpings	6/–
- Source: CricInfo, 23 March 2014

Eliot Albert Cross Druce (20 June 1876 – 24 October 1934) was an English amateur cricketer who played first-class cricket between 1897 and 1913. He was born at Weybridge in Surrey, the son of Albert Druce, and grew up at Thornhill in Sevenoaks in Kent.

== Education ==
Druce attended The Beacon, now called New Beacon, in Sevenoaks, Marlborough School and then went up to Trinity College, Cambridge in 1895. He took a law degree, graduating in 1898 and becoming a solicitor in 1901. He was later employed in the offices of the Duchy of Lancaster.

== Cricketing career ==
Druce did not play for the Marlborough cricket team but made his first-class cricket debut for Cambridge University against Marylebone Cricket Club (MCC) at Lord's in 1897. He played a total of three matches for the university and was awarded a hockey Blue in 1898.

He played one match for MCC against Cambridge in 1898, before making an appearance for Kent County Cricket Club in the 1898 County Championship against Sussex at Catford. He played twice more for Kent in the 1900 County Championship and over a decade later he made three first-class appearances for Free Foresters in matches against Oxford University and Cambridge University. Druce also played a number of minor matches for Kent Second XI, MCC and Fee Foresters, appearing as late as 1925 for MCC.

== Later life ==
Druce married Elizabeth Swann, the daughter of Sir Charles Swann on 16 September 1913. He died suddenly at Brompton, London in October 1934 aged 58. His cousin Frank Druce played Test cricket for England, while another cousin Walter Druce and his uncle George Druce both played first-class cricket.

== Bibliography ==
- Carlaw, Derek (2020). Kent County Cricketers, A to Z: Part One (1806–1914) (PDF). Cardiff: ACS.
