= Hugh Priestley =

English cricketer and stockbroker

Personal information
- Full name: Hugh William Priestley
- Born: 19 September 1887; Marylebone, London, England
- Died: 6 January 1932 (aged 44); Marylebone, London, England
- Batting: Right-handed
- Bowling: Right-arm medium
- Relatives: Robert Priestley (son)

Domestic team information
- Years: Team
- 1911: Marylebone Cricket Club
- 1907: Buckinghamshire

Career statistics
Competition	First-class
Matches	1
Runs scored	33
Batting average	16.50
100s/50s	–/–
Top score	31
Balls bowled	6
Wickets	1
Bowling average	16.00
5 wickets in innings	–
10 wickets in match	–
Best bowling	1/16
Catches/stumpings	–/–
- Source: Cricinfo, 14 May 2011

Hugh William Priestley MC (19 September 1887 – 6 January 1932) was an English stockbroker and cricketer. Priestley was a right-handed batsman who bowled right-arm medium pace. He was born in Marylebone, London and later educated at Uppingham School, where he played for the school cricket team.

Priestley made a single Minor Counties Championship appearance for Buckinghamshire in 1907 against the Worcestershire Second XI. He later made his only first-class appearance for the Marylebone Cricket Club against Cambridge University in 1911. In the MCC first-innings he was dismissed for 31 by Henry Grierson. In their second-innings, he scored 2 runs before being dismissed by the same bowler. Hardy took a single wicket in the Cambridge University first-innings, that of university captain John Frederick Ireland for the cost of 16 runs from a single over.

Priestly was a stockbroker joining first the firm of Hichens Harrison and Company around 1909 and later moving to Laing and Cruickshank. In 1914 he joined the Post Office Rifles (the 8th Battalion London Regiment) and served in France from 27 January 1917. He was awarded the Military Cross in July 1918 and was severely wounded in August 1918. He became a partner in the Laing and Cruikshank before moving in 1923 to Mullens, Marshall, Steer, Lawford & Company where he became one of the official brokers to the Commissioners of the National Debt. As well as cricket he was an expert in dry fly fishing and shooting. He had married Elizabeth Grainger Hall in 1911 and they had three sons, the eldest Robert also played first-class cricket.

He died in Marylebone, London on 6 January 1932.

== Honours and awards ==
On 26 July 1918 Captain Hugh William Priestley, London Regiment was awarded the Military Cross:

For conspicuous gallantry and resource during lengthy operations as adjutant of the battalion, and later in command, when he showed the greatest courage and devotion under heavy hostile shell and machine-gun fire in organising both our own and French troops for the defence of a position, guiding them personally into their posts. After it was largely in the enemy's hands he carried an important message, under heavy fire, whereby he was able to withdraw the remnants of the battalion.

— London Gazette
