= Robert Priestley (cricketer) =

English cricketer

Personal information
- Full name: Robert Hugh Priestley
- Born: 23 November 1911; Maida Vale, London, England
- Died: 30 November 2007 (aged 96); Oakley, Hampshire, England
- Batting: Right-handed
- Bowling: Right-arm off break
- Relatives: Hugh Priestley (father)

Career statistics
| Competition | First-class |
|---|---|
| Matches | 1 |
| Runs scored | 16 |
| Batting average | 8.00 |
| 100s/50s | –/– |
| Top score | 16 |
| Catches/stumpings | –/– |
- Source: Cricinfo, 1 March 2019

Robert Hugh Priestley (23 November 1911 – 30 November 2007) was an English first-class cricketer.

Priestly was born at Maida Vale to Hugh Priestley and his wife, Elizabeth Grainger Hall. He was educated at Winchester College. He made one appearance in first-class cricket for the Free Foresters against Cambridge University at Cambridge in 1932. Batting twice in the match, Priestley was dismissed without scoring by Rodney Rought-Rought in the Free Forester's first-innings, while in their second-innings he was dismissed by the same bowler for 16 runs.

He married Mary Hermia, daughter of Sir George Menteth Boughey, 9th Bt in 1935, with the couple having three children. He died one week after his 96th birthday in November 2007 at Oakley, Hampshire.
