= William Bythell =

English cricketer and soldier

Personal information
- Full name: William John Bythell
- Born: 9 September 1862; Poona, Bombay Presidency, British India
- Died: 30 June 1920 (aged 57); Southsea, Hampshire, England
- Batting: Right-handed

Domestic team information
- Years: Team
- 1903: Marylebone Cricket Club

Career statistics
Competition	First-class
Matches	1
Runs scored	8
Batting average	4.00
100s/50s	–/–
Top score	6
Catches/stumpings	–/–
- Source: Cricinfo, 7 June 2021

William John Bythell CBE (9 September 1862 – 30 June 1920) was an English first-class cricketer and British Army officer.

== Biography ==
The son of Colonel Bythell of the Bombay Staff Corps, he was born in British India at Poona in September 1862. He was educated in England at Newton Abbot College, before attending the Royal Military Academy, Woolwich. He graduated from Woolwich as a lieutenant into the Royal Engineers in July 1882. He served in British India with the Royal Engineers and was a part of 400-strong column which took part in the expedition against Lienpunga in Assam, where he carried out survey operations as part of his role as an assistant superintendent for the Survey of India. Bythell was promoted to captain in January 1891, and was later praised for his survey operations during the Chitral Relief Expedition of November 1895. By January 1898, he held the rank of brevet major and took part in the Mohmand campaign of 1897–98, where he was further mentioned in dispatches. He was promoted to the full rank of major in January 1900.

Bythell was a keen amateur cricketer, playing club cricket in India for Shimla. Returning to England in 1903, he made a single appearance in first-class cricket for the Marylebone Cricket Club against London County at Crystal Palace. Batting twice in the match, he was dismissed for scores of 6 and 2 by Joe Vine and Carst Posthuma respectively. In the Royal Engineers, he was promoted to lieutenant colonel in September 1906, later being made a brevet colonel in September 1909. He served in the First World War in the Southern Command and the Chemical Warfare Department under Major-General Henry Fleetwood Thuillier. He retired from active service midway through the in May 1916 and was placed on an Indian pension. Blythell was made a CBE in the 1919 Birthday Honours, for services rendered in connection with the war. He died at the King's Service Nursing Home at Southsea in June 1920.
