= Edward Mignon =

English cricketer

Edward Mignon (1 November 1885 – 14 May 1925) was an English first-class cricketer active 1905–1914 who played for Middlesex and Marylebone Cricket Club (MCC). He was born in Kilburn; died in Southwark.
