= William Scott (English cricketer, born 1864) =

English cricketer (1864–1920)

William Jerman Scott (4 April 1864 – 18 July 1920) was an English first-class cricketer active 1880–95 who played for Middlesex and Marylebone Cricket Club (MCC). He was born in Hartley Wintney, Hampshire; died in Windsor.
