= K. S. Gaekwar =

Indian cricketer (1918–1960)

Udayasinhrao Shivajirao (K. S.) Gaekwar (11 June 1918 – 11 August 1960) was an Indian first-class cricketer active in 1939 who played for Cambridge University. He was born and died in Baroda. He appeared in four first-class matches.
