= Kenneth Carlisle (cricketer, born 1908) =

English cricketer

Kenneth Ralph Malcolm Carlisle (28 March 1908 – 23 July 1983) was an English cricketer active from 1927 to 1929 who played for Sussex. He was born in Buenos Aires and died in Kensington. He appeared in five first-class matches as a righthanded batsman who bowled right arm medium pace. He scored 101 runs with a highest score of 34.

Carlisle was educated at Harrow and Magdalen College, Oxford. He worked for a firm of accountants 1931–32, then for Liebig's Extract of Meat Company in South America 1933–34 and in Europe 1935–37. During World War II he served in the Rifle Brigade with the rank of major. He was awarded the Medal of Military Merit (Greece) (Note: Who Was Who says "Distinguished Service Medal (Greece)", which was the name used in British publications for the Medal of Military Merit (Greece).) and appointed chevalier of the Order of Leopold (Belgium).
