= Benjamin Nicholls =

English cricketer

Personal information
- Full name: Benjamin Ernest Nicholls
- Born: 4 October 1864; Byfleet, Surrey, England
- Died: 6 June 1945 (aged 80); Kirdford, Sussex, England
- Batting: Right-handed
- Bowling: Right-arm slow

Domestic team information
- Years: Team
- 1901: Marylebone Cricket Club
- 1884–1885: Oxford University
- 1883–1888: Sussex

Career statistics
| Competition | First-class |
|---|---|
| Matches | 16 |
| Runs scored | 192 |
| Batting average | 10.10 |
| 100s/50s | –/– |
| Top score | 44 |
| Balls bowled | 1,368 |
| Wickets | 31 |
| Bowling average | 21.48 |
| 5 wickets in innings | 1 |
| 10 wickets in match | – |
| Best bowling | 5/46 |
| Catches/stumpings | 23/– |
- Source: Cricinfo, 18 July 2013

Benjamin Ernest Nicholls (4 October 1864 – 6 June 1945) was an English cricketer active in the 1880s and briefly in 1901, making sixteen appearances in first-class cricket. Nicholls was a right-handed batsman and right-arm slow bowler, who played first-class cricket for Sussex, Oxford University, and the Marylebone Cricket Club.

== Career and life ==
The son of Henry Nicholls, he was born at Byfleet, Surrey, and was educated at Winchester College and Magdalen College, Oxford. Nicholls made his first-class debut for Sussex against Nottinghamshire in 1883 at Trent Bridge, with him making a further appearance for the county in that season against Derbyshire. While attending the University of Oxford, Nicholls played first-class cricket for the university cricket club, making his debut for the club against the touring Australians at the Christ Church Ground, during which he took seven catches at short slip. Nicholls made seven further first-class appearances in that season, all for the university, scoring 146 runs at an average of 14.60, with a high score of 44, while with the ball he took 23 wickets, averaging 20.08 per wicket, with best figures of 5/46. These figures came against Lancashire. This season represented his best return with both bat and ball. In 1885, Nicholls made four further first-class appearances for the university, with him gaining an Oxford blue for his representation of the cricket club. Following the end of his studies, Nicholls made a further first-class appearance for Sussex in 1888 against Kent at Hove, before a thirteen-year gap before his final first-class appearance for the Marylebone Cricket Club against Oxford University in 1901.

Nicholls married Violet Mary Osmaston on 26 April 1899, with the couple having three children (two daughters followed by a son). He died at Kirdford, Sussex on 6 June 1945.
