= Farmington, Gloucestershire =

Village in Gloucestershire, England

Coordinates: 51.8361°N 1.8050°W

Farmington
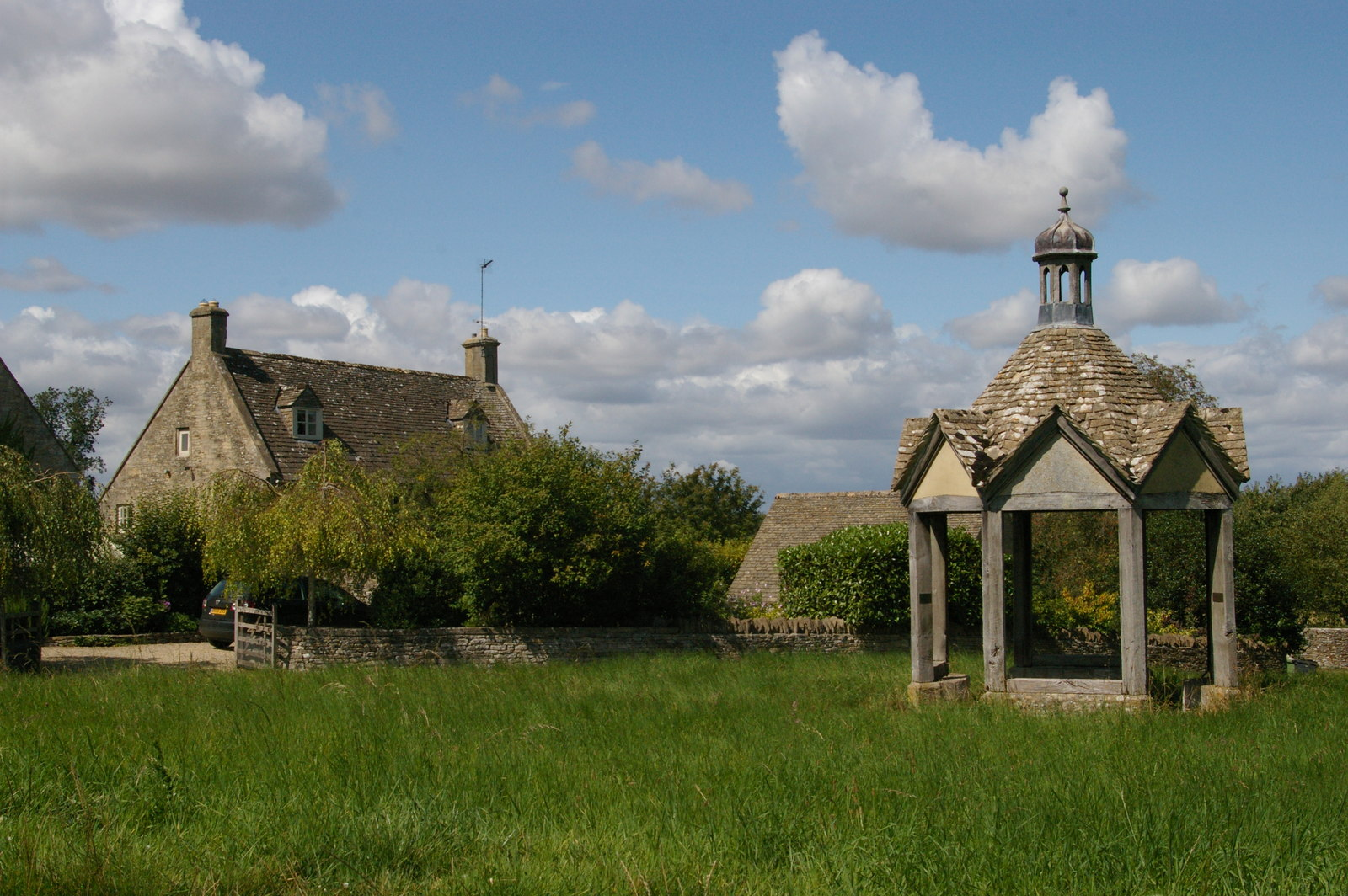
- View of the village green

- Location within Gloucestershire
- Population: 112
- OS grid reference: SP134153
- Civil parish: Farmington
- District: Cotswold
- Shire county: Gloucestershire
- Region: South West
- Country: England
- Sovereign state: United Kingdom
- Post town: Cheltenham
- Postcode district: GL54
- Dialling code: 01451
- UK Parliament: North Cotswolds

Farmington is a village located in the county of Gloucestershire, in England. As of 2011 the village had 112 residents. It is mentioned in the Domesday Book of 1086 as Tormentone.

== History ==
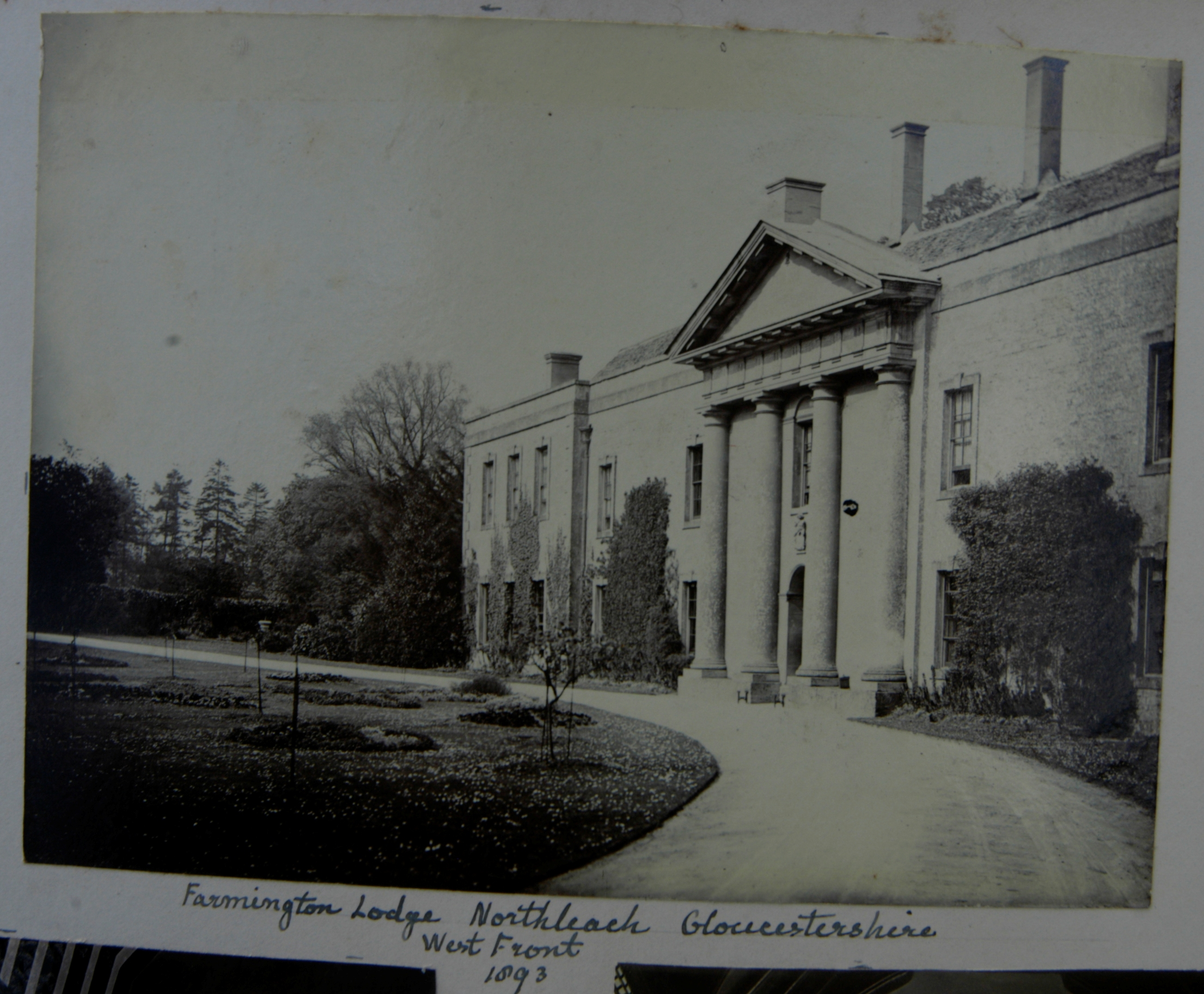
Edmund Waller's (d.1898) Farmington Lodge, Northleach, Gloucestershire, west front, 1893.

Farmington was sold in 1724 to Edmund Waller of Beaconsfield (died 1771); and thence by descent to Edmund Waller, MP for Amersham; Edmund Waller (1725–1788), MP for Wycombe; Edmund Waller (d.1810); Rev. Harry Waller (d.1824) (Rector of Farmington from 1786, and of Vicar of Winslow from 1789); Harry Edmund (d.1869); Edmund Waller (d.1898); and Major-General William Noel Waller, RA (d.1909), whose executors sold it in 1910.

The Church of St Peter was built in the 12th century. It is a grade-I listed building.

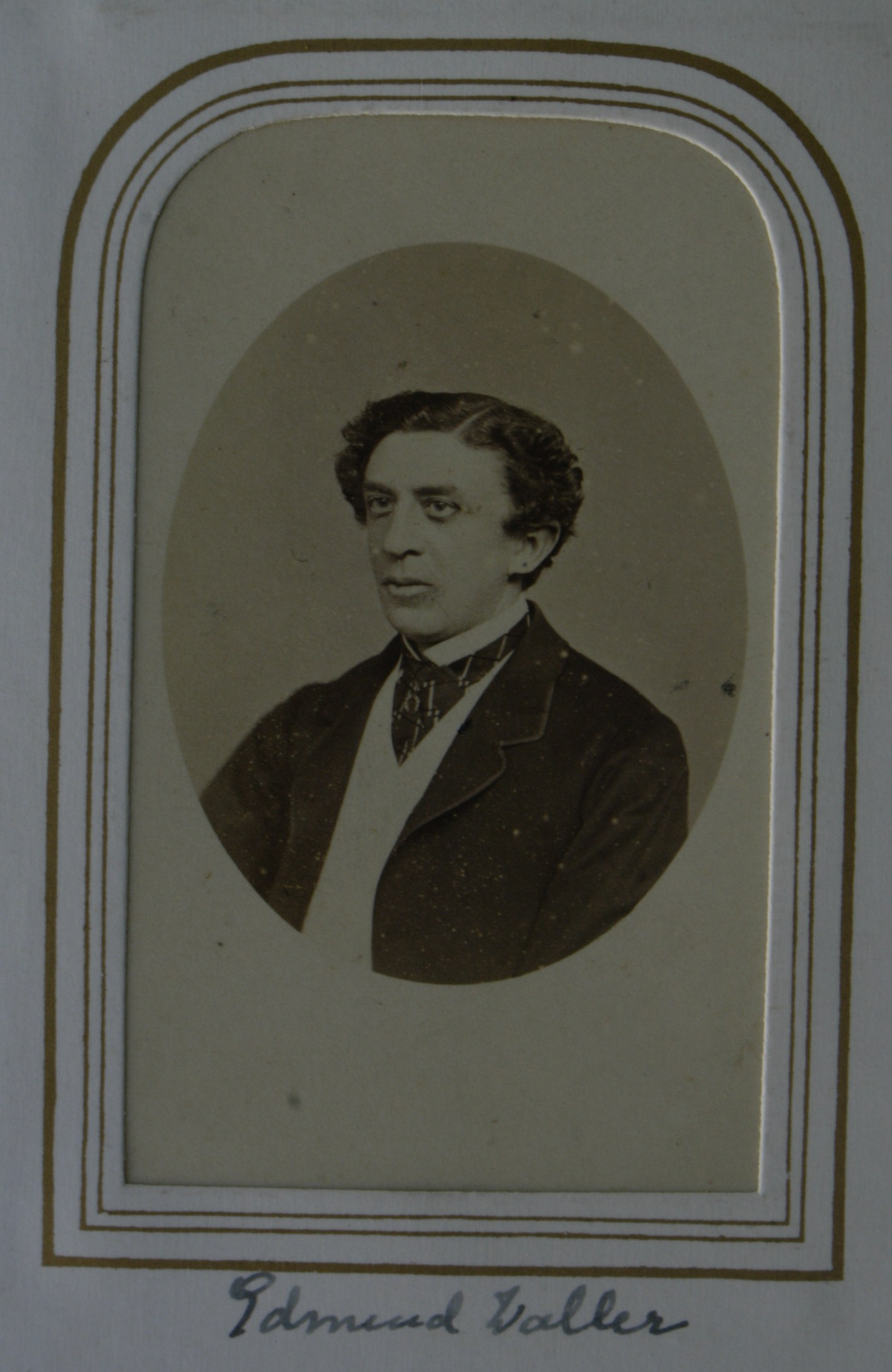
Edmund Waller VI or VII, (1828-98), JP, DL, of Farmington Lodge, 1869–98.

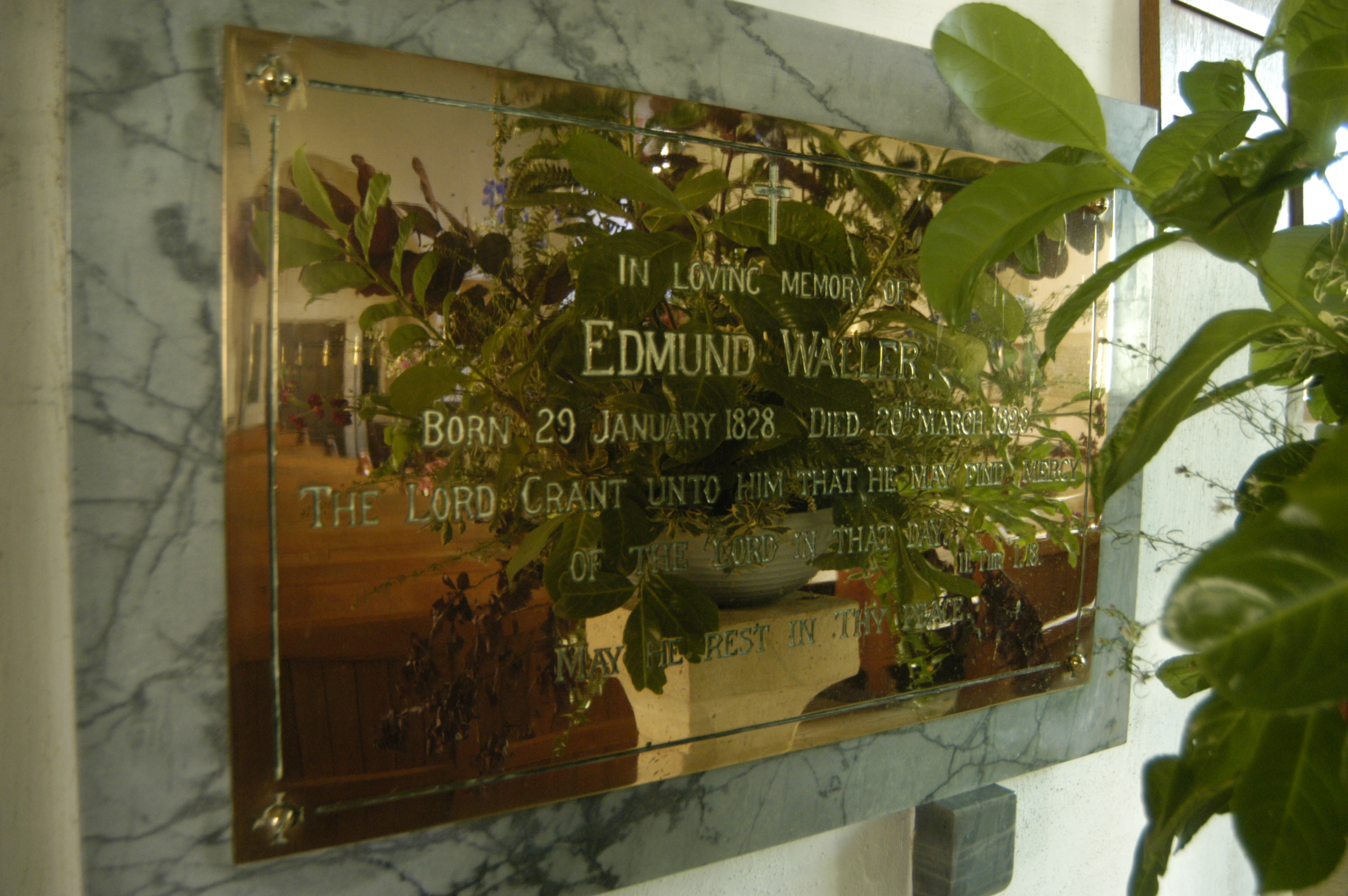
Brass plaque to Edmund Waller (1828-98) in church of St. Peter's.

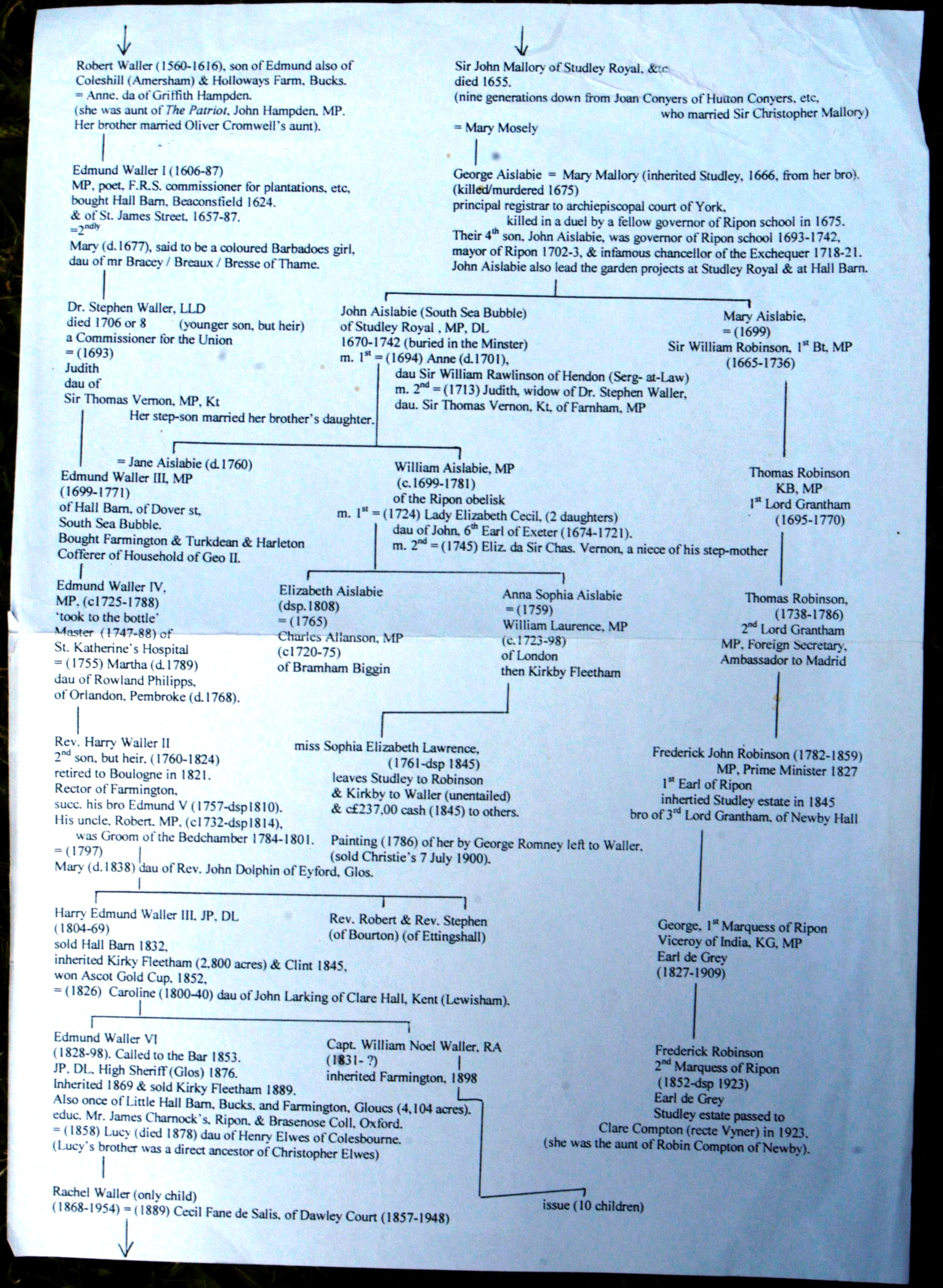
Waller of Farmington chart, 1560–1954.

== Notable residents ==
- Robert Carr (1916–2012), English politician, buried in St. Peter's Churchyard
