= Clayton Palmer =

English cricketer

Clayton Palmer (14 July 1885 – 11 April 1956) was an English first-class cricketer active 1904–12 who played for Middlesex. He was born in Westminster; died in East Grinstead.
