= Arthur Pike =

English cricketer

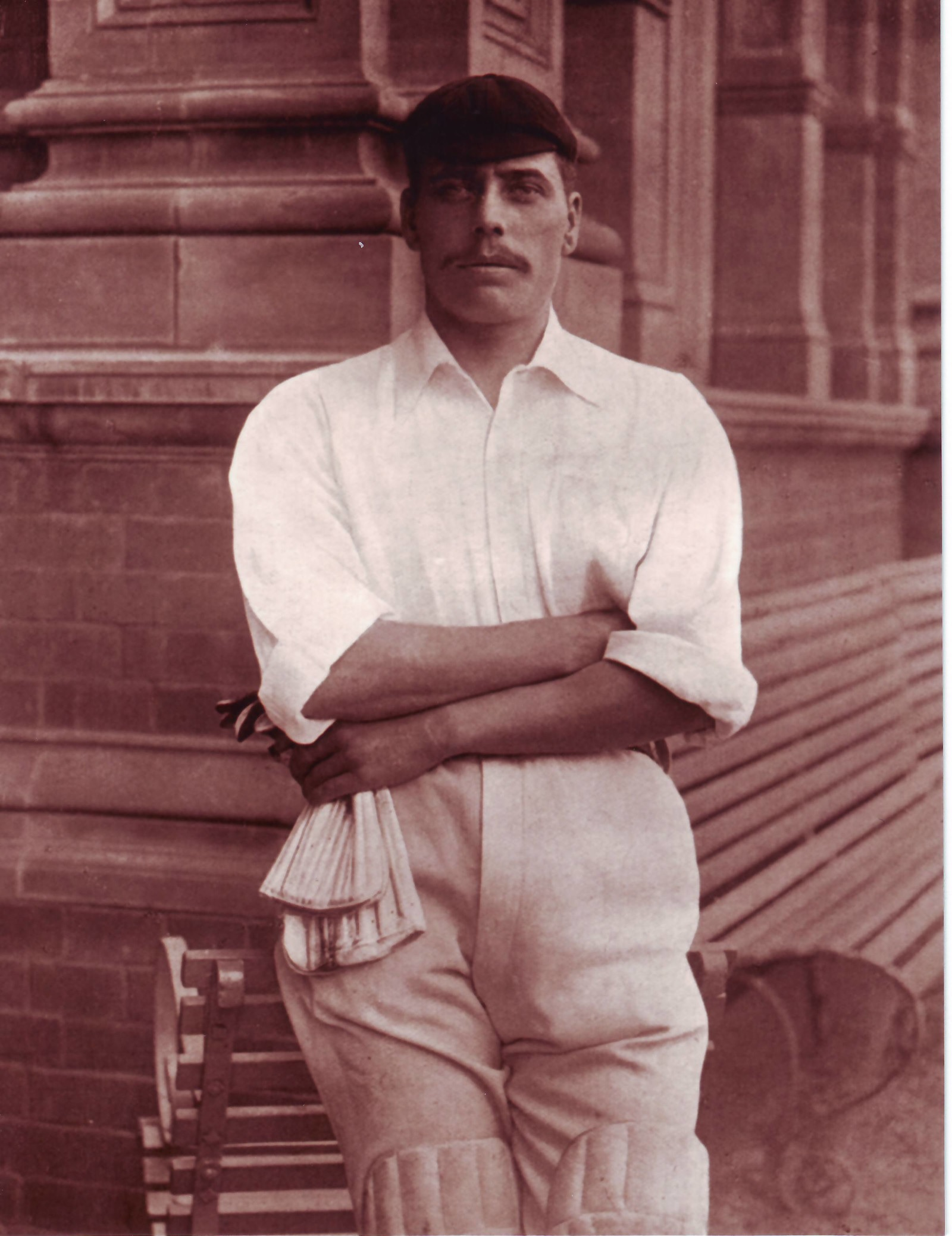

Personal information
- Born: 25 December 1862; Keyworth
- Died: 15 November 1907 (aged 48); Keyworth
- Batting: Right-handed
- Role: Wicket-keeper-Batsman

Domestic team information
- Years: Team
- 1894–1899: Nottinghamshire
- 1901: MCC

Career statistics
Competition	First-class
Matches	66
Runs scored	1128
Batting average	13.92
100s/50s	0/3
Top score	66
Balls bowled	-
Wickets	-
Bowling average	-
5 wickets in innings	-
10 wickets in match	-
Best bowling	-
Catches/stumpings	102/30
- Source: CricInfo, 19 August 2020

Arthur Pike (25 December 1862 – 15 November 1907) was an English first-class cricketer active 1894–1901 who played for Nottinghamshire as a wicketkeeper. He was born and died in Keyworth.

Arthur Pike was a member of the Pike family from Keyworth which produced cricketers and footballers. These included Harry Pike and Horace Pike. On 4 January 1890, Horace, Arthur and Harry all played in the same Nottingham Forest side in a home match against Sheffield Wednesday. Forest lost 3-1.

== Cricket ==
Pike played cricket as a Wicket-keeper. Before playing for Nottinghamshire, he played for Keyworth CC, Nottingham Commercial CC, Notts Manufacturing CC and Leyland CC in Lancashire. He made his First-class cricket debut for Nottinghamshire in May 1894 at Trent Bridge against Yorkshire. His highest score was 66 against Middlesex at Trent Bridge in August 1896.

His best seasons behind the wicket were 1896 with 27 caught, 7 stumped and 1897 with 23 caught 12 stumped.

He made 1 appearance for the MCC at Lord's in May 1901 with 3 catches and 2 stumpings.

After his playing career, Pike went on to become an umpire between 1901 and 1905.

== Football ==
Pike also played football as a Left Back and made 3 competitive appearances for Nottingham Forest. He made his non competitive debut on 25 October 1884 at home to Blackburn Rovers and his competitive debut in the FA Cup against Notts Swifts on 15 October 1887. He made over 30 non competitive appearances for Forest between 1884 and 1890. His last game for Nottingham Forest was the Football Alliance game on 4 January 1890 against Sheffield Wednesday.

=== Career statistics ===
Club	Season	Football Alliance		FA Cup		Total	
Club	Season	Apps	Goals	Apps	Goals	Apps	Goals
Nottingham Forest	1887-88	0	0	1	0	1	0
Nottingham Forest	1888-89	0	0	1	0	1	0
Nottingham Forest	1889-90	1	0	0	0	1	0
Nottingham Forest	Total	1	0	2	0	3	0
Career total		1	0	2	0	3	0
