= Hugh Teesdale =

English cricketer

Hugh Teesdale (12 February 1886 – 31 March 1971) was an English first-class cricketer active 1906–10 who played for Surrey, Marylebone Cricket Club (MCC) and Oxford University. He was born in Addlestone; died in Hove.
