= Epifanio Rodriguez =

Spanish cricketer

Personal information
- Full name: Chevalier Epifanio Rodriguez
- Born: 1855; Andalucia, Spain
- Died: 20 November 1912 (aged 57); Westminster, London, England
- Batting: Unknown

Domestic team information
- Years: Team
- 1900: Marylebone Cricket Club

Career statistics
Competition	First-class
Matches	1
Runs scored	1
Batting average	1.00
100s/50s	–/–
Top score	1*
Catches/stumpings	–/–
- Source: Cricinfo, 28 August 2021

Chevalier Epifanio Rodriguez (1855 — 20 November 1912) was a Spanish first-class cricketer.

Rodriguez was born at Andalucia in 1855. He later moved to England, where he played first-class cricket for the Marylebone Cricket Club (MCC) against London County in 1900 at Crystal Palace. Batting twice in the match, he was dismissed without scoring by Len Braund in the MCC first innings, while in their second innings he was unbeaten on 1. Rodriguez was facetiously known in cricketing circles as 'the best cover-point in Spain'. Besides playing cricket, Rodriguez was by profession a sherry shipper and commission agent. He was also a collector of oriental porcelain, which was later sold at Christie's in 1914. Rodriguez died in November 1912 at Westminster.
