= John Wormald =

English cricketer

Major John Wormald (23 February 1882 – 13 November 1957) was an English first-class cricketer active 1900–23 who played for Middlesex and Marylebone Cricket Club (MCC). He was born in Westminster; died in East Dereham.

Wormald was commissioned into the British Army as a second lieutenant in the 7th (Militia) battalion of the King's Royal Rifle Corps on 21 March 1900. He was awarded the Military Cross while serving with the King's Royal Rifle Corps in France during the First World War.
