= Henry Stratton =

English cricketer

Personal information
- Full name: Henry Duncan Stratton
- Born: 10 May 1870; Wolverhampton, Staffordshire, England
- Died: 26 February 1958 (aged 87); Bexhill-on-Sea, Sussex, England
- Batting: Right-handed

Domestic team information
- Years: Team
- 1904–1914: Marylebone Cricket Club
- 1897–1910: Staffordshire

Career statistics
Competition	First-class
Matches	4
Runs scored	75
Batting average	15.00
100s/50s	–/–
Top score	20
Balls bowled	–
Wickets	–
Bowling average	–
5 wickets in innings	–
10 wickets in match	–
Best bowling	–
Catches/stumpings	1/–
- Source: Cricinfo, 22 March 2015

Henry Duncan Stratton (10 May 1870 – 26 February 1958) was an English cricketer active from 1897 to 1914. Born at Wolverhampton, Staffordshire, he was a right-handed batsman who made four appearances in first-class cricket, but was mostly associated with minor counties cricket.

Stratton made his debut in minor counties cricket for Staffordshire against Northamptonshire in the 1897 Minor Counties Championship at Birmingham. He played minor counties cricket for Staffordshire until 1910, all told making a total of 92 appearances in the Minor Counties Championship, during some of which he was club captain. His played his first first-class match for the Marylebone Cricket Club in 1904 against Leicestershire at Lord's. He made three further appearances in first-class cricket for the Marylebone Cricket Club, playing two further matches against Leicestershire in 1906 and 1907, before playing a final match against Oxford University in 1914. He scored a total of 75 runs in his four matches, with a high score of 20.

He died at Bexhill-on-Sea, Sussex on 26 February 1958.
