= Stanley Douglas-Jones =

English cricketer and British Army officer

Personal information
- Full name: Stanley Douglas Douglas-Jones
- Born: 19 November 1885; Hendon, Middlesex, England
- Died: 12 October 1969 (aged 83); Glyndyfrdwy, Merionethshire, Wales
- Batting: Unknown
- Role: Wicket-keeper

Domestic team information
- Years: Team
- 1913–1914: Marylebone Cricket Club

Career statistics
| Competition | First-class |
|---|---|
| Matches | 2 |
| Runs scored | 30 |
| Batting average | 10.00 |
| 100s/50s | –/– |
| Top score | 12 |
| Catches/stumpings | –/1 |
- Source: Cricinfo, 12 May 2021

Stanley Douglas Douglas-Jones MC DSO (19 November 1885 – 12 October 1969) was an English first-class cricketer and British Army officer.

The son of Colonel Douglas Forde Douglas-Jones, he was born at Hendon in November 1885. Douglas-Jones served in the British Army, where he was initially commissioned a second lieutenant with the Duke of Edinburgh's Own Edinburgh Artillery militia in December 1902, before being promoted to lieutenant in March 1904. He transferred to the Royal Artillery in December 1904, with the rank of second lieutenant. He was promoted to lieutenant in December 1907, before being seconded for service as an adjutant in the Territorial Force in March 1911, at which point he was made a temporary captain. A regular player for the British Army cricket team, Douglas-Jones also played two first-class cricket matches for the Marylebone Cricket Club in 1913 and 1914, both against Kent at Lord's. He scored 30 runs in his two matches, with a highest score of 12. Playing as a wicket-keeper, he also made a single stumping.

Douglas-Jones served with the Royal Artillery during the First World War. In October 1914, he was promoted to the full rank of captain, while in September 1916 he was appointed a temporary major while commanding a battalion. He relinquished his temporary appointment in February 1917. Douglas-Jones was twice decorated during the war, being awarded the Military Cross in the 1915 Birthday Honours and being made a companion of the Distinguished Service Order in the 1917 Birthday Honours. In December 1917, he was appointed to the staff. He was again made a temporary major in Februaery 1918, with him gaining the brevet rank of major shortly after the conclusion of the war in December 1918. Douglas-Jones attended the staff college in January 1920, later being appointed to the War Office in May 1921. He gained the real rank of major in December 1923, which was antedated to July 1915. Having been seconded to the Territorial Army, Douglas-Jones returned to the Royal Artillery in March 1928, before retiring from active service in December of the same year. He died in Wales at Glyndyfrdwy in October 1969. He was married to Priscilla Scarlett Smith, with the couple having no children. She survived him by 16 years.
