= Amos Spring =

English cricketer

William Amos Spring (17 May 1880 – 14 March 1958) was an English first-class cricketer active 1903–14 who played for Surrey. He was born in Dulwich; died in Enfield, Middlesex.
