= William Overton (cricketer) =

English cricketer

Personal information
- Full name: William Overton
- Born: 28 March 1873; Swindon, Wiltshire, England
- Died: 6 August 1949 (aged 76); Paddington, London, England
- Batting: Right-handed
- Bowling: Left-arm medium

Domestic team information
- Years: Team
- 1896–1922: Wiltshire
- 1898–1908: Marylebone Cricket Club

Career statistics
Competition	First-class
Matches	8
Runs scored	63
Batting average	7.87
100s/50s	–/–
Top score	19
Balls bowled	748
Wickets	21
Bowling average	16.19
5 wickets in innings	–
10 wickets in match	–
Best bowling	4/22
Catches/stumpings	5/–
- Source: Cricinfo, 28 June 2019

William Overton (28 March 1873 – 6 August 1949) was an English first-class cricketer.

Overton was born at Swindon in March 1873. He made his debut in minor counties cricket for Wiltshire in the 1896 Minor Counties Championship. He made his debut in first-class cricket for the Marylebone Cricket Club (MCC) against Nottinghamshire in 1898. He played first-class cricket for MCC until 1908, making eight appearances. Playing as a left-arm medium pace bowler, Overton took 21 wickets in his eight matches for MCC, at an average of 16.19 and with best figures of 4 for 22.

He featured regularly for Wiltshire in the Minor Counties Championship, making 143 appearances before the First World War. He made 21 appearances following the conclusion of the war, with his final minor counties appearance being in 1922. He was described as one of the county's leading bowlers both before and after the war by the Wisden Cricketers' Almanack. He died at Paddington in August 1949.
