= Edwin Barnett =

English cricketer

Personal information
- Full name: Edwin Ernest Barnett
- Born: 26 September 1870; Leominster, Herefordshire, England
- Batting: Unknown
- Bowling: Unknown

Domestic team information
- Years: Team
- 1913: Buckinghamshire
- 1908: Marylebone Cricket Club

Career statistics
Competition	First-class
Matches	1
Runs scored	70
Batting average	35.50
100s/50s	–/1
Top score	71
Balls bowled	–
Wickets	–
Bowling average	–
5 wickets in innings	–
10 wickets in match	–
Best bowling	–
Catches/stumpings	1/–
- Source: Cricinfo, 8 May 2011

Edwin Ernest Barnett (26 September 1870 – ) was an English cricketer. Barnett's batting and bowling styles are unknown.

Barnett was born in Leominster, Herefordshire, to surgeon Samuel Barnett MRCS JP and his wife, Mary Ann.

Barnett made his only first-class appearance for the Marylebone Cricket Club in 1908 against Leicestershire at Lord's. In this match he scored a single run in the MCC first-innings, before being dismissed by John King. In their second-innings he scored 70 runs before being dismissed by Ewart Astill. Barnett played a single Minor Counties Championship match for Buckinghamshire against Berkshire in 1913.

Below first-class level Barnett played, in a single county match, for Shropshire in 1899, scoring a century with 136 runs, and for Hertfordshire, and at club level for Hampstead and Richmond.
