= Raymond Fox =

English cricketer and British Army officer

Personal information
- Full name: Raymond Wodehouse Fox
- Born: 11 July 1873; Frampton Cotterell, Gloucestershire, England
- Died: 21 August 1948 (aged 75); Ticehurst, Sussex, England
- Batting: Right-handed
- Role: Wicketkeeper

Domestic team information
- Years: Team
- 1896 to 1898: Oxford University
- 1896 to 1900: Sussex

Career statistics
Competition	First-class
Matches	27
Runs scored	106
Batting average	5.30
100s/50s	0/0
Top score	20
Catches/stumpings	39/13
- Source: Cricinfo, 21 November 2017

Raymond Wodehouse Fox (11 July 1873 – 21 August 1948) was a British Army officer and cricketer. He played first-class cricket for Oxford University from 1896 to 1898, for Sussex from 1896 to 1900, and occasional matches thereafter.

== Biography ==
Fox was born in Gloucestershire, and educated at Wellington College, Berkshire, and Hertford College, Oxford. In all he appeared in 27 first-class matches as a right-handed batsman and wicketkeeper. He scored 106 runs with a highest score of 20 and completed 39 catches with 13 stumpings.

He joined the army as a second lieutenant in 1900 and served in the Boer War. He was promoted to Lieutenant on 8 January 1902, and joined the Royal Warwickshire Regiment in March the same year. His final rank was lieutenant-colonel.

Fox died at Ticehurst in Sussex in August 1948, aged 75.
