= William Oates (cricketer, born 1862) =

English cricketer

William Coape Oates (7 July 1862 – 20 February 1942) was an English first-class cricketer active 1881–95 who played for Nottinghamshire. He was born in Nottinghamshire; died in Lincoln.

He was educated at Harrow School where he played for the XI.
