= Henry Grierson =

English cricketer, barrister, and author

Personal information
- Born: 26 August 1891; Chertsey, Surrey
- Died: 29 January 1972 (aged 80); Sunbury-on-Thames
- Bowling: Left-arm medium pace bowler

Domestic team information
- Years: Team
- 1909–1921: Bedfordshire
- 1911–1912: Cambridge University
- Source: , 18 April 2011

Henry Grierson (26 August 1891 – 29 January 1972) was an English cricketer, barrister and author, who played cricket for Bedfordshire between 1909 and 1921 and for Cambridge University from 1911 to 1912.

== Early life ==
Born on 26 August 1891 in Chertsey, Surrey, Henry Grierson was educated at Bedford School. E. H. D. Sewell, a friend who lived locally, thought he should have been in the school cricket eleven in 1906, aged 15, on the strength of his consistent bowling.

Grierson went on to Pembroke College, Cambridge. His first Minor Counties Championship appearances for Bedfordshire came in 1909. He played 11 matches of first-class cricket for Cambridge University and gained his Blue in 1911 and 1912. He continued to play for Bedfordshire until 1921. He was also a rugby union player, for Bedford, Leicester and Rosslyn Park F.C.

== World War I ==
In World War I, Grierson was recruited into "Mobbs' Own", the pals battalion of the Northamptonshire Regiment raised by his friend Edgar Mobbs. He wrote for The Wipers Times, using the pseudonym P.B.I. (Poor Bloody Infantry). He also took part in a rugby match on 30 January 1915, billed as England v Scotland, in which Mobbs captained the England side, containing a dozen players from his unit. Grierson and Mobbs were wounded in August 1916, fighting in the Battle of the Somme at Guillemont.

== Later life ==
In 1936, at the age of 45, Grierson concluded that if he could "raise a sufficient number of good players of forty and over, we might be sharp enough to handle some of the school sides". He persuaded Sir Pelham Warner and Jack Hobbs to become President and Vice President of a new club, to be called The Forty Club, with members being forty years of age or older. The XL was adopted as its logo and the first game was played against Wellingborough School in June 1937.

Henry Grierson became a broadcaster, commentating on rugby matches. In 1942 he was made a Commandant in the Northamptonshire Special Constabulary. He died in Sunbury-on-Thames on 29 January 1972, aged 80.

== Family ==
The marriage of Henry Grierson and Eleanor Lilian Banister, known as Nancy, at Horsell church, was announced in August 1915; it was registered in September. Lilian Eleanor Banister was born in 1890. In 1895 Nancy Banister was bridesmaid to her cousin Ella Myres, daughter of Thomas Myres and Katharine Mary Banister, daughter of Frederick Dale Banister. Herbert Banister, only surviving son of Frederick Banister, graduated from Oxford in 1889, and became a railway engineer in India. He married in 1889 Lilian Flora Buxton Lawford, daughter of Major-General Edward Melville Lawford of the Madras Cavalry. He died in 1901.

== Publications ==
- The Ramblings of a Rabbit (1924)
