= Ahsan-ul-Haq =

Indian cricketer

Cricket information
- Batting: Right-handed
- Bowling: Right-arm medium

Career statistics
Competition	First-class
Matches	7
Runs scored	172
Batting average	21.50
100s/50s	1/0
Top score	100*
Balls bowled	90
Wickets	0
Bowling average	–
5 wickets in innings	–
10 wickets in match	–
Best bowling	–
Catches/stumpings	4/–
- Source: CricketArchive, 30 October 2022

Ahsan-ul-Haq (16 July 1878 – 29 December 1957) was an Indian cricketer. He was a hard-hitting right-handed batsman and a right-arm medium fast bowler.

Born in Jullundur, Ahsan-ul-Haq went to England to study law where he played for Hampstead in club cricket. In June 1901, Haq scored 135 for Middlesex Second XI against Sussex Second XI. In the next year, he played three first-class matches for Middlesex. But his official work restricted his appearances and he soon returned to India.

At the age of 45 he captained the Muslims in the Lahore tournament of 1924. On what was his first appearance in a first-class match on Indian soil, he went in last against Sikhs and scored 100 not out in 40 minutes, adding 150 in an unbroken tenth-wicket partnership with Abdus Salaam. Excluding centuries made under contrived circumstances, it is the second-fastest hundred (in terms of minutes) ever made in first-class cricket.

Haq was later involved in the creation of the Indian cricket board.
