= Charles Hulls =

English cricketer

Personal information
- Full name: Charles Henry Hulls
- Born: 18 March 1861; Luton, Bedfordshire, England
- Died: 19 December 1912 (aged 51); Southend-on-Sea, Essex, England
- Batting: Right-handed
- Bowling: Right-arm medium

Domestic team information
- Years: Team
- 1885: Somerset
- 1889–1905: Marylebone Cricket Club
- 1896: Oxfordshire
- First-class debut: 3 August 1885 Somerset v Gloucestershire
- Last First-class: 25 June 1896 MCC v Cambridge University

Career statistics
Competition	First-class
Matches	2
Runs scored	38
Batting average	9.50
100s/50s	0/0
Top score	30
Balls bowled	8
Wickets	0
Bowling average	–
5 wickets in innings	0
10 wickets in match	0
Best bowling	0/5
Catches/stumpings	1/–
- Source: CricketArchive, 10 July 2011

Charles Henry Hulls (18 March 1861 – 19 December 1912) was an English cricketer who played first-class cricket for Somerset County Cricket Club and the Marylebone Cricket Club (MCC) in the late 1800s. He also made one appearance in the Minor Counties Championship for Oxfordshire.

A right-handed batsman and right-arm medium pace bowler, he made his debut in senior cricket for Somerset in 1885. He played for the MCC between 1889 and 1905, primarily in non first-class matches, though he did appear in their 1896 match against Cambridge University which was given first-class status. He generally appeared as a lower order batsman, but rarely bowled.
