= Frederick Carlisle =

English cricketer

Frederick Carlisle (4 November 1849 – 22 October 1920) was an English cricketer active in 1869 who played for Lancashire. He was born in Liverpool and died in Eastbourne. He appeared in two first-class matches, scoring 37 runs with a highest score of 18.
