= Cecil Payne (cricketer) =

English cricketer

Personal information
- Full name: Cecil Arthur Lynch Payne
- Born: 30 August 1885; Dacca, British India
- Died: 21 March 1976 (aged 90); Vancouver, British Columbia, Canada
- Batting: Right-handed
- Bowling: Right-arm medium

Domestic team information
- Years: Team
- 1905–1909: Middlesex
- 1906–1907: Oxford University

Career statistics
| Competition | First-class |
|---|---|
| Matches | 29 |
| Runs scored | 1001 |
| Batting average | 20.42 |
| 100s/50s | 1/6 |
| Top score | 101 |
| Balls bowled | 54 |
| Wickets | 0 |
| Bowling average | – |
| 5 wickets in innings | – |
| 10 wickets in match | – |
| Best bowling | – |
| Catches/stumpings | 10/– |
- Source: Cricinfo, 2 October 2017

Cecil Arthur Lynch Payne (30 August 1885 – 21 March 1976) was an English first-class cricketer who played irregularly for Middlesex from 1905 to 1909. He was born in Dacca, educated at Charterhouse School and New College, Oxford, and died in Vancouver.

On his first-class debut, playing for Marylebone Cricket Club (MCC) against Derbyshire in July 1905, he scored 101 in 110 minutes batting at number three. He went to Canada shortly after his first-class career finished, and was Canadian Amateur Billiards Champion in 1927 and 1928.
