= Kenneth Carlisle (cricketer, born 1882) =

English cricketer

Kenneth Methven Carlisle (7 August 1882 – 15 May 1967) was an English cricketer active from 1903 to 1905 who played for Oxford University. He was born in Lymm, Cheshire and died in Bardwell, Suffolk. He appeared in 30 first-class matches as a righthanded batsman who bowled right arm slow. He scored 1,211 runs with a highest score of 114 not out, one of two centuries, and took six wickets with a best performance of two for 39.

Carlisle was educated at Harrow School.
