= Warren Hale (cricketer) =

English cricketer

Personal information
- Full name: Warren Stormes Hale
- Born: 22 July 1862; Bures, Suffolk, England
- Died: 5 February 1934 (aged 71); Highgate, Middlesex, England
- Batting: Unknown

Domestic team information
- Years: Team
- 1897: Marylebone Cricket Club
- 1893: Middlesex

Career statistics
Competition	First-class
Matches	5
Runs scored	86
Batting average	10.75
100s/50s	–/–
Top score	36
Balls bowled	–
Wickets	–
Bowling average	–
5 wickets in innings	–
10 wickets in match	–
Best bowling	–
Catches/stumpings	1/–
- Source: Cricinfo, 17 March 2012

Warren Stormes Hale (22 July 1862 – 5 February 1934) was an English cricketer. Hale's batting style is unknown. He was born at Bures, Suffolk.

Hale made his first-class debut for Middlesex against Sussex in the 1893 County Championship. He made three further first-class appearances for the county in that season's County Championship, the last of which came against Lancashire. In his four first-class appearances for the county, he scored a total of 77 runs at an average of 12.83, with a high score of 36. He also made a single first-class appearance for the Marylebone Cricket Club against the Gentlemen of Philadelphia in 1897.

He died at Highgate, Middlesex, on 5 February 1934.
