= Charles Veal =

Welsh British Army officer and cricketer

Charles Lewis Veal (29 August 1876 – 1 June 1929) was a Welsh British Army officer and first-class cricketer active 1906–10 who played for Glamorgan and Marylebone Cricket Club (MCC). He was born in Bridgend and died in Kensington. He played in six first-class matches, scoring 145 runs with a highest score of 41 and held 4 catches.

Veal was commissioned a second lieutenant in the Welsh Regiment on 4 May 1898. He served in the Second Boer War with the 1st battalion of his regiment from late 1899, was promoted to lieutenant on 13 February 1900, and was severely wounded at the Battle of Paardeberg later the same month.
