= Gerald Howard-Smith =

English cricketer and solicitor

Personal information
- Full name: Gerald Howard-Smith
- Born: 21 January 1880; Earl's Court, Middlesex, England
- Died: 29 March 1916 (aged 36); Neuville-Saint-Vaast, Pas-de-Calais, France
- Batting: Right-handed
- Bowling: Right-arm fast

Domestic team information
- Years: Team
- 1908–1910: Staffordshire
- 1901–1903: Cambridge University
- 1900–1902: Marylebone Cricket Club

Career statistics
Competition	First-class
Matches	20
Runs scored	189
Batting average	11.11
100s/50s	–/–
Top score	23*
Balls bowled	2,075
Wickets	29
Bowling average	44.10
5 wickets in innings	1
10 wickets in match	–
Best bowling	6/23
Catches/stumpings	15/–
- Source: Cricinfo, 23 September 2018

Gerald Howard-Smith MC (21 January 1880 – 29 March 1916) was an English solicitor and cricketer, active in first-class cricket from 1900 to 1903.

== Early life and cricket career ==
Howard-Smith was born at Earl's Court on 21 January 1880 to Mary Beaumont O'Shaughnessy and her husband Philip Howard-Smith. He was educated at Eton College, before going onto study law at Trinity College, Cambridge. He made his debut in first-class cricket for the Marylebone Cricket Club (MCC) against Cambridge University at Fenner's in 1900. The following year he made his debut for Cambridge University in first-class matches against AJ Webbe's XI, taking a five wicket haul on debut with figures of 6/23 in AJ Webbe's XI's first-innings. From 1900 to 1903, he would make 20 appearances in first-class cricket; 17 for Cambridge University and three for the MCC. Playing primarily as a right-arm fast bowler, Howard-Smith was a reliable, if not overly effective bowler, taking 29 wickets at an average of 44.10, with one five wicket haul. He gained his Cambridge blue in 1903. While studying at Trinity he was the president of both Cambridge University Cricket Club and Cambridge University Athletic Club. Howard-Smith also won the varsity high jump against Oxford in 1901, 1902 and 1903, also competing in Canada.

After qualifying as a solicitor, he moved to Wolverhampton, where he joined the law firm Underhill, Thorneycroft & Smith and Neve, Co. He played club cricket locally for Wolverhampton Cricket Club, captaining the club. He was selected to play minor counties cricket for Staffordshire, playing in 1908 against Hertfordshire at Stoke-on-Trent, and once more in 1910 against Cheshire at Wolverhampton. These were his only appearances in the Minor Counties Championship.

== War service and death ==
Shortly after the outbreak of World War I, Howard-Smith was commissioned as a second lieutenant in the South Staffordshire Regiment. His unit moved to frontline in March 1915, where shortly thereafter he was promoted to lieutenant and became the battalion bombing officer. He was awarded the Military Cross on 14 January 1916, for bravery during the Actions of the Hohenzollern Redoubt. He was known as the "anarchist" in his battalion due to his left-wing views. During the course of the war he was wounded three times, the third time fatally during action at Neuville-Saint-Vaast, France. Stretchered from the battlefield whistling It's a Long Way to Tipperary, he died shortly thereafter from complications at a field hospital on 29 March 1916. He is buried at the Aubigny Communal Cemetery Extension and is commemorated at St Mary's Church, Bushbury.
