= Kenneth Nicholl =

English cricketer

Kenneth Iltyd Nicholl (13 February 1885 – 2 March 1952) was an English first-class cricketer active 1904–1921 who played for Middlesex and Marylebone Cricket Club (MCC). He was born in Marylebone; died in Famagusta.
