= Harold Scott (cricketer) =

English cricketer

Harold Eldon Scott (4 September 1907 – 29 January 1997) was an English cricketer active in 1937 who played for Sussex. He was born in Crowborough and died in Poole. He appeared in four first-class matches as a righthanded batsman who bowled right-arm fast medium. He scored 48 runs with a highest score of 16 and took two wickets with a best performance of one for 21.
