= Charles Luther (soldier) =

English cricketer and soldier (1880–1961)

Personal information
- Full name: Alan Charles Grenville Luther
- Born: 17 September 1880; Kensington, London, England
- Died: 23 June 1961 (aged 80); Staplemead, Curland, Somerset, England
- Batting: Right-handed

Domestic team information
- Years: Team
- 1908: Sussex

Career statistics
Competition	First-class
Matches	17
Runs scored	383
Batting average	16.65
100s/50s	0/0
Top score	42
Catches/stumpings	7/0
- Source: Cricinfo, 3 January 2016

Alan Charles Grenville Luther MC (17 September 1880 – 23 June 1961) was an English soldier and cricketer.

== Life and career ==
Educated at Rugby, where he appeared in the First XI cricket team in 1897 and 1898, Luther did his military training at Sandhurst. He joined the King's Own Yorkshire Light Infantry, and fought in the Second Boer War. He was promoted to the rank of captain. In August 1914, during the Battle of Le Cateau in the First World War, whilst lying wounded in no-man's-land, Luther was discovered by a German soldier who had lived in England before the war and appreciated the game of cricket; he took Luther to Le Cateau for treatment. Luther remained a prisoner of war until 1918. In 1920, promoted to major, he was awarded the Military Cross for valour at Le Cateau.

Luther played cricket at various levels until his late forties, mostly as a batsman, including nine first-class matches for Sussex in 1908 and eight for MCC from 1908 to 1911. His highest first-class score was 42, for MCC against Leicestershire in 1909. He played Minor Counties cricket for Berkshire in 1926 and 1927, scoring 101 out of a team total of 194 against Hertfordshire in 1927.

Luther retired from the army in the early 1920s. After a few years farming in South Africa, he returned to England and served as secretary of Berkshire County Cricket Club and assistant secretary of Surrey. At The Oval in the late 1920s, where he was a coach for Surrey, he organized the net sessions for young club members; Ronald Mason remembers him as "tall and willowy with a shock of grey hair on a handsome head that swayed engagingly as he walked".

During World War II, Luther served with the Home Guard, based at Canonteign in Devon. After a few more years in South Africa after the war, he returned to live the rest of his life near Taunton in Somerset.

Luther was also a prominent rackets player. He married Cecily Noel, the sister of a fellow officer from the Yorkshire Light Infantry, in London in July 1921. They had one son.
