= William East (cricketer) =

English cricketer

William East (1872–1926) was an English cricketer active from 1896 to 1914, played for Northamptonshire. He appeared in 163 first-class matches as a right arm medium pace bowler who was a right-handed batsman. East was born in Northampton on 29 August 1872 and died in Abington, Northamptonshire on 19 December 1926. He took 499 first-class wickets with a best performance of seven for 11 and he scored 4,012 runs with a highest score of 86 not out.
