= Septimus Kinneir =

English cricketer (1871–1928)

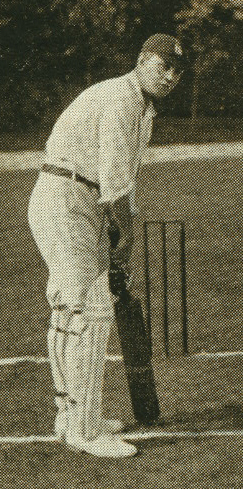

Personal information
- Full name: Septimus Paul Kinneir
- Batting: Left-handed
- Bowling: Right-arm medium

International information
- National side: England
- Only Test: 15 December 1911 v Australia

Career statistics
Competition	Test	First-class
Matches	1	312
Runs scored	52	15,641
Batting average	26.00	32.72
100s/50s	0/0	26/83
Top score	30	268*
Balls bowled	–	3,708
Wickets	–	48
Bowling average	–	31.08
5 wickets in innings	–	0
10 wickets in match	–	0
Best bowling	–	3/13
Catches/stumpings	0/–	181/–
- Source: Cricinfo, 10 September 2022

Septimus Paul Kinneir (13 May 1871 – 16 October 1928) was an English cricketer who played in one Test match in 1911 against Australia in Sydney. The tour had come as a reward for his most prolific season with the bat, when he scored 1,629 runs in 20 matches, including a career best 268 not out, at an average of 49.36. He was named one of Wisden's cricketers of the year in 1912. A left-handed batsman and occasional right arm bowler, Kinneir made his debut for Warwickshire in 1898 and played for the team until 1914.
