= David Osborne (cricketer) =

English cricketer (1879–1954)

David Robert Osborne (29 September 1879 – 1954) was an English first-class cricketer active 1905–14 who played for Middlesex, Marylebone Cricket Club (MCC) and Cambridge University. He was born in Perth, Western Australia; died in the Bahamas.
