= Arthur Litteljohn =

English cricketer (1881–1919)

Arthur Rieusett Litteljohn (1 April 1881 – 8 December 1919) was an English first-class cricketer active from 1905 to 1914 who played for Middlesex and Marylebone Cricket Club (MCC). He was born in Hanwell and died in Marylebone.
