= Noel Tagart =

English cricketer

Personal information
- Born: 24 December 1878; Paddington, London
- Died: 8 October 1913 (aged 34); Tunbridge Wells, Kent
- Batting: Right-handed

Domestic team information
- Years: Team
- 1900–1901: Gloucestershire
- Source: Cricinfo, 30 March 2014

Noël Ongley Tagart (24 December 1878 – 8 October 1913) was an English cricketer. He played for Gloucestershire between 1900 and 1901. Tagart was educated at Clifton College and Jesus College, Cambridge.
