= Joe Vine =

English cricketer

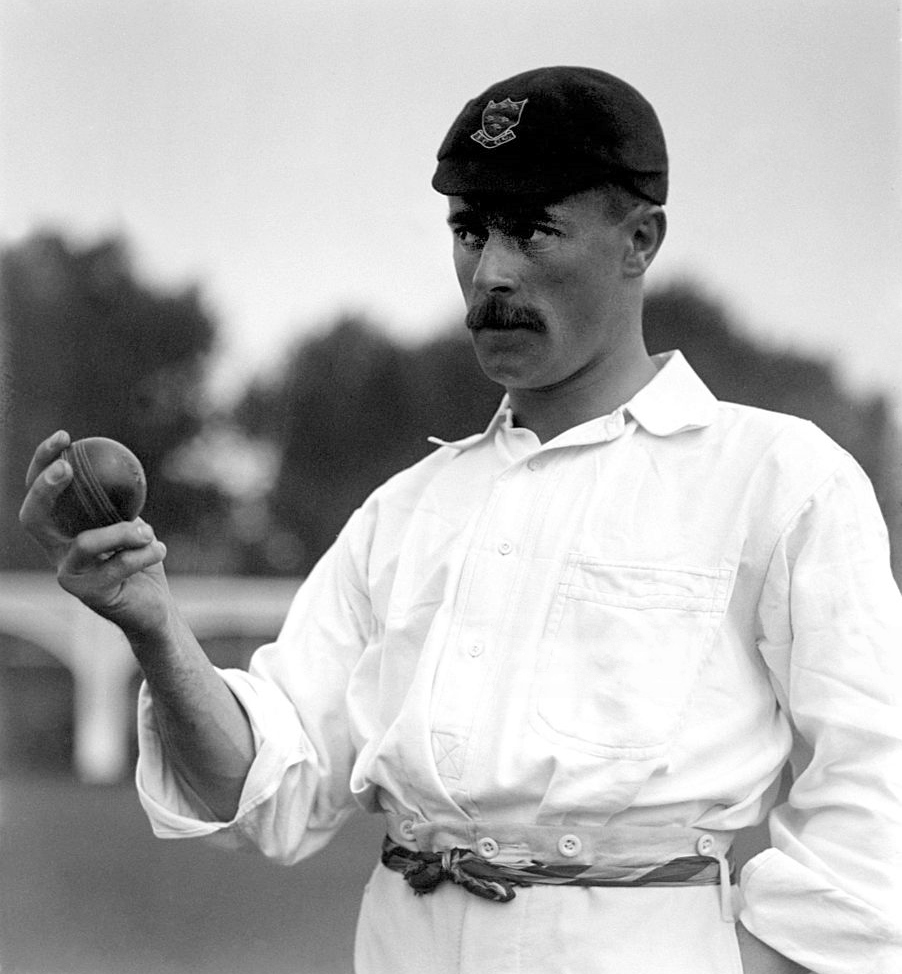
- Vine in about 1905

Personal information
- Born: 15 May 1875; Willingdon, Sussex, England
- Died: 25 April 1946 (aged 70); Aldrington, Hove, England
- Batting: Right-handed
- Bowling: Leg-break

International information
- National side: England
- Test debut: 9 February 1912 v Australia
- Last Test: 1 March 1912 v Australia

Career statistics
Competition	Test	First-class
Matches	2	547
Runs scored	46	25,171
Batting average	46.00	29.92
100s/50s	0/0	34/142
Top score	36	202
Balls bowled	–	39,307
Wickets	–	685
Bowling average	–	28.51
5 wickets in innings	–	27
10 wickets in match	–	3
Best bowling	–	8/68
Catches/stumpings	0/–	242/–
- Source: CricketArchive, 6 November 2022

Joseph Vine (15 May 1875 – 25 April 1946) was a professional cricketer, who played his first-class cricket for Sussex County Cricket Club and London County. Vine also played two Test matches for England and was named as one of the five Wisden Cricketers of the Year in 1906.

Vine's cricket career was not one of a rapid rise to fame. Although he played his first first-class match in 1896, it was not until 1900, after some tentative appearances in the three previous seasons, that he earned a regular place in the Sussex eleven. After that, however, he was indispensable. He was essentially a county cricketer, nearly all his work having been done for Sussex, but if, in addition to his batting and fielding, he had managed to retain his skill as a leg-break bowler it is quite likely that he would have played for England before he played his two Test matches in 1911/2. Already a dependable player, he made a great advance as a batsman in 1904 and during 1905 he was better than he had ever been before, scoring for Sussex in county matches alone over sixteen hundred runs. Good as his position is he would probably have been thought still more of if he had belonged to another county. A batsman would need to be great indeed to play on the same side as Ranjitsinhji and C.B. Fry, and not be overshadowed. His success as a batsman was largely gained in a series of first-wicket partnerships with Fry, and though he may at times carry caution a little too far and keep an undue check on his hitting powers, the result is nearly always so satisfactory that it would be sheer hypercriticism to find fault with him. As an outfield Vine has not the wonderful pick-up of Denton, but in every other respect was in the highest class, and in the course of a season at the beginning of the twentieth century, perhaps no one saved a larger number of runs.

In total Vine played 547 first-class matches, which included 421 consecutive appearances for Sussex. Soon after retiring from county cricket Joe Vine became coach at Brighton College, an office he held for many years. He died aged 70 in 1946.
