= Walter Druce =

English cricketer

Personal information
- Full name: Walter George Druce
- Born: September 16, 1872; Denmark Hill, London, England
- Died: January 8, 1963 (aged 90); Sherborne, Dorset, England

Domestic team information
- Years: Team
- 1894–1896: Cambridge University
- Marylebone Cricket Club
- 1894–1913: Various amateur teams

Walter George Druce (16 September 1872 – 8 January 1963) was an English cricketer who played in first-class cricket matches for Cambridge University, the Marylebone Cricket Club (MCC) and other amateur teams between 1894 and 1913. He was born at Denmark Hill in London (then counted as part of Surrey) and died at Sherborne, Dorset.
