= List of Middlesex County Cricket Club List A cricketers =

This is a list of the cricketers who have represented Middlesex CCC in List A cricket since 1963.

Players are listed in strict alphabetical order, as of 4 September 2024

== A ==
- Abdul Razzaq (2002–2003) : Abdul Razzaq
- Ajit Agarkar (2004) : A. B. Agarkar
- David Alleyne (1999–2003) : D. Alleyne
- Martin Andersson (2021-2024) : M. K. Andersson

== B ==
- George Bailey (2016) : G. J. Bailey
- Andrew Balbirnie (2015) : A. Balbirnie
- Ethan Bamber (2021-2024) : E. R. Bamber
- Graham Barlow (1970–1986) : G. D. Barlow
- Chris Batt (1998–2000) : C. J. Batt
- Don Bennett (1963–1969) : D. Bennett
- Gareth Berg (2008–2013) : G. K. Berg
- Melvyn Betts (2004–2006) : M. M. Betts
- Sam Black (1970–1973) : C. J. R. Black
- Ian Blanchett (1997–1999) : I. N. Blanchett
- Timothy Bloomfield (1997–2004) : T. F. Bloomfield
- Mike Brearley (1965–1982) : J. M. Brearley
- Henry Brookes (2024) : H. J. H. Brookes
- Keith Brown (1985–1998) : K. R. Brown
- Michael Brown (2002) : M. J. Brown
- David Burton (2009) : David Burton
- Roland Butcher (1974–1990) : R. O. Butcher

== C ==
- John Carr (1983–1996) : J. D. Carr
- Hilton Cartwright (2018) : H. W. R. Cartwright
- Varun Chopra (2021) : V. Chopra
- Stuart Clark (2004–2005) : S. R. Clark
- Ted Clark (1963–1976) : E. A. Clark
- Alan Coleman (2001–2002) : A. J. Coleman
- Pedro Collins (2010) : P. T. Collins
- Corey Collymore (2011–2013) : C. D. Collymore
- Nick Compton (2001–2017) : N. R. D. Compton
- Alan Connolly (1969–1970) : A. N. Connolly
- Colin Cook (1981–1984) : C. R. Cook
- Simon Cook (1997–2004) : S. J. Cook
- Noah Cornwell (2024) : N. B. Cornwell
- Norman Cowans (1980/81–1993) : N. G. Cowans
- Joe Cracknell (2021-2024) : J. B. Cracknell
- Steven Crook (2011–2012) : S. P. Crook
- Blake Cullen (2023-2024) : B. C. Cullen

== D ==
- Jamie Dalrymple (2000–2011) : J. W. M. Dalrymple
- Wayne Daniel (1977–1987) : W. W. Daniel
- Josh Davey (2010–2013) : J. H. Davey
- Jack Davies (2021-2024) : J. L. B. Davies
- Joe Dawes (2003) : J. H. Dawes
- Josh de Caires (2021-2024) : J. M. de Caires
- Joe Denly (2012–2014) : J. L. Denly
- Neil Dexter (2009–2014) : N. J. Dexter
- Paul Downton (1980–1991) : P. R. Downton
- Colin Drybrough (1963–1964) : C. D. Drybrough
- Keith Dutch (1995–2000) : K. P. Dutch

== E ==
- Phil Edmonds (1971–1987) : P. H. Edmonds
- Ricardo Ellcock (1989–1991) : R. M. Ellcock
- Richard Ellis (1981–1983) : R. G. P. Ellis
- John Emburey (1975–1995) : J. E. Emburey
- Stephen Eskinazi (2018–2022) : S. S. Eskinazi
- Danny Evans (2008–2009) : D. Evans

== F ==
- Paul Farbrace (1990–1995) : P. Farbrace
- Ricky Fay (1995–1997) : R. A. Fay
- Norman Featherstone (1969–1979) : N. G. Featherstone
- Mark Feltham (1993–1996) : M. A. Feltham
- Nathan Fernandes (2024) : N. S. Fernandes
- Steven Finn (2007–2019) : S. T. Finn
- Paul Fisher (1978) : P. B. Fisher
- Stephen Fleming (2001) : S. P. Fleming
- David Follett (1995–1996) : D. Follett
- James Franklin (2015–2018) : J. E. C. Franklin
- Alastair Fraser (1986–1998) : A. G. J. Fraser
- Angus Fraser (1985–2002) : A. R. C. Fraser
- James Fuller (2016–2018) : J. K. Fuller

== G ==
- Bob Gale (1963–1966) : R. A. Gale
- Ben Gannon (2003) : B. W. Gannon
- Mike Gatting (1974–1998) : M. W. Gatting
- Adam Gilchrist (2010) : A. C. Gilchrist
- Billy Godleman (2007–2009) : B. A. Godleman
- Larry Gomes (1973–1976) : H. A. Gomes
- David Goodchild (1998–1999) : D. J. Goodchild
- Ian Gould (1975–1980/81) : I. J. Gould
- Toby Greatwood (2021-2022) : T. L. Greatwood
- Nick Gubbins (2014–2019) : N. R. T. Gubbins

== H ==
- Aftab Habib (1993-1994) : A. Habib
- Peter Handscomb (2021) : P. S. P. Handscomb
- Gordon Harris (1994) : G. A. R. Harris
- James Harris (2013–2021) : J. A. R. Harris
- Max Harris (2022) : M. B. Harris
- Mike Harris (1967–1968) : M. J. Harris
- Jason Harrison (1994–1996) : J. C. Harrison
- Desmond Haynes (1989–1994) : D. L. Haynes
- David Hays (1976) : D. L. Hays
- Nantie Hayward (2004–2005) : M. Hayward
- Dean Headley (1991–1992) : D. W. Headley
- Tom Helm (2013–2019) : T. G. Helm
- Jason Hemstock (1990) : J. R. Hemstock
- Tyron Henderson (2008–2009) : T. Henderson
- Bob Herkes (1978–1979) : R. Herkes
- Bob Herman (1965–1971) : R. S. Herman
- Jamie Hewitt (1995–2001) : J. P. Hewitt
- Ryan Higgins (2014-2024) : R. F. Higgins
- Max Holden (2018–2022) : M. D. E. Holden
- Luke Hollman (2021-2024) : L. B. K. Hollman
- Ron Hooker (1963–1969) : R. W. Hooker
- Jeffris Hopkins (1969–1971) : J. D. Hopkins
- Phillip Hughes (2009) : P. J. Hughes
- Simon Hughes (1980–1991) : S. P. Hughes
- Thos Hunt (2001–2002) : T. A. Hunt
- Ian Hutchinson (1987–1991) : I. J. F. Hutchinson
- Paul Hutchison (2004–2005) : P. M. Hutchison
- Ben Hutton (1999–2007) : B. L. Hutton

== I ==
- Imran Tahir (2003) : Imran Tahir
- Anthony Ireland (2011–2012) : A. J. Ireland

== J ==
- Kevan James (1980–1984) : K. D. James
- Richard Johnson (1993–2007) : R. L. Johnson
- Allan Jones (1976-1979) : A. A. Jones
- Ian Jones (2002) : I. Jones
- Keith Jones (1969–1974) : K. V. Jones
- Ed Joyce (1999–2008) : E. C. Joyce
- Junaid Khan (2015) : Junaid Khan

== K ==
- Jacques Kallis (1997) : J. H. Kallis
- Murali Kartik (2007–2009) : M. Kartik
- Ishaan Kaushal (2023-2024) : I. Kaushal
- Matthew Keech (1991–1993) : M. Keech
- Chad Keegan (2001–2007) : C. B. Keegan
- Nick Kemp (1982) : N. J. Kemp
- Richard Kettleborough (1998–1999) : R. A. Kettleborough
- Lance Klusener (2004) : L. Klusener
- Sven Koenig (2002) : S. G. Koenig

== L ==
- Tim Lamb (1974–1977) : T. M. Lamb
- Justin Langer (1998–2000) : J. L. Langer
- Aaron Laraman (1998–2002) : A. W. Laraman
- Harry Latchman (1969–1971) : A. H. Latchman
- David Ling (1967) : D. J. Ling
- Adam London (2009-2012) : A. B. London
- Johann Louw (2006) : J. Louw
- Andrew Lyon (1981) : A. W. Lyon

== M ==
- Neil MacLaurin (1986-1988) : N. R. C. MacLaurin
- Dawid Malan (2008–2019) : D. J. Malan
- Pieter Malan (2022) : P. J. Malan
- Maurice Manasseh (1967) : M. Manasseh
- Dennis Marriott (1972–1974) : D. A. Marriott
- Neil Martin (1997–1998) : N. D. Martin
- Rajesh Maru (1980–1980/81) : R. J. Maru
- John Maunders (2001) : J. K. Maunders
- Brendon McCullum (2016) : B. B. McCullum
- Glenn McGrath (2004) : G. D. McGrath
- Bill Merry (1979–1983) : W. G. Merry
- Colin Metson (1981–1986) : C. P. Metson
- Andrew Miller (1984–1987) : A. J. T. Miller
- Scott Moffat (1997) : S. P. Moffat
- Mohammad Ali (2005–2006) : Mohammad Ali
- Dermott Monteith (1981–1981) : J. D. Monteith
- Eoin Morgan (2005–2019) : E. J. G. Morgan
- Alan Moss (1963–1968) : A. E. Moss
- John Murray (1963–1975) : J. T. Murray
- Tim Murtagh (2007–2022) : T. J. Murtagh

== N ==
- Dirk Nannes (2008) : D. P. Nannes
- David Nash (1995–2009) : D. C. Nash
- Dion Nash (1995) : D. J. Nash
- Andrew Needham (1987–1988) : A. Needham
- Scott Newman (2010) : S. A. Newman
- Ashley Noffke (2002–2003) : A. A. Noffke

== O ==
- Iain O'Brien (2010) : I. E. O'Brien

== P ==
- Peter Parfitt (1963–1972) : P. H. Parfitt
- Ashok Sitaram Patel (1977–1978) : A. S. Patel
- Ravi Patel (2010–2018) : R. H. Patel
- Irfan Pathan (2005) : I. K. Pathan
- Christopher Payne (1970) : C. J. Payne
- Hugh Pearman (1969–1972) : H. Pearman
- Chris Peploe (2004–2007) : C. T. Peploe
- Vernon Philander (2008) : V. D. Philander
- Harry Podmore (2014) : H. W. Podmore
- Jason Pooley (1990–1998) : J. C. Pooley
- Stephen Poulter (1978) : S. J. Poulter
- John Price (1963–1975) : J. S. E. Price

== R ==
- Toby Radford (1993–1995) : T. A. Radford
- Clive Radley (1965–1987) : C. T. Radley
- Mark Ramprakash (1987–2000) : M. R. Ramprakash
- Umer Rashid (1995–1998) : U. B. A. Rashid
- Ollie Rayner (2011–2017) : O. P. Rayner
- Alan Richardson (2005–2009) : A. Richardson
- Sam Robson (2008–2024) : S. D. Robson
- Chris Rogers (2011–2014) : C. J. L. Rogers
- Toby Roland-Jones (2010–2024) : T. S. Roland-Jones
- Graham Rose (1983–1986) : G. D. Rose
- Mike Roseberry (1985–2001) : M. A. Roseberry
- Nigel Ross (1974–1977) : N. P. D. Ross
- Adam Rossington (2012–2014) : A. M. Rossington
- Sid Russell (1964) : S. E. J. Russell
- Eric Russell (1964–1972) : W. E. Russell

== S ==
- Gurjit Sandhu (2012–2015) : G. S. Sandhu
- Tom Scollay (2010-2012) : T. E. Scollay
- Ben Scott (2004–2011) : B. J. M. Scott
- George Scott (2015–2019) : G. F. B. Scott
- Mike Selvey (1972–1982) : M. W. W. Selvey
- Tim Selwood (1969–1973) : T. Selwood
- Owais Shah (1995–2010) : O. A. Shah
- Kevin Shine (1994) : K. J. Shine
- Chris Silverwood (2006–2009) : C. E. W. Silverwood
- John Simpson (2009–2023) : J. A. Simpson
- Robin Sims (1992–1993) : R. J. Sims
- Wilf Slack (1978–1988) : W. N. Slack
- Ed Smith (2005–2008) : E. T. Smith
- Michael J. Smith (1965–1980) : M. J. Smith
- Tom Smith (2010–2013) : T. M. J. Smith
- Nathan Sowter (2016–2019) : N. A. Sowter
- Wes Stewart (1966–1968) : R. W. Stewart
- Paul Stirling (2011–2019) : P. R. Stirling
- Mark Stoneman (2022-2024) : M. D. Stoneman
- Andrew Strauss (1997–2010) : A. J. Strauss
- Michael Sturt (1971) : M. O. C. Sturt
- Scott Styris (2005–2006) : S. B. Styris
- Jamie Sykes (1983–1989) : J. F. Sykes
- Steve Sylvester (1991–1992) : S. A. Sylvester

== T ==
- Charles Taylor (1991–1994) : C. W. Taylor
- Ross Taylor (2019) : L. R. P. L. Taylor
- Neil Taylor (1990) : N. R. Taylor
- Jackson Thompson (2010) : J. G. Thompson
- Jeff Thomson (1981) : J. R. Thomson
- Fred Titmus (1963–1976) : F. J. Titmus
- Keith Tomlins (1978–1985) : K. P. Tomlins
- Kabir Toor (2009) : K. S. Toor
- Peter Trego (2005) : P. D. Trego
- Phil Tufnell (1988–2001) : P. C. R. Tufnell

== U ==
- Shaun Udal (2008–2010) : S. D. Udal

== V ==
- Chaminda Vaas (2007) : W. P. U. J. C. Vaas
- Daan van Bunge (2004) : D. L. S. van Bunge
- Vintcent van der Bijl (1980) : V. A. P. van der Bijl
- Martin Vernon (1974–1976) : M. J. Vernon
- Adam Voges (2013–2017) : A. C. Voges

== W ==
- Anthony Waite (1962–1964) : A. C. Waite
- Thilan Walallawita (2021-2022) : T. N. Wallallawita
- David Warner 2010 : D. A. Warner
- Paul Weekes (1990–2006) : P. N. Weekes
- Peter Wellings (1996–1997) : P. E. Wellings
- Robin Weston (2000–2003) : R. M. S. Weston
- Chris Whelan (2004–2007) : C. D. Whelan
- Bob White (1963–1965) : R. A. White
- Robbie White (2018-2024) : R. G. White
- Chris Whiteside (1975) : C. J. Whiteside
- Oliver Wilkin (2013) : O. Wilkin
- Neil Williams (1982–1994) : N. F. Williams
- Robbie Williams (2007–2012) : R. E. M. Williams
- Chris Wright (2004–2007) : C. J. C. Wright

== Y ==
- Umesh Yadav (2022) : U. T. Yadav
- Richard Yeabsley (1994–1995) : R. S. Yeabsley
