= Middlesex County Cricket Club in 2005 =

2005 season of an English cricket team

Middlesex Crusaders
2005 season
- Captain: Ben Hutton
- Ground(s): Lord's; Southgate; Uxbridge; Richmond

Middlesex County Cricket Club in 2005 played their cricket in Division One of the County Championship and Division Two of the totesport League. They started the season at 9–1 to win the County Championship title.

In their first fixture of 2005 they beat Nottinghamshire comfortably in a rain-affected Sunday League game, and followed it up with a rain-affected draw in the County Championship against the same team. The second Sunday League game saw a thumping win against Lancashire at Lord's. They were then defeated in the Championship by Warwickshire County Cricket Club, before defeating Worcestershire in the Sunday League on 1 May to maintain their 100% record in the Sunday League. Then on 4 May they beat Northumberland to progress to the Second Round of the C&G Trophy.

A defeat by Hampshire and a win against Gloucestershire then followed in the County Championship, before their unbeaten run in the National League was ended by hungry Hampshire Hawks. On 17 May they were eliminated from the C&G Trophy at the Second Round stage by Northamptonshire, and yet another one-day game without a win came at Gloucestershire, where rain ended the game prematurely. They then played a Championship game against Sussex, who just held on for a draw, leaving Middlesex seventh in Division One at the end of May.

Middlesex then lost a friendly match against the students of Cambridge UCCE, and also lost their table lead in the National League with a loss to Essex. The next Championship game was a high-scoring draw with Surrey, before keeping up their one-day title challenge with a win over Northamptonshire, taking revenge for their loss in the C&G Trophy. In a high-scoring match at Southgate, they beat Glamorgan despite losing more wickets, and on the same pitch the following day they amassed 314 to beat Nottinghamshire in the National League.

Middlesex also got good results in the Twenty20 Cup group stage, as they avoided the rain, but they lost twice to Surrey. They did have the fortune of meeting a dejected Kent side twice, beating them both times, and also beat Hampshire and Essex – enough to see them through to the quarter-finals on more wins. That was followed up by a seven-wicket win in the Championship over Hampshire, before their luck ran out, and they lost a high-scoring match to Gloucestershire in the National League before saying goodbye to the Twenty20 Cup with a 19-run loss to defending champions Leicestershire. A tour to Wales followed, winning the one-day game against Glamorgan in style before playing a Championship game on the same ground, which they also won comfortably.

August started with a three-wicket loss to Warwickshire, which saw them crash into sixth place in the Championship table, and another loss to Essex followed, this time in the National League. In the Championship, they set Nottinghamshire 530 to win on the fourth day at Trent Bridge, but that day was rained off, resulting in a draw. Then, Northamptonshire travelled to Lord's and beat Middlesex by 14 runs in the National League.

On 16 August, Middlesex travelled to Hove in Sussex, only to be slaughtered by their Pakistani imports. The match with Sussex was over inside two days and Middlesex were beaten by an innings and 232 runs, the highest margin of defeat suffered by any team in the entire Championship season. Then followed a four-day break, before they drew with Kent and Gloucestershire in quick succession. After August had given them no victories, September started brightly, as the recently crowned C&G Trophy champions Hampshire were defeated by two wickets. Their seventh Championship draw of the season, against Kent at Lord's, meant that their match with Surrey at The Oval on 21 September looked to be a relegation final, with the loser going down into Division Two.

However, there was also the National League to think about, and Middlesex won the first of two successive week-end matches before the Championship clash with Surrey, beating Glamorgan by five runs. The last one-day match of the season was also a win, a 44-run one over Lancashire, securing second place behind the dominant Essex. Their last match of the season was a Championship game with Surrey, and Middlesex needed to limit Surrey's point-gap to 14. After earning 5 batting points on the first day, and declaring to limit Surrey to two bowling points, Middlesex only needed one bowling point to secure continued presence in Division Two. Indian spinner Yogesh Golwalkar took the final wicket, and despite losing by an innings and 39 runs, Middlesex stayed up.

== Players ==
- Scott Styris
- Nantie Hayward
- Melvyn Betts
- Nick Compton
- Jamie Dalrymple
- Billy Godleman
- Paul Hutchison
- Ed Joyce
- Chad Keegan
- Eoin Morgan
- David Nash
- Chris Peploe
- Boyd Rankin
- Alan Richardson
- Ben Scott
- Owais Shah
- Ed Smith
- Andrew Strauss
- Paul Weekes
- Chris Whelan
- Chris Wright

== Tables ==
=== Championship ===
2005 County Championship – Division One
Pos	Team	Pld	W	D	L	Pen	BP	Pts
1	Nottinghamshire	16	9	4	3	0	94	236
2	Hampshire	16	9	4	3	0.5	92	233.5
3	Sussex	16	7	6	3	0	102	224
4	Warwickshire	16	8	3	5	0.5	86	209.5
5	Kent	16	6	7	3	8.5	99	202.5
6	Middlesex	16	4	7	5	0.5	98	181.5
7	Surrey	16	4	9	3	8.5	97	180.5
8	Gloucestershire	16	1	5	10	2	72	104
9	Glamorgan	16	1	1	14	0	71	88.5

=== totesport League ===
2005 totesport League – Division One
Pos	Team	Pld	W	L	NR	Pts
1	Essex Eagles	16	13	1	2	56
2	Middlesex Crusaders	16	10	5	1	42
3	Northamptonshire Steelbacks	16	7	7	2	32
4	Glamorgan Dragons	16	6	6	4	32
5	Nottinghamshire Outlaws	16	6	7	3	30
6	Lancashire Lightning	16	6	9	1	26
7	Gloucestershire Gladiators	16	6	9	1	26
8	Worcestershire Royals	16	5	10	1	22
9	Hampshire Hawks	16	5	10	1	22

== Match details ==
=== Nottinghamshire v Middlesex (17 April) ===
Middlesex (4pts) beat Nottinghamshire (0pts) by 35 runs (D/L method)

At Trent Bridge, Chad Keegan took career best figures of 6 for 33 as Nottinghamshire Outlaws were bowled out for 173. By the time Keegan had finished they were 75 for 6, but the tail wagged. Middlesex Crusaders scored 91 for 0 off 21.3 overs, thanks to a half-century from Paul Weekes, when rain brought an end to the match. Middlesex were comfortable winners on the Duckworth–Lewis method. (BBC scorecard)

=== Middlesex v Nottinghamshire (20–23 April) ===
Middlesex (9pts) drew with Nottinghamshire (12pts)

The first day at Lord's saw Nottinghamshire, who were put in to bat, progress to 399 for 6, thanks to 117 not out from Australian David Hussey. Alan Richardson starred for Middlesex, taking 5 wickets on his county debut.

Nottinghamshire batted on to 546 all out on the second day, despite losing Hussey for just one more added run. Paul Franks scored a century, and Richardson increased his tally to 7 for 113. In response to this, Middlesex fared poorly, whilst fast-medium bowler Greg Smith removed the top order. The home side finished on 167 for 6, but were rescued on the third day when Irishman Ed Joyce took his score up to 192. Middlesex finished on 345, 201 behind. Stephen Fleming chose not to enforce the follow-on, and amassed a lead of 413 when they declared on 212 for 5. Maybe the Notts bowlers were tired, but it seemed like negative play with rain predicted for the fourth day.

And the rain did come, with only 57 overs possible. Middlesex had progressed to 158 for 2 before play was abandoned, which suggested Notts might have struggled to win anyway. (Cricinfo scorecard)

=== Middlesex v Lancashire (24 April) ===
Middlesex (4pts) beat Lancashire (0pts) by 69 runs

Lancashire Lightning won the toss at Lord's and put Middlesex Crusaders in. This looked the right decision as Lancashire's seam and swing bowling attack saw Middlesex fall to 6 for 3, and then 37 for 6. The Crusaders were then rescued by James Dalrymple, who took 81 off 82 balls to take them to 210 for 9 in their 45 overs.

Lancashire's reply started to come unstuck when both openers, Stuart Law and Iain Sutcliffe, fell in successive balls with the score on 23. The game saw the return of Andrew Flintoff, back after his operation and playing just as a batsman. But he couldn't stop the rot and made only 17 before falling lbw to Scott Styris. The Lightning were finally all out for 141 and Middlesex completed their second win in two matches. All eleven bowlers used in the match got at least one wicket, but the most prolific wicket-taker, Kyle Hogg, also conceded the most runs. (Cricinfo scorecard)

=== Warwickshire v Middlesex (27–30 April) ===
Warwickshire (22pts) beat Middlesex (5pts) by seven wickets

Middlesex batted first at Edgbaston. Their Irish left-hander, Ed Joyce, was the anchor of the innings making 92 as he took his side from 56 for 4 to 253 for 7. He was assisted by a quick-fire half-century from Scott Styris, an innings somewhat out of pace with his team-mates' innings. They were finally all out for 298. Warwickshire lost 2 wickets in scoring 18 by the close.

Only 68 overs were possible on the second day. Ian Bell dominated, setting out his case for an England call-up, with 143 not out. He said, "If I was to play for England, I'd bat anywhere I was told to bat. Just to play would be great. I'm batting at three for Warwickshire and enjoying it. I know there's some competition [for Test places] and there's a lot being talked about it. I've just got to concentrate on scoring as many runs as I can for Warwickshire." No other player scored so freely though, and Warwickshire ended the day on 277 for 6.

On the third day, England spin bowler Ashley Giles, who notched up 62, stayed with him. Bell was finally run out for a seven-hour 231 as Warwickshire closed on 430. Giles then starred with the ball, taking two wickets as Middlesex finished on 137 for 3 at stumps. On the fourth day, Giles tripled his tally to end with 6, as Middlesex faltered to 246 despite 63 from Joyce. That left Warwickshire needing only 115 to win, and despite Paul Hutchison taking two wickets, Bell led his team to a seven-wicket victory by scoring 47. (Cricinfo scorecard)

=== Middlesex v Worcestershire (1 May) ===
Middlesex (4pts) beat Worcestershire (0pts) by 3 wickets (D/L method)

The Worcestershire Royals put on 201 for 7 in their 44 overs, with David Leatherdale making 72 from 83 balls in an innings in which Graeme Hick became the heaviest scorer in the Sunday League's history. New Zealander Scott Styris took 3 wickets for Middlesex Crusaders, and kept the visitors from scoring freely. Middlesex made heavy work of overturning this total, even though they had 104 on the board before the first wicket fell. But ultimately they retained their 100% Sunday League record with 3 wickets and 1 over left. (BBC scorecard)

=== Northumberland v Middlesex (3–4 May) ===
Middlesex beat Northumberland by 10 wickets to progress to Round Two of the C&G Trophy

Rain meant there was no play on the first day at Jesmond. On a second day where plenty of runs were available, Northumberland put on 206 for 8 with Stephen Humble making an unbeaten 88 from number 8 in the batting order. Middlesex in the shape of Ed Smith and Paul Weekes knocked them off in just 31.3 overs. Weekes ended up with 106, Middlesex' first List A century of the season. (BBC scorecard)

=== Hampshire v Middlesex (6–9 May) ===
Hampshire (19pts) beat Middlesex (5pts) by 64 runs

Hampshire won a closely fought match at the Rose Bowl by 64 runs despite the efforts with the ball by New Zealand and Middlesex all-rounder Scott Styris, who took his first ten-wicket haul of his career on a pitch that quickly deteriorated and in Styris' own words was "junk". With former England wicket-keeper John Crawley starring in the first innings, making a controlled 84 before being ninth out to Alan Richardson. There were disappointments for England fans, though, who had hoped that Kevin Pietersen would find some form – instead, he was out for a 10-ball duck in the first innings. Hampshire made 275 in their first innings, Alan Richardson and Scott Styris taking four wickets each.

Middlesex' reply would have been a sorry one but for a big partnership between Owais Shah (83) and Irish left-hander Ed Joyce (70), who continued his great form in the Championship, passing 400 runs in his third match of the season. The pair were the only ones who passed 35, but their fourth-wicket partnership of 166 was the highest in the match. However, leg spinner Shane Warne got the better of both of them in the end, as Joyce gave a return catch and Shah was stumped off the bowling of the Australian. With Hampshire losing two quick wickets to be 28 for 2 at the close, the match hung in the balance, with nightwatchman Billy Taylor on 0 and Australian batsman Simon Katich on 1.

Billy Taylor, however, played a special knock. Lasting 116 balls, he scored only 9 runs, but his stamina proved invaluable. He forged good partnerships with Katich and Crawley, giving Hampshire a good platform to hit loose from. Wicketkeeper Nic Pothas was top-scorer with 65, but Zimbabwe all-rounder Sean Ervine (30) and Dimitri Mascarenhas (44) also chipped in to lift Hampshire to 304. A spirited reply from Middlesex was always tampered by the Hampshire bowlers chipping away at their line-up patiently, and despite 52 from former Kent batsman Ed Smith, Middlesex were defeated as Chris Tremlett ripped out the tail, ending with four for 59 – just outperformed by Warne, who took four for 58. (Cricinfo scorecard)

=== Middlesex v Gloucestershire (11–13 May) ===
Middlesex (21pts) beat Gloucestershire (4pts) by 340 runs

Middlesex won convincingly at Lord's. Ed Joyce continued with his good form, top-scoring with 75 as Middlesex made 390 all out, their highest score of the season so far, on the first day. Gloucestershire faced out a maiden over before the close of play. On the second day, in conditions still favouring the batsmen, 5 wickets from Alan Richardson and 4 from Melvyn Betts saw the visitors crumble to 232. Only Craig Spearman passed 30 for Gloucestershire, as he spent 144 minutes making 69. Middlesex were 93 for 3 in their second innings at stumps.

Middlesex batted for another 62 overs, allowing Owais Shah to make his century, and Ed Joyce 93, before declaring on 342 for 6, leaving Gloucestershire a theoretical 501 to win. Their batting was worse than in their first innings as another 3 wickets from Richardson and 4 from Betts saw them all out for a miserable 160. (Cricinfo scorecard)

=== Middlesex v Hampshire (15 May) ===
Hampshire (4pts) beat Middlesex (0pts) by 105 runs

Seldom has a captain regretted his decision as much as Ben Hutton of Middlesex Crusaders must have done when he chose to field on a flat Lord's against Hampshire Hawks. Before the match, Middlesex were top of the table, Hampshire rock bottom. It didn't show. Kevin Pietersen played a typical knock, scoring 80 off 50 balls with six sixes, while Dimitri Mascarenhas got himself a 26-ball fifty as Hampshire amassed 353 for 8 off 45 overs – a run rate of 7.84. Despite Owais Shah's 89, Middlesex were never in it, and crumbled to 248 all out in just 39 overs – Pietersen bowling the last over, conceding a single off the first ball before bowling four dot balls to Paul Hutchison and having him caught by captain Shane Warne on the last ball – meaning that Pietersen now had figures of 1–0–1–1 in one-day cricket. It turned out to be his only List A over all season. (Cricinfo scorecard)

=== Middlesex v Northamptonshire (17 May) ===
Northamptonshire beat Middlesex by 19 runs to progress to the Quarter-Finals of the C&G Trophy

Northamptonshire batted first at Lord's. Their top order performed well, with Usman Afzaal making 75 off 120 balls, and useful contributions from Bilal Shafayat (46) and David Sales (40). However, once they were out, 7 wickets fell for 40 runs, leaving them on 215 for 9, before Rob White smacked 36 to lift the visitors to 238. Middlesex got off to a good start, reaching 148 for 2 and 168 for 3, as opener Paul Weekes scored a century. However, then Damien Wright took 4 wickets for 1 in 7 balls, as Middlesex collapsed in more spectacular fashion than the visitors, losing their last 6 wickets for 8 runs. (Cricinfo scorecard)

=== Gloucestershire v Middlesex (22 May) ===
Match abandoned – Gloucestershire (2pts), Middlesex (2pts)

Just as at nearby Taunton in Somerset, where Somerset were playing Lancashire in the Championship, rain hit Bristol heavily, as Gloucestershire Gladiators were hoping to climb out of the bottom of the table. The visitors from Middlesex Crusaders were struggling, faltering to 95 for 5 after 21 overs with only Owais Shah hitting more than 20 – he made a half-century. Then rain intervened, and Gloucestershire were set 87 in 13 overs – however, when seven overs of the chase was over and Gloucestershire had made 40 for 2, rain stopped play again and the game was called off completely. (Cricinfo scorecard)

=== Sussex v Middlesex (25–28 May) ===
Middlesex (12pts) drew with Sussex (10pts)

James Kirtley took his first five-wicket-haul of the season at Hove to peg back Middlesex in a match where Middlesex were otherwise well in control. Nine of their batsmen went into double figures, Irishman Ed Joyce making another fine score with 82, but Kirtley's six for 80 saved some of their blushes. In reply, Irfan Pathan dug out two Sussex wickets early to give Middlesex a good chance, but Chris Adams, the captain, fought back with a fine 72 while 33-year-old Zimbabwe exile Murray Goodwin made 67, and a good fight-back from the lower-order lifted Sussex to 332. Mushtaq Ahmed plugged away to make 57, while Kirtley helped out with a 95-ball 14, to defy Pathan, who nevertheless got fine figures of four for 81 in his debut in England.

Jason Lewry then took six Middlesex wickets for 65 runs, reducing them to 244, although if it hadn't been Jamie Dalrymple's (65) and Paul Weekes' (71) partnership of 140 for the sixth wicket, things would have looked even nastier for Middlesex. In reply, Sussex were cautious in their chase of 314, but a big partnership between Robin Montgomerie and Murray Goodwin nearly won it for them. However, New Zealand all-rounder Scott Styris took four Sussex wickets for 79, and Alan Richardson took four for 38 – including Goodwin and skipper Adams. Sussex lost four wickets for 17 runs to crash to 280 for 6, but Kirtley and Lewry held out as Sussex finished 28 runs short of a victory and Middlesex finished one wicket short of victory in this bottom-fight. (BBC scorecard)

=== Worcestershire v Middlesex (30 May) ===
Middlesex (4pts) beat Worcestershire (0pts) by 32 runs

Middlesex Crusaders were lifted by a massive 160-run partnership between New Zealand all-rounder Scott Styris and former England Test player Ed Smith as they assembled 224 for 7 in a rain-shortened match at Worcester, in which Worcestershire's bowlers delivered six maiden overs. However, Worcestershire Royals' reply were hampered by wickets falling everywhere, along with lack of responsibility to keep the run-rate up, as Vikram Solanki made 40 off 66 balls and Zander de Bruyn 55 off 74 – too slow to chase 225 in 44 overs. When Gareth Batty was run out, a rot set in, as Worcestershire lost five wickets for 15 runs and were forced to crawl to 192 for 9. (Cricinfo scorecard)

=== Cambridge UCCE v Middlesex (1–3 June) ===
Cambridge UCCE beat Middlesex by 2 wickets

Cambridge UCCE's last game against county opposition of the season was against Middlesex at Fenner's, and the students recorded their first first class victory of the year. In 45 overs of possible play on the first day, Middlesex amassed 182 for 2, with Benjamin Hutton making an unbeaten century. They lost Hutton for 111 on the second morning, but pushed onward to 273 for 3 before declaration, and then dismissed Cambridge UCCE for a sorry 151 before reaching 101 for 3 by close on the second day. On the third day they sportingly declared on 154 for 3, leaving Cambridge UCCE to get 277. Despite 75 from Thomas Webley, they looked down and out at 182 for 7. But Garry Park and Tony Palladino, who also played first-class cricket for Essex in 2005, stayed in shared a 76-run partnership before Palladino was caught behind for 30. The remaining runs were then knocked off by Park, who finished on 48, and Philip Edwards, leaving the students narrow victors. (Cricinfo scorecard)

=== Middlesex v Essex (5 June) ===
Essex (4pts) beat Middlesex (0pts) by one wicket

Essex Eagles won the top of the table clash in the National League against Middlesex Crusaders at Lord's, a match which the visitors looked certain to lose many times. Middlesex' innings opened slowly, as Paul Weekes and Ed Smith paired up for 101 for the first wicket but not scoring many runs in the process. A burst of wickets followed, which reduced Middlesex to 144 for 5, but a massive cameo from Scott Styris – who scored 71 from 43 balls, including seven sixes – wrested the target up to 244. In reply, Essex scored quickly enough, but lost many wickets, being 182 for 7 with Ryan ten Doeschate and former England all-rounder Alex Tudor at the crease. Tudor went quickly, as did No. 10 Andre Adams, and Essex required 26 for the last wicket. But ten Doeschate, who had earlier been smashed for 25 in his only over, now made up for it with a stunning display of hitting as the South African recorded a career highest score of 51 not out off 41 balls, to take Essex to the target with three balls and a wicket to spare. (Cricinfo scorecard)

=== Middlesex v Surrey (8–11 June) ===
Middlesex (12pts) drew with Surrey (12pts)

Surrey edged the first day against Middlesex at Lord's. Initially Surrey reduced their hosts to 148 for 5, but then Jason Dalrymple rescued the innings with 77, supported by Irfan Pathan and Ben Scott. The first day ended with them on 319 for 7. They improved that greatly to 437 on the second day, as Pathan and Scott both made scores in the 60s. Surrey started slowly, moving to 18 for 1 after 15 overs of quality bowling from Pathan and Alan Richardson, but the stranglehold was eased with Richard Clinton scoring freely as he made his way to 73. At close, which came 18 overs early because of bad light, Surrey were 157 for 2, with Mark Ramprakash having retired hurt. Bad light claimed the last 29 overs of the third day too, but an unbeaten 152 from Ali Brown and a Surrey debut score of 81 from New South Wales recruit Dominic Thornely saw Surrey through to 460. The fourth day was always likely to meander into a draw, and exactly that happened; Surrey were simply unable to take wickets quick enough as the hosts were content to bat to 353 for 6 declared. (Cricinfo scorecard)

=== Northamptonshire v Middlesex (12 June) ===
Middlesex (4pts) beat Northamptonshire (0pts) by 2 wickets

In a close match at The County Ground, Northampton, Middlesex stole a victory thanks to intelligent running from Melvyn Betts and big scores from Jamie Dalrymple, who made a run-a-ball 76, and Irishman Ed Joyce who made 74 off 78 balls. Earlier, Australian overseas player Martin Love (111 not out) and Usman Afzaal (122 not out) had occupied the crease for Northamptonshire, sharing a 227-run partnership as the hosts made 283 for 1. In the end, however, Betts scampered the winning three on the last delivery, and stole victory from the jaws of defeat. (Cricinfo scorecard)

=== Middlesex v Glamorgan (15–18 June) ===
Middlesex (20pts) beat Glamorgan (6pts) by six wickets

Middlesex won a high-scoring match at Southgate, where only 14 wickets fell in four days, while seven centuries were hit, including a double century. After the first day was shortened by rain, Glamorgan got into their stride on the second day, Dan Cherry taking seven hours to smash 226 – while Middlesex' best bowler was Melvyn Betts, taking one for 80. Glamorgan declared on 584 for 3, and Middlesex replied in fashion, declaring on 435 for 4 in an attempt to get a result – Ed Joyce scoring 155. Three quick wickets from Alan Richardson gave Middlesex some hope of forcing Glamorgan out, but a quick 84 not out from Sourav Ganguly and Jonathan Hughes' second century of the match resulted in Glamorgan setting a tricky target of 408 in only 80–85 overs – so they thought, anyway. But tons from Ed Smith and Owais Shah lifted Middlesex to 380 for 1 (admittedly with Ben Hutton retired hurt), and Irishman Ed Joyce made 70 not out to see Middlesex to the target. (Cricinfo scorecard)

=== Middlesex v Nottinghamshire (19 June) ===
Middlesex (4pts) beat Nottinghamshire (0pts) by 31 runs

Middlesex Crusaders used their home batting paradise at Southgate to good effect, smashing Nottinghamshire Outlaws bowlers to all corners as they amassed 314 for 7 in 45 overs – Paul Weekes top-scoring with a run-a-ball 106, while Irishman Ed Joyce pushed the accelerator in the final overs with an 18-ball 41 including six boundaries. In reply, Nottinghamshire were always going to be in trouble after crashing to 86 for 4, Weekes ripping out two wickets, but Samit Patel and Chris Read lifted them to 231 for 5 before Alan Richardson removed them both. That ended the Nottinghamshire resistance, as they subsided for 283, 31 runs short with three deliveries remaining. (Cricinfo scorecard)

=== Hampshire v Middlesex (22 June) ===
Middlesex (2pts) beat Hampshire (0pts) by 18 runs

Owais Shah made a good attempt at getting the highest strike-rate of the opening day of Twenty20 cricket, recording 72 runs off only 30 balls to lift Middlesex Crusaders to an unassailable 210 for 6. For Hampshire Hawks, Shane Warne showed somewhat poor captaincy when Zimbabwean all-rounder Sean Ervine was the eighth man to come on to bowl – and then took two for 13 from two overs. New Zealander Craig McMillan, meanwhile, conceded twenty-eight runs from his only over. Despite Nic Pothas scoring 59 off 39 balls, the Hawks were nowhere near keeping up with the required pace, and Middlesex bowler Irfan Pathan was a main cause of that – he took three for 16 from four overs, as Hampshire finished on 192 for 7. (Cricinfo scorecard)

=== Surrey v Middlesex (23 June) ===
Surrey (2pts) beat Middlesex (0pts) by 23 runs

Surrey Lions recorded their second win from two matches in Twenty20 Cup cricket this season, ironic given their position at the very bottom of the 45-over National League. Ali Brown made 64 and David Thornely 67 not out as Middlesex Crusaders conceded too many runs at the fine batting track at Lord's, Surrey making 200 for 3. Owais Shah notched up his second score in the 70s in two days, taking 78 from 44 balls, and things looked good despite Shah leaving at 148 for 2. But Tim Murtagh changed all that. In four overs, he took six for 24, and with the help of David Thornely (three for 22) he ensured that Middlesex had seven batsmen out in single figures. They were bowled out for 177, with three balls remaining in the innings. (Cricinfo scorecard)

=== Kent v Middlesex (25 June) ===
Middlesex (2pts) beat Kent (0pts) by 20 runs

Ed Smith took over the mantle from Owais Shah as Middlesex Crusaders' most useful batsman in the Twenty20 Cup, as he recorded three sixes in a 59-ball 85 and lifted Middlesex to 189 for 8 against Kent Spitfires at Beckenham. In reply, Kent lost wickets regularly, and Justin Kemp – normally a quick scorer – couldn't find his footing and only made 23 not out off 19 balls, as Kent could only scamper 169 for 5 in their allotted 20 overs, 21 runs short of the target. (Cricinfo scorecard)

=== Surrey v Middlesex (28 June) ===
Surrey (2pts) beat Middlesex (0pts) by 22 runs (D/L method)

Rikki Clarke top-scored with 46 and top-bowled with three for 11 for the Surrey Lions as they moved closer to a quarter-final spot in the Twenty20 Cup with a Duckworth–Lewis method win over Middlesex Crusaders. Batting first, Surrey made 180 for 7, Tim Murtagh hitting 24 off the last eight balls as Melvyn Betts of Middlesex was smashed around. In reply, only Ed Smith could do anything serious against the Surrey bowlers, with 33 off 22 balls. When Clarke dug out him, Scott Styris and Ed Joyce in quick succession, however, things looked bright for Surrey, and then rain intervened after 11 overs of the Middlesex innings. They were never allowed to come back, and as they were 22 runs behind the par score with their 78 for 4, Surrey took the victory. (Cricinfo scorecard)

=== Middlesex v Kent (29 June) ===
Middlesex (2pts) beat Kent (0pts) by six wickets

At Uxbridge, Middlesex Crusaders proved the worth of wicket-taking bowling. Irfan Pathan dug out Matthew Walker with the second ball of the game, and that set the tone of the innings. Left-arm spinner Chris Peploe took three wickets, but conceded 35 runs, yet Kent's final total of 144 for 8 didn't look too threatening. Owais Shah kept ploughing on his hard-hitting form, taking James Tredwell to the cleaners in his 59 not out, and Middlesex made it to 145 for 4 with 16 balls remaining in the innings, as none of the opposition bowlers took more than one wicket. (Cricinfo scorecard)

=== Middlesex v Essex (1 July) ===
Middlesex (2pts) beat Essex (0pts) by 31 runs

Middlesex Crusaders defeated Essex Eagles despite missing Irish batsman Ed Joyce, who had gone off to play in the 2005 ICC Trophy. An opening partnership between Owais Shah and Ed Smith for 100 built the platform, Shah eventually making 79, and despite three wickets from Essex off-spinner James Middlebrook, Irfan Pathan smashed two sixes in his 21 to lift Middlesex to 185 for 6. Then Pathan took three quick wickets, those of Alastair Cook, Ronnie Irani and Ravinder Bopara, as Essex crashed to 45 for 5. James Foster made 62 not out to rescue Essex' honour somewhat, but the final score – 154 for 7 – was well short. Pathan got another wicket near the end to finish with four for 27. (Cricinfo scorecard)

=== Sussex v Middlesex (4 July) ===
No result; Sussex (1pt), Middlesex (1pt)

Seven overs of play was possible at The County Ground, Hove, before rain intervened. Owais Shah made 30 not out off 20 balls to see Middlesex Crusaders to a healthy 56 for 1, but Sussex Sharks never got the chance to chase as the game was abandoned. (Cricinfo scorecard)

=== Middlesex v Hampshire (6 July) ===
Hampshire (2pts) beat Middlesex (0pts) by six wickets

In a high-scoring match at Richmond, Middlesex Crusaders made 174 for 7 having opted to bat first. Owais Shah made yet another fifty – his fifth in eight innings – while Scott Styris and Paul Weekes made quick scores to up the run-rate. Shaun Udal, Sean Ervine and Craig McMillan all got two wickets. Hampshire Hawks started slowly, at about seven an over, but McMillan took a liking to Chris Peploe in particular as he smashed five sixes in his half-hour 65 not out, and thanks to McMillan's big hitting Hampshire won with sixteen balls and six wickets to spare. However, it was in vain – with only three wins, they finished fourth in the South Division tables, while Middlesex qualified despite having a poorer net run rate than Hampshire. (Cricinfo scorecard)

=== Middlesex v Hampshire (8–11 July) ===
Middlesex (19pts) beat Hampshire (7pts) by two wickets

Hampshire won the toss and chose to bat at a Southgate wicket which the final scores suggested to be not as batting-friendly as a month ago, when 13 wickets fell in the Championship match between Middlesex and Glamorgan. Three wickets from Chris Peploe set the visitors back to 189 for 7, but a 79-ball century from Shane Warne – just in time to get some Ashes form – lifted them to 355. The returning Irishman, Ed Joyce, made 54 for Middlesex, and Jamie Dalrymple made 62, but despite those innings – and 37 extras – Middlesex could only scamper 272.

Hampshire were leading by 104 overnight with one wicket down, but the third day belonged to Dalrymple. The Kenyan-born off-spinner took four for 53, including internationals John Crawley and Craig McMillan, as Hampshire imploded to 192. A Twenty20 style hit-out from Owais Shah, who made 60 off 56 balls, lifted Middlesex to 168 for 4 at stumps, and as the Hampshire captain Warne chose to bowl himself over after over despite being smashed out of the park (ending with 108 runs off nearly 30 overs for only two wickets), Middlesex reached the target shortly before lunch on day four with two wickets to spare, despite losing three wickets to Shaun Udal and two to Zimbabwean part-timer Greg Lamb. (Cricinfo scorecard)

=== Middlesex v Gloucestershire (17 July) ===
Gloucestershire (4pts) beat Middlesex (0pts) by four wickets

Middlesex Crusaders amassed 333 for 4 in 45 overs – that's nearly seven and a half runs an over, well over the average five in 45-over games – and still lost to Gloucestershire Gladiators. It didn't look as the score would be as big at first, as Paul Weekes with 81, Ed Smith with 53, Owais Shah with 55 and Scott Styris with 42 kept the score ticking at roughly a run a ball. However, Kenyan-born Jamie Dalrymple slashed four sixes and seven fours in an unbeaten 24-ball 60 to up the run rate late on, and Gloucestershire's Jon Lewis, who earlier in the summer had played ODIs for England, conceded 86 runs in nine overs. Gloucestershire always kept up with the run rate, however, as Phil Weston, Craig Spearman and Matthew Windows lifted Gloucestershire to 275 for 2, and despite Paul Weekes' late burst of four wickets, Mark Alleyne and Ian Fisher shared a stand of 18 to see Gloucestershire to the target. (Cricinfo scorecard)

=== Leicestershire v Middlesex (18 July) ===
Leicestershire beat Middlesex by 19 runs to progress to the Semi-Finals of the Twenty20 Cup

Defending champions Leicestershire Foxes reached their third successive appearances in the Twenty20 Cup semi-finals, after a fiery spell of bowling from South African Charl Willoughby helped them defend a potentially low target. Batting first, all the Leicestershire batsmen made reasonable contributions, but no one exceeded 40. With the help of 17 extras, Leicestershire finished on 159 for 6. However, Willoughby snared out three early wickets – finishing his spell of four overs with three for 11, including a rare maiden over – as Middlesex Crusaders crumbled to 16 for 3. When Jamie Dalrymple and Scott Styris threatened to win the game back with a partnership of 87, another South African, Claude Henderson rapped out two more wickets, and despite Styris being unbeaten on 73, Middlesex could only scamper 140 for 7. (Cricinfo scorecard)

=== Glamorgan v Middlesex (20 July) ===
Middlesex (4pts) beat Glamorgan (0pts) by 111 runs

After Paul Weekes had given Middlesex Crusaders a solid platform with his 72, the young batsmen showed application as Glamorgan Dragons sunk to yet another defeat. Both Ed Joyce and Ben Hutton made 61 at rates well-over a run-a-ball, as the pair added 110 for the sixth wicket, before number 11 Alan Richardson finished off with a last-ball six off Robert Croft to bring the total to 284 for 9 after Croft had grabbed three late wickets. Then, Chris Peploe took four for 38, Owais Shah held four catches despite not being the wicket-keeper, and Glamorgan rolled over for 173 in 35.4 overs. (Cricinfo scorecard)

=== Glamorgan v Middlesex (21–23 July) ===
Middlesex (22pts) beat Glamorgan (4pts) by an innings and 23 runs

The first day of the match at Sophia Gardens belonged, as expected, to Middlesex. After Ed Smith had dominated proceedings in the first hour, making 29, Ben Hutton and Owais Shah made a partnership of 109 to lift Middlesex, and their entire middle-order made contributions, as the score finished on 534 – Shah finishing on 101, Kenyan-born Jamie Dalrymple scoring 108, and number nine Peter Trego smacking 72 off 54 balls. When Glamorgan batted, Trego took three quick wickets, to end with three for 52, and Scott Styris helped mopping up the Glamorgan tail with three for 42. Only Robert Croft passed 25 – thumping 84 off 76 balls with 72 runs in boundaries – as Glamorgan subsided for 232 and were asked to follow on.

Middlesex seamer Melvyn Betts set back Glamorgan's second innings effort with two wickets to see them to 25 for 2, but opener and wicketkeeper Mark Wallace defied them with 64, and Sourav Ganguly also made 55 as Glamorgan made their way to 208 for 5, with a slight chance of making Middlesex bat again. However, Styris took the last four wickets en route to bowling figures of five for 57 as Middlesex secured the innings victory. (Cricinfo scorecard)

=== Middlesex v Warwickshire (3–6 August) ===
Warwickshire (19pts) beat Middlesex (5.5pts) by three wickets

Warwickshire had got adequate replacement for their injured Zimbabwean Heath Streak, as Makhaya Ntini took four for 79 on his debut for the Bears against Middlesex. However, Paul Weekes made 92 not out to rescue them from a poor position at 139 for 6 to a final total of 323. Then, another overseas player making his overseas debut – Stuart Clark from New South Wales, Australia – took five wickets, three on the first day and two on the second, as Warwickshire plummeted to 85 for 6. It took another 92 – from Scot Dougie Brown to see them past 200, and his four-hour knock proved invaluable to Warwickshire's eventual turn-around.

Ben Hutton and Owais Shah looked to set a massive target on day three, however, pairing up for 151 to add to Middlesex' 51-run first innings lead – but again Ntini came to the rescue for Warwickshire, as only Shah got the ball off the square and Middlesex whimpered from 281 for 3 to 330 all out. Shah finished not out, having hit 15 fours and two sixes in a five-hour 156. Peter Trego then took two wickets with two balls as Warwickshire fell to six for two, but Jamie Troughton smacked four sixes and twelve fours in a quickfire 119 as Warwickshire forced their way to 221 for 3 at stumps, with Nick Knight not out overnight on 67, leaving the match poised with 161 to win and seven wickets in hand. Knight was dismissed for 75 by the Australian Clark, who also removed Neil Carter for 15, but Alex Loudon proved too difficult to get out. His unbeaten 95, along with 27 not out from Luke Parker, saw Warwickshire pass the target with three wickets to spare, despite Middlesex' slow over rate, which caused them to be deducted half a point. (Cricinfo scorecard)

=== Essex v Middlesex (7 August) ===
Essex (4pts) beat Middlesex (0pts) by four runs

Essex Eagles extended their lead in the National League to eight points with a close win over Middlesex Crusaders and quenched nearly all hopes of a close finish for the title in that competition. Batting first, they had been worried by the opponents' captain Ben Hutton, who took three for 42, including top-scorer Ronnie Irani, as Essex faltered to 118 for 6. The Dutch international Ryan ten Doeschate ran well to make 44 off just 37 balls, as he played a major part in getting the Essex total to 202 for 8. Middlesex' top-order struggled, as only Paul Weekes passing 20 from the top seven, while Ed Smith and Ed Joyce both recorded ducks. At 102 for 6, and with skipper Hutton gone for 2, Middlesex still needed 101 runs with only four wickets in hand, but a patient 71-run partnership between Weekes and Ben Scott left Middlesex to hit 31 runs for the last three wickets. Scott hogged the strike, but couldn't get the necessary boundaries, and Middlesex finished their 45 overs on 198 for 9, five runs short of a victory that would have put them level on points with Essex. (Cricinfo scorecard)

=== Nottinghamshire v Middlesex (10–13 August) ===
Nottinghamshire (7pts) drew with Middlesex (10pts)

Andrew Harris took four expensive wickets for Nottinghamshire on the first day of the match against Middlesex at Trent Bridge. The match was left hanging in the balance overnight as Middlesex made 325, mostly thanks to 128 from Ed Smith, who made his second century of the first-class season. Ryan Sidebottom was economical, but went wicketless in his 15 overs, while Mark Ealham took two key wickets, of Smith and Owais Shah. Nottinghamshire lost no wicket in the 12 overs before stumps, making 33, but on the second day they quickly lost wickets to the medium pace of Peter Trego, which yielded career-best figures of six for 59.

Graeme Swann's 53 lifted Nottinghamshire to a somewhat respectable 181, but batting was easier than Nottinghamshire had made it look. Owais Shah and Ed Joyce added 225 for the third wicket to prove exactly that. Shah ended with an unbeaten 173, while Joyce got his third century of the season with 101, and Jamie Dalrymple also added 45 before he was lbw to Younis Khan. The wicket of Dalrymple precipitated a declaration, which set Nottinghamshire 530 to win in four sessions. Nottinghamshire, however, batted well in the evening session on the third day, making 107 for no loss, and after eight overs on day four rain set in and the two captains agreed to a draw. (Cricinfo scorecard)

=== Middlesex v Northamptonshire (15 August) ===
Northamptonshire (4pts) beat Middlesex (0pts) by 14 runs

Middlesex Crusaders waved a definite good-bye to their hopes of a National League title, losing their second game in a row and failing to take advantage of Essex Eagles' loss the preceding day. Martin Love and Rob White slashed fifties for an opening partnership of 117, and after two wickets from Chris Peploe, Bilal Shafayat entered. Taking a fancy to young medium-pacer Chris Wright, the 21-year-old slashed five sixes and seven fours to make 85 not out – only his fourth fifty in List A cricket. Middlesex' reply was led by Paul Weekes and Ed Smith – the pair started brightly, making 105 for the first wicket, but following Smith's departure only one batsman passed 20, and Middlesex failed to keep up with the required run rate to finish on 247 for 9, despite 111 from Weekes. (Cricinfo scorecard)

=== Middlesex v Sussex (16–17 August) ===
Sussex (22pts) beat Middlesex (3pts) by an innings and 232 runs

Sussex enjoyed their highest victory all season by defeating Middlesex at Lord's, after Rana Naved-ul-Hasan came in at eight to slash a first class best 139. His seventh-wicket partnership with Michael Yardy was worth 228 runs in just two and a half hours, after the first six wickets had been lost for 199 runs. With Mark Davis scoring a quickfire 50 as well, Sussex went to stumps on day one with the score 522 for 9 – with the run rate at just over five an over. Middlesex' Stuart Clark got Davis out with the fourth ball of the morning, but from then on everything went downhill. Once again, just like against Gloucestershire the previous week, Rana and Mushtaq Ahmed went berserk on the opposing batting line-ups, as Rana removed the top three batsmen and Mushtaq the next three as Middlesex crashed to 87 for 6. Then, after a brief period of calm where Ben Scott and Chris Peploe added 23 runs, Robin Martin-Jenkins broke through and Middlesex lost three wickets for three runs. Middlesex finished their first innings on 128 – Martin-Jenkins taking the last wicket to end with four for 31 – and were forced to follow on, trailing by 394 runs on first innings.

Ed Smith and Ben Hutton forged Middlesex' biggest partnership of the match so far, with 45 runs, before the wheels fell off once again. Mushtaq took three wickets in an over, and Rana Naved-ul-Hasan removed four batsmen for ducks in another frantic over, as Middlesex imploded from 45 for 0 to 48 for 7. Smith tried to force Sussex to bat again at least, batting for three hours to make 69, but Mushtaq got another three wickets to end with six for 44, and Middlesex collapsed to a total of 162. Pakistani bowlers took a total of 16 wickets for Sussex – in the last Championship game they had taken 18. (Cricinfo scorecard)

=== Kent v Middlesex (24–27 August) ===
Kent (11pts) drew with Middlesex (11pts)

Only 36 overs of play was possible on the first day at St Lawrence Ground, in which Middlesex made 92 runs for the loss of one wicket, that of Ben Hutton. The following day, Kent bowler Amjad Khan added two wickets to his overnight tally of one, as Middlesex crumbled to 136 for 4 on the second morning. However, centuries from Owais Shah and Paul Weekes swung it Middlesex' way, as they declared on 400 for 8. Kent's openers didn't wish to be any worse, with David Fulton making 110 and Rob Key 142, and Darren Stevens supplied with the fifth century of the match, making 106 before being bowled by Nantie Hayward. They declared on 549 for 6, leaving themselves roughly three hours in which to bowl Middlesex out for 149 or less, and four wickets from Min Patel gave them hope as Middlesex crashed to 77 for 6 with more than an hour to play. However, Peter Trego kept out 98 balls for a stolid, unbeaten 3, Paul Weekes got a fifty, and Middlesex saved the draw. (Cricinfo scorecard)

=== Gloucestershire v Middlesex (30 August – 2 September) ===
Gloucestershire (10pts) drew with Middlesex (9pts)

Gloucestershire recovered well from last week's defeat at the hands of Glamorgan, to give Middlesex a decent fight and take the most points from a drawn game at Bristol. The hosts batted first, and after losing Craig Spearman and Ramnaresh Sarwan early, Gloucestershire fought back with three partnerships worth more than 60. Alex Gidman, Steve Adshead and Malinga Bandara all recorded fifties; the Sri Lankan Bandara, batting at eight, took the liberty to hit two sixes in an 89-ball 70. For Middlesex, Alan Richardson and Jamie Dalrymple took four wickets each, but gave up more than four runs an over in the process as Glamorgan made 333 in 92.2 overs. Middlesex batted to stumps on day one without loss, but William Rudge removed the top three to set them back slightly. Wickets continued to fall, with Malinga Bandara taking four of them, and Middlesex crashed to 248 for 9 before a last wicket partnership between Melvyn Betts and Stuart Clark took them to 297 before Bandara dismissed Betts lbw to end with five for 71.

Betts and Clark then shared five of the ten Gloucestershire wickets to fall, interrupting Gloucestershire's innings rather regularly, but not preventing four partnerships of above 50. Kadeer Ali top-scored with 61, while Mark Hardinges was stranded on 58 to lift the hosts to a total 287, which set Middlesex 324 in five hours to win. Gloucestershire got a breakthrough in the very first over, as Ed Smith hit two fours off Jon Lewis before being caught behind after four deliveries. With Owais Shah dismissed by Bandara, Middlesex went into defensive mode, and eventually the match was declared a draw with Middlesex 121 short of the winning target. (Cricinfo scorecard)

=== Hampshire v Middlesex (5 September) ===
Middlesex (4pts) beat Hampshire (0pts) by two wickets

Two days after their win in the C&G Trophy Final, Hampshire Hawks were defeated by Middlesex Crusaders, to move closer to relegation in the National League. They were put in to bat, and lost wicket-keeper Nic Pothas for 5 early on, but John Crawley and Sean Ervine fought back with a 101-run partnership for the second wicket. The Middlesex bowlers frequently interrupted with wickets, though, and Crawley failed to hit the ball hard enough to end with only six fours in his 122-ball 92. Hampshire closed on 227 for 6, with five Middlesex bowler. Middlesex lost Paul Weekes in the first over, but a blistering 139-run stand between Owais Shah and Jamie Dalrymple turned the match around. Despite three wickets each from Hampshire's Chris Tremlett and Greg Lamb, Middlesex' Chris Peploe held his head calm, and with 14 not out he guided Middlesex to a two-wicket victory with 11 balls to spare. (Cricinfo scorecard)

=== Middlesex v Kent (7–10 September) ===
Middlesex (12pts) drew with Kent (9pts)

Former India A leg-spinner Yogesh Golwalkar took three wickets in each innings and helped Middlesex to dominance on points in his first first class game in England, though he had played two non-first class games for Essex Second XI in May. Kent had won the toss and batted first, struggling to 249 for 9 despite 94 from Darren Stevens, but Justin Kemp and Dane Amjad Khan added 135 for the last wicket before Kemp was bowled by Jamie Dalrymple for 102. Middlesex still went past Kent's total of 384, however, amassing a lead as Ben Hutton and Owais Shah made centuries, and Kent's bowling was woefully unpenetrative. Only Kemp got more than two wickets, and he got numbers eight, nine and ten in the batting order. Middlesex captain Hutton batted for more than six hours for a career-best 152, while Shah's 128 was his seventh Championship century of the season. Dalrymple and Ed Joyce added fifties as Middlesex made their way to 550 for 9 at stumps on day three. Golwalkar took three wickets on the final day, but it wasn't enough, as Kent made it to 192 for 7 to save the draw – Andrew Hall grinding out 26 in the last 51 minutes with Niall O'Brien before conditions stopped play. (Cricinfo scorecard)

=== Middlesex v Glamorgan (11 September) ===
Middlesex (4pts) beat Glamorgan (0pts) by five runs

Scott Styris redeemed some early expensive overs to come back and win the National League game for Middlesex Crusaders with his bowling. It was the Crusaders who batted first, though, against a Glamorgan Dragons side whose National League season had been their only light point after thirteen Championship defeats thus far. After Ed Smith departed for 6, fifties from Paul Weekes and Owais Shah sent Middlesex to 133 for 1. Dean Cosker took two quick wickets, but a late cameo from left-hander Ed Joyce saw Middlesex to a total of 239 for 5. Peter Trego then removed both openers, before Alex Wharf took him apart, and Trego ended with the strange bowling analysis of 4–1–31–2. Wharf was eventually caught by Smith, but David Hemp, Dan Cherry and Richard Grant forged good partnerships with Michael Powell, and Glamorgan looked good at 219 for 5. Styris had the last laugh, however, taking three wickets in the late overs as Glamorgan lost the last five men for 15 runs – bowling Glamorgan out with eight balls remaining in their quota and leaving Powell stranded on 83 not out. (Cricinfo scorecard)

=== Lancashire v Middlesex (18 September) ===
Middlesex (4pts) beat Lancashire (0pts) by 44 runs

Middlesex Crusaders' middle-order batsman Jamie Dalrymple took the Lancashire Lightning bowlers on to hit 63 from 33 balls in the late overs of the match at Old Trafford, as the Lightning were sent into the relegation zone in Division One. Middlesex batted first, with Paul Weekes and Ed Smith adding 90 for the first wicket, before Murali Kartik broke through thrice – ending with three for 43. Owais Shah and Dalrymple added 76 for the fourth wicket, however, hitting 21 boundaries on their way to half-centuries, and Middlesex posted a total of 263 for 4. Mal Loye swatted two sixes and a four before being caught by Dalrymple for 19, who took four catches in the Lancashire innings – including one off his own bowling. The Lightning fell to 94 for 5, with four Middlesex bowlers getting one wicket each, and despite all-rounder Glen Chapple recording his first one-day half-century of the season with 71, and they were bowled out for 219 an over before the end. (Cricinfo scorecard)

=== Surrey v Middlesex (21–24 September) ===
Surrey (20pts) beat Middlesex (6pts) by an innings and 39 runs

Middlesex won the toss and batted first at The Oval in this relegation clash, where Surrey needed to win by 15 points to avoid relegation. After half-centuries from Owais Shah, Ben Hutton and Ed Joyce, however, Middlesex were 200 for 4, and Joyce put on a fifth-wicket partnership of 174 with Scott Styris. Styris hit thirteen fours and a six in his 100 not out, his first century in nine matches for Middlesex in 2005, and once Styris had hit his century Hutton declared the Middlesex innings closed on 404 for 5 – ensuring that Middlesex got all five batting points and Surrey only got one bowling point. Surrey thus needed to score 400 runs in 130 overs for only two wickets if they were to survive in Division One. However, six minutes into the innings, captain Mark Butcher was run out for 5, and Rikki Clarke went shortly afterwards. Surrey closed on 59 for 2, needing 341 without further loss to avoid the drop. Middlesex got the wicket they needed on the second morning, with Yogesh Golwalkar dismissing Scott Newman lbw for 51, leaving Surrey to relegation. Despite that, they accumulated runs to end the second day on 462 for 4, although 33 overs were bowled by Shah, Hutton and Joyce. Mark Ramprakash reached 200 not out by the close, his tenth first class double century.

Surrey passed 600 on the third day, before Shah picked up his second wicket of the match, removing Ramprakash for 252 – ending an all-time record fifth-wicket partnership of 318. Azhar Mahmood, who had shared the stand with Ramprakash, went on to make 204 not out before Surrey declared on 686 for 7 – before leg-spinners Saqlain Mushtaq and Ian Salisbury shared six wickets between them to bowl Middlesex out for 243 and to record an innings victory – to no avail, as Midldesex finished one point ahead in the final table. (Cricinfo scorecard)
