= Stanford Super Series =

- Countries: Antigua and Barbuda
- Format: Twenty20
- Tournament format: One off match with warm ups
- Number of teams: 4

The Stanford Super Series was a series of Twenty20 cricket matches in 2008, sponsored by Allen Stanford. The main game of the Series matched the English national cricket team against an all-star team from the Caribbean, called the Stanford Superstars.

The prize money awarded in the tournament was winner-take-all; the players for the winning team in the yearly game took home $20 million prize money, and the losing players did not earn anything. The domestic West Indies and England Twenty20 champions competed for the Champions Cup, as well as playing in a series of other exhibition matches with the Superstars and England. The tournament collapsed following the arrest (and subsequent conviction) of Allen Stanford for an $8 billion fraud, part of which funded the prize money for the Super Series.

The tournament was played between 25 October – 1 November consisting of 5 warm-up matches and a grand finale. This final match was played between the Stanford Superstars and England. Before it began, the tournament was threatened with cancellation due to a row between Digicel, the West Indies Cricket Board's (WICB) main sponsor, and Stanford. Digicel argued that it should get sponsorship rights because it is WICB's sponsorship rights holder and that the tournament was officially sanctioned by the WICB. All 2008 Super Series matches took place at the Stanford Cricket Ground in Antigua, and started at 5:30 pm local time (9:30 pm in the United Kingdom). All games were aired on Sky Sports in the UK.

== History ==
Allen Stanford proposed emphasizing Twenty20 cricket as a way to promote cricket in the West Indies. He created the Stanford 20/20, a yearly tournament featuring teams from the island nations that made up the West Indies. From the first edition of his tournament in 2006, he aimed to have the best players from his tournament play as a team against an international team. Initially, South Africa had been planned to play against the Stanford team for a prize of US$5 million, but that effort fell through after scheduling conflicts with the WICB.

In 2008, Stanford looked to expand the tournament and decided once again to feature a high-stakes game featuring the best players in the West Indies versus an international team. Stanford initially wished to invite Sri Lanka, India, Australia and South Africa to come and play a single-elimination tournament in Antigua, with the winner facing his all-star team. However, due to contractual issues with the ICC and ESPN-Star and scheduling constraints that tournament was infeasible. Instead, Stanford invited the winners of the World Twenty20, India, to play for a prize of US$5 million (later US$10 million) and planned to ask Australia to come as a back-up should India decline or be unavailable. India, who were in the process of launching the highly successful first year of their domestic Twenty20 league, the Indian Premier League, declined as they did not want to be involved in a privately funded programme.

When that deal fell through, Stanford increased the prize money to US$20 million and aimed to get either England or Australia involved. After meeting with the ECB from April through June, Stanford finally signed a five-year deal with the England and Wales Cricket Board to host a series of US$20 million, winner-take-all matches, worth $100 million in total. In addition, the deal included an annual Twenty20 quadrangular involving England (as hosts), West Indies and two invitational teams with a prize of US$9.5 million.

== Prize money ==
The final $20 million prize was split as follows: each of the 11 players on the winning team who played in the championship game would take home $1 million. Another $1 million would be split amongst the players who were selected for the winning team, but did not play in the championship game; $1 million would go to the management team and the remaining $7 million would be split between the English Cricket Board and the West Indies Cricket Board.

== Summary ==
The tournament was seen to have been commenced successfully, though pitch conditions meant that its opening matches were low-scoring. Criticism was also levelled at the floodlights in the Antigua pitch, which were low enough to obstruct the vision of fielding players, with Middlesex captain Shaun Udal stating "I have not known a ground where the visibility is as bad". The behaviour of organiser Allen Stanford was also questioned, particularly after he offended a number of England players by acting flirtatiously with their wives during a match, actions for which he later apologised The England team was later hit by a stomach bug, leading Kevin Pietersen to declare that he was looking forward to the tournament's completion. Before the tournament ended, the England and Wales Cricket Board (ECB) announced that they would be reviewing the five-year contract that they had signed with Stanford, bringing into question their participation in future tournaments

However, the Trinidad and Tobago v England game was described as 'thrilling'. The tournament received a large amount of media coverage whilst it was extremely popular with fans in the West Indies. Commentators were generally positive about the success of the tournament within its host venue, with Jonathan Agnew claiming that it was organised significantly better than the previous World Cup, also held in the West Indies.

== Competitors ==
The Stanford Superstars and an England XI were scheduled to compete in the first five tournaments. Alongside them were the champions of the Stanford 20/20 in the West Indies and the champions of the Twenty20 Cup in England. These were Trinidad and Tobago and Middlesex Crusaders. The two domestic champions competed for the Champions Cup whilst Stanford Superstars and England contested the Final, labelled the 20/20 For 20 match.

=== Qualification ===
The Stanford Superstars was a squad selected from the best players in the Stanford 20/20 competition. England competed in the first year of a five-year contract to be involved in the tournament. Trinidad and Tobago qualified as the winners of the Stanford 20/20 whilst Middlesex Crusaders qualified as winners of the Twenty20 Cup in England and Wales.

=== 2008 Stanford SuperStars ===
On 14 August 2008, the All-Stars selection panel, which was led by cricketing legend Sir Viv Richards, and which included fellow West Indies cricketing luminaries as Sir Everton Weekes, Curtly Ambrose, Lance Gibbs, Richie Richardson, Andy Roberts and Courtney Walsh, announced 17 players who would play under the Stanford SuperStars colours in the Super Series.

(Jamaica) Chris Gayle (c)
(Jamaica) Daren Powell
(Jamaica) Jerome Taylor
(Antigua and Barbuda) Sylvester Joseph (Vice-captain)
(Antigua and Barbuda) Chad Hampson
(Trinidad and Tobago) Dave Mohammed
(Trinidad and Tobago) Kieron Pollard
(Trinidad and Tobago) Rayad Emrit
(Guyana) Ramnaresh Sarwan
(Guyana) Shivnarine Chanderpaul
(Guyana) Lennox Cush
(Grenada) Andre Fletcher
(Barbados) Sulieman Benn
(Montserrat) Lionel Baker
(Saint Vincent and the Grenadines) Lindon James

Support Staff:
(Antigua and Barbuda) Coach, Head: Eldine Baptiste
(Guyana) Coach, Asst: Roger Harper
(England) Coach, Fielding: Julien Fountain
(Saint Vincent and the Grenadines) Coach, Manager: Cardigan Connor
(Guyana) Analyst: Robin Singh
(Cuba) Trainer: Hector Martinez
(England) Physiotherapist: Kim Jackson
(Cuba) Physiotherapist Julio Gonsalves
(Saint Kitts and Nevis) Physical Therapist: Virgil Browne

(Dwayne Bravo (Trinidad and Tobago) (injury), and Xavier Marshall (Jamaica) (failed drug test) were named to the initial team under the initial selection procedures, but withdrew before the Series was played. Darren Sammy (Saint Lucia) and Travis Dowlin (Guyana) were named to replace them in the squad.)

=== 2008 English squad ===
On 9 September 2008, three weeks after the Superstars squad was named, the England Cricket Board announced their 15-man squad for the 2008 Super Series.

Kevin Pietersen, Hampshire, (captain)
James Anderson, Lancashire
Ian Bell, Warwickshire
Ravi Bopara, Essex
Stuart Broad, Nottinghamshire
Paul Collingwood, Durham
Alastair Cook, Essex
Andrew Flintoff, Lancashire
Stephen Harmison, Durham
Samit Patel, Nottinghamshire
Matt Prior, Sussex
Owais Shah, Middlesex
Graeme Swann, Nottinghamshire
Ryan Sidebottom, Nottinghamshire
Luke Wright, Sussex

=== 2008 Trinidad and Tobago squad ===
Rishi Bachan
Samuel Badree
Darren Bravo
Kevon Cooper
Daron Cruickshank
Daren Ganga (captain)
Sherwin Ganga
Justin Guillen
Amit Jaggernauth
Richard Kelly
William Perkins
Denesh Ramdin
Ravi Rampaul
Lendl Simmons
Navin Stewart

=== 2008 Middlesex squad ===
Neil Carter
Neil Dexter
Steven Finn
Billy Godleman
Tyron Henderson
Ed Joyce
Murali Kartik
Dawid Malan
Eoin Morgan
Tim Murtagh
David Nash
Alan Richardson
Ben Scott
Andrew Strauss
Shaun Udal (captain)

== Reception ==
The matches were well attended, but the press (especially the British contingent) was mainly very sceptical. "Of all the short-form matches currently being organised," wrote Stephen Brenkley in The Independent on 26 October 2008, "the conclusion is easily reached that Stanford Superstars v England is the most offensive. It has no context as a proper sporting competition, it is neither country versus country, club versus club or invitation XI versus invitation XI. It is a rococo hybrid. It has money, but nothing else going for it." It has since been alleged that Stanford's creation of the tournament was primarily a method to launder his income from the fraudulent business schemes for which he is now serving a penal sentence in the US.

== Commercial dispute ==
Digicel, who sponsored the West Indies Cricket Board, filed suit to halt the Stanford Super Series. They claimed that due to their deal with the West Indies Cricket Board, that they were due certain advertising and broadcasting rights that were not being granted to them. The response from the West Indies Board, and from the representatives of the Super Series was that the Stanford Superstars were an unofficial team, and thus the Digicel agreement did not come into play. Digicel won the suit, in front of the High Court in London, England. However, they later reached a deal with Stanford Super Series officials, that allowed the tournament to continue for at least three years.

== Dissolution ==
Following the first year of the series, the future of the competition was put in doubt after Stanford disbanded his team of 12 'Stanford Legends' who had been acting as ambassadors for the tournament. In the wake of fraud charges made against Stanford, the ECB terminated all contracts with Stanford in February 2009, meaning that the England cricket team took no further part in Stanford organised matches. Stanford was later convicted of 13 of 14 charges laid against him by U.S. authorities and was sentenced to 110 years in prison, which he is currently serving in United States Penitentiary, Coleman in Coleman, Florida.

== Matches ==
=== Exhibition Matches ===
25 October 2008
scorecard

Stanford Superstars; 146/5 (20 overs)	v	Trinidad & Tobago; 124/8 (20 overs)
Sylvester Joseph 45*; Samuel Badree 2/20		Justin Guillen 31; Sulieman Benn 2/15

Superstars won by 22 runs
Stanford Cricket Ground, Coolidge, Antigua
Umpires: Steve Davis and Simon Taufel

26 October 2008
scorecard

England; 121/4 (20 overs)	v	Middlesex; 109/4 (20 overs)
Owais Shah 39*; Murali Kartik 2/27		Dawid Malan 42*; Ryan Sidebottom 1/5; Stuart Broad 1/13

England won by 12 runs
Stanford Cricket Ground, Coolidge, Antigua
Umpires: Asad Rauf and Rudi Koertzen

28 October 2008
scorecard

England; 141/6 (20 overs)	v	Trinidad and Tobago; 140/9 (20 overs)
Kevin Pietersen 44; Sherwin Ganga 4/23		Denesh Ramdin 37; Andrew Flintoff 3/30

England won by 1 run
Stanford Cricket Ground, Coolidge, Antigua
Umpires: Asad Rauf and Simon Taufel

30 October 2008
scorecard

Stanford Superstars; 173/4 (20 overs)	v	Middlesex; 115 (17.3 overs)
Andre Fletcher 90; Shaun Udal 1/24		Eoin Morgan; Dave Mohammed 2/10; Darren Sammy 2/14

Superstars win by 58 runs
Stanford Cricket Ground, Coolidge, Antigua
Umpires: Asad Rauf and SJ Davis

=== Trans-Atlantic Twenty20 Champions Cup ===
27 October 2008
scorecard

Trinidad and Tobago; 122/5 (19.2 overs)	v	Middlesex; 117/8 (20 overs)
Denesh Ramdin 41; Dawid Malan 2/11; Tim Murtagh 2/18		Neil Dexter 39; Ravi Rampaul 4/25

Trinidad and Tobago won by 5 wickets
Stanford Cricket Ground, Coolidge, Antigua
Umpires: Steve Davis and Rudi Koertzen
Player of the match: Ravi Rampaul

=== $20 million match ===
1 November 2008
scorecard

England; 99 (19.5 overs)	v	Stanford Superstars; 101/0 (12.4 overs)
Samit Patel 22; Sulieman Benn 3/16		Chris Gayle 65*; Andre Fletcher 32*

Stanford Superstars won by 10 wickets
Stanford Cricket Ground, Coolidge, Antigua
Umpires: Rudi Koertzen and Simon Taufel
Player of the match: Darren Sammy

== Results ==
=== Trans-Atlantic Twenty20 Champions Cup ===
Date	Host Nation	Venue	Winner	Result	Runner-up
27 October 2008	Antigua and Barbuda	(Antigua and Barbuda) Stanford Cricket Ground, St. John's	Trinidad and Tobago	5 wickets	Middlesex Crusaders

=== Final ===
Date	Host Nation	Venue	Winner	Result	Runner-up
1 November 2008	Antigua and Barbuda	(Antigua and Barbuda) Stanford Cricket Ground, St. John's	Stanford Superstars	10 wickets	England

== See also ==
- Stanford 20/20
