= Nigel Ross =

Nigel Ross may refer to:

- Nigel Ross (cricketer, born 1953), English cricketer
- Nigel Ross (cricketer, born 1882) (1882–1933), English cricketer

== See also ==
- Nigel Ross-Scott, musician in Re-Flex
