= Herkes =

Herkes may refer to:

- Bob Herkes (born 1957), former English cricketer
- Herkes Kendi Evinde a 2001 Turkish drama film
- James Neville Burnett-Herkes (1912-1979), Bermudian politician
