= Scollay =

Scollay is a surname. Notable people with the surname include:

- Fred J. Scollay (1923–2015), American actor
- Gabrielle Scollay (born 1989), Australian actress
- Leonard Scollay (1973–2014), Shetland fiddle player
- Mercy Scollay, fiancée of American physician and patriot Joseph Warren
- Tom Scollay (born 1987), Australian cricketer
- William Scollay (1756–1809), American developer and militia officer
