= Stephen Poulter =

Stephen Poulter may refer to:

- Stephen Poulter (cricketer) (born 1956), English cricketer
- Stephen Poulter (swimmer) (born 1961), British swimmer
