= Christopher Hirst =

English cricketer and educator

Personal information
- Full name: Christopher Halliwell Hirst
- Born: 27 May 1947 (age 79); Odsal, Bradford, Yorkshire, England
- Batting: Right-handed
- Bowling: Right-arm off break

Domestic team information
- Years: Team
- 1967–1968: Buckinghamshire
- 1967: Cambridge University

Career statistics
Competition	First-class
Matches	1
Runs scored	8
Batting average	8.00
100s/50s	0/0
Top score	6*
Catches/stumpings	0/–
- Source: Cricinfo, 26 May 2011

Christopher Halliwell Hirst (born 27 May 1947) is a former English cricketer and educator. Hirst was a right-handed batsman who bowled right-arm off break. He was born in Odsal, Bradford, Yorkshire.

Hirst attended Trinity Hall, Cambridge. While attending Trinity Hall, Hirst made his only first-class appearance for Cambridge University against Middlesex. In the university first-innings, he scored 2 runs before being dismissed by David Ling. In their second-innings, he remained unbeaten on 6 at the close of the match, which ended in a draw. 1967 also saw his debut for Buckinghamshire in the Minor Counties Championship against Hertfordshire. He played Minor counties cricket for Buckinghamshire from 1967 to 1968, which included 14 matches.

Outside of cricket, Hirst trained as an executive for the Bank of London and South America, with his work taking him to Chile. He later embarked on a teaching career. He was an assistant master at Radley College from 1972 to 1985, serving as a housemaster from 1978 to 1985. He then became headmaster at Kelly College in Devon, a position he held from 1985 to 1995. From 1995 to 2010, he was the headmaster of Sedbergh School in Cumbria.
