= Colin Cook =

Colin Cook may refer to:

- Colin Cook (cricketer) (born 1960), English cricketer
- Colin Cook (footballer) (1909–?), English footballer
- Colin Cook (speedway rider) (born 1954), English speedway rider
