= Ian Hutchinson =

Ian Hutchinson may refer to:

- Ian Hutchinson (cricketer) (born 1964), Welsh cricketer
- Ian Hutchinson (footballer, born 1948) (1948–2002), English football player with Chelsea
- Ian Hutchinson (footballer, born 1972), English football player and manager
- Ian Hutchinson (motorcyclist) (born 1979), English motorcycle road racer
- Ian Hutchinson (scientist), American physicist
