= Scott Moffat =

South African-born English cricketer

Personal information
- Full name: Scott Park Moffat
- Born: 1 February 1973 (age 53); Germiston, Transvaal Province, South Africa
- Batting: Right-handed
- Bowling: Right-arm off break

Domestic team information
- Years: Team
- 1996–1997: Middlesex
- 1993–1996: Hertfordshire

Career statistics
Competition	First-class	List A
Matches	5	8
Runs scored	122	139
Batting average	20.33	19.85
100s/50s	–/–	–/1
Top score	47	60
Balls bowled	–	–
Wickets	–	–
Bowling average	–	–
5 wickets in innings	–	–
10 wickets in match	–	–
Best bowling	–	–
Catches/stumpings	2/–	2/–
- Source: Cricinfo, 16 March 2012

Scott Park Moffat (born 1 February 1973) is a South African-born former English cricketer. Moffat was a right-handed batsman who bowled right-arm off break. He was born at Germiston, Transvaal Province.

Moffat first appeared in county cricket for Hertfordshire, making his debut for the county in the 1993 Minor Counties Championship against Norfolk. He made nine further appearances for Hertfordshire in that competition, the last of which came against Bedfordshire in 1995. He also made a single MCCA Knockout Trophy appearance for the county in the 1996 MCCA Knockout Trophy against Wiltshire, it was in that same season that he made his first-class debut for Middlesex against Oxford University. He made four further first-class appearances for the county, the last of which came against Leicestershire in the 1997 County Championship. With the bat, he scored a total of 122, which came at an average of 20.33, with a high score of 47.

Moffat also played List A cricket for Middlesex, with his debut in that format coming against Essex in the 1997 Benson & Hedges Cup. He made seven further List A appearances for the county, the last of which came against Lancashire in the 1997 AXA Life League. In his eight List A appearances, he scored 139 runs at an average of 19.85, with a high score of 60. This score was his only half century in one-day cricket and came against Somerset in the Benson & Hedges Cup. Frustrated by a lack of opportunities, he left Middlesex at the end of the 1997 season.
