= Andrew Needham =

English cricketer (born 1957)

Personal information
- Full name: Andrew Needham
- Born: 23 March 1957 (age 69); Calow, Derbyshire, England
- Nickname: Needers
- Height: 5 ft 10 in (1.78 m)
- Batting: Right-handed
- Bowling: Right arm off break

Domestic team information
- Years: Team
- 1989–1991: Hertfordshire
- 1987–1988: Middlesex
- 1977–1986: Surrey

Career statistics
Competition	First-class	List A
Matches	109	90
Runs scored	3,077	1,082
Batting average	23.13	18.03
100s/50s	4/12	0/3
Top score	138	55
Balls bowled	10,753	2,257
Wickets	124	50
Bowling average	43.33	30.90
5 wickets in innings	6	0
10 wickets in match	0	n/a
Best bowling	6/30	4/32
Catches/stumpings	50/–	22/–
- Source: Cricinfo, 10 December 2008

Andrew ("Andy") Needham (born 23 March 1957, Calow, Derbyshire) is a former first-class cricketer, who represented Surrey and Middlesex, before representing Hertfordshire in the Minor Counties Championship.

== First-class cricket career ==
Needham was a right-arm off-spinner, with a batting record that suggested he could be considered an all-rounder. He was 25 before finally becoming a Surrey first team regular in 1982. He made an immediate impact with the bat, scoring his maiden first-class hundred in just his third match of that summer, with 134 not out, from number nine in the batting order, adding 172 for the tenth wicket with Robin Jackman. He then went on to take 5–91 in the same match.

Needham scored three hundreds and passed 1000 runs for the only time in 1985, but at the end of the 1986 season "surprised many by moving north to join Middlesex. He stayed two seasons, becoming more of a utility player in one-dayers".

== Minor counties and other ==
Needham went on to become a cricket coach at Watford Grammar School for Boys, where he had been a pupil. but he also became a significant player for Hertfordshire in the Minor Counties Championship from 1989 to 1994.

== See also ==
- List of Middlesex County Cricket Club List A cricketers#N
