= Iain O'Brien =

New Zealand cricketer

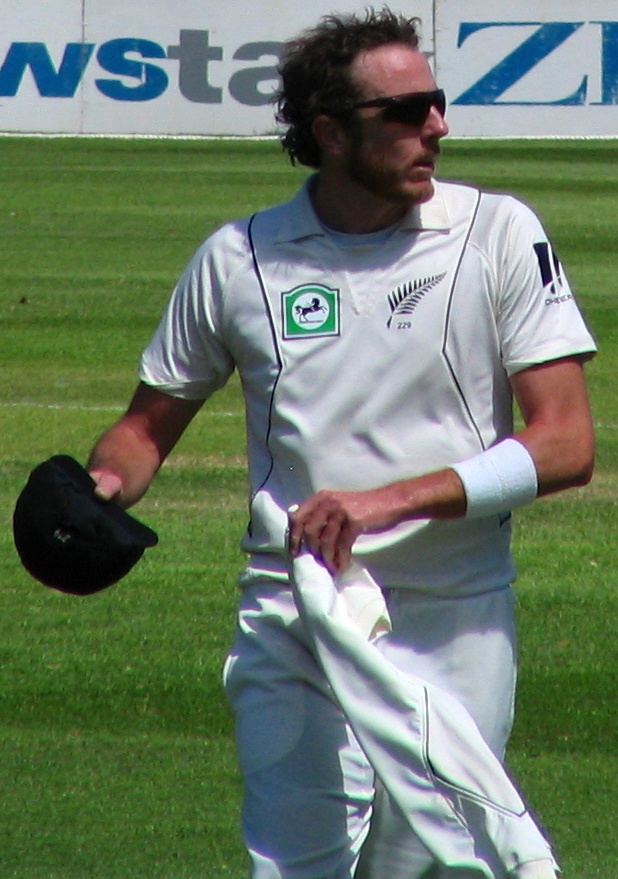
- Iain O'Brien at the University Oval, Dunedin, New Zealand

Personal information
- Full name: Iain Edward O'Brien
- Born: 10 July 1976 (age 50); Lower Hutt, New Zealand
- Batting: Right-handed
- Bowling: Right-arm fast medium

International information
- National side: New Zealand (2005–2009)
- Test debut (cap 229): 10 March 2005 v Australia
- Last Test: 11 December 2009 v Pakistan
- ODI debut (cap 147): 20 February 2008 v England
- Last ODI: 14 March 2009 v India
- T20I debut (cap 38): 15 February 2009 v Australia
- Last T20I: 6 June 2009 v Scotland

Domestic team information
- Years: Team
- 2000/01–2009/10: Wellington
- 2009: Leicestershire
- 2010: Middlesex

Career statistics
Competition	Test	ODI	FC	LA
Matches	22	10	91	58
Runs scored	219	3	756	99
Batting average	7.55	–	8.68	24.75
100s/50s	0/0	0/0	0/0	0/0
Top score	31	3*	44	19*
Balls bowled	4,394	453	16,845	2,842
Wickets	73	14	322	75
Bowling average	33.27	34.85	26.06	31.41
5 wickets in innings	1	0	14	2
10 wickets in match	0	0	1	0
Best bowling	6/75	3/68	8/55	5/35
Catches/stumpings	7/–	1/–	17/–	9/–
- Source: ESPNcricinfo, 31 January 2012

Iain Edward O'Brien (born 10 July 1976) is a former New Zealand cricketer, who played 22 Tests, 10 ODIs and 4 T20Is. A pace bowler, he took 73 test wickets with best figures of 6 for 75 against West Indies in 2008. He played first class cricket for Wellington, Leicestershire County Cricket Club and Middlesex County Cricket Club.

He retired from all cricket in January 2012 due to chronic injury problems.

== International career ==
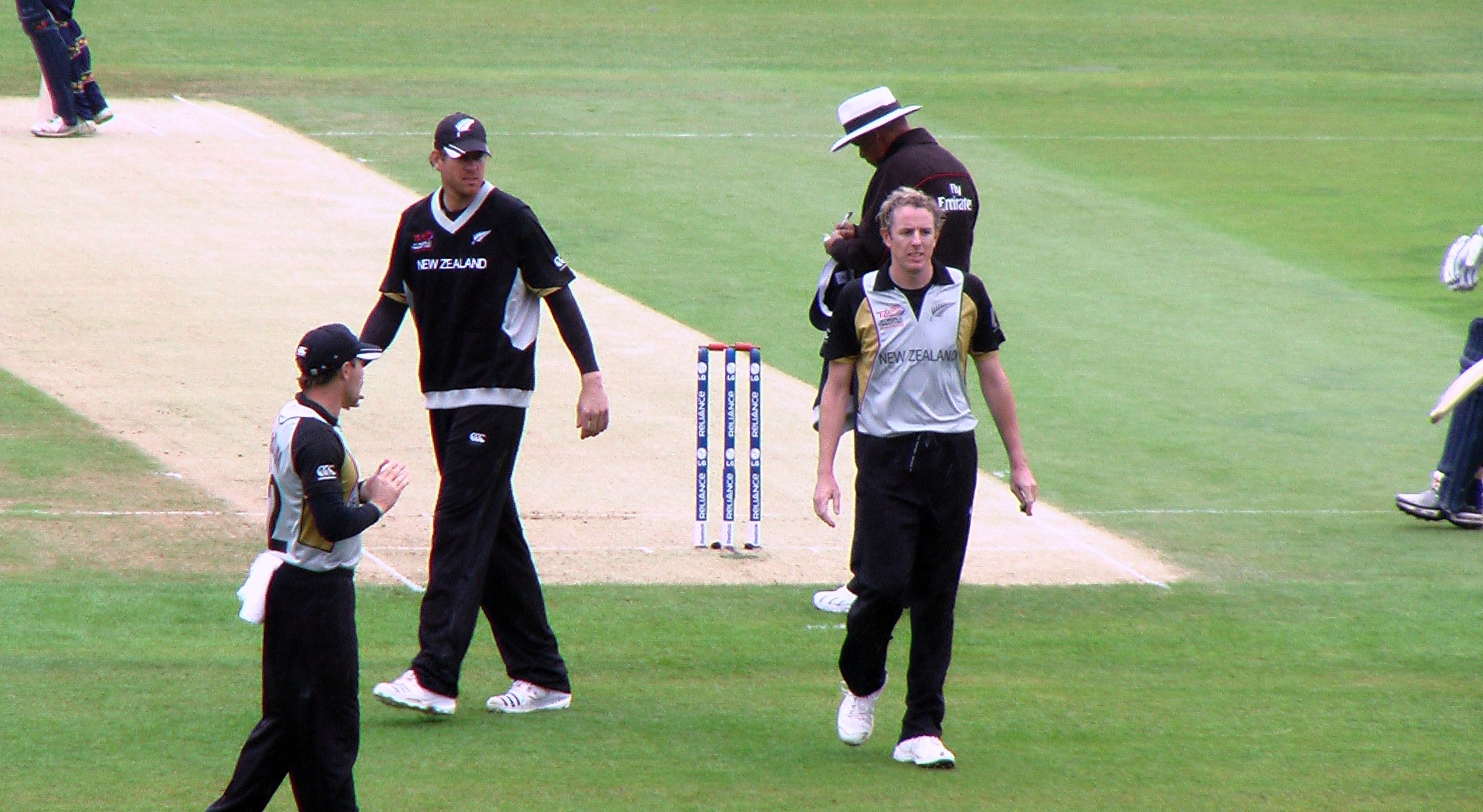
O'Brien prepares to bowl against Scotland in the 2009 ICC World Twenty20.

O'Brien made his debut for the national side in March 2005 following injuries to senior international players, such as Shane Bond, Daryl Tuffey and Chris Martin but has been in and out of the side since to replace injured and retired players. He made his One Day International debut against the England cricket team, and had a tough debut, with figures of 1/59 in 6 overs.

However, between 2007 and 2009 he established himself in the Test side, and to a lesser extent, in the ODI side, particularly in the absence of Shane Bond. He was renowned as an 'into-the-wind' bowler who would often bowl at an end that did not offer favourable bowling conditions, especially at the Basin Reserve in Wellington, a ground renowned for strong winds. He enjoyed much success as a fast bowler for the Black Caps, with great performances against England in the UK, and against the West Indies cricket team at home, where he took his best Test figures of 6/75, in a spell of bowling regarded as one of the best in New Zealand. These performance have given him the reputation as a wicket-taking bowler, and being the go-to man for Daniel Vettori, the captain. He continued his consistent spells against the Australia cricket team, home and away, and for Wellington.

During New Zealand's tour of England in 2008, he had had similar success, taking 15 wickets at 26.80. Against the Pakistan cricket team at home in December 2009, he has become well known for bowling New Zealand to victory by taking 3 wickets while suffering from a broken thumb. In this same series, he took 6 wickets in the next game, including 4/66, dismissing the likes of Salman Butt, Imran Farhat and Misbah-ul-Haq.

In December 2009, he announced his decision to retire from international cricket to spend more time with his wife in England and this decision prompted Middlesex to sign O'Brien as their overseas player for the 2010 season.

== Domestic career ==
He played at Leicestershire during the 2009 season as their overseas player, impressing by taking 21 first-class wickets at an average of 26.04 in a struggling team, including 9 wickets in a game where he took 6/39 on his birthday.

The 2010 season was a frustrating one for O'Brien, he took 23 wickets at an average of 27.30 for Middlesex in division two of the County championship. However, injury restricted his appearances for Middlesex to just seven championship matches, one CB40 match (in which he took 4–41 in 8 overs) & a single FP Twenty20 match.

== Writing ==
Part of O'Brien's appeal to fans is because of his writing, both for his own blog and for cricinfo. O'Brien has been direct about his own performance during his career. His blog is not updated immediately after all games, but he generally describes the matches he has played in. It is different from the professionally written columns of most cricketers, and has resulted in disagreements with NZC previously. O'Brien writes and has already been a guest writer in the book Ashes 09: When Freddie Became Jesus and is contributing to a book on New Zealand Indoor Cricket as well.

O'Brien also is an occasional contributor to Test Match Sofa – an online alternative cricket commentary service as well as BBC and Sky cricket commentary teams.

== See also ==
- List of Middlesex County Cricket Club List A cricketers#O
