= Julien Fountain =

English professional cricket coach

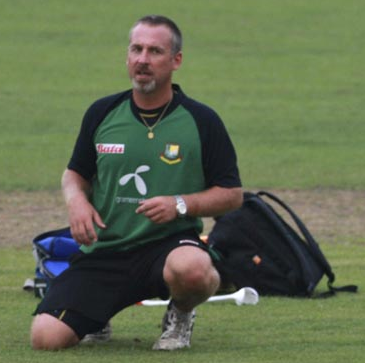

Personal information
- Full name: Julien Fountain
- Born: 25 July 1970 (age 56); Shoreham-by-Sea, Sussex, England
- Nickname: Jules, The Professor, The Baseball Guy
- Height: 5 ft 10 in (1.78 m)
- Batting: Right-handed
- Bowling: Right-arm off break
- Role: Coach
- Source: Cricinfo

Julien Fountain (born 25 July 1970) is an English professional cricket coach and former Great Britain baseball player. He specialises in Fielding Coaching and has worked with the several national cricket teams, including those of the West Indies, Pakistan, Bangladesh, and England. Fountain was also part of the coaching staff of the Dhaka Gladiators during their league-winning campaign in the Bangladesh Premier League in 2012.

Fountain is recognised as the first baseball player to be hired as a specialist fielding coach by a test-level cricket team when he joined the West Indies cricket team in 1998. He also became the first baseball coach to serve as the head coach of an ICC full-member team when he was appointed as temporary head coach of Bangladesh in 2010.

== Baseball playing career ==
In July 1988, Fountain, a pitcher, was selected to represent the Great Britain U19 baseball team at the European Championships in Bordeaux, France. The following year, he made his debut for the Great Britain national baseball team. He also represented Great Britain in the European Baseball Championship in 1989 and in 1991. In 1989, Fountain played against the Major League Players Alumni Legends team at Old Trafford Cricket Ground. In 2002, he also recalled to the Great Britain team during a qualification tournament in Stockholm, Sweden.

== Cricket coaching career ==
=== England Youth ===
In 1996, Fountain was approached by the British Baseball Federation to assist with a cricket course organised by the National Cricket Association. This course was led by Gordon Lord, who later involved Fountain in coaching England's youth teams. Fountain then became the fielding specialist coach for all the England youth teams, working with notable players such as Andrew Flintoff, Chris Read, Ben Hollioake, Graeme Swann, Michael Carberry, and Owais Shah. He also coached the England women's cricket team.

=== West Indies and Trinidad ===
In 1998 Fountain was appointed by the West Indies Cricket Board (WICB) to coach the West Indies 'A' Team in Antigua. He was later asked to accompany the full West Indies cricket team on their tour of South Africa and the WICB Advanced Course in Trinidad and Tobago. Fountain was retained as part of the backroom staff under head coach Malcolm Marshall and later rejoined the senior team in Jamaica and Barbados.

Fountain accompanied the West Indies team to the United Kingdom for the Cricket World Cup. In 2000, he was appointed head coach of Queens Park Cricket Club in Trinidad. During his time in Trinidad, Fountain was approached to rejoin the West Indies for their 2000-2001 tour of Australia. Fountain took the field twice as a substitute fielder during the tour. Afterward, his role with the West Indies team diminished, with allegations of mistreatment by the WICB.

=== Pakistan ===
Fountain was approached by the Pakistan Cricket Board to act as assistant and specialist coach for the Pakistan A cricket team on their tour of Sri Lanka under head coach Mudassar Nazar. In 2006, Fountain was hired by Bob Woolmer as a specialist fielding coach for the Pakistan national cricket team on their tour of England.

=== West Indies and return to England ===
In 2007, the West Indies cricket team were touring England when head coach David Moore requested Fountain's assistance for the remainder of the NPower Test Series and the ODI / T20 series.

=== Stanford Professional Franchise Teams ===
In 2008, Fountain was hired by Stanford T20 Cricket, as the fielding coach for the newly formed Stanford Superstars team. The Stanford Superstars were to play in the Stanford Super Series of cricket between Middlesex County Cricket Club from England, along with Trinidad and Tobago national cricket team, England, and the Superstars in a round-robin series of games, culminating in a game against England for $20 million. The Superstars won the series, receiving the $20 million prize, the largest winners pay cheque ever offered in cricket.

=== Return to Bangladesh ===
Fountain helped as a fielding coach for Bangladesh against New Zealand. This is the first time Bangladesh had a series win over a full-strength Test-playing nation. As well as handling the fielding, he took a small hand in both batting & bowling coaching whilst working with Bangladesh. During the 2010 series against Zimbabwe, Fountain was temporarily appointed as head coach, whilst Jamie Siddons attended the birth of his second child in Australia. He was also on the coaching staff for the Bangladesh national cricket team during the 2011 Cricket World Cup where Bangladesh were knocked out at the group stage.

Having both had experience in baseball, Fountain and Ian Pont, while coaching Bangladesh, combined to use their cricket and baseball backgrounds to design a completely new slower ball for pace bowlers or variation ball for spin bowlers.

In 2012, Fountain was hired as specialist fielding coach by the Dhaka Gladiators in the Bangladesh Premier League with Dhaka winning the tournament.

In March 2012, Fountain was appointed as fielding coach for Pakistan.

==== South Korea ====
In 2014, Fountain was hired as head coach of South Korea for the 2014 Asian Games in Incheon, South Korea. South Korea played three games during the tournament and reached the quarter-finals, where they were beaten by Sri Lanka.

== Other Work ==
=== Other National Teams ===
==== Ireland ====
In 2009, Fountain was appointed as specialist fielding coach to the Irish cricket team under former West Indies cricketer, Phil Simmons, during their World Cup Qualifying Tournament in South Africa. Ireland won the tournament, retained their ODI status and qualified for the 2011 Cricket World Cup. Fountain also assisted Ireland during their matches against Scotland and England.

== After Coaching ==
In January 2015, Fountain launched a project in the USA designed to help former professional baseball players make the transition to playing T20 Cricket.

In February 2015, Fountain was invited to join the Honorary Advisory Board of the American Cricket Federation.
