= Chad Hampson =

Antiguan cricketer (born 1988)

Personal information
- Full name: Chad Beau Hampson
- Born: 31 March 1988 (age 38); New Winthropes, Antigua
- Batting: Right-handed
- Bowling: Right-arm medium
- Role: Bowler

Domestic team information
- Years: Team
- 2008: Leeward Islands
- 2008: Stanford Superstars
- 2008: Antigua and Barbuda
- Source: CricketArchive, 3 January 2016

Chad Beau Hampson (born March 31, 1988, in New Winthropes, Antigua) is an Antiguan cricketer. who has played for both Leeward Islands cricket team in West Indian domestic cricket. He was named in Stanford Superstars in 2008.
