= Neil Martin (cricketer, born 1979) =

English cricketer

Personal information
- Full name: Neil Donald Martin
- Born: 19 August 1979 (age 47); Enfield, Middlesex, England
- Nickname: Nelly
- Batting: Right-handed
- Bowling: Right-arm fast-medium

Domestic team information
- Years: Team
- 1997–1998: Middlesex

Career statistics
Competition	First-class	List A
Matches	2	2
Runs scored	–	–
Batting average	–	–
100s/50s	–/–	–/–
Top score	–	–
Balls bowled	108	72
Wickets	1	3
Bowling average	83.00	19.00
5 wickets in innings	–	–
10 wickets in match	–	–
Best bowling	1/22	2/28
Catches/stumpings	–/–	1/–
- Source: Cricinfo, 16 March 2012

Neil Donald Martin (born 19 August 1979) is a former English cricketer. Martin was a right-handed batsman who bowled right-arm fast-medium. He was born at Enfield, Middlesex. He was educated in St Albans, Hertfordshire, attending Wheatfields Primary and Verulam School.

Martin made his debut for Middlesex in a List A match against Gloucestershire in the 1997 AXA Life League. In that same season he made a single Youth Test match appearance for England Under-19s against Zimbabwe Under-19s. The following season, he made two first-class appearances for Middlesex against Oxford University and Northamptonshire, he wasn't required to bat in either match and took just a single wicket. He made a second and final List A appearance in that same season, against Essex in the AXA League. taking a total of 3 wickets in this two matches in that format, which came at an average of 19.00, with best figures of 2/28. He wasn't required to bat in either of his List A appearances.
