= Christopher Payne (cricketer) =

English cricketer (born 1947)

Personal information
- Full name: Christopher John Payne
- Born: 30 December 1947 (age 78); Hatfield, Hertfordshire, England
- Batting: Right-handed
- Role: Occasional wicket-keeper

Domestic team information
- Years: Team
- 1975: Minor Counties South
- 1974: Hertfordshire
- 1968–1970: Middlesex

Career statistics
| Competition | First-class | List A |
|---|---|---|
| Matches | 5 | 4 |
| Runs scored | 40 | 35 |
| Batting average | 5.00 | 8.75 |
| 100s/50s | –/– | –/– |
| Top score | 22 | 18 |
| Balls bowled | – | – |
| Wickets | – | – |
| Bowling average | – | – |
| 5 wickets in innings | – | – |
| 10 wickets in match | – | – |
| Best bowling | – | – |
| Catches/stumpings | –/– | 2/– |
- Source: Cricinfo, 17 March 2012

Christopher John Payne (born 30 December 1947) is a former English cricketer. Payne was a right-handed batsman who occasionally fielded as a wicket-keeper. He was born at Hatfield, Hertfordshire.

Payne made his first-class debut for Middlesex against Yorkshire in the 1968 County Championship. He made four further first-class appearances for the county, the last of which came against Essex in the 1970 County Championship. In his five first-class appearances, he scored a total of 40 runs at an average of 5.00, with a high score of 22. He also two List A appearances for the county in the 1970 John Player League, against Derbyshire and Warwickshire, scoring a total of 28 runs.

Leaving Middlesex at the end of the 1970 season, he later played two matches for Hertfordshire in the 1974 Minor Counties Championship, against Bedfordshire and Suffolk. The following season he played two List A matches for Minor Counties South against Kent and Essex, though without success.
