= Maurice Manasseh =

English cricketer

Personal information
- Born: 12 January 1943 (age 83); Calcutta, British India
- Batting: Right-handed
- Bowling: Right-arm off-spin Right-arm medium-pace

Domestic team information
- Years: Team
- 1962 to 1964: Oxford University
- 1964 to 1967: Middlesex

Career statistics
Competition	First-class
Matches	42
Runs scored	1,607
Batting average	25.91
100s/50s	2/6
Top score	129*
Balls bowled	5,480
Wickets	61
Bowling average	41.91
5 wickets in innings	2
10 wickets in match	0
Best bowling	5/51
Catches/stumpings	20/–
- Source: Cricinfo, 17 April 2018

Maurice Manasseh (born 12 January 1943) is a former English first-class cricketer who played for Middlesex and Oxford University from 1962 to 1967. He founded the financial company Investors Planning Associates Ltd in 1970 and served as company chairman for more than 40 years.

== Career ==
Manasseh was born in Calcutta, and educated in England at Epsom College and Oriel College, Oxford. He was one of the leading Public Schools cricketers in 1960 and 1961, a batsman who could score heavily and was difficult to dismiss, and an off-spin bowler with a "perfect" action.

He played for Oxford University from 1962 to 1964. He was one of the team's leading players in 1964, playing in every match, and scoring 129 not out in a team total of 205 against Worcestershire and 45 and 100 not out in the final match against Cambridge University at Lord's. He played a few matches for Middlesex in the County Championship between 1964 and 1967 but with only moderate success.

Manasseh founded Investors Planning Associates Ltd in 1970 and served as company chairman until the company was bought by Succession Wealth in 2019. He was a member of the London Institute of Banking & Finance.
