= Thos Hunt =

English cricketer (born 1982)

Personal information
- Full name: Thomas Aaron Hunt
- Born: 19 January 1982 (age 44); Melbourne, Victoria, Australia
- Batting: Left-handed
- Bowling: Right-arm fast-medium
- Role: Bowler

Domestic team information
- Years: Team
- 2001–2003: Middlesex
- 2004: Somerset
- FC debut: 13 April 2002 Middlesex v Cambridge UCCE
- Last FC: 10 April 2004 Somerset v Loughborough UCCE
- LA debut: 5 June 2001 Middlesex v Australians
- Last LA: 4 July 2004 Somerset v Worcestershire

Career statistics
| Competition | FC | LA | T20 |
|---|---|---|---|
| Matches | 5 | 8 | 6 |
| Runs scored | 4 | 0 | 6 |
| Batting average | 4.00 | 0.00 | 3.00 |
| 100s/50s | 0/0 | 0/0 | 0/0 |
| Top score | 3 | 0 | 4 |
| Balls bowled | 526 | 158 | 24 |
| Wickets | 14 | 5 | 3 |
| Bowling average | 31.44 | 36.20 | – |
| 5 wickets in innings | 0 | 0 | – |
| 10 wickets in match | 0 | 0 | – |
| Best bowling | 4/24 | 2/12 | – |
| Catches/stumpings | 0/– | 1/– | 0/– |
- Source: CricketArchive, 12 May 2022

Thomas Aaron Hunt is an Australian-born former English cricketer who is the grandson of John Hunt, Baron Hunt. He made four first-class appearances during a career that saw him appear for Middlesex and Somerset County Cricket Clubs. The highlight of this was playing in the victorious Middlesex side that beat the touring Australian test team at Lords in 2001, Middlesex being the only side that tour to beat Australia. In 2004, batting at number 11 with John Francis, his four runs helped set a new record tenth wicket partnership for Somerset in Twenty20 cricket.

His career was held back by a consistent cartilage knee injury which forced his to retire at 22. He followed a distinguished junior career playing for England U-14/15/16 prior to injury set backs.
