= Yogesh Golwalkar =

Indian cricketer

Yogesh Ashok Golwalkar is an Indian cricketer. He is a left-handed batsman and a right-arm leg-break bowler. Major Teams – India A, Kings XI Punjab, Middlesex County Cricket Club London (UK), Rest of India for Irani Trophy, Central Zone for Duleep Trophy and Madhya Pradesh (Ranji Trophy).

Golwalkar started playing first-class cricket with Madhya Pradesh in the season 1999–2000, where he spent the majority of his career. His first match was the part of the 2000-1 Ranji Trophy, where the team reached the quarter-finals. Although he played little in his first two seasons, he helped Madhya Pradesh to reach the Plate semi-finals in the 2002–03 season and saw them finish second a year later.

In 2003, Golwalkar led the Madhya Pradesh under-25 County side to its first ever 'National Championship' title which was first time in the history of Madhya Pradesh Cricket that they became national champions in the longer version after the Holkar Team under the leadership of the legend C K Nayudu. In this Under-25 BCCI tournament Golwalkar's strategic, astute and matured leadership was instrumental in their comprehensive win over some of the big teams and favorites such as Mumbai, Punjab and Tamil Nadu.

After the end of the 2003–04 season, Golwalkar performed exceptionally well in the domestic Ranji Trophy season where he picked up his career's first 10 wicket haul against Orissa at the semifinal, followed by another 7 against Maharashtra in the Ranji Trophy Finals in March 2004. As a result, he was picked up for the India-A Tour of Zimbabwe and Kenya (2004) alongside M S Dhoni, Dinesh Karthik, Akash Chopra and Rohan Gavaskar. He played on the India A cricket team, before returning for the next Indian cricket season. After returning from the India-A tour Golwalkar was picked up to play against star-studded Mumbai at the Irani Trophy (2004) where he bowled well and helped his team to beat Ranji champions at Mohali in September 2004.

In the 2004–05 season, Madhya Pradesh made it to the Elite Group of the Ranji Trophy where in one of the crucial games, Golwalkar picked up 8 wickets in one single innings against the strong team Indian Railways which included players like Sanjay Bangar, Jai Prakash Yadav (cricketer), Harvinder Singh (cricketer), followed by 4 wickets against Bengal where he troubled Saurav Ganguly who was asked to play for Bengal against Madhya Pradesh, and praised Golwalkar in a post match conversation. Golwalkar's performances led to his recruitment to Middlesex County Cricket Club. He took 6 wickets in his debut game at Lord's against Kent. He returned to India after only a few games, playing consistently for Madhya Pradesh and bringing them to the semifinals in the Ranji Trophy in 2006. He continued to play for Madhya Pradesh until 2008–09 season and moved to UK to pursue an MBA at Bradford University School of Management UK.

British County Experience – He played as an overseas professional in UK for many years, where he picked up over 90 wickets in his first season (2005) for Atherton Cricket Club with an amazing Hat-Trick in Lancashire and kept on playing as a professional for many years for various English clubs. As a result of his 1st year performance, Middlesex County Cricket Club UK invited Golwalkar to play as an overseas professional along with Scott Styris (NZ). Golwalkar did exceptionally well in his debut game against Kent picking up 6 wickets followed by few wickets against Surrey at Oval and helped Middlesex CCC relegate Surrey after 126 years. Mark Ramprakash in his book mentioned about Golwalkar and how Golwalkar taking wicket of Scott Newman relegated Surrey. At the beginning of 2013 he was called upon by Durham County Cricket Club UK to address their Academy coaches on how to coach leg-spin bowling. In 2013 he played for Hall Bower CC in Yorkshire and did exceptionally well with his best figure 8 for 32 runs in one innings. He was signed by Kings XI Punjab in the Pepsi IPL 2015 auction at Bangalore on 16 February 2015.

Spin Bowling Consultant – In 2018, Andhra Cricket Association invited him as a specialist spin bowling consultant to work with their spinners (of various groups) and share his experience.

Cricket Advisory Committee for Madhya Pradesh – From 2019 to 2022, Golwalkar also served as an honorary member of Cricket Committee (CAC: 2019–2022) for Madhya Pradesh Cricket Association which has the responsibility for appointment and evaluation/review of all coaches, coaching requirements, selection committees and support staff for various state/county teams.
