= James Neville Burnett-Herkes =

Bermudian politician (1912–1979)

James Neville Burnett-Herkes (27 February 1912 - 28 June 1979) was a justice of the peace and member of the colonial parliament of Bermuda for the United Bermuda Party for the constituency of Sandys North. He is buried in Saint James Church cemetery, Somerset, Bermuda.
