= Robin Sims =

English cricketer

Personal information
- Full name: Robin Jason Sims
- Born: 22 November 1970 (age 55); Hillingdon, Middlesex, England
- Batting: Left-handed
- Role: Occasional wicket-keeper

Domestic team information
- Years: Team
- 1992–1993: Middlesex

Career statistics
Competition	First-class	List A
Matches	4	10
Runs scored	31	83
Batting average	10.33	27.66
100s/50s	–/–	–/–
Top score	28	27*
Balls bowled	–	–
Wickets	–	–
Bowling average	–	–
5 wickets in innings	–	–
10 wickets in match	–	–
Best bowling	–	–
Catches/stumpings	2/–	2/–
- Source: Cricinfo, 16 March 2012

Robin Jason Sims (born 22 November 1970) is a former English cricketer. Sims was a left-handed batsman who occasionally fielded as a wicket-keeper. He was born at Hillingdon, Middlesex.

Having played Second XI cricket for Middlesex since 1987, Sims made his first-class debut for the county against the touring Pakistanis in 1992. He made three further first-class appearances for the county, the last of which came against Somerset in the 1993 County Championship. In his four first-class appearances for Middlesex, he scored a total of 31 runs at an average of 10.33, with a high score of 28. Sims also played List A cricket for the county, with his debut in that format coming against Leicestershire in the 1992 Sunday League. He made nine further List A appearances, the last of which came against Somerset in the 1993 AXA Equity & Law League. In his ten List A appearances, he scored a total of 83 runs at an average of 27.66, with a high score of 27 not out.

Arguably his most notable moment on a cricket field came during the 1989 Ashes, when in the 2nd Test at Lord's Cricket Ground, he caught Australian captain Allan Border.
