= Sam Black (cricketer) =

English cricketer (born 1947)

Personal information
- Full name: Christopher James Robert Black
- Born: 15 December 1947 (age 78); Johannesburg, Transvaal, South Africa
- Batting: Right-handed
- Bowling: Right-arm medium-pace

Domestic team information
- Years: Team
- 1970–1973: Middlesex

Career statistics
Competition	First-class	List A
Matches	17	51
Runs scored	400	465
Batting average	16.00	11.34
100s/50s	0/1	0/1
Top score	71	72*
Balls bowled	1158	1537
Wickets	13	53
Bowling average	49.92	21.52
5 wickets in innings	0	1
10 wickets in match	0	–
Best bowling	3/51	6/25
Catches/stumpings	8/–	16/–
- Source: Cricket Archive, 21 August 2014

Christopher James Robert "Sam" Black (born 15 December 1947) is a South African former cricketer who played for Middlesex from 1970 to 1973.

Black was initially educated at Michaelhouse before moving to the United Kingdom. He was an outstanding schoolboy cricketer at Stowe School. In 1966, his final year, he made 473 runs at an average of 43.00 and took 45 wickets at 9.95, and was selected to play for the Marylebone Cricket Club (MCC) Schools XI against Combined Services at Lord's. In Wisden's Public Schools report, E.M. Wellings said Black's "bowling was too fast for most schoolboys and his striking too vigorous for most opposing bowlers".

Black played two first-class matches for Middlesex in 1970 as a bowler, but failed to take a wicket. He also played nine matches in the 40-over John Player League, taking eight wickets. His 13 matches in the John Player League in 1971 included an outstanding performance against Surrey when, in a match reduced by rain to 24 overs a side, he scored 72 not out and took 6 for 25. A few days earlier he had hit his only first-class fifty, 71 against Hampshire, when he "thrashed the new ball so fiercely that he scored at well over a run a minute".

Black appeared in only one first-class match in 1972, and five in 1973, but he was a regular player in the John Player League, taking 14 wickets at 14.78 in 1972 and eight wickets at 16.62 in 1973, including 4 for 20 against Nottinghamshire. Despite making 609 runs at 35.82 and taking 40 wickets at 15.27 for Middlesex Second XI in 1973, he left county cricket after the season.

After leaving Middlesex he married an Australian and moved to Melbourne, where he played for North Melbourne in 1974–75 and 1975–76, winning their best player award in his first season.
