= Nigel Ross (cricketer, born 1882) =

English cricketer

Personal information
- Full name: Nigel Douglas Carne Ross
- Born: 21 December 1882; Penzance, Cornwall, England
- Died: 27 January 1933 (aged 50); Manchester, Lancashire, England

Domestic team information
- Years: Team
- 1910–1912: Buckinghamshire
- 1905: Cambridge University

Career statistics
Competition	First-class
Matches	1
Runs scored	38
Batting average	19.00
100s/50s	0/0
Top score	26
Catches/stumpings	2/–
- Source: Cricinfo, 11 May 2011

Nigel Douglas Carne Ross (21 December 1882 – 27 January 1933) was an English cricketer. Ross' batting and bowling styles are unknown.

The son of Kate Selwyn and Joseph Ross, he was born in Penzance, Cornwall, and was educated at Uppingham School, where he represented the school cricket team. Ross made his only first-class appearance for Cambridge University against Warwickshire in 1905. He scored 12 runs in the university's first-innings, before being dismissed by Sam Hargreave, while in their second-innings he scored 26 runs before being dismissed by Fred Moorhouse.

He made his debut for Buckinghamshire in the 1910 Minor Counties Championship against Devon. He played Minor counties cricket for Buckinghamshire from 1910 to 1912, which included 10 Minor Counties Championship matches. He died in Manchester, Lancashire, on 27 January 1933.
