= 1997 Axa Life League =

- Administrator(s): England and Wales Cricket Board
- Cricket format: Limited overs cricket (40 overs per innings)
- Tournament format(s): League
- Champions: Warwickshire (3rd title)
- Participants: 18
- Matches: 153
- Most runs: 654 Matthew Hayden (Hampshire)
- Most wickets: 31 Peter Martin (Lancashire)

The 1997 Axa Life League was the twenty-ninth competing of what was generally known as the Sunday League. The competition was won for the third time by Warwickshire County Cricket Club.

== Standings ==
Team	Pld	W	T	L	N/R	A	Pts	NetRRN100
Warwickshire (C)	17	13	0	4	0	0	52	14.141
Kent	17	12	0	4	1	0	50	7.709
Lancashire	17	10	1	4	1	1	46	1.894
Leicestershire	17	9	1	5	0	2	42	7.116
Surrey	17	9	0	5	1	2	42	1.061
Somerset	17	9	0	6	0	2	40	4.316
Essex	17	9	1	6	0	1	40	-2.382
Worcestershire	17	8	1	6	1	1	38	6.871
Northamptonshire	17	8	0	6	0	3	38	2.789
Yorkshire	17	8	1	7	0	1	36	5.249
Gloucestershire	17	7	0	6	2	2	36	1.011
Nottinghamshire	17	7	0	7	0	3	34	-0.199
Glamorgan	17	5	0	9	0	3	26	-4.016
Derbyshire	17	4	0	9	0	4	24	-3.047
Hampshire	17	5	0	11	1	0	22	-4.733
Middlesex	17	3	1	10	1	2	20	-8.287
Durham	17	3	0	13	0	1	14	-12.273
Sussex	17	2	0	13	0	2	12	-16.724
Team marked (C) finished as champions. Source: CricketArchive

== See also ==
Sunday League
