= Ed Smith (cricketer) =

English cricketer (born 1977)

Personal information
- Full name: Edward Thomas Smith
- Born: 19 July 1977 (age 49); Pembury, Kent, England
- Nickname: Smudge
- Height: 6 ft 2 in (1.88 m)
- Batting: Right-handed
- Bowling: Right-arm medium
- Role: Batsman

International information
- National side: England
- Test debut (cap 617): 14 August 2003 v South Africa
- Last Test: 4 September 2003 v South Africa

Domestic team information
- Years: Team
- 1996–1998: Cambridge University
- 1996–2004: Kent
- 2005–2008: Middlesex

Career statistics
Competition	Test	FC	LA	T20
Matches	3	191	134	25
Runs scored	87	12,789	3,798	573
Batting average	17.40	41.79	31.13	22.92
100s/50s	0/1	34/54	2/26	0/3
Top score	64	213	122	85
Balls bowled	0	108	0	0
Wickets	–	1	–	–
Bowling average	–	119.00	–	–
5 wickets in innings	–	0	–	–
10 wickets in match	–	0	–	–
Best bowling	–	1/60	–	–
Catches/stumpings	5/–	85/–	29/–	6/–
- Source: Cricinfo, 3 November 2008

Edward Thomas Smith (born 19 July 1977) is an English author and journalist, former professional cricketer, and cricket commentator. He played first-class cricket for Kent, Middlesex and England.

Prematurely retiring from professional cricket due to injury in 2008, at the age of only 31, he became an author and journalist and in 2013 he joined the BBC's Test Match Special as a commentator for The Ashes series against Australia. Smith was England's national selector from 2018 until 2021, when the role was abolished. Smith in 2024, was appointed in a role as part of the Sporting Intelligence department at Derby County Football Club. In October 2025 Smith became President of the MCC.

== Early life ==
Smith was born in Pembury, Kent. He attended Yardley Court and Tonbridge School where he was in the dayboy house Welldon House and his father, novelist Jonathan Smith, taught English for most of his career. He went on to Peterhouse, Cambridge to study history and earned a full blue playing for the university cricket team. He scored a century on his first-class debut for Cambridge University Cricket Club in 1996 and graduated with a double first despite devoting much of his time to cricket.

== Cricket ==
Smith played three home Test matches for England against South Africa in 2003. He made 64 on debut, but scored only 23 runs in his next four innings, and was dropped for the subsequent tour of the Indian subcontinent.

Smith was a tall right-handed batsman with a penchant for the drive and represented England, Cambridge University, Kent and Middlesex.

During thirteen seasons of first-class cricket, he scored 34 centuries. He hit a peak in 2003, scoring 135, 0, 122, 149, 113, 203, 36, 108 and 32 for Kent in July of that year. He averaged 72.99 for the 2003 first-class season when he was selected for England.

He left his native county following the 2004 season and joined Middlesex for 2005. He captained the county for two seasons during 2007 and 2008. After missing most of the 2008 season due to an ankle injury, Smith announced his retirement later that year.

In 2012, Smith became a commentator for the BBC's Test Match Special.

He continued to play cricket as an amateur on the Authors XI team, which is composed of British authors and journalists, and contributed a chapter to the team's book The Authors XI: A Season of English Cricket from Hackney to Hambledon.

== Literary career ==
Smith's first book, Playing Hard Ball, describes his interest in the game, psychology, history and mythology of American baseball and compares it to cricket. His diary of the 2003 season, On and Off the Field, was named the 2005 Wisden Book of the Year, and was shortlisted for the William Hill Sports Book of the Year and The Cricket Society Book of the Year Award in 2004. In Luck: What it Means and Why it Matters (2012) Smith examines the concepts of luck, fortune, destiny and fate in sport and beyond.

Smith is also a regular columnist and contributed cricket book reviews for the Wisden Cricketers' Almanack and history book reviews for the Sunday Telegraph. He wrote a weekly column for the New Statesman. In July 2016, Smith was accused of plagiarism in an article he wrote for Cricinfo. The article was subsequently removed from the website, with editor-in-chief Sambit Bal noting that the article "bore striking similarities to parts of a piece published in the Economist a few days prior".

== Football ==
In June 2024, Smith was appointed in a role the Sporting Intelligence department at Derby County in association football, working alongside former England cricket head of performance Mo Bobat as Derby looked to introduce an AI programme to help with player recruitment, performance and sports science. Smith and Bobat left their roles at the club on 1 October 2025, to return to cricket, it was stated they would still advise the club in the future if required.

== London Spirit & MCC presidency ==
On 1 October 2025, Smith returned to cricket take up a role at The Hundred franchise London Spirit. He also became president of the MCC.

== Bibliography ==
- Smith, E. T. (2003) Playing Hard Ball. Abacus Books. ISBN 978-0349116662
- Smith, Ed (2005). On and Off the Field. Penguin Books. ISBN 978-0141015897
- Smith, Ed (2009). What Sport Tells Us About Life. Penguin Books. ISBN 978-0141031859
- Smith, Ed (2012). Luck: What it Means and Why it Matters. Bloomsbury Publishing. ISBN 978-1408815472
- Smith, Ed (2022). Making Decisions. William Collins. ISBN 978-0008530181

Sporting positions
Preceded by Ben Hutton	Middlesex County Cricket captain 2007–08	Succeeded by Shaun Udal
