= Paul Hutchison (English cricketer) =

English cricketer (born 1977)

Personal information
- Full name: Paul Michael Hutchison
- Born: 9 June 1977 (age 49); Leeds, Yorkshire, England
- Batting: Left-handed
- Bowling: Left-arm fast-medium

Domestic team information
- Years: Team
- 1995/96–2001: Yorkshire
- 2002–2003: Sussex
- 2004–2005: Middlesex

Career statistics
Competition	FC	LA	T20
Matches	62	54	5
Runs scored	305	97	0
Batting average	8.71	8.08	–
100s/50s	–/–	–/–	–/–
Top score	30	20	0*
Balls bowled	9,091	2,251	80
Wickets	184	71	4
Bowling average	28.56	23.01	27.50
5 wickets in innings	7	–	–
10 wickets in match	1	–	–
Best bowling	7/31	4/29	2/22
Catches/stumpings	14/–	8/–	1/–
- Source: Cricinfo, 25 December 2021

Paul Michael Hutchison (born 9 June 1977, Leeds, Yorkshire, England) is an English former first-class cricketer. He was a left-handed batsman, and a left-arm fast-medium bowler.

Hutchison played for the Under-17 and Under-19 England team. On Hutchison's first-class debut for Yorkshire County Cricket Club in 1997, he took 7 for 38, followed by a County Championship debut tally of 7 for 50, recording the best Yorkshire debut bowling return since Wilfred Rhodes in 1898. He went on to play thirty nine first-class matches for Yorkshire between 1996 and 2001, taking 143 wickets at 22.68, before being released by the county.

At the start of the 1996 season Hutchison was selected to play in the Test trial match at Chelmsford where he played for 'The Rest of England' against England 'A'. The highlight being dismissing Nasser Hussain in the second innings.

Hutchison also toured with England 'A' twice, firstly to Kenya and Sri Lanka in 1997/98 and then Zimbabwe and South Africa in 1998/99. Injury to his back cut short this tour and he returned home with a stress fracture to the back. An injury that would trouble him for the rest of his career.

He joined Sussex in 2002, but, beset by injury, he only stayed two years before moving to Middlesex. However, he only made two first-class appearances in 2005. His most recent non first-class appearance was at Lord's in June 2007, when he took 2 for 35 for the Marylebone Cricket Club (MCC) against a European XI.

Since retiring from first-class cricket Hutchison has been involved in cricket at varying levels. He is the former head coach to the Swedish Cricket Federation, is an active scout for one of the 18 first-class Counties and spent time as cricket chairman at Pudsey St Lawrence Cricket Club and New Farnley Cricket Club in the Bradford Premier League.

Hutchison was appointed as director of cricket and men's head coach at Jersey in March 2024. He resigned from the role in September 2025.
