= Bob Herkes =

English cricketer

Personal information
- Full name: Rob Herkes
- Born: 30 June 1957 (age 69); Lincoln, Lincolnshire, England
- Batting: Right-handed
- Bowling: Right-arm fast medium

Domestic team information
- Years: Team
- 1978–1979: Middlesex
- 1977: Lincolnshire

Career statistics
Competition	First-class	List A
Matches	3	3
Runs scored	0	6
Batting average	0.00	3.00
100s/50s	–/–	–/–
Top score	0*	5
Balls bowled	184	144
Wickets	6	2
Bowling average	15.50	54.00
5 wickets in innings	1	–
10 wickets in match	–	–
Best bowling	6/60	2/18
Catches/stumpings	–/–	–/–
- Source: Cricinfo, 8 April 2012

Bob Herkes (born 30 June 1957) is a former English cricketer. Herkes was a right-handed batsman who bowled right-arm fast medium pace. He was born at Lincoln, Lincolnshire.

Herkes made his debut in county cricket for Lincolnshire against the Lancashire Second XI in 1977. He made eight further appearances for the county in what would be his only season with his home county. The following season he joined Middlesex, making his first-class debut for the county in that season against the Marylebone Cricket Club at Lord's. He made two further first-class appearances for the county, both in the 1979 County Championship against Sussex and Worcestershire. Herkes failed to score any runs in first-class cricket, while in his primary role as a bowler, he took 6 wickets at an average of 15.50. All of these wickets came in a single innings against Worcestershire. Herkes also played List A cricket for Middlesex, making his debut in that format against Leicestershire in the 1978 John Player League. He made two further appearances in that format, both in the 1979 John Player League against Essex and Sussex. He took just 2 wickets in his three appearances, at an average of 54.00, with best figures of 2/18. He left Middlesex following the 1979 season.
