= Ian Hutchinson (cricketer) =

Welsh cricketer (born 1964)

Personal information
- Full name: Ian James Frederick Hutchinson
- Born: 31 October 1964 (age 62); Welshpool, Montgomeryshire, Wales
- Batting: Right-handed
- Bowling: Right-arm medium-fast
- Relatives: Gordon Hutchinson (brother)

Domestic team information
- Years: Team
- 1985: Shropshire
- 1987–1991: Middlesex
- FC debut: 18 June 1988 Middlesex v Northamptonshire
- Last FC: 2 July 1991 Middlesex v Warwickshire
- LA debut: 3 July 1985 Shropshire v Northamptonshire
- Last LA: 11 July 1991 Middlesex v Somerset

Career statistics
Competition	First-class	List A
Matches	27	19
Runs scored	1,435	221
Batting average	34.16	13.81
100s/50s	5/2	0/0
Top score	201*	42
Balls bowled	72	24
Wickets	1	1
Bowling average	29.00	27.00
5 wickets in innings	0	0
10 wickets in match	0	0
Best bowling	1/18	1/10
Catches/stumpings	29/–	11/–
- Source: CricketArchive, 2 January 2011

Ian James Frederick Hutchinson (born 31 October 1964) is a Welsh former first-class cricketer, who played for Middlesex County Cricket Club. He was educated at Shrewsbury School.

He was a county cricketer for Shropshire, appearing in one match in 1984 when he made 46 runs from both innings, while playing at club level for Shrewsbury.

Hutchinson played five seasons of county cricket for Middlesex, 1987–1991, but was a first-team regular for just two of them. He made his List A cricket debut in 1985 for Shropshire and his first-class debut in 1988; his final county appearance in both forms was in 1991.

A right-handed, middle order batsman, he made 27 first-class appearances; his highest score was 201 not out against Oxford University cricket team in 1989. In 1985, playing club cricket for Cross Arrows cricket club, he scored 204 from 124 balls before lunch, including 14 sixes.
