= Nigel Ross (cricketer, born 1953) =

English cricketer (born 1953)

Nigel Patrick Dorai Ross (born 5 April 1953 in Chelsea, London) was an English cricketer.

Nigel Ross was a right-handed batsman and wicket-keeper who represented Middlesex in 25 first-class matches between 1973 and 1977. He played his initial appearances as a specialist batsman. He initially became the regular wicketkeeper following John Murray's retirement in 1975.

He failed to command a regular place and was replaced by Ian Gould. He was not re-engaged following the 1977 season.
