= Melvyn Betts =

English cricketer (born 1975)

Melvyn Morris Betts (born 26 March 1975) is an English cricketer. He is a right-handed batsman and a right-arm medium-fast bowler.

Born in Sacriston, County Durham, Betts was educated at Fyndoune Community College in Sacriston. Betts participated in Under-19s cricket and Under-20s cricket with Durham, but left in September 2000 upon the refusal of an improvement in his contract. In November, Betts drew up a three-year contract with Warwickshire after they had lost Ed Giddins, Allan Donald an
