= Colin Cook (cricketer) =

English cricketer (born 1960)

Colin Roy Cook (born 11 January 1960) is an English former cricketer who played eleven first-class matches for Middlesex between 1981 and 1984.

Cook also played for Durham University and the alumni team of Merchant Taylors' School, Northwood. He later worked as a cricket coach in Australia.
