= Tom Scollay =

Australian cricketer

Personal information
- Full name: Thomas Edward Scollay
- Born: 28 November 1987 (age 38); Alice Springs, Northern Territory, Australia
- Batting: Right-handed
- Bowling: Right arm off-break

Domestic team information
- Years: Team
- 2010–2012: Middlesex (squad no. 5)
- LA debut: 5 July 2010 Middlesex v Bangladesh

Career statistics
Competition	List A	T20
Matches	10	6
Runs scored	117	55
Batting average	13.00	11.00
100s/50s	0/0	0/0
Top score	32	19
Balls bowled	24	–
Wickets	1	–
Bowling average	21.00	–
5 wickets in innings	0	–
10 wickets in match	0	–
Best bowling	1/21	–
Catches/stumpings	3/–	1/–
- Source: Cricinfo, 1 April 2013

Thomas Edward Scollay (born 28 November 1987) is an Australian former professional cricketer, a right-handed batsman and right-arm off-break bowler who most recently played for Middlesex. After leaving Middlesex he started his own coaching company. He is a Level 2 Cricket Australia Coach and is active on YouTube. He continues to play Grade cricket in Australia for Perth Cricket Club.

Scollay was born in Alice Springs, Northern Territory, Australia. He made his debut for Middlesex in a tour match against the Bangladeshis in July 2010 and scored three runs. His top score for Middlesex in List A cricket came in 2010 in a game against Yorkshire at Lord's; he scored 32 from 33 balls. His only wicket came in the same match as he bowled four overs for 21 runs. His T20 debut came for Middlesex against Hampshire in July 2011.
