= Stephen Poulter (cricketer) =

English cricketer

Personal information
- Full name: Stephen John Poulter
- Born: 9 September 1956 (age 70); Hornsey, Middlesex, England
- Batting: Right-handed

Domestic team information
- Years: Team
- 1984: Buckinghamshire
- 1978: Middlesex

Career statistics
Competition	First-class	List A
Matches	3	2
Runs scored	47	15
Batting average	15.66	7.50
100s/50s	0/0	0/0
Top score	36	13
Catches/stumpings	0/–	0/–
- Source: Cricinfo, 14 May 2011

Stephen John Poulter (born 9 September 1956) is a former English cricketer. Poulter was a right-handed batsman. He was born in Hornsey, Middlesex.

Poulter made his first-class debut for Middlesex against Nottinghamshire in 1978 County Championship. He played 2 further first-class matches that season, against Yorkshire and Derbyshire. In his 3 first-class matches, he scored 47 runs at a batting average of 15.66, with a highest score of 36. It was also in 1978 that he made his List A debut for Middlesex, making 2 appearances against Yorkshire and Sussex in the 1978 John Player League. In these 2 matches, he scored 15 runs at an average of 7.50, with a highest score of 13. He played Second XI cricket for Middlesex the following season, but after that his services were not retained.

Poulter later represented Buckinghamshire in a single Minor Counties Championship match against Devon in 1984.
