= David Ling (cricketer) =

English cricketer (1946–2018)

David John Ling (2 July 1946 – 3 November 2018) was a former English first-class cricketer.

He was born in Enfield, Middlesex. before representing Middlesex (1966–1968) and Suffolk (1963–1971) as a right-hand batsman and right-arm medium-fast bowler.

He died in November 2018 aged 72.
