= David Nash (cricketer) =

English cricketer

Personal information
- Full name: David Charles Nash
- Born: 19 January 1978 (age 48); Chertsey, Surrey, England
- Nickname: Nashy, Knocker, Ledge
- Height: 5 ft 7 in (1.70 m)
- Batting: Right-handed
- Role: Wicket-keeper

Domestic team information
- Years: Team
- 1995–2009: Middlesex
- FC debut: 23 April 1997 Middlesex v Cambridge University
- Last FC: 21 July 2009 Middlesex v Derbyshire
- LA debut: 17 September 2005 Middlesex v Somerset
- Last LA: 23 May 2009 Middlesex v Hampshire

Career statistics
Competition	First-class	List A
Matches	140	121
Runs scored	5,684	1,500
Batting average	35.52	20.83
100s/50s	11/27	0/6
Top score	114	67
Balls bowled	90	–
Wickets	2	–
Bowling average	52.50	–
5 wickets in innings	0	–
10 wickets in match	0	–
Best bowling	1/8	–
Catches/stumpings	297/23	92/18
- Source: CricketArchive (subscription required), 26 January 2011

David Charles Nash (born 19 January 1978) is a retired English cricketer who spent the entirety of his long career with Middlesex. He spent 13 seasons at the county, playing over 250 first team matches, primarily as a wicketkeeper. He was honoured by England at Under-19 and A-team level, but never played a full international for his country.

== Early years of cricket ==
David Charles Nash was born in Chertsey, Surrey on 19 January 1978. He was educated at Sunbury Manor and Malvern College. His two years at Malvern College saw records tumble: the 1995 season had Malvern's "best results since the war" as they won 9 and drew 9 of their 18 matches, with Nash topping the batting averages with 687 runs at 62.45. Nash's 1996 season then saw him break numerous school individual season records, as he set new highs of 1,093 runs (at 68.31), 23 dismissals and 13 stumpings.

=== U-19 international career ===
Before commencing his professional career, Nash played extensively at international Under-19 level. He made his U-19 test debut under the captaincy of Marcus Trescothick against South Africa, scoring an unbeaten 56 in the first innings, and putting on a record 108 for the last wicket with Umer Rashid, rescuing England from 115/9. He scored a further half century in the second U-19 Test; this led to a second record partnership in consecutive matches, as he put on 146 with Rashid, this time for the 8th wicket. He finished a personally successful series with 98 not out in the third U-19 Test, being left stranded just short of his century as the last wicket fell.

Following his successful summer season, Nash was included in the squad for England U-19's tour of Zimbabwe in January 1996. After a washed out first U-19 test, Nash scored an unbeaten 65 in England's only innings in the second U-19 test, as they won by an innings after dismissing Zimbabwe for 47 in the first innings. He made a further not out half century in the third and final U-19 Test, putting on a partnership of 139 with his Middlesex colleague Owais Shah, once again in a heavy England victory. Nash was retained in the side for the three summer 1996 U-19 Tests against New Zealand, but was not as notably successful as in his earlier series, finishing with a highest score of 49 not out.

Nash's final international U-19 series came in the December 1996 tour of Pakistan. After an unmemorable first U-19 Test performance, Nash had his finest international performance in the second U-19 Test, making his debut U-19 international century, with 108 not out in the first innings being followed by 87 in the second before being run out.

=== Middlesex second XI ===
Nash broke into the Middlesex second XI in the 1994 season, aged just 16. In that season, he played in just four matches, but was successful in them, scoring 219 runs at an average of 43.80, with a highest score of 77. His 1995 season proceeded in similar vein, with five games bringing him 237 runs, including a first century at county second XI level. The 1996 season once again saw Nash appear in five second XI matches, with excellent returns: in six innings he was dismissed only three times, with one century and two half centuries, while against Somerset at Uxbridge he shared a partnership of 249 with Keith Dutch.

== Professional at Middlesex ==
Nash's first-class debut came against Cambridge University in April 1997. He did not keep wicket in this game- unlike most he would play for Middlesex- and only batted in the second innings, scoring 21 before being caught and bowled by off-spinner James Freeth. His county championship debut did not come until August at Chester-le-Street, where his "nimble footwork" brought him 94 runs to make him top scorer in Middlesex's sole innings. He subsequently played in all of the remaining four championship fixtures, accruing 311 runs at 62.20, including his first first-class century against Essex, to finish with the highest average amongst the Middlesex squad. He also played in two matches in the Axa Life League.

His promising performances in his first few first-class matches earned him an immediate call up to the England A tour of Kenya and Sri Lanka in January 1998 as one of the two wicket-keepers along with Chris Read. His England A debut came against Colts XI in Colombo, and saw him make 5 in his only innings, while taking three catches. His only other first-class match on the tour was in the second A team Test against Sri Lanka A, and saw him making only 16 runs across his two innings.

In more regular action in the 1998 County Championship, playing 12 matches, Nash was unable to replicate his returns of 1997, scoring 361 runs at 21.23 as Middlesex finished 17th. The highlight of his first-class season was a score of 114 against Somerset, as part of a stand of 222 with Justin Langer. By 1999, Nash had become a regular in the Middlesex side, playing in 16 of the 17 championship matches, scoring 632 runs at 37.17- despite failing to score any centuries- while taking 44 catches and 3 stumpings. However, despite his efforts, Middlesex had a poor season, finishing 16th in the County Championship, and 7th in division 2 of the Sunday League. After his diminished performances, Nash was not selected on England A's January 1999 tour to Zimbabwe and South Africa.

1999 saw improvement in Nash's returns for Middlesex: in the County Championship he scored 632 runs at an average of 37.17, with Wisden commenting that he "kept wicket tidily and claimed 50 first-class dismissals, to go with nearly 700 crucial runs". Nash's improvement did not translate into better results for Middlesex, who finished 16th in the Championship and lost their opening match in the Natwest Trophy. Nash in 2000 "had a goodish year behind the stumps" although he lost his place in Middlesex's limited overs side. He finished the season with 445 Championship runs at 20.22, along with 36 dismissals; for the second successive season, he did not score any centuries. He was also awarded his county cap.

Overall, Nash played 257 matches for Middlesex in both first-class and List A cricket as a wicket-keeper and right-handed batsman.

Injury limited his appearances during Middlesex's 2004 and 2005 seasons, when Ben Scott assumed his wicket-keeping role. He was awarded a Benefit in 2007, following his service to the club. He is currently the county club's eighth most prolific wicketkeeper in first-class cricket.

He was awarded a benefit year in 2007, deciding to raise the funds solely for The Shooting Star Children's Hospice. He was still playing for Middlesex in 2008. He announced his retirement at the end of the 2009 season. It brought to end a 22-year career, with Nash saying he'd "lived his dream and it was someone else's turn."

He became a cricket coach for Maccabi GB in 2018, visiting Israel for the first time for the job. He was also working in advertising.
