= Ben Scott (cricketer) =

English cricketer (born 1981)

Personal information
- Full name: Ben James Matthew Scott
- Born: 4 August 1981 (age 45); Isleworth, London Borough of Hounslow
- Nickname: Scotty
- Height: 5 ft 7 in (1.70 m)
- Batting: Right-handed
- Role: Wicketkeeper

Domestic team information
- Years: Team
- 2002–2003: Surrey
- 2004–2011: Middlesex
- 2010–2011: → Worcestershire (loan)
- 2012: Worcestershire

Career statistics
| Competition | FC | LA | T20 |
|---|---|---|---|
| Matches | 80 | 105 | 73 |
| Runs scored | 2,881 | 873 | 449 |
| Batting average | 28.81 | 19.40 | 16.03 |
| 100s/50s | 3/17 | 0/4 | 0/0 |
| Top score | 164* | 73* | 43* |
| Catches/stumpings | 221/22 | 83/31 | 23/27 |
- Source: CricInfo, 6 June 2011

Benjamin James Matthew Scott (born 4 August 1981) is a former English first-class cricketer. He was a right-handed batsman and wicket-keeper. He was born in Isleworth in the London Borough of Hounslow.

== Early career ==
Ben Scott began playing his cricket at Wycombe House Cricket Club. Scott began to work on his batting and progressed through the Middlesex Colts Age groups before signing for the Middlesex. A lack of opportunities meant that he crossed the Thames and moved to Middlesex's local rivals Surrey for one season, where he was behind Jonathan Batty as first choice wicket-keeper.

== Middlesex return ==
Scott moved back to Middlesex in 2004.

Scott had had limited wicket-keeping opportunities, prior to the absence of David Nash due to an injury in 2004. During this time, he claimed his first century against Northamptonshire. He made 50 dismissals in 2005, ensuring Middlesex avoided relegation.

During the 2008 season Scott was the wicketkeeper and began to find some form with the bat climbing up the Batting order. Middlesex won the T20 Cup and were invited to play in the West Indies in the Stanford Series.

Scott's Nephew Joel Pope is following in his footsteps from Wycombe House onto the County Cricket Circuit, beginning his career with Leicestershire County Cricket Club.

Scott was selected for the England Lions tour of New Zealand in February 2009.

With wicketkeeping opportunities at Middlesex limited due to the presence of John Simpson in the first team, Scott played for Worcestershire during the 2010 and 2011 season, on loan. Scott joined Worcestershire on a permanent basis for the 2012 season.

Scott was released by Worcestershire in 2012 and announced his retirement from professional cricket a few days later.
