= List of Cambridge University Cricket Club players =

This is a list in alphabetical order of cricketers who have played for Cambridge University Cricket Club (CUCC) in top-class matches since the club was established in 1820. Until 2020, a number of CUCC matches had first-class cricket status. In 1972 and 1974 the team also played official List A cricket matches.

Some CUCC players have been members of teams representing combinations of British Universities or, from 2001, the Cambridge University Centre of Cricketing Excellence (CUCCE), later rebranded the Cambridge MCCU. These team included students from Anglia Ruskin University, as well as Cambridge University, and played some first-class matches. After the establishment of Cambridge UCCE, the annual three-day first-class University Match against Oxford University Cricket Club was replaced by a one-day match against Oxford at Lord's and a four-day first-class match against Oxford, alternating between Fenner's and The University Parks. The 2020 fixture was the last match with first-class status, although the fixture is still played. This list includes only those players who have represented CUCC itself in first-class matches. Players who have represented the Cambridge UCCE and MCCU In first-class matches can be found in List of Cambridge UCCE & MCCU players.

The details are the player's usual name followed by the years in which he was active as a CUCC player and then his name is given as it would appear on modern match scorecards. Note that many players represented other first-class teams besides CUCC.

== A ==
- Jamie Abbott (2013–2016) : J. B. Abbott
- John Abercrombie (1838) : J. Abercrombie
- Michael Abington (1992) : M. B. Abington
- Charlie Absolom (1866–1869) : C. A. Absolom
- David Acfield (1966–1968) : D. L. Acfield
- John Adair (1875) : J. F. Adair
- Eric Forbes Adam (1908–1911) : E. G. Forbes Adam
- Keith Adams (1954) : K. Adams
- Lestock Adams (1908–1910) : L. H. Adams
- Richard Adams (1859) : R. L. Adams
- David Aers (1966–1968) : D. R. Aers
- William Agar (1836) : W. T. Agar
- Alexandre Kreme Agedah (2020) : A.K. Agedah
- Manraj Ahluwalia (1985–1987) : M. S. Ahluwalia
- Ronnie Aird (1923) : R. Aird
- Mark Alban (1989) : M. T. Alban
- Charles Alexander (1870–1871) : C. R. Alexander
- Gerry Alexander (1952–1953) : F. C. M. Alexander
- Henry Alexander (1862–1863) : H. R. T. Alexander
- Mark Allbrook (1975–1978) : M. E. Allbrook
- Charles Allcock (1878) : C. H. Allcock
- Antony Allen (1932–1934) : A. W. Allen
- Allen (1820) : Allen
- Basil Allen (1932–1933) : B. O. Allen
- Gubby Allen (1922–1923) : G. O. B. Allen
- Maurice Allom (1926–1928) : M. J. C. Allom
- Herbert Allsopp (1876) : H. T. Allsopp
- Nicholas Alwyn (1961) : N. Alwyn
- Aaran Amin (2019–2020) : A. R. Amin
- Michael Anderson (1937–1938) : M. H. Anderson
- Frederic Anderton (1953) : F. M. Anderton
- Charles Andreae (1929) : C. M. Andreae
- Rob Andrew (1984–1985) : C. R. Andrew
- Akbar Ansari (2008–2010) : A. S. Ansari
- Zafar Ansari (2011–2013) : Z. S. Ansari
- Geoffrey Anson (1947) : G. F. Anson
- Thomas Anson (1839–1842) : T. A. Anson
- John Anton (1949–1950) : J. H. H. Anton
- Sir Edward Antrobus, 8th Baronet (1963) : E. P. Antrobus
- Geoffrey Antrobus (1925) : G. J. Antrobus
- John Antrobus (1826) : J. Antrobus
- Myles Arkell (1953–1955) : R. H. M. Arkell
- Henry Arkwright (1829–1834) : H. Arkwright
- Henry Arkwright (1858) : H. Arkwright
- Vernon Armitage (1864) : V. K. Armitage
- Alban Arnold (1912–1914) : A. C. P. Arnold
- Jonathan Arscott (1990–1993) : J. P. Arscott
- Edward Ash (1865) : E. P. Ash
- Selby Ash (1858) : S. A. H. Ash
- Anand Ashok (2008–2011) : A. Ashok
- Claude Ashton (1921–1923) : C. T. Ashton
- Gilbert Ashton (1919–1921) : G. Ashton
- Hubert Ashton (1920–1922) : H. Ashton
- Philip Ashton (2008–2011) : P. P. Ashton
- John Askew (1931) : J. G. Askew
- John Asquith (1953–1954) : J. P. K. Asquith
- Michael Atherton (1987–1989) : M. A. Atherton
- Gerald Atkins (1960–1961) : G. Atkins
- Jon Atkinson (1988–1990) : J. C. M. Atkinson
- Harold Austin (1924) : H. M. Austin
- Matt Austin (2006–2007) : M. L. Austin
- Preston Austin (1848) : P. B. Austin
- Christopher Aworth (1973–1975) : C. J. Aworth
- Ian Axford (1960) : W. I. Axford

== B ==
- Harold Bache (1909–1910) : H. G. Bache
- Mervyn Baggallay (1909–1911) : M. E. C. Baggallay
- Thomas Bagge (1859–1861) : T. E. Bagge
- Hamer Bagnall (1923–1925) : H. F. Bagnall
- Paul Bail (1986–1988) : P. A. C. Bail
- Matthew Bailey (1997) : M. R. K. Bailey
- Trevor Bailey (1947–1948) : T. E. Bailey
- Edward Baily (1872–1874) : E. P. Baily
- Robert Baily (1905–1908) : R. E. H. Baily
- Herbert Bainbridge (1884–1886) : H. W. Bainbridge
- Matthew Baines (1883) : M. T. Baines
- Threlfall Baines (1930) : T. W. T. Baines
- Robert Bairamian (1957) : R. Bairamian
- Edward Baker (1912–1914) : E. C. Baker
- Fergus Baker (2007–2009) : F. B. Baker
- Nigel Baker (1934–1935) : N. E. W. Baker
- Richard Baker (1973–1974) : R. K. Baker
- William Baker (1843) : W. D. Baker
- Thomas Balderson (2018–2019) : T. W. Balderson
- Robert Drummond Balfour (1863–1866) : R. D. Balfour
- Vikram Banerjee (2004–2006) : V. Banerjee
- Stephen Banister (1938–1939) : S. M. A. Banister
- Charles Bannister (1975–1978) : C. S. Bannister (Note: Bannister played 17 first-class matches for the university between 1975 and 1977, taking 19 wickets and scoring 383 runs. Born at Redhill in 1956, he made two List A appearances for Combined Universities, played age-group and Second XI cricket for Surrey, and went on to play Minor Counties cricket for Hertfordshire.)
- Bob Barber (1955–1957) : R. W. Barber
- Elphinstone Barchard (1846–1848) : E. Barchard
- Charles Barclay (1859–1860) : C. Barclay
- Shivaan Bardolia (2016) : S. Bardolia
- Michael Barford (1969–1971) : M. T. Barford
- Giles Baring (1930–1931) : A. E. G. Baring
- George Barker (1840) : G. Barker
- Kenneth Barker (1899) : K. E. M. Barker
- George Barnard (1825–1826) : G. W. Barnard
- Freeman Barnardo (1939) : F. F. T. Barnardo
- Frederic Barnes (1948) : F. B. Barnes
- William Barnett (1849–1850) : W. E. Barnett
- Michael Barnwell (1965–1966) : L. M. L. Barnwell
- James Barrington (1980–1982) : W. E. J. Barrington
- Ian Bartholomew (2004–2006) : I. D. Bartholomew
- Hugh Bartlett (1934–1936) : H. T. Bartlett
- Michael Bashforth (1994) : M. C. Bashforth
- John Bastard (1838–1840) : J. H. Bastard
- Richard Bate (1987–1989) : R. Bate
- Augustus Bateman (1859–1862) : A. Bateman
- Elliot Bath (2012–2014) : E. R. Bath
- William Bather (1882–1883) : W. H. Bather
- Robert Battiscombe (1819–1821) : R. S. Battiscombe
- Richard Battye (1995) : R. A. Battye
- Robert Bayford (1857–1860) : R. A. Bayford
- David Beaumont (1977–1978) : D. J. Beaumont (Note: Born at West Bridgford in 1944 and educated at Bradford Grammar School before going up to Wolfson College, Beaumont scored 258 runs in 11 first-class appearances for the university in 1977 and 1978. His father, Len Beaumont, was a professional footballer who had also played club cricket and was a cricket scorer for Nottinghamshire.)
- Herbert Benbow (1881) : H. C. Benbow
- Andrew Benke (1962) : A. F. Benke (Note: Benke played 19 first-class matches for the university in 1962, taking 50 wickets and scoring 240 runs. Born at Southampton, he was educated at Cheltenham College before going up to Sydney Sussex College. He later played for the Club Cricket Conference and MCC amongst other teams.)
- Barrie Bennett (1979) : B. W. P. Bennett (Note: Bennett went up to Cambridge after having attended the Royal Military Academy, Sandhurst. Born at RAF Abyad in Egypt in 1955, he was commissioned in the Royal Engineers, reaching the rank of major. Whilst at Cambridge he played two first-class matches, scoring four runs. He also played Army cricket.)
- Tris Bennett (1923–1925) : C. T. Bennett
- Charles Benstead (1920–1921) : C. R. Benstead
- William Benthall (1857–1860) : W. H. Benthall
- Richard Beresford (1889–1891) : R. A. A. Beresford
- Richard Bernard (1958–1960) : J. R. Bernard
- Paul Best (2011–2013) : P. M. Best
- Anand Bhatia (1969) : A. N. Bhatia
- Malcolm Birks (1995–2000) : M. J. Birks
- Michael Bishop (1976–1978) : M. M. Bishop
- Robert Bisseker (1904) : R. G. Bisseker
- Paul Blackburn (1954) : P. H. Blackburn
- William Blacker (1873–1876) : W. Blacker
- John Blake (1938–1939) : J. P. Blake
- Richard Blaker, born 1821 (1842–1843) : R. N. Blaker
- Richard Blaker, born 1879 (1899–1902) : R. N. R. Blaker
- Richard Blatcher (1955–1956) : R. B. Blatcher
- Edward Bligh (1819) : E. Bligh
- Ivo Bligh, 8th Earl of Darnley (1878–1881) : I. F. W. Bligh
- Stuart Block (1999–2001) : S. A. A. Block
- Spencer Block (1928–1929) : S. A. Block
- Henry Blofeld (1958–1959) : H. C. Blofeld
- Alex Blofield (2015) : A. D. Blofield
- Francis Blomfield (1847–1849) : F. Blomfield
- Edward Blore (1848–1856) : E. W. Blore
- Denis Blundell (1928–1929) : E. D. Blundell
- Peter Bodkin (1946) : P. E. Bodkin
- Henry Boldero (1851–1853) : H. K. Boldero
- Hugh Bompas (1901–1903) : H. S. Bompas
- Cecil Booth (1923) : C. Booth (Note: Born at Aylesbury in 1895, Booth played seven first-class matches for the university in 1923, taking seven wickets and scoring 94 runs. He had previously played in the Minor Counties Championship for Surrey Second XI. Booth died at Peterborough in 1988, aged 92.)
- Clement Booth (1862–1865) : C. Booth
- Henry Booth (1835–1836) : H. W. Booth
- Granger Boston (1946) : G. F. Boston
- Niel Botha (2020) : N. Botha
- George Boudier (1840–1847) : G. J. Boudier
- Alfred Bourne (1870) : A. A. Bourne
- Donald Bousfield (1935) : D. G. Bousfield
- Robin Boyd-Moss (1980–1983) : R. J. Boyd-Moss
- Cedric Boyns (1976) : C. N. Boyns
- John Bradshaw (1833–1835) : J. Bradshaw
- David Brand (1922) : D. F. Brand
- Ruel Brathwaite (2009) : R. M. R. Brathwaite
- Edward Bray senior (1869–1872) : E. Bray
- Edward Bray junior (1896–1897) : E. H. Bray
- Henry Braybrooke (1891) : H. M. Braybrooke
- Mike Brearley (1961–1968) : J. M. Brearley
- Martin Breddy (1982–1984) : M. N. Breddy
- Charles Brereton (1858–1860) : C. J. Brereton (Note: The son of a clergyman, Brereton was born at Briningham Hall in North Norfolk and educated at Marlborough College where he played cricket. He played four first-class matches for the university and one for Cambridgeshire, all in 1858. He later played for the Gentlemen of Norfolk and Norfolk in non-first-class matches until 1870. After graduating from St John's College in 1860 he qualified as a priest and served at Ely, Lichfield, and Eccleshall before becoming the rector of Thornage-with-Brinton in Norfolk in 1863. He remained in the post until his death at Thornage in 1898 aged 59.)
- Philip Brett (1846) : P. Brett
- Charles Bridgeman (1872–1873) : C. G. O. Bridgeman
- William Bridgeman, 1st Viscount Bridgeman (1887–1888) : W. C. Bridgeman
- Leslie Bridges (1911) : L. W. Bridges
- Patrick Briggs (1963–1964) : P. D. Briggs
- John Brocklebank (1936) : J. M. Brocklebank
- Thomas Brocklebank (1919–1920) : T. A. L. Brocklebank
- Arthur Brodhurst (1937–1939) : A. H. Brodhurst
- James Brodie (1959–1960) : J. B. Brodie
- Peter Brodrick (1959–1961) : P. D. Brodrick
- Richard Bromley (1970) : R. C. Bromley
- Hugh Bromley-Davenport (1892–1893) : H. R. Bromley-Davenport
- Mervyn Brooker (1974–1976) : M. E. W. Brooker
- Geoffrey Brooke-Taylor (1919–1920) : G. P. Brooke-Taylor
- Ronald Brooks (1919–1920) : R. C. Brooks
- Robert Broughton (1836–1839) : R. J. P. Broughton
- Adrian Brown (1982–1986) : A. D. Brown
- Frankie Brown (2009–2013) : F. A. Brown
- Freddie Brown (1930–1931) : F. R. Brown
- Rainy Brown (1925) : G. R. R. Brown
- Richard Brown (1830–1833) : R. L. Brown
- Cyril Browne (1913–1919) : C. R. Browne
- David Browne (1985–1986) : D. W. Browne
- Francis Browne (1920–1922) : F. B. R. Browne
- Charles Brune (1866–1870) : C. J. Brune
- John Brunton (1894) : J. D. Brunton
- Jack Bryan (1921) : J. L. Bryan
- David Buchanan (1850–1851) : D. Buchanan
- John Buchanan (1906–1909) : J. N. Buchanan
- A. David Buckingham (1955) : A. D. Buckingham
- George Buckston (1903) : G. M. Buckston
- James Bulwer (1841) : J. B. R. Bulwer
- Lord Burghley (1846–1847) : Lord Burghley
- Tolly Burnett (1948–1950) : A. C. Burnett
- Ian Burnley (1982–1984) : I. D. Burnley
- Cuthbert Burnup (1895–1898) : C. J. Burnup
- George Burr (1840–1841) : G. F. Burr
- John Burrough (1893–1895) : J. Burrough
- Cecil Burton (1907–1908) : D. C. F. Burton
- Lindsay Bury (1877–1878) : L. Bury
- Thomas Bury (1853–1855) : T. W. Bury
- William Bury (1859–1862) : W. Bury
- Damien Bush (1989–1991) : D. J. Bush
- Michael Bushby (1952–1954) : M. H. Bushby
- Edward Butler (1888–1889) : E. M. Butler
- Henry Butterworth (1929–1930) : H. R. W. Butterworth
- Cyril Buxton (1885–1888) : C. D. Buxton
- Alan Buzza (1989–1990) : A. J. Buzza

== C ==
- Russell Cake (1993–1996) : R. Q. Cake
- Will Caldecourt (1833) : W. H. Caldecourt
- Freddie Calthorpe (1912–1919) : F. S. G. Calthorpe
- Edmund Calverley (1846–1855) : E. Calverley
- Charles Calvert (1846–1848) : C. T. Calvert
- John Cameron (1934–1937) : J. H. Cameron
- Dudley Campbell (1853–1854) : D. Campbell
- Straton Campbell (1845) : S. C. Campbell
- John Candler (1894–1895) : J. P. Candler
- Barron Cangley (1947) : B. G. M. Cangley
- Jeremy Caplan (1962) : J. J. N. Caplan
- Philip Carling (1967–1970) : P. G. Carling
- Duncan Carmichael (1936–1937) : D. S. Carmichael
- George Carnegie-Brown (1926) : G. Carnegie-Brown
- Michael Carr (1952–1953) : M. L. Carr
- Bertram Carris (1938–1939) : B. D. Carris
- Harold Carris (1930) : H. E. Carris
- John Carroll (1992–1995) : J. P. Carroll
- Robert Carter-Shaw (1962) : R. Carter-Shaw
- Henry Casson (1850–1852) : H. Casson
- George Cavendish-Bentinck (1841) : G. A. F. Cavendish-Bentinck
- Edward Cawston (1932–1933) : E. Cawston
- George Cayley (1854) : G. A. Cayley
- Grant Celliers (2006) : G. Celliers
- Robert Chambers (1965–1966) : R. E. J. Chambers
- Frederick Champion de Crespigny (1843) : F. J. Champion de Crespigny
- Gordon Chandler (1929) : G. M. Chandler
- Percy Chapman (1920–1922) : A. P. F. Chapman
- Charles Chapman, born 1806 (1825–1831) : C. Chapman
- Charles Chapman, born 1860 (1882–1883) : C. E. Chapman
- David Chapman (1876–1877) : D. M. B. Chapman
- Graham Charlesworth (1993) : G. M. Charlesworth
- James Chervak (2005–2006) : J. A. Chervak
- Darshan Chohan (2015–2018) : D. Chohan
- Alfred Christopher (1843) : A. M. W. Christopher
- John Christopherson (1931) : J. C. Christopherson
- David Churton (1995–1997) : D. R. H. Churton
- Antony Clark (1980–1981) : A. R. Clark
- Adam Clarke (2001–2004) : A. C. S. Clarke (Note: Born at Nottingham in 1981 and educated at Kimberley Comprehensive School before going up to Downing College, Clarke made his first-class debut for Cambridge UCCE in 2001 before playing in the 2001 and 2004 University Matches for the university. He has since played club cricket for Free Foresters.)
- Donald Clarke (1946) : D. H. Clarke
- Lionel Clarke (1995–1997) : L. P. Clarke
- Simon Clarke (1961–1962) : S. J. S. Clarke
- Reynold Clement (1854) : R. A. Clement
- Stephen Clissold (1844–1846) : S. T. Clissold
- Roger Clitheroe (1987–1991) : R. I. Clitheroe
- Peter Close (1964–1965) : P. A. Close
- Philip Cobbold (1896) : P. W. Cobbold
- Ralph Cobbold (1926–1927) : R. H. Cobbold
- Frank Cobden (1870–1872) : F. C. Cobden
- John Cockburn-Hood (1864–1867) : J. S. E. Cockburn-Hood
- John Cockett (1951) : J. A. Cockett
- Timothy Coghlan (1958–1960) : T. B. L. Coghlan
- Toby Colbeck (1905–1906) : L. G. Colbeck
- George Cole (1908) : G. L. Cole
- Terence Cole (1898) : T. G. O. Cole
- Arthur Coleridge (1850) : A. D. Coleridge
- George Coles (1819–1820) : G. Coles
- Walter Coles (1949) : W. N. Coles
- Boris Collingwood (1948) : B. E. Collingwood
- Benjamin Collins (1998–2001) : B. J. Collins (Note: Collins played 15 first-class matches for the university from 1998 to 2001 and three for Cambridge UCCE in 2001. Born in London in 1977 and educated at St Albans School before going up to Girton College, he also played Minor Counties cricket for Hertfordshire in 1998 and 1999 and has played club matches for MCC.)
- David Collins (1908–1911) : D. C. Collins
- Thomas Collins (1861–1864) : T. Collins
- Francis Collyer (1967–1969) : F. E. Collyer
- William Collyer (1864) : W. R. Collyer
- Tom Colverd (2016–2018) : T. G. L. Colverd
- Joseph Comber (1931–1933) : J. T. H. Comber
- Richard Compton-Burnett (1981) : R. J. Compton-Burnett
- Eric Conradi (1946) : E. R. Conradi
- Arthur Coode (1898) : A. T. Coode
- Geoffrey Cook (1956–1958) : G. W. Cook
- Matthew Cook (2008–2010) : M. P. Cook
- Charles Cooke (1857–1860) : C. R. Cooke
- Fraser Cooke (1994) : F. J. Cooke
- William Cookesley (1822–1827) : W. G. Cookesley
- Indrajit Coomaraswamy (1971–1972) : I. Coomaraswamy
- Norman Cooper (1891–1892) : N. C. Cooper
- Nicholas Cooper (1979) : N. H. C. Cooper
- Tom Corner (2018) : T. P. Corner
- Nick Cosh (1966–1968) : N. J. Cosh
- Archie Cotterell (1983–1985) : T. A. Cotterell
- George Edward Cotterill (1858–1860) : G. E. Cotterill
- George Cotterill (1888–1890) : G. H. Cotterill
- Daniel Cotton (1989–1991) : D. C. Cotton (Note: Born at Bletchley in 1968 and educated at Merchant Taylors' School before going up to St Catharine's College, Cotton played three first-class matches for the university in 1989 and one in 1991, although he did not win a Blue.)
- Graham Cottrell (1965–1968) : G. A. Cottrell
- Peter Cottrell (1979) : P. R. Cottrell
- Stephen Coverdale (1974–1977) : S. P. Coverdale
- Fred Covington (1935) : F. E. Covington
- Alexander Cowie (1910–1911) : A. G. Cowie
- Alexander Cox (1887) : A. R. Cox
- Ramsay Cox (1934) : H. R. Cox
- Frederick Crabtree (1894) : F. L. Crabtree
- Richard Cragg (1970) : J. R. A. Cragg
- James Craib (1937) : J. D. G. Craib
- Edward Craig (1961–1963) : E. J. Craig
- Frederick Craven (1833) : F. K. Craven
- Neil Crawford (1978–1980) : N. C. Crawford
- Robert Crawford (1891) : R. O. Crawford
- Eustace Crawley (1887–1889) : E. Crawley
- Henry Crawley (1886) : H. E. Crawley
- John Crawley (1991–1993) : J. P. Crawley
- Leonard Crawley (1923–1925) : L. G. Crawley
- Peter Crawley (1992) : P. M. Crawley
- Richard Crawley (1852) : R. S. Crawley
- Ruari Crichard (2015–2017) : R. J. Crichard
- Jonathan Crocker (1894) : J. A. Crocker
- Peter Downton Croft (1955–1957) : P. D. Croft
- Charles Crofts (1843) : C. D. Crofts
- Dennis Crookes (1953–1954) : D. V. Crookes
- Anthony Cross (1966–1967) : A. J. Cross
- Jan Cross-Zamirski (2018–2019) : J. O. Cross-Zamirski
- Frederick Crowder (1820) : F. R. Crowder
- Barry Cumberlege (1913) : B. S. Cumberlege
- Henry Curgenven (1897) : H. G. Curgenven
- Cecil Currie (1883) : C. E. Currie
- Sir Frederick Currie, 2nd Baronet (1845) : F. L. Currie
- Thomas Curteis (1864–1865) : T. S. Curteis
- Tim Curtis (1983) : T. S. Curtis
- Edward Cuthbertson (1908–1910) : E. H. Cuthbertson
- Geoffrey Cuthbertson (1920–1922) : G. B. Cuthbertson
- Roy Cutler (1965–1966) : R. W. Cutler

== D ==
- Joseph Dacre (1845–1847) : J. Dacre
- John Dale (1868–1870) : J. W. Dale
- Hartley Dales (1929–1931) : H. H. Dales
- Angus Dalgleish (2016–2017) : A. D. Dalgleish
- Pieter de Vos Daneel (2020) : P.D. Daneel
- Adrian Daniel (1975–1977) : A. R. H. Daniel
- Arthur Daniel (1861–1864) : A. W. T. Daniel
- John Daniell (1899–1901) : J. Daniell
- David Daniels (1964–1965) : D. M. Daniels
- Andrew Danson (1999–2000) : A. R. Danson
- Mathew Daplyn (1833) : M. Daplyn
- Shonu Das (1992) : S. S. K. Das
- Punya Datta (1947) : P. B. Datta
- John Davidson (1985–1987) : J. E. Davidson
- Andrew Davies (1982–1989) : A. G. Davies
- Geoffrey Dawson (1913–1914) : G. B. Davies
- Jack Davies (1931–1934) : J. G. W. Davies
- John Davies (1956–1958) : J. T. Davies
- Eddie Dawson (1924–1927) : E. W. Dawson
- Mark Dawson (1996–1997) : M. W. Dawson
- Anthony Day (1953) : A. S. Day
- Samuel Day (1899–1902) : S. H. Day
- Tommy de Grey (1862–1865) : T. de Grey
- Ernest de Little (1888–1889) : E. R. de Little
- Percy de Paravicini (1882–1885) : P. J. de Paravicini
- William de St Croix (1839–1842) : W. de St Croix
- Herman de Zoete (1897–1898) : H. W. de Zoete
- William Deacon (1848–1850) : W. S. Deacon
- Peter Deakin (1996) : P. J. Deakin
- John Dearlove (1954) : J. A. Dearlove
- Tom Deasy (2011) : T. J. Deasy
- John Deedes (1822) : John Deedes
- Henry Denman (1950–1952) : H. W. Denman
- David Dew (1959) : D. G. D. Dew
- Alistair Dewhurst (2017–2019) A.C.H. Dewhurst
- Charles Dewé (1901) : C. D. E. Dewé
- Jim Dewes (1978–1979) : A. R. Dewes
- John Dewes (1945–1950) : J. G. Dewes
- Edward Dewing (1842–1845) : E. M. Dewing
- Ted Dexter (1956–1958) : E. R. Dexter
- Jovan Dhariwal (2020) : J. S. Dhariwal
- David Dickinson (1953) : D. C. Dickinson
- Patrick Dickinson (1939) : P. J. Dickinson
- Graham Dill (2001) : G. J. Dill
- Hugh Dinwiddy (1934–1935) : H. P. Dinwiddy
- Anthony Dixon (1971) : A. S. Dixon
- Graham Doggart (1919–1922) : A. G. Doggart
- Hubert Doggart (1948–1950) : G. H. G. Doggart
- James Hamilton Doggart (1919) : J. H. Doggart
- Simon Doggart (1980–1983) : S. J. G. Doggart
- Christian Doll (1901) : C. C. T. Doll
- Mordaunt Doll (1908) : M. H. C. Doll
- John Dolphin (1825–1827) : J. Dolphin
- Arthur Dorman (1886) : A. W. Dorman
- James Douglas (1892–1894) : J. Douglas
- Robert Noel Douglas (1890–1892) : R. N. Douglas
- Simon Douglas-Pennant (1959–1961) : S. Douglas-Pennant
- Tom Dowdall (2014) : T. R. Dowdall
- Edward Dowell (1844–1845) : E. W. Dowell
- Keith Downes (1939) : K. D. Downes
- Edward Dowson (1900–1903) : E. M. Dowson
- Nigel Draffan (1971–1972) : N. G. H. Draffan
- Edward Drake (1852–1855) : E. T. Drake
- Thomas Drakes (1929) : T. E. Drakes
- Lancelot Driffield (1900–1902) : L. T. Driffield
- Eliot Druce (1897–1898) : E. A. C. Druce
- George Druce (1842) : G. Druce
- Frank Druce (1894–1897) : N. F. Druce
- Walter Druce (1894–1895) : W. G. Druce
- Alfred du Cane (1854–1855) : A. R. du Cane
- Duleepsinhji (1925–1928) : K. S. Duleepsinhji
- Adam Duncan (1875) : A. S. D. Duncan
- George Dupuis (1854–1857) : G. R. Dupuis
- Harry Dupuis (1828–1830) : H. Dupuis
- Richard Dutton (1981–1982) : R. S. Dutton
- Geoffrey Dyer (1990) : G. B. A. Dyer
- Edwin Dyke (1864–1865) : E. F. Dyke
- Thomas Dykes (1844) : T. Dykes

== E ==
- Michael Earls-Davis (1947) : M. R. G. Earls-Davis
- Hubert Eaton (1885) : H. F. J. Eaton
- Charles Ebden (1901–1903) : C. H. M. Ebden
- Geoffrey Edge (1957–1958) : G. D. Edge
- Phil Edmonds (1971–1973) : P. H. Edmonds
- Mike Edwards (1960–1962) : M. J. Edwards
- Robert Edwards (1849–1850) : R. S. Edwards
- Timothy Edwards (1979–1981) : T. D. W. Edwards
- Merrick Elderton (1907) : M. B. Elderton
- Bernard Elgood (1948) : B. C. Elgood
- George Elliot (1831) : G. Elliot
- Tom Elliott (2012–2014) : T. C. Elliott
- Edward Ellis (1829–1835) : E. C. Ellis
- Charles Ellison (1982–1986) : C. C. Ellison
- Henry Ellison (1833–1837) : H. J. Ellison
- Edward Elmhirst (1834) : E. Elmhirst
- Richard Elmhirst (1822–1825) : R. Elmhirst
- Connor Emerton (2016) : C. J. Emerton
- Henry Enthoven (1923–1926) : H. J. Enthoven
- Noël Estcourt (1953–1954) : N. S. D. Estcourt
- Charles Evans (1871) : C. W. H. Evans
- Jonno Evans (2012) : J. J. Evans
- Ralph Evans (1913) : R. D. Evans
- Robert Evans (1920–1921) : R. G. Evans
- Percy Exham (1880–1881) : P. G. Exham
- Charles Eyre (1903–1906) : C. H. Eyre

== F ==
- Howard Fabian (1929–1931) : A. H. Fabian
- Gordon Fairbairn (1912–1919) : G. A. Fairbairn
- Walter Fairbanks (1875) : W. Fairbanks
- Valentine Faithfull (1841) : V. G. Faithfull
- Faqir Aizazuddin (1957) : S. A. U. Fakir
- Harry Falcon (1914) : J. H. Falcon
- Michael Falcon (1908–1911) : M. Falcon
- Archibald Fargus (1900–1901) : A. H. C. Fargus
- Arthur Farmer (1834–1836) : A. A. Farmer
- Ken Farnes (1931–1933) : K. Farnes
- George Fauquier (1819–1821) : G. L. W. Fauquier
- Edward Fawcett (1859–1861) : E. B. Fawcett
- David Fell (1985–1987) : D. J. Fell
- Samuel Fenn (1851) : S. Fenn
- William Fenn (1848–1851) : W. M. Fenn
- Derek Fenner (1954) : D. A. Fenner
- Francis Fenner (1839) : F. P. Fenner
- Nigel Fenton (1988–1991) : N. C. W. Fenton
- Arthur Fernie (1897–1900) : A. E. Fernie
- Charles Fiddian-Green (1921–1922) : C. A. F. Fiddian-Green
- Edwin Field (1893–1894) : E. Field
- Max Field (1974) : M. N. Field
- William Findlay (1930) : W. S. Findlay
- James Fitzgerald (1966–1968) : J. F. Fitzgerald
- Robert Allan Fitzgerald (1854–1856) : R. A. Fitzgerald
- Padraic Flanagan (2020) : P. J. Flanagan
- Robert Fleming (1974) : R. C. J. Fleming
- Cyril Foley (1888–1891) : C. P. Foley
- Charles Foley (1880) : C. W. Foley
- Augustus Ford (1878–1881) : A. F. J. Ford
- Francis Ford (1887–1890) : F. G. J. Ford
- William Ford (1873–1874) : W. J. Ford
- Humphrey Forman (1910) : H. Forman
- Miles Formby (1925) : M. R. Formby
- Ralph Forster (1859) : R. Forster
- Matthew Fosh (1977–1978) : M. K. Fosh
- Robert Fowler (1876) : R. H. Fowler
- Thomas Fowler (1862–1864) : T. F. Fowler
- Thomas Francis (1923–1925) : T. E. S. Francis
- Walter Franklin (1911–1913) : W. B. Franklin
- Thomas Fraser (1936–1937) : T. W. Fraser
- John Freer (1826–1827) : J. L. Freer
- James Freeth (1995–1997) : J. W. O. Freeth
- Thomas French (1841–1844) : T. L. French
- Lionel Frere (1892) : L. R. T. Frere
- Kenneth Fry (1902–1904) : K. R. B. Fry
- Cornelius Fryer (1854–1856) : C. W. H. Fryer
- Frederick Fryer (1870–1873) : F. E. R. Fryer
- Ernest Fuller (1852) : E. A. Fuller
- John Fuller (1855–1858) : J. M. Fuller

== G ==
- Frederick Gaddum (1880–1882) : F. D. Gaddum
- K. S. Gaekwar (1939) : K. S. Gaekwar
- Stuart Gardiner (1978) : S. J. Gardiner
- Paul Garlick (1984) : P. L. Garlick
- James Garnett (1833) : J. Garnett
- Leslie Gay (1891–1893) : L. H. Gay
- George Gerds (1887) : G. F. Gerds
- Paul Gibb (1935–1938) : P. A. Gibb
- Richard Gibb (1938) : R. C. Gibb
- Clement Gibson (1920–1921) : C. H. Gibson
- John Gibson (1855) : J. S. Gibson
- Brian Gidney (1963) : B. B. Gidney
- Derek Gillespie (1938–1939) : D. W. Gillespie
- James Ewan Gillespie (2020) : J. E. Gillespie
- Arthur Gilligan (1919–1920) : A. E. R. Gilligan
- James Gilman (1901–1902) : J. Gilman
- Ronald Gilson (1930) : R. L. D. Gilson
- Christopher Gimson (1908) : C. Gimson
- John Glennie (1848) : J. D. Glennie
- Mervin Glennie (1939) : M. S. Glennie
- Richard Godsell (1903–1904) : R. T. Godsell
- Charles Goldie (1846) : C. D. Goldie
- Chris Goldie (1980–1982) : C. F. E. Goldie
- Andrew Golding (1984–1988) : A. K. Golding
- George Goldney (1838) : G. Goldney
- Anthony Goodfellow (1960–1962) : A. Goodfellow
- Daniel Goodwin (2010) : D. M. Goodwin
- Harold Goodwin (1906–1908) : H. J. Goodwin
- Timothy Goodyer (1999) : T. E. Goodyer
- Gamini Goonesena (1954–1957) : G. Goonesena
- Francis Gordon (1829–1830) : F. A. Gordon
- Shaun Gorman (1985–1987) : S. R. Gorman
- Cunliffe Gosling (1888–1890) : R. C. Gosling
- Anthony Gould (1964–1966) : A. V. E. Gould
- W. G. Grace junior (1894–1896) : W. G. Grace junior
- John Graham (1892) : J. Graham
- Charles Grainger (1879) : C. E. Grainger
- Chris Grammer (2009) : C. M. Grammer
- Jackie Grant (1928–1930) : G. C. Grant
- Rolph Grant (1932–1933) : R. S. Grant
- David Gray (1947–1948) : D. A. A. Gray
- Horace Gray (1894–1896) : H. Gray
- Henry Grazebrook (1828–1830) : H. G. Grazebrook
- Theophilus Greatorex (1884–1886) : T. Greatorex
- Charles Green (1865–1868) : C. E. Green
- David Green (1957–1959) : D. J. Green
- Frederick Greenfield (1873–1876) : F. F. J. Greenfield
- William Greenstock (1886–1887) : W. Greenstock
- William Greenway (1819–1820) : W. W. Greenway
- John Greenwood (1820–1821) : J. Greenwood
- James Greenwood (2010) : J. M. Greenwood
- Ian Greig (1977–1979) : I. A. Greig
- Henry Grierson (1911–1912) : H. Grierson
- Arthur Griffin (cricketer) (1908–1910) : A. W. M. S. Griffin
- George Griffith (1949–1951) : G. H. C. Griffith
- Mike Griffith (1963–1965) : M. G. Griffith
- Billy Griffith (1934–1936) : S. C. Griffith
- Peter Griffiths (1982) : P. D. Griffiths
- Hugh Griffiths, Baron Griffiths (1946–1948) : W. H. Griffiths
- Alexander Grimes (1984–1985) : A. D. H. Grimes
- James Grimshaw (1932–1935) : J. W. T. Grimshaw
- Francis Grimston (1843–1845) : F. S. Grimston
- Joseph Grout (1838–1839) : J. Grout
- Frederick Gruggen (1844–1845) : F. J. Gruggen
- Philip Gurdon (1822) : P. Gurdon
- William Gurdon (1825) : W. Gurdon
- James Guthrie (1953) : J. S. Guthrie
- John Guthrie (1819–1820) : J. Guthrie

== H ==
- Anthony Hadingham (1932–1933) : A. W. G. Hadingham
- Robert Hadley (1971–1973) : R. J. Hadley
- Herbert Hake (1920–1921) : H. D. Hake
- Charles Hale (1832) : C. Hale
- Harold Hale (1887–1890) : H. Hale
- John Hales (1855–1859) : J. Hales
- John Hall (1969–1970) : J. E. Hall
- Michael Hall (1994) : M. A. T. Hall
- Peter Hall (1948–1949) : P. J. Hall
- Richard Halsall (1999) : R. G. Halsall
- Sir Thomas Halsey, 3rd Baronet (1920) : T. E. Halsey
- H. A. Douglas-Hamilton (1873–1875) : H. A. Hamilton
- William Hammersley (1847) : W. J. Hammersley
- Octavius Hammond (1855–1857) : O. Hammond
- Henry Hand (1828–1840) : H. G. Hand
- Edwin Handley (1827) : E. H. Handley
- Henry Hannington (1819–1821) : H. Hannington
- William Harbinson (1926–1929) : W. K. Harbinson
- John Richard Hardy (1829) : J. R. Hardy
- Thomas Hare (1953) : T. Hare
- Edward Harenc (1840–1841) : E. A. F. Harenc
- Leonard Harper (1901–1903) : L. V. Harper
- Nicholas Harper (1961) : N. J. Harper
- James Harris (1859) : J. E. Harris
- Stanley Harris (1902–1904) : S. S. Harris
- Philip Harrison (1905–1907) : W. P. Harrison
- Richard Hart (1987–1988) : R. J. Hart
- Edward Hartnell (1844) : E. G. Hartnell
- Edward Hartopp (1841–1842) : E. S. E. Hartopp
- Edmund Harvey (1872) : E. Harvey
- Jonathan Harvey (1963–1965) : J. R. W. Harvey
- William Harvey (1831) : W. W. Harvey
- Ashby Haslewood (1833–1835) : A. B. Haslewood
- Nick Haste (1993–1996) : N. J. Haste
- Martin Hawke, 7th Baron Hawke (1882–1885) : Lord Hawke
- Richard Hawkey (1949–1950) : R. B. Hawkey
- Herbert Hawkins (1896–1899) : H. H. B. Hawkins
- Peter Hayes (1974–1977) : P. J. Hayes
- John Haynes (1945–1946) : J. P. Haynes
- David Hays (1965–1968) : D. L. Hays
- Bill Hayward (1950–1953) : W. I. D. Hayward
- David Haywood (1968) : D. C. Haywood
- Arthur Hazlerigg, 2nd Baron Hazlerigg (1930–1932) : A. G. Hazlerigg junior
- Timothy Head (1986) : T. J. Head
- John Healing (1894) : J. A. Healing
- Russell Heap (1988–1990) : R. Heap
- Alex Hearne (2013–2016) : A. G. Hearne
- Duncan Heath (2002–2005) : D. R. Heath
- John Heath (2001–2003) : J. A. Heath
- Stephen Heath (1986–1988) : S. D. Heath
- John Heathcote (1820–1826) : J. M. Heathcote
- George Helm (1861–1864) : G. F. Helm
- Thomas Hemingway (2007–2008) : T. L. Hemingway
- William Hemingway (1895–1896) : W. M. Hemingway
- William Hemming (1848) : W. S. Hemming
- Philip Hemsley (1980–1981) : P. D. Hemsley
- Steve Henderson (1982–1983) : S. P. Henderson
- Perceval Henery (1881–1883) : P. J. T. Henery
- Arthur Henfrey (1890) : A. G. Henfrey
- Nicholas Héroys (1960) : N. Héroys
- Lord Charles Hervey (1835) : Lord C. A. Hervey
- Richard Hesketh (2010) : R. L. Hesketh
- Gerald Heslop (1898) : G. G. Heslop
- Gethyn Hewan (1938) : G. E. Hewan
- Philip Hewett (1820) : P. Hewett
- Steven Hewitt (1983–1984) : S. G. P. Hewitt
- James Heywood (2003–2008) : J. J. N. Heywood
- Robert Hibbert (1832) : R. Hibbert
- Matt Hickey (2011–2013) : M. R. Hickey
- Alastair Hignell (1975–1978) : A. J. Hignell
- Arthur Hill (1890–1893) : A. J. L. Hill
- Mervyn Hill (1923–1924) : M. L. Hill
- Anthony Hillary (1951) : A. A. Hillary
- Wilfred Hill-Wood (1921–1922) : W. W. H. Hill-Wood
- Chris Hillyard (2004) : C. M. Hillyard
- Alfred Hind (1898–1901) : A. E. Hind
- John Hirsch (1903–1904) : J. G. Hirsch
- Christopher Hirst (1967) : C. H. Hirst
- Arthur Hoare (1844–1847) : A. M. Hoare
- Edward Hoare (1831) : E. Hoare
- John Gurney Hoare (1831) : J. G. Hoare
- Wilfred Hoare (1931) : W. N. S. Hoare
- Barry Hobson (1946) : B. S. Hobson
- Edward Hodgson (1835–1836) : E. F. Hodgson
- James Hodgson (1994) : J. S. Hodgson
- Ian Hodgson (1980–1983) : K. I. Hodgson
- Phillip Hodson (1971–1973) : R. P. Hodson
- George Hollest (1821) : G. E. Hollest
- David Holliday (1979–1981) : D. C. Holliday
- Norman Holloway (1910–1912) : N. J. Holloway
- Holmes (1832) : Holmes
- Richard Holmes (1974) : W. R. Holmes (note: played for CUCC in List A but not in a first-class match)
- Nathaniel Hone (1881) : N. T. Hone
- George Hone-Goldney (1873) : G. H. Hone-Goldney
- Anthony Hooper (1987–1992) : A. M. Hooper
- Ferdinand Hope-Grant (1861–1863) : F. C. Hope-Grant
- Charlie Hopkins (2010) : C. E. H. Hopkins
- William Hopkins (1825–1828) : W. Hopkins
- John Hopley (1904–1906) : F. J. V. Hopley
- Geoffrey Hopley (1911–1914) : G. W. V. Hopley
- Albert Hornby (1898) : A. H. Hornby
- Edward Horne (1855–1858) : E. L. Horne
- Edward Horsman (1827–1829) : E. Horsman
- Sir John Hoskyns, 15th Baronet (1949) : J. C. Hoskyns
- Anthony Hossack (1889) : A. H. Hossack
- Neil Hotchkin (1934–1935) : N. S. Hotchkin
- Will House (1996–1998) : W. J. House
- Edward How (1994–1997) : E. J. How
- Arthur Howard (1961) : A. S. Howard
- Gerald Howard-Smith (1901–1903) : G. Howard-Smith
- Michael Howat (1977–1980) : M. G. Howat
- Robert Howell (1898–1899) : R. G. D. Howell
- Richard Howitt (2000) : R. W. J. Howitt
- Christopher Howland (1958–1960) : C. B. Howland
- Peter Howland (1969) : P. C. Howland
- Ralph Huband (1923) : R. C. Huband
- Edward Hughes (1995) : E. R. Hughes
- Gwyn Hughes (1965) : G. Hughes
- Owen Hughes (1910) : O. Hughes
- Phil Hughes (2010–2015) : P. H. Hughes
- Quentin Hughes (1997–2000) : Q. J. Hughes
- Thomas Hughes (1843–1845) : T. F. Hughes
- Toby Hughes (2000–2002) : T. R. Hughes
- John Human (1932–1934) : J. H. Human
- Roger Human (1930–1931) : R. H. C. Human
- Abraham Hume (1839–1844) : A. Hume
- George Hume (1821–1826) : G. S. Hume
- Alex Hunt (2015) : A. P. Hunt
- Louis Hunt (1929) : L. E. Hunt
- Robert Hunt (1935–1937) : R. G. Hunt
- Charles Hunter (1889) : C. H. Hunter
- Alan Hurd (1958–1960) : A. Hurd
- Gordon Hutchinson (1990) : G. M. Hutchinson
- Andrew Hutson (1972) : A. M. Hutson
- Henry Hutson (1886) : H. W. Hutson
- Richard Hutton (1962–1964) : R. A. Hutton
- Rupert Huxter (1981) : R. J. A. Huxter
- Lord Hyde (1865–1866) : Lord Hyde
- Edward Hyde (2018–2020) : E. R. B. Hyde
- Bruce Hylton-Stewart (1912–1914) : B. D. Hylton-Stewart
- Henry Hyndman (1864–1865) : H. M. Hyndman

== I ==
- Iftikhar Bukhari (1957) : Iftikhar Bukhari
- Alan Imlay (1906–1907) : A. D. Imlay
- Imraan Mohammad (1997–1999) : Imraan Mohammad
- Reggie Ingle (1924–1926) : R. A. Ingle
- Charles Ingram (1854–1859) : C. P. Ingram
- Doug Insole (1947–1949) : D. J. Insole
- John Frederick Ireland (1908–1911) : J. F. Ireland
- Leonard Irvine (1926–1928) : L. G. Irvine
- Izhan Khan (2014) : Izhan Khan

== J ==
- Ben Jacklin (2005–2008) : B. D. Jacklin
- Edward Jackson (1974–1976) : E. J. W. Jackson
- Stanley Jackson (1890–1893) : F. S. Jackson
- John Jackson (1920) : J. A. S. Jackson
- Samuel Jagger (1923–1926) : S. T. Jagger
- M. Jahangir Khan (1933–1936) : M. Jahangir Khan
- Michael James (2006–2008) : M. I. James
- Michael James (1956–1958) : R. M. James
- Steve James (1989–1990) : S. P. James
- Harold Jameson (1938) : H. G. Jameson
- Thomas Jameson (1970) : T. E. N. Jameson
- Adam Janisch (1995–1998) : A. N. Janisch
- David Jarrett (1976) : D. W. Jarrett
- Michael Jarrett (1991–1993) : M. E. D. Jarrett
- Lewis Jarvis (1877–1879) : L. K. Jarvis
- Richard Jefferson (1961) : R. I. Jefferson
- George Jeffery (1872–1874) : G. E. Jeffery
- Rory Jenkins (1990–1993) : R. H. J. Jenkins
- Charles Jenner (1825–1830) : C. H. Jenner
- Herbert Jenner (1825–1827) : H. Jenner
- Henry Jenner (1840–1841) : H. L. Jenner
- Charles Jenyns (1849–1850) : C. F. G. Jenyns
- Digby Jephson (1890–1892) : D. L. A. Jephson
- Gilbert Jessop (1896–1899) : G. L. Jessop
- Nathan Johns (2019) : N. R. Johns
- Adam Johnson (2001) : A. H. V. Johnson
- George Randall Johnson (1854–1859) : G. R. Johnson
- Peter Johnson (1970–1972) : P. D. Johnson
- Peter Johnson (1947) : P. L. Johnson
- Peter Randall Johnson (1900–1901) : P. R. Johnson
- Richard Johnson (1850) : R. C. Johnson
- Simon Johnson (1990–1992) : S. W. Johnson
- Con Johnstone (1919–1920) : C. P. Johnstone
- Arthur Jones (1892–1893) : A. O. Jones
- Ian Jones (1959) : C. I. M. Jones
- Garri Jones (1991–1994) : G. W. Jones
- Steffan Jones (1997) : P. S. Jones
- Robin Jones (1996–1997) : R. O. Jones
- Richard Jones (1877–1880) : R. S. Jones
- John Jones-Bateman (1848) : J. B. Jones-Bateman
- Tony Jorden (1968–1970) : A. M. Jorden
- Jasper Joyce (2011–2013) : J. L. Joyce
- Arthur Judd (1927) : A. K. Judd
- John Judd (1831) : J. P. Judd

== K ==
- Mahendra Kasippillai (1956–1957) : M. Kasippillai
- Walter Kavanagh (1834) : W. Kavanagh
- Michael Kaye (1937–1938) : M. A. C. P. Kaye
- Herbert Keigwin (1901) : H. S. Keigwin
- Richard Keigwin (1903–1906) : R. P. Keigwin
- Peter Kelland (1949–1950) : P. A. Kelland
- Owen Kember (1963) : O. D. Kember
- George Kemp, 1st Baron Rochdale (1885–1888) : G. Kemp
- Kenneth Kemp (1873) : K. H. Kemp
- Robin Kemp (2004–2008) : R. A. Kemp
- Trevor Kemp (1992) : T. R. Kemp
- Matthews Kempson (1851–1856) : S. M. E. Kempson
- William Kempson (1855) : W. J. Kempson
- George Kemp-Welch (1929–1931) : G. D. Kemp-Welch
- Michael Kendall (1971–1972) : M. P. Kendall
- Gus Kennedy (2010–2012) : A. D. J. Kennedy
- Charles Kenny (1952) : C. J. M. Kenny
- Roy Kerslake (1962–1964) : R. C. Kerslake
- Bharat Khanna (1937) : B. C. Khanna
- Leslie Kidd (1910–1920) : E. L. Kidd
- Edward Kidman (1897) : E. A. Kidman
- Tom Killick (1927–1930) : E. T. Killick
- Frank King (1934–1935) : F. King
- George King (1843) : G. W. King
- Robert King (1846–1849) : R. T. King
- Samuel Kingdon (1826–1827) : S. N. Kingdon
- Fred Kingston (1878) : F. W. Kingston
- David Kirby (1959–1961) : D. Kirby
- Frederick Kirkman (1870) : F. Kirkman
- Michael Kirkman (1963) : M. Kirkman
- Edward Kirwan (1834–1837) : E. D. G. M. Kirwan
- John Kirwan (1836–1842) : J. H. Kirwan
- Henry Knatchbull (1837) : H. E. Knatchbull
- Cecil Knatchbull-Hugessen, 4th Baron Brabourne (1884–1886) : C. M. Knatchbull-Hugessen
- Joseph Knight (1921) : J. W. Knight
- Philip Knight (1854) : P. H. Knight
- Roger Knight (1967–1970) : R. D. V. Knight
- Richard Knight (1912) : R. Knight
- William Knightley-Smith (1953–1955) : W. Knightley-Smith
- Benjamin Koe (1838) : B. D. Koe
- Myron Kok (1953) : M. Kok
- Vikram Kumar (2001–2003) : V. H. Kumar

== L ==
- Francis Lacey (1880–1882) : F. E. Lacey
- David Lacy-Scott (1940–1946) : D. G. Lacy-Scott
- Reginald Lagden (1912–1914) : R. B. Lagden
- Reginald Lambert (1903–1904) : R. E. Lambert
- Oswald Lancashire (1878–1881) : O. P. Lancashire
- William Lane (1866–1867) : W. W. C. Lane
- Arthur Lang (1911–1913) : A. H. Lang
- Robert Lang (1860–1862) : R. Lang
- John Langley (1938–1939) : J. D. A. Langley
- Percy Latham (1892–1894) : P. H. Latham
- Thomas Latham (1873–1874) : T. Latham
- Anthony Lawrence (1932–1933) : A. S. Lawrence
- Antony Lea (1983–1986) : A. E. Lea
- Herbert Leaf (1876) : H. Leaf
- William Leake (1851–1854) : W. M. Leake
- Albert Leatham (1885) : A. E. Leatham
- Frederick Lee (1860–1862) : F. Lee
- John Lee (1845–1849) : J. M. Lee
- Ronald Lee (1899) : R. O. Lee
- Geoffrey Lees (1947) : G. W. Lees
- John Lees (1881–1882) : J. Lees
- Vernon Leese (1892) : V. F. Leese
- Logie Leggatt (1914) : L. C. Leggatt
- James Leith (1846–1849) : J. Leith
- Joshua Leppard (1993) : J. Leppard
- Thomas Leventhorpe (1835) : T. W. Leventhorpe
- Anthony Lewis (1952–1953) : A. C. W. Lewis
- Tony Lewis (1960–1962) : A. R. Lewis
- Keith Lewis (1952–1953) : L. K. Lewis
- Simon Lewis (1998–2000) : S. J. W. Lewis
- Tinsley Lindley (1885–1888) : T. Lindley
- Derek Lister (1953–1954) : D. J. Lister
- Lionel Lister (1933) : W. H. L. Lister
- David Littlewood (1976–1978) : D. J. Littlewood
- Edward Lloyd (1866–1868) : E. W. M. Lloyd
- John Bruce Lockhart (1909–1911) : J. H. B. Lockhart
- Rab Bruce Lockhart (1937–1938) : R. B. B. Lockhart
- Jonathon Lodwick (2012) : J. A. Lodwick
- Kevin Loney (1974) : J. K. Loney
- Frederick Long (1836–1840) : F. E. Long
- Richard Penruddocke Long (1845–1846) : R. P. Long
- Robert Longden (1837) : R. K. Longden
- Tom Longfield (1927–1928) : T. C. Longfield
- George Longman (1872–1875) : G. H. Longman
- Henry Longman (1901) : H. K. Longman
- Bunty Longrigg (1926–1928) : E. F. Longrigg
- Tim Lord (1985–1986) : T. M. Lord
- Greg Loveridge (1998–1999) : G. R. Loveridge
- Jonathan Lowe (1998–2000) : J. P. Lowe
- Richard Lowe (1925–1927) : R. G. H. Lowe
- William Lowe (1895–1896) : W. W. Lowe
- Mark Lowrey (1990–1991) : M. J. Lowrey
- Tom Lowry (1921–1924) : T. C. Lowry
- Colin Loxton (1935) : C. C. Loxton
- A. P. Lucas (1875–1878) : A. P. Lucas
- Charles Lucas (1908) : C. E. Lucas
- Frederick Lucas (1881–1882) : F. M. Lucas
- Henry Luddington (1876–1877) : H. T. Luddington
- Vincent Lumsden (1953–1956) : V. R. Lumsden
- Charles Luxton (1881–1882) : C. H. Luxton
- Dar Lyon (1920–1922) : M. D. Lyon
- Walter Lyon (1861–1863) : W. J. Lyon
- Russell Lyons (1991) : R. J. Lyons
- Alfred Lyttelton (1876–1879) : A. Lyttelton
- Charles Frederick Lyttelton (1907–1909) : C. F. Lyttelton
- Charles Lyttelton, 8th Viscount Cobham (1861–1864) : C. G. Lyttelton
- Edward Lyttelton (1875–1878) : E. Lyttelton
- George Lyttelton, 4th Baron Lyttelton (1836–1838) : G. W. Lyttelton
- George William Spencer Lyttelton (1866–1868) : G. W. S. Lyttelton

== M ==
- George Macan (1872–1875) : G. Macan
- Jack MacBryan (1919–1920) : J. C. W. MacBryan
- Thomas MacDonald (1930) : T. J. MacDonald
- Raphael MacGinty (1952) : R. J. A. MacGinty
- Gregor MacGregor (1888–1891) : G. MacGregor
- Reginald Machin (1926–1927) : R. S. Machin
- Robert Mackenzie (1907–1908) : R. T. H. Mackenzie
- William MacKenzie (1927) : W. F. MacKenzie
- Francis MacKinnon (1869–1870) : F. A. MacKinnon
- James MacKinnon (1886–1888) : J. C. MacKinnon
- William Mackworth (1845) : W. A. Mackworth
- Scott MacLennan (2007–2009) : S. K. MacLennan
- Kenneth MacLeod (1908–1909) : K. G. MacLeod
- David MacVicar (1977) : A. D. L. MacVicar
- Sir Christopher Magnay, 3rd Baronet (1904–1907) : C. B. W. Magnay
- Claude Magnay (1841) : C. S. Magnay
- Humphrey Mainprice (1905–1906) : H. Mainprice
- Majid Khan (1970–1972) : Majid Khan
- Joseph Makinson (1856–1858) : J. Makinson
- Vijaya Malalasekera (1966–1968) : V. P. Malalasekera
- Jack Malden (1921) : W. J. Malden
- Arthur Malkin (1826) : A. T. Malkin
- Herbert Malkin (1858) : H. C. Malkin
- Eric Mann (1902–1905) : E. W. Mann
- George Mann (1938–1939) : F. G. Mann
- Frank Mann (1908–1911) : F. T. Mann
- Ian Mann (1927) : I. R. Mann
- James Mann (1924) : J. E. F. Mann
- John Pelham Mann (1939) : J. P. Mann
- Robin Mann (1993–1994) : R. D. Mann
- Richard Mann (2003–2005) : R. J. Mann
- John Manners-Sutton (1832–1836) : J. H. T. Manners-Sutton
- James Mansfield (1883–1884) : J. W. Mansfield
- William Maples (1839) : W. Maples
- Frank Marchant (1884–1887) : F. Marchant
- Robin Marlar (1951–1953) : R. G. Marlar
- Roderick Marlow (1973) : C. R. J. Marlow
- Charles Marriott (1920–1921) : C. S. Marriott
- Harold Marriott (1895–1898) : H. H. Marriott
- Keith Marsden (1952) : K. Marsden
- Frederick Marsh (1904) : J. F. Marsh
- James Marsh (1901–1903) : J. W. Marsh
- Paul Marsh (1965) : P. J. Marsh
- Herbert Marshall (1861–1864) : H. M. Marshall
- John Marshall (1837) : J. A. B. Marshall
- John Marshall (1859) : J. H. Marshall
- Joseph Marshall (1855–1857) : J. W. Marshall
- Simon Marshall (2002–2004) : S. J. Marshall
- George Marten (1821) : G. R. Marten
- Barry Martin (1971–1973) : B. R. Martin
- Marcus Martin (1862–1864) : M. T. Martin
- Thomas Martin (1928) : T. Martin
- Alfred Martineau (1889) : A. Martineau
- Lionel Martineau (1887–1888) : L. Martineau
- Ian Massey (2006–2007) : I. R. Massey
- William Massey (1837–1839) : W. Massey
- Kenneth Mathews (1951) : K. P. A. Mathews
- Henry Mathwin (1874) : H. Mathwin
- John Maul (1878) : J. B. Maul
- Ward Maule (1853) : W. Maule
- Michael Maw (1933–1934) : M. T. Maw
- Peter May (1950–1952) : P. B. H. May
- Percy May (1903–1906) : P. R. May
- Edmund Maynard (1881–1883) : E. A. J. Maynard
- Keith McAdam (1965–1966) : K. P. W. J. McAdam
- Cuan McCarthy (1952) : C. N. McCarthy
- Samuel McCaughey (1913) : S. McCaughey
- Joseph McCormick (1854–1856) : J. McCormick
- Edmund McCorquodale (1901) : E. G. McCorquodale
- Harold McDonell (1902–1905) : H. C. McDonell
- Guy McDonnell (1984) : G. F. H. McDonnell
- Jamie McDowall (1969–1970) : J. I. McDowall
- Richard McDowell (1999) : R. W. McDowell
- Dan McGrath (2002–2003) : D. E. T. McGrath
- Angus McLachlan (1964–1965) : A. A. McLachlan
- Ian McLachlan (1956–1958) : I. M. McLachlan
- Edward McNiven (1846–1848) : E. McNiven
- Charles McVittie (1929) : C. A. B. McVittie
- Bernard Meakin (1906–1907) : B. Meakin
- Martin Meeson (1957) : M. S. Meeson
- Adolphus Meetkerke (1840) : A. Meetkerke
- Eric Mellin (1907) : E. L. Mellin
- William Mellish (1832) : W. L. Mellish
- Frank Mellor (1874–1877) : F. H. Mellor
- James Mellor (1973) : J. P. Mellor
- Michael Melluish (1954–1956) : M. E. L. Melluish
- William Meryweather (1829) : W. S. T. M. Meryweather
- Jack Meyer (1924–1926) : R. J. O. Meyer
- William Meyrick (1828–1832) : W. Meyrick
- Frederic Meyrick-Jones (1887–1888) : F. M. Meyrick-Jones
- Frederick Micklethwait (1836–1837) : F. N. Micklethwait
- Sotherton Micklethwait (1843) : S. N. Micklethwait
- Mark Middleton (1987–1988) : M. R. Middleton
- Piers Millar (1993) : P. M. C. Millar
- Martin Miller (1963) : M. E. Miller
- Roger Miller (1881) : R. Miller
- William Milligan (1928) : W. L. Milligan
- Michael Mills (1946–1948) : J. M. Mills
- Peter Mills (1979–1982) : J. P. C. Mills
- William Mills (1840–1843) : W. Mills
- Dermot Milman (1932–1933) : D. L. K. Milman
- Marcus Milner (1884) : M. H. Milner
- John Minney (1959–1961) : J. H. Minney
- George Mirehouse (1884–1886) : G. T. Mirehouse
- Norman Mischler (1940–1947) : N. M. Mischler
- Frank Mitchell (1894–1898) : F. Mitchell
- Ian Mitchell (1949) : I. N. Mitchell
- Alex Moen (2019–2020) : A. J. Moen
- Gavin Moffat (1996) : G. R. Moffat
- Stuart Moffat (2002) : J. S. D. Moffat
- Philip Moffat (1998) : P. J. Moffat
- Tom Moffatt (1969) : N. T. Moffatt
- Charles Moline (1886) : C. H. Moline
- Walter Money (1868–1871) : W. B. Money
- Henry Montgomery (1867–1869) : H. H. Montgomery
- Leonard Moon (1897–1900) : L. J. Moon
- Frederick Moore (1896) : F. J. S. Moore
- Nigel Moore (1952) : N. H. Moore
- Alfred Morcom (1905–1907) : A. F. Morcom
- Sir Henry Mordaunt, 12th Baronet (1888–1889) : H. J. Mordaunt
- Trevil Morgan (1927–1930) : J. T. Morgan
- Michael Morgan (1951–1954) : M. N. Morgan
- Guy Morgan (1927–1929) : W. G. Morgan
- Charles Morris (1960) : C. A. Morris
- Harold Morris (1919) : H. M. Morris
- John Morris (1902) : J. F. Morris
- Michael Morris (1989–1991) : M. J. Morris
- Robert Morris (1949–1951) : R. J. Morris
- John Stanton Fleming Morrison (1912–1920) : J. S. F. Morrison
- Charles Morse (1842–1844) : C. Morse
- Arthur Morton (1855) : A. H. A. Morton
- Malcolm Morton (1931) : M. J. H. Morton
- Philip Morton (1877–1880) : P. H. Morton
- Geoffrey Moses (1974) : G. H. Moses
- Tim Moses (2017) : T. H. Moses
- Stuart Mosey (1959) : S. D. H. Mosey
- John Moultrie (1820) : J. Moultrie
- Howard Moxon (1960) : H. Moxon
- James Moyes (2002) : J. R. Moyes junior
- Adrian Moylan (1976–1977) : A. C. D. Moylan
- Aziz Mubarak (1978–1980) : A. M. Mubarak
- Francis Mugliston (1905–1908) : F. H. Mugliston
- Godfrey Mulholland (1912) : G. J. A. M. L. Mulholland
- Sir Henry Mulholland, 1st Baronet (1911–1914) : H. G. H. Mulholland
- Mark Mullins (1989) : M. F. Mullins
- Anthony Murley (1980–1981) : A. J. Murley
- Deryck Murray (1965–1966) : D. L. Murray
- Timothy Murrills (1973–1976) : T. J. Murrills
- Daniel Murty (2018) : D. G. Murty
- John Musgrave (1868) : J. M. Musgrave
- Arthur Thomas Myers (1870–1871) : A. T. Myers

== N ==
- Guy Napier (1904–1907) : G. G. Napier
- John Napier (1881) : J. R. Napier
- John Nason (1909–1910) : J. W. W. Nason
- Charles Naumann (1919) : C. C. Naumann
- John Naumann (1913–1919) : J. H. Naumann
- Robert Nelson (1934–1936) : R. P. Nelson
- Christopher Nevill (1820–1822) : C. Nevill
- Michael Nevin (1969) : M. R. S. Nevin
- William Newcome (1836) : W. C. Newcome
- Anush Newman (2003–2005) : A. R. I. Newman
- Roger Newman (1955–1957) : R. G. Newman
- Stephen Newton (1876) : S. C. Newton
- Christopher Newton Thompson (1939) : C. L. Newton-Thompson
- Frederick Nicholl (1835) : F. I. Nicholl
- John Nichols (1953) : J. B. Nichols
- John Nicholson (1844–1845) : J. Nicholson
- George Nixon (1870) : G. T. S. Nixon
- David Noble (2002–2004) : D. J. Noble
- Charles Norman (1852–1853) : C. L. Norman
- Frederick Norman (1858–1860) : F. H. Norman
- John Norman (1957) : J. W. Norman
- David Norris (1967–1968) : D. W. W. Norris
- William Norris (1851) : W. A. Norris
- Alfred Northey (1858–1860) : A. E. Northey
- Stephen Noyes (1988) : S. J. Noyes
- Frederick Nunn (1859) : F. Nunn

== O ==
- Henry Oakes (1819) : H. J. Oakes
- Robin O'Brien (1954–1956) : R. O'Brien
- Henry Oddie (1834–1836) : H. H. Oddie
- André Odendaal (1980–1983) : A. Odendaal
- Liam O'Driscoll (2006–2008) : W. J. F. O'Driscoll
- Eric Olivier (1908–1909) : E. Olivier
- Denzil Onslow junior (1821–1825) : D. Onslow
- Denzil Roberts Onslow (1859–1861) : D. R. Onslow
- Lewis Orford (1886–1887) : L. A. Orford
- Herbert Orr (1886–1887) : H. R. Orr
- David Osborne (1905) : D. R. Osborne
- Ernest Osborne (1894) : E. C. Osborne
- Donald Oscroft (1929) : D. S. Oscroft
- George Ottey (1844–1847) : G. P. Ottey
- Freddie Owen (2006–2010) : F. G. Owen
- Hugh Owen (1882) : H. G. P. Owen
- Dudley Owen-Thomas (1969–1972) : D. R. Owen-Thomas
- Charles Oxenden (1820–1822) : C. Oxenden
- Graham Oxenden (1822) : G. Oxenden

== P ==
- Michael Packe (1936–1938) : M. S. Packe
- Charles Page (1905–1906) : C. C. Page
- Julian Page (1974–1976) : J. T. Page
- Anthony Palfreman (1966–1968) : A. B. Palfreman
- Clayton Palmer (1905–1907) : C. Palmer
- Rodney Palmer (1929) : R. H. Palmer
- Robert Palmer (1981–1983) : R. W. M. Palmer
- Steve Palmer (1987) : S. L. Palmer
- Grahame Parker (1934–1935) : G. W. Parker
- Henry Parker (1839–1841) : H. Parker
- Jamie Parker (2001–2004) : J. W. R. Parker
- Paul Parker (1976–1978) : P. W. G. Parker
- John Parnell (1831) : J. H. Parnell
- Charles Parnther (1832–1835) : C. H. Parnther
- Cecil Parry (1889) : C. W. Parry
- Donald Parry (1931–1932) : D. M. Parry
- Brian Parsons (1954–1955) : A. B. D. Parsons
- Norman Partridge (1920) : N. E. Partridge
- Avish Patel (2015–2016) : A. R. Patel
- Gajan Pathmanathan (1983) : G. Pathmanathan
- William Patterson (1874–1877) : W. S. Patterson
- Charles Patteson (1912) : C. Patteson
- Richard Paull (1967) : R. K. Paull
- John Pawle (1935–1937) : J. H. Pawle
- Alan Payne (1925) : A. U. Payne
- Charles Payne (1848) : C. R. Payne
- John Payne (1880) : J. H. Payne
- Meyrick Payne (1904–1907) : M. W. Payne
- Wilfred Payton (1937) : W. E. G. Payton
- Hugh Pearman (1969) : H. Pearman
- Richard Pearsall (1947–1948) : R. D. Pearsall
- Tony Pearson (1961–1963) : A. J. G. Pearson
- Ed Pearson (2009) : E. G. Pearson
- Richard Pearson (1991–1993) : R. M. Pearson
- David Peck (1960) : D. A. Peck
- Ian Peck (1978–1984) : I. G. Peck
- Anthony Pelham (1931–1934) : A. G. Pelham
- Francis Pelham (1864–1867) : F. G. Pelham
- Oliver Pell (1844–1848) : O. C. Pell
- Eric Penn (1898–1902) : E. F. Penn
- John Pepper (1946–1948) : J. Pepper
- Aloysius Pereira (1880) : A. S. Pereira
- Lorenz Pereira (1962–1963) : E. L. Pereira
- Henry Perkins (1854–1856) : H. Perkins
- Thomas Perkins (1893–1894) : T. T. N. Perkins
- Jonathan Perry (1987–1988) : J. N. Perry
- Edward Phillips (1903–1904) : E. S. Phillips
- Edward Pickering (1827–1829) : E. H. Pickering
- William Pickering (1840–1842) : W. P. Pickering
- Ian Pieris (1956–1958) : P. I. Pieris
- Charles Pigg (1877–1879) : C. Pigg
- Herbert Pigg (1877–1878) : H. Pigg
- Charles Pimlott (1999–2000) : C. R. Pimlott
- James Piper (2000) : J. W. S. Piper
- Christopher Pitcher (1992–1994) : C. M. Pitcher
- Henry Plowden (1860–1863) : H. M. Plowden
- Graham Pointer (1987–1990) : G. A. Pointer
- Frederick Poland (1881) : F. W. Poland
- Angus Pollock (1982–1984) : A. J. Pollock
- Alasdair Pollock (2013–2015) : A. W. Pollock
- Mano Ponniah (1967–1969) : C. E. M. Ponniah
- Frederick Ponsonby, 6th Earl of Bessborough (1834–1839) : F. G. B. Ponsonby
- Charles Pontifex (1851–1853) : C. Pontifex
- Charles Pope (1892–1895) : C. G. Pope
- Nigel Popplewell (1977–1979) : N. F. M. Popplewell
- Oliver Popplewell (1949–1951) : O. B. Popplewell
- Alfred Potter (1849) : A. Potter
- Henry Potts (1831) : H. Potts
- Roger Poulet (1968) : R. J. Poulet
- James Poulson (2017) : J. E. Poulson
- Adam Powell (1933–1934) : A. G. Powell
- Ernest Powell (1883–1884) : E. O. Powell
- Frederick Powys (1830–1832) : F. H. Y. Powys
- Walter Powys (1871–1874) : W. N. Powys
- Guy Prendergast (1826) : G. L. Prendergast
- Edward Prest (1850) : E. B. Prest
- Harold Prest (1909–1911) : H. E. W. Prest
- William Prest (1851) : W. P. Prest
- Benjamin Preston (1869–1870) : B. Preston
- John Pretlove (1954–1956) : J. F. Pretlove
- David Price (1984–1987) : D. G. Price
- Frederic Price (1873–1874) : F. W. S. Price
- Roger Prideaux (1958–1960) : R. M. Prideaux
- Derek Pringle (1979–1982) : D. R. Pringle
- Graham Pritchard (1962–1964) : G. C. Pritchard
- Tom Probert (2006–2013) : T. J. W. Probert
- William Prosser (1893) : W. H. Prosser
- Barry Pryer (1948–1949) : B. J. K. Pryer
- Charles Pryor (1839) : C. S. Pryor
- Chris Pyemont (1967) : C. P. Pyemont
- James Pyemont (1998–2001) : J. P. Pyemont
- Edward Pye-Smith (1922) : E. J. Pye-Smith
- Richard Pyman (1988–1991) : R. A. Pyman

== Q ==
- David Quinney (1971) : D. H. Quinney

== R ==
- Robert Radcliffe (1819): R. B. Radcliffe
- Reimell Ragnauth (1994–1996): R. T. Ragnauth
- Paul Ramage (1962–1963): P. F. Ramage
- Robert Ramsay (1881–1882): R. C. Ramsay
- Wilfrid Ramsbotham (1908–1909): W. H. Ramsbotham
- Ranjitsinhji (1893–1894): K. S. Ranjitsinhji
- Alan Ratcliffe (1930–1932): A. Ratcliffe
- John Ratledge (1994–1997): J. Ratledge
- Cyril Rattigan (1906–1907): C. S. Rattigan
- David Raw (1967–1968): G. D. Raw
- Philip Ray (1826–1827): P. W. Ray
- Henry Raymond-Barker (1841–1844): H. B. Raymond-Barker
- George Raynor (1872–1873): G. S. Raynor
- Santosh Reddy (1959–1961): N. S. K. Reddy
- William Rees-Davies (1936–1938): W. R. Rees-Davies
- Clive Reunert (1908): C. Reunert
- John Reunert (1908): J. Reunert
- Edward Reynolds (1853–1855): E. M. Reynolds
- Jack Richards (1939): J. L. Richards
- Alfred Richardson (1895–1897): A. G. Richardson
- Henry Richardson (1866–1869): H. A. Richardson
- John Maunsell Richardson (1866–1868): J. M. Richardson
- Philip Richardson (1984): P. C. Richardson
- Percy Richardson (1912): P. J. Richardson
- William Richardson (1882): W. P. Richardson
- Victor Riddell (1926): V. H. H. Riddell
- John Riley (1955–1956): J. C. W. Riley
- William Riley (1912–1914): W. N. Riley
- Anthony Rimell (1949–1950): A. G. J. Rimell
- Stephen Rippinghall (1845): S. F. Rippinghall
- Francis Roberts (1903–1904): F. B. Roberts
- Ouvry Roberts (1925): O. L. Roberts
- Simon Roberts (1947–1949): S. N. Roberts
- George André Robertson (1950): G. A. Robertson
- William Robertson (1899–1901): W. P. Robertson
- Glen Robins (1947): G. L. Robins
- Walter Robins (1926–1928): R. W. V. Robins
- Cyril Robinson (1895–1896): C. D. Robinson
- Jethro Robinson (1936): J. F. Robinson
- John Robinson (1894): J. J. Robinson
- Sandford Robinson (1888): J. S. Robinson
- Claude Rock (1884–1886): C. W. Rock
- Charles Rocke (1822): C. A. Rocke
- Bill Roe (1880–1883): W. N. Roe
- Paul Roebuck (1983–1985): P. G. P. Roebuck
- Peter Roebuck (1975–1977): P. M. Roebuck
- Thomas Rolph (1860): T. L. Rolph
- Edward Romilly (1825–1827): E. Romilly
- Rupert Roopnaraine (1964–1966): R. Roopnaraine
- Edward Rose (1958–1960): E. M. Rose
- Michael Rose (1962–1964): M. H. Rose
- Arthur Ross (1889): A. A. S. L. Ross
- Jonathan Ross (1998–2000): J. S. Ross
- Nigel Ross (1905): N. D. C. Ross
- Nicholas Ross (1969–1970): N. P. G. Ross
- Gerard Rotherham (1919–1920): G. A. Rotherham
- Victor Rothschild, 3rd Baron Rothschild (1930): N. M. V. Rothschild
- Desmond Rought-Rought (1934–1937): D. C. Rought-Rought
- Rodney Rought-Rought (1930–1932): R. C. Rought-Rought
- James Roundell (1973): J. Roundell
- Alfred Rowe (1859): A. W. Rowe
- Francis Rowe (1880–1881): F. C. C. Rowe
- William Rowell (1888–1891): W. I. Rowell
- Viscount Royston (1856–1857): Viscount Royston
- John Ruane (1938–1939): J. D. Ruane
- Charles Rudd (1894): C. J. L. Rudd
- Charles Russell (1836): C. W. C. Russell
- David Russell (1974–1975): D. P. Russell
- Stephen Russell (1965–1967): S. G. Russell
- Neil Russom (1979–1981): N. Russom
- John Rutherford (1957–1958): J. R. F. Rutherford
- Allan Rutter (1953): A. E. H. Rutter

== S ==
- Paddy Sadler (2011–2014) : P. T. Sadler
- Rohan Sajdeh (1999) : R. K. Sajdeh
- Rory Sale (2017) : R. A. Sale
- Herbert Salter (1861–1862) : H. W. Salter
- Ian Sanders (1984) : I. E. W. Sanders
- Thomas Sanders (1828–1832) : T. Sanders
- John Montagu, 7th Earl of Sandwich (1831–1832) : Earl of Sandwich
- Philip Sankey (1848) : P. M. Sankey
- Sabdharatnajyoti Saravanamuttu (1923) : S. Saravanamuttu
- Christopher Saunders (1962–1963) : C. J. Saunders
- Arthur Savile (1839–1840) : A. Savile
- George Savile (1867–1868) : G. Savile
- Tom Savill (2003–2006) : T. E. Savill
- Stanley Saville (1911–1914) : S. H. Saville
- Christopher Sayers (1999–2001) : C. A. Sayers
- Edward Sayres (1838–1841) : E. Sayres
- Prakash Schaffter (1997–1998) : P. A. Schaffter
- Sandford Schultz (1876–1877) : S. S. Schultz
- Alastair Scott (1985–1988) : A. M. G. Scott
- Avison Scott (1868–1871) : A. T. Scott
- George Arbuthnot Scott (1900–1901) : G. A. Scott
- James Scott (2001) : J. B. Scott
- William Martin Scott (1891–1892) : W. M. Scott
- Frederick Seabrook (1926–1928) : F. J. Seabrook
- Christopher Seager (1971) : C. P. Seager
- Edward Seale (1832–1835) : E. T. Seale
- Alex Sears (2014) : A. D. Sears
- Geoffrey Seaton (1946–1947) : G. S. Seaton
- Richard Seddon (1846–1847) : R. Seddon
- Mike Selvey (1971) : M. W. W. Selvey
- Ananya Sen (2009–2010) : A. Sen
- Nipuna Senaratne (2012–2017) : N. V. S. Senaratne
- Frederick Sewell (1901–1902) : F. A. S. Sewell
- Edward Seymour (1819) : E. J. Seymour
- George Seymour (1836–1838) : G. A. Seymour
- Adrian Shankar (2002–2005) : A. Shankar
- John Sharp (1939) : J. A. T. Sharp
- Charles Sharpe (1875) : C. M. Sharpe
- Vero Shaw (1875–1876) : V. K. Shaw
- Samir Sheikh (1999–2000) : S. M. Sheikh
- George Shelmerdine (1920–1922) : G. O. Shelmerdine
- David Sheppard (1950–1952) : D. S. Sheppard
- Patrick Sherrard (1938) : P. Sherrard
- Noel Sherwell (1923–1925) : N. B. Sherwell
- Eustace Shine (1895–1897) : E. B. Shine
- William Shirley (1924) : W. R. D. Shirley
- Alan Shirreff (1939) : A. C. Shirreff
- Bob Short (1969–1970) : R. L. Short
- David Shufflebotham (1989–1990) : D. H. Shufflebotham
- Guy Shuttleworth (1946–1948) : G. M. Shuttleworth
- Shah Siddiqi (1984–1985) : S. N. Siddiqi
- Dennis Silk (1952–1955) : D. R. W. Silk
- Samuel Silkin, Baron Silkin of Dulwich (1938) : S. C. Silkin
- Alex Simcox (1999–2002) : A. D. Simcox
- Arthur Simmonds (1871) : A. Simmonds
- Henry Simonds (1849–1850) : H. J. Simonds
- George Simpson-Hayward (1895–1897) : G. H. T. Simpson-Hayward
- Herbert Sims (1873–1875) : H. M. Sims
- Rudi Singh (2003–2005) : A. Singh
- Anurag Singh (1996–1998) : A. Singh
- Bhalindra Singh (1939) : Bhalindra Singh
- Kanwar Singh (1901) : K. S. Singh
- Nigel Sinker (1966–1967) : N. D. Sinker
- Edward Sivewright (1829) : E. Sivewright
- Alan Skinner (1934) : A. F. Skinner
- John Slack (1954) : J. K. E. Slack
- Ernest Slocock (1886) : E. F. Slocock
- Michael Smethers (1967) : M. C. Smethers
- Arthur Smith (1875) : A. F. Smith
- Benjamin Smith (2006–2007) : B. D. Smith
- Berkeley Smith (1855) : B. Smith
- C. Aubrey Smith (1882–1885) : C. A. Smith
- Colin Stansfield Smith (1954–1957) : C. S. Smith
- Donald Smith (1955–1957) : D. J. Smith
- Ed Smith (1996–1998) : E. T. Smith
- Martin Smith (1961) : M. G. M. Smith
- Percy Smith (1825–1826) : P. Smith
- Smith (1825–1826) : Smith
- Smith (1831) : Smith
- Richard Smyth (1973–1975) : R. I. Smyth
- David Smythe (1911–1912) : D. Smythe
- Henry Snow (1836) : H. J. Snow
- William Snowden (1972–1975) : W. Snowden
- Henry Glanville Southwell (1852–1853) : H. G. Southwell
- John Spencer (1970–1972) : J. Spencer
- Ralph Spencer (1881–1882) : R. Spencer
- Norman Spicer (1901) : N. Spicer
- Douglas Spiro (1883–1885) : D. G. Spiro
- Samuel Squire (1900) : S. G. Squire
- Edward St John (1829) : E. St John
- Francis Stacey (1850–1855) : F. E. Stacey
- Donald Stanley (1994–1995) : D. E. Stanley
- John Stanning senior (1899–1901) : J. Stanning senior
- Harry Stedman (1871) : H. C. P. Stedman
- A. G. Steel (1878–1881) : A. G. Steel
- Douglas Steel (1876–1879) : D. Q. Steel
- Keith Steele (1970–1972) : H. K. C. Steele
- Jonathan Stenner (1988) : J. M. C. Stenner
- Norman Stephen (1887) : N. K. Stephen
- Mike Stevenson (1949–1952) : M. H. Stevenson
- Thomas Stevenson (1822) : T. Stevenson
- Edward Stocks (1875–1876) : E. W. Stocks
- Edgar Stogdon (1893) : E. Stogdon
- John Stogdon (1896–1899) : J. H. Stogdon
- William Stone (1859) : W. H. Stone
- Montague Stow (1867–1869) : M. H. Stow
- Arthur Straker (1913) : A. C. Straker
- Robert Stratton (1945–1946) : R. A. Stratton
- Edward Champion Streatfeild (1890–1893) : E. C. Streatfeild
- Granville Streatfeild (1925) : G. G. C. Streatfeild
- Henry Strutt, 2nd Baron Belper (1860–1862) : H. Strutt
- Charles Studd (1880–1883) : C. T. Studd
- George Studd (1879–1882) : G. B. Studd
- Kynaston Studd (1881–1884) : J. E. K. Studd
- Peter Malden Studd (1936–1939) : P. M. Studd
- Reginald Studd (1895) : R. A. Studd
- Raman Subba Row (1951–1953) : R. Subba Row
- Arnold Sullivan (1899–1900) : A. M. Sullivan
- Joseph Sullivan (1912) : J. H. B. Sullivan
- Karthik Suresh (2018–2019) : K. Suresh
- Desmond Surfleet (1931–1932) : D. F. Surfleet
- David Surridge (1979) : D. Surridge
- Fred Susskind (1910–1912) : M. J. Susskind
- Ian Sutherland (1949) : I. Sutherland
- Arthur Sutthery (1886–1887) : A. M. Sutthery
- Swaranjit Singh (1954–1956) : Swaranjit Singh
- Brian Swift (1957) : B. T. Swift
- William Sykes (1844–1847) : W. Sykes
- Henry Symes-Thompson (1894–1895) : H. E. Symes-Thompson

== T ==
- Arthur Tabor (1872–1874) : A. S. Tabor
- Noel Tagart (1899–1900) : N. O. Tagart
- Charles Taylor (1836–1839) : C. G. Taylor
- Chilton Taylor (1971–1973) : C. R. V. Taylor
- Henry Taylor (1897) (1897) : H. B. J. Taylor
- Henry Taylor (1968) (1968–1969) : H. J. C. Taylor
- John Taylor (1844) : J. M. Taylor
- Michael Taylor (2008–2014) : M. H. Taylor
- Nick Taylor (2019–2020) : N. P. Taylor
- Tom Taylor (1897–1900) : T. L. Taylor
- Reginald Tebbs (1929) : R. K. Tebbs
- Charles Templeton (1827) : C. H. Templeton
- Robert Tennent (1996) : R. W. Tennent
- Frederick Thackeray (1837–1843) : F. Thackeray
- George Thackeray (1826) : G. Thackeray
- Arthur Thomas (1837–1838) : A. Thomas
- Freeman Freeman-Thomas, 1st Marquess of Willingdon (1886–1889) : F. Thomas
- Neill Thomas (1984) : N. P. Thomas
- Bill Thomas (1948) : W. O. Thomas
- John Thompson (1938–1940) : J. R. Thompson
- Thompson (1827–1836) : Thompson
- Richard Thomson (1961–1962) : R. H. Thomson
- Edward Thornewill (1856–1857) : E. J. Thornewill
- Charles Thornhill (1837–1840) : C. Thornhill
- George Thornhill (1831–1837) : G. Thornhill
- Charles Thornton (1869–1872) : C. I. Thornton
- Percy Thornton (1864) : P. M. Thornton
- Guy Thwaites (1991–1992) : G. E. Thwaites
- Ian Thwaites (1963–1964) : I. G. Thwaites
- Patrick Tice (2015–2017) : P. J. A. Tice
- Charles Tillard (1871–1874) : C. Tillard
- Richard Timms (2005–2012) : R. T. Timms
- Wilfrid Timms (1922–1925) : W. W. Timms
- Mark Tindall (1935–1937) : M. Tindall
- Edward Titley (1932) : E. G. Titley
- Frederic Tobin (1870–1872) : Frederic Tobin
- Mortimer Tollemache (1891–1893) : M. G. Tollemache
- Arthur Tomblin (1857) : A. C. Tomblin
- Henry Tomkinson (1851) : H. R. Tomkinson
- William Tomlinson (1922–1923) : W. J. V. Tomlinson
- Chris Tongue (1963) : C. H. Tongue
- Harry Topham (1883–1884) : H. G. Topham
- Charles Toppin (1885–1887) : C. Toppin
- Gerry Tordoff (1952) : G. G. Tordoff
- Harold Torkington (1981) : H. F. Torkington
- Gordon Tovey (1933) : G. C. Tovey
- Thomas Townley (1846–1848) : T. M. Townley
- Barry Trapnell (1943–1946) : B. M. W. Trapnell
- Timothy Travers (1982–1984) : T. J. Travers
- Michael Tremellen (1986–1988) : J. M. Tremellen
- Thomas Tremlett (1853–1854) : T. D. Tremlett
- Walter Trevelyan (1842–1843) : W. B. Trevelyan
- Arthur Trollope (1856–1857) : A. B. Trollope
- Charles Trouncer (1887–1888) : C. A. Trouncer
- George Tuck (1863–1866) : G. H. Tuck
- Thomas Tucker (1822) : T. H. Tucker
- Roland Tudor (1913) : R. G. Tudor
- Neville Tufnell (1908–1920) : N. C. Tufnell
- Maurice Turnbull (1926–1929) : M. J. L. Turnbull
- John Turner (1883–1886) : J. A. Turner
- John Turner (1841) : J. B. Turner
- Robert Turner (1988–1991) : R. J. Turner
- Richard Turner (1953–1954) : R. V. Turner
- Samuel Turner (2018–2019) : S. A. Turner
- Thomas Tweed (1925–1926) : T. E. Tweed
- Bill Tyrwhitt-Drake (1946–1948) : T. W. Tyrwhitt-Drake

== U ==
- John Urquhart (1948) : J. R. Urquhart

== V ==
- Bryan Valentine (1928–1929) : B. H. Valentine
- Carl van Geyzel (1924) : C. T. van Geyzel
- David Varey (1981–1983) : D. W. Varey
- Richard Vaughan (1928) : R. T. Vaughan
- Thomas Verghese (1987) : T. M. Verghese
- Henry Vernon (1850–1852) : H. Vernon
- Niel Viljoen (1991) : J. N. Viljoen
- Harold Vincent (1914) : H. G. Vincent
- James Vitali (2019–2020) : J. C. Vitali

== W ==
- Jack Wagener (1927) : J. G. Wagener
- Alex Waghorn (2016) : A. C. Waghorn
- Owen Wait (1949–1952) : O. J. Wait
- James Walford (1860) : J. H. Walford
- Alfred Walker (1846–1848) : A. Walker
- Ashley Walker (1864–1866) : Ashley Walker
- Edward Walker (1838) : E. Walker
- Frederic Walker (1849–1856) : F. Walker
- John Walker (1846–1856) : John Walker
- Kenneth Walker (1999) : K. D. M. Walker
- George Wallace (1876) : G. H. Wallace
- Richard Waller (1991) : R. B. Waller
- Richard Walmesley (1836) : R. Walmesley
- Arthur Ward (1852–1854) : A. R. Ward
- Edward Ward (1868–1871) : E. E. Ward
- Glen Ward (2007) : G. B. Ward
- John Ward (1954) : J. D. Ward
- Townsend Warner (1862) : G. T. Warner
- William Warner (1865–1868) : W. S. O. Warner
- John Warr (1949–1952) : J. J. Warr
- Charles Warren (1864–1866) : C. Warren
- Arthur Watson (1888) : A. L. Watson
- Arthur Watson (1858) : A. Watson
- James Watson (1957–1959) : J. M. Watson
- Riley Watson (1882) : J. R. Watson
- Thomas Watson (1903) : T. H. Watson
- Hugh Watts (1941–1947) : H. E. Watts
- Robert Webb (1826–1827) : R. H. Webb
- Jack Webster (1938–1940) : J. Webster
- Patrick Webster (1929) : P. G. Webster
- William Webster (1930–1933) : W. H. Webster
- Mark Weedon (1961–1962) : M. J. H. Weedon
- Gerry Weigall (1891–1892) : G. J. V. Weigall
- William Weighell (1866–1869) : W. B. Weighell
- James Welldon (1868–1869) : J. T. Welldon
- Cyril Wells (1891–1893) : C. M. Wells
- Clifford Wells (1894) : C. Wells
- Thomas Wells (1950–1952) : T. U. Wells
- John Weston (1851–1854) : J. S. Weston
- Nathan Wetherell (1828–1831) : N. Wetherell
- Ossie Wheatley (1956–1958) : O. S. Wheatley
- Alan Wheelhouse (1958–1959) : A. Wheelhouse
- Mark Whitaker (1965–1967) : M. R. Whitaker
- Robert Whitby (1950) : R. L. Whitby
- Allan White (1936–1937) : A. F. T. White
- Jim White (1922–1924) : A. H. E. White
- Colin White (1958–1960) : C. D. White
- Herbert White (1851–1852) : H. S. White
- Jack White (1913–1914) : J. White
- Ray White (1962–1965) : R. C. White
- Michael White (1937) : W. M. E. White
- William White (1948) : W. N. White
- Peter Whiteside (1955) : P. G. Whiteside
- Herbert Whitfeld (1878–1881) : H. Whitfeld
- Andy Whittall (1993–1996) : A. R. Whittall
- Nicholas Whittington (2008) : N. M. H. Whittington
- Frederick Whymper (1849–1852) : F. H. Whymper
- Robert Wiggs (1970) : R. J. Wiggs
- Marcus Wight (1992) : R. M. Wight
- Denys Wilcox (1931–1933) : D. R. Wilcox
- John Wilcox (1961–1962) : J. W. T. Wilcox
- John Wild (1938) : J. V. Wild
- Wilde (1859) : Wilde
- Boris Wilenkin (1956) : B. C. G. Wilenkin
- Charles Wilkin (1969–1970) : C. L. A. Wilkin
- Edward Wilkins (1858–1859) : E. J. P. Wilkins
- Charles Wilkinson (1833–1835) : C. A. Wilkinson
- Edward Wilkinson (1873) : E. O. H. Wilkinson
- Kenneth Wilkinson (1927) : K. Wilkinson
- Robert Wilkinson (1831) : R. H. Wilkinson
- John Willan (1819) : J. J. Willan
- Michael Willard (1959–1961) : M. J. L. Willard
- Guy Willatt (1938–1947) : G. L. Willatt
- Jonathan Willatt (1989) : J. M. G. Willatt
- George Willes (1865–1866) : G. E. Willes
- Mark Williams (1976) : C. M. B. Williams
- Williams (1820) : Williams
- Charles Willock (1883) : C. J. Willock
- Arnold Wills (1929) : A. C. L. Wills
- Tom Wills (1856) : T. W. Wills
- Clem Wilson (1895–1900) : C. E. M. Wilson
- Charles Plumpton Wilson (1880–1881) : C. P. Wilson
- David Wilson (1938–1939) : D. C. Wilson
- Rockley Wilson (1899–1902) : E. R. Wilson
- Frederic Wilson (1902–1904) : F. B. Wilson
- Geoffrey Wilson (1919–1920) : G. Wilson
- Rowland Wilson (1888–1889) : R. A. Wilson
- Robin Wilson (1964) : R. J. Wilson
- Thomas Wilson (1869–1871) : T. W. Wilson
- George Winder (1871) : G. A. Winder
- Nick Winder (2017–2018) N.J. Winder
- Anthony Windows (1962–1964) : A. R. Windows
- Archer Windsor-Clive (1910–1912) : A. Windsor-Clive
- William Wingfield (1855–1857) : W. Wingfield
- Roger Winlaw (1932–1934) : R. D. K. Winlaw
- Arthur Winter (1864–1867) : A. H. Winter
- Cecil Winter (1901–1902) : C. E. Winter
- Gerald Winter (1898–1902) : G. E. Winter
- Stephen Winthrop (1829) : S. Winthrop
- Philip Wisson (1958) : P. W. Wisson
- Denys Witherington (1939) : D. M. Witherington
- George Wood (1913–1920) : G. E. C. Wood
- Hugh Wood (1878–1879) : H. Wood
- Dave Woodhead (1968) : D. L. Woodhead
- Frank Woodhead (1889) : F. E. Woodhead
- Kenneth Woodroffe (1913–1914) : K. H. C. Woodroffe
- Basil Woods (1951) : B. J. P. Woods
- Sammy Woods (1888–1891) : S. M. J. Woods
- Stephen Wookey (1975–1976) : S. M. Wookey
- Simon Woolfries (1972) : S. A. Woolfries
- Wilf Wooller (1935–1936) : W. Wooller
- Kenneth Woolley (1947) : K. M. Woolley
- Max Woosnam (1912) : M. Woosnam
- T. C. Worsley (1928) : T. C. Worsley
- Charles Worthington (1898) : C. R. Worthington
- Cyril Wright (1907–1909) : C. C. G. Wright
- Charles Wright (1882–1885) : C. W. Wright
- Oswald Wright (1899) : O. W. Wright
- Philip Wright (1922–1924) : P. A. Wright
- Stephen Wright (1973–1974) : S. Wright
- Wright (1840) : Wright
- Henry Wroth (1844–1846) : H. T. Wroth
- Warwick Reed Wroth (1848) : W. R. Wroth
- Norman Wykes (1926–1928) : N. G. Wykes
- Ben Wylie (2013–2015) : B. A. Wylie
- George Wyndham (1820–1821) : G. Wyndham

== Y ==
- Norman Yardley (1935–1938) : N. W. D. Yardley
- William Yardley (1869–1872) : W. Yardley
- Joseph Yates (1866) : J. M. Yates
- Kenneth Yates (1961) : K. C. Yates
- Michael Yeabsley (1995) : M. I. Yeabsley
- Goodwin Young (1873) : G. Young
- Dick Young (1905–1908) : R. A. Young

== Bibliography ==
- Birley, Derek (1999). A Social History of English Cricket. London: Aurum Press. ISBN 978-18-54107-10-7 – via Internet Archive.
- Carlaw, Derek (2020). Kent County Cricketers, A to Z: Part One (1806–1914) (PDF). Cardiff: ACS.
- Lewis, Paul (2014). For Kent and Country. Eastbourne: Reveille Press. ISBN 978-19-08336-63-7.
