= Robin Mann =

Robin Mann may refer to:

- Robin Mann (musician) (born 1949), Australian Christian singer and songwriter
- Robin Mann (cricketer) (born 1973), English cricketer
- Robin Mann (scientist), honorary D.Sc., University of Canterbury 2010
