= Neil Crawford (cricketer) =

English cricketer (born 1958)

Personal information
- Born: 26 November 1958 (age 67); Leeds, Yorkshire
- Source: Cricinfo, 28 April 2017

Neil Crawford (born 26 November 1958) is an English cricketer. He played 22 first-class matches for Cambridge University Cricket Club between 1978 and 1980.

== See also ==
- List of Cambridge University Cricket Club players
