= Timothy Coghlan (cricketer) =

English cricketer

Personal information
- Born: 29 March 1939; Chelsea, London
- Died: 8 February 2004 (aged 64); London
- Source: Cricinfo, 17 April 2017

Timothy Coghlan (29 March 1939 – 8 February 2004) was an English cricketer. He played twenty first-class matches for Cambridge University Cricket Club between 1958 and 1961.

== See also ==
- List of Cambridge University Cricket Club players
