= Herbert Benbow =

English cricketer

Personal information
- Born: 4 October 1861; Hillingdon, Middlesex
- Died: 2 February 1941 (aged 79); Brampton, Cumberland
- Source: Cricinfo, 9 April 2017

Herbert Benbow (4 October 1861 – 2 February 1941) was an English cricketer. He played two first-class matches for Cambridge University Cricket Club in 1881.

== See also ==
- List of Cambridge University Cricket Club players
