= Michael Abington =

English cricketer (born 1965)

Personal information
- Born: 8 March 1965 (age 61); Lusaka, Zambia
- Source: Cricinfo, 1 April 2017

Michael Abington (born 8 March 1965) is an English first-class cricketer. He played in seven first-class matches for Cambridge University Cricket Club in 1992.

== See also ==
- List of Cambridge University Cricket Club players
