= Walter Coles (cricketer) =

English cricketer (1928–2023)

Personal information
- Born: 11 February 1928; Northwood, Middlesex, England
- Died: 25 July 2023 (aged 95)
- Source: Cricinfo, 18 April 2017

Walter Neill Coles (11 February 1928 – 25 July 2023) was an English cricketer. He played two first-class matches for Cambridge University Cricket Club in 1949. Coles died at home on 25 July 2023, at the age of 95.

== See also ==
- List of Cambridge University Cricket Club players
