= Robert Crawford (Cambridge University cricketer) =

English cricketer

Personal information
- Born: 1 October 1869; Bedford, Bedfordshire
- Died: 27 February 1917 (aged 47); Weston-super-Mare, Somerset
- Source: Cricinfo, 28 April 2017

Robert Crawford (1 October 1869 – 27 February 1917) was an English cricketer. He played one first-class match for Cambridge University Cricket Club in 1891.

== See also ==
- List of Cambridge University Cricket Club players
