= Michael Bishop (cricketer) =

English cricketer (born 1952)

Personal information
- Born: 20 October 1952 (age 74); Marlborough, Wiltshire
- Source: Cricinfo, 9 April 2017

Michael Bishop (born 20 October 1952) is an English cricketer. He played three first-class matches for Cambridge University Cricket Club between 1976 and 1978.

== See also ==
- List of Cambridge University Cricket Club players
