= Richard Bate (cricketer) =

English cricketer (born 1966)

Personal information
- Born: 27 December 1966 (age 59); Finchley, Middlesex
- Source: Cricinfo, 8 April 2017

Richard Bate (born 27 December 1966) is an English cricketer. He played eleven first-class matches for Cambridge University Cricket Club between 1987 and 1989.

== See also ==
- List of Cambridge University Cricket Club players
