= Martin Breddy =

English cricketer (born 1961)

Personal information
- Born: 23 September 1961 (age 65); Torquay, Devon
- Source: Cricinfo, 10 April 2017

Martin Breddy (born 23 September 1961) is an English cricketer. He played ten first-class matches for Cambridge University Cricket Club in 1984.

== See also ==
- List of Cambridge University Cricket Club players
