= Peter Bodkin =

English cricketer (1924–1994)

Personal information
- Born: 15 September 1924; Barnet, Hertfordshire
- Died: 18 September 1994 (aged 70); Ampfield, Hampshire
- Source: Cricinfo, 10 April 2017

Peter Bodkin (15 September 1924 – 18 September 1994) was an English cricketer. He played nine first-class matches for Cambridge University Cricket Club in 1946.

== See also ==
- List of Cambridge University Cricket Club players
