= Philip Cobbold =

English cricketer

Personal information
- Born: 5 January 1875; Ipswich, Suffolk
- Died: 28 December 1945 (aged 70); Ipswich, Suffolk
- Source: Cricinfo, 17 April 2017

Philip Wyndham Cobbold (5 January 1875 – 28 December 1945) was an English cricketer. He played eighteen first-class matches for Cambridge University Cricket Club between 1896 and 1922.

== See also ==
- List of Cambridge University Cricket Club players
