= Matthew Baines (cricketer) =

English cricketer

Personal information
- Born: 19 September 1863; East Molesey, Surrey
- Died: 6 May 1925 (aged 61); Beckley, Sussex
- Source: Cricinfo, 8 April 2017

Matthew Baines (19 September 1863 – 6 May 1925) was an English cricketer. He used right-handed bat and played eight first-class matches for Cambridge University Cricket Club between 1883 and 1890.

== See also ==
- List of Cambridge University Cricket Club players
