= David Browne (cricketer) =

English cricketer (born 1964)

Personal information
- Born: 4 April 1964 (age 62); Stamford, Lincolnshire, England
- Source: Cricinfo, 11 April 2017

David William Browne (born 4 April 1964) is an English cricketer. He played eight first-class matches for Cambridge University Cricket Club between 1985 and 1986, including the 1986 University Match in which he scored the winning runs.

He was educated at Stamford School and St Catharine's College, Cambridge.

== See also ==
- List of Cambridge University Cricket Club players
