= Michael Barford =

English cricketer (born 1950)

Personal information
- Born: 7 June 1950 (age 76); Eastbourne, Sussex
- Source: Cricinfo, 8 April 2017

Michael Barford (born 7 June 1950) is an English cricketer. He played fifteen first-class matches for Cambridge University Cricket Club between 1970 and 1971. He scored 109 on his first-class debut for the university in the second innings against MCC at Fenner's on 5 July 1969. The match was subsequently downgraded. His next first-class opportunity was against Leicestershire, at Fenner's on 6 June 1970.

Mike also won blues for Hockey and was Treasurer of the Quidnuncs Cricket Club for many years.

== See also ==
- List of Cambridge University Cricket Club players
