= John Cockburn-Hood =

English cricketer

Personal information
- Born: 16 January 1844; Sydney, Australia
- Died: 30 August 1902 (aged 58); Catterick Bridge, Yorkshire, England
- Source: Cricinfo, 17 April 2017

John Cockburn-Hood (16 January 1844 – 30 August 1902) was an English cricketer. He played nineteen first-class matches for Cambridge University Cricket Club between 1864 and 1869.

== See also ==
- List of Cambridge University Cricket Club players
