= Fergus Baker =

English cricketer (born 1987)

Personal information
- Born: 18 May 1987 (age 39); Leicester, England
- Source: Cricinfo, 1 April 2017

Fergus Baker (born 18 May 1987) is an English cricketer. He played five first-class matches for Cambridge University Cricket Club between 2007 and 2009.

== See also ==
- List of Cambridge University Cricket Club players
