= Michael Carr (cricketer) =

English cricketer (1933–1995)

Personal information
- Born: 24 June 1933; Alexandria, Egypt
- Died: 29 September 1995 (aged 62); Letherington, Suffolk
- Source: Cricinfo, 16 April 2017

Michael Carr (24 June 1933 – 29 September 1995) was an English cricketer. He played one first-class match for Cambridge University Cricket Club in 1953.

== See also ==
- List of Cambridge University Cricket Club players
