= Lionel Clarke (cricketer) =

English cricketer (born 1972)

Personal information
- Born: 11 October 1972 (age 54); Sheffield, Yorkshire
- Source: Cricinfo, 17 April 2017

Lionel Clarke (born 11 October 1972) is an English cricketer. He played two first-class matches for Cambridge University Cricket Club in 1995.

== See also ==
- List of Cambridge University Cricket Club players
