= Eric Conradi =

English cricketer

Personal information
- Born: 25 July 1920; Kensington, London
- Died: 22 August 1972 (aged 52); Droitwich, Worcestershire
- Source: Cricinfo, 18 April 2017

Eric Conradi (25 July 1920 – 22 August 1972) was an English cricketer. He played seven first-class matches for Cambridge University Cricket Club in 1946.

== See also ==
- List of Cambridge University Cricket Club players
