= Kenneth Walker (English cricketer) =

English cricketer (born 1970)

Personal information
- Born: 28 October 1970 (age 54); Grahamstown, Cape Province, South Africa
- Source: Cricinfo, 30 March 2017

Kenneth Walker (born 28 October 1970) is an English former cricketer. He played seven first-class matches for Cambridge University Cricket Club in 1999.

== See also ==
- List of Cambridge University Cricket Club players
