= David Churton =

English cricketer (born 1975)

Personal information
- Born: 29 March 1975 (age 51); Salisbury, Wiltshire
- Source: Cricinfo, 17 April 2017

David Churton (born 29 March 1975) is an English cricketer. He played twenty first-class matches for Cambridge University Cricket Club between 1995 and 1997.

== See also ==
- List of Cambridge University Cricket Club players
