= Peter Cottrell (cricketer) =

English cricketer (born 1957)

Personal information
- Born: 22 May 1957 (age 69); Welling, Kent
- Source: Cricinfo, 28 April 2017

Peter Cottrell (born 22 May 1957) is an English cricketer. He played ten first-class matches for Cambridge University Cricket Club in 1979.

== See also ==
- List of Cambridge University Cricket Club players
