= Richard Crawley (cricketer) =

English cricketer

Personal information
- Born: 22 February 1831; Luton, Bedfordshire
- Died: 27 February 1897 (aged 66); South Kensington, London
- Source: Cricinfo, 28 April 2017

Richard Crawley (22 February 1831 – 27 February 1897) was an English cricketer. He played three first-class matches for Cambridge University Cricket Club between 1852 and 1854.

== See also ==
- List of Cambridge University Cricket Club players
