= Donald Clarke (cricketer) =

English cricketer (1926–2008)

Donald Hugh Clarke
Personal information
- Born: 15 May 1926; Bromborough, Cheshire, England
- Died: 22 April 2008 (aged 81)
- Source: Cricinfo, 17 April 2017

Donald Hugh Clarke (15 May 1926 – 22 April 2008) was an English cricketer. He played two first-class matches for Cambridge University Cricket Club in 1946.

Clarke died on 22 April 2008, at the age of 81.

== See also ==
- List of Cambridge University Cricket Club players
