= James Chervak =

English cricketer (born 1985)

Personal information
- Born: 7 April 1985 (age 41); Harrogate, England
- Source: Cricinfo, 17 April 2017

James Chervak (born 7 April 1985) is an English cricketer. He played two first-class matches for Cambridge University Cricket Club between 2005 and 2006.

== See also ==
- List of Cambridge University Cricket Club players
