= John Asquith =

English cricketer

Personal information
- Full name: John Patrick Kenyon Asquith
- Born: 1 February 1932; Carshalton, Surrey
- Died: 10 September 2009 (aged 77); Taunton, Somerset
- Role: Wicket-keeper

Domestic team information
- Years: Team
- 1953 to 1954: Cambridge University
- Source: Cricinfo, 1 April 2017

John Asquith (1 February 1932 – 10 September 2009) was an English cricketer. He played in five first-class matches for Cambridge University Cricket Club between 1953 and 1954. He was a school teacher. He and his wife Clare had two daughters and a son.

== See also ==
- List of Cambridge University Cricket Club players
