= John Brunton (cricketer) =

English cricketer

Personal information
- Born: 23 July 1869; Benares, North-Western Provinces, British India
- Died: 12 November 1962 (aged 93); Knutsford, Cheshire, England
- Source: ESPNcricinfo, 21 August 2022

John Brunton (23 July 1869 – 12 November 1962) was an English cricketer. He played six first-class matches for Cambridge University Cricket Club in 1894.

== See also ==
- List of Cambridge University Cricket Club players
