= Jeremy Caplan =

English cricketer (born 1941)

Personal information
- Born: 9 October 1941 (age 85); Mysore, India
- Source: ESPNcricinfo, 15 April 2017

Jeremy Caplan (born 9 October 1941) is an English cricketer. He played two first-class matches for Cambridge University Cricket Club in 1962.

== See also ==
- List of Cambridge University Cricket Club players
