= Ian Burnley =

English cricketer (born 1963)

Personal information
- Born: 11 March 1963 (age 63); Darlington, County Durham
- Source: Cricinfo, 11 April 2017

Ian Burnley (born 11 March 1963) is an English cricketer. He played three first-class matches for Cambridge University Cricket Club in 1984.

== See also ==
- List of Cambridge University Cricket Club players
