= Donald Bousfield =

English cricketer

Personal information
- Full name: Donald Greenhill Bousfield
- Born: 9 April 1914; Broxbourne, Hertfordshire
- Died: 13 April 2001 (aged 87)
- Source: Cricinfo, 10 April 2017

Donald Greenhill Bousfield (9 April 1914 – 13 April 2001) was an English educator and cricketer. He taught mathematics as an instructor at Eton College from the 1930s to the 1970s. He played two first-class matches for Cambridge University Cricket Club in 1935.

Bousfield had a brief military career during World War II, serving in various capacities including as an instructor in Gunnery and as a staff member of the British Army in Washington. After the war, he returned to his teaching career at Eton College. His retirement in the 1970s saw him move to Cornwall, where he engaged in occasional teaching, writing, crossword crafting, and verse composition.

== See also ==
- List of Cambridge University Cricket Club players
