= Richard Beresford (cricketer) =

English cricketer

Personal information
- Born: 12 August 1869; Peterborough, Northamptonshire, England
- Died: 12 July 1941 (aged 71); Derby
- Source: Cricinfo, 9 April 2017

Richard Beresford (12 August 1869 – 12 July 1941) was an English cricketer. He played seven first-class matches for Cambridge University Cricket Club between 1889 and 1891.

== See also ==
- List of Cambridge University Cricket Club players
