= Elliot Bath =

English cricketer (born 1992)

Personal information
- Born: 10 February 1992 (age 34); Winchester, Hampshire
- Source: Cricinfo, 9 April 2017

Elliot Bath (born 10 February 1992) is an English cricketer. He played one first-class match for Cambridge University Cricket Club in 2014.

== See also ==
- List of Cambridge University Cricket Club players
