= Robert Carter-Shaw =

English cricketer (born 1941)

Robert Carter Shaw
Personal information
- Born: 21 November 1941 (age 84); Berkhamsted, Hertfordshire
- Source: Cricinfo, 16 April 2017

Robert Carter Shaw (born 21 November 1941) is an English cricketer. He played one first-class match for Cambridge University Cricket Club in 1962.

== See also ==
- List of Cambridge University Cricket Club players
