= Dudley Campbell (cricketer) =

English cricketer

Personal information
- Born: 24 December 1833; Westminster, London
- Died: 24 January 1900 (aged 66); Chiswick House, Middlesex
- Source: Cricinfo, 15 April 2017

Dudley Campbell (24 December 1833 – 24 January 1900) was an English cricketer. He played six first-class matches for Cambridge University Cricket Club between 1853 and 1854.

== See also ==
- List of Cambridge University Cricket Club players
