= Richard Compton-Burnett =

English cricketer (born 1961)

Personal information
- Born: 1 July 1961 (age 65); Windsor, Berkshire
- Source: Cricinfo, 18 April 2017

Richard Compton-Burnett (born 1 July 1961) is an English cricketer. He played one first-class match for Cambridge University Cricket Club in 1981.

== See also ==
- List of Cambridge University Cricket Club players
