= William Barnett (Cambridge University cricketer) =

English cricketer

Personal information
- Born: 26 October 1830; Old Charlton, Kent
- Died: 26 March 1869 (aged 38); Bywell St Andrew, Northumberland
- Source: Cricinfo, 8 April 2017

William Edward Barnett (26 October 1830 – 26 March 1869) was an English banker and cricketer. He played ten first-class matches for Cambridge University Cricket Club between 1849 and 1854.

The son of Robert Barnett of Blackheath, a stockbroker, he was educated at Eton College, and matriculated at Trinity College, Cambridge in 1848. He became a banker with Hodgkin, Barnett, Pease & Co. of Newcastle upon Tyne.

== See also ==
- List of Cambridge University Cricket Club players
