= Matthew Bailey =

English cricketer (born 1977)

Personal information
- Born: 6 October 1977 (age 49); Cambridge, England
- Source: Cricinfo, 8 April 2017

Matthew Bailey (born 6 October 1977) is an English cricketer. He played one first-class match for Cambridge University Cricket Club in 1997.

== See also ==
- List of Cambridge University Cricket Club players
