= Alex Blofield =

English cricketer (born 1991)

Personal information
- Born: 28 October 1991 (age 35); Shrewsbury, Shropshire
- Source: Cricinfo, 10 April 2017

Alex Blofield (born 28 October 1991) is an English cricketer. He played three first-class matches for Cambridge University Cricket Club in 2015.

== See also ==
- List of Cambridge University Cricket Club players
