= Darshan Chohan =

English cricketer (born 1995)

Personal information
- Born: 4 November 1995 (age 31); Singapore
- Source: Cricinfo, 17 April 2017

Darshan Chohan (born 4 November 1995) is an English cricketer. He played four first-class matches for Cambridge University Cricket Club between 2015 and 2018. He captained the University for the 2018 season.

== See also ==
- List of Cambridge University Cricket Club players
