= Richard Bromley (cricketer) =

English cricketer (born 1946)

Personal information
- Born: 23 June 1946 (age 80); Oxted, Surrey
- Source: Cricinfo, 11 April 2017

Richard Bromley (born 23 June 1946) is an English cricketer. He played five first-class matches for Cambridge University Cricket Club in 1970.

== See also ==
- List of Cambridge University Cricket Club players
