= Leslie Bridges =

English cricketer

Personal information
- Born: 14 February 1890; Christchurch, New Zealand
- Died: 6 August 1959 (aged 69); Bercham, Antwerp, Belgium
- Source: Cricinfo, 10 April 2017

Leslie Bridges (14 February 1890 – 6 August 1959) was an English cricketer. He played one first-class match for Cambridge University Cricket Club in 1911.

== See also ==
- List of Cambridge University Cricket Club players
