= James Craib =

English cricketer

Personal information
- Born: 27 November 1917; Kandy, Ceylon
- Died: 19 December 1994 (aged 77); Little Gaddesden, Hertfordshire
- Source: Cricinfo, 28 April 2017

James Craib (27 November 1917 – 19 December 1994) was an English cricketer. He played two first-class matches for Cambridge University Cricket Club in 1937.

== See also ==
- List of Cambridge University Cricket Club players
