= Damien Bush =

English cricketer (born 1968)

Personal information
- Born: 19 May 1968 (age 58); Solihull, Warwickshire
- Source: Cricinfo, 11 April 2017

Damien Bush (born 19 May 1968) is an English cricketer. He played sixteen first-class matches for Cambridge University Cricket Club between 1989 and 1991.

== See also ==
- List of Cambridge University Cricket Club players
