= Mark Mullins (cricketer) =

English cricketer and surgeon

Personal information
- Full name: Mark Francis Mullins
- Born: 15 November 1966 (age 59); Gravesend, Kent, England
- Batting: Right-handed
- Bowling: Right-arm medium

Domestic team information
- Years: Team
- 1989: Cambridge University

Career statistics
Competition	First-class
Matches	6
Runs scored	3
Batting average	1.00
100s/50s	–/–
Top score	3
Balls bowled	768
Wickets	10
Bowling average	43.80
5 wickets in innings	1
10 wickets in match	–
Best bowling	5/77
Catches/stumpings	1/–
- Source: Cricinfo, 15 January 2022

Mark Francis Mullins (born 15 November 1966) is an English surgeon and former first-class cricketer.

Mullins was born at Gravesend in November 1966 and later studied at Homerton College at the University of Cambridge. While studying at Cambridge, he played first-class cricket for Cambridge University Cricket Club in 1989, making six appearances. Playing as a medium pace bowler in the Cambridge side, he took 10 wickets at average of 43.80; half of these wickets came in a single innings against Glamorgan on his first-class debut.

After training at St Mary's Hospital in London, Mullins became a specialist orthopaedic surgeon.
