= Benjamin Preston =

English cricketer and brewer

Benjamin Preston (20 April 1846 – 1 June 1914) was an English brewer and cricketer who played first-class cricket for Cambridge University in 1869 and 1870. He was born and died at Lowestoft, Suffolk.

Preston was educated at Westminster School and at Gonville and Caius College, Cambridge. He was at Cambridge University from 1867 but did not make his first-class cricket debut until 1869, when he opened the innings as a right-handed batsman in four matches. He achieved no great success in 1869, but was picked for the University Match against Oxford University, in which he scored 5 and 0. In 1870, Preston played a further four matches for the university side, not always as an opening batsman, and against the Gentlemen of England team he scored 24 and 28, the two best innings of his first-class career. But he was not picked for the 1870 University Match and he did not play first-class cricket again after this season, although he featured in minor matches for amateur sides, including Suffolk, through to 1885.

Preston returned to Lowestoft after leaving Cambridge University with a Bachelor of Arts degree in 1871; he became a brewer in the town and was also a Justice of the Peace. He was married three times.
