= Raphael MacGinty =

English cricketer (1927–2001)

Personal information
- Full name: Raphael Joseph Anthony MacGinty
- Born: 27 March 1927; Croydon, Surrey, England
- Died: 20 October 2001 (aged 74); Cape Town, South Africa
- Batting: Right-handed
- Bowling: Right-arm off break

Domestic team information
- Years: Team
- 1952: Cambridge University
- 1951–1952: Cambridgeshire

Career statistics
Competition	FC
Matches	6
Runs scored	32
Batting average	4.57
100s/50s	–/–
Top score	18
Balls bowled	1,209
Wickets	17
Bowling average	29.64
5 wickets in innings	–
10 wickets in match	–
Best bowling	4/58
Catches/stumpings	4/–
- Source: Cricinfo, 20 July 2010

Raphael Joseph Anthony MacGinty (27 March 1927 – 20 October 2001) was an English cricketer. MacGinty was a right-handed batsman who bowled right-arm off break. He was born at Croydon, Surrey.

In 1951, MacGinty made his Minor Counties Championship debut for Cambridgeshire against the Northamptonshire Second XI. From 1951 to 1952, he represented the county in 7 Minor Counties matches, with his final appearance coming against Lincolnshire.

MacGinty also played first-class cricket for Cambridge University, making his first-class debut against Leicestershire in 1952. He represented the University in 5 further first-class matches in 1952, with his final appearance coming against Gloucestershire. In his 6 first-class matches, he took 17 wickets at a bowling average of 29.64, with best figures of 4/58.

MacGinty died in Cape Town, South Africa on 20 October 2001, at the age of 74.
