= James Welldon (cricketer) =

English cricketer

James Turner Welldon (3 August 1847 – 6 February 1927) was an English first-class cricketer active 1867 to 1869 who played for Kent and Cambridge University. He was born in Tonbridge; died in Ashford, Kent.

== Bibliography ==
- Carlaw, Derek (2020). Kent County Cricketers, A to Z: Part One (1806–1914) (PDF). Cardiff: ACS.
