= Adrian Moylan =

English cricketer

Personal information
- Full name: Adrian Charles David Moylan
- Born: 26 June 1955 (age 71); Weston-super-Mare, Somerset, England
- Batting: Left-handed
- Bowling: Slow left-arm orthodox

Domestic team information
- Years: Team
- 1976–1977: Cambridge University

Career statistics
| Competition | First-class |
|---|---|
| Matches | 5 |
| Runs scored | 176 |
| Batting average | 19.55 |
| 100s/50s | –/– |
| Top score | 29 |
| Balls bowled | 18 |
| Wickets | 0 |
| Bowling average | – |
| 5 wickets in innings | – |
| 10 wickets in match | – |
| Best bowling | – |
| Catches/stumpings | 1/– |
- Source: Cricinfo, 14 January 2022

Adrian Charles David Moylan (born 26 June 1955) is an English former first-class cricketer.

Moylan was born at Weston-super-Mare in June 1955. He was educated at Clifton College, before going up to Downing College, Cambridge. While studying at Cambridge, he played first-class cricket infrequently for Cambridge University Cricket Club in 1976 and 1977, making five appearances. Playing as an opening batsman, he scored 176 runs in his five matches at an average of 19.55, with a highest score of 29. He additionally played for the Somerset second eleven from 1973 to 1977, but was unable to establish himself in the Somerset first eleven.
