= William Meryweather =

English cricketer

William Stephens Turner Mellish Meryweather (3 January 1809 – 4 May 1841) was an English cricketer who was associated with Cambridge University Cricket Club and made his debut in 1829.

He was educated at Charterhouse and Trinity College, Cambridge. In 1830, while he was at Cambridge, he and his two younger brothers took the surname of Turner in compliance with his grandfather's will, so that he became William Stephens Turner Mellish Turner. He was called to the Bar in 1831.

== Bibliography ==
- Haygarth, Arthur (1996) [1862]. Scores & Biographies, Volume 1 (1744–1826). Kennington: Frederick Lillywhite. ISBN 978-19-00592-23-9.
- Haygarth, Arthur (1997) [1862]. Scores & Biographies, Volume 2 (1827–1840). Kennington: Frederick Lillywhite. ISBN 978-19-00592-23-9.
