= Henry Grazebrook =

English cricketer

Henry Goodwin Grazebrook (24 February 1810 – 17 December 1868) was an English cricketer with amateur status. He was associated with Cambridge University and made his debut in 1828. He was educated at Winchester College and Jesus College, Cambridge. He became a solicitor at Chertsey.

== Bibliography ==
- Haygarth, Arthur (1996) [1862]. Scores & Biographies, Volume 1 (1744–1826). Kennington: Frederick Lillywhite. ISBN 978-19-00592-23-9.
- Haygarth, Arthur (1997) [1862]. Scores & Biographies, Volume 2 (1827–1840). Kennington: Frederick Lillywhite. ISBN 978-19-00592-23-9.
