= Aloysius Pereira =

Indian-born, English-educated tea-planter and cricketer

Aloysius Stanislaus Pereira (30 December 1859 – 11 November 1935) was an India, English-educated tea-planter and a cricketer who played in a single first-class cricket match for Cambridge University in 1880. He was born in Kolkata, then called Calcutta, and died in Dehradun, also in India.

Pereira was educated at Stonyhurst College and at Christ's College, Cambridge. In minor cricket matches, he is recorded as opening the batting or playing in the middle order; he also bowled regularly in them. In his only first-class match, a 12-a-side game for Cambridge University against a strong "England XI", he batted at No 10, scoring 3 and 7 and took one wicket and two catches in the single England innings.

Pereira graduated from Cambridge University with a Bachelor of Arts degree in 1881; he was reported as being a tea-planter in Muzaffarpur in 1912.
