= Alistair Dewhurst =

English cricketer (born 1996)

Personal information
- Full name: Alasdair Charles Dewhurst
- Born: 5 November 1996 (age 30); Hammersmith, London, England
- Batting: Right-handed
- Bowling: Right-arm medium

Domestic team information
- Years: Team
- 2017–2019: Cambridge University

Career statistics
Competition	First-class
Matches	3
Runs scored	207
Batting average	34.50
100s/50s	–/2
Top score	91
Catches/stumpings	1/–
- Source: Cricinfo, 16 January 2022

Alasdair Charles Dewhurst (born 5 November 1996) is an English former first-class cricketer.

Dewhurst was educated at St Paul's School, before going up to Robinson College, Cambridge. While studying at Cambridge, he played first-class cricket for Cambridge University Cricket Club from 2017 to 2019, making three appearances in The University Match. He had some success in these matches, scoring 207 runs at an average of 34.50; he made two half centuries, with scores of 91 and 65 in 2017 and 2018. He was elected captain of the cricket club in 2018.
