= Edward St John (cricketer) =

English cricketer

Edward St John (8 December 1805 – 17 January 1892) was an English cricketer who was associated with Cambridge University Cricket Club and made his debut in 1829.

He was a student at Downing College, Cambridge. After graduating with a LLB degree in 1831 he became a Church of England priest and was rector of Finchampstead from 1841 until his death in 1892.

== Bibliography ==
- Haygarth, Arthur (1996) [1862]. Scores & Biographies, Volume 1 (1744–1826). Kennington: Frederick Lillywhite. ISBN 978-19-00592-23-9.
- Haygarth, Arthur (1997) [1862]. Scores & Biographies, Volume 2 (1827–1840). Kennington: Frederick Lillywhite. ISBN 978-19-00592-23-9.
