= Simon Lewis (cricketer) =

English cricketer

Personal information
- Full name: Simon James Ward Lewis
- Born: 9 October 1978 (age 48); Bolton, Lancashire, England
- Batting: Right-handed

Domestic team information
- Years: Team
- 1998–2000: Cambridge University

Career statistics
Competition	First-class
Matches	11
Runs scored	171
Batting average	10.05
100s/50s	–/–
Top score	26
Catches/stumpings	5/–
- Source: Cricinfo, 31 December 2021

Simon James Ward Lewis (born 9 October 1978) is an English former first-class cricketer.

Lewis was born at Bolton in October 1978. He was educated at Ermysted's Grammar School, before going up to Jesus College, Cambridge. While studying at Cambridge, he played first-class cricket for Cambridge University Cricket Club from 1998 to 2000, making eleven appearances. Playing as a batsman and occasional wicket-keeper in the Cambridge side, Lewis scored 171 runs at an average of 10.05 and a highest score of 26.
