= Mahendra Kasippillai =

Sri Lankan cricketer

Personal information
- Full name: Mahendra Kasippillai
- Born: 21 September 1927; Colombo, Western Province, British Ceylon
- Died: 4 April 1998 (aged 70); Kandy, Central Province, Sri Lanka
- Batting: Left-handed
- Bowling: Slow left-arm orthodox

Domestic team information
- Years: Team
- 1948/49–1951/52: Ceylon
- 1954–1955: Cambridgeshire
- 1956–1957: Cambridge University

Career statistics
Competition	First-class
Matches	11
Runs scored	277
Batting average	14.57
100s/50s	–/1
Top score	62*
Balls bowled	228
Wickets	3
Bowling average	43.33
5 wickets in innings	–
10 wickets in match	–
Best bowling	2/36
Catches/stumpings	4/–
- Source: Cricinfo, 20 July 2019

Mahendra Kasippillai (21 September 1927 – 4 April 1998) was a Sri Lankan first-class cricketer.

Kasippillai was born at Colombo in September 1927, where he was educated at Royal College. He made his debut in first-class cricket for Ceylon against the touring Pakistanis in April 1949, before playing a second first-class match for Ceylon in February 1952 against the touring Marylebone Cricket Club. He later studied in England at Downing College, a constituent college of the University of Cambridge. While studying at Cambridge, he made nine appearances in first-class cricket for Cambridge University in 1956 and 1957. He scored 238 runs in these nine matches, at an average of 15.86 and a high score of 62 not out. While at Cambridge, Kasippillai also played minor counties cricket for Cambridgeshire in 1954 and 1955, making seven appearances in the Minor Counties Championship. He later died at Kandy in April 1998.
