= Stephen Noyes =

English cricketer

Personal information
- Full name: Stephen James Noyes
- Born: 17 September 1963 (age 63); High Wycombe, Buckinghamshire, England
- Batting: Right-handed
- Bowling: Slow left-arm orthodox

Domestic team information
- Years: Team
- 1988: Cambridge University
- 1992: Buckinghamshire

Career statistics
Competition	First-class
Matches	8
Runs scored	170
Batting average	13.07
100s/50s	0/0
Top score	38
Catches/stumpings	0/–
- Source: Cricinfo, 25 May 2011

Stephen James Noyes (born 17 September 1963) is a former English cricketer. Noyes was a right-handed batsman who bowled slow left-arm orthodox. He was born in High Wycombe, Buckinghamshire.

Noyes made his first-class debut for Cambridge University against Derbyshire in 1988. Noyes played 7 further first-class matches that season for the university, the last coming against Surrey. In his 8 first-class matches, he scored 170 runs at a batting average of 13.07, with a high score of 38.

He played 3 Minor Counties Championship matches for Buckinghamshire in 1992, against Northumberland, Cumberland and Cambridgeshire.

He has worked as a French teacher at the Royal Grammar School High Wycombe, as well as being Director of Sixth Form.
