= Richard Seddon (cricketer) =

English cricketer

Richard Seddon (11 February 1825 – 13 July 1884) was an English cricketer who played in first-class cricket matches for Nottinghamshire, Cambridge University and amateur sides between 1845 and 1847. He was born in Leicester and died in Bournemouth (then in Hampshire, but now Dorset).
