= Martin Miller (cricketer, born 1940) =

English cricketer and civil servant

Personal information
- Full name: Martin Ellis Miller
- Born: 15 December 1940; Lytham St Annes, Lancashire, England
- Died: 28 October 2016 (aged 75); Dartford, Kent, England
- Batting: Right-handed
- Bowling: Right-arm off break

Domestic team information
- Years: Team
- 1963: Cambridge University

Career statistics
Competition	First-class
Matches	12
Runs scored	48
Batting average	4.80
100s/50s	–/–
Top score	21*
Balls bowled	2,002
Wickets	33
Bowling average	23.33
5 wickets in innings	2
10 wickets in match	–
Best bowling	6/89
Catches/stumpings	4/–
- Source: Cricinfo, 25 January 2022

Martin Ellis Miller (15 December 1940 — 28 October 2016) was an English first-class cricketer and civil servant.

Miller was born at Lytham St Annes in December 1940 and studied Law at St. John's College at the University of Cambridge. While studying at Cambridge, he played first-class cricket for Cambridge University Cricket Club in 1963, making twelve appearances. Playing as an off break bowler in the Cambridge side, he took 33 wickets at an average of 23.33; he took a five wicket haul on two occasions, with best figures of 6 for 89. These figures came against Middlesex, which guaranteed his place in The University Match against Oxford at Lord's. Wisden described how Miller was able to vary the flight and pace of his off breaks, saying he did so "artfully". It was also noted how he could bowl for unlimited periods. As a lower order batsman, he scored 48 runs with a highest score of 21 not out.

His talents were noticed by Worcestershire, but he turned down their approach over concerns about his eyesight. Miller first worked as a lawyer after graduating from Cambridge and later joined the Civil Service, working in the Ministry of Transport and then the Department of the Environment; however, due to his eyesight failing, he had to retire early. He later developed Parkinson's disease and died in Dartford in October 2016.
