= Frederick Nicholl =

English lawyer and cricketer

Frederick Iltid Nicholl (8 July 1814 – 25 February 1893) was an English lawyer and a cricketer who played cricket for Cambridge University in a match in 1835 that has subsequently been judged to have been first-class. He was born and died in London.

Nicholl was educated at Eton College and Trinity College, Cambridge. Nicholl's record as a cricketer is sketchy. He opened the innings for Cambridge University in a single match against Marylebone Cricket Club in July 1835, failed to score in either innings and is not recorded as bowling; nor, indeed, is there any record of him playing in any further matches, even minor games.

Nicholl graduated from Cambridge University with a Bachelor of Arts degree in 1836 and became a solicitor in London, practising from an address near the Royal Courts of Justice in The Strand.
