= Richard Waller (cricketer) =

English cricketer and barrister

Personal information
- Full name: Richard Beaumont Waller
- Born: 15 November 1969 (age 56); Islington, London, England
- Batting: Right-handed
- Bowling: Right-arm medium-fast

Domestic team information
- Years: Team
- 1991: Cambridge University

Career statistics
Competition	First-class
Matches	5
Runs scored	12
Batting average	12.00
100s/50s	–/–
Top score	6*
Balls bowled	512
Wickets	7
Bowling average	51.85
5 wickets in innings	–
10 wickets in match	–
Best bowling	3/31
Catches/stumpings	1/–
- Source: Cricinfo, 15 January 2022

Richard Beaumont Waller KC (born 5 December 1969) is an English barrister and former first-class cricketer.

He studied at Trinity College at the University of Cambridge, where he played first-class cricket for Cambridge University Cricket Club in 1991, making five appearances. Playing as a medium-fast bowler in the Cambridge side, he took 7 wickets at average of 51.85, with best figures of 3 for 31. A student of Gray's Inn, he was called to the bar in 1994 to practice as a barrister.
