= Samir Sheikh =

English cricketer

Personal information
- Full name: Samir Majid Sheikh
- Born: 16 October 1978 (age 48); Southwark, London, England
- Batting: Right-handed
- Bowling: Right-arm medium-fast

Domestic team information
- Years: Team
- 1999–2000: Cambridge University

Career statistics
Competition	First-class
Matches	6
Runs scored	26
Batting average	13.00
100s/50s	–/–
Top score	17
Balls bowled	713
Wickets	12
Bowling average	36.41
5 wickets in innings	–
10 wickets in match	–
Best bowling	4/25
Catches/stumpings	1/–
- Source: Cricinfo, 25 January 2022

Samir Majid Sheikh (born 16 October 1978) is an English former first-class cricketer.

Sheikh was born at Southwark in October 1978 and matriculated to Newnham College at the University of Cambridge in 1997. While studying at Cambridge, he played first-class cricket for Cambridge University Cricket Club in 1999 and 2000, making six appearances, which included appearing twice in The University Match against Oxford. Playing in the Cambridge side as a right-arm medium-fast bowler, Sheikh took 12 wickets at an average of 36.41, best figures of 4 for 25. As a tailend batsman, he scored 26 runs with a highest score of 17.
