= Shah Siddiqi =

English cricketer and surgeon

Personal information
- Full name: Shah Naweed Siddiqi
- Born: 13 September 1959 (age 67); Islington, London, England
- Batting: Right-handed
- Bowling: Right-arm off break

Domestic team information
- Years: Team
- 1984–1985: Cambridge University

Career statistics
Competition	First-class
Matches	7
Runs scored	219
Batting average	16.84
100s/50s	–/1
Top score	52
Balls bowled	150
Wickets	5
Bowling average	20.40
5 wickets in innings	1
10 wickets in match	–
Best bowling	5/90
Catches/stumpings	1/–
- Source: Cricinfo, 15 January 2022

Shah Naweed Siddiqi (born 13 September 1959) is an English neurosurgeon and former first-class cricketer.

Siddiqi was born at Islington in September 1959. He studied medical sciences and psychology at University College London, before proceeding to Hughes Hall at the University of Cambridge where he obtained his medical degree. While studying at Cambridge, he played first-class cricket for Cambridge University Cricket Club in 1984 and 1985, making seven appearances. Playing as an all-rounder in the Cambridge side, Siddiqi scored 219 runs at an average of 16.84; he made one half century, a score of 52. With his off break bowling, he took five wickets, all of which came in a single innings against Warwickshire at Fenner's in 1984.

His medical career took him to Canada in the 1990s, where he held a neurosurgery residency at University of Toronto, and a fellowship at the Sunnybrook Health Sciences Centre. Siddiqi is currently a neurosurgeon across a number of hospitals in Texas.
