= Fraser Cooke =

English cricketer

Personal information
- Full name: Fraser James Cooke
- Born: 2 April 1972 (age 54); Hall Green, Worcestershire, England
- Batting: Right-handed
- Role: Wicket-keeper

Domestic team information
- Years: Team
- 1994: Cambridge University

Career statistics
Competition	First-class
Matches	9
Runs scored	80
Batting average	13.33
100s/50s	–/–
Top score	34*
Catches/stumpings	9/1
- Source: Cricinfo, 22 September 2020

Fraser James Cooke (born 2 April 1972) is an English former first-class cricketer.

Cooke was born in the Birmingham suburb of Hall Green. He later studied at the University of Cambridge, attending Fitzwilliam College. While studying at Cambridge, Cooke played first-class cricket as a wicket-keeper for Cambridge University in 1994, making nine appearances. One of his nine appearances came in that seasons University Match at Lord's, where he shared in a stand of 66 for the final wicket with Chris Pitcher to help Cambridge recover from 186 for 9 to 253 all out in their first innings. He scored 80 runs in his nine appearances, with a high score of 34 not out in The University Match. As a wicket-keeper, he took 9 catches and made a single stumping.
