= James Roundell =

English cricketer

Personal information
- Full name: James Roundell
- Born: 23 October 1951 (age 75); Nantwich, Cheshire, England
- Batting: Left-handed
- Bowling: Right-arm medium-fast

Domestic team information
- Years: Team
- 1973: Cambridge University

Career statistics
Competition	First-class
Matches	10
Runs scored	36
Batting average	7.20
100s/50s	–/–
Top score	10*
Balls bowled	965
Wickets	9
Bowling average	56.55
5 wickets in innings	–
10 wickets in match	–
Best bowling	3/12
Catches/stumpings	1/–
- Source: Cricinfo, 15 January 2022

James Roundell (born 23 October 1951) is an English former first-class cricketer.

The son of Ann and Charles Roundell, he was born at Nantwich in October 1951. He was educated at Winchester College, before going up to Magdalene College, Cambridge. While studying at Cambridge, he played first-class cricket for Cambridge University Cricket Club in 1973, making ten appearances. Playing as a medium-fast bowler on the Cambridge side, he took 9 wickets at an average of 56.55, with the best figures being 3 for 12. As a tailend batsman, he scored 36 runs with a highest score of 10 not out.
