= Nigel Sinker =

English cricketer

Personal information
- Full name: Nigel Dalcour Sinker
- Born: 19 April 1946 (age 80); Writtle, Essex, England
- Batting: Left-handed
- Bowling: Slow left-arm orthodox

Domestic team information
- Years: Team
- 1966–1967: Cambridge University

Career statistics
Competition	First-class
Matches	13
Runs scored	188
Batting average	9.89
100s/50s	–/–
Top score	31*
Balls bowled	1,793
Wickets	22
Bowling average	32.31
5 wickets in innings	–
10 wickets in match	–
Best bowling	4/10
Catches/stumpings	2/–
- Source: Cricinfo, 1 January 2022

Nigel Dalcour Sinker (born 19 April 1946) is an English former first-class cricketer.

The son of Philip Tennant Sinker and Mary Louisa Pearson, he was born in April 1946 at Writtle, Essex. He was educated at Winchester College, before going up to Jesus College, Cambridge. While studying at Cambridge, he played first-class cricket for Cambridge University Cricket Club in 1966 and 1967, making thirteen appearances. He scored 188 runs in his these matches, at an average of 9.89 and a highest score of 31 not out. With his slow left-arm orthodox bowling, he took 22 wickets at a bowling average of 32.31 and best figures of 4 for 10.
