= Walter Fairbanks =

English cricketer

Personal information
- Born: 13 April 1852; Chatham, Kent
- Died: 25 August 1924 (aged 72); Guildford, Surrey
- Batting: Right-handed

Domestic team information
- Years: Team
- 1875-1884: Gloucestershire
- Source: Cricinfo, 4 April 2014

Walter Fairbanks (13 April 1852 – 25 August 1924) was an English cricketer. He played for Gloucestershire between 1875 and 1884. Fairbanks was educated at Clifton College and Clare College, Cambridge. After graduating he returned to Clifton College and taught there 1875–96.
