= Timothy Edwards (cricketer, born 1958) =

English cricketer and educator

Personal information
- Full name: Timothy David Warneford Edwards
- Born: 6 December 1958 (age 67); Merton, Surrey, England
- Batting: Left-handed
- Bowling: Unknown

Domestic team information
- Years: Team
- 1979–1981: Cambridge University

Career statistics
Competition	First-class
Matches	12
Runs scored	393
Batting average	20.68
100s/50s	–/1
Top score	57
Balls bowled	120
Wickets	1
Bowling average	58.00
5 wickets in innings	–
10 wickets in match	–
Best bowling	1/17
Catches/stumpings	5/–
- Source: Cricinfo, 20 January 2022

Timothy David Warneford Edwards (born 6 December 1958) is an English former first-class cricketer.

Edwards was born at Merton in December 1958. He was educated at Sherborne School, before going up to St Johns College, Cambridge. While studying at Cambridge, he played first-class cricket for Cambridge University Cricket Club between 1979 and 1981, making twelve appearances. Playing in the Cambridge side as a batsman, Edwards scored 393 runs at an average of 20.68; he made one half century, a score of 57 against Nottinghamshire in 1981. As a part-time bowler, his only wicket at first-class level was Sussex's Alan Wells.
