= Michael Kendall =

English cricketer

Personal information
- Full name: Michael Philip Kendall
- Born: 10 November 1949 (age 77); Canterbury, Kent, England
- Batting: Right-handed
- Bowling: Left-arm medium

Domestic team information
- Years: Team
- 1971–1972: Cambridge University

Career statistics
Competition	First-class	List A
Matches	12	4
Runs scored	60	6
Batting average	5.00	6.00
100s/50s	–/–	–/–
Top score	13	2*
Balls bowled	1,656	187
Wickets	23	2
Bowling average	37.04	56.50
5 wickets in innings	1	–
10 wickets in match	–	–
Best bowling	6/43	1/31
Catches/stumpings	2/–	–/–
- Source: Cricinfo, 12 January 2022

Michael Philip Kendall (born 10 November 1949) is an English former first-class cricketer.

Kendall was born at Canterbury in November 1949. He later studied at Jesus College at the University of Cambridge. While studying at Cambridge, he played first-class cricket for Cambridge University Cricket Club in 1971 and 1972, making twelve appearances. Playing as a left-arm medium pace bowler in the Cambridge side, he took 23 wickets at an average of 37.04. He took one five wicket haul, with figures of 6 for 43 against Oxford University at Lord's in The University Match of 1972. As a tailend batsman, he scored 60 runs with a highest score of 13. He also played four List A one-day matches for Cambridge in the 1972 Benson & Hedges Cup, taking 2 wickets across these matches.
