= Henry Denman =

English cricketer

Personal information
- Full name: Henry Wynne Denman
- Born: 5 July 1929; Liverpool, Lancashire, England
- Died: 28 December 2002 (aged 73); Kensington, London, England
- Batting: Right-handed
- Role: Wicket-keeper

Domestic team information
- Years: Team
- 1950–1952: Cambridge University

Career statistics
Competition	First-class
Matches	7
Runs scored	4
Batting average	4.00
100s/50s	–/–
Top score	3
Catches/stumpings	5/2
- Source: Cricinfo, 18 January 2022

Henry Wynne Denman (5 July 1929 – 28 December 2002) was an English first-class cricketer.

Denman was born at Liverpool in July 1929 and later studied at Magdalene College, Cambridge. While studying at Cambridge, he played first-class cricket for Cambridge University Cricket Club from 1950 to 1952, making seven appearances. Playing as a wicket-keeper in the Cambridge side, he took five catches and made two stumpings in this capacity, while as a batsman he scored 4 runs. Denman died at Kensington in December 2002.
