= Arnold Wills =

English cricketer

Arnold Cass Lycett Wills (17 July 1906 – 28 February 1978) was an English cricketer active from 1926 to 1929 who played for Northamptonshire (Northants).

He was born in Pimlico on 17 July 1906 and died in Northampton on 28 February 1978. He appeared in sixteen first-class matches as a righthanded batsman who bowled right arm medium pace. He scored 338 runs with a highest score of 68 and took six wickets with a best performance of three for 68.

During the Second World War he gained the rank of 2nd Lieutenant in the 9th Queen's Royal Lancers and was later a captain and adjutant in 1941 in the 24th Lancers. In July 1941 Capt. A.C.L.Wills was attached to 11 Armoured Div School, Leeds.
