= Samuel Kingdon =

English cricketer (1805–1872)

Samuel Nicholson Kingdon (16 May 1805 – 17 March 1872) was an English cricketer with amateur status. He was associated with Cambridge University and made his debut in 1827.

He was educated at Eton College and at Trinity College, Cambridge. He later became a fellow of Sidney Sussex College, Cambridge and was vicar of Bridgerule, where his father had also been vicar, from 1844 to his death in 1872.

== Bibliography ==
- Haygarth, Arthur (1996) [1862]. Scores & Biographies, Volume 1 (1744–1826). Kennington: Frederick Lillywhite. ISBN 978-19-00592-23-9.
- Haygarth, Arthur (1997) [1862]. Scores & Biographies, Volume 2 (1827–1840). Kennington: Frederick Lillywhite. ISBN 978-19-00592-23-9.
