= Victor Riddell =

English cricketer

Personal information
- Full name: Victor Horsley Hume Riddell
- Born: 23 July 1905; Rotherham
- Died: 9 August 1976 (aged 71); Stratford-upon-Avon, Warwickshire, England
- Batting: Right-handed
- Role: Wicket-keeper

Domestic team information
- Years: Team
- 1926: Cambridge University
- 1924: Devon

Career statistics
Competition	First-class
Matches	5
Runs scored	48
Batting average	8.00
100s/50s	–/–
Top score	13*
Balls bowled	–
Wickets	–
Bowling average	–
5 wickets in innings	–
10 wickets in match	–
Best bowling	–
Catches/stumpings	3/3
- Source: Cricinfo, 17 February 2011

Victor Horsley Hume Riddell FRCS (23 July 1905 – 9 August 1976) was an English cricketer and surgeon.

Riddell was a right-handed batsman who fielded primarily as a wicket-keeper. He was born in Rotherham and was educated at Clifton College and Sidney Sussex College, Cambridge.

Riddell played two Minor Counties Championship matches for Devon in 1924 against the Surrey Second XI and Berkshire. Two years later he made his first-class debut for Cambridge University against Lancashire. He played four further first-class matches in 1926 for the university, the last of which came against Oxford University. In his 5 first-class matches, Riddell scored 48 runs at a batting average of 8.00, with a high score of 13*. Behind the stumps he took three catches and made three stumpings.

He qualified MRCS in general surgery from St George's Hospital, London, in 1930, proceeding to FRCS three years later. He obtained the MD Cambridge in 1938. He was appointed to the honorary staff of the Royal Waterloo Hospital. In 1939 his book on blood transfusion was published, which was regarded as the major British textbook on the subject for ten years. Also in 1939 he was appointed to the staff of St George's as surgeon, an appointment he held until he retired in 1970.

Riddell developed a close interest in the international field and was recognized particularly in Asia as an outstanding surgical ambassador. In 1957 he was the representative of the Royal College of Surgeons on a surgical mission to the USSR and three years later he was the leader of the British Council surgical mission to the Near East, Cyprus, Jordan, Iraq and Iran. He paid two further visits to Asia – as James IV Association of Surgeons' Visitor to India in 1963 and as guest surgeon to New Delhi and Bangkok in 1970.

In Britain his reputation and popularity were exemplified by many invitations to act as an examiner in surgery to the Universities of Birmingham, Cambridge, Leeds and London.

He died at Stratford-upon-Avon, Warwickshire on 9 August 1976.
