= Matt Austin (cricketer) =

English cricketer

Matthew Lorenzo Austin (born 31 January 1985 in Colchester, Essex) is a former first-class cricketer. He studied at Oundle School and Emmanuel College, Cambridge, playing first-class cricket for Cambridge University Cricket Club. He played two first-class matches; the 2006 University Match at The Parks and the 2007 match at Fenner's.
