= Donald Oscroft =

English cricketer

Donald Straker Oscroft (12 April 1908 – 19 February 1944) was an English cricketer active from 1928 to 1934 who played for Leicestershire. He was born in London and died in Aberdeenshire. He appeared in five first-class matches as a righthanded batsman who bowled right arm medium pace. He scored 105 runs with a highest score of 50.
