= Michael Kirkman (cricketer) =

English cricketer

Personal information
- Full name: Michael Kirkman
- Born: 11 February 1942 (age 84); Bodmin, Cornwall, England
- Batting: Right-handed
- Bowling: Leg break

Domestic team information
- Years: Team
- 1963: Cambridge University

Career statistics
Competition	First-class
Matches	10
Runs scored	28
Batting average	7.00
100s/50s	–/–
Top score	7*
Balls bowled	1,416
Wickets	14
Bowling average	52.92
5 wickets in innings	–
10 wickets in match	–
Best bowling	3/32
Catches/stumpings	2/–
- Source: Cricinfo, 16 January 2022

Michael Kirkman (born 11 February 1942) is an English former first-class cricketer.

Kirkman was born at Bodmin in February 1942. He was educated at Dulwich College, before going up to St Catharine's College, Cambridge. While studying at Cambridge, he played first-class cricket for Cambridge University Cricket Club in 1963, making ten appearances. Playing as a leg break bowler in the Cambridge side, he took 14 wickets at an average of 52.92, with best figures of 3 for 32. As a tailend batsman, he scored 28 runs with a highest score of 7 not out.
