= Donald Stanley =

English cricketer

Personal information
- Full name: Donald Eric Stanley
- Born: 8 March 1972 (age 54); Bromley, London, England
- Batting: Right-handed

Domestic team information
- Years: Team
- 1994–1995: Cambridge University

Career statistics
Competition	First-class
Matches	7
Runs scored	101
Batting average	10.10
100s/50s	–/–
Top score	48
Catches/stumpings	2/–
- Source: Cricinfo, 15 January 2022

Donald Eric Stanley (born 8 March 1972) is an English former first-class cricketer.

Stanley was born at Bromley in March 1972. He was educated at Abingdon School, before going up to Caius College, Cambridge. While studying at Cambridge, he played first-class cricket for Cambridge University Cricket Club in 1994 and 1995, making seven appearances. Playing as a middle order batsman in five matches in 1994 and as an opening batsman in two matches in 1995, he scored 101 runs at an average of 10.10; almost half of his career runs came in a single innings, with a score of 48 against Glamorgan in 1994.
