= Robert Palmer (cricketer) =

Hong Kong-born English cricketer

Personal information
- Full name: Robert William Michael Palmer
- Born: 4 June 1960 (age 66); Hong Kong
- Batting: Right-handed
- Bowling: Left-arm medium

Domestic team information
- Years: Team
- 1981–1983: Cambridge University
- 1986: Buckinghamshire

Career statistics
Competition	First-class
Matches	11
Runs scored	20
Batting average	5.00
100s/50s	0/0
Top score	12
Balls bowled	1,432
Wickets	16
Bowling average	59.62
5 wickets in innings	0
10 wickets in match	0
Best bowling	4/96
Catches/stumpings	4/–
- Source: Cricinfo, 26 May 2011

Robert William Michael Palmer (born 4 June 1960) is a Hong Kong born former English cricketer. Palmer was a right-handed batsman who bowled left-arm medium pace.

Palmer made his first-class debut for Cambridge University against Worcestershire in 1981. Palmer played 10 further first-class matches for the university, the last coming against Northamptonshire. In his 11 first-class matches, he took 16 runs at a bowling average of 59.62, with best figures of 4/96.

He played Minor Counties Championship and MCCA Knockout Trophy matches for Buckinghamshire in 1986.
