= Simon Roberts (Cambridge cricketer) =

South African cricketer (1926–2009)

Personal information
- Full name: Simon Nicholas Roberts
- Born: 11 September 1926; Durban, Natal Province, South Africa
- Died: November 2009 (aged 83); Pietermaritzburg, South Africa
- Batting: Right-handed
- Bowling: Leg break

Domestic team information
- Years: Team
- 1947-1949: Cambridge University
- 1947: Cambridgeshire

Career statistics
Competition	FC
Matches	6
Runs scored	158
Batting average	15.80
100s/50s	–/–
Top score	49*
Balls bowled	12
Wickets	–
Bowling average	–
5 wickets in innings	–
10 wickets in match	–
Best bowling	–
Catches/stumpings	–/–
- Source: Cricinfo, 20 July 2010

Simon Nicholas Roberts (11 September 1926 – November 2009) was a South African cricketer. Roberts was a right-handed batsman who was a leg break bowler.

Roberts was born at Durban, Natal Province. In 1947, Roberts made a single Minor Counties Championship appearance for Cambridgeshire against Lincolnshire.

Roberts also played first-class cricket for Cambridge University against Middlesex, making his debut in 1947. From 1947 to 1949, he represented the university in 6 first-class matches, with his final appearance coming against Middlesex. In his 6 first-class matches, he scored 158 runs at a batting average of 15.80, with a high score of 49*.

Simon Roberts died in Pietermaritzburg in November 2009, at the age of 83.
