= Robert Howell (cricketer) =

English cricketer

Personal information
- Full name: Robert George Dunnett Howell
- Born: 23 January 1877; Edmonton, Middlesex, England
- Died: 27 September 1942 (aged 65); Sydenham, London, England
- Batting: Unknown

Domestic team information
- Years: Team
- 1900: Sussex
- 1898–1899: Cambridge University

Career statistics
Competition	First-class
Matches	3
Runs scored	14
Batting average	2.80
100s/50s	–/–
Top score	7
Balls bowled	–
Wickets	–
Bowling average	–
5 wickets in innings	–
10 wickets in match	–
Best bowling	–
Catches/stumpings	–/–
- Source: Cricinfo, 7 October 2012

Robert George Dunnett Howell (23 January 1877 – 27 September 1942) was an English cricketer. Howell's batting style is unknown. He was born at Edmonton, Middlesex.

While undertaking studies at Emmanuel College, Cambridge, Howell made his first-class debut for Cambridge University against Hampshire at Fenner's in 1898. He made a second first-class appearance for the university in the following season against the Marylebone Cricket Club at Fenner's. In 1900, he made a single first-class appearance for Sussex against Cambridge University at the County Ground, Hove. Howell had little success in his three first-class appearances, scoring a total of 14 runs.

He died at Sydenham, London, on 27 September 1942.
