= Robin Mann (cricketer) =

English cricketer

Personal information
- Full name: Robin David Mann
- Born: 31 October 1973 (age 53); Middlesbrough, Yorkshire, England
- Batting: Right-handed

Domestic team information
- Years: Team
- 1994: Cambridge University

Career statistics
Competition	First-class
Matches	9
Runs scored	248
Batting average	15.50
100s/50s	–/1
Top score	53
Catches/stumpings	2/–
- Source: Cricinfo, 20 January 2022

Robin David Mann (born 31 October 1973) is an English former first-class cricketer.

Mann was born at Middlesbrough in October 1973 and later studied at the University of Cambridge. While studying at Cambridge, he played first-class cricket for Cambridge University Cricket Club in 1994, making nine appearances. Playing as an opening and middle order batsman in the Cambridge side, he scored 248 runs at an average of 15.50; he made one score of over fifty, making 53 runs against Worcestershire.
