= Walter Money =

English clergyman & cricketer (1848–1924)

The Reverend Walter Baptist Money (27 July 1848 – 1 March 1924) was an English clergyman and cricketer who played first-class cricket for Cambridge University, Kent, Surrey, the Gentlemen and several other amateur teams between 1867 and 1871. He was born at Sternfield, Suffolk and died at Edgbaston, Birmingham.

Money was educated at Harrow School and at Trinity College, Cambridge. As a cricketer, Money was a right-handed middle-order batsman and a slow left-arm bowler. He was in the first team at Harrow for three seasons from 1865 to 1867 and "was perhaps even more famous at school for his lob bowling than for his batting". He played first-class cricket as an 18-year-old for the Gentlemen of Kent against the Marylebone Cricket Club in a 12-a-side match in 1866 and took five wickets in the first MCC innings and top-scored with 36 when the Kent team batted. The following season he played a single first-class match for the Kent County Cricket Club.

From 1868 to 1871 he was at Cambridge University and he played in the University Match against Oxford University in all four seasons, captaining the team in 1870. Money's personal contribution to this game was not great, but it was a sensational game, known widely as "Cobden's Match" on account of the feat of the Cambridge bowler Frank Cobden, who, with Oxford requiring three runs to win, took the last three wickets in three balls, a hat-trick, to win the match for Cambridge. Money had had his own personal triumph in the University Match of the previous year, 1869, when his bowling figures of six for 24 and five for 35 were instrumental in another Cambridge victory. Those were the best bowling figures of his first-class career, but though his bowling fell away in 1870 his batting developed and he scored the only two centuries of his career in that season. The higher was an innings of 134 against Surrey, for whom he had played in a couple of games in the 1869 season. A more prominent innings was his unbeaten 109, following a first-innings top score of 70, for the Gentlemen in the Gentlemen v Players match at The Oval; W. G. Grace, just nine days older than Money, made 215 in the same second innings. Where Grace went on in first-class cricket for a further 38 years, however, Money played only four further matches, three of them for Cambridge University in 1871; the University Match that year was his last first-class game and he was twice a victim of Samuel Butler, who took all 10 wickets in Cambridge's first innings and 15 in the match.

Money left Cambridge with a Bachelor of Arts degree in 1871 and was ordained as a clergyman in the Church of England, serving first as a curate at Bakewell, Derbyshire and then at Drigg with Irton in Cumberland. From 1875 he was curate and then, from 1882, rector at Weybridge, Surrey, but he retired from there in 1902 and was later living in Birmingham. In 1920, he produced a book, Humours of a Parish, and other Quaintnesses, from his clerical experiences.

== Bibliography ==
- Carlaw, Derek (2020). Kent County Cricketers, A to Z: Part One (1806–1914) (PDF). Cardiff: ACS.
