= George Jeffery =

George Jeffery may refer to:

- George Jeffery (cricketer) (1853–1891), English cricketer
- George Jeffery (politician) (1920–1989), Australian politician
- George Barker Jeffery (1891–1957), mathematical physicist
- George Henry Everett Jeffery (1855–1935), British antiquarian, curator, and historian
- George Jeffery (rugby union) (1861–1937), English rugby union player, see List of England national rugby union players

== See also ==
- George Jeffrey (1916–1979), Scottish footballer
- George Jeffreys (disambiguation)
