= Tom Elliott (cricketer, born 1991) =

English cricketer

Personal information
- Full name: Tom Christopher Elliott
- Born: 21 November 1991 (age 34); Epsom, Surrey, England
- Batting: Right-handed
- Bowling: Right-arm medium

Domestic team information
- Years: Team
- 2012–2014: Cambridge MCCU
- 2012–2014: Cambridge University

Career statistics
Competition	First-class
Matches	8
Runs scored	306
Batting average	23.53
100s/50s	1/–
Top score	101
Catches/stumpings	4/–
- Source: Cricinfo, 16 August 2020

Tom Christopher Elliott (born 21 November 1991) is an English former first-class cricketer.

Elliott was born at Epsom in November 1991. He was educated at Tonbridge School, before going up to Sidney Sussex College, Cambridge. While studying at Cambridge, he played first-class cricket for both Cambridge University and Cambridge MCCU from 2012 to 2014. (Note: Cambridge MCCU differed from Cambridge University Cricket Club in that it was open to students at Anglia Ruskin University, whereas Cambridge University Cricket Club is exclusively for students of the constituent colleges of the University of Cambridge.) He made five appearances for Cambridge MCCU and three appearances for Cambridge University in The University Match against Oxford. He scored 306 runs in his eight appearances at an average of 23.53. He made one century, making 101 against Oxford in the 2013 University Match, with his score the second highest in the match after Oxford's Sam Agarwal made 313. Elliott fared better against Oxford than the county opponents he faced playing for Cambridge MCCU. In addition to playing cricket for Cambridge, he was also the university rackets captain, for which he gained a blue.
