= Finham Park 2 =

Academy in Coventry, West Midlands, England

Location
- Torrington Avenue; Coventry, West Midlands, CV4 9WT; 52°23′50″N 1°34′22″W

Information
- School type: Free school
- Established: 1 September 2015
- Sister school: Finham Park School
- Trust: Finham Park Multi-Academy Trust
- Department for Education URN: 141939 Tables
- Ofsted: Reports
- Head teacher: Will Keddie
- Executive headteacher: Mark Bailie
- Staff: 65
- Gender: Coeducational
- Age range: 11-18
- Houses: Northgate; Eastgate; Southgate; Westgate
- Website: http://finhampark2.co.uk

Finham Park 2 is a secondary school and sixth form located on Torrington Avenue in Tile Hill, Coventry. It was founded on 1 September 2015 as a sequel school to the already existing Finham Park School, a secondary school and sixth form situated on Green Lane in Finham. In the ten years since its creation, the school has amassed 665 pupils, which is close to the original intended capacity of 800. The school's age range is 11-18, as alike Finham Park School, it has two optional years of sixth form past its five mandatory years of secondary schooling. The headteacher is Will Keddie and the school has around 75 staff.

== History ==
The school was established on 1 September 2015 as a non-selective, comprehensive state school for students aged 11–18. Upon the school's establishment, it was considered to be controversial and by some to be a "waste of money", or that it would have a "negative impact on existing schools", with over 400 people signing a petition against the school's establishment. In September 2021, Coventry Telegraph stated that Finham Park 2 was the most oversubscribed school in Coventry, with 54% of those who put Finham Park 2 as their first choice when applying for secondary securing a place.

On 7 May 2023, Headteacher Russell Plester died from sudden death of unknown cause. Masses of floral tributes were thereupon laid at the school site, Russell having been described as an immensely kind, passionate man and amazing Headteacher.

Finham Park School was said to be the basis of Finham Park 2, with the ultimate aim being to be "world class" and be rated 'Outstanding' by Ofsted. However, in the last and only Ofsted inspection for the school on 6 June 2018, the school was rated as 'Good'.

The school has become a member of the Finham Park Multi-Academy Trust and the Lion Alliance. The school has also established a college system, with all students split into 4 colleges, being Northgate, Southgate, Westgate and Eastgate, resembling Finham Park School's former college system.

== Sixth Form ==
Alike Finham Park School, Finham Park 2 also has a sixth form, offering A-Level courses in the subjects of Biology, Business Studies, Chemistry, Engineering, English Literature, Fine Art, Geography, History, Maths, Spanish and more. The sixth form currently has a capacity of 200, split into the year groups of Year 12 and Year 13, with each having a capacity of 100 respectively. For admissions, students must achieve at least a grade 5–9 in GCSE English and three other GCSE subjects. Most sixth form lessons take place in the main school area.

== Ofsted ==
The recent inspection was that the school would be rated as 'Good'. In the report, it was stated: "In a small number of lessons, pupils’ attitudes to learning are not as good as they are in others. During the inspection, some incidents of low-level disruptive behaviour occurred. Pupils confirmed that this does happen occasionally, and they also said that some staff do not issue sanctions in accordance with the behaviour policy."

== Colleges ==
The school has 4 colleges:

College	Colour
Northgate	Blue
Eastgate	Red
Southgate	Yellow
Westgate	Green
