= Tom Williams (cricketer) =

English cricketer (born 1994)

Personal information
- Full name: Thomas James Williams
- Born: 4 May 1994 (age 32); Epsom, Surrey, England
- Batting: Right-handed
- Bowling: Right-arm medium-fast

Domestic team information
- Years: Team
- 2013–2014: Oxford University

Career statistics
Competition	First-class
Matches	2
Runs scored	38
Batting average	38.00
100s/50s	–/–
Top score	29
Balls bowled	331
Wickets	11
Bowling average	12.90
5 wickets in innings	1
10 wickets in match	–
Best bowling	5/34
Catches/stumpings	–/–
- Source: Cricinfo, 16 April 2020

Thomas James Williams (born 4 May 1994) is an Englishman who played cricket and hockey for Oxford University.

== Early life and career ==
Williams was born at Epsom in May 1994. He was educated at Epsom College, where he father was deputy headteacher. From Epsom, he went up to read chemistry at Balliol College, Oxford. While studying at Oxford, he made two appearances in first-class cricket for Oxford University against Cambridge University in The University Matches of 2013 and 2014. In the 2013 fixture, he took a five wicket haul to help Oxford to victory by an innings and 186 runs, with Oxford's Sam Agarwal scoring a University Match record 313. He was the first Old Epsomian to earn a cricket blue in over thirty years. In addition to playing cricket for Oxford, he also represented the university at field hockey.
