= Daniel King (academic) =

Australian classicist and cricketer

Personal information
- Full name: Daniel Alexander King
- Born: 26 February 1983 (age 43); Canberra, Australian Capital Territory
- Height: 5 ft 7 in (1.70 m)
- Batting: Left-handed
- Role: Wicket-keeper

Domestic team information
- Years: Team
- 2009–2010: Oxford University

Career statistics
Competition	First-class
Matches	2
Runs scored	191
Batting average	63.66
100s/50s	1/0
Top score	189
Catches/stumpings	4/–
- Source: Cricinfo, 10 July 2020

Academic background
- Education: Australian National University (BA); University of Exeter (MA); Merton College, Oxford (DPhil)
- Thesis: Painful stories: the experience of pain and its narration in the Greek literature of the Imperial period (100–250) (2011)
- Doctoral advisor: Tim Whitmarsh

Academic work
- Discipline: Classics
- Sub-discipline: Greek culture

Daniel Alexander King (born 26 February 1983) is an Australian academic who lectures in Classics and a former first-class cricketer.

== Academic career ==
King was born in Canberra, and studied Classics at the Australian National University. He completed an MA in Classical Languages and Literature at the University of Exeter, then gained a DPhil at Merton College at the University of Oxford. His doctoral supervisor was Professor Tim Whitmarsh.

Since 2012, King has taught classics at the University of Exeter, initially appointed as Leventis Lecturer in the Impact of Greek Culture. His position was initially funded through a grant from the A. G. Leventis Foundation and has since been made permanent by the university.

In 2019, he gave a public lecture at The Hellenic Centre as part of that year's Leventis Lecture series. His talk was titled, "Doctors' stories: case-histories and narratives of diagnosis in ancient and modern medicine".

King has written and co-edited books in the field of classical studies, including:

- Experiencing Pain in Imperial Greek Culture. Oxford Classical Monographs. Oxford University Press. 2017. ISBN 978-0-19-881051-3.
- Co-edited with Boris Chrubasik: Hellenism and the Local Communities of the Eastern Mediterranean. Oxford University Press. 2017. ISBN 978-0-19-880566-3.
- Co-edited with Jacqueline Clarke and Han Baltussen: Pain narratives in Greco-Roman writings: studies in the representation of physical and mental suffering. Studies in ancient medicine. Brill. 2023. ISBN 978-90-04-67746-3.

== Cricket career ==
While studying at Oxford, King made two appearances in first-class cricket for Oxford University against Cambridge University in the University Matches of 2009 and 2010. In the 2010 fixture, King scored 189 runs opening the batting in the Oxford first innings of 611 for 5 declared, sharing in an opening partnership of 259 in 218 minutes with Sam Agarwal. He then kept wicket through the two Cambridge innings, taking two catches and not conceding a bye as Oxford went on to an innings victory. In his two innings in the 2009 match he had scored just 2 runs.
