= William Stewart (English cricketer) =

English cricketer and cleric

Personal information
- Full name: William Anthony Stewart
- Born: 19 May 1847; Sparsholt, Hampshire, England
- Died: 31 July 1883 (aged 36); Twyford, Hampshire, England
- Batting: Right-handed
- Role: Wicket-keeper
- Relatives: Herbert Stewart (brother); Charles Everett (brother-in-law)

Domestic team information
- Years: Team
- 1869–1870: Oxford University
- 1869–1878: Hampshire

Career statistics
Competition	First-class
Matches	9
Runs scored	46
Batting average	3.83
100s/50s	–/–
Top score	12
Catches/stumpings	15/9
- Source: Cricinfo, 5 February 2010

William Anthony Stewart (19 May 1847 – 31 July 1883) was an English first-class cricketer and clergyman.

The son of the Scottish politician and clergyman Edward Stewart, he was born in May 1847 at Sparsholt, Hampshire. He was the grandson of Edward Richard Stewart and great-grandson of John Stewart, 7th Earl of Galloway. His mother was of Irish extraction, hailing from a County Kerry family. He was educated at Winchester College, before matriculating to Oriel College, Oxford. While studying at Oxford, he played first-class cricket for Oxford University Cricket Club in 1869 and 1870, making seven appearances. In the 1870 University Match, he was the second-to-last batsman to be dismissed in Frank Cobden's famous hat-trick, taken with Oxford requiring just 4 runs to win the match. Playing as a wicket-keeper for Oxford, he took 12 catches and made 8 stumpings. As a batsman, he scored 36 runs with a highest score of 12. He also played first-class cricket for Hampshire against the Marylebone Cricket Club (MCC) at Southampton in 1869. After graduating from Oxford in 1870, Stewart was ordained in the Church of England as a deacon. He was curate at Blagdon in Somerset from 1870 to 1873, after which he was appointed to Ireland as perpetual curate of Muckross in County Kerry. He returned to England in 1880 to take up the post of vicar at West Tisted, Hampshire. He later played a second first-class cricket for Hampshire against the MCC at Lord's in 1878. Stewart died in July 1883 at Twyford, Hampshire. His brother, Herbert, was also a first-class cricketer and a noted British Army officer. His brother-in-law was the Hampshire cricketer Charles Everett.
