= Thomas Balderson =

English cricketer (born 1999)

Tom Balderson
Personal information
- Full name: Thomas William Balderson
- Born: 7 May 1999 (age 27); Stockport, Cheshire, England
- Height: 6 ft 0 in (1.83 m)
- Batting: Right-handed
- Bowling: Slow left-arm orthodox

Domestic team information
- Years: Team
- 2018–2019: Cambridge University

Career statistics
Competition	First-class
Matches	2
Runs scored	20
Batting average	6.66
100s/50s	0/0
Top score	10
Balls bowled	382
Wickets	3
Bowling average	52.00
5 wickets in innings	0
10 wickets in match	0
Best bowling	2/91
Catches/stumpings	0/–
- Source: Cricinfo, 9 September 2020

Thomas William Balderson (born 7 May 1999) is an English former first-class cricketer.

Balderson was born at Stockport in May 1999. He was educated at Cheadle Hulme High School, before going up to Downing College, Cambridge. While studying at Cambridge, he made two appearances in first-class cricket for Cambridge University against Oxford University in The University Matches of 2018 at Oxford and 2019 at Fenner's. He scored 20 runs in his two matches, in addition to taking 3 wickets with his slow left-arm orthodox bowling, including the wicket of centurion George Hargrave in the 2019 fixture.

Also whilst at Cambridge, Balderson won the annual rugby 'Cuppers' competition twice for Downing College (2018/19 and 2019/20).
