= Frank Cobden =

English cricketer (1849–1932)

Personal information
- Full name: Frank Carroll Cobden
- Born: 14 October 1849; Marylebone, London, England
- Died: 7 December 1932 (aged 83); Capel Curig, Caernarvonshire, Wales
- Batting: Right-handed
- Bowling: Right arm fast (roundarm)

Domestic team information
- Years: Team
- 1870–1872: Cambridge University
- 1870–1872: Marylebone Cricket Club

Career statistics
Competition	First-class
Matches	22
Runs scored	471
Batting average	14.27
100s/50s	0/1
Top score	73*
Balls bowled	2,381
Wickets	65
Bowling average	17.20
5 wickets in innings	4
10 wickets in match	1
Best bowling	6/35
Catches/stumpings	9/–
- Source: CricketArchive, 12 July 2008

Frank Carroll Cobden (14 October 1849 – 7 December 1932) was an English cricketer who played for Cambridge University and the Marylebone Cricket Club (MCC). In the University Match of 1870 he famously took a hat-trick comprising the last three Oxford University batsmen when Oxford required only three more runs to win, so that Cambridge University won by two runs a match which they had seemed certain to lose. This feat led to the 1870 match becoming known as "Cobden's Match".

== Early life and education ==
Born on 14 October 1849 at Marylebone, London, Cobden was educated at Brighton College and Harrow before entering Trinity College, Cambridge in 1869. He transferred to Downing College in 1871. In later life he was a Justice of the Peace for Radnorshire.

== Cricket career ==
His first-class career lasted only from 1870 to 1872, for he played no more at first-class level after leaving Cambridge. As well as the university, he also appeared for Marylebone Cricket Club (MCC). He was a right-arm roundarm fast bowler and a right-handed batsman. In 22 matches he took 65 wickets at an average of 17.20, with best innings figures of 6/35. He took five or more wickets in an innings four times and ten or more wickets in a match once. He made 471 runs at an average of 14.27. He passed fifty only once, when he scored 73 not out. According to Wisden he was a "free and powerful hitter".

His brother, Halsted Cobden, also played first-class cricket.

Cobden also played county cricket for Herefordshire, Radnorshire, and, between 1868 and 1890, for Shropshire. For the latter he scored a total 926 runs (highest in one match being 73), in 37 two-day matches while playing at club level for Bedstone, Ludlow and Radnor.

=== The 1870 University Match ===
The match, scheduled for three days, was finished in two. Cambridge scored 147 in their first innings. Oxford made 175 in reply, with Cobden taking 4/41. Cambridge slumped to 40/5 in their second innings, only 12 runs ahead, with Charles Francis doing most of the damage. William Yardley then came in to join John Dale, and they added 116 for the sixth wicket. Yardley made exactly 100, the first hundred ever made in the fixture. Dale scored 67. Cambridge finished with 206, with Francis taking 7/102.

Oxford needed 179 to win. Cobden took the wicket of Walter Hadow for a duck and Oxford were 0/1. However they recovered and reached 153/3 at one point, needing only another 26, thanks to 69 from Cuthbert Ottaway and 44 from Arthur Fortescue. Though wickets then began to fall, they progressed to 175/6, and their victory seemed assured. At that point Edward Ward dismissed Francis. Ward had taken six of the seven wickets to fall. He finished with the fine figures of 6/29 from 32 four ball overs.

When Cobden began what proved to be the final over, the score was still 175/7, with four runs needed to win. From the first ball, Frederick Hill played a shot which seemed sure to reach the boundary and thus to win the match. However it was brilliantly fielded and the batsmen could only run one. Hill then had to watch the tail-enders try to cope with Cobden in poor light. Samuel Butler was caught off the second ball of the over and William Stewart was bowled by the third. With four-ball overs at that time, Cobden had one ball left. If the batsman, Thomas Belcher, could survive it, then Hill would face the next over and would probably see Oxford home. But Cobden made no mistake and Belcher was bowled. Cobden finished with figures of 4/35, and 8/76 in the match.

== Later life ==
In 1890, Cobden bought a hotel in Capel Curig, North Wales, which he renamed Cobden's Hotel, which he sold in 1907. He died 7 December 1932, in Capel Curig.
