= Charles Everett =

Charles Everett may refer to:

- Charles Carroll Everett (1829–1900), American divine and philosopher
- Charles Everett (cricketer) (1835–1896), English cricketer
- Charles Arthur Everett (1828–1909), merchant and political figure in New Brunswick, Canada
- Charles H. Everett (1855–1947), American politician
- Charles Everett (planter) (c. 1767–1848), American medical doctor, planter and politician
- C. Douglas Everett (1902–1982), insurance agent and political figure in New Brunswick, Canada
