= Phil Hughes (English cricketer) =

English cricketer

Personal information
- Full name: Philip Heywood Hughes
- Born: 17 June 1991 (age 35); Southampton, Hampshire, England
- Height: 6 ft 0 in (1.83 m)
- Batting: Right-handed
- Bowling: Right-arm medium
- Role: Batsman

Domestic team information
- Years: Team
- 2010–2015: Cambridge MCCU
- 2010–2015: Cambridge University

Career statistics
Competition	First-class
Matches	11
Runs scored	500
Batting average	29.41
100s/50s	0/4
Top score	92
Catches/stumpings	2/–
- Source: Cricinfo, 5 July 2015

Philip Heywood Hughes (born 17 June 1991) is an English cricketer. Hughes is a right-handed batsman who bowls right arm medium pace. He was born in Southampton, Hampshire and educated at The Romsey School and Peter Symonds College.

While studying for his degree at Cambridge University, Hughes made his first-class cricket debut for Cambridge MCCU against Sussex in 2010. In that same season he played in the University Match between Cambridge University Cricket Club and Oxford University Cricket Club. During the 2011 season, he made three further first-class appearances for Cambridge MCCU, and once again appeared in that seasons University Match. Hughes struggled against top-class opponents, scoring 91 runs at an average of 15.16, with a high score of 32.
