= Tile Hill Wood =

Wood in Coventry, England

Coordinates: 52.406°N 1.589°W

Tile Hill Woodlands

Tile Hill Wood is a wood between Hawthorn Lane and Banner Lane in the Tile Hill area of Coventry, England. It has been designated as a Site of Special Scientific Interest (SSSI) and a Local Nature Reserve. It is stewarded by the Coventry and District Natural History and Scientific Society. It is a mixed deciduous and coniferous woodland covering 69.92 acres (28.30 ha), with examples of Norway spruce, European larch, and hazel coppice, together with sycamore, oak, spruce, birch, chestnut, ash, and pine.

There are specially-built paths suitable for people with disabilities (660 m). These have metal tap rails for people with visual impairment.

From 1930, Coventry Corporation established the wood as a Nature Reserve and it had a regular forester assigned to it. Rides were kept clear, and the removal of waste was carried out by horse and cart rather than by tractor or lorry. During the Second World War, large areas of scrub and conifers were cleared to reduce the risk of fire from air raids. During the cyclonic gale of March 1947, five acres (2 ha) of mature spruce trees were uprooted. These were replaced with young trees over several years, and helped to alter the ecological balance of the reserve.

The wood received SSSI status in 1952. The status was renewed in 1986 under the Wildlife and Countryside Act of 1981. The site is an example of semi-natural woodland, and one of the last remaining in the county. The ground cover includes bramble and bracken, with wavy hair-grass, creeping soft-grass, honeysuckle, and great wood-rush. Typical woodland plants include wood-sorrel, primrose and bluebells. In the wetter areas woodmillet and remote sedge are found. A pool near the north edge supports bog mosses, marsh cinquefoil, and cyperus sedge. A small mire is rich with mosses and has some clumps of bottle sedge and white sedge. Uncommon fungi on the site include Clavaria rosea, the first time it has been recorded in the county.

== Land ownership ==
All land within Tilehill Wood SSSI is owned by the local authority.
