= Kate Dempsey (poet) =

Poet and founder of Kinsale Mead Co

- Born: 1962 (age 63–64); Bishop's Stortford

Kate Dempsey (born 1962), Irish based poet and founder of Kinsale Mead Co.

== Biography ==
Born in Bishop's Stortford in 1962, Kate Dempsey grew up in Bothwell and Coventry. She went to Finham Park School before she graduated with a degree in physics from St Hilda's College, Oxford. After college, she worked in IT and lived in the UK, Nijmegen in the Netherlands, and Albuquerque, New Mexico. She spent twenty-five years living in Maynooth. She is married to Denis Dempsey and together they founded Kinsale Mead Co. She has won a number of awards for her writing, The Plough Prize, the Cecil Day-Lewis Award as well as commendations for the Patrick Kavanagh Award and The Forward Prizes for Poetry. She has also been shortlisted for Hennessy New Irish Writing Award. Dempsey runs a writers group called Poetry Divas. Her debut Poetry Collection, The Space Between, was published in 2016 by Doire Press.
