= Jamie McGough =

British-Irish playwright

Jamie McGough is a playwright and former international boxer from Coventry, England. His debut play, Fighting Irish, premiered to sell-out audiences at the Belgrade Theatre in 2022 as part of Coventry's UK City of Culture programme. McGough's writing has received critical acclaim for its emotional depth, authenticity, and distinctive voice. Critics have highlighted his ability to balance social and historical commentary with themes of family and identity. His work has also been praised for its pacing and lyrical power, with one reviewer describing it as “visceral yet beautiful.”

== Early life and boxing career ==
McGough was born and raised in Tile Hill, Coventry. He began boxing at a young age, inspired by his family's deep involvement in the sport. Despite losing 18 of his first 24 fights, he became a national champion and represented the England team internationally, emulating the achievements of his uncles. He was described as a 'classy' and 'big-hitting' fighter, with an unusual personality for a boxer. Following his own career, McGough became a coach, working with Commonwealth Games Bronze Medallist and professional boxer Aaron Bowen.

== Writing career ==
In 2021, McGough was selected for the Belgrade Theatre and Paines Plough’s Writer's Programme, during the Roundabout residency for the UK City of Culture 2021. He wrote and performed his short play The Final Bell.

=== Fighting Irish ===
His debut play, Fighting Irish, was commissioned shortly after and premiered at the Belgrade Theatre in April 2022. The play draws on his family’s multigenerational boxing history and explores themes of identity, masculinity, and cultural heritage. It received critical acclaim for its emotional depth and authenticity.

Fighting Irish ran at the Belgrade Theatre from 2–16 April 2022, directed by Corey Campbell. The play was praised by critics for its emotionally charged storytelling and blend of sport and drama. Always Time for Theatre described it as "a gorgeous play", while The Reviews Hub called it "a powerful debut rooted in real lived experience."

Reviewers also illustrated the play's 'exhilarating physicality', with the boxing scenes noted for being 'beautiful and almost balletic'. McGough served as a choreography/fight consultant during the production, utilising his vast experience as a boxer and coach. What's On Live, Behind the Arras and West End Best Friend all awarded the play five stars, calling it 'an absolute knockout' and 'the real thing'.

The production incorporated immersive multimedia, an ensemble cast and it was staged in 'a unique in the round, boxing-ring stage' in the Belgrade's B2 auditorium. It was the first show in the theatre's history to be staged in this format and reflected the play's community-driven roots and Coventry's boxing heritage.

The play also inspired a mural on the Ponderosa in Tile Hill, depicting the poster image from Fighting Irish.

=== Conciencia ===
McGough's play Conciencia received its premiere at Festelón (the festival of Spanish Theatre in London) in October 2025, marking his debut in Spanish-language theatre.

=== While We Sing Together ===
In 2026, McGough and filmmaker Kieran Doherty created While We Sing Together, a fan-led documentary chronicling Coventry City F.C.'s "tumultuous and emotional" journey back to the Premier League and the relationship between the club, its supporters and the city. The premiere was received coverage from the BBC and Coventry Telegraph, with headlines stating that the work was "more than a football story'.

== Reception and impact ==
McGough's work has contributed to Coventry's cultural development during its tenure as the UK City of Culture. His journey from boxer to playwright has been highlighted in multiple media outlets and theatrical institutions, showcasing a rare crossover between sport and the arts.

He has since continued writing and participating in community arts projects in the Midlands, volunteering with The Seanchaí Collective. In 2024, McGough also adapted and produced Anton Chekhov's The Proposal in Valencia, Spain.

In 2026, one of McGough's monologues was selected by Green Curtain Theatre for "The Irish Nation: An Evening of Mosaics, Monologues and Music" in London. The event featured new writing by members of the Irish diaspora, with monologues inspired by beloved Irish icons depicted in Mark Kennedy's "Irish Nation" mosaics.
