= Ruari Crichard =

English cricketer

Personal information
- Full name: Ruari James Crichard
- Born: 9 January 1995 (age 31); Hammersmith, London, England
- Batting: Right-handed
- Bowling: Right-arm medium

Domestic team information
- Years: Team
- 2015–2017: Cambridge University

Career statistics
Competition	First-class
Matches	5
Runs scored	97
Batting average	24.25
100s/50s	0/0
Top score	27*
Balls bowled	864
Wickets	20
Bowling average	25.70
5 wickets in innings	3
10 wickets in match	1
Best bowling	6/68
Catches/stumpings	3/–
- Source: Cricinfo, 30 December 2018

Ruari James Crichard (born 9 January 1995) is a cricketer who played first-class cricket for Cambridge University from 2015 to 2017.

Crichard attended King's College School, Wimbledon, before going up to St John's College, Cambridge, where he studied modern and medieval languages. An opening bowler, in the 2017 University Match he took 5 for 74 and 6 for 68 in Cambridge's 216-run victory. After the match he announced that he would be playing no more first-class cricket.

Crichard took up a position with the JMAN Group management consultancy in London. As of 2023 he is head of commercial development with Octopus Electric Vehicles.
