= Dan Escott =

English cricketer

Personal information
- Full name: Daniel Alexander Escott
- Born: 26 September 1996 (age 30); Torbay, Devon, England
- Batting: Right-handed
- Bowling: Right-arm leg-spin

Domestic team information
- Years: Team
- 2016–: Oxford University
- First-class debut: 5 July 2016 Oxford University v Cambridge University

Career statistics
Competition	First-class
Matches	3
Runs scored	373
Batting average	74.60
100s/50s	2/0
Top score	175
Balls bowled	404
Wickets	10
Bowling average	15.70
5 wickets in innings	1
10 wickets in match	0
Best bowling	6/71
Catches/stumpings	5/–
- Source: Cricinfo, 6 July 2018

Daniel Alexander Escott (born 26 September 1996) is an English cricketer and schoolteacher. On his first-class debut, playing for Oxford University, he scored a century and took six wickets in an innings.

== Cricket career ==
Escott attended Winchester College, where he excelled at cricket, playing in the First XI for five years without missing a match. In his final year, 2015, he set a school record by scoring 1096 runs in a season, beating the previous record set by Mansoor Ali Khan Pataudi in 1959.

He went up to Lincoln College, Oxford, appearing in several minor matches for the university team in 2016 before making his first-class debut in the annual match against Cambridge University. Opening the batting, he made 36 in Oxford's first innings and did not bowl in Cambridge's first innings. In Oxford's second innings he scored 125 off 202 balls, then took 6 for 71 off 31 overs of his leg-spin to help Oxford to victory by 103 runs. In the university match in 2018 he captained Oxford to victory after scoring 175 in Oxford's first innings.

Escott has taught economics at Harrow School since 2019. He is on the Board of Governors at St John's Church of England School in Stanmore.
