= The Romsey School =

Location
- Greatbridge Road; Romsey, Hampshire, SO51 8ZB; England; 50.99488°N 1.50284°W

Information
- Type: Academy
- Motto: Siege Perilous
- Established: 1958
- Local authority: Hampshire
- Specialist: Maths and Computing
- Department for Education URN: 137239 Tables
- Ofsted: Reports
- Chair of Governors: Judith Houghton
- Executive Headteacher: Gwennan Harrison-Jones
- Headteacher: Chris Cove
- Staff: ~100
- Gender: Coeducational
- Age: 11 to 16
- Enrolment: 1100
- Houses: Ashton, Marsham, Stoke and Templer
- Colours: Maroon, Grey, Black, Gold
- Website: theromseyschool.org

The Romsey School is a mixed community academy in Romsey, Hampshire, England. The school was a secondary modern, called Romsey County Secondary School, until the 1970s when it became a comprehensive. In 2000 it became a Specialist Language College jointly with The Mountbatten School. In 2005 the school's specialisation changed to a Mathematics and Computing College. In August 2011 the school became an academy. The school has approximately 1100 children aged 11–16 and 100 teachers. The catchment area includes the villages of Ampfield, Braishfield, Sherfield English, Michelmersh, Timsbury and Awbridge.

In 2010 81% of pupils achieved 5 or more A*–C grades in their GCSEs. 94% of pupils achieved at least a pass on A*-C. In 2018 the Progress 8 measure was average for the school and 50% of pupils achieved Grade 5 or above in English and maths GCSEs, compared to 45% for Hampshire and 40% for England.

== ASD Support Base ==
The school runs an ASD Support Base to support pupils with Special needs and Autistic spectrum disorder. The ASD Base was established in September 2002 to help students on the Autistic Spectrum attend mainstream lessons. In 2009, a sensory garden was built to help resource members relax and carry out gardening work.

== Awards ==
The school won the inaugural 'Community School of the Year' People's Service award from Children & Young People Now magazine in 2006.

== Academy Status ==
The Romsey School converted to an academy under the Academies Act 2010 on 1 August 2011.

== Notable former students ==
- Todd Bennett, Olympic runner
- Phil Hughes, cricketer
- Caroline Nokes, Member of Parliament for Romsey and Southampton North
