= Finham Park School =

Coordinates: 52.37925°N 1.52641°W

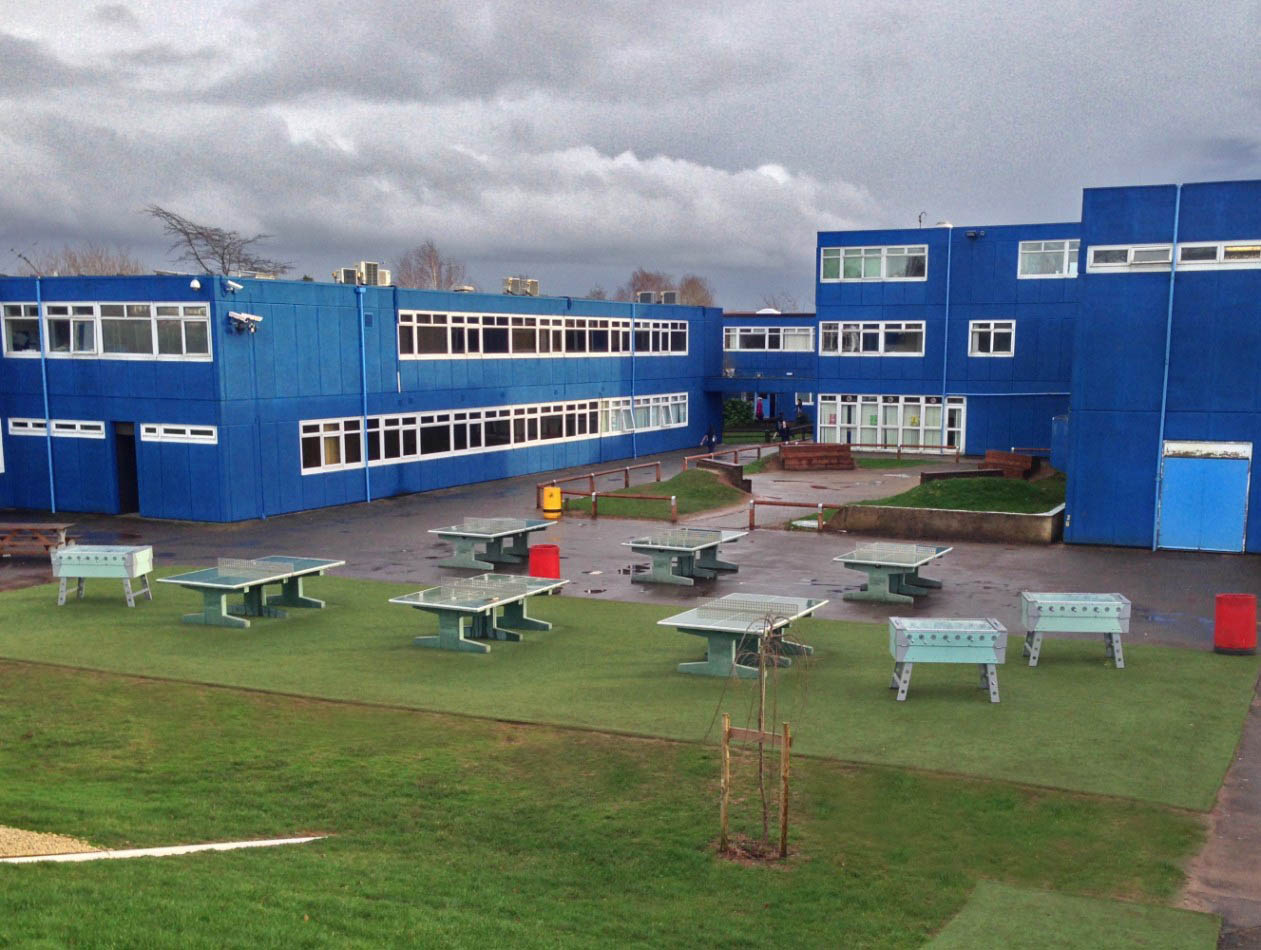

Location
- Green Lane; Coventry, West Midlands, CV3 6EA; England

Information
- Type: Academy
- Established: 1970–71
- Sister school: Finham Park 2
- Local authority: Coventry City Council
- Trust: Finham Park Multi Academy Trust
- Department for Education URN: 136963 Tables
- Ofsted: Reports
- Executive headteacher: Mark Bailie
- Head teacher: David Bedford
- Age: 11 to 19
- Enrolment: 1,760 (approx.)
- Website: finhampark.co.uk

Finham Park School is a secondary school and sixth form with academy status. It is situated on Green Lane in Finham, Coventry, England. Surrounded by Bishop Ullathorne RC School towards the A45, and Finham Primary School further down the road, the site has been a community landmark for multiple generations.

In September 2003, Finham Park became the first Mathematics and Computing College in Coventry.

The headteacher is David Bedford with deputy headteachers Sarah Megeney and Rob Morey.

The school has 1,760 students across the five mandatory years and the two optional years of the sixth form. The student intake is from the Finham, Styvechale, Cheylesmore, Green Lane, Gibbet Hill and Fenside districts of the city, plus certain parts of Earlsdon.

== History ==
=== Early History ===
Finham Park School opened in 1970, but construction of the final school buildings was not completed until late 1971. Before Finham Park School opened, pupils in the area went to a variety of Coventry schools.

=== 2000-2010 ===
In 2005, Finham Park School became the first school in Coventry to offer the IB Diploma Programme, as an alternative to A Levels. Upper sixth form students, the first to take the IB diploma from the school, sat their IB examinations in May 2007; though the IB Diploma is no longer offered.

In 2007, Finham Park was one of the first schools in England to test out the 'Biometric Cashless system' when buying food and drink items from school. Students have their thumbprint scan converted into an 11 digit number, and can then pay by having their thumbprint scanned into a system. Students' parents can top-up their child's account by using ParentPay – an online payment system allowing payments for lunches, trips, book etc.

=== 2010-2020 ===
In 2012 the main school buildings were all painted dark blue.

In January 2014, the school opened a fitness suite for use by students during and after the school day as well as by staff before and after school. The suite was officially opened by Coventry born athlete, David Moorcroft OBE on Friday 17 January

The building originally built for Finham Park 2, for their temporary placement at Finham Park during 2015/2016 is now a large study centre for the Sixth Form, with a recent refurbishment.

=== 2020 Onwards ===
In 2022, after approximately 15 years of use, Finham Park School's 'E Block' was torn down after being used as a 'temporary structure' to house a satellite canteen and the music department. Construction then began to replace the run-down portable building with a permanent brick and mortar structure, named the 'Peter Burns Performing Arts Centre', which opened in 2023. The project cost £5.1M, and the space provides extra classrooms, a large music suite, a large performing arts studio, plus a large canteen/kitchen to provide extra catering facilities before school, at break, and lunch time.

At present, the main buildings are being repainted dark blue and white as well as having new dark grey aluminium windows fitted to replace the old glazed windows.

In 2025, Chris Bishop resigned as Headteacher and David Bedford, previous Headteacher of Blue Coat school, was chosen to be the new Headteacher of Finham Park School.

== Colleges ==
Originally the school was divided into four houses: Leasowes, Manor, Stivichall and Cryfield. Then Stretton, Ryton, Waverley and Kingswood houses were added as the school approached capacity. During a restructure, school houses were then split into Newton, Ada, Whittle, and Galileo; but in 2008 the houses were changed along with a new vertical tutoring system. The new vertical system condensed the houses back to four: North, East, South and West.

In 2020, the school approached capacity again and changed to have five colleges:

- Nubian
- Masai
- Barbary
- Asiatic
- Katanga

These college names are based on different subspecies of lion, some being extinct.

Each pupil belongs to one of the colleges and participates in intercollegiate events to earn points for their college.

== School buildings ==
- A Block – Reception, Psychology, Media, Film Studies, Drama, English, Gym and Sports Hall
- B Block – Modern Foreign Languages
- C Block – History, Religious Education, Social Studies and PSHE (Physical Social Health Education)
- D Block – Geography, History, Adult Education and the School Library
- E Block – Performing Arts Centre, Music, PSHE, Drama, Large Canteen and General Teaching Space
- H Block – Computing, Business Studies, Maths, Textiles, Art and Food Technology
- J Block – Maths and Science
- K Block – Art and Design Technology
- L Block – Science
- M Block – English, Fitness Suite and Canteen
- S Block – The Gateway (Formally The Personalised Learning Centre)
- T Block – Sixth Form Study Centre
- Cafe6 – Sixth Form break and lunch servery
- The View – General classroom space and PE changing rooms
- The Venue – Conference Centre

Most school buildings have two floors, The Gateway, Cafe6, The View are all single floor. A Block has three floors.

== Behaviour for learning system (BFL) ==
Finham Park School has a consequence system for bad behaviour and a reward system for good progress and work in class. The "consequence" system gets worse punishments as the student misbehaves; a C1 is a verbal warning, a C2 is a warning where your name gets written on the board, a C3 is a detention lasting 30 minutes, C4 is being removed to the subject department office and a detention lasting 30 minutes, and a C5 is an isolation.

In 2018, a new policy was introduced called "Restorative Justice". Alongside the regular consequence system, the wrongdoer(s) and the teacher that reported the bad behaviour engage in a restorative conversation, in an attempt to make amends between the teacher and student(s).

== Notable alumni ==
- Kate Dempsey (born 1962), poet
- Matthew Naylor (born 1996), cricketer
- Mark Wood (born 1966), explorer
- Tom Clarke (born 1986), musician

== See also ==
- Finham Park 2
