= Giles Toogood =

English cricketer

Personal information
- Full name: Giles John Toogood
- Born: 19 November 1961 (age 64); West Bromwich, Staffordshire, England
- Batting: Right-handed
- Bowling: Right-arm medium Right-arm off-break

Domestic team information
- Years: Team
- 1995: Cambridgeshire
- 1991–1992: Shropshire
- 1982–1989: Oxford University

Career statistics
Competition	First-class	List A
Matches	34	16
Runs scored	1,403	91
Batting average	27.50	5.68
100s/50s	2/6	0/0
Top score	149	18
Balls bowled	2,125	240
Wickets	26	7
Bowling average	45.46	27.14
5 wickets in innings	1	1
10 wickets in match	1	N/A
Best bowling	8/52	6/47
Catches/stumpings	11/0	0/0
- Source: CricketArchive, 15 March 2009

Giles John Toogood (born 19 November 1961 in West Bromwich) is a former English cricketer. He was educated at North Bromsgrove High School and Oxford University.

He was a right-handed batsman and right-arm medium-pace and off-break bowler who played first-class and List A cricket for Oxford University between 1982 and 1989. Later, he played minor counties cricket for Shropshire in 1991 and 1992 while playing at club level for Barnt Green, and, briefly, Cambridgeshire, appearing at List A level in the NatWest Trophy for both teams.

In 1985, playing in the University Match against Cambridge University at Lord's, Toogood took 8/52 in the first innings (adding another two wickets in the second). This was the best first-class innings return by an Oxford bowler for 61 years, Tom Raikes having claimed 9/38 against the Army in 1924. As of March 2009, Toogood's feat remains the only example of an Oxford player taking seven or more wickets in a first-class innings since Giles Ridley's 7/110 against Gloucestershire in 1965.

He graduated in medicine and works as a surgeon in Yorkshire.

Toogood gained a personal chair from university of Leeds in 2014. He obtained an NIHR HTA grant for the sunflower trial to investigate the role of MRCP in bile duct stones.
