= Matthew Hughes (cricketer) =

English cricketer (born 1996)

Personal information
- Full name: Matthew Stephen Turner Hughes
- Born: 17 April 1996 (age 30); Manchester, England
- Batting: Right-handed

Domestic team information
- Years: Team
- 2015–2018: Oxford University
- First-class debut: 30 June 2015 Oxford University v Cambridge University

Career statistics
Competition	First-class
Matches	4
Runs scored	406
Batting average	50.75
100s/50s	2/1
Top score	116
Balls bowled	186
Wickets	2
Bowling average	47.00
5 wickets in innings	0
10 wickets in match	0
Best bowling	1/16
Catches/stumpings	2/–
- Source: Cricinfo, 24 November 2020

Matthew Stephen Turner Hughes (born 17 April 1996) is an English cricketer and schoolteacher. Playing for Oxford University, he scored a century in each of his first two first-class matches in 2015 and 2016. He now teaches chemistry at Merchant Taylors' School, Northwood, and coaches cricket.

== Cricket career ==
Matthew Hughes attended Stockport Grammar School before going up to Hertford College, Oxford. On his first-class debut, in the annual match against Cambridge University in 2015, he opened the batting for Oxford University and top-scored in each innings, making 41 and 116 in a losing cause. In his next first-class match, the 2016 university match, he made 116 (the top score) and 76 batting at number three, and Oxford won. He also scored 132 not out in the 2018 50-over university match at Lord's to take Oxford to a five-wicket victory with 10 overs to spare.

Since 2018 Hughes has taught chemistry at Merchant Taylors' School, Northwood.
