= Matthew Naylor =

English cricketer (born 1996)

Personal information
- Full name: Matthew A. Naylor
- Born: 11 December 1996 (age 29); Coventry, Warwickshire, England
- Batting: Right-handed
- Bowling: Right-arm medium

Domestic team information
- Years: Team
- 2017–2020: Oxford University

Career statistics
Competition	First-class
Matches	3
Runs scored	235
Batting average	47.00
100s/50s	1/–
Top score	202
Catches/stumpings	–/–
- Source: Cricinfo, 5 November 2024

Matthew A. Naylor (born 11 December 1996) is an English former first-class cricketer.

Naylor was born at Coventry in December 1996. He was educated at Finham Park School, before going up to Merton College, Oxford. While studying at Oxford, he made two appearances in first-class cricket for Oxford University against Cambridge University in The University Matches of 2017 and 2018. In the 2018 fixture, he made 202 runs, which was the sixth-highest individual score since the fixtures inception in 1827.
