= Edward Kenney (cricketer) =

English cricketer

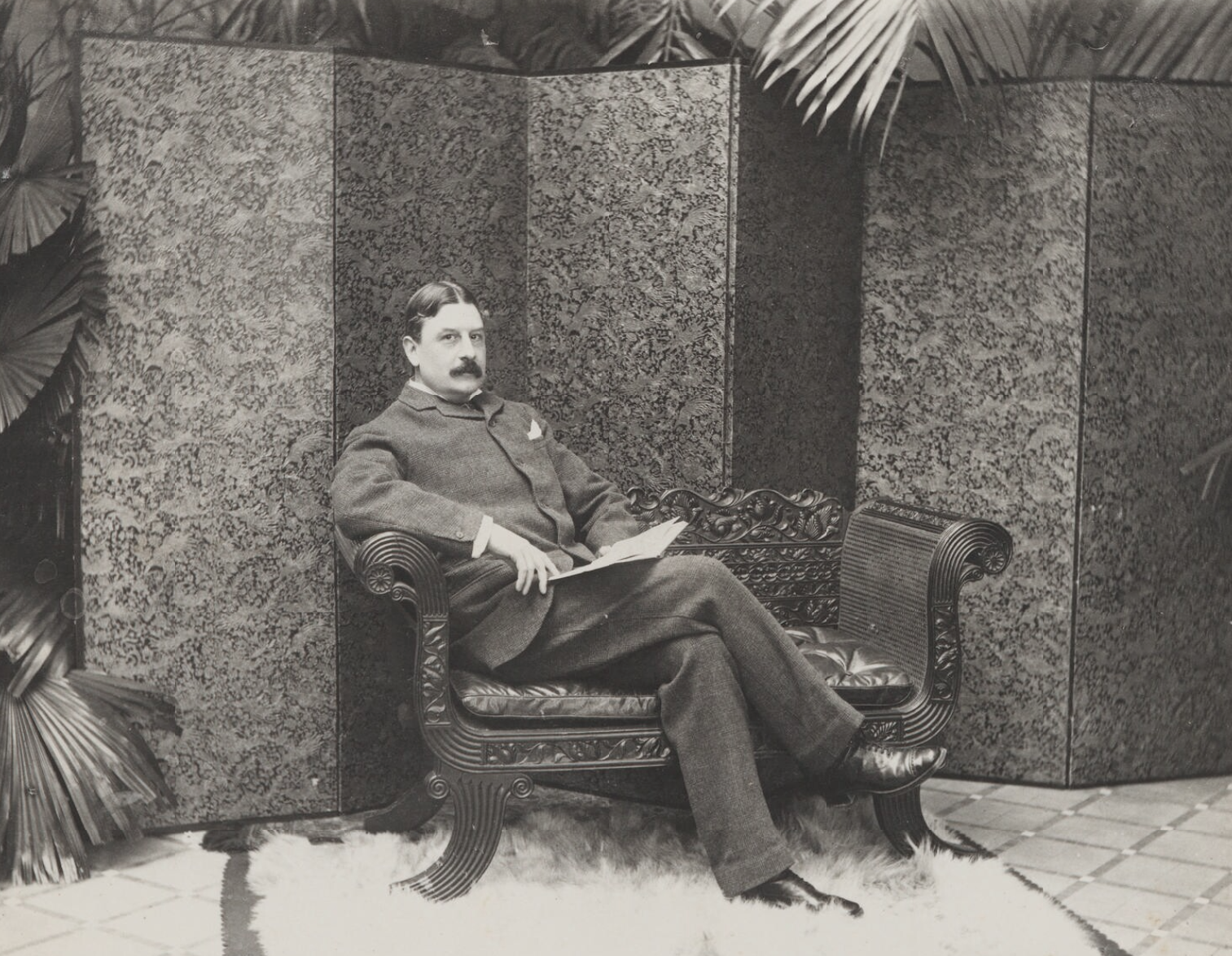

Personal information
- Full name: Edward Maxwell Kenney
- Born: 10 December 1845; Bourton-on-Dunsmore, Warwickshire, England
- Died: 24 January 1916 (aged 70); Ealing, Middlesex, England
- Batting: Right-handed
- Bowling: Left-arm roundarm fast

Domestic team information
- Years: Team
- 1865–1868: Oxford University

Career statistics
Competition	First-class
Matches	17
Runs scored	204
Batting average	9.27
100s/50s	–/1
Top score	64
Balls bowled	2,728
Wickets	66
Bowling average	15.05
5 wickets in innings	5
10 wickets in match	1
Best bowling	8/68
Catches/stumpings	9/–
- Source: Cricinfo, 17 June 2020

Edward Maxwell Kenney (10 December 1845 – 24 January 1916) was an English first-class cricketer and educator.

== Early life ==
The son of The Reverend Arthur Robert Kenney, he was born in December 1845 at Bourton-on-Dunsmore, Warwickshire. He was educated at Rugby School, before going up to Merton College, Oxford in 1864, from which he transferred to Charsley's Hall, Oxford.

== Cricketer ==
While studying at Oxford, he played first-class cricket for Oxford University, making his debut at Oxford against Southgate in 1865. Kenney played first-class cricket for Oxford until 1868, making seventeen appearances. An all-rounder, who bowled left-arm roundarm fast, Kenney took 66 wickets for Oxford at an average of 15.05. In three appearances against Cambridge in The University Match, he took 22 wickets; his career best figures came in the 1866 fixture, where he took 6 for 51 in the Cambridge first innings and 8 for 68 in their second. Described by Wisden Cricketers' Almanack as a right-handed batsman who was a “good and free hitter”, he scored 204 runs at an average of 9.27. He recorded one score of over fifty, making 64 runs against Surrey while batting at number ten.

== Later life ==
After graduating from Oxford, Kenney became a schoolteacher and was for some time an assistant master at Bromsgrove School. He was appointed an H. M. Inspector of Schools in 1874. He added Herbert to his surname in 1875, becoming known as Edward Maxwell Kenney-Herbert. He was elected a member of the Marylebone Cricket Club in 1882 and was also a member of the Free Foresters. In 1901, Kenney was appointed to be a chief inspector for the Board of Education, in addition to being a justice of the peace for Buckinghamshire. He died at Ealing in January 1916, a little under two months before the death of his brother, Arthur Robert Kenney-Herbert.

== Family ==
Kenney-Herbert married in 1876 Lady Jane White, daughter of William Hedges-White, 3rd Earl of Bantry.
