= George Jeffreys =

George Jeffreys may refer to:

- George Jeffreys (composer) (c. 1610–1685), composer and organist to Charles I
- George Jeffreys, 1st Baron Jeffreys (1645–1689), British politician & jurist
- George Jeffreys, 1st Baron Jeffreys (British Army officer) (1878–1960), British soldier & politician
- George Jeffreys (pastor) (1889–1962), British religious leader

== See also ==
- George Jefferies, photographer
- George Jeffery (disambiguation), several people
