= Tile Hill =

Suburb of Coventry, England

Coordinates: 52.40254°N 1.57758°W

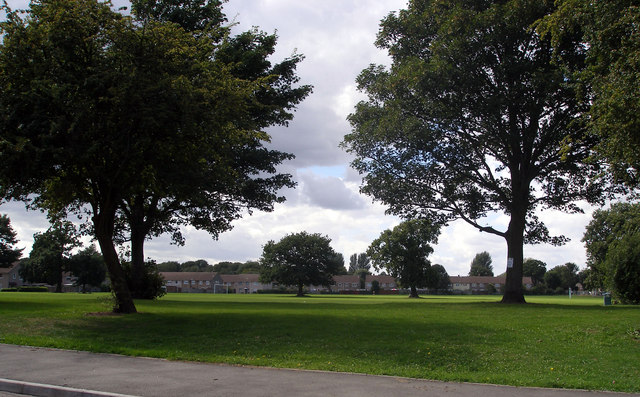
- The Ponderosa

- Location within the West Midlands
- Metropolitan county: West Midlands
- Region: West Midlands
- Country: England
- Sovereign state: United Kingdom
- Post town: COVENTRY
- Postcode district: CV4
- Dialling code: 024
- UK Parliament: Coventry North West; Coventry South

Tile Hill is a suburb in the west of Coventry, West Midlands, England. It is mostly residential and partly industrial, with some common land and wooded areas. Tile Hill railway station is located on the West Coast Main Line which links Coventry with London and Birmingham, and is situated at the southwestern border with the city's Canley district and the Metropolitan Borough of Solihull.

== Geography ==
Tile Hill is seated in the ancient Forest of Arden, and some remnants of the forest remain between the built up areas. Tile Hill Lane is flanked by Plants Hill Wood to the south and Pig Wood to the north. It is bounded by the districts of Lime Tree Park (to the east), Eastern Green (to the north) and Canley (to the south).

Tile Hill Lane approximately divides the suburb into a northern and a southern section comprising three main neighbourhoods, though not all are indicated on local road signage:

- Tile Hill North (north of Tile Hill Lane) which primarily consists of postwar state housing (aside from Nutbrook Avenue), extends to Broad Lane in the north, beyond Banner Lane to the west, and to Tile Hill Lane in the south.
- Tile Hill South (south of Tile Hill Lane) which comprises mainly private residences extends from Tile Hill Lane in the north, to the railway line in the south.
- Tile Hill Village which is the more prosperous area and provides the main gateway into Coventry and out towards Burton Green (Warwickshire) and Solihull Borough, at the city's western extremity.

The Tanyard Farm area was built in the early-1980s and is an extension of Tile Hill Village to the north, and to the west of Banner Lane towards Eastern Green.

== Education ==
There are two secondary schools in Tile Hill: Finham Park 2 and West Coventry Academy.

Primary and junior schools in Tile Hill include Our Lady of the Assumption Catholic Junior School, Leigh Church of England Junior School, Limbrick Wood Primary School, whilst Templars Junior School has been replaced by housing and resited.

Hereward College is a further education college for students with disabilities of various kinds. Coventry College (formerly Tile Hill College before it merged with Coventry Technical College in 2002), was adjacent to Hereward College. The college buildings have since been demolished and Coventry College has relocated to a new purpose-built campus close to Swanswell Pool, near Coventry city centre.

== Local landmarks ==
Some of the notable landmarks in the Tile Hill area include:

- Site of the former Massey Ferguson/AGCO factory, offices and social club which closed in 2003. The 16-storey 1970s Massey Ferguson office tower was demolished on 8 July 2012. The former factory buildings have been demolished to make way for a mixed-use development with housing and a science and technology park containing small industrial units.
- The new Tile Hill Library, One Stop Shop and Neighbourhood Management Centre was opened by the Deputy Lord Mayor of Coventry Councillor Jack Harrison MBE JP with the cutting of a ceremonial cake on Friday 23 May 2008.
- Pig Wood.
- Limbrick Wood.
- Plants Hill Wood.
- Tile Hill Wood and nature reserve.
- Maxims Casino.
- "The Ponderosa", the local name of a small park, named after the ranch on the Bonanza TV series being broadcast at the time the park was made.
- The "Banana" flats on Jardine Crescent.
- Our Lady of the Assumption Roman Catholic Church.
- St. Oswald's Anglican Church.
- St. James Fletchamstead
- Limbrick Wood Baptist Church
- Tile Hill Social Club (demolished August 2012)
- Standard Triumph Social Club.
- Wing Wah Chinese restaurant.
- The Penny Farthing restaurant.
- The Newlands public house.
- The Bell Inn.
- Jardine Crescent shopping precinct.

== Notable residents ==
The artist George Shaw moved with his family to Tile Hill in 1968. Their new home sat within a post‑war estate built as part of the nationwide drive to create a modern, forward‑looking Britain. The estate is open-plan, cut across by long paths and roads, and edged with woods, a remnant of what was once the Forest of Arden. This suburban landscape became Shaw’s lifelong subject. Using Humbrol model paint, an unconventional medium more often found in children’s Airfix hobby kits, he created meticulously detailed, almost photo‑realistic paintings.

The children’s author Cathy Cassidy also grew up in Tile Hill and used some of her childhood memories in her books. Similarly, former boxer Jamie McGough, born and raised in Tile Hill, drew on family history in Tile Hill for his first major play, Fighting Irish.

== Notable events ==
Tile Hill was a scene of carnage and made the national headlines on 19 December 1988 when the Tile Hill Village branch of Midland Bank was raided by two armed robbers. When police responded and pursued the raiders, one of them shot dead 29-year-old officer Gavin Carlton and wounded his colleague Leonard Jakeman as the pursuit reached Torrington Avenue. The gunman, 22-year-old David Fisher, then broke into a house in the city's Earlsdon district, where he was surrounded by armed officers before shooting himself dead.

== Roads named after people ==
- Jardine Crescent is named after Dan Jardine, the Site Foreman during the construction of the Tile Hill North estate.
- Dormer Harris Avenue is named after Mary Dormer Harris (1867–1936) the local historian.
- Robert Cramb Avenue named after the Lord Mayor of Coventry in 1947.
- James Green Road, named after the engineer responsible for surveying the route of the Bude Canal.

== Photographs ==
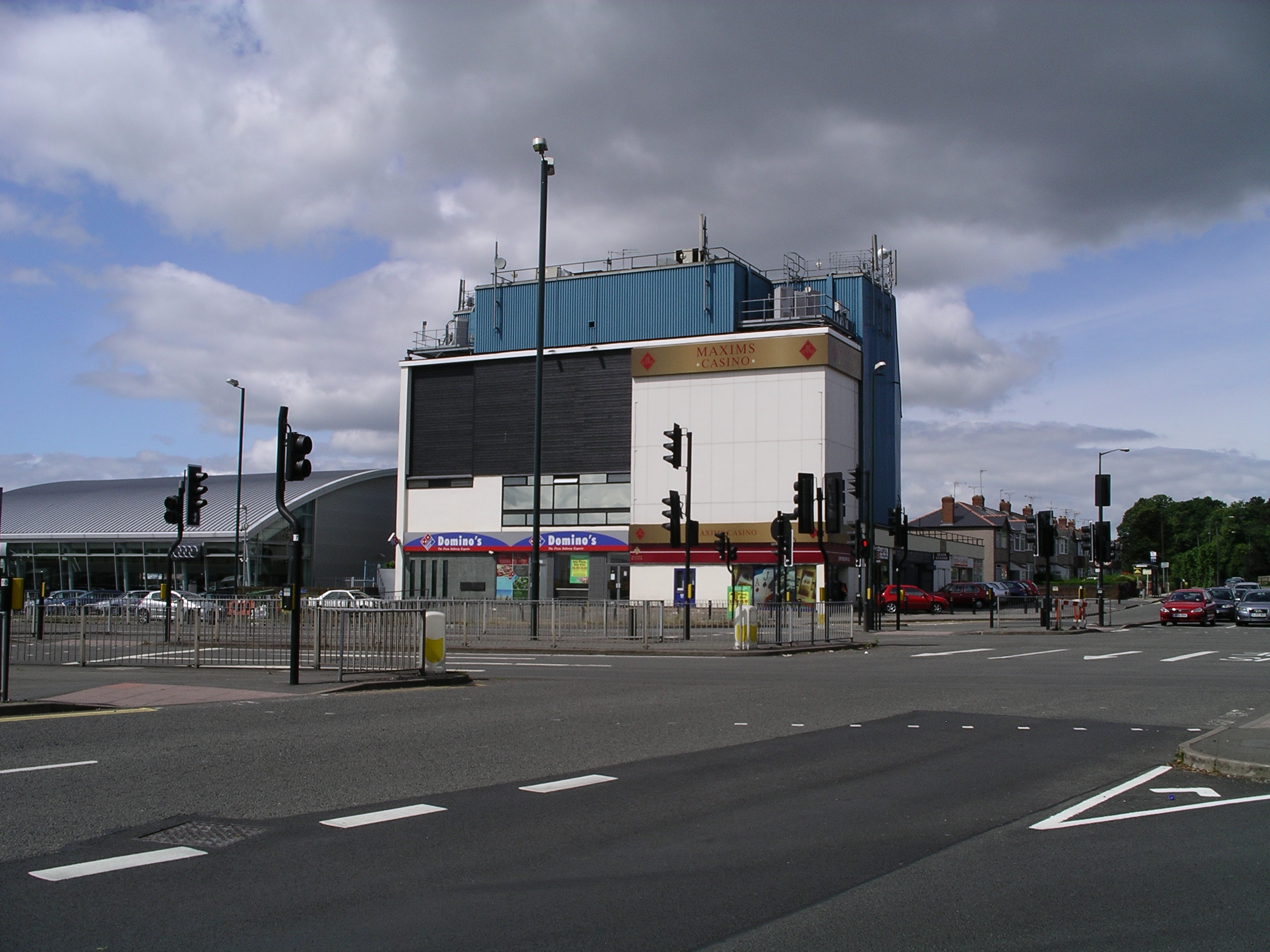
Maxims Casino (June 2008) (casino now closed - building is now used by 'Winners Chapel')

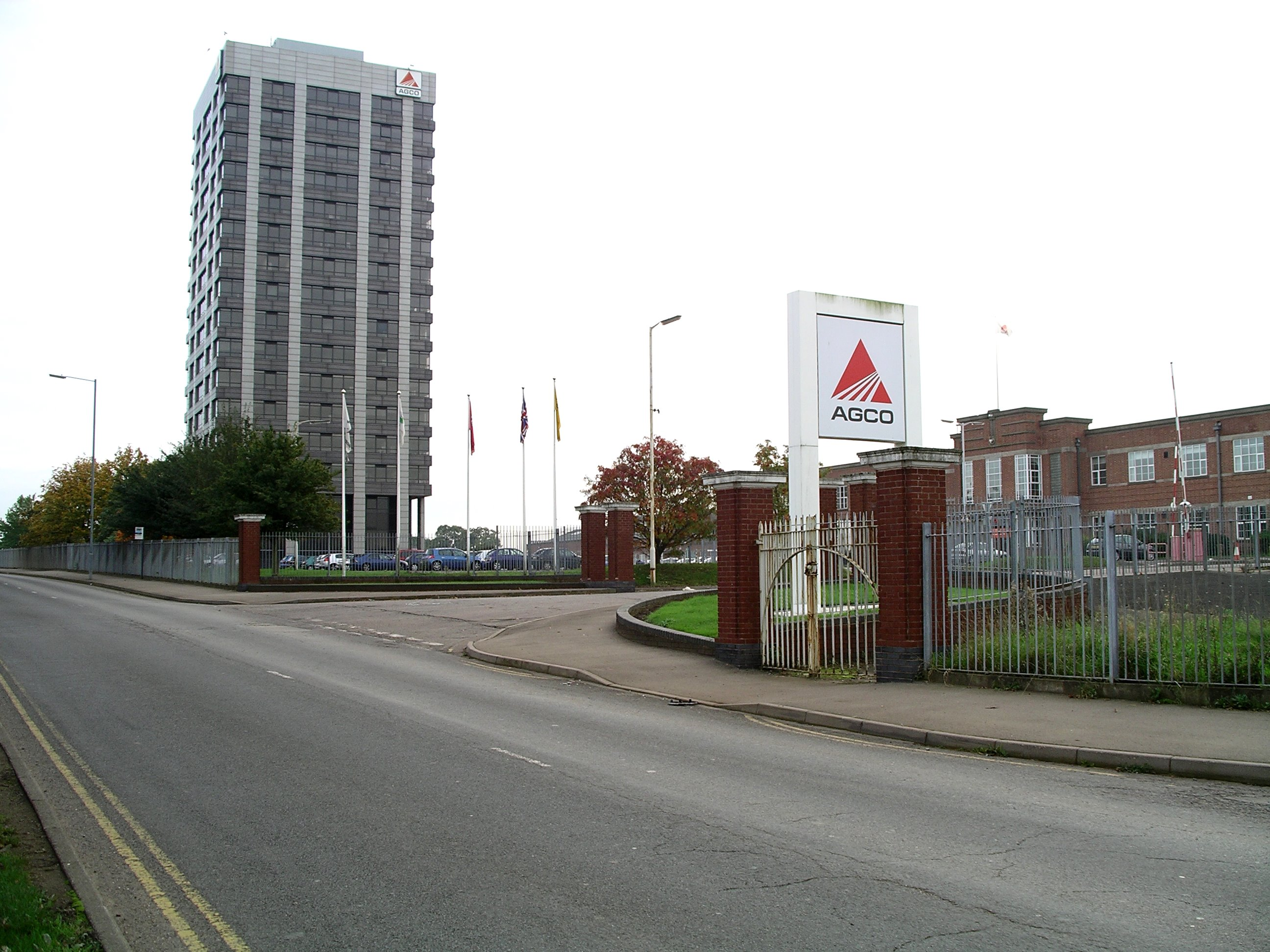
Massey Ferguson/AGCO tower, demolished in summer 2012

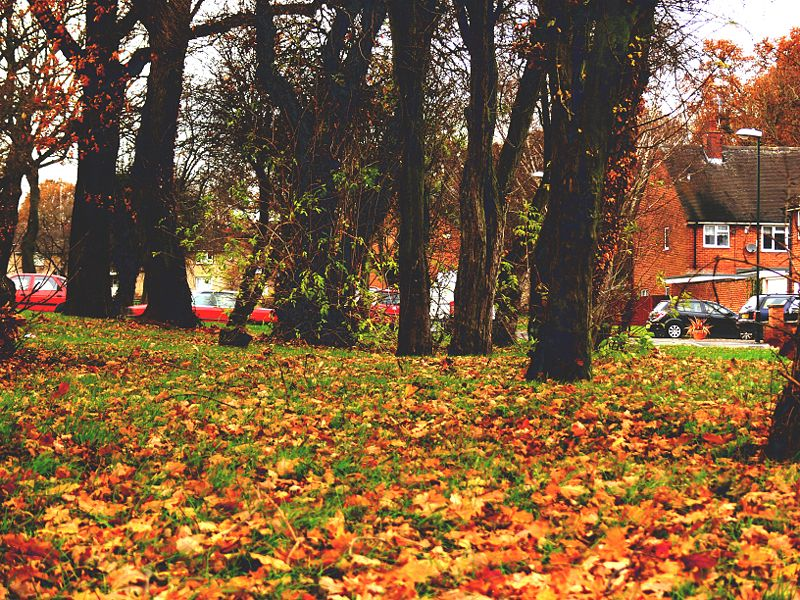
Autumn in Gravel Hill

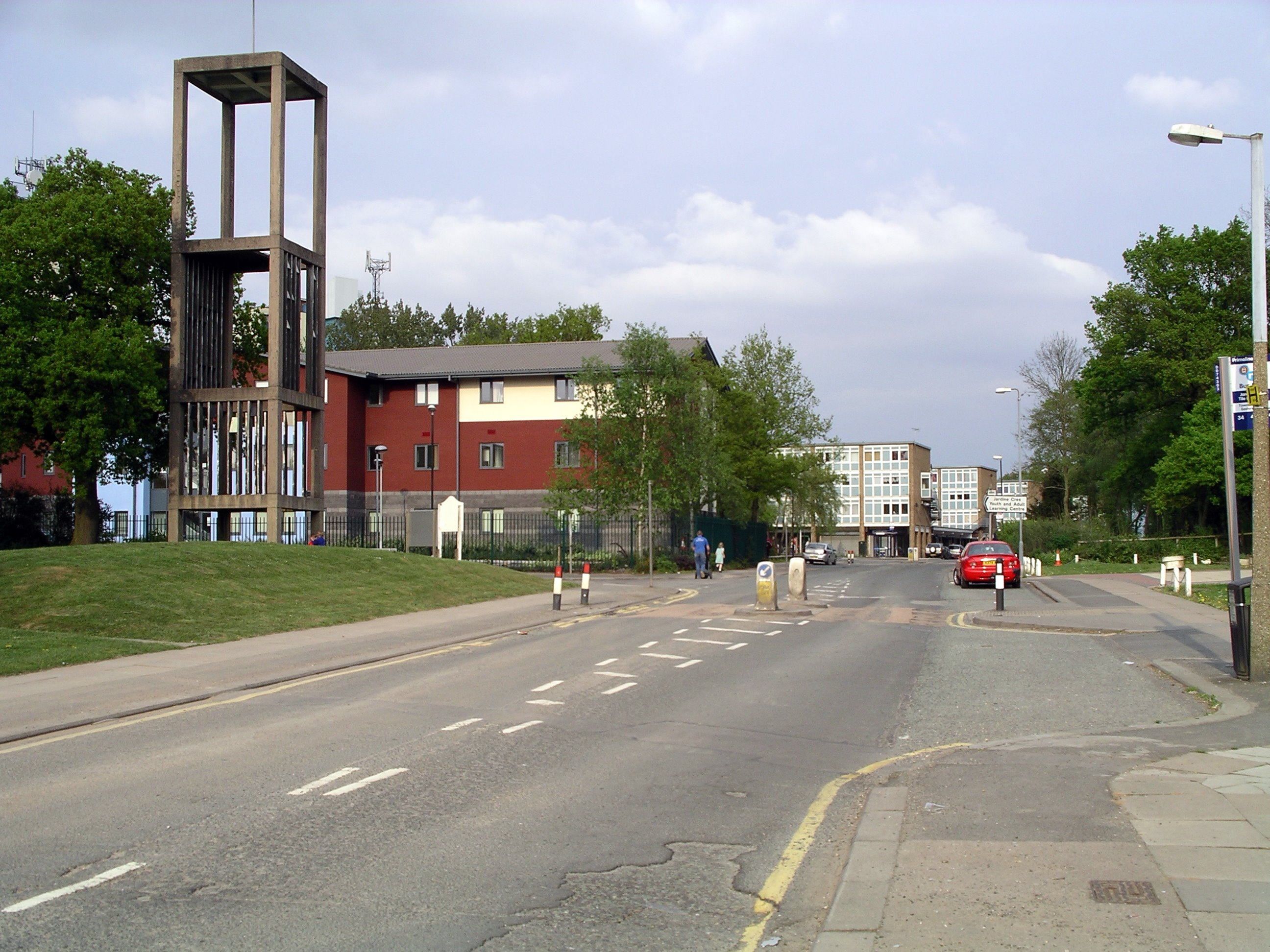
The distinctive St. Oswalds church tower on Jardine Crescent

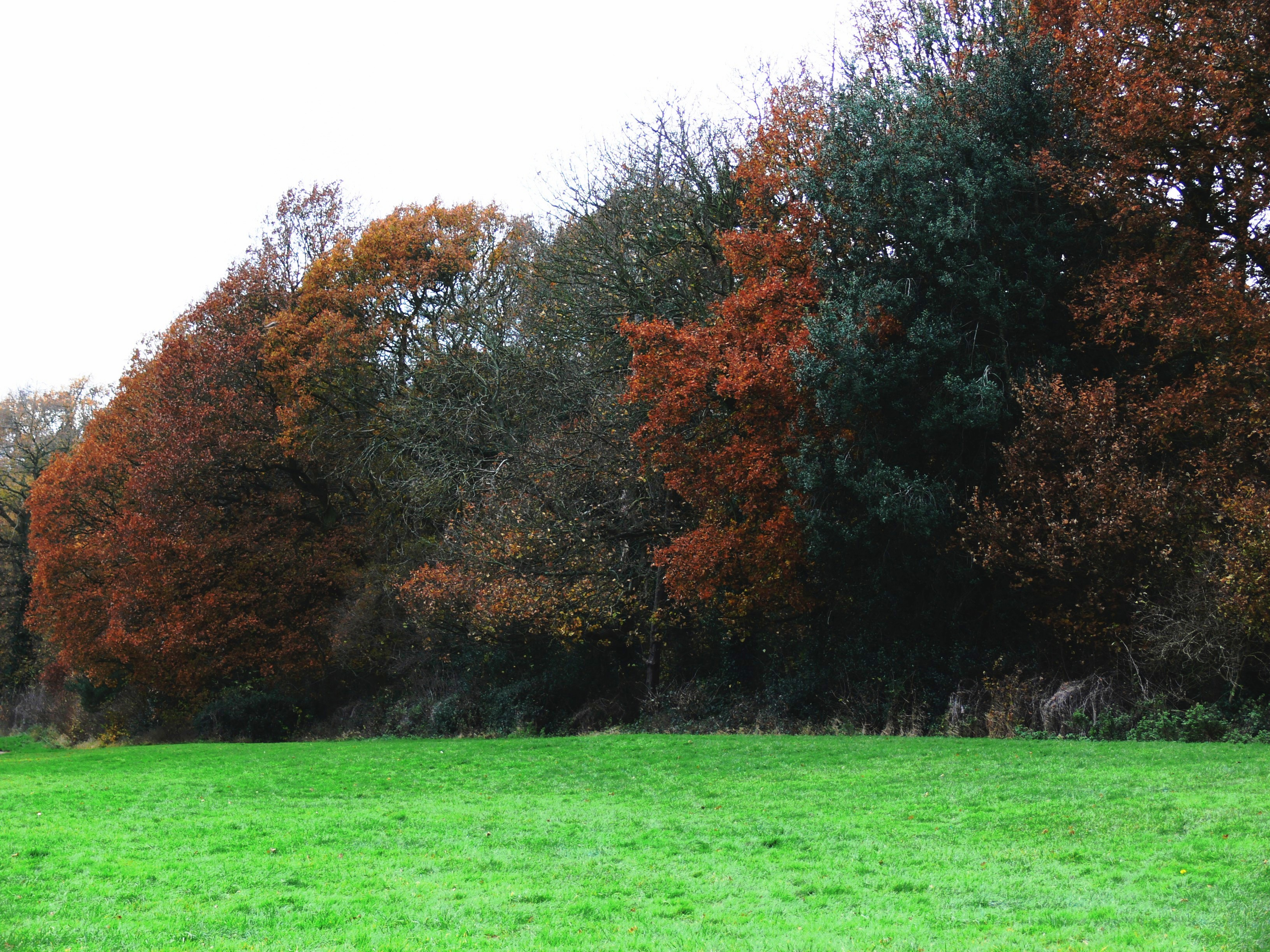
Southern edge of Plants Hill Wood

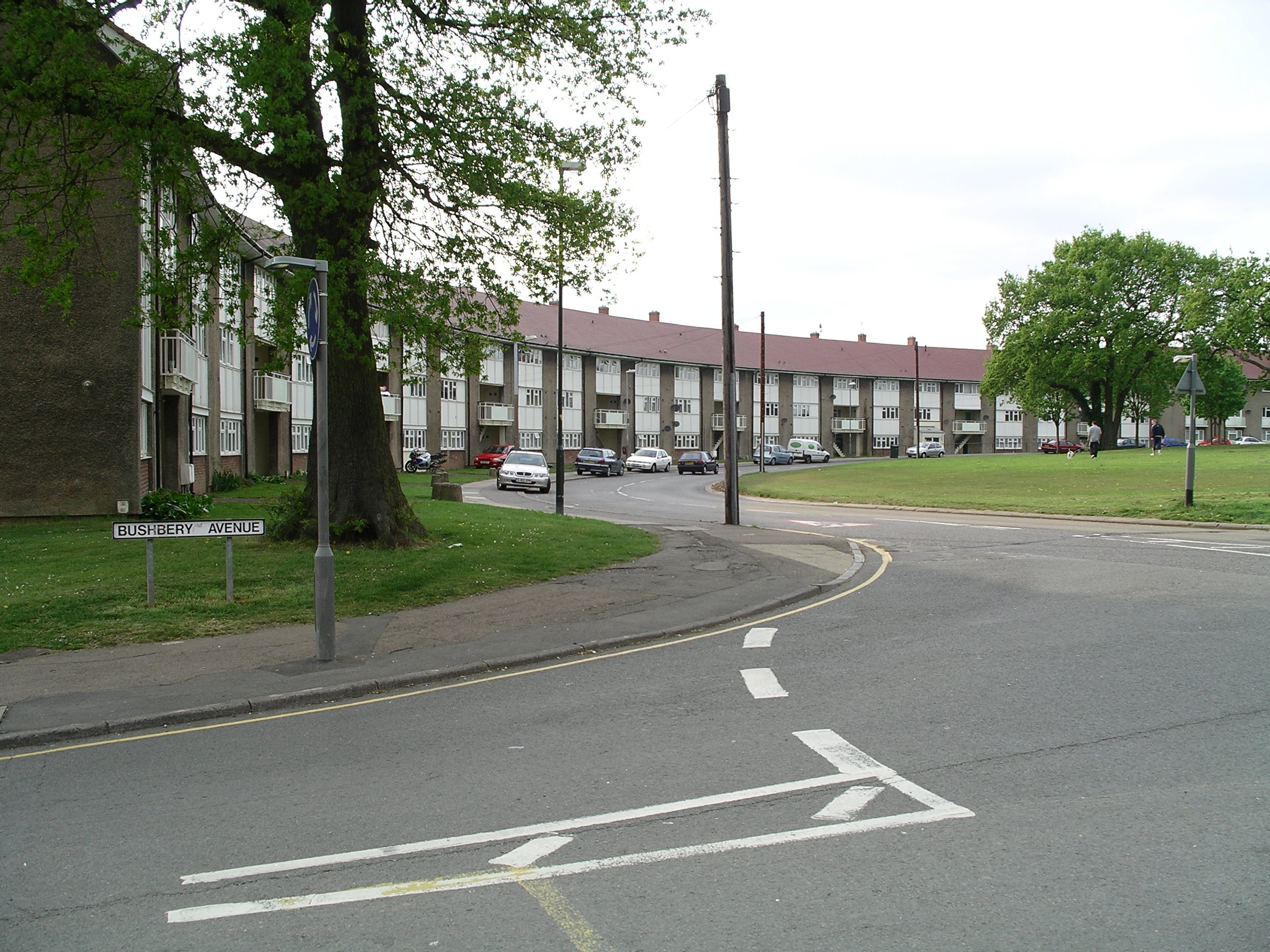
The "Banana" flats on Jardine Crescent, Tile Hill North

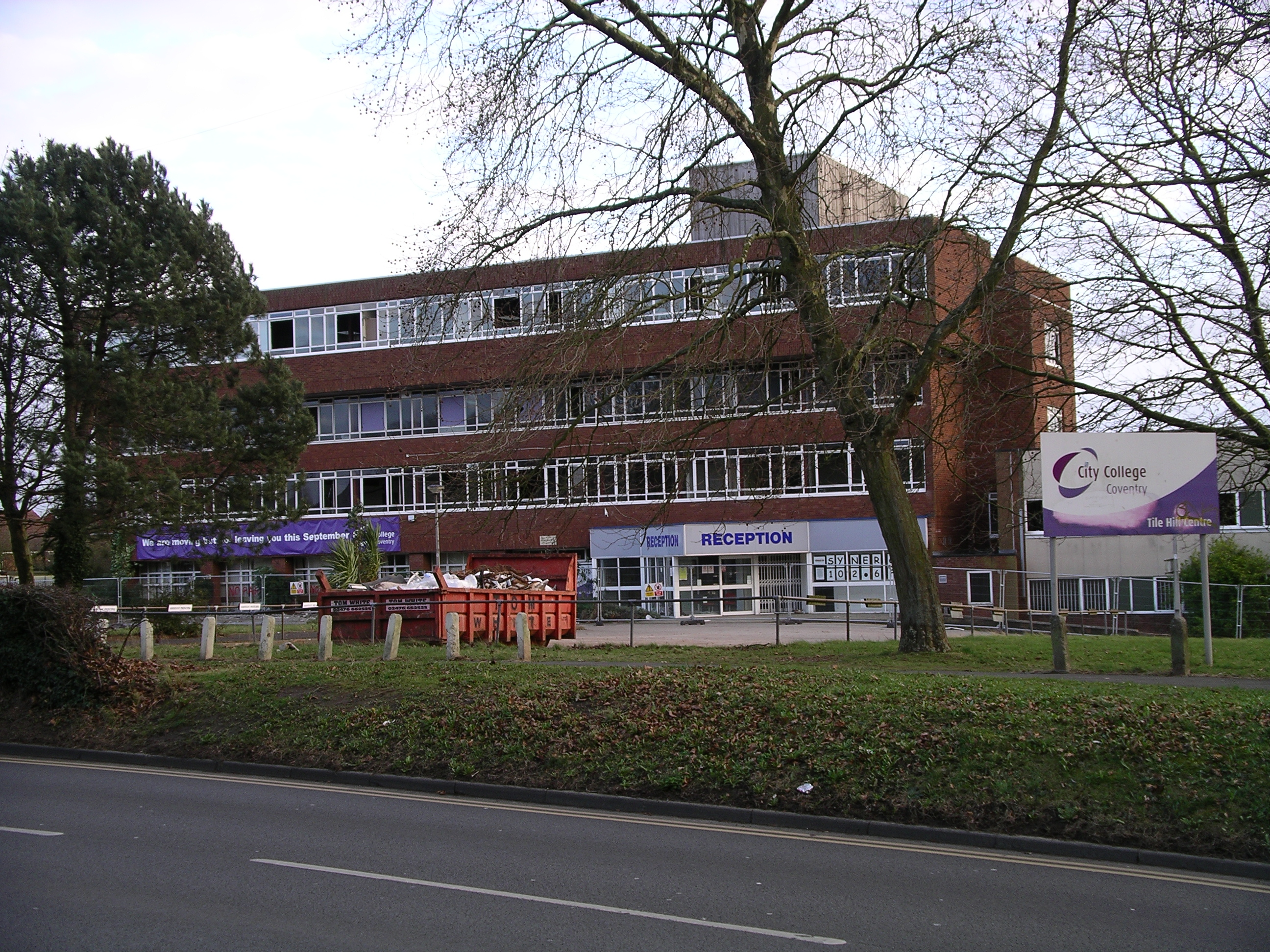
The former Tile Hill Centre of City College (now demolished)
