= George Hargrave =

English cricketer (born 1999)

Personal information
- Full name: George Thomas Hargrave
- Born: 27 July 1999 (age 27); Walsall, Staffordshire, England
- Batting: Right-handed
- Role: Wicket-keeper

Domestic team information
- Years: Team
- 2017: Shropshire
- 2019: Oxford University

Career statistics
Competition	First-class
Matches	1
Runs scored	151
Batting average	75.50
100s/50s	1/0
Top score	146
Catches/stumpings	0/–
- Source: Cricinfo, 5 May 2020

George Thomas Hargrave (born 27 July 1999) is an English first-class cricketer.

== Early life and career ==
Hargrave was born at Walsall in July 1999. He was educated at Shrewsbury School, before going up to Hertford College, Oxford. While studying at Oxford, he made a single appearance in first-class cricket for Oxford University against Cambridge University in The University Match of 2019 at Fenner's. Batting twice in the match, he was dismissed in the Oxford first innings for 146 by Thomas Balderson, while in their second innings he was dismissed for 5 by Aaron Amin. He has previously played minor counties cricket for Shropshire, making a single appearance for the county in the 2017 MCCA Knockout Trophy against Staffordshire at Shrewsbury.
