= Halsted Cobden =

English cricketer

Personal information
- Full name: Halsted Sayer Cobden
- Born: 20 November 1845; Marylebone, London
- Died: 5 January 1909 (aged 63); Wincanton, Somerset
- Batting: Right-handed

Domestic team information
- Years: Team
- 1872: Gloucestershire
- Source: Cricinfo, 4 April 2014

Halsted Sayer Cobden (20 November 1845 – 5 January 1909) was an English cricketer. He played four matches for Gloucestershire in 1872. His brother, Frank Cobden, also played first-class cricket.
