= Cobden's Hotel =

Hotel in Capel Curig, Conwy, Wales

Coordinates: 53°06′03″N 3°53′47″W

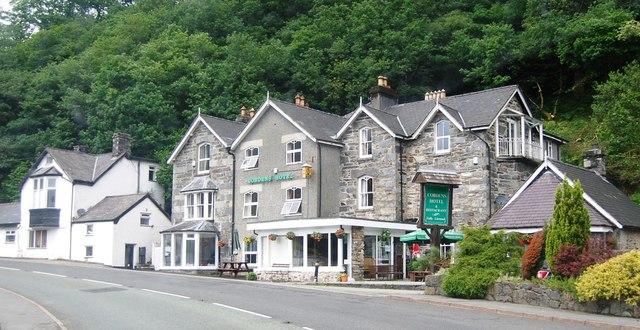
The hotel in 2012

Cobden's Hotel is a 19th-century hotel in Capel Curig, Conwy, Wales. It became famous after it was bought by the celebrated cricketer Frank Cobden and is reputedly haunted.

== Location ==
The hotel is on the A5, a major road through North Wales, to the east of the village centre and the junction with the A4086 to Llanberis. It is next to the banks of the River Llugwy, and in the Snowdonia National Park. The grounds of the hotel extends out to the river. It is also a popular stopping point for canoeing along the river.

== History ==
The hotel was originally known as Tan-y-Bwlch ("under the pass"). It was bought by the Cambridge University and Marylebone Cricket Club cricketer Frank Cobden in 1890. The hotel became subsequently well-known because of Cobden's celebrity status. He sold the hotel in 1907 and retired; dying in Capel Curig in 1932 aged 83.

Cobden's subsequently became popular as a stopping point for walkers around Snowdonia. Frank Cobden's daughter, Evelyn, is reported to haunt the property. Several guests have claimed to have seen ghosts, particularly in one room with an outside balcony. A subsequent owner has suggested Evelyn is a "benign presence" in the property.

The business closed in 2016. The following year, it was put on the market with a guide price of £450,000. It has since re-opened.

== Architecture ==
The hotel is a two storey building with an additional attic, and features arch-headed windows. It includes a Mountain Bar at the rear of the property, which is built around a fresh water stream running through a rock.
