= Salil Oberoi =

Indian cricketer (born 1983)

Salil Oberoi (born 7 December 1983 in Delhi) is an India cricketer who played first-class cricket in England for Oxford UCCE. He also represented Delhi having coming through their youth teams.

Oberoi was a Rhodes Scholar and an alumnus of St. Stephen's College, Delhi, where he studied Economics between 2001 and 2004. He completed his schooling from Modern School, Delhi

In 2005, Oberoi made 247 against Cambridge at Fenner's in the Varsity Match. This was the third-highest of all time for a side representing Oxford University; the previous two higher scores were both made in the 19th century. It was also the highest ever in a Varsity Match. This record was surpassed in July 2013 when Samridh Agarwal scored 313 not out for Oxford in the fixture.
