= Avish Patel =

English cricketer (born 1994)

Personal information
- Full name: Avish Rasiklal Patel
- Born: 31 July 1994 (age 32); Leicester, Leicestershire, England
- Batting: Right-handed
- Bowling: Leg break

Domestic team information
- Years: Team
- 2015–2016: Cambridge University
- 2016: Cambridge MCCU

Career statistics
| Competition | First-class |
|---|---|
| Matches | 3 |
| Runs scored | 118 |
| Batting average | 23.60 |
| 100s/50s | –/1 |
| Top score | 61 |
| Balls bowled | 658 |
| Wickets | 13 |
| Bowling average | 33.53 |
| 5 wickets in innings | 2 |
| 10 wickets in match | – |
| Best bowling | 5/86 |
| Catches/stumpings | –/– |
- Source: Cricinfo, 6 September 2020

Avish Rasiklal Patel (born 31 July 1994) is an English former first-class cricketer.

Patel was born in July 1994 at Leicester, where he was educated Leicester Grammar School before going up to Robinson College, Cambridge. While studying at Cambridge, he made two first-class appearances for Cambridge University against Oxford University in The University Matches of 2015 and 2016, in addition to making a single first-class appearance for Cambridge MCCU against Essex in 2016. (Note: Cambridge MCCU differed from Cambridge University Cricket Club in that it was open to students at Anglia Ruskin University, whereas Cambridge University Cricket Club is exclusively for students of the constituent colleges of the University of Cambridge.) He scored 118 runs in his three first-class matches, with a top score of 61 for Cambridge University. With his leg break bowling, he took 13 wickets at an average of 33.53, with Patel taking two five wicket hauls and best figures of 5 for 86.
