= Mark Wood (explorer) =

British explorer (born 1967)

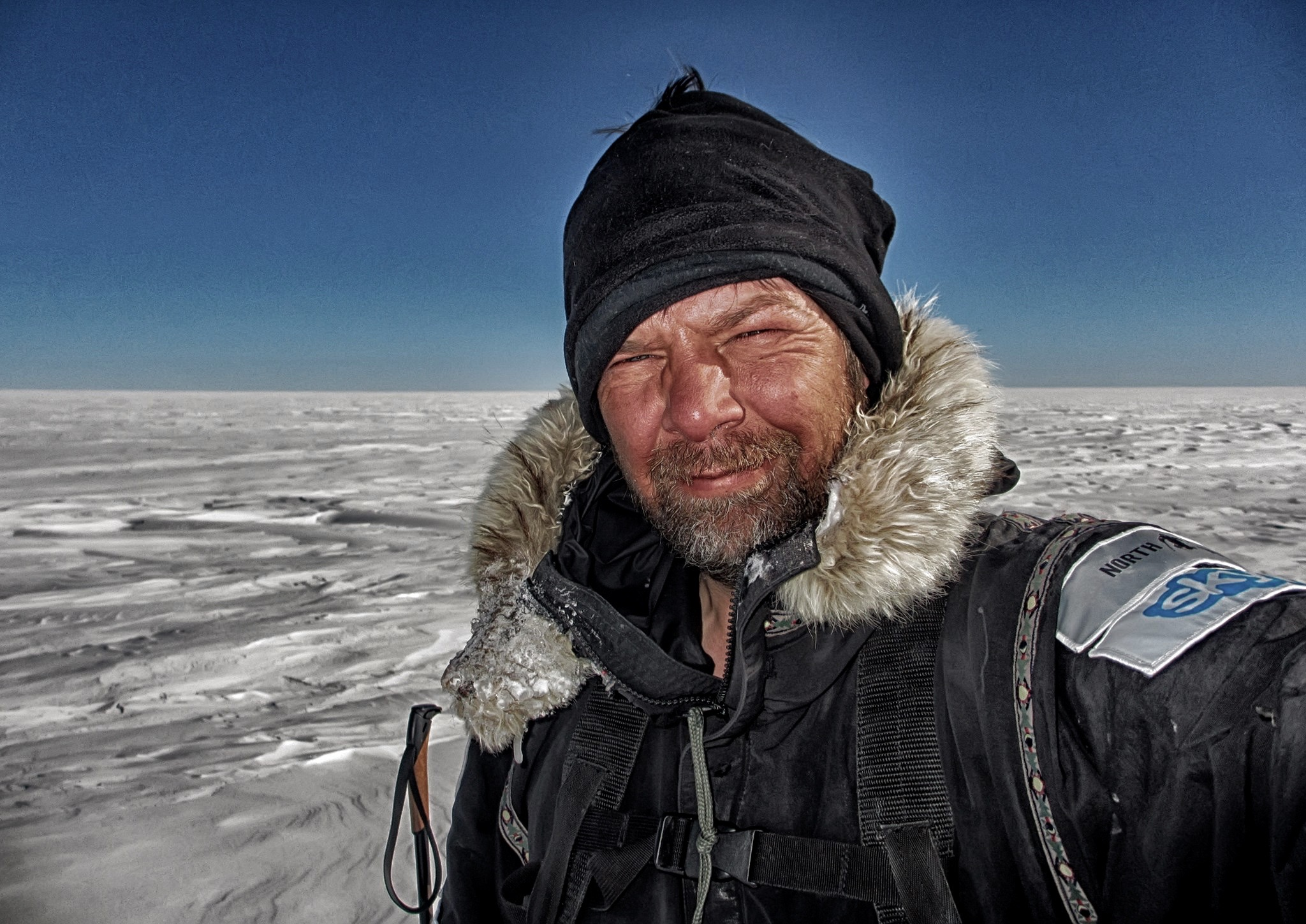
- Mark Wood south pole solo
- Born: 8 December 1966 (age 59); Coventry, Warwickshire, England
- Education: Stivichall Junior School, Coventry & Finham Park School
- Occupations: British Army Firefighter in the Royal Berkshire, Fire and Rescue Service; expedition leader, expedition leader, professional speaker and author
- Awards: Queen Elizabeth II Golden Jubilee Medal, United Nations Medal
- Military career
- Allegiance: United Kingdom
- Branch: British Army
- Rank: Fusilier
- Unit: Royal Regiment of Fusiliers
- Website: www.markwoodexplorer.com

Mark Wood FRGS (born 1966), is a British explorer, professional speaker, expedition leader, and author. He served in the British Army in the Second Battalion, Royal Regiment of Fusiliers, and as a firefighter in the Royal Berkshire Fire and Rescue Service. He subsequently became an explorer, and expedition leader where he has trained and led teams for major Polar and mountain expeditions in extreme environments such as the Arctic Circle, the Himalayas, Antarctica, Alaska, and the Canadian and Norwegian High Arctic to raise awareness of climate change and creates very large virtual classrooms to talk to schools and children about these issues.

== Early life and education ==
Mark was born in Coventry and attended two local schools: Stivichall Primary School and Coventry Finham Park School.

== Military ==
Mark served in the British Army in the Second Battalion, of the Royal Regiment of Fusiliers, UK. He was in the military for a number of years and was awarded the Queen Elizabeth II Golden Jubilee Medal.

== Firefighter ==
Once he left the military he became a firefighter in the Royal Berkshire Fire and Rescue Service.

== Expeditions and exploration ==
As an expedition leader and an explorer he has since 2003 been to various Polar regions ranging from reaching the Magnetic North Pole, the Geomagnetic North Pole twice, and solo expeditions to both the Geographic North Pole and the South Pole. He has worked with the BBC and Channel 5 on various documentaries, having trained teams of people to undertake expeditions, and led expeditions in the extremes of the planet. His documentaries range from: the life of dog teams in Alaska, surviving solo in the Polar extremes, the reality of global warming and its effect on the Arctic Ocean en route to the North Pole. More recently the aim of his expedition is to explain, to children in their classrooms, using the medium of Skype combined with film and sound, during his expeditions, the effects of global warming in the Polar regions where the effects of climate change and global warming are clearly evident. As all of his expeditions are connected with climate change and to empower the younger generations he works with The Prince's Trust, he is a scout leader for the 1st Pillerton Scout Group, a patron of the Children's University, an explorer for IGGY.

== Positions and awards ==
- Chair of the Great Britain and Ireland Chapter, The Explorers Club
- Member of The Explorers Club, Norwegian Chapter
- Royal Geographical Society Fellowship of the Royal Geographical Society, London, England
- Explorer for IGGY
- Polar Explorer for Warwick University
- Ambassador of The Prince's Trust
- Scout Ambassador to 1st Pillerton Scout Group
- The Peoples Moon Ambassador – Apollo 50th anniversary
- Ambassador to Sporting Equals
- Patron of Children's University
- Patron of Patron for Hire A Hero
- Honorary Doctorate from Arden University

== Selected publications ==
- Wood, Mark (2020). Rock & Ice: Expedition Photography (1st ed.). UK: Words by Design. p. 142. ISBN 978-1-909075-53-5.
- Wood, Mark (2020). Solo Explorer (1st ed.). UK: Words by Design. pp. 162pp. ISBN 978-1-909075-52-8.
