= Finham =

Area of Coventry in West Midlands, England

Coordinates: 52.373337°N 1.514345°W

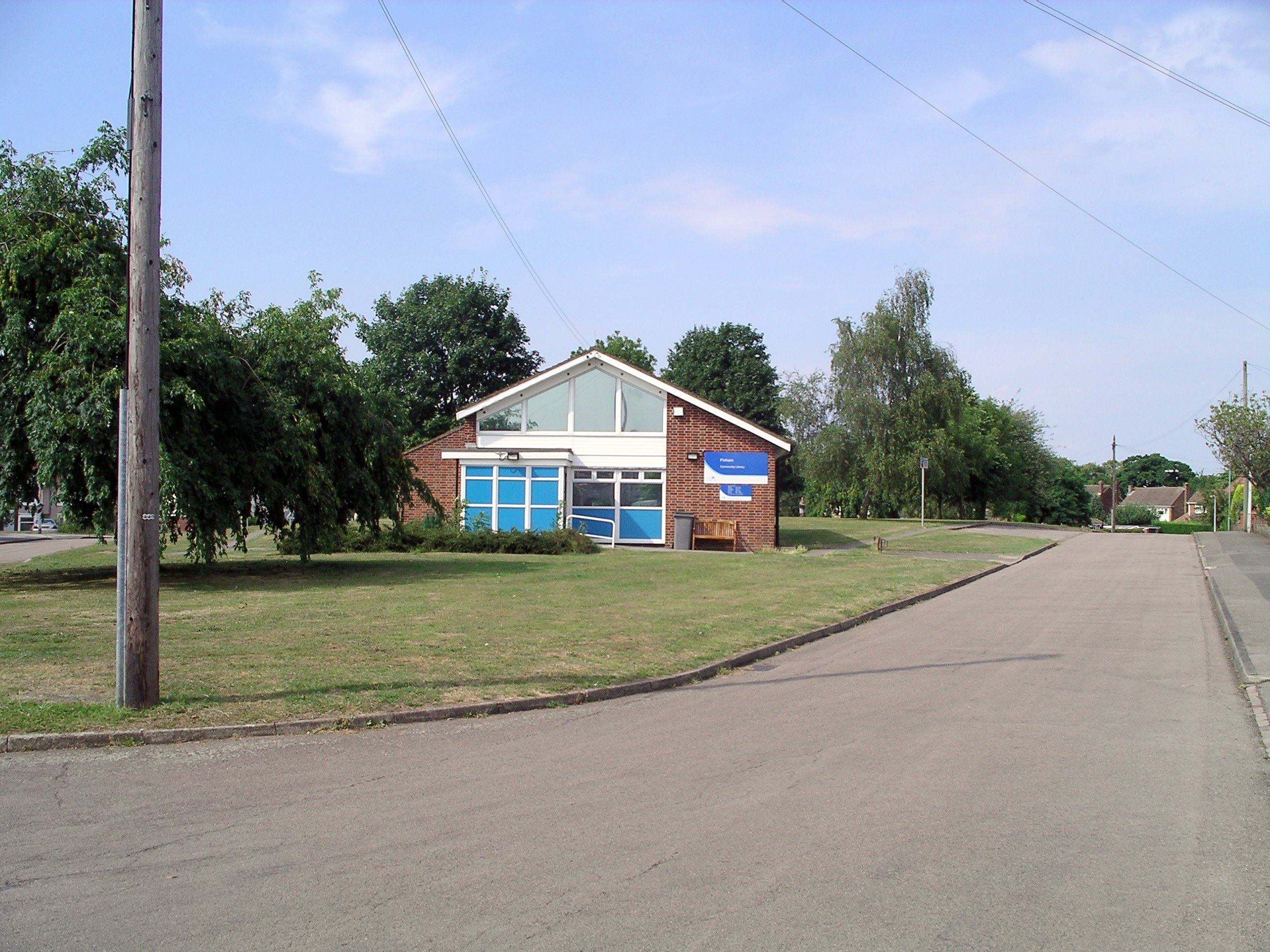
- Finham Green and Finham Library

- Location within the West Midlands
- Civil parish: Finham; Baginton
- District: Coventry; Warwick District
- Shire county: West Midlands; Warwickshire
- Region: West Midlands
- Country: England
- Sovereign state: United Kingdom
- Post town: COVENTRY
- Postcode district: CV3
- Dialling code: 024
- UK Parliament: Coventry South; Kenilworth and Southam

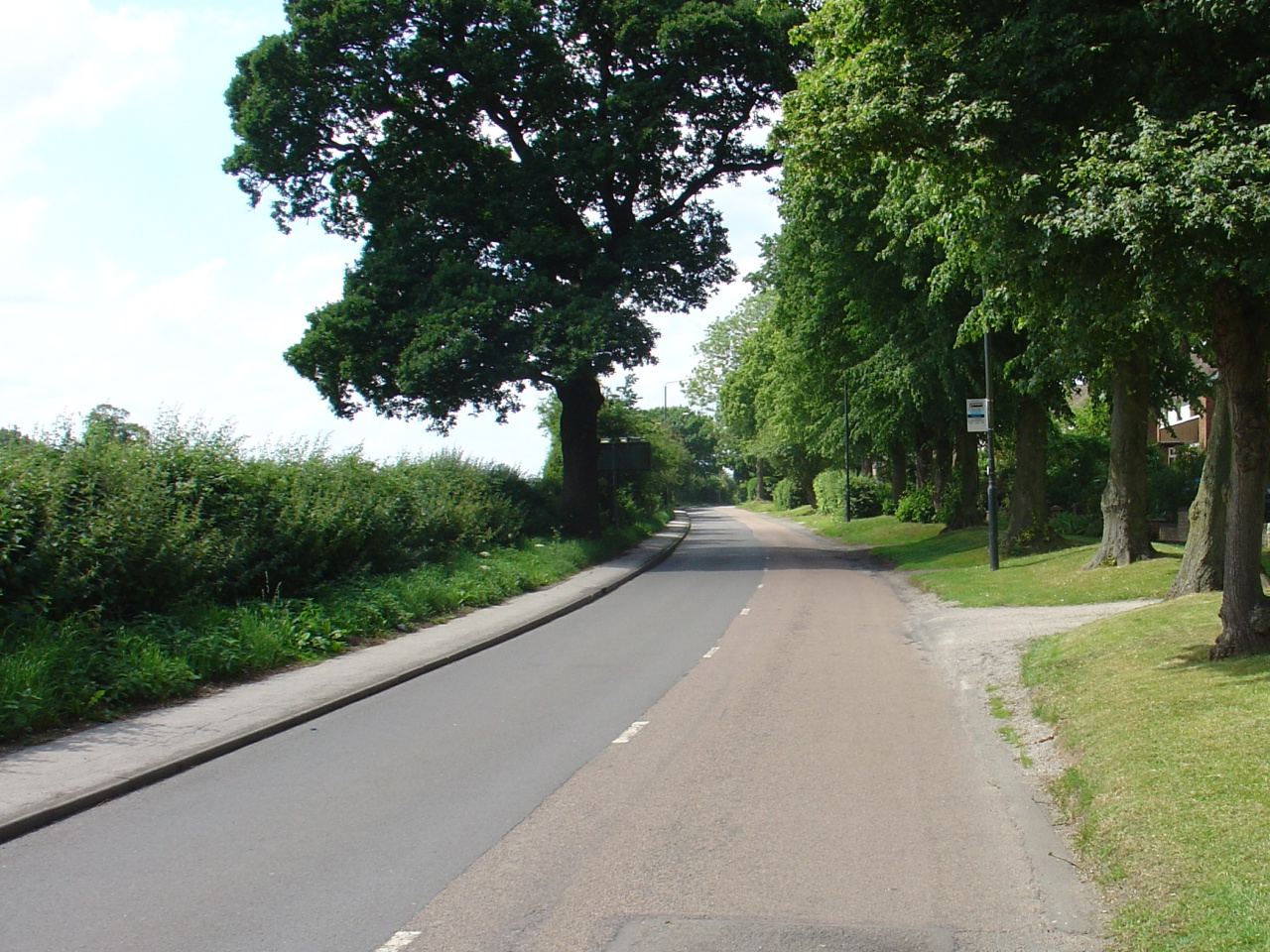
Green Lane, Finham

Finham is a civil parish and suburb of Coventry, England. It is located in the West Midlands region on the border of the West Midlands county and Warwick District. It lies approximately 2.3 miles (4 km) south of Coventry city centre, 3.3 miles (5 km) north-east of the centre of Kenilworth and 7 miles (11 km) north-east of the centre of Warwick.

Historically located entirely within the parish of Stoneleigh, the majority of the residences in Finham were transferred to the jurisdiction of Coventry City Council in 1974 as part of the local government reorganisation in 1974, though the parts of Finham that lie south of Green Lane and Howes Lane remain in the ceremonial county of Warwickshire. Finham shares the area and road of Green Lane along its northern boundary on the A45 with the suburb of Styvechale/Stivichall, and part of its southeastern boundary is shared with the village of Baginton in Warwickshire. The hamlet of King's Hill lies within a mile of Finham at Coventry's southernmost point and the village of Stoneleigh lies south of Finham where St Martins Road meets the Finham Brook. Finham Parish Council was created on 1 April 2016.

Finham is one of Coventry's most prosperous districts, especially the area east of Leamington Road and is popular with professionals working in Warwick, Leamington Spa and Kenilworth.

Finham is roughly triangular in shape; its northern boundary is along the Kenpas Highway (A45); its southeastern boundary is along the A46, and its southwestern boundary is, for the most part, along Green Lane. Finham Park School and Finham Primary School, are the two schools in Finham.

== Education ==
A large comprehensive school Finham Park School, a Mathematics and Computer college and also a teacher training school, is situated on Green Lane. It was completed in 1970 on former farmland on the west side of Green Lane. Also located along Green Lane, is Finham Primary School, a which was moved to Green Lane from its previous location on Brentwood Avenue, also in Finham. The school was almost entirely rebuilt in the mid-1980s. There is a library that is open from Monday to Saturday.

== King's Hill proposed developments ==
In March 2009, a meeting was held at Finham Primary School to discuss the proposed housing developments in Finham, whereby a new housing estate would be built from Green Lane South adjacent to King's Hill hamlet, running parallel alongside the A46 up to the Stoneleigh Road. This development would fall under Warwickshire County, as it is just past the border of Coventry. The meeting raised important issues on the matter, from the increased volume of traffic which would cause major problems due to the surrounding roads not being able to accommodate this number of vehicles, to the lack of public transport networks available in the surrounding areas. It has caused major uproar with local residents, and a petition has begun in an attempt to stop the proposed plans, along with a new Finham Residents Association website.

On 26 March 2009, it became clear that the known demands from Warwick District Council could be dwarfed by an additional inability of Coventry Council to allocate 7,000 housing units within its boundary. Coventry has been given permission to place these 7,000 outside, but adjacent to its boundaries in the south and /or in the north.

It also became known that the proposed developments to expand Finham Park secondary school, and move the school further back to accommodate more pupils and car parking space, went on hold whilst the current King's Hill development planning is under review.

== St Martin-in-the-Fields church ==
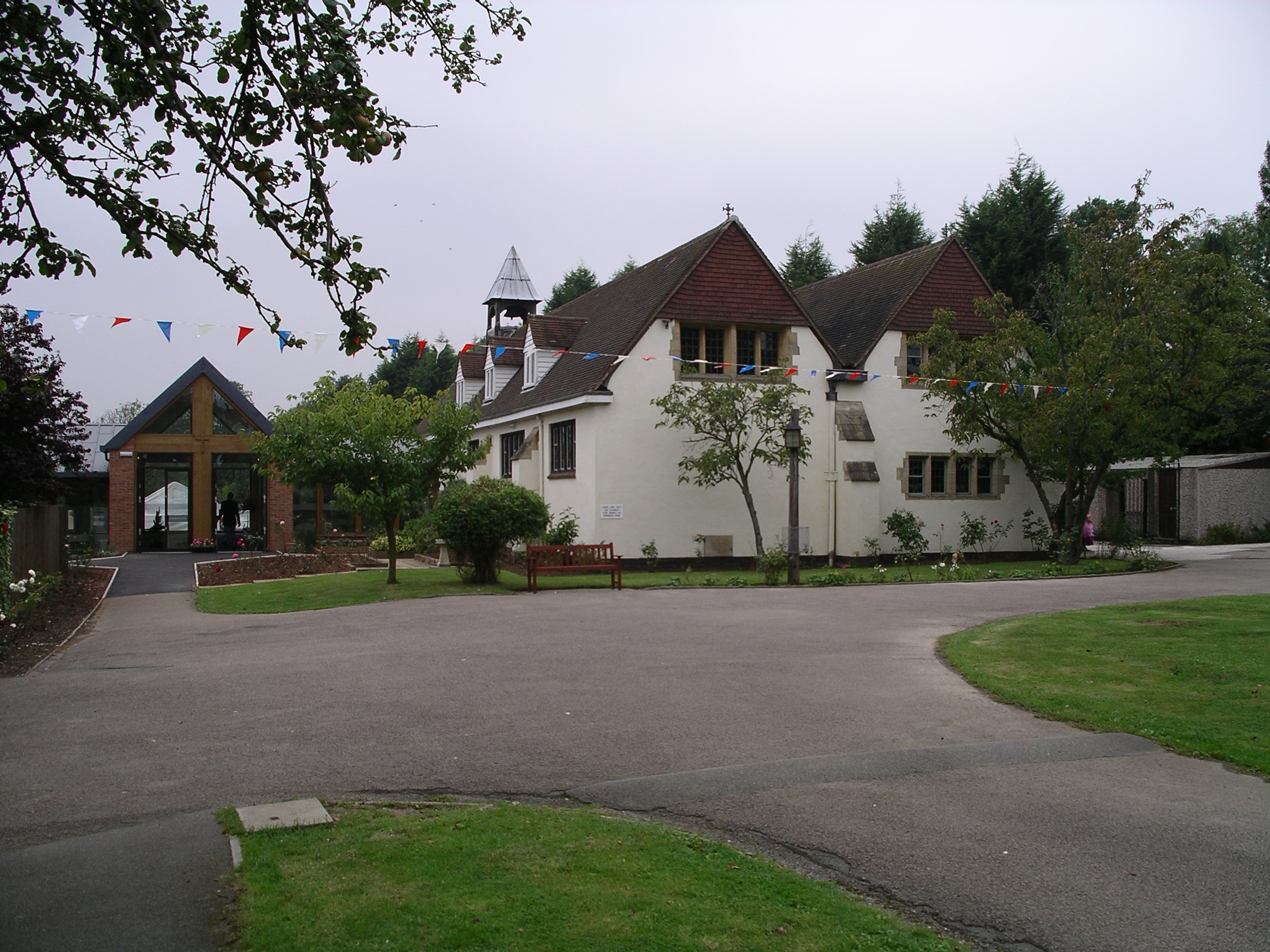
St Martin-in-the-Fields church, Green Lane, Finham, Coventry, on 17 September 2006 the day refurbishments were opened.

The Finham church, 'St Martin-in-the-Fields', was built in 1938 and is situated on Green Lane at the northwest extremity of Finham. It was recently refurbished and a hallway was built leading into the main church. The refurbished church and buildings were opened to the public on 17 September 2006.

== Places and geography in proximity ==
Finham Sewage Treatment Works, operated by Severn Trent Water, is located within the Warwickshire portion of Finham nearby to location of the ancient Finham hamlet where the River Sowe and Finham Brook meet. The works were used in the 1969 film The Italian Job starring Michael Caine. The underground concrete piping, then the widest of its kind in Europe, was used for the iconic scenes where several Minis raced through the tunnels of Turin. Adjacent to the sewerage works is Coventry Golf Club.

== Notable local organisations ==
A micronation known as Central Mercia is based in Finham. It is often described as a localised organisation
