= Charles Everett (cricketer) =

English cricketer

Personal information
- Full name: Charles Henry Everett
- Born: Chiddingfold, Surrey
- Relatives: Herbert Stewart (Brother-in-law), William Stewart (Brother-in-law)

Domestic team information
- Years: Team
- 1861: Hampshire

Career statistics
Competition	FC
Matches	1
Runs scored	14
Batting average	7.00
100s/50s	–/–
Top score	12
Balls bowled	12
Wickets	–
Bowling average	–
5 wickets in innings	–
10 wickets in match	–
Best bowling	–
Catches/stumpings	–/–
- Source: Cricinfo, 6 February 2010

Charles Henry Everett (c. 1835 – 15 January 1896) was an English cricketer.

Everett was born at Chiddingfold, Surrey in 1835.

He played a single first-class match for Hampshire in 1861 against the Marylebone Cricket Club.

Everett died at Sidmouth, Devon on 15 January 1896.

== Family ==
Everett's brother-in-law, William Stewart represented Hampshire and Oxford University in first-class cricket. Everett's other brother-in-law, Herbert Stewart also represented Hampshire in first-class cricket.
