= Frederick Hill (cricketer) =

English cricketer and clergyman

Personal information
- Full name: Frederick Henry Hill
- Born: 29 November 1847; Bradfield, Berkshire, England
- Died: 28 July 1913 (aged 65); Kempston, Bedfordshire, England
- Batting: Right-handed
- Bowling: Right-arm roundarm medium

Domestic team information
- Years: Team
- 1867–1870: Oxford University
- 1871: Marylebone Cricket Club

Career statistics
Competition	First-class
Matches	11
Runs scored	360
Batting average	21.17
100s/50s	–/2
Top score	73
Balls bowled	666
Wickets	9
Bowling average	30.00
5 wickets in innings	–
10 wickets in match	–
Best bowling	2/2
Catches/stumpings	9/–
- Source: Cricinfo, 9 May 2020

Frederick Henry Hill (29 November 1847 – 28 July 1913) was an English first-class cricketer and clergyman.

The son of Edward Hill, he was born in July 1913 at Bradfield, Berkshire. He educated in the village at Bradfield College, before going up to Oriel College, Oxford. While studying at Oxford, he played first-class cricket for Oxford University, making his debut against Southgate in 1867. He played first-class cricket for Oxford until 1870, making ten appearances. Hill scored a total of 300 runs in his ten matches for Oxford, at an average of 20.00 and a high score of 73. With his right-arm roundarm medium bowling, he took 9 wickets with best figures of 2 for 2. In addition to playing first-class cricket for Oxford, he also made a single appearance for the Marylebone Cricket Club (MCC) against Cambridge University at Fenner's in 1871, top-scoring with 59 runs in the MCC second innings.

After graduating from Oxford, Hill was briefly employed as an assistant master at Bromsgrove School, before taking holy orders in the Church of England in 1873. His first ecclesiastical post was as curate of Hawkchurch, Devon in 1873, before becoming an acting chaplain at Riga in 1875, then in the Russian Empire. By 1878, he was the domestic chaplain to the Earl of Zetland, a position he held until he became the vicar of Redcar in 1885. In 1887, he became the vicar of Cranfield in Bedfordshire, a post he retained until 1903. Hill died suddenly while visiting Kempston in July 1913.
