= George Jeffery (cricketer) =

English cricketer

George Ernest Jeffery (9 February 1853 – 8 April 1891) was an English cricketer active from 1872 to 1874 who played for Sussex. He was born in Eastbourne and died in Streatham Common. He appeared in 31 first-class matches as a righthanded batsman who bowled roundarm slow. He scored 808 runs with a highest score of 127 and took 68 wickets with a best performance of eight for 44.

Jeffery was educated at Rugby School and Trinity College, Cambridge. He was admitted to Lincoln's Inn in 1873 before graduating LLB in 1875. He was called to the Bar in 1878.
