= Samuel Butler (cricketer) =

English cricketer

Samuel Evan Butler (15 April 1850 – 30 April 1903) was an English cricketer who attended St Alban Hall and Brasenose College, Oxford. In the University Match of 1871 he took all ten Cambridge University wickets in their first innings, the only time this has been achieved in the fixture, and (as of April 2024) the only time an Oxford bowler has taken ten wickets in any first-class innings.

== Life ==
He was born at Colombo in British Ceylon, the eldest son of Samuel Butler, who bought Combe Hay Manor in 1864. He was educated at Eton College, where he was in the cricket XI. He matriculated in 1869 at St Alban Hall, Oxford, and graduated B.A. in 1875 at Brasenose College. He graduated M.A. in 1876 and the same year was called to the bar at the Inner Temple.

Butler resided at Caisson House near Combe Hay Manor, and from around 1881 had a fuller's earth mine nearby. He married in 1884 Florence Grosvenor, third daughter of the Rev. Frederick Grosvenor, rector of Dunkerton, Somerset. He died at Combe Hay, Somerset on 30 April 1903 aged 53.

== Cricketer ==
Butler's first-class career lasted only from 1870 to 1874; after leaving Oxford in 1873 he played in only two further first-class matches, both in 1874. 16 of his 21 matches were played for Oxford, the remainder being for various "Gentlemen" sides. He was a right-arm roundarm fast bowler and a right-handed batsman. Wisden says that he "possessed great pace". He took 106 wickets in his career at an average of 14.33, ten times taking five wickets or more in an innings and three times ten or more in a match. He was a negligible batsman, managing 256 runs at an average of 9.14, with a highest score of only 31.

Having taken all ten Cambridge University wickets in their first innings of the University Match of 1871, Butler captured five more wickets in their second innings, for 15 in the match, and assisting Oxford University to win by eight wickets. His figures were 10/38 and 5/57. His Wisden obituary says of him: "On that one afternoon at Lord's he was unplayable, but he never afterwards approached the same form."

On the strength of his performance in the 1871 University Match, Butler was chosen for the Gentlemen against the Players that year both at Lord's and the Oval, but he did nothing of note with the ball and made a duck in all three of his innings.

In the 1873 University Match, Butler took 5/48 in Cambridge's first innings, helping Oxford to win a close match by three wickets.
