= The University Match =

Annual cricketing fixture

- First meeting: 4 June 1827
- Latest meeting: 4 July 2023

Statistics
- Total meetings: 180 (incl. 1 abandoned and 5 non f-c)
- All-time series: 62–59–58, Cambridge

The University Match is an annual cricket fixture between Oxford University Cricket Club and Cambridge University Cricket Club. First played in 1827, it is the oldest varsity match in the world. (Note: The oldest sporting rivalry between two schools is the Eton v Harrow cricket match, which first took place in 1805.)

Until 2001, when first-class cricket was reorganised, the University Match was a three-day first-class fixture, played at Lord's. Subsequently, it was replaced with a one-day University Match played at Lord's and a four-day first-class fixture played alternately at Fenner's and The Parks. The 2021 one-day match was the last to be played at Lord's and, from 2022, the one-day University Match has been played at Arundel Castle. One-off twenty-over matches for men and women were arranged at Lord's in 2022. In February 2022, the MCC announced that, from 2023, the twenty-over fixtures would no longer be held at Lord's. Following opposition from a section of its membership, the club decided that the twenty-over matches would continue to be held at Lord's in 2023 to allow time for further consultation. In March 2023, it was announced that the twenty-over fixture would continue to be played at Lord's until at least 2027, following which there would be a review and a possible vote in 2028 on whether the matches should remain at Lord's.

These twenty-over matches are not to be confused with the 'University Matches' for which colours are awarded. Cambridge award a blue for both the one-day and four-day games and Oxford award a blue for the four-day game only. Blues are not awarded for the twenty-over match. At the same time, Oxford players have also played in the Oxford University Centre of Cricketing Excellence (Oxford UCCE, also including Oxford Brookes University, now superseded by the Oxford MCCU), and Cambridge players in the Cambridge University Centre of Cricketing Excellence (Cambridge UCCE, including Anglia Ruskin University and now the Cambridge MCCU). However, only those at Oxford and Cambridge Universities are eligible to play in the University Match(es).

The four-day match lost its first-class status after the 2020 fixture.

== History ==
The match was first played in 1827, at Lord's, at the instigation of Charles Wordsworth, making it the oldest intercollegiate sporting event in the world. Wordsworth was also responsible for founding The Boat Race in 1829.

The next two University matches were in 1829 and 1836. From 1838 it has been played annually, except for the war years of 1915–1918 and 1940–45. (From 1941 to 1945, a one-day fixture was played at Lord's, but these matches are not counted in the official records.) Lord's was to become its permanent venue from 1851 to 2000, but five of the early matches were played in the vicinity of Oxford.

It was traditionally an annual three-day first-class fixture. From the 1830s until 1939, it was among the most important fixtures of the season, attracting large crowds and widespread press coverage. Over three hundred thousand people watched the university match between 1871 and 1887. It was still a major social, as well as sporting, event as recently as just after World War II . According to The Cricketer (1954), the 1954 match attracted over 13,000 paying spectators as well as MCC members.

In terms of the clubs concerned, the University Match was the oldest first-class fixture still being played in 2020, its final year with first-class status. Matches between county teams prior to formation of the current county clubs have a longer history, with the oldest known county fixture between Kent and Surrey, which dates back to 1709 at least.

Despite never matriculating, Tom Wills was allowed to play for Cambridge in the 1856 match. He went on to found Australian rules football and coach the first Australian cricket team to tour England.

Some of the most dramatic matches in the long history of the fixture occurred in the 1870s. The first of these was 'Cobden's Match' in 1870. F. C. Cobden took the last three Oxford wickets in consecutive balls to give Cambridge victory by 2 runs. The following year S. E. Butler took 10–38 in the Cambridge first innings (the only instance of a bowler taking all ten), followed by five more wickets in the second innings. In 1873 Oxford won by only three wickets. The 1875 match was almost as close an affair as that in 1870. Needing 175 to win, Cambridge were 161–7 at one point, but were all out for 168 to lose by six runs.

Another notable match was in 1923, which became known as the "Thunderstorm match". Oxford had run up a good score, and a torrential storm for much of the night rendered the pitch almost unplayable, so that Cambridge were quickly dismissed in two innings.

William Yardley of Cambridge has the distinction of scoring the first two hundreds made in the series: 100 in 1870 in Cobden's Match and 130 in 1872.

Robin Marlar's bowling figures for Cambridge are worth noting:

- 1951: 5–41 and 1–64
- 1952: 7–104 and 2–25
- 1953: 5–94 and 7–49

Players who became (or in a few instances were already) famous to have appeared in the match include: Alfred Lyttelton (Cantab. 1876–9), Allan Steel (Cantab. 1878–81), Stanley Jackson (Cantab. 1890–3), C. B. Fry (Ox. 1892–5), K. S. Ranjitsinhji (Cantab. 1893), Pelham Warner (Ox. 1895–6), Gilbert Jessop (Cantab. 1896–9), R. E. Foster (Ox. 1897–1900), Bernard Bosanquet (Ox. 1898–1900), Percy Chapman (Cantab. 1920–2), Douglas Jardine (Ox. 1920–1, 1923), Gubby Allen (Cantab. 1922–3), K. S. Duleepsinhji (Cantab. 1925–8), Nawab of Pataudi snr (Ox. 1929–31), Ken Farnes (Cantab. 1931–3), Martin Donnelly (Ox. 1946–7), Abdul Kardar (Ox. 1947–9), Peter May (Cantab. 1950–2), David Sheppard (Cantab. 1950–2), Colin Cowdrey (Ox. 1952–4), M. J. K. Smith (Ox. 1954–6), Ted Dexter (Cantab. 1956–8), Nawab of Pataudi jnr (Ox. 1960–1, 1963), Tony Lewis Cantab 1960–62), Mike Brearley (Cantab. 1961–4), Majid Khan (Cantab. 1971–3), Imran Khan (Ox. 1973–5) and Mike Atherton (Cantab. 1987, 1989). It can be seen that the majority were batsmen rather than bowlers and that the 1890s and 1950s to early 1960s were particularly fertile periods. At the time of writing, the most recent Oxbridge international cricketers are Ed Smith (Cantab. 1996–7) in Tests, and James Dalrymple (Ox. 2001–3) in limited-overs internationals.

From 2001 the match has been replaced by two fixtures each year: a one-day match played at Lord's and a four-day fixture (first-class up to and including 2020) played in alternate years at Fenner's in Cambridge and The Parks in Oxford. Blues are awarded to those appearing in either match for Cambridge players but only to Oxford players who appear in the four-day game. Unless otherwise stated, statistics quoted in this article are for the first-class fixtures only.

In 2008, for the first time a Twenty20 fixture was also played.

The 2020 four-day match was delayed until September because of the COVID-19 pandemic.

== Records ==
=== Results ===
Up to and including 2020, 176 first-class matches were scheduled. Cambridge won 61, Oxford won 58, 56 were drawn and one match (in 1988) was abandoned without a ball being bowled. From 2021, whilst no longer first-class, the four-day University Match has been played under first-class conditions. Cambridge has won 1, Oxford 1 with 3 draws.

The one-day University Match has been scheduled on 24 occasions (as of 2025). Cambridge won 9, Oxford won 13 and three have been abandoned.

List of university matches
No.	Date	Venue	Winners	Winning margin	Notes
1	4 June 1827	Lord's	Drawn		2-day match; no play on final day
2	5 June 1829	Magdalen Ground, Oxford	Oxford	115 runs	2-day match
3	23 June 1836	Lord's	Oxford	121 runs	2-day match
4	6 July 1838	Lord's	Oxford	98 runs	2-day match
5	17 June 1839	Lord's	Cambridge	innings and 125 runs	2-day match; GB Lee took 9 of the 10 Cambridge wickets; the Oxford bowlers conceded 46 wides; Oxford batted one man short in both innings.
6	8 July 1840	Lord's	Cambridge	63 runs	2-day match
7	14 July 1841	Lord's	Cambridge	8 runs	
8	9 June 1842	Lord's	Cambridge	162 runs	2-day match
9	8 June 1843	Bullingdon Green, Oxford	Cambridge	54 runs	2-day match; originally scheduled for Magdalen Ground
10	4 July 1844	Lord's	Drawn		2-day match
11	12 June 1845	Lord's	Cambridge	6 wickets	2-day match Stephen Rippingall took 10 wickets in the match for Cambridge
12	11 June 1846	Magdalen Ground, Cowley Marsh, Oxford	Oxford	3 wickets	2-day match
13	17 June 1847	Lord's	Cambridge	138 runs	2-day match
14	15 June 1848	Magdalen Ground, Cowley Marsh, Oxford	Oxford	23 runs	2-day match
15	21 June 1849	Lord's	Cambridge	3 wickets	2-day match
16	6 June 1850	Magdalen Ground, Cowley Marsh, Oxford	Oxford	127 runs	
17	3 July 1851	Lord's	Cambridge	innings and 4 runs	2-day match
18	8 July 1852	Lord's	Oxford	innings and 77 runs	2-day match; Cambridge only had 10 men
19	15 June 1853	Lord's	Oxford	innings and 19 runs	2-day match
20	3 July 1854	Lord's	Oxford	innings and 8 runs	2-day match
21	21 June 1855	Lord's	Oxford	3 wickets	
22	16 June 1856	Lord's	Cambridge	3 wickets	completed in two days
23	25 June 1857	Lord's	Oxford	81 runs	
24	21 June 1858	Lord's	Oxford	innings and 38 runs	completed in two days; Cambridge all out for 39, their lowest total in the series
25	23 June 1859	Lord's	Cambridge	28 runs	completed in two days
26	25 June 1860	Lord's	Cambridge	3 wickets	completed in two days
27	17 June 1861	Lord's	Cambridge	133 runs	
28	23 June 1862	Lord's	Cambridge	8 wickets	completed in two days
29	22 June 1863	Lord's	Oxford	8 wickets	completed in two days; Oxford's Arthur Teape took 6–19 in the Cambridge first-innings
30	13 June 1864	Lord's	Oxford	4 wickets	completed in two days
31	26 June 1865	Lord's	Oxford	114 runs	completed in two days
32	18 June 1866	Lord's	Oxford	12 runs	completed in two days
33	1 July 1867	Lord's	Cambridge	5 wickets	completed in two days
34	22 June 1868	Lord's	Cambridge	168 runs	
35	21 June 1869	Lord's	Cambridge	58 runs	completed in two days
36	27 June 1870	Lord's	Cambridge	2 runs	completed in two days; "Cobden's Match" – F.C. Cobden took the last 3 Oxford wickets in consecutive balls to win the match; W Yardley scored 100 for Cambridge, the first hundred made in the series
37	26 June 1871	Lord's	Oxford	8 wickets	completed in two days; S.E. Butler took all ten wickets in Cambridge first innings and 15 in the match
38	24 June 1872	Lord's	Cambridge	innings and 166 runs	completed in two days; W Yardley scored 130 for Cambridge
39	23 June 1873	Lord's	Oxford	3 wickets	completed in two days
40	29 June 1874	Lord's	Oxford	innings and 92 runs	completed in two days
41	28 June 1875	Lord's	Oxford	6 runs	
42	26 June 1876	Lord's	Cambridge	9 wickets	WS Patterson scored 105* for Cambridge
43	25 June 1877	Lord's	Oxford	10 wickets	completed in two days; FM Buckland scored 117 not out for Oxford
44	1 July 1878	Lord's	Cambridge	238 runs	AG Steel 8–62 & 5–11 for Cambridge; completed in two days; Oxford all out 32 in their 2nd innings, the lowest total in the series by either side.
45	30 June 1879	Lord's	Cambridge	9 wickets	AG Steel completed hat-trick for Cambridge
46	28 June 1880	Lord's	Cambridge	115 runs	completed in two days; PH Morton completed hat-trick in Oxford's 1st innings
47	27 June 1881	Lord's	Oxford	135 runs	WH Patterson carried his bat in scoring 107* for Oxford in their 2nd innings
48	26 June 1882	Lord's	Cambridge	7 wickets	GB Studd 120 for Cambridge; CT Studd took 7–54 and 2–48 and scored 0 and 69; but JEK Studd achieved nothing of note
49	25 June 1883	Lord's	Cambridge	7 wickets	CW Wright 102 for Cambridge
50	30 June 1884	Lord's	Oxford	7 wickets	completed in two days
51	29 June 1885	Lord's	Cambridge	7 wickets	C Toppin 7–51 and HW Bainbridge 101, both for Cambridge
52	5 July 1886	Lord's	Oxford	133 runs	KJ Key and W Rashleigh put on 243 for the first wicket in Oxford's 2nd innings, scoring 143 and 107 respectively; no one else reached double figures and the innings ended at 304; in these pre-declaration days this collapse could have been deliberate
53	4 July 1887	Lord's	Oxford	7 wickets	Lord GW Scott scored 100 for Oxford. E Crawley scored 103* for Cambridge
54	2 July 1888	Lord's	Drawn		no play on 1st and 4th(!) day of match; AHJ Cochrane 6–62 for Oxford
55	1 July 1889	Lord's	Cambridge	innings and 105 runs	completed in two days; SMJ Woods 6–42 and 5–40, HJ Morduant 127, both for Cambridge
56	30 June 1890	Lord's	Cambridge	7 wickets	Oxford 42 and 108; Cambridge 97 and 54–3
57	29 June 1891	Lord's	Cambridge	2 wickets	completed in two days; after making Oxford follow on, Cambridge struggled to 93–8 to win
58	30 June 1892	Lord's	Oxford	5 wickets	MR Jardine 140 and VT Hill 114 for Oxford; following on, Cambridge made 388 (EC Streatfeild 116)
59	3 July 1893	Lord's	Cambridge	266 runs	completed in two days; Oxford 64 all out in their second innings
60	2 July 1894	Lord's	Oxford	8 wickets	C B Fry 100* for Oxford
61	4 July 1895	Lord's	Cambridge	134 runs	HK Foster 121 out of 196 in Oxford 2nd innings
62	2 July 1896	Lord's	Oxford	4 wickets	JC Hartley 8–161 for Oxford; GO Smith 132 in Oxford second innings; Oxford won despite a deficit of 117 on the first innings, scoring 330–6 in their second; WG Grace jnr made a "pair" for Cambridge
63	5 July 1897	Lord's	Cambridge	179 runs	GL Jessop 6–65 for Cambridge; PHE Cunliffe 6–101 for Oxford
64	30 June 1898	Lord's	Oxford	9 wickets	CEM Wilson 115 for Cambridge; A Eccles 109 for Oxford
65	3 July 1899	Lord's	Drawn		BJT Bosanquet 7–89 for Oxford; Cambridge were set 299 to win in 160 minutes but fell 70 short with 4 wickets down; Jessop's 46 took only 30 minutes
66	5 July 1900	Lord's	Drawn		Oxford made 503 (430–8 on Day 1); with RE Foster scoring 171; Cambridge replied with 392
67	4 July 1901	Lord's	Drawn		ER Wilson 118 for Cambridge; Oxford slumped to 82–6 in their second innings, but recovered to 177–7 to save the match thanks to their opener CHB Marsham making 100 not out
68	3 July 1902	Lord's	Cambridge	5 wickets	Cambridge reached 274–5 in their 2nd innings thanks to SH Day's 117 not out; in Oxford's 1st innings, they collapsed from 118 when the 1st wicket fell to 206 all out, with EM Dowson and ER Wilson each taking 5 wickets
69	2 July 1903	Lord's	Oxford	268 runs	JE Raphael 130, WHB Evans 7–52 and 4–34 for Oxford
70	30 June 1904	Lord's	Drawn		JF Marsh 172* as opener in Cambridge 2nd innings out of 390-8d; Oxford were 128–6 in their 2nd innings, but recovered to 221–6 to save the game, thanks to WHB Evans' 86*
71	6 July 1905	Lord's	Cambridge	40 runs	Cambridge 101 behind on 1st innings; LG Colbeck 107 in Cambridge 2nd innings; Oxford 123 all out in their 2nd inngs, with AF Morcom taking 6–41
72	5 July 1906	Lord's	Cambridge	94 runs	RA Yound 150 for Cambridge; NR Udal 7–133 for Oxford
73	4 July 1907	Lord's	Cambridge	5 wickets	HA Gilbert took 6–36 in Cambridge's 1st innings of 108 (in reply to 141); Oxford managed only 112 in their 2nd innings
74	6 July 1908	Lord's	Oxford	2 wickets	E Olivier 6–68 in Oxford's 1st innings; in Oxford's 2nd innings they were 125–7 but recovered to 183–8 to win, though Olivier took 4 more wickets
75	5 July 1909	Lord's	Drawn		rain affected; HA Gilbert 6–52 for Oxford
76	4 July 1910	Lord's	Oxford	innings and 126 runs	completed in two days; PR le Couteur 160, 6–20 and 5–46 for Oxford
77	3 July 1911	Lord's	Oxford	74 runs	JF Ireland completed hat-trick in Oxford's 1st innings, finishing with 5–25; in the Oxford 2nd innings a middle-order collapse put them in danger of defeat, but they recovered through 84 by H Brougham; PR le Couteur took 8–99 in Cambridge's 2nd innings (and 11 wickets in the match)
78	8 July 1912	Lord's	Cambridge	3 wickets	in a match that was close throughout, the scores were tied on 1st innings
79	7 July 1913	Lord's	Cambridge	4 wickets	BGV Melle took 6–70 in the Cambridge 1st innings
80	6 July 1914	Lord's	Oxford	194 runs	Cambridge all out 73 in their 2nd innings
81	7 July 1919	Lord's	Oxford	45 runs	M Howell 170 for Oxford; AER Gilligan 6–52 in Oxford 2nd innings; FCG Naumann 6–81 in Cambridge 2nd innings
82	5 July 1920	Lord's	Drawn		no play on first day; play extended by one day, but the weather was so bad that there was not even a result on 1st innings CS Marriott 7–69 in Oxford 1st innings
83	4 July 1921	Lord's	Cambridge	innings and 24 runs	H. Ashton 118 for Cambridge; CS Marriott 5–44 in Oxford 1st innings
84	10 July 1922	Lord's	Cambridge	innings and 100 runs	APF Chapman 102* for Cambridge; GOB Allen 5–60 and 4–18 for Cambridge
85	9 July 1923	Lord's	Oxford	innings and 227 runs	"Thunderstorm match" completed in two days after torrential rain all night after Oxford's innings; CH Taylor 109 for Oxford; Cambridge 59 all out in their 1st innings, GTA Stevens taking 6–20; RHB Bettington took 3–19 and 8–66
86	7 July 1924	Lord's	Cambridge	9 wickets	HJ Enthoven 104 in Cambridge 1st innings; PA Wright 6–49 in Oxford 2nd innings
87	6 July 1925	Lord's	Drawn		HJ Enthoven 129 in Cambridge 1st innings
88	5 July 1926	Lord's	Cambridge	34 runs	RGH Lowe completed hat-trick for Cambridge, finishing with 5–22
89	4 July 1927	Lord's	Cambridge	116 runs	AK Judd 124 in Cambridge 2nd innings; ERT Holmes 113 in Oxford 2nd innings
90	9 July 1928	Lord's	Drawn		CKH Hill-Wood 6–79 in Cambridge 1st innings; RWV Robins 101* in Cambridge 2nd innings Oxford survived with 9 wickets down in their 2nd innings
91	8 July 1929	Lord's	Drawn		JT Morgan 149 in Cambridge 1st innings; Nawab of Pataudi snr 106 in Oxford 1st innings and 84 in the 2nd
92	7 July 1930	Lord's	Cambridge	205 runs	IAR Peebles 7–75 in Cambridge 1st innings and 6–162 in the 2nd, in which ET Killick made 136
93	7 July 1931	Lord's	Oxford	8 wickets	Cambridge made 385 (A Ratcliffe 201, RSG Scott 6–64); Oxford replied with 453-8d (Nawab of Pataudi snr 238*); Cambridge collapsed to 122 all out in their 2nd innings (EM Wellings 5–25)
94	4 July 1932	Lord's	Drawn		DR Wilcox 157 and A Ratcliffe 124 in Cambridge 1st innings; BW Hone 167 in Oxford 1st innings
95	10 July 1933	Lord's	Drawn		a low-scoring affair, but poor weather prevented any chance of a result
96	9 July 1934	Lord's	Drawn		DCH Townsend 193 and FGH Chalk 108 in Oxford 1st innings; JGW Davies, the 7th bowler tried, took 5–43, the last 5 wickets falling while the score advanced from 406 to 415; AW Allen scored 115 in the Cambridge 1st innings
97	8 July 1935	Lord's	Cambridge	195 runs	JH Cameron took 7–73 in the Oxford 1st innings; Oxford 109 all out in their 2nd innings
98	6 July 1936	Lord's	Cambridge	8 wickets	Oxford followed on but narrowly avoided an innings defeat; JM Brocklebank took 4–47 and 6–92 for Cambridge
99	5 July 1937	Lord's	Oxford	7 wickets	NWD Yardley 101 in Cambridge 1st innings; JN Grover 121 in Oxford 1st innings
100	2 July 1938	Lord's	Drawn		GE Hewan 6–91 in Oxford 1st innings; PA Gibb 122 in Cambridge 1st innings; rain on the third day delayed play until 4pm; Oxford finished the match only 18 runs on with 4 wickets left
101	1 July 1939	Lord's	Oxford	45 runs	Cambridge were 156 behind on 1st innings but were not asked to follow on; Cambridge, set 430 to win by Oxford's declaration, managed 384 after being 249–8, thanks to PJ Dickinson (100) and J Webster (60)
102	6 July 1946	Lord's	Oxford	6 wickets	Martin Donnelly 142 in Oxford 1st innings
103	5 July 1947	Lord's	Drawn		HA Pawson 135 in Oxford 1st innings; Cambridge forced to follow on, but comfortably saved the game
104	3 July 1948	Lord's	Oxford	innings and 8 runs	PA Whitcombe 7–51 in Cambridge 1st innings; HE Webb 145* for Oxford; CB van Ryneveld 7–57 in Cambridge 2nd innings
105	2 July 1949	Lord's	Cambridge	7 wickets	Oxford followed on
106	8 July 1950	Lord's	Drawn		much of the 2nd day lost to rain
107	7 July 1951	Lord's	Oxford	21 runs	a low-scoring game; Cambridge reached 197–8 in their second innings, needing 22 more runs to win, but both the last two wickets fell at that score; RV Divecha took 7–62
108	5 July 1952	Lord's	Drawn		Robin Marlar 7–104 in Oxford 1st innings; David Sheppard made 127 for Cambridge, and they led by 136 on 1st innings; at 135–8 Oxford looked likely to lose, but they hung on for the draw at 179–9
109	4 July 1953	Lord's	Cambridge	2 wickets	Colin Cowdrey 116 in Oxford 1st innings, who led by 121; however Robin Marlar took 7–49 in their 2nd innings (following 5–94 in their 1st), and Cambridge scored 238–8 to win, thanks to DRW Silk's 116*
110	3 July 1954	Lord's	Drawn		MJK Smith 201* for Oxford; DRW Silk 118 for Cambridge; in their 2nd innings Cambridge had 8 wickets down at the game's end, HB Birrell taking 5–20
111	2 July 1955	Lord's	Drawn		
112	7 July 1956	Lord's	Drawn		
113	6 July 1957	Lord's	Cambridge	innings and 186 runs	G Goonesena 211 for Cambridge
114	12 July 1958	Lord's	Cambridge	99 runs	
115	11 July 1959	Lord's	Oxford	85 runs	
116	6 July 1960	Lord's	Drawn		Nawab of Pataudi 131 for Oxford; AR Lewis 95 for Cambridge
117	15 July 1961	Lord's	Drawn		
118	11 July 1962	Lord's	Drawn		AR Lewis 103*
119	13 July 1963	Lord's	Drawn		
120	8 July 1964	Lord's	Drawn		
121	7 July 1965	Lord's	Drawn		
122	9 July 1966	Lord's	Oxford	innings and 9 runs	
123	8 July 1967	Lord's	Drawn		David Toft 145 for Oxford
124	6 July 1968	Lord's	Drawn		
125	12 July 1969	Lord's	Drawn		
126	11 July 1970	Lord's	Drawn		Majid Khan 200 for Cambridge
127	10 July 1971	Lord's	Drawn		
128	1 July 1972	Lord's	Cambridge	innings and 25 runs	
129	7 July 1973	Lord's	Drawn		
130	6 July 1974	Lord's	Drawn		
131	5 July 1975	Lord's	Drawn		
132	30 June 1976	Lord's	Oxford	10 wickets	
133	29 June 1977	Lord's	Drawn		
134	28 June 1978	Lord's	Drawn		
135	4 July 1979	Lord's	Cambridge	innings and 52 runs	
136	28 June 1980	Lord's	Drawn		
137	20 June 1981	Lord's	Drawn		
138	26 June 1982	Lord's	Cambridge	7 wickets	
139	29 June 1983	Lord's	Drawn		
140	4 July 1984	Lord's	Oxford	5 wickets	
141	3 July 1985	Lord's	Drawn		GJ Toogood 149 and 8–52 (ten wickets in the match)
142	2 July 1986	Lord's	Cambridge	5 wickets	
143	1 July 1987	Lord's	Drawn		
(144a)	2 July 1988	Lord's	Abandoned		
144	5 July 1989	Lord's	Drawn		no play on final day
145	4 July 1990	Lord's	Drawn		
146	2 July 1991	Lord's	Drawn		
147	30 June 1992	Lord's	Cambridge	7 wickets	
148	30 June 1993	Lord's	Oxford	9 wickets	
149	29 June 1994	Lord's	Drawn		
150	5 July 1995	Lord's	Oxford	9 wickets	
151	2 July 1996	Lord's	Drawn		AC Ridley 155 and WS Kendall 145 for Oxford
152	2 July 1997	Lord's	Drawn		
153	1 July 1998	Lord's	Cambridge	91 runs	
154	25 June 1999	Lord's	Drawn		
155	11 July 2000	Lord's	Drawn		
156	30 June 2001	Cambridge	Oxford	3 wickets	MK Floyd 128 not out for Oxford
157	26 June 2002	Oxford	Drawn		Cambridge 604, to date Cambridge's highest team score in the series A Shankar 143 and JSD Moffat 169 for Cambridge; JWM Dalrymple 137 for Oxford
158	26 June 2003	Cambridge	Oxford	innings and 71 runs	JWM Dalrymple 236 not out and 5–49 (1st inns) and MK Munday 5–83 (2nd inns) for Oxford; SJ Marshall 126 not out for Cambridge completed in three days
159	28 June 2004	Oxford	Oxford	innings and 77 runs	JJ Sayers 147, DR Fox 104 and PJ McMahon 99 for Oxford completed in three days
160	28 June 2005	Cambridge	Oxford	innings and 213 runs	Oxford 610-5dec.; S Oberoi 247 for Oxford, to date the highest individual score in the series; Oberoi and DR Fox (184) put on 408 for the third wicket, the highest partnership in the fixture
161	3 July 2006	Oxford	Oxford	9 wickets	S Oberoi 115 and MK Munday 6–77 & 5–66 for Oxford
162	30 June 2007	Cambridge	Drawn		
163	1 July 2008	Oxford	Drawn		AS Ansari 193 & 80 not out and 4–50 (1st inns) and NMH Whittington 83 (1st inns) for Cambridge; EJ Morse 6–102 (1st inns) and N Kruger 172 for Oxford
164	7 July 2009	Cambridge	Cambridge	10 wickets	AS Ansari 132 (1st inns) and RMR Braithwaite 8–130 for Cambridge; N Kruger 98 (2nd inns) and R Sharma 5–96 for Oxford
165	6 July 2010	Oxford	Oxford	innings and 28 runs	DA King 189 (1st inns), SS Agarwal 117 (1st inns) & 5–78 (2nd inns), AS Sharma 189* (1st inns), DC Pascoe 5–38 (1st inns) and AJD Scott 8–147 (both inns) for Oxford; PH Hughes 74 & 87, A Ashok 93 (2nd inns) for Cambridge
166	5 July 2011	Cambridge	Cambridge	56 runs	PM Best 6–86 (2nd inns), ADJ Kennedy 5 dismissals (2nd innings) for Cambridge; R Sharma 114 (2nd inns) for Oxford
167	24 June 2012	Oxford	Drawn		
168	2 July 2013	Cambridge	Oxford	innings and 186 runs	SS Agarwal 313* (1st inns), TJ Williams 5–34 (1st inns) and 8–69 (match), SVS Mylavarapu 5–23 (1st inns) and 8–110 (match) for Oxford; PH Hughes 92 (2nd inns), TC Elliott 101 (2nd inns) for Cambridge completed in three days
169	30 June 2014	Oxford	Drawn		NJ Ferraby 107 and 69 for Oxford, AD Sears 5–73 (1st inns) for Cambridge
170	30 June 2015	Cambridge	Cambridge	5 wickets	MST Hughes 116 (2nd inns) for Oxford; AD Blofield 105 (1st inns), RJ Crichard 5–62 (1st inns), AR Patel 5–88 (2nd inns) for Cambridge completed in three days
171	5 July 2016	Oxford	Oxford	103 runs	MST Hughes 116 (1st inns), DA Escott 125 (2nd inns) & 6–71 (2nd inns), J Marsden 5–41 (1st inns) & 8–92 (match) for Oxford; AR Patel 5–86 (1st inns) for Cambridge
172	4 July 2017	Cambridge	Cambridge	216 runs	RJ Crichard 5–74 (1st inns) & 6–68 (2nd inns) for Cambridge
173	2 July 2018	Oxford	Oxford	9 wickets	MA Naylor 202 (1st inns), DA Escott 175 (1st inns), THS Pettman 5–41 (1st inns) & 8–113 (match) for Oxford
174	2 July 2019	Cambridge	Oxford	8 wickets	GT Hargrave 146 (1st inns), THS Pettman 5–19 (2nd inns) & 8–80 (match) for Oxford
175	3 September 2020	Cambridge	Cambridge	249 runs	PD Daneel 125 (2nd inns), JC Vitali 6–34 (1st inns) & 10–92 (match) for Cambridge; The final first-class University Match was delayed by two months because of the COVID-19 pandemic
176	7 July 2021	Teddington CC	Drawn		The first non-first-class University Match
177	5 July 2022	Oxford	Drawn		GT Hargrave 322* (1st inns), Joshua Royan 102 (1st inns) for Oxford; NP Taylor 126 (1st inns) for Cambridge
178	4 July 2023	Cambridge	Cambridge	176 runs	S R Sardana 4-37 and 6-84 match 10-121 (Cambridge)
179	3 July 2024	Oxford	Oxford	innings and 6 runs	T Brown 104* (1st inns), J Clarke 5-67 (2nd inns) for Oxford. Completed inside 3 days
180	1 July 2025	Cambridge	Drawn		M Kirkby 146 & 176, SF Choudhary 113 (1st inns), H Nicholls 99 & 96 (Oxford)

=== Highest and lowest scores by each side ===
- 604 Cambridge University v Oxford University, The Parks, 2002
- 611-5d Oxford University v Cambridge University, The Parks, 2010
- 39 Cambridge University v Oxford University, Lord's, 1858
- 32 Oxford University v Cambridge University, Lord's, 1878

=== Individual triple centuries ===
- 313* Sam Agarwal, Oxford, Fenner's, 2013 (also the highest first-class innings for Oxford University)

=== Individual double centuries ===
- 247 Salil Oberoi, Oxford, Fenner's, 2005
- 238* Nawab of Pataudi senior, Oxford, Lord's, 1931
- 236* Jamie Dalrymple, Oxford, Fenner's, 2003
- 211 G Goonesena, Cambridge, Lord's, 1957
- 202 Matthew Naylor, Oxford, The Parks, 2018
- 201* M. J. K. Smith, Oxford, Lord's, 1954
- 201 Alan Ratcliffe, Cambridge, Lord's, 1931
- 200 Majid Khan, Cambridge, Lord's, 1970

=== Century on first-class debut ===
- 185* AS Sharma, Oxford, The Parks, 2010
- 172 N Kruger, Oxford, The Parks, 2008
- 146 GT Hargrave, Oxford, Fenner's, 2019
- 125 DA Escott, Oxford, The Parks, 2016
- 116 MST Hughes, Oxford, Fenner's, 2015
- 112 Anand Ashok, Cambridge, Fenner's, 2009

=== Best innings bowling ===
- 10–38 SE Butler, Oxford, Lord's, 1871
- 9-? GB Lee, Oxford, Lord's, 1839
- 8–44 GE Jeffery, Cambridge, Lord's, 1873
- 8–52 GJ Toogood, Oxford, Lord's, 1985
- 8–62 AG Steel, Cambridge, Lord's, 1878
- 8–66 RHB Bettington, Oxford, Lord's, 1923
- 8–68 EM Kenney, Oxford, Lord's, 1868
- 8–99 PR Le Couteur, Oxford, Lord's, 1911
- 8–161 JC Hartley, Oxford, Lord's, 1896
- 8-? GE Yonge, Oxford, Lord's, 1845

=== Best match bowling ===
- 15–95 SE Butler, Oxford, Lord's, 1871
- 14–119 EM Kenney, Oxford, Lord's, 1868
- 13–73 AG Steel, Cambridge, Lord's, 1878

=== Hat-tricks ===
- FC Cobden, Cambridge, Lord's, 1870
- AG Steel, Cambridge, Lord's, 1879
- PH Morton, Cambridge, Lord's, 1880
- JF Ireland, Cambridge, Lord's, 1911
- RGH Lowe, Cambridge, Lord's, 1926

=== Match double (100 runs & 10 wickets) ===
- PR Le Couteur, Oxford, Lord's, 1910: 160 and 11–66
- GJ Toogood, Oxford, Lord's, 1985: 149 and 10–93

== See also ==
- Eton v Harrow
- Gentlemen v Players
- List of British and Irish varsity matches
- Oxbridge rivalry
