= Sam Agarwal =

Indian cricketer (born 1990)

Personal information
- Full name: Samridh Sunil Agarwal
- Born: 13 July 1990 (age 36); Agra, Uttar Pradesh, India
- Height: 5 ft 11 in (1.80 m)
- Batting: Right-handed
- Bowling: Right-arm off break

Domestic team information
- Years: Team
- 2010–2013: Oxford University
- 2010–2013: Oxford MCCU
- FC debut: 3 April 2010 Oxford MCCU v Northamptonshire
- Last FC: 2 July 2013 Oxford University v Cambridge University

Career statistics
Competition	First-class
Matches	13
Runs scored	899
Batting average	49.94
100s/50s	3/3
Top score	313*
Balls bowled	2000
Wickets	20
Bowling average	49.90
5 wickets in innings	1
10 wickets in match	0
Best bowling	5/78
Catches/stumpings	4/–
- Source: CricketArchive, 6 September 2013

Samridh Sunil "Sam" Agarwal (born 13 July 1990) is an Indian former cricketer who played for Oxford University and the associated Oxford MCCU. Born in Agra, Uttar Pradesh, India, he was educated at the all-boys Indian boarding school The Doon School in Dehradun before transferring to Millfield in Street, Somerset in England. He made his debut in first-class cricket in 2010. He bats right handed and bowls right arm offbreaks. In the opening round of first-class fixtures in 2013, he took 3-26 and scored 108 against the county champions, Warwickshire County Cricket Club. In the four-day varsity match at Cambridge during the 2013 season, Agarwal scored 313 not out from 312 balls, becoming the first player to record a triple century in inter-university matches, and breaking the record for the highest score by an Oxford player at first-class level.

He played a number of games for the Surrey 2nd XI following his stint at Oxford but was not contracted to the county. He did not qualify as a domestic player in England so found opportunities limited and returned to India but did not pursue a cricket career.
