= Block (surname) =

Block is a German, Dutch and English surname. Notable people with the surname include:

- Adam Block (disambiguation), list of multiple people
- Adriaen Block (1567–1627), Dutch trader and navigator
- Agnes Block (1629–1704), Dutch botanist and art collector
- Amanda Roth Block (1912–2011), American artist
- Anna Katharina Block (1642–1719), German painter
- Austin Block (born 1989), American ice hockey player
- Axel Block (born 1947), German cinematographer
- Barbara Block, American marine biologist
- Benjamin Block (1631–1690), German painter
- Bill Block (born 1954), American film producer
- Billy Block (1955–2015), American musical artist
- Bob Block (1921–2011), British scriptwriter
- Brandon Block (born 1967), British DJ
- Brett Ellen Block (born 1973), American novelist
- Bruce Block (born 1967), American entertainer
- Bruce A. Block, American film producer
- Bruno Block (1885–1937), American baseball player
- Carl Block (1874–1948), Swedish bishop
- Carson Block (born 1977), American businessman
- Cy Block (1919–2004), American baseball player
- Dan Block, American musician
- Daniel Block (1802–1853), American Jewish leader
- Daniel I. Block (born 1943), American scholar
- David Block (1908–2001), British army officer
- Dorothy Block (1904–1984), American artist
- Doug Block (born 1953), American filmmaker
- Eric Block (born 1942), American chemist
- Francesca Lia Block (born 1962), American writer
- Frank Block (American politician)
- Frank Block (Australian politician) (1899–1971), Australian politician
- Fred L. Block (born 1947), American sociologist
- Frederic Block (born 1934), American judge
- Gay Block (born 1942), American photographer
- Gene D. Block (born 1948), American biologist
- Gladys Block, American nutritionist
- Hal Block (1913–1981), American comedian
- Harlon Block (1924–1945), American Marine Corps corporal, one of six marines depicted in Raising the Flag on Iwo Jima
- Herbert Lawrence Block (1909–2001), American political cartoonist known as Herblock
- Hertha Block (1906–?), German librarian
- Holly Block (1958–2017), American museum and art gallery director
- Hunt Block (born 1954), American actor
- Ira Block (born 1949), American photographer
- Jack Block (1924–2010), American psychologist
- Jacob Block (1580–1646), Dutch painter
- James Block (born 1968), British canoer
- Jamie Block, American musician
- Jason Block (born 1989), Canadian swimmer
- Jay C. Block (born 1970), American politician
- Jeanne Block (1923–1981), American psychologist
- Jerzy Block (1904–1996), Polish actor and director
- Joachim Bloch (born 1973), German politician
- Joe Block (born 1978), American sports announcer
- Joel Block (born 1943), American psychologist
- Johannes Block (1894–1945), German army general
- John Block (disambiguation), list of multiple people
- John Rusling Block (born 1935), American government official
- Josef Block (1863–1943), German painter
- Julius H. Block (1860–1915), American politician
- Karl M. Block (1886–1958), American bishop
- Kelly Block (born 1961), Canadian politician
- Ken Block (disambiguation), list of multiple people
- Kieran Block (born 1985), Canadian hockey player
- King Block (1929–2014), American football coach
- Larry Block (1942–2012), American actor
- Lauren Block, American marketing academic
- Lawrence Block (born 1938), American crime writer
- Lawrence J. Block (born 1951), American judge
- Libbie Block (1910–1972), American writer
- Lynda Lyon Block (1948–2002), American murderer
- Lynne Block, Canadian politician
- Malú Block (1904–1989, born María Luisa Cabrera), Mexican artist
- Mark Block (born 1954), American political strategist
- Martin Block (1903–1967), American disc jockey
- Martin M. Block (1925–2016), American physicist
- Marty Block (born 1950), American politician
- Mathilde Block (1850–1932), German politician
- Maurice Block (1816–1901), German-French statistician and economist
- Melissa Block (born 1961), American radio host
- Melvin Block (1928–1985), American lawyer
- Michel Block (1937–2003), Belgian-French pianist
- Micky Block (1940–2019), English footballer
- Mike Block (born 1982), American musician
- Miriam Block (born 1990), German politician
- Mitchell Block (1950–2024), American filmmaker
- Ned Block (born 1942), American philosopher
- Nili Block (born 1995), Israeli kickboxer and Muay Thai fighter
- Noga Block (born 2004), Israeli rhythmic gymnast
- Paul Block (1877–1941), American newspaper publisher
- Peter Block (disambiguation), list of multiple people
- Priscilla Block (born 1995), American singer
- Ralph Block (1889–1974), American film producer
- Richard Earl Block (born 1931), American mathematician
- Ron Block (born 1964), American musician
- Rory Block (born 1949), American musician
- Rudolph Edgar Block (1870–1940), Jewish American journalist
- Ryan Block (born 1982), American technology entrepreneur
- Samuel Block (disambiguation), list of multiple people
- Sandy Block (1917–1985), American musician
- Sharon Block (politician) (born 1941), American politician
- Sharon Block (government official), American attorney, government official, labor policy advisor and law professor
- Sharon Block (scholar), American academic specializing in the history of race in early American history
- Sherman Block (1924–1998), American sheriff
- Sherry Block (born 1971), American archer
- Simon Block, British screenwriter and producer
- Spencer Block (1908–1979), English cricketer
- Stanley Block (born 1939), American academic
- Stefan Merrill Block (born 1982), American writer
- Stephanie J. Block (born 1972), American actress and singer
- Steven Block (born 1952), American biophysicist and Professor
- Stu Block (born 1977), Canadian singer and songwriter
- Stuart Block (born 1979), English cricketer
- Susan Block, American sexologist
- Vanessa Block, American film director, screenwriter and producer
- Walter Block (born 1941), American economist and author

== Fictional characters ==
- Mr. Block, American comics character created in 1912

== See also ==
- Blok (surname)
- Black (surname)
