= Bloch =

- Pronunciation: English: /blɒk/ German: [blɔx] Polish: [blɔx] French: [blɔk] Danish: [blɔɡ]
- Language: German

Origin
- Languages: 1. German; 2. Polish Jewish; 3. Polish
- Origin: 1. Block; 2. wƚoch 3. Bƚoch
- Derivation: 3. Bƚogosƚaw
- Meaning: 1. 'lump block' 2. 'foreigner' 3. 'happy'
- Region of origin: Central Europe

Other names
- Alternative spelling: Block

Bloch is a surname of German origin. Notable people with this surname include:

== A ==
- Adele Bloch-Bauer (1881–1925), Austrian entrepreneur
- Albert Bloch (1882–1961), American painter
- Alexandre Bloch (1857–1919), French painter
- Alfred Bloch (1878–1902), French footballer
- Aliza Bloch (born 1957), first female mayor of Bet Shemesh, Israel
- André Bloch (composer) (1873–1960), French composer and music educator
- André Bloch (mathematician) (1893–1948), French mathematician
- Andreas Bloch (1860–1917), Norwegian painter, illustrator and costume designer
- Andy Bloch (born 1969), American poker player
- Anna Bloch (1868–1953), Danish actress
- Armand Bloch (1866–1932), French sculptor
- Arthur Bloch (born 1948), American writer, author of Murphy's Law
- Augustyn Bloch (1929–2006), Polish composer and organist
- Avraham Yitzchak Bloch (1891–1941), Lithuanian rabbi

== B ==
- Bernard Bloch (linguist) (1907–1965), American linguist
- Bernard Bloch (actor) (born 1949), French actor
- Bianca Bloch (1848–1901), German author

== C ==
- Carl Heinrich Bloch (1834–1890), Danish painter
- Chaim Yitzchak Bloch Hacohen (1867–1948), Lithuanian-American rabbi
- Charles E. Bloch (1861–1940), American publisher
- Claude Bloch (1923–1971), French theoretical nuclear physicist
- Claude C. Bloch (1878–1967), American naval admiral

== D ==
- Darius Paul Bloch, birthname of Darius Paul Dassault (1882–1969), French Army general of Jewish origin, who adopted "Dassault" as nom de guerre during French Resistance service
- David Bloch-Blumenfeld (1880–1947), Israeli politician
- Débora Bloch (born 1963), Brazilian actress
- Denise Bloch (1916–1945), French Resistance member
- Dora Bloch, Israeli-British citizen murdered in 1976
- Dorete Bloch (1943–2015), Danish zoologist

== E ==
- Eduard Bloch (1872–1945), Austrian physician and family doctor of Adolf Hitler from 1903 to 1907
- Elisa Bloch (1848–1905), Silesian-French sculptor
- Emanuel Hirsch Bloch (1902–1954), American lawyer
- Ernest Bloch (1880–1959), Swiss-born American composer
- Ernst Bloch (1885–1977), German philosopher
- Erich Bloch (1925–2016), American electrical engineer and administrator
- Eugene Bloch (1878–1944), French physicist and professor

== F ==
- France Bloch-Sérazin (1913–1943), French Resistance member during World War II
- Felix Bloch (1905–1983), Swiss-American physicist
- Felix Bloch (diplomatic officer) (born 1935), American diplomat accused of spying for the Soviets

== G ==
- Gilles Bloch (born 1961), French researcher and neuroscientist
- Grete Bloch (1892–1944), German industrial employee, letter partner of Franz Kafka
- Gustave Bloch (1848–1923), French Jewish historian of ancient history

== H ==
- Hans Glad Bloch (1791–1865), Norwegian politician
- Harriet Bloch (1881–1975), Danish first female film screenwriter
- Heinz P. Bloch, American mechanical engineer
- Henry W. Bloch (1922–2019), American businessman and Kansas City philanthropist
- Herbert Bloch (1911–2006), German archaeologist and epigrapher
- Herbert J. Bloch (1907–1987), philatelist of New York City
- Herman S. Bloch (1912–1990), American chemist and an inventor

== I ==
- Immanuel Bloch (born 1972), German experimental physicist
- Isaac Bloch, French rabbi
- Isabelle Bloch, French computer scientist
- Iwan Bloch (1872–1922), Berlin dermatologist

== J ==
- Jacqueline Bloch (born 1967), French physicist
- Jan Gotlib Bloch (1836–1902), also known as Ivan Bloch, Polish banker and warfare expert
- Jean-Richard Bloch (1884–1947), French writer
- Jens Bloch (1761–1830), Danish theologian
- Joachim Bloch (born 1963), German politician
- Jocelyne Bloch (born 1971), Swiss neurosurgeon
- Jonas Bloch (born 1939), Brazilian actor
- Joseph Samuel Bloch (1850–1923), Austrian rabbi
- Joshua Bloch (born 1961), American software engineer
- Joshua Bloch (rabbi) (1890–1957), Lithuanian-American rabbi and librarian
- Jules Bloch (1880–1953), French linguist
- Julia Chang Bloch (born 1942), American diplomat

== K ==
- Karola Bloch (1905–1994), Polish-German architect, socialist, and feminist
- Konrad Emil Bloch (1912–2000), American biochemist
- Kurt Bloch (born 1960), American musician

== L ==
- Lars Bloch (1938–2022), Danish actor and producer
- Lloyd Bloch, a fictional character in Marvel Comics
- Lucienne Bloch (1909–1999), Swiss-American artist and photographer, daughter of Ernest Bloch

== M ==
- Marc Bloch (1886–1944), French historian
- Marcel Bloch, later Marcel Dassault (1892–1986), French aircraft industrialist, founder of the firm Société des Avions Marcel Bloch; he adopted his younger brother's (Darius Paul Bloch) nom de guerre
- Marcel Bloch (aviator) (1890–1938), French balloon buster ace
- Marcus Elieser Bloch (1723–1799), German medical doctor and naturalist
- Marjorie Bloch (born 1956), Irish painter
- Mark Bloch (linguist) (1924–2022), Russian linguist
- Mark Bloch (artist) (born 1956), American artist
- Maurice Bloch (born 1939), British anthropologist
- Maurice Bloch (politician) (1891–1929), New York assemblyman
- Meli Polishook-Bloch (born 1953), Israeli politician
- Michael Bloch (barrister) (born 1951), British barrister
- Michael Bloch (born 1953), British author and historian
- Mohammed Ibrahim Bloch (born 1949), Indian film director
- Moses Löb Bloch (1815–1909), Hungarian rabbi
- Moshe Rudolf Bloch (1902–1985), Israeli scientist

== N ==
- Noë Bloch (1875–1937), Russian-born film producer

== O ==
- Orville Emil Bloch (1915–1983), American military officer and Medal of Honor recipient

== P ==
- Paul Bloch (c. 1940–2018), American publicist
- Pedro Bloch (1914–2004), Brazilian writer
- Peter Rafael Bloch (1921–2008), German-American art historian, writer and journalist
- Pierrette Bloch (1928–2017), Swiss painter and textile artist

== R ==
- Ray Bloch (1902–1982), American composer, songwriter, and conductor
- Richard Bloch (1926–2004), American businessman
- Richard L. Bloch (1929–2018), American investor, real estate developer, banker, and philanthropist
- Richard Milton Bloch (1921–2000), pioneering American computer programmer
- Robert Bloch (1917–1994), American writer
- Robert Bloch (racing driver), French race car driver
- Rosa Bloch-Bollag (1880–1922), Swiss revolutionary Marxist activist
- Rosine Bloch (1844–1891), French operatic mezzo-soprano

== S ==
- Samson Bloch (1782–1845), Galician writer
- Scott Bloch, American lawyer and government official
- Scotty Bloch, American actress
- Sean Bloch (born 1973), South African Olympic cyclist
- Shani Bloch (born 1979), Israeli Olympic racing cyclist
- Shmaryahu Yitzchak Bloch (c. 1862–1923), English rabbi
- Sonny Bloch (c. 1937–1998), American radio show host
- Spencer Bloch (born 1944), American mathematician
- Stella Bloch (1897–1999), American artist, dancer and journalist
- Susan Bloch (1940–1982), American theatrical press agent
- Suzanne Bloch (1907–2002), Swiss-American musician and an influential pioneer of Early Music Revival during the 20th century

== T ==
- Thomas Bloch (born 1962), French classical musician

== W ==
- Waldemar Bloch (1906–1984), Austrian composer

== Y ==
- Yoni Bloch (born 1981), Israeli musician, songwriter, composer, rock singer, and hi-tech entrepreneur
- Yosef Leib Bloch (1860–1929), Lithuanian rabbi

== See also ==
- Block (surname)
