= Cornelia Pechmann =

American academic

Cornelia (Connie) Pechmann
- Occupations: Marketing researcher and academic
- Awards: Responsible Research in Marketing Award, American Marketing Association

Academic background
- Education: B.A., Psychology and Spanish, M.S., General Psychology; M.B.A., Marketing Management; Ph.D., Marketing Management
- Alma mater: Bucknell University; Vanderbilt University

Cornelia (Connie) Pechmann is an American academic and marketing research scholar. She is a professor of marketing at University of California, Irvine Paul Merage School of Business.

Pechmann has published numerous papers and articles regarding the effects of advertising, product labeling, social media, brand names and retail store locations on consumers. She is known for her research on studying adolescents' response to pro and anti-tobacco and drug advertising. Her recent work examines the use of social media for online self-help groups and she has worked on developing Tweet2Quit for smoking cessation.

Pechmann is the former editor-in-chief of Journal of Consumer Psychology.

== Education ==
Pechmann graduated in Psychology and Spanish from Bucknell University in 1981. She then studied at Vanderbilt University and in 1985, received her MS degree in General Psychology and MBA degree in Marketing Management. She completed her Ph.D. degree in Marketing Management from Vanderbilt University in 1988.

== Career ==
Pechmann taught briefly at California State University in Fullerton before joining The Paul Merage School of Business at University of California, Irvine as an assistant professor in 1988. She was promoted to associate professor in 1995 and became a professor of marketing in 2003.

Pechmann worked for several years for the White House Office of National Drug Control Policy and helped in overseeing the National Youth Anti-Drug Media Campaign.

== Research ==
Pechmann has conducted research on consumer behavior, the influence of social media and online communities, transformative consumer research, advertising strategy and regulation, deceptive advertising, micromarketing, and geographic information systems.

=== Tobacco-related advertising and adolescents’ response ===
Pechmann experimentally investigated the effects of antismoking advertisements on a non-smoker adolescent's perception of peers who smoke, and found that exposure to antismoking advertisements strengthened a non-smoker adolescent's belief that smokers irresponsibly damaged their health, and negatively affected the non-smoker's evaluation about a smoker's personal appeal. She studied the effects of exposure to smoking in movies and antismoking advertisements before movies, on youth. Pechmann found that the smoking scenes in movies increased the young viewer's intent to smoke, but the exposure of antismoking advertisements was observed to nullify the effect.

Pechmann applied protection motivation theory to study anti-smoking message theme effects on cognitions and intentions and identified the main message themes that increased adolescents' nonsmoking intentions. In her research regarding adolescents' response to antismoking advertising campaigns, Pechmann found that promotion (aspirational) focused youths responded best to promotion-focused positive messages while prevention (safety) focused youth responded best to prevention-focused negative messages.

=== Advertising strategy and regulation ===
Pechmann studied comparative advertising and investigated its influence on consumer's attention, memory and purchase intentions. Her study indicated that direct comparative claims led to an increase in purchase intention for low-share brands but had a contrary effect for established brands. She also found that the direct comparative advertisement strategy increased consumer's perception of an unfamiliar advertised brand through association and differentiation strategies; and that the direct comparative advertisement proved to be most effective when the featured attribute of the product was typical of the product category.

=== Consumer behavior research ===
Pechmann studied the influence of advertising on health related consumer behaviors and cognitions; and stressed the importance of tailoring the messages and executional styles for the specific target consumers and testing for both intended and unintended negative effects.

In her research regarding adolescent development from psychological and marketing perspectives, Pechmann found adolescents to be more impulsive and self-conscious than adults and thus were more vulnerable to harm. She stressed restricting the adolescents' exposure to advertisements of addictive or high-risk products.

=== Social media for online self-help groups ===
Pechmann researched the use of social media for online self-help groups and studied the activity of social network accounts on Twitter regarding quitting smoking. She worked on developing a Twitter-based intervention for smoking cessation, called Tweet2Quit. Pechmann's randomized controlled trial evaluation of Tweet2Quit indicated it to be engaging and a viable cessation treatment.

== Awards and honors ==
- 2004 - Exceptional Faculty Service Award, UCI Graduate School of Management
- 2005 - Best Paper Award for Paper Published in 2002, Journal of Consumer Research
- 2009 - Richard W. Pollay Prize for Intellectual Excellence in Research on Marketing in the Public Interest
- 2019 - UCI Academic Senate Special Award for Impact on Society
- 2020 - Inaugural Responsible Research in Marketing Award, American Marketing Association

== Selected articles ==
- Pechmann, Cornelia; Zhao, Guangzhi; Goldberg, Marvin E.; Reibling, Ellen Thomas (April 2003). "What to Convey in Antismoking Advertisements for Adolescents: The use of Protection Motivation Theory to Identify Effective Message Themes". Journal of Marketing. 67 (2): 1–18. doi:10.1509/jmkg.67.2.1.18607. S2CID 167652870.
- Pechmann, Cornelia; Stewart, David W. (1 March 1988). "Advertising Repetition: A Critical Review of Wearin and Wearout". Current Issues and Research in Advertising. 11 (1–2): 285–329. doi:10.1080/01633392.1988.10504936. S2CID 144961952.
- Pechmann, Cornelia; Shih, Chuan-Fong (July 1999). "Smoking Scenes in Movies and Antismoking Advertisements before Movies: Effects on Youth". Journal of Marketing. 63 (3): 1–13. doi:10.1177/002224299906300301. S2CID 191303158.
- Zhao, Guangzhi; Pechmann, Cornelia (November 2007). "The Impact of Regulatory Focus on Adolescents' Response to Antismoking Advertising Campaigns". Journal of Marketing Research. 44 (4): 671–687. doi:10.1509/jmkr.44.4.671. S2CID 167828343.
- Pechmann, Cornelia; Levine, Linda; Loughlin, Sandra; Leslie, Frances (September 2005). "Impulsive and Self-Conscious: Adolescents' Vulnerability to Advertising and Promotion". Journal of Public Policy & Marketing. 24 (2): 202–221. doi:10.1509/jppm.2005.24.2.202. S2CID 9950086.
