= Adam Block =

Adam Block is the name of:

- Adam Block (astrophotographer) (born 1973), American astronomer
- Adam Block (music critic) (1951–2008), American music critic
