= Profiat =

- Gender: Masculine

Origin
- Languages: Hebrew, Latin, or Provençal
- Region of origin: Provence and northern Spain

Profiat (Hebrew: פרופייט, Occitan: Prophègue or Profag, Latin: Profatius, French: Profait) was a name used by Jews in Provence and northern Spain. In modern times the name has been transcribed as Peripoth, Peripetus, Periphot, Prifoth, Prevot, Parfait, Pourpeth, Peripedes, and Prophiat. In combination with "En" (meaning "Senior") the name occurs as "Enprofiat" (אנפרופיית).

The form in Benjamin of Tudela's travels, and which Grätz explained as "from Perpignan," is a mistake for פרופייג. According to Buxtorf, Saenger, and Neubauer, "Profiat" is derived from the Latin "Profeta," and is a translation of the Hebrew "navi" (נביא), an epithet occasionally used in connection with learned rabbis. The word "navi," however, never occurs as a proper name in Hebrew documents, and the explanation is, therefore, doubtful.

Isaac Bloch and Heinrich Gross hold that the proper pronunciation of the name is "profet." The name is the same as Barfat, both originating in the Provençal "Perfetto."

== People with the given name Profiat ==
- Jacob ben Machir ibn Tibbon, also known as Prophatius
- Profiat Duran
