= Frank Block =

Frank Block may refer to:

- Frank Block (Australian politician) (1899–1971), Australian politician
- Frank Block (American politician), American politician in North Carolina
