= Anirban =

Anirban or Anirvan (Bengali: অনির্বাণ) is an Indian masculine given name. It is mostly used in the Bengali language. The meaning of the Sanskrit word anirvāṇa is "the fire that never stops" or "unextinguished". Notable people with this name include:

- Anirvan (1896–1978), Hindu scholar
- Anirban Bhattacharya, Bengali actor
- Anirban Chatterjee (born 1982), Indian cricketer
- Anirvan Ghosh, American neuroscientist
- Anirban Lahiri (born 1987), Indian golfer
- Anirban Mukhopadhyay, marketing scholar
- Anirban Kole
- Anirban Rana
