= Maud A. Merrill =

American psychologist (1888–1978)

Maud Amanda Merrill
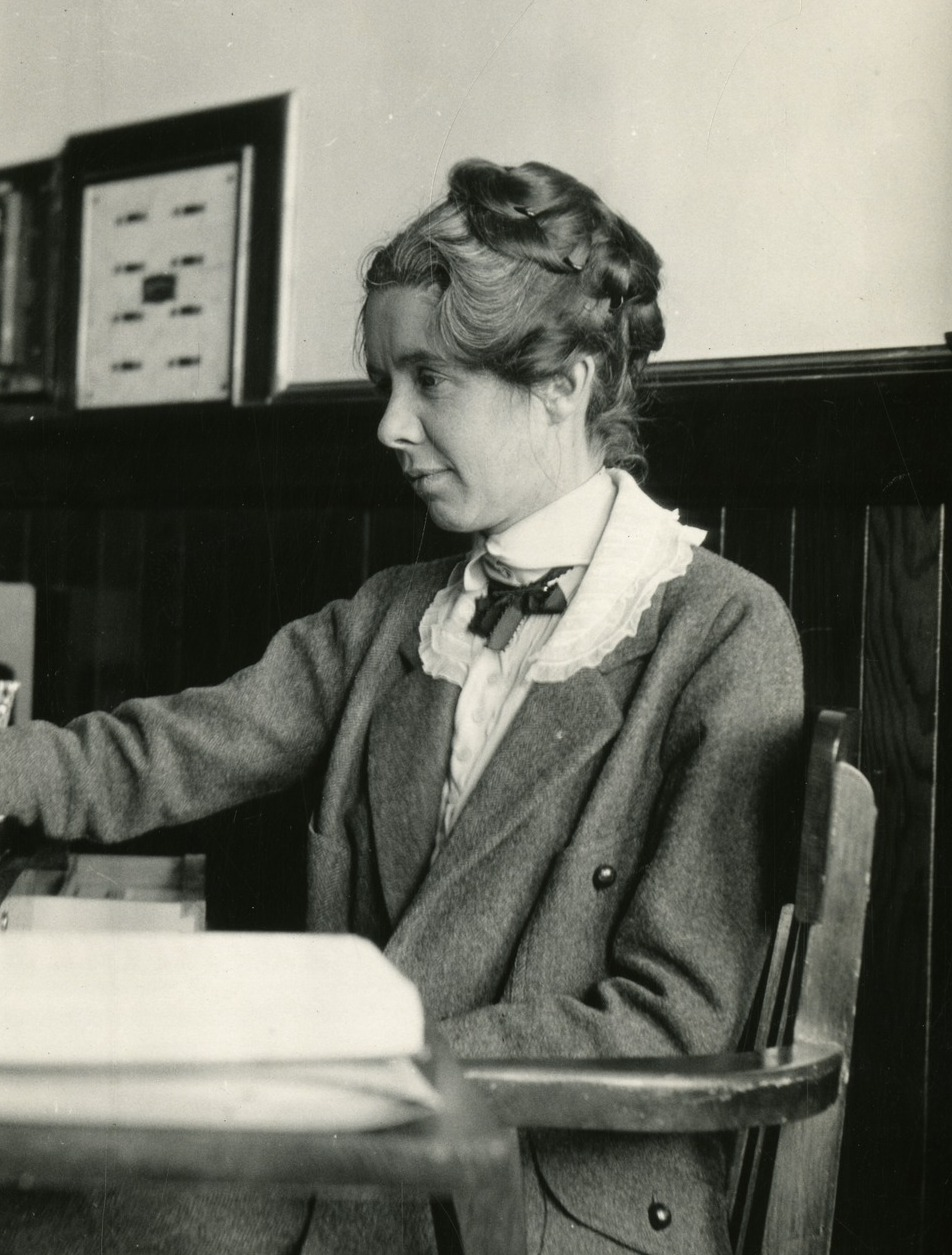
- Born: April 30, 1888; Owatonna, Minnesota
- Died: January 15, 1978 (aged 89); Stanford, California
- Known for: Revising the Stanford–Binet
- Spouse: William Francis James (m. 1933–1966) (his death)
- Scientific career
- Fields: Psychology
- Workplaces: Stanford University

Maud Amanda Merrill (April 30, 1888 – January 15, 1978) was an American psychologist. Both an alumna and faculty member of Stanford University, Merrill worked with Lewis Terman to develop the second and third editions of the Stanford–Binet Intelligence Scales.

== Early life ==
Merrill was born in 1888 in Owatonna, Minnesota. As a child, she lived at the Minnesota State Public School for Dependent and Neglected Children, an orphanage of which her father was the director. She earned a psychology degree from Oberlin College in 1911.

== Career ==
Employed by the Minnesota Bureau of Research, Merrill was a research assistant assigned to the Faribault Minnesota State Home for the Feeble Minded and she worked as an assistant to bureau head Fred Kuhlmann. After several years with the bureau, she decided to apply to the psychology program at Stanford University and pursue a Ph.D. Merrill wrote to Stanford to inquire about their graduate psychology program, but department head Frank Angell sent her an indifferent reply asking her why she could not attend a school closer to her.

Upon hearing about Angell's reply, Kuhlmann decided to intervene on Merrill's behalf. Kuhlmann wrote directly to educational psychology professor Lewis Terman, a well-known intelligence researcher with whom Merrill hoped to work. Merrill worked with Terman as she earned a master's degree in education and wrote her Master's thesis, "The Relation of the 'three Rs' in the case of retarded children" in 1920. Terman later took over as head of the psychology department in 1922, and Merrill earned a Ph.D. in psychology from Stanford in 1923. After earning this degree, Dr. Merrill took on the responsibility of training both graduate and undergraduate students within the Psychology department.

In the early 1920's, Merrill also worked as a consultant for the juvenile courts in San Jose, California and established a small psychological clinic for children. That work introduced her to Judge William Francis James, who she grew fond of and married in 1933. After her marriage, she was occasionally referred to as Merrill-James (or Merrill James), but continued to use the name Merrill in her publications. The clinic provided an opportunity for her graduate students to gain experience working with disturbed or delinquent children.

Merrill became a faculty member at Stanford, where she continued to work with Terman. The pair collaborated on Genetic Studies of Genius, a longitudinal study of highly intelligent people. Terman and Merrill published a second edition of his Stanford-Binet Intelligence Scales (1931). Though she retired in 1954 and Terman died in 1956, Merrill released a third edition of the scales in 1960. Merrill was a mentor to budding developmental psychologist Jeanne Block, who became known for her studies of twin and non-twin siblings.

The work for the juvenile courts also inspired her 1947 book, Problems of Child Delinquency. That book explored the environments and temperaments of delinquent children. In a review of the book, Ohio State University professor Walter Reckless said that her work "gives ample reason to reconsider the factor of the broken-home family, which many sociologists have discounted in recent years, as well as the IQ level in determining delinquency..."

== Death ==
Merrill died at her home in 1978. She lived on the Stanford University campus for nearly 60 years as a graduate student, faculty member and retiree. She was predeceased by her husband in 1966.
