= NGC 3614 =

Spiral galaxy in the constellation Ursa Major

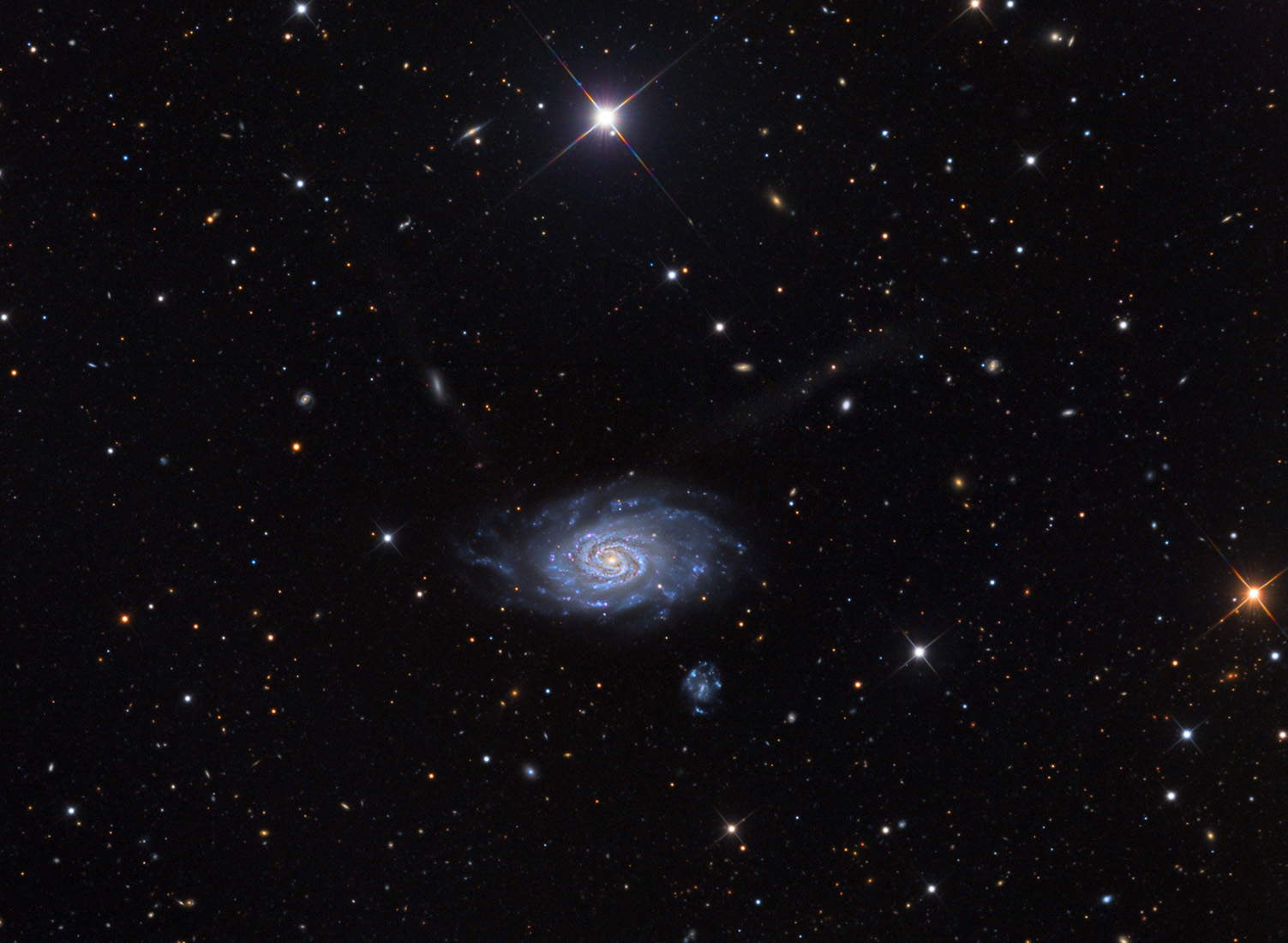
- NGC 3614 by the 32-inch Schulman Telescope at Mount Lemmon Observatory

Observation data (J2000 epoch)
- Constellation: Ursa Major
- Right ascension: 11^{h} 18^{m} 21.3533^{s}
- Declination: 45° 44′ 53.737″
- Redshift: 0.007769 ± 0.000005
- Heliocentric radial velocity: 2,329 ± 1 km/s
- Distance: 120 ± 32 Mly (36.9 ± 9.8 Mpc)
- Apparent magnitude (V): 11.6

Characteristics
- Type: SAB(r)c
- Apparent size (V): 4.6′ × 2.6′

Other designations
- UGC 6318, CGCG 242-019, MCG +08-21-015, PGC 34561

NGC 3614 is an intermediate spiral galaxy located in the constellation Ursa Major. It is located at a distance of about 120 million light years from Earth, which, given its apparent dimensions, means that NGC 3614 is about 150,000 light years across. It was discovered by William Herschel on February 5, 1788.

== Characteristics ==
NGC 3614 is an intermediate spiral galaxy with a small bright nucleus and traces of a faint bar. However, there is no bar detected in the infrared images obtained by the Spitzer Space Telescope, with the galaxy's morphological type being characterised as SA(r)bc by the ARRAKIS study. The galaxy features a narrow inner ring measuring 0.47 by 0.24 arcminutes. From the inner ring emerge two main, knotty and filamentary arms that start branching after three quarters of a revolution creating a multiple spiral arm pattern. Many HII regions and star forming knots are visible in the arms. The star formation rate of the galaxy is estimated to be 0.3 M_{☉} per year. The galactic disk extends 5′.4 in its major east–west axis and 3′ along its minor north–south axis.

Adam Block discovered the galaxy has two stellar streams. The brighter stellar stream begins at the northern part of the galactic disk and extends 4′.6 at a position angle of 314° with respect to the nucleus of NGC 3614 (in the direction of galaxy 2MASSX J11180157+4547453). The stream is uniform in its brightness and devoid of any discernable structure. The second stream appears to be associated with galaxy SDSS J111838+454721.7. The total length of this stream is approximately 3′.8 at a position angle of 40°. The galaxy could be the progenitor of the stream and both the trailing and leading tidal tails are visible.

== Nearby galaxies ==
NGC 3614 seems to form a pair with NGC 3614A, which lies at distance of 2.6 arcminutes, which appears diffuse and patchy, however it is a background galaxy. NGC 3614 forms a group with NGC 3583 and NGC 3595.

== Gallery ==
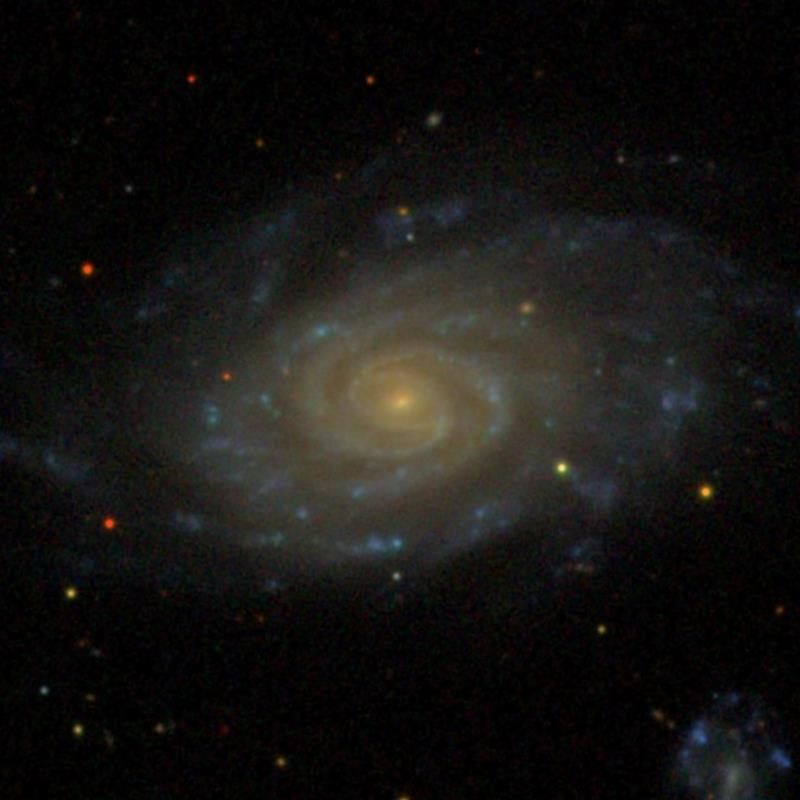
NGC 3614 by the Sloan Digital Sky Survey
