= NGC 3583 =

Galaxy in the constellation Ursa Major

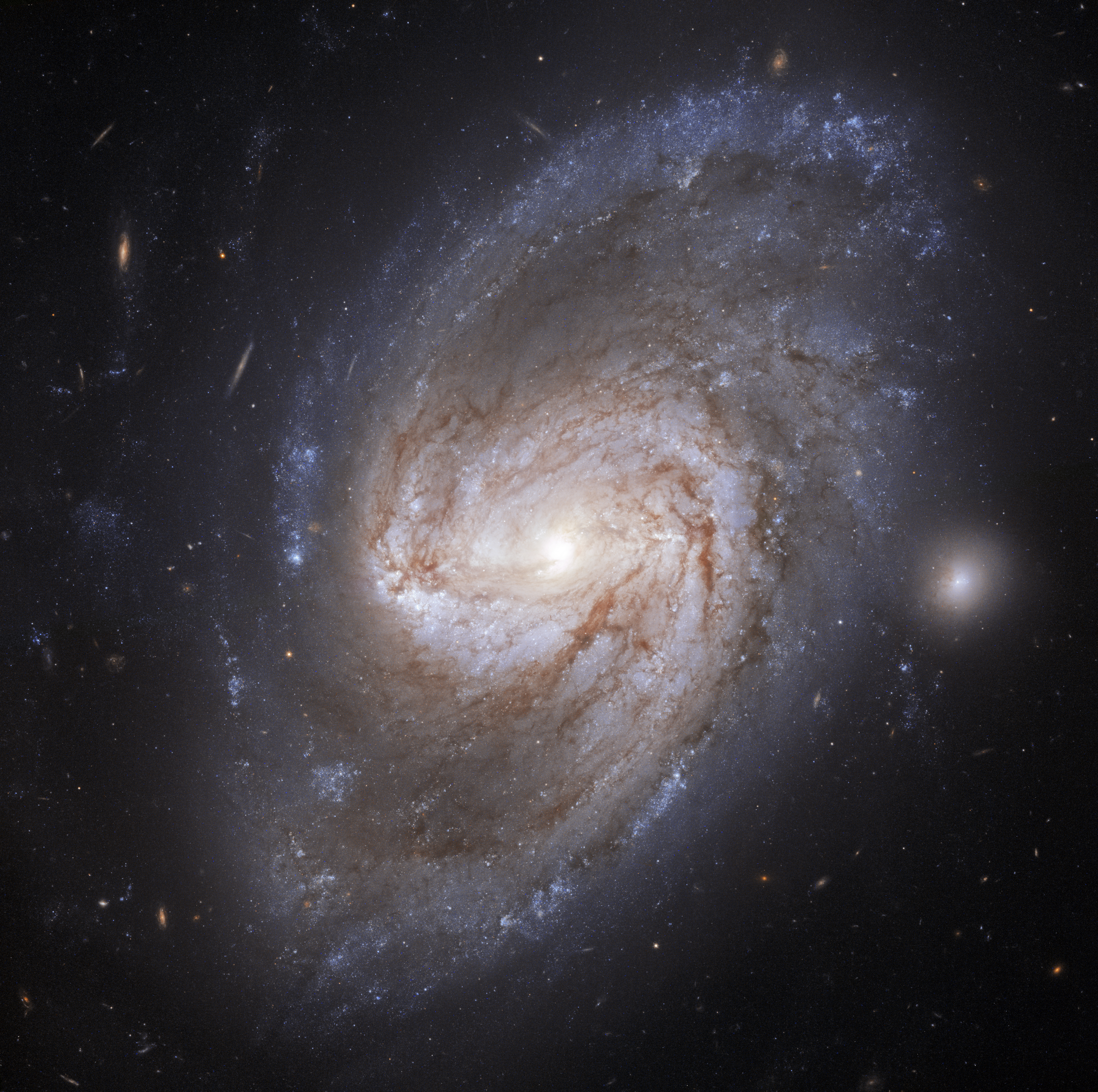
- NGC 3583 imaged by the Hubble Space Telescope

Observation data (J2000 epoch)
- Constellation: Ursa Major
- Right ascension: 11^{h} 14^{m} 10.9^{s}
- Declination: 48° 19′ 07″
- Redshift: 0.007022 ± 0.000010
- Heliocentric radial velocity: 2,105 ± 3 km/s
- Distance: 90.5 ± 10.2 Mly (27.7 ± 3.1 Mpc)
- Apparent magnitude (V): 11.2

Characteristics
- Type: SB(s)b
- Apparent size (V): 3.04′ × 1.16′

Other designations
- UGC 6263, MCG +08-21-008, PGC 34232, 5C 02.203

NGC 3583 is a barred spiral galaxy located in the constellation Ursa Major. It is located at a distance of circa 90 million light years from Earth, which, given its apparent dimensions, means that NGC 3583 is about 85,000 light years across. It was discovered by William Herschel on February 5, 1788.

== Characteristics ==
NGC 3585 has a bright nucleus and an elliptical bulge. It has a prominent bar which is about 30 arcseconds long. The spiral arms start approximately at the radius of the end of the bar. One arm emanates from northwest edge of the bulge. At its start is quite diffuse but after passing near the bar becomes better defined. After reaching the southeast part of the galaxy it starts to fade. The other arm emanates from the southeast end of the bar. It appears to branch after passing from the other side of the bar, with the two branches running parallelly.

The galaxy has many HII regions. The star formation rate in the galaxy based on the infrared luminosity is 9.8 M_{☉} per year.

== Supernovae ==
Two supernovae have been observed in NGC 3583:

- SN 1975P (type unknown, mag. 15) was discovered by Charles Kowal on 1 December 1975.
- ASASSN-15so (Type Ia, mag. 15.1) was discovered by ASAS-SN on 8 November 2015, about 10 days before maximum light.

== Nearby galaxies ==
NGC 3583 is the foremost galaxy in the NGC 3583 galaxy group. Also member of the group is the galaxy NGC 3595, while a bit farther away lies NGC 3614 and its group. NGC 3583 forms a pair with a small elliptical galaxy, which lies 0.9 arcminutes from NGC 3583. Barred spiral galaxy NGC 3577 lies at a projected distance of 5 arcminutes.

== See also ==
- List of NGC objects (3001–4000)
