= John Block =

John Block may refer to:

- John Block (South African politician) (born 1968), South African politician
- John Nicolaas Block (1929–1994), Dutch aviation pioneer
- John Rusling Block (born 1935), United States Secretary of Agriculture
- John Block (basketball), (born 1944), American basketball player
- John Block (filmmaker) (born 1951), American filmmaker
- Jack Block (1924–2010), American psychology professor
- John Block (New Mexico politician), American politician
