= Heinz P. Bloch =

American mechanical engineer (1933–2022)

Heinz P. Bloch (December 26, 1933 – August 20, 2022) was an American mechanical engineer with specialization in failure avoidance, machinery maintenance cost reduction and machinery reliability improvement. As of 2020 he has authored over 760 technical papers and conference publications and has written 24 books (48 Editions---some translated into Russian, Spanish, Hebrew, and Portuguese) on practical machinery management and oil mist lubrication. He holds seven U.S. patents relating to high speed machinery.

== Education ==
Bloch graduated from the New Jersey Institute of Technology (NJIT) with B.S.M.E. (1962) and M.S.M.E. degrees (1964, cum laude). He is an ASME Fellow, and retains life-time registration with the association as a Professional Engineer in New Jersey.

== Career ==
After an initial high-speed machine design career with Johnson & Johnson and later switching to Exxon Research & Engineering, he retired as the U.S. Regional Machinery Engineer from Exxon Chemicals. He continued involvement as a reliability expert and teacher since becoming the editor/originator of Hydrocarbon Processing magazine's monthly "HP in Reliability" column. In early 2019, he was recognized in the inaugural group of 10 distinguished alumni of "NCE 100," NJIT/Newark College of Engineering's Hall of Fame. The "NCE 100" distinction is bestowed upon honorees who have made tangible contributions to human welfare through major achievements in science, technology, engineering, literary works, public service, or business.

Bloch died of complications of cancer on August 20, 2022, at the age of 88.

== Books ==
- Introduction to Machinery Reliability Assessment (with F.K.Geitner), Gulf Publishing Company, 2nd Ed., 1994
- Improving Machinery Reliability Gulf Publishing Company, 1st Ed. 1982, 2nd Ed. 1990, 3rd Ed. 1997
- Machinery Failure Analysis and Troubleshooting (with F.K. Geitner), Elsevier Publishing Company, 4th Ed., 2012
- A Practical Guide to Compressor Technology, John Wiley Publishing Company, 2nd Ed., 2006
- Guia Practica Para la Tecnologia de los Compresores, McGraw-Hill Publishing Co., 1998
- A Practical Guide to Steam Turbine Technology (with Dr. M. Singh), 2nd Ed., McGraw-Hill, 2009
- Guia Practica Para la Tecnologia de las Turbinas de Vapor, McGraw-Hill Publishing Co., 1998
- Oil Mist Lubrication: Practical Applications, (with Dr. A. Shamim), Fairmont Publishing, 1998
- Process Plant Machinery (with C. Soares), Elsevier Publishing Company, 2nd Ed., 1998
- Practical Lubrication for Industrial Facilities (with Kenneth Bannister), 3rd Ed., Fairmont Press, 2016.
- Pump User's Handbook: Life Extension (with A.R. Budris), 4th Ed., Fairmont Press (also Marcel Dekker), 2013
- Maximizing Machinery Uptime - (with F.K. Geitner) Gulf Publishing Company, 2006
- Reciprocating Compressor Operation and Maintenance, (with J. Hoefner) Gulf Publishing Company, 2001
- Turboexpander Technology and Applications, (with C. Soares) Butterworth-Heinemann, 1996
- Machinery Component Maintenance and Repair (with F.K. Geitner), 4th Ed., Elsevier Publishing Company, 2019
- Major Process Equipment Maintenance and Repair, (with F.K. Geitner), 2nd Ed., Gulf Publishing Company, 1997
- Pump Wisdom: Problem Solving for Operators and Specialists, John Wiley & Sons, Hoboken, NJ, 2011; 2nd Ed. with Robert X. Perez, 2022
- Compressors: How to Achieve High Reliability and Availability, (with F.K. Geitner), McGraw-Hill, New York, NY, 2012
- Compressores: Um Guia Pratico para a Confiabilidade e a Disponibilidade, (Portuguese Translation, Bookman Editora Ltda, Porto Allegre, 2014)
- "Analise e Solucao de Falhas em Sistemas Mechanicos;" (Portuguese Translation, Elsevier Editora Ltda, Rio de Janeiro, Brasil, 2015)
- "Petrochemical Machinery Insights;" Elsevier Publishing/Butterworth-Heinemann, Oxford, UK and Cambridge, MA, 2017
- "Optimized Equipment Lubrication, Oil Mist Technology and Storage Preservation," (with F. Geitner & D. Ehlert), soft cover, 1st Ed., Reliabilityweb, Ft. Myers, FL, 2020
- "Fluid Machinery: Life Extension for Pumps, Gas Compressors and Turbines," De Gruyter, Berlin, Germany, 2020
- "Compressor Technology Advances," (with Hurlel G. Elliott), De Gruyter, Berlin, Germany, 2021
- "Optimized Equipment Lubrication: Conventional Lube, Oil Mist Lubrication and Full Standby Protection," (revised, substantially expanded hard cover Edition) De Gruyter, Berlin, Germany, 2021
