= Lauren Block =

American marketing academic

Lauren Goldberg Block is an American marketing academic.

Block earned a bachelor's degree from University at Albany, SUNY in 1984, followed by a Master's in Business Administration from Emory University in 1988, and subsequently completed doctoral studies at Columbia University in 1993. She is the Lippert Professor of Marketing at Baruch College's Zicklin School of Business. In 2020, Block was appointed the chief editor of the Journal of Consumer Psychology, succeeding Anirban Mukhopadhyay in the role.
