= Stuart Block =

English cricketer (born 1979)

Personal information
- Born: 6 January 1979 (age 47); Hereford, England
- Source: Cricinfo, 10 April 2017

Stuart Block (born 6 January 1979) is an English cricketer. He played six first-class matches for Cambridge University Cricket Club between 2000 and 2001. In April 2001, he carried his bat in a match against Kent County Cricket Club.

== See also ==
- List of Cambridge University Cricket Club players
