= Oil mist lubrication =

Oil mist lubrication is a method of lubricating machinery and equipment that involves delivering a fine mist or aerosol of oil particles into the lubrication points where friction and wear occur. Oils are applied to rolling element (antifriction) bearings as an oil mist. Neither oil rings nor constant level lubricators are used in pumps and drivers connected to plant-wide oil mist systems. Oil mist is an atomized amount of oil carried or suspended in a volume of pressurized dry air. The oil mist, actually a ratio of one volume of oil suspended or carried in 200,000 volumes of clean, dry air, moves in a piping system (header). The point of origin is usually a mixing valve (the oil mist generator), connected to this header. Branch lines often feed oil mist to hundreds of rolling elements in the many pumps and drivers connected to a plant-wide system.

At standstill, or while on standby, pump and driver bearings are preserved by the surrounding oil mist, which exists in the bearing housing space at a pressure just barely higher than ambient. These pump and driver bearings are lubricated from the time when atomized oil globules join (or wet out) to become larger oil droplets. This joining-into-large-droplets starts whenever the equipment shafts rotate, which is when small globules come into contact with each other and start coating the bearing elements.

As of April 2019, over 160,000 process centrifugal pumps are operating with oil mist as the sole bearing lubricant. The estimated number of electric motors on pure oil mist exceeds 50,000; several of these at a Texas Gulf Coast petrochemical facility have been in flawless service since 1978. Oil mist technology is mature and has been in highly successful plant-wide use since the early 1960s.

There are also plant-wide oil distribution systems whereby liquid oil (not an oil/air mixture) is pressurized and injected, through spray nozzles, into the pump bearings. These oil spray systems are not to be confused with the more economical oil mist systems. However, both oil mist and oil spray applications can take credit for lower frictional losses and both should be taken into account while performing cost justification analyses. These analyses are highlighted in Bloch/Geitner/Ehlert "Optimized Equipment Lubrication, Oil Mist Technology, and Storage Preservation," (late 2019), Reliabilityweb Publishing, Ft. Myers, Florida.
