= Jacob Block =

Dutch Golden Age painter

Jacob Roger Block, or Jacob Reyersz. Block (1580–1646) was a Dutch Golden Age painter from Gouda.

He went to Italy when he was very young, and applied himself particularly to the study of architecture and perspective. He made designs of the fine remains of antiquity in the environs of Rome, and, on his return to Holland, painted some pictures composed from those subjects, which were highly esteemed. Houbraken wrote that Peter Paul Rubens, in a journey he made through Holland, visited this artist (in 1627), and on seeing his works, pronounced him the ablest painter of his country in the subjects he represented. He served king Sigismund III Vasa at his court, where he received high praise. The ensuing jealousy made him decide to return to his native land, where he learned mathematics from an officer named Percival. In 1639, 1642, and 1643 he is registered as a landmeter, or mapmaker in Gouda.

He also excelled in military architecture, and was taken into the service of the Archduke Leopold Wilhelm of Austria, whom he accompanied in some of his military campaigns. He was killed by a fall from his horse near Winoxbergen in Flanders in 1646.
