= Melvin Block =

American lawyer

Melvin Block (1928–June 10, 1985) was an American plaintiffs' trial lawyer from New York City.

== Biography ==
Block graduated from Brooklyn Law School in 1950. In his 35-year legal career, he wrote a number of books on litigation, including The Art of Summation (on closing argument) and Medical Malpractice (on medical malpractice litigation). In 1966, President Lyndon B. Johnson appointed him to the Advisory Committee on Products Liability. Block served as president of the New York State Trial Lawyers Association from 1972 to 1973.

Block died of a heart attack on June 10, 1985, at his home in Massapequa Park, Long Island, at age 57. He was survived by his wife Adele and their two sons, Michael, of Massapequa Park, and Daniel, of Farmingdale, Long Island.

Block was a member of the Inner Circle of Advocates.
