= Anna Katharina Block =

German artist (1642–1719)

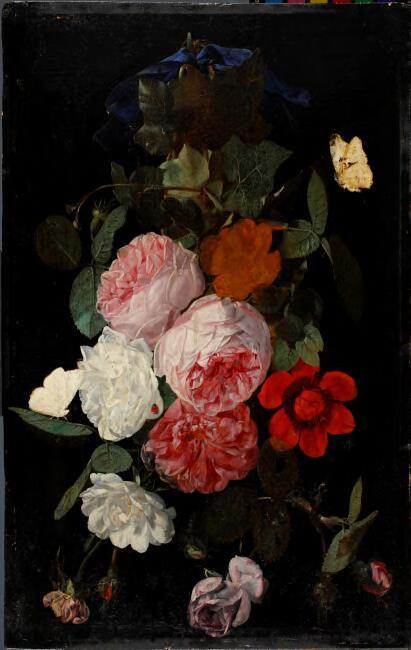
Flowers, circa 1660-1718

Anna Katharina Block (1642–1719) was a German Baroque flower painter.

== Biography ==
She was born Anna Katharina Fischer in Nuremberg. According to Houbraken she was the daughter of the flower painter Johann Thomas Fischer who taught her to paint. She was good at painting flowers in water colors and in oils, and taught the Duchess Anna Maria of Mecklenburg-Schwerin, the wife of the Duke August von Sachsen, and their daughters in Halle, Saxony-Anhalt in the 1660s. She married the painter Benjamin Block in 1664 and was still alive when Joachim von Sandrart was writing his Teutsche Academie, which is where Houbraken took his data from. She died in Regensburg in 1719.
