= Rudolph Edgar Block =

Jewish American journalist, columnist, and author

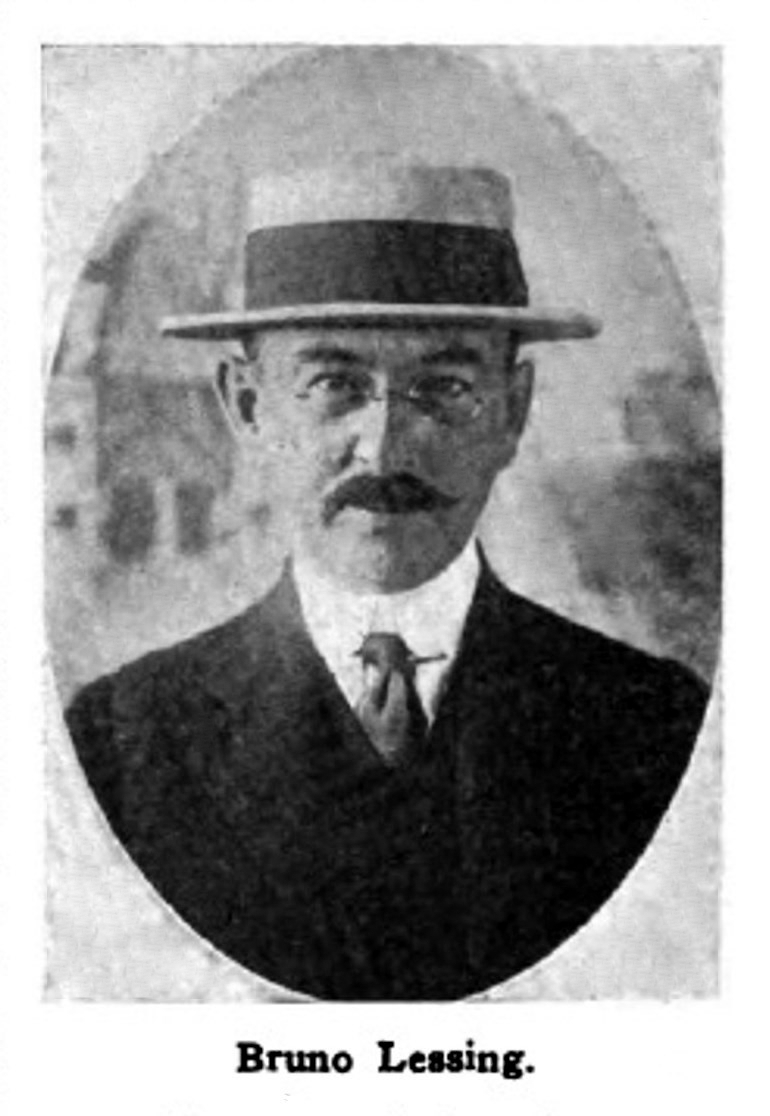
- Born: December 6, 1870; New York City
- Died: April 29, 1940 (aged 69); Tucson, Arizona
- Occupations: journalist, columnist, author
- Spouse: Eleanor Block
- Children: Rudolph, Albert

Rudolph Edgar Block (December 6, 1870 – April 29, 1940) was a Jewish American journalist, columnist, and author. Much of his writing was done under the pen name of Bruno Lessing.

== Biography ==
Rudolph Block began his career as a journalist in 1888. He worked first as a news reporter on The New York Sun and later joined The New York World. In 1896 he became the editor of the comic supplements to the Hearst newspapers, a position he held for the next 28 years. During his tenure he supplied text for The Yellow Kid and helped to create such popular series as Happy Hooligan and The Katzenjammer Kids. As "Bruno Lessing" his short stories chronicled life in the Jewish ghetto of New York City. Between 1905 and 1909, many of these tales were published by Cosmopolitan, which at that time was a literary magazine. During the years 1915 – 1916 he also wrote a number of screenplays depicting the Jewish American experience.

Ambrose Bierce, another frequent contributor to Cosmopolitan, mentioned Block in his satirical work The Devil's Dictionary, recounting the author's alleged encounter with a prominent critic. A short poem by Bierce, titled "Rudolph Block", had no apparent connection to the man himself.

An avid traveler, Block wrote about his experiences in the daily newspaper column "Vagabondia", which was published from 1928 through 1939. Along the way he amassed a collection of 1,400 walking sticks, although he himself walked unaided. After his death, the collection of canes, each made from a unique type of wood, was donated to Yale University.

== Selected works ==
- 1903 Children of Men
- 1909 Jake or Sam
- 1914 With the Best Intention
