= Herman S. Bloch =

American chemist and inventor

Herman Samuel Bloch (June 15, 1912 – June 16, 1990) was an American chemist and an inventor. Bloch invented the catalytic converter, a device that removes pollutants from automobile exhaust fumes. Bloch held more than 270 patents. He was the deputy director of research of the aerospace company AlliedSignal Inc, and chairman of the Cook County Housing Authority. He received the Chemical Pioneer Award in 1989 from the American Institute of Chemists. He received the Ernest J. Houdry Award in Applied Catalysis, the E. V. Murphree Award in Industrial and Engineering Chemistry in 1974, and the Richard J. Kokes Memorial Award and Lectureship from Johns Hopkins University in 1971. Bloch was elected to the National Academy of Sciences in 1975.

== Career ==
Bloch was born in Chicago, Illinois. His parents were Ukrainian-Jewish immigrants Aaron and Esther Bloch. He received his B.A. and Ph.D. in organic chemistry in 1936 from the University of Chicago.
