= David Block =

British Army officer

- Born: David Arthur Kennedy William Block; 13 June 1908
- Died: 2001 (aged 92−93)
- Military career
- Allegiance: United Kingdom
- Branch: British Army
- Service years: 1928–1961
- Rank: Brigadier
- Unit: Royal Artillery
- Commands: Ayrshire Yeomanry; 2nd Regiment, Royal Horse Artillery
- Conflicts: Second World War
- Awards: Commander of the Order of the British Empire; Distinguished Service Order; Military Cross

Brigadier David Arthur Kennedy William Block CBE DSO MC (13 June 1908 – 2001) was a British Army officer who, during the Second World War, won a Military Cross when commanding "C" Battery of the Ayrshire Yeomanry in North Africa and the DSO in Italy the following year. He was later appointed ADC to the Queen.

== Early life ==
Block was born at Cothall in Aberdeenshire and was the twin brother of Major-General Adam Block. He was educated at Blundell's School in Tiverton and at the Royal Military Academy at Woolwich before being commissioned into the Royal Artillery in 1928. In 1931, Block joined the 2nd Regiment, Royal Horse Artillery, and went with them to Cairo as adjutant. He was an instructor at RMA Woolwich in 1936 until the outbreak of war.

== World War II ==
On the outbreak of war Block was posted to the 12th Light Anti-Aircraft Regiment, TA, in West Lothian, again as adjutant. His obituary records his wartime services in North Africa and Italy:

“In April 1943, the Axis forces were slowly being squeezed into a pocket around Tunis. On 9 April, the 26th Armoured Brigade received orders to drive a gap through the high ridges flanking the Fondouk Pass. Standing in their way, guarding the entrance, was the Djebel Rhorab, a rocky outcrop held by German infantry in strength. The armour's advance was blocked by mines and anti-tank guns at the western end of the pass and the task of pushing the enemy off the Rhorab was given to the 1st Guards Brigade. Block, then a major, was the battery commander chosen to accompany a battalion of the Welsh Guards in the attack. The Welsh Guards assaulted the Rhorab under covering fire from the Yeomanry guns. Shells landed only a few yards ahead of the advancing Welshmen, but so well were the Germans dug in that it took four attempts before the position was captured. For his superb fire control and courage during the bitter fighting, Block was awarded a MC.

Block attended Staff College in 1942 and, later that year, was appointed GS02 to the 6th Armoured Division at Troon and then in North Africa. In January 1943, he moved from Divisional HQ to take command of "C" Battery of the Ayrshire Yeomanry at Bou Arada, south-west of Tunis. In March, when the rest of his regiment was out of the line, the Germans mounted a strong attack, over-running the infantry positions and advancing to within 600 yards of the battery position. Block responded with deadly accurate shooting and the onslaught was beaten off with heavy enemy casualties. He was Mentioned in Despatches.

In April, following the action in which Block won his MC, the Ayrshire Yeomanry lost two CO's within a few days. Block took over and in May led his regiment in the final battle for Tunis. Block embarked for Naples with his regiment and their 25-pounder field guns in February 1944. It was the Ayrshire Yeomanry's first experience of mountains and mule tracks. In April, the 1st Guards Brigade took over the Cassino sector with the Yeomanry in support. Much of the town was a chaotic maze of rubble, ruins and craters. Strong points, like the jail and the cemetery crypt outside the town, were turned into battalion HQs with the Yeomanry manning observation posts and providing the wireless operators. The German 1st Parachute Division was aggressive and its snipers and machineguns were all too efficient. In some areas the houses that they occupied were within 50 yards of British positions. Block devised a highly effective system of shooting that caused great destruction to these targets, and when some German tanks crept into the town, he borrowed an American 8 in howitzer and scored several direct hits. On Hitler's birthday, the German part of the town was bedecked with swastikas. The gunners tried to shoot these down but with only partial success. Life in Cassino started after dark. The route to the crypt HQ was within range of the German guns and had to be negotiated ventre a terre, in total silence. Porters delivered supplies under a nightly smokescreen. The German soldiers formed up for PT drill outside the Hotel des Roses, but the Yeomanry soon put a stop to that. On one occasion, returning from a late visit to a battalion HQ, Block and a small party became lost in no-man's land. The terrain was covered by German machineguns on fixed lines and was devoid of a single feature that could help them regain their bearings. Suddenly, in an uncanny stillness, a nightingale sang. "I know where we are," exclaimed Block, "we must be in Berkeley Square!"

After Cassino, the Ayrshire Yeomanry fought a mobile battle northwards up the spine of Italy to the Gothic Line. It was a slogging match with the German rearguards who could choose their ground for battle. In May, the advance of the 1st Guards Brigade was halted by the enemy dug in on Monte Piccolo, a bleak and stony hill south of Arce. The Guards attacked, supported by the Yeomanry gunners, and captured the feature. The German paratroopers counter-attacked four times. Each assault was broken up by brilliant shooting directed by Block, who was wounded in the action. For his skill and gallantry in leading his regiment through its many battles, Block was awarded the DSO. In the autumn of 1944, he was posted to 8th Army HQ as GSO1 RA before moving to Allied HQ in Vienna the following year. He returned to England in 1947 on his appointment as College Commander of RMA Sandhurst.

== Post war ==
In 1949, Block assumed command of the 2nd Regiment, Royal Horse Artillery and was stationed at Retford and Hildesheim, before being posted to SHAPE at Versailles as GSO1 in 1951. In 1953, he was appointed Commander, Royal Artillery, 7th Armoured Division at Verden. He commanded the 18th Training Brigade RA at Oswestry in 1958, was appointed ADC to the Queen in 1959, retiring in 1961 as a brigadier.

Following his retirement Block became involved in his local community, being a churchwarden at West Chelborough in Dorset and chairman of the Cattistock Hunt.

== Sources ==
- Obituary of Brigadier David Block, The Daily Telegraph, 14 July, 2001
