= Elisa Bloch =

French sculptor

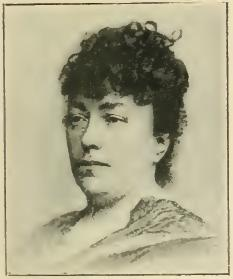
Elisa Bloch

Elisa Bloch (c. 1848, Breslau, Silesia - 1904 or 1905) was a Silesian-French sculptor. She was an officer of public instruction, Commander of the Order of the Liberator, and Chevalier of the Order of the Dragon of Annam. She was a pupil of Henri Chapu. Her first exhibition was at the Salon of 1878, a medallion portrait of M. Bloch; this was followed by "Hope," the "Golden Age," "Virginius Sacrificing his Daughter," "Moses Receiving the Tables of the Law," and others. Bloch made numerous portrait busts, among them being the kings of Spain and Portugal, Buffalo Bill, C. Flammarion, and others. She received honorable mention at an 1894 showing. At the Salon of the Artistes Francais, 1903, Bloch exhibited a "Portrait of M. Frederic Passy, Member of the Institute".
