= Anirban Mukhopadhyay =

Marketing scholar

Anirban Mukhopadhyay is a consumer psychologist and marketing scholar associated with the Bayes Business School and formerly the Hong Kong University of Science and Technology. In September 2026, he was elected President of the Policy Board of the Journal of Consumer Research. He was Editor-in-Chief of the Journal of Consumer Psychology from 2018 to 2020 and Co-Editor in 2016 and 2017. At HKUST, he served as Associate Provost (Teaching & Learning) from 2020 to 2022 and Associate Dean of the School of Business and Management from 2015 to 2020.
