= Spencer Block =

English cricketer

Spencer Allen Block (15 July 1908 – 7 October 1979) was an English first-class cricketer active 1928–48 who played for Surrey. Played rugby for the Harlequins and trialed for England. Represented and captained England at hockey. He was born in Esher; died in Meadle.
