= Adam Block (astrophotographer) =

American astronomer

Adam David Block
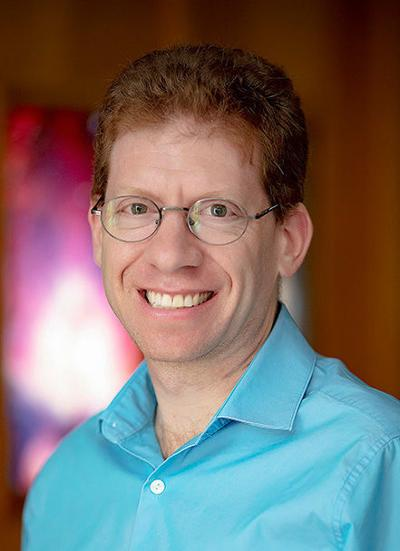
- Born: 1973 (age 52–53); Warwick, Rhode Island
- Known for: Astrophotography

Adam David Block (born 1973) is an American astrophotographer, astronomy researcher, writer and instructor.

== Biography ==
Block grew up in Rhode Island and Georgia, moving west in 1991 to attend the University of Arizona. In 1996, he earned his B.S. degree in Astronomy and Physics. After graduation, he was employed by the National Optical Astronomy Observatory for its public outreach program on Kitt Peak, which he did for nine years. In 2007 he founded the Mount Lemmon SkyCenter for the University of Arizona, which offers public stargazing programs as well as specialized programs in astrophotography. From 2016 on, he has continued work at Steward Observatory, the research arm of the Department of Astronomy at the University of Arizona. Much of his current work concerns characterizing the night sky and space domain awareness.

== Astrophotographer ==
From the age of 13, Block has been an avid astrophotographer. His images and techniques have been featured in Astronomy Magazine, Sky & Telescope, National Geographic, Scientific American and L'Astronomie. Many have been used by space-based observatories as references for ground-based broadband images of objects. NASA has used Block's images over 100 times as Astronomy Picture of the Day.

Block describes himself as a popularizer of astronomy through public outreach, but that "... astrophotography has much greater reach since the images I create can be seen by people around the world.” At the 2012 Advanced Imaging Conference, he received the annual Hubble Award for special contributions to the field of astroimaging.

The Minor Planet Center credits Block with the discovery of asteroid 45298 Williamon, made on January 5, 2000. He also has an asteroid named for him, 172525 Adamblock.

Block reported the discovery of stellar tidal streams associated with NGC 3614, initially identified in February 2015.

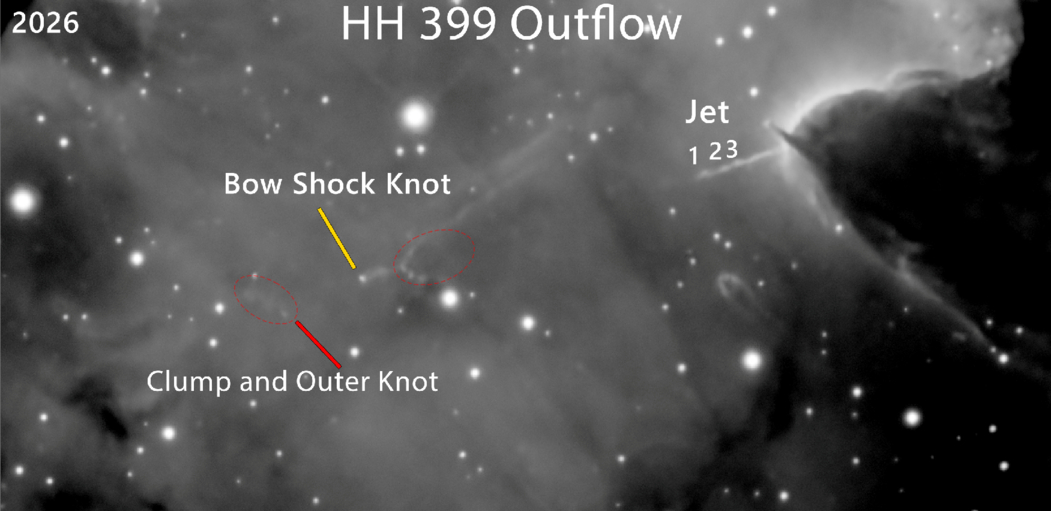
Comparison of ground-based observations of the HH 399 outflow obtained in 2026.

In 2026, Block reported a ground-based detection of proper motion throughout the HH 399 outflow in the Trifid Nebula, using observations obtained 17 years apart.

Block offers instruction in astrophotography and techniques of image processing, both through magazine articles and personally through his online studios.

== Gallery ==
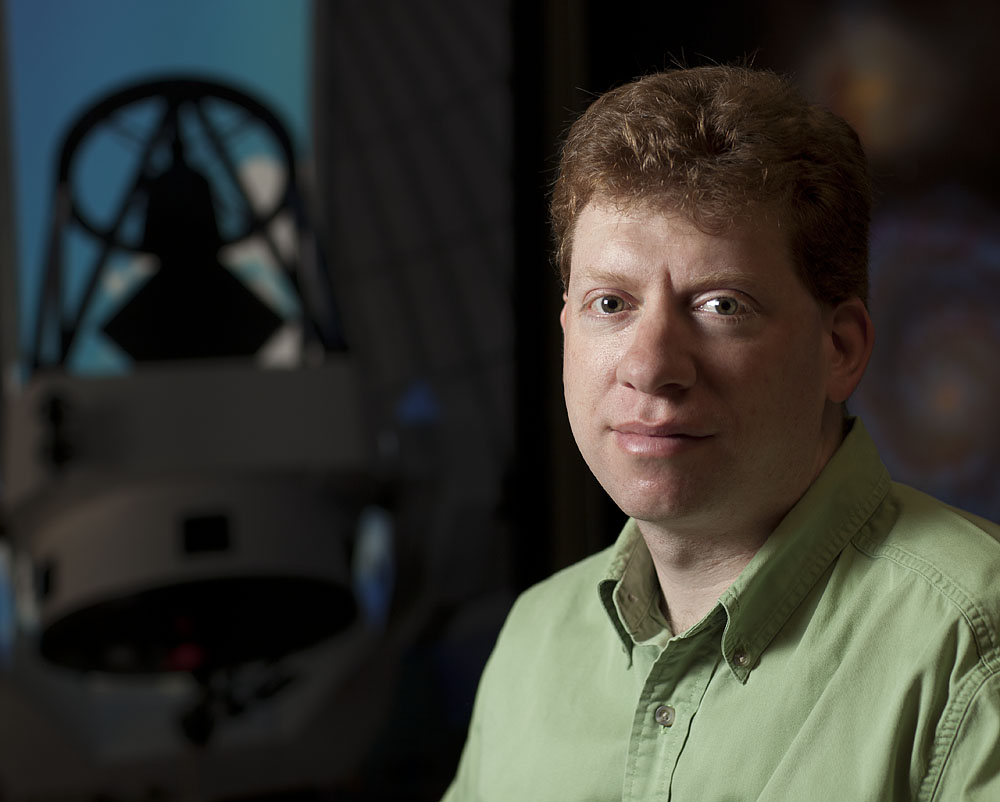
Adam Block as of 2011

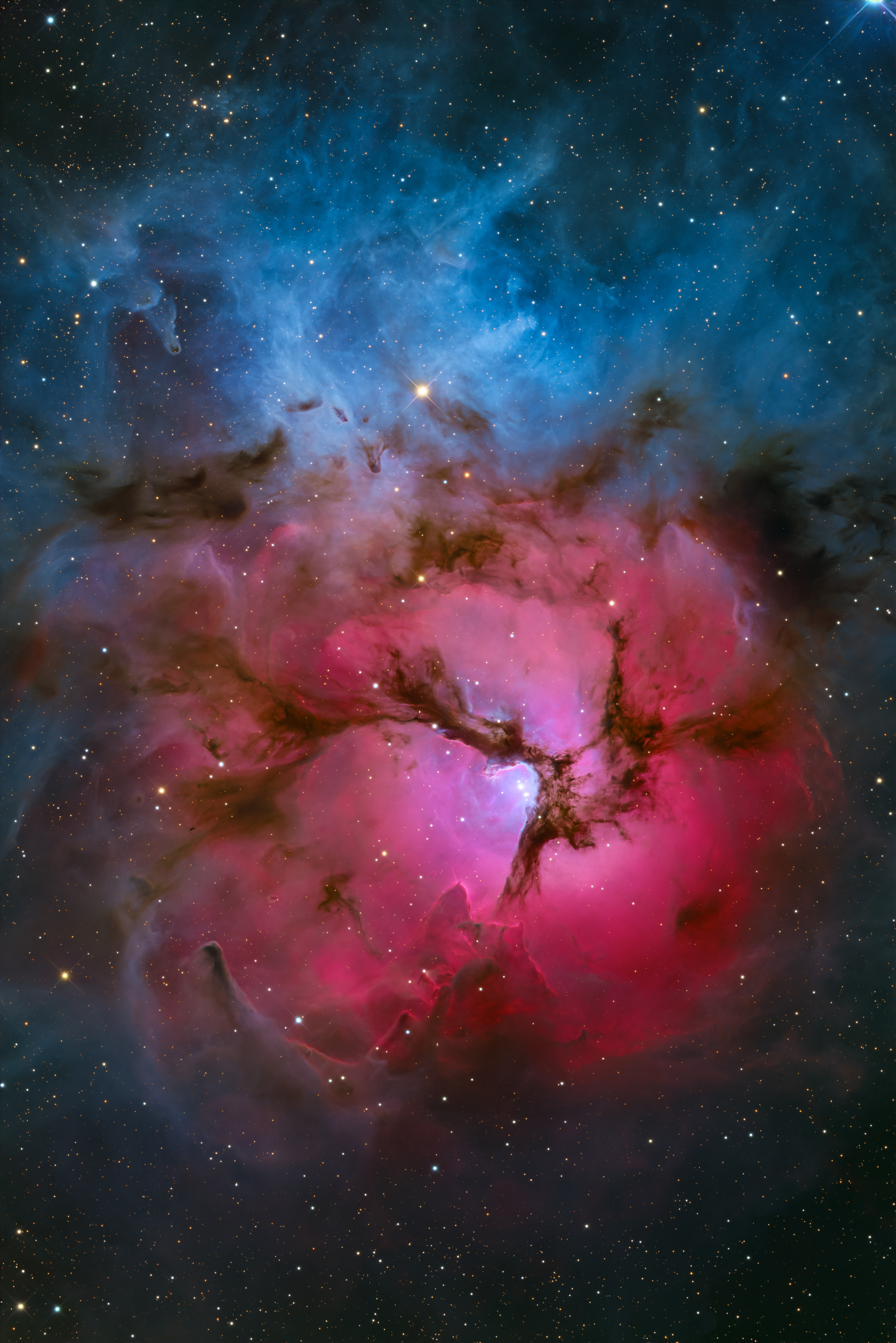
Broadband RGB image of the Trifid Nebula (Messier 20), acquired in 2026 with a 0.6-meter RC Optical Systems telescope at ObsTech, Chile.

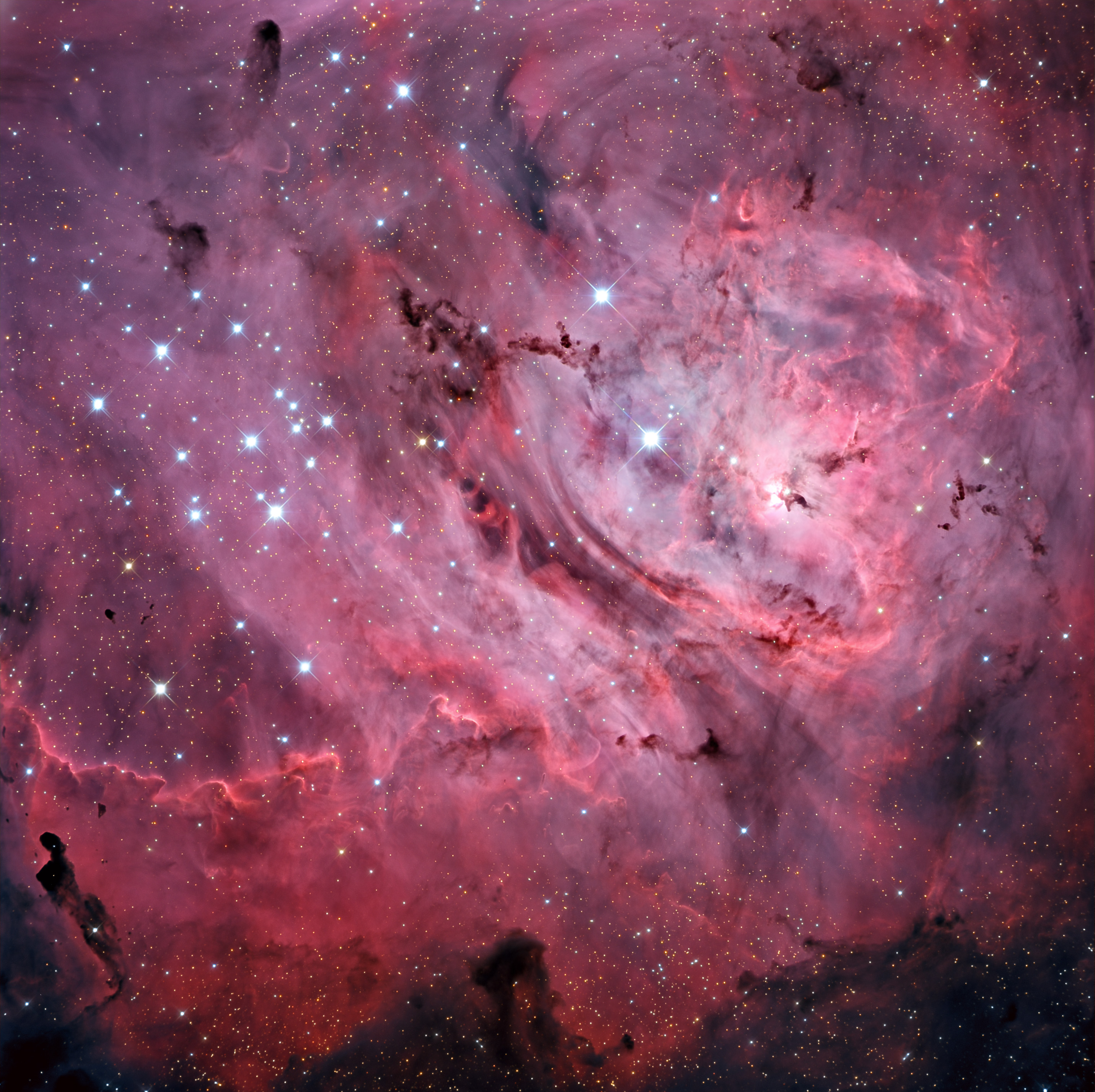
Lagoon Nebula, 32-inch Schulman Telescope

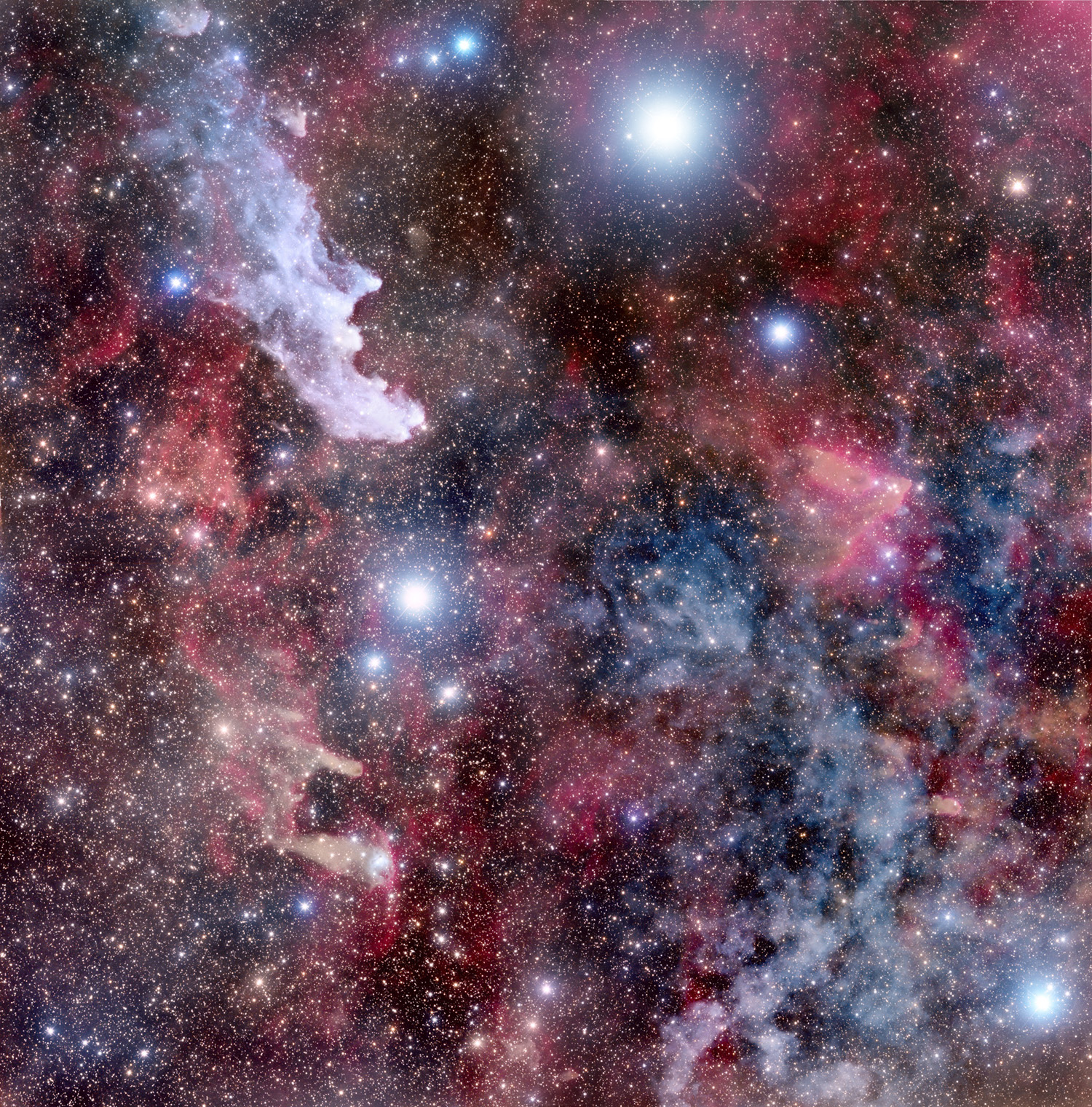
Nebula IC 2118 and Witchhead Region near Rigel, Pomenis Astrograph

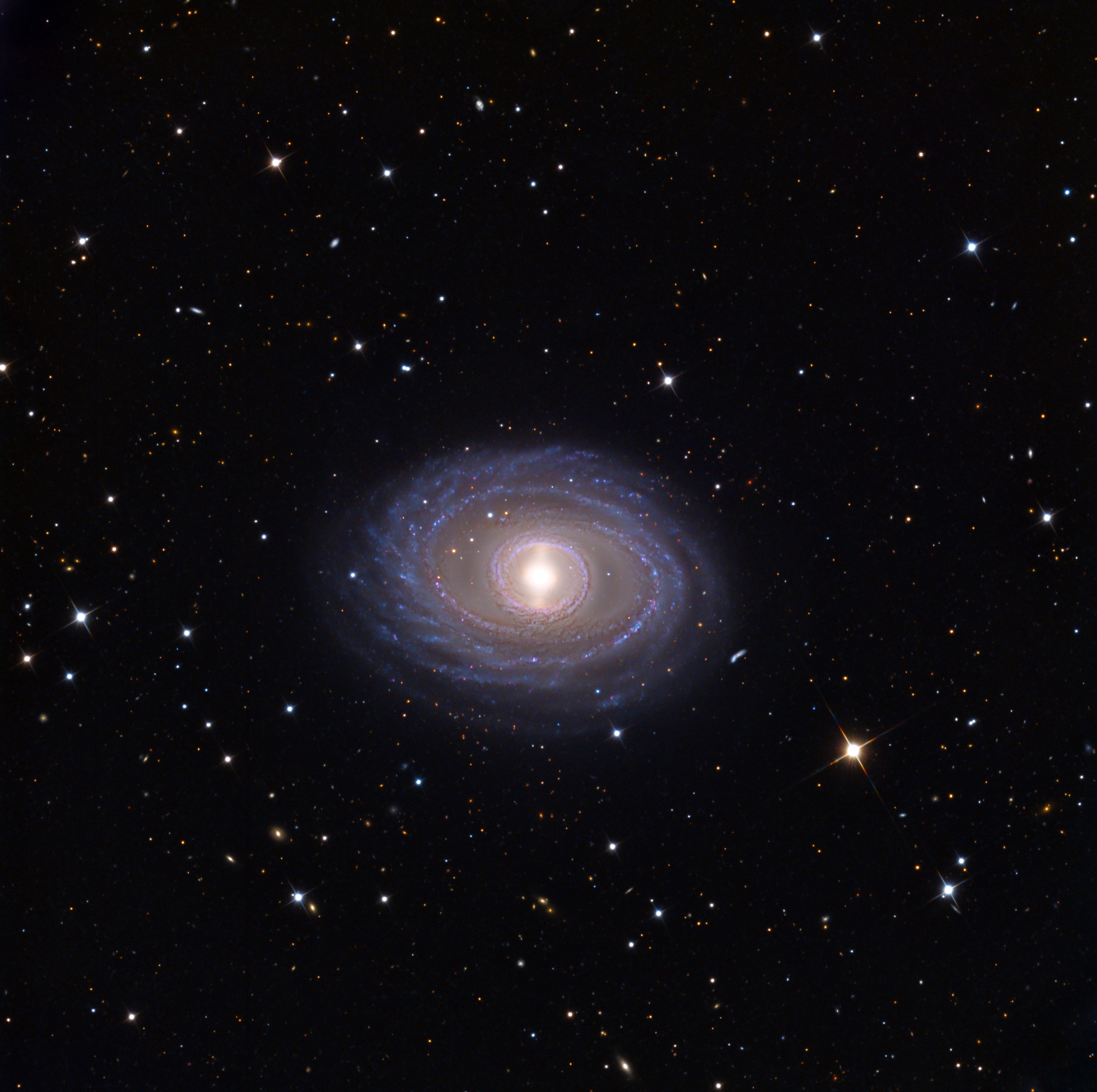
Galaxy NGC 1398, 32-inch Schulman Telescope

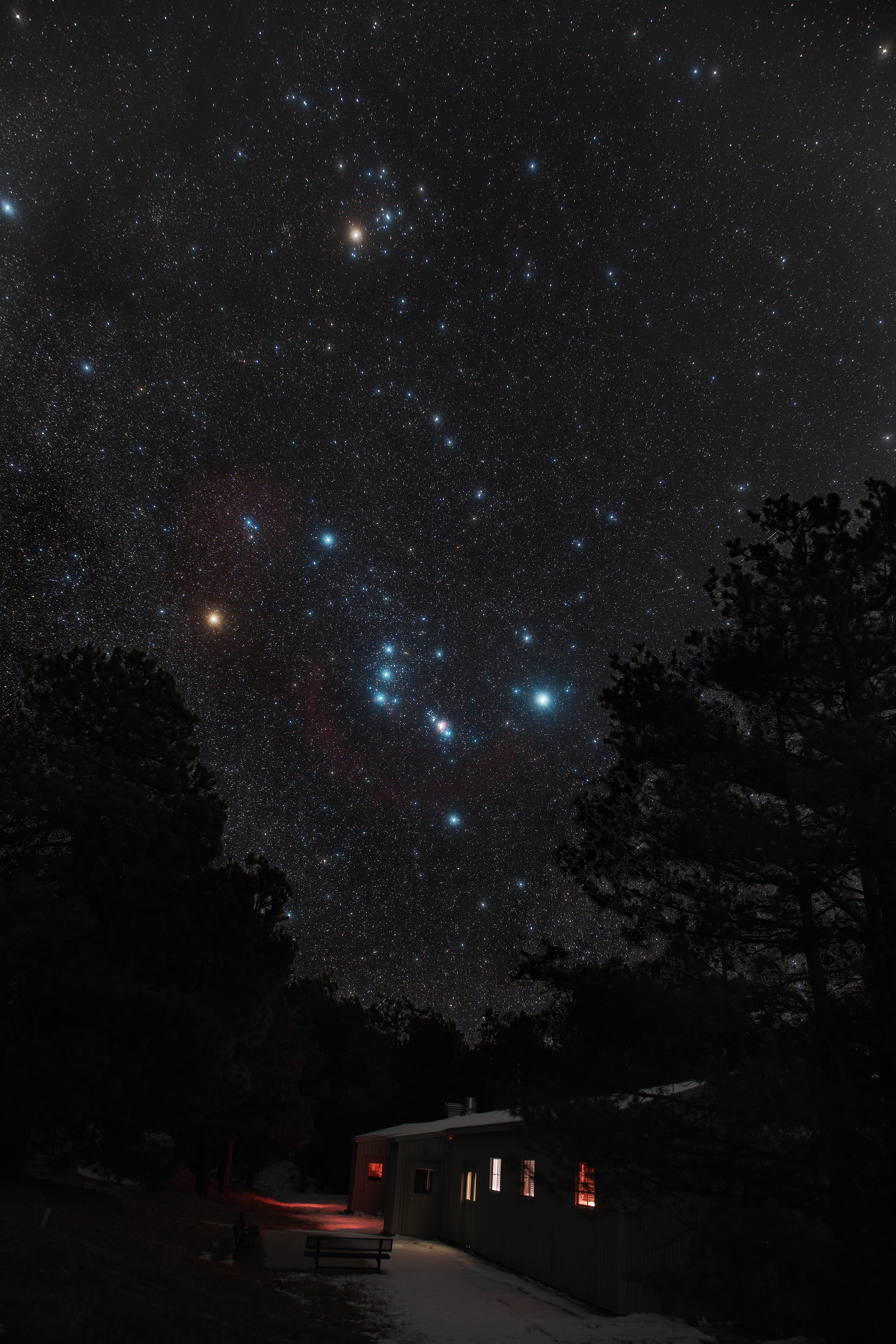
Orion starry winter scene, Canon EF 24mm-105mm Zoom lens
