= Sharon Block (scholar) =

American academic

Sharon Block is an American academic who specializes in the history of race in early American history.

== Biography ==
Block got a BA and MA (1990) in history from University of Pennsylvania, and a Ph.D. in history from Princeton University in 1995. As of 2023, Block is a professor of history at University of California, Irvine, and associate vice provost for Equity, Diversity, and Inclusion. In 2020-21 she was a fellow at the Center for Advanced Study in the Behavioral Sciences, at Stanford University.

== Academic work ==
Block is the author of Colonial Complexions: Race and Bodies in Eighteenth-Century America (U of Pennsylvania P, 2018), which studies how people's appearances were described in missing persons advertisements (for runaway servants and enslaved people, for instance) in thirty-nine newspaper colonial America, to assess what descriptors of color were used prior to the solidification of racial categories in the nineteenth century. Her research question is what terms of color (black, white, red, etc.) meant in that time period. She notes that in the eighteenth century complexion, skin color, and race cannot be equated. Earlier ads showed that descriptors were based on humorism, with complexions indicating health status and productivity; the idea that a red or white complexion indicated health disappeared as "red" came to be used for Native Americans, for instance. Women of African descent were often described in hypersexualized terms, and as the century progressed more and more racialized coding happened: "height", for instance, was a marker of health for indentured servants, but was used to indicate monetary value and productivity for enslaved African women.

Nora Doyle, reviewing the book for The American Historical Review, said "Block's work is important both for its innovative methodological approach and for its precise analysis of the complex and fluid relationship between perceptions of bodies and categories of identity."

== Published books ==
- Colonial Complexions: Race and Bodies in Eighteenth-Century America (U of Pennsylvania P, 2018)
- Rape and Sexual Power in Early America (Omohundro Institute of Early American History and Culture and the U of North Carolina P, 2006)
