= Peter Block (disambiguation) =

Peter Block (born 1939) is an American author, consultant, and speaker.

Peter Block may also refer to:

- Peter Block (ice hockey) (1933–2015), American founder, owner, executive for the Pittsburgh Penguins, 1967–1968 and 1971–1975
- Peter Block (politician) (1935–1992), Australian actor, golfer and politician
