= Jeanne Block =

American psychologist (1923–1981)

Jeanne Humphrey Block
- Born: July 17, 1923; Tulsa, Oklahoma
- Died: December 4, 1981 (aged 58)
- Education: Stanford University
- Spouse: Jack Block
- Scientific career
- Fields: Psychology
- Workplaces: University of California, Berkeley

Jeanne Lavonne Humphrey Block (July 17, 1923 – December 4, 1981) was an American psychologist and expert on child development. She conducted research on sex-role socialization and theories of personality. Block was a fellow of the American Association for the Advancement of Science and conducted her research with the National Institute of Mental Health and the University of California, Berkeley. She retired in 1981 after being diagnosed with cancer, and died in December of the same year.

== Early life and education ==
Block was born in 1923 in Tulsa, Oklahoma. She was raised in a small town in Oregon. After graduating from high school, she entered Oregon State University as a home economics major, but she was dissatisfied with her education. She joined SPARS, the women's branch of the United States Coast Guard, in 1944. While serving in World War II, Block was badly burned and nearly died. She was treated with skin grafts, and she was able to return to military service until 1946.

In 1947, after completing a psychology degree at Reed College, she attended graduate school at Stanford University. At Stanford, Block met two mentors, Ernest Hilgard and Maud Merrill. Hilgard wrote a popular general psychology textbook and co-wrote a textbook on learning theories, and he became president of the American Psychological Association. James had been an associate of intelligence researcher Lewis Terman. Block also met her future husband and research collaborator, Jack Block, during her time at Stanford.

== Career ==
Block finished her Ph.D. at Stanford in 1951 while pregnant, and worked mostly part-time through the 1950s while raising four children. Block and her husband created a person-centered personality theory that became popular among personality researchers. The theory examined personality in terms of two variables, ego-resiliency (the ability to respond flexibly to changing situations) and ego-control (the ability to suppress impulses). In 1963, she was awarded a National Institute of Mental Health Special Research fellowship and spent a year in Norway with her family. Upon her return, Block was involved in research on moral beliefs and values of student activists. She joined the faculty at the University of California, Berkeley Institute of Human Development in 1968 as a research psychologist. That same year, she & her husband began the Block Study, a 30-year longitudinal study of 128 children in the San Francisco Bay Area. Just over ten years later, the Block Study was featured on a PBS television program title, "The Pinks and the Blues." The episode focused on Jeanne Block's work regarding gender roles. She became a professor-in-residence in the department of psychology in 1979.

In the 1970s, Block published an analysis on sex-role socialization occurring in several groups of children from the United States and six Northern European countries. She found that across countries, boys were typically raised to be independent, high-achieving and unemotional, while girls were generally encouraged to express feelings, to foster close relationships and to pursue typical feminine ideals.

Through her later career, Block received multiple awards and recognition of her work. In 1972, she was appointed as the Bernard Moses Memorial Lecturer at U.C. Berkeley. Block received the Lester N. Hofheimer Prize for outstanding psychiatric research from the American Psychological Association (APA) in 1979 and was elected president of the APA Division of Developmental Psychology. In 1980 she was elected a fellow of the American Association for the Advancement of Science.

In 1984 her book, Sex Role Identity and Ego Development was published posthumously.

== Death ==
Block died at the Alta Bates Hospital in Berkeley on December 4, 1981. She had been diagnosed with cancer earlier that year. She was survived by her husband, Jack, who died in 2010, four children, her brother and mother.
