= Stanley Block =

American academic

Stanley B. Block (born 1939) is an American academic who is Emeritus Professor of Finance at Texas Christian University (TCU) in Fort Worth, Texas. He is best known as coauthor with Geoffrey Hirt of numerous books in finance, including Foundations of Financial Management and Fundamentals of Investment Management. The first-mentioned text has sold over a million copies.

== Education ==
Block received his bachelor's degree from the University of Texas at Austin in 1961. He received an MBA from Cornell University in 1964 and a Ph.D. from Louisiana State University in 1967.

== Career ==
He has published articles in such journals as Financial Management, the Journal of Financial Services Research, the Journal of Portfolio Management, the Journal of Accountancy, the Financial Analysts Journal, and the Journal of Finance. He is past president of the Southwestern Finance Association and a former director of the Financial Management Association.

== Awards ==
At TCU he has twice won the award as the outstanding instructor in the MBA Program; the Dean’s Teaching Award; and the Distinguished Teacher Award for the M.J. Neeley School of Business in the year 2002. In 2006, he was selected for the Chancellor’s Award as the University’s Outstanding Professor.
