= Marjorie Bloch =

Irish painter

Marjorie Bloch (born 1956) is an Irish painter who currently lives and works in Belfast, Northern Ireland. She was educated at Ulster University and Queen's University Belfast.

Her work can be found in the Ulster Museum collections and she exhibited in the Royal Ulster Academy (Belfast); the Royal Hibernian Academy (Dublin); and the Royal Academy of Arts (London). She had a solo exhibition, "As Above So Below", at the Engine Room Gallery, Belfast, in 2017.
