= Isabelle Bloch =

French computer scientist

Isabelle Bloch (also published as Isabelle Bloch-Boulanger) is a French computer scientist working in artificial intelligence, image understanding, explainable artificial intelligence, and spatial reasoning. She is a professor in LIP6, the computer science laboratory of Sorbonne University, where she holds the Artificial Intelligence Chair.

== Education and career ==
Bloch is a 1986 graduate of Mines ParisTech. After a 1987 master's degree from Paris-East Créteil University, she completed a Ph.D. from Télécom Paris in 1990, and continued at Télécom Paris as a professor and researcher beginning in 1991.

In 1995 she earned a habilitation through Paris Descartes University. She moved to her present position at Sorbonne University in 2020.

== Recognition ==
Bloch was the 2008 recipient of the Blondel Medal of the French Société de l'électricité, de l'électronique et des technologies de l'information et de la communication (SEE). She is a fellow of the European Association for Artificial Intelligence.

She was named a knight in the Legion of Honour in 2021.
