= Benjamin Block =

German-Hungarian Baroque painter

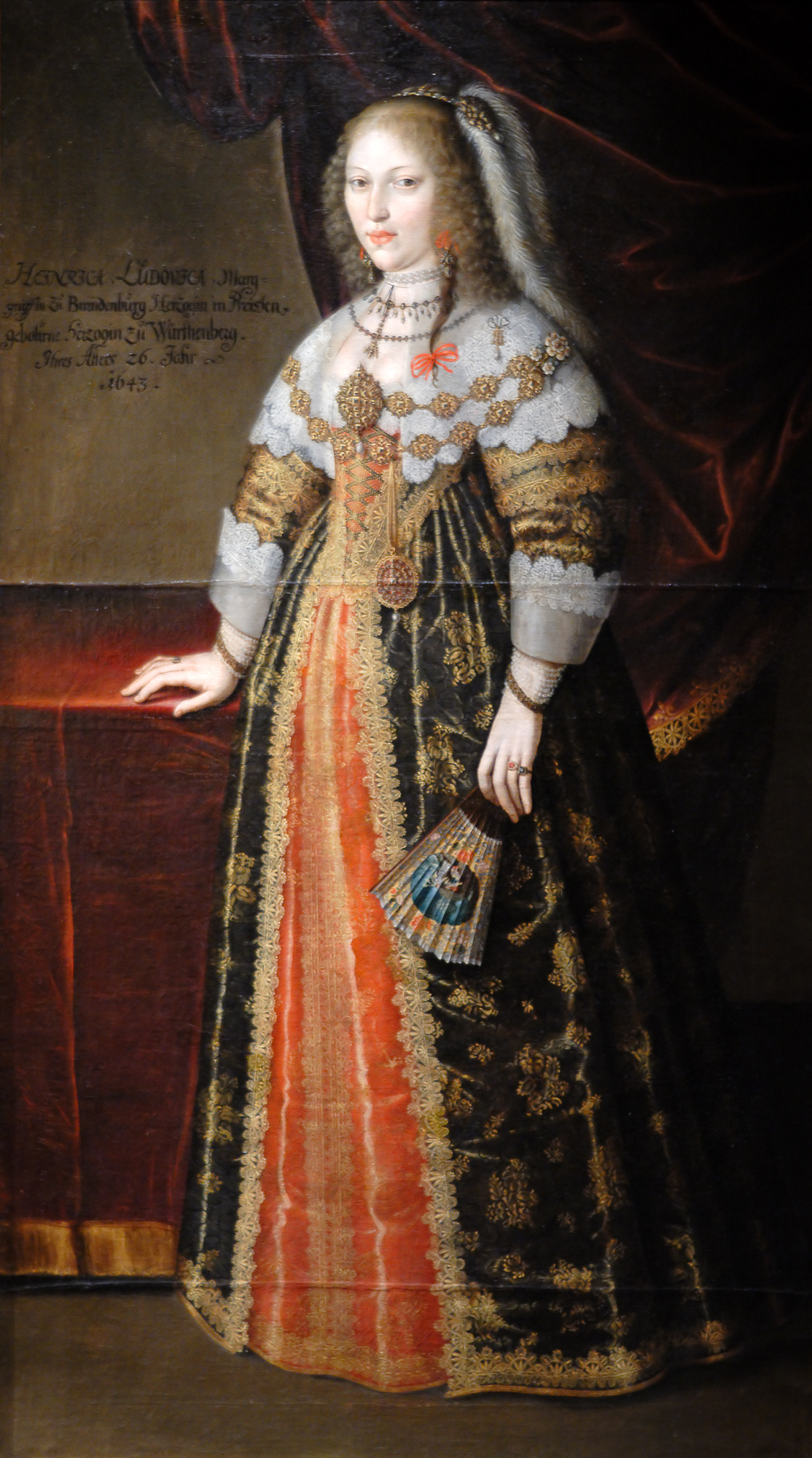
Benjamin Block, Portrait of Henriette Luise von Württemberg, 1643

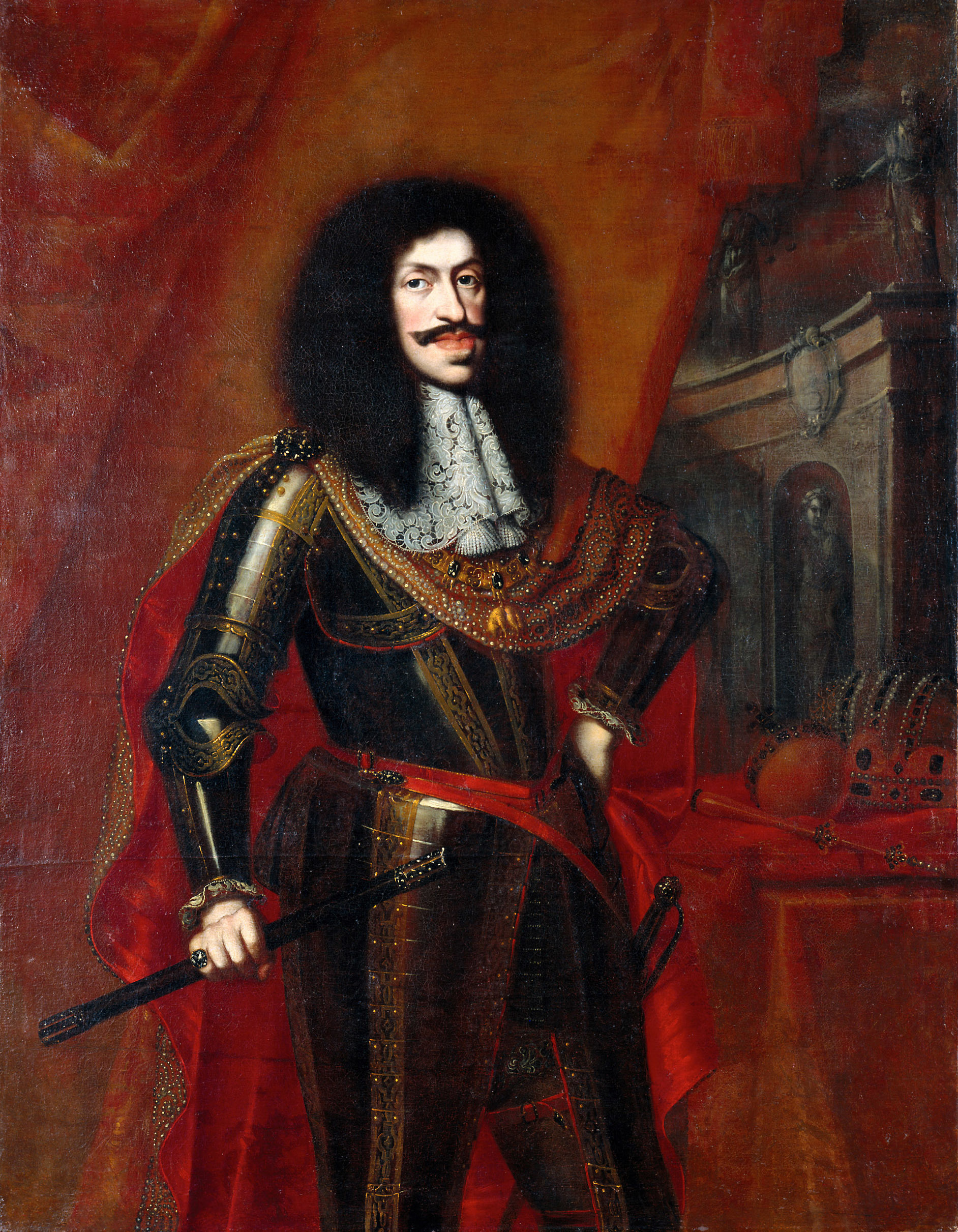
Leopold I, by Block, in 1672

Benjamin Block or Blok (1631–1690) was a seventeenth-century German-Hungarian Baroque painter who married the flower painter Anna Katharina Block. He is known for his portrait paintings.

== Biography ==
Block was born into an artistic family in Lübeck; his father Daniel Blok and brothers Emanuel and Adolf were painters. In 1653 he was registered in Halle, Spanish Netherlands, probably en route to Italy, and in 1655, through one of his brothers, who was a canon in Vienna at the time, he met Ferenc Nádasdy III who invited him to produce art in Hungary. He is registered in Hungary from 1656 to 1659.

After working as a portrait painter in Siena, Florence and Venice, in 1664 Block crossed the alps back to his native Germany, and settled in Nuremberg, where he married the daughter of the flower painter Johann Thomas Fischer (1603–1685), the flower painter Anna Catharina Fischer. There he made portraits for the margraves of Ansbach and the Vienna court until 1670. He was knighted by Leopold I, Holy Roman Emperor in 1684.

His wife remained a painter after her marriage, and along with their parents, this duo is mentioned in the artist biographies of Joachim von Sandrart and Arnold Houbraken. He died in Regensburg in 1690.

== External links and sources ==
- Fine Arts in Hungary
