= Miriam Block =

German politician (born 1990)

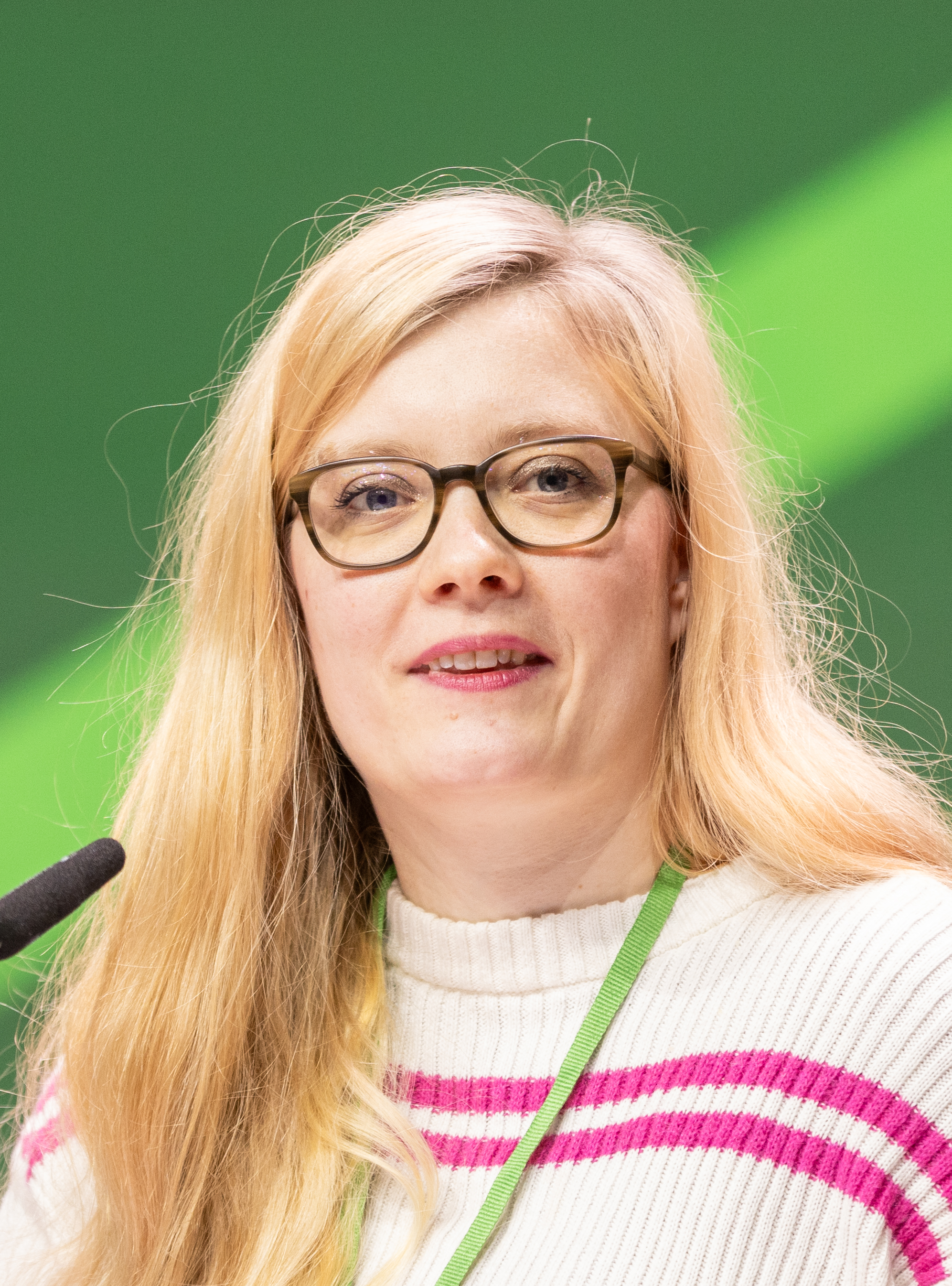
- Block in 2023

Member of the Hamburg Parliament
- Incumbent
- Assumed office 18 March 2020

Personal details
- Born: 2 July 1990 (age 36) Hamburg
- Party: Alliance 90/The Greens

Miriam Block (born 2 July 1990 in Hamburg) is a German politician serving as a member of the Hamburg Parliament since 2020. She has served as spokesperson for queer and labour market policy of the Alliance 90/The Greens group since 2025.
