= Samuel Block =

Samuel Block may refer to:

- Samuel W. Block (1911–1970), American lawyer
- Samuel Richard Block (died 1864), English merchant
