= Adam Block (music critic) =

American writer and music critic (1951–2008)

Adam Parker Block (February 7, 1951 – January 27, 2008) was a San Francisco–based writer and music critic for The Advocate, for which he wrote a regular column entitled Block on Rock. He interviewed numerous pop stars as well as lesser known music artists, helping to raise awareness of the emerging queercore movement.

He died of pulmonary illness due to AIDS on January 27, 2008, aged 56, in San Francisco, California.
