= Ken Block (disambiguation) =

Ken Block (1967–2023) was an American rally driver and co-founder of DC Shoes.

Ken Block may also refer to:

- Ken Block (ice hockey) (born 1944), Canadian ice hockey player
- Ken Block (politician) (born 1965), American founder of the Moderate Party of Rhode Island; candidate for Governor of Rhode Island
- Ken Block, American musician from the rock band Sister Hazel
- Kenneth Paul Block (1924–2009), American fashion illustrator
