= Frank Block (American politician) =

American politician

Frank Block is a Wilmington, North Carolina attorney, a trustee of the University of North Carolina at Wilmington, and a former state senator.

Block created the Charles and Hannah Block Distinguished Scholar in Jewish History chair at the University of North Carolina, Wilmington, in honour of his parents, Charles and Hannah Block, in 2010.
