= Isaac Bloch =

French rabbi

Isaac Bloch (1848–1925) served as Chief Rabbi in Nancy, France. He wrote 16 articles for the Jewish Encyclopedia.

Bloch was a native of Alsace. He served as a chaplain during the siege of Paris. For most of the 1880s he served as a rabbi in Algeria. He was appointed chief rabbi of Nancy in 1890.
