= Journal of Consumer Psychology =

Quarterly peer-reviewed academic journal

- Discipline: Psychology
- Language: English
- Edited by: Lauren Goldberg Block

Publication details
- History: 1992–present
- Publisher: John Wiley & Sons
- Frequency: Quarterly
- Impact factor: 3.385 (2016)

Standard abbreviations
- ISO 4: J. Consum. Psychol.

Indexing
- ISSN: 1057-7408

Links
- Journal homepage; Online access; Online archive

The Journal of Consumer Psychology is a quarterly peer-reviewed academic journal covering psychology as it relates to consumer behavior. It was established in 1992 and is published by John Wiley & Sons on behalf of the Society for Consumer Psychology, the 23rd division of the American Psychological Association. The editor-in-chief is Lauren Goldberg Block (Baruch College). According to the Journal Citation Reports, the journal has a 2016 impact factor of 3.385.
