= Jack Block =

Personality psychologist

- Born: April 28, 1924
- Died: January 13, 2010 (aged 85)
- Occupations: Psychologist, academic

Jacob "Jack" Block (April 28, 1924 – January 13, 2010) was a psychology professor at UC Berkeley. His main areas of research were personality theory, personality development, research methodology, personality assessment, longitudinal research, and cognition. He often collaborated with his wife Jeanne Block.

Block was born in Brooklyn, New York, and received a bachelor's degree from Brooklyn College. He earned his Ph.D. from Stanford University in 1950. He received many awards over the years and was a fellow of the American Association for the Advancement of Science.

== Block Study ==
His most renowned body of work, undertaken primarily with his wife, was a longitudinal study on a cohort of more than 100 San Francisco Bay Area toddlers, the Block Study or Block Project. They studied the children regularly for nearly 30 years. Unlike most longitudinal studies, the Blocks' focused on the psychological makeup and history of the subjects, rather than quantitative measures such as IQ. The study tracked how the subjects' background influenced their later choices and the outcomes of their lives.

One of Block's studies drew particular notice in the news media. Published in The Journal of Research in Personality in 2006, it found that subjects who at 3 years old had seemed thin-skinned, rigid, inhibited and vulnerable tended at 23 to be political conservatives. On the other hand, 3-year-olds characterized as self-reliant, energetic, somewhat dominating and resilient were inclined to become liberals.

== Book publications ==
- "The Q-Sort Method in Personality Assessment and Psychiatric Research", 1961
- "The Challenge of Response Sets", 1965
- Lives Through Time, 1971
- Personality as an Affect-Processing System, 2002
- The Q-Sort in Character Appraisal, 2008
