= Dupuy (surname) =

Dupuy, also spelt DuPuy, DePuy or De Puy (American spelling), and in its old form du Puy, is originally a French surname centered in Aquitaine, dating back to medieval times. Translated, the name means "of a puy", puy being a "height" in Old French. In Aquitaine and in the south of France, it is more generally a frenchification of its original Occitan forms such as Delpech, Delpuech and half frenchified forms (article) Dupech, Dupuch, Dupey. They all share the same meaning and etymology. The surname Dupuis / Du Puis is seemingly unrelated; it is widespread in northern France and means "of the well".

== Dupuy ==
- Albert Dupuy (born 1947), French civil servant
- Bob DuPuy (born c. 1947), President and Chief Operating Officer of Major League Baseball
- Charles Dupuy (1851–1923), French statesman and three time Prime Minister of France
- Charlotte Dupuy (c. 1788–1866), African American enslaved by Henry Clay
- Claude Dupuy (bishop) (1901–1989), Archbishop of Albi
- Claude Dupuy (jurist) (1545–1594), Parisian jurist, humanist and bibliophile
- Claude-Thomas Dupuy (1678–1738), Intendant of New France from 1726 to 1728
- Dessi Dupuy (born 1993), Bulgarian footballer
- Dominique Dupuy (biologist) (1812–1885), French zoologist and botanist
- Dominique Dupuy (racing driver) (born 1957), French race driver
- Eliza Ann Dupuy (ca. 1814–1880), American author
- Jean Dupuy (disambiguation), various persons
- Jean-Pierre Dupuy (born 1941), professor of social and political philosophy
- Kléber Dupuy (1892–1966), French army officer
- Michel Dupuy (1930–2023), Canadian diplomat, journalist, academic and politician from Quebec
- Paul Dupuy (1856–1948), history lecturer at the Ecole Normale
- Philippe Dupuy of Dupuy and Berberian, French cartoonist and co-creator of Monsieur Jean
- Pierre Dupuy (scholar) (1582–1651), French scholar
- Richard Ernest Dupuy (1887–1975), American, journalist, army officer and military historian
- Roger Dupuy (1934–2025), French historian and academic
- Tina Dupuy, American syndicated political columnist, humorist and writer
- Trevor N. Dupuy (1916–1995), American military historian

== Du Puy ==
- Édouard Du Puy (1770–1822), Principality of Neuchâtel-born singer, composer, director, and violinist
- Gérard du Puy (died 1389), French Roman Catholic cardinal
- Géraud du Puy (died 1420), French Roman Catholic bishop, politician and diplomat
- Imbert du Puy (died 1348), French cardinal, nephew of Pope John XXII
- Raymond du Puy (c. 1083–1160), Holy Roman Empire knight and second grand master of the Knights Hospitaller
- Raphael du Puy (1009–1062), Grand Chamberlain to Emperor Conrad II

== De Puy or DePuy ==
- Charles H. De Puy (1842–1935), American Civil War soldier awarded the Medal of Honor
- Charles H. DePuy (chemist) (1927–2013), American chemist
- Duarte de Puy (c. 1125–11?), Portuguese nobleman and ambassador of Pope Clement II
- Frank A. De Puy (1854-1927), American journalist and editor for The New York Times
- Jason De Puy (born 1990), stage name Salina EsTitties, American drag queen
- Revra DePuy (1860–1921), American inventor and company founder
- William E. DePuy (1919–1992), American general

== See also ==
- María del Puy, stage name of Spanish actress María del Puy Alonso González (1941–2015)
- Dupuy (disambiguation)
