= Puy (disambiguation) =

Puy is a geological term used locally in the Auvergne, France. Puy may also refer to:

== People ==
- Ana Tena Puy (born 1966), Aragonese writer
- Jean Puy (1876–1960), French painter
- Joseph Puy (1907–1980), French racing cyclist
- Ludivine Puy (born 1983), French motorcycle racer
- Puy Oria (born 1962), Spanish film producer

== Other uses ==
- Puy (society), a type of society, often organised as a guild or confraternity, during the Middle Ages and the Renaissance
- PUY, IATA airport code form Pula Airport, serving the city of Pula, Croatia

== See also ==
- Le Puy (disambiguation)
- Dupuy (disambiguation)
  - Du Puy or Dupuy (surname)
- Duarte de Puy (c. 1125–11?), Portuguese nobleman and ambassador of Pope Clement II
- Jason De Puy (born 1990), stage name Salina EsTitties, American drag queen
- María del Puy, stage name of Spanish actress María del Puy Alonso González (1941–2015)
- Chaîne des Puys, a chain of cinder cones, lava domes, and maars in the Massif Central of France
- Puy Manuscript, a musical manuscript of church music from the 12th to 16the centuries
