= Julie Harrison (visual artist) =

American visual artist (born 1952)

Julie Harrison (born June 6, 1952, Baltimore, Maryland) is an American visual artist based in New York City and the Hudson Valley. Over a career spanning more than five decades, she has worked in video, drawing, photography, painting, and performance. She is known for abstract drawings that incorporate microscopic biological imagery, and for her earlier work in analog video and as a member of the New York artists' collective Colab.

== Early life and education ==
Harrison was born at Johns Hopkins Hospital in Baltimore, Maryland, and grew up in Rockville, Maryland, in a household where art and music were central to family life; her father was a composer, and her parents and grandparents painted as hobbyists. She attended the University of New Mexico in Albuquerque, earning a Bachelor of Arts degree from its School of Fine Art in 1975, performed with New Mexico Danceworks, and, in 1974, made her first video work using the Sony Portapak analog video system. She earned a Master of Arts degree from New York University's Steinhardt School (formerly the School of Education and Art Professions) in 1980.

== Career ==
=== Early video and performance (1974–1984) ===
Harrison moved to New York City in 1976 and became active in the downtown avant-garde scene. She worked with dancer Simone Forti in 1978, culminating in a performance of Forti's Huddle at the Museum of Modern Art (MoMA) Summergarden, and participated in Grommet events organized by Fluxus artist Jean Dupuy. Her early performance work was reviewed by Noël Carroll in the SoHo Weekly News (1979).

Her video work developed partly through extended residencies at the Experimental Television Center (ETC) in Owego, New York, work noted by critic Shalom Gorewitz in a 1983 review in The Independent Magazine. Her single-channel work Boundary (1980), co-made with Neil Zusman, won first prize at the Athens Film and Video Festival (1981), an honorable mention at the Atlanta Film & Video Festival, and a Creative Artists Public Service (CAPS) fellowship that included a traveling exhibition to over twenty venues. The work was screened at the American Film Institute and the Toronto Film Festival. The work was also shown at the Centre Georges Pompidou, Paris, and the Staatliche Kunsthalle Baden-Baden, Germany.

Writing in The Village Voice in 1984, video art critic Ann Sargent-Wooster included Harrison in her column "Video as Canvas #2." A subsequent Village Voice piece in 1990 by film and video critic Amy Taubin, "Let's Talk About Sex," also discussed Harrison's work. Harrison's video work received additional coverage in The Independent ("In & Out of Production," Mary Guzzy, October 1985). John Richardson reviewed her work in the Albuquerque Tribune in December 1985. Harrison also curated "New Definitions," a festival of dance videos for Dance on the Lower East Side.

Her documentary Positive Images: Portraits of Women With Disabilities, made with Harilyn Rousso, won the Gold Award at the National Educational Film and Video Festival and is distributed by Women Make Movies. It was reviewed in professional library journals including Library Journal ("Nonprint Materials," Judith Kessee, 1989) and Booklist (Nancy McCray, 1989 and 1990).

Harrison's early works were included in Tellus Audio Cassette Magazine, the New York experimental media publication co-founded by Joseph Nechvatal, Carol Parkinson, and Claudia Gould. Harrison contributed to Tellus #5 & 6 (the double "Audio Visual" issue, 1984) and Tellus #17 ("Video Art Music," 1987), the latter featuring her work alongside Woody Vasulka, among others. Tellus is now recognized as a historically significant archive of the downtown New York experimental scene; selections were included in MoMA's Looking at Music 3.0 exhibition in 2011, and the series received coverage in Artforum and ARTnews.

=== Collaborative Projects (Colab) ===
From 1977 to 1984, Harrison was a member of Collaborative Projects (Colab), a New York artists' collective whose members included Kiki Smith, Jenny Holzer, Tom Otterness, and others. She participated in the group's theme shows and worked on the artists' cable television program Potato Wolf, broadcast on Manhattan Cable Television. Harrison is pictured in archival group photographs of Colab members, now held in gallery and research collections.

Her participation in Colab is documented in A Book About Colab (and Related Activities) (2nd edition, edited by Max Schumann, Printed Matter, New York, 2016), which traces the collective's output from the late 1970s through the mid-1980s. Her work also appeared in M/E/A/N/I/N/G #5: 25th Anniversary Edition (edited by Mira Schor and Susan Bee, Duke University Press, 2000), a critical art journal engaging feminist and theoretical perspectives on contemporary art practice.

Critic and fellow Colab member Joseph Nechvatal, writing in Hyperallergic in 2015, recalled knowing Harrison "since the late 1970s from our early days with Colab," noting that throughout their parallel careers both had been "embracing new technologies and denouncing the ghettoization of tech-based art."

=== Teaching ===
From 1992 to 2010, Harrison taught at Stevens Institute of Technology in Hoboken, New Jersey. She founded and directed the Art & Technology B.A. program there from 2003 to 2010. In 2008 Harrison co-produced and co-curated, with Julie Martin Klüver, "Experiments in Art and Technology Revisited," an exhibition and accompanying symposium at the institute in collaboration with Harvestworks.

== Artistic practice ==
=== Painting and photography (1980s–2016) ===
In the 1980s Harrison turned to painting, and in 1993, while in residence at Central Michigan University, she purchased her first Macintosh computer to convert video stills into digital images, merging her time-based video and two-dimensional practices. She spent the following two decades working primarily in two-dimensional digital media, culminating in the Global Portraits, Weather, and War series (2003–2015) — large-format photographs created by moving a camera with a macro lens over print magazine pages, produced without collage or computer manipulation. A limited-edition artist book and a trade book of this work were both published by Granary Books (New York). The artist book If It Rained Here (with Joe Elliot) was reviewed in the Journal of Artists' Books and in New Pages Reviews (Denise Bazzett, 2002). A solo exhibition of the Fragments work was presented at Wekalet Behna, Alexandria, Egypt, in 2015, with a catalogue essay by Joseph Nechvatal.

=== Microbial and biomorphic drawings (2017–present) ===
In 2017 Harrison returned to drawing and developed her ongoing series of abstract drawings combining graphite, India ink, and ink-jet prints with re-photographed imagery sourced from electron microscopy, maps, cellular biology, and brain imaging.

The Brain Series focuses specifically on neurological imagery, drawing on Golgi stains — a laboratory method of isolating and making visible individual nerve cells — as well as scanning electron microscope (SEM) photography sourced from neuroscience research. Harrison developed the series in part during a residency at Cold Spring Harbor Laboratory, endowed by Nobel Prize-winning chemist Wally Gilbert. Scholar Johanna Drucker, writing in her Substack series JD: ABCs (2022), observed that Harrison's Brain Series drawings are "more alive than one might imagine any static image could be," remarking that viewers do not so much look at the drawings as watch them. Writing in Interalia Magazine, Kimberly Lyons found Harrison "attuned to some essential, fluidly dynamic core aspect of organic life," placing her among artists who "newly transmit awareness of ecological co-habitation." Writing in Whitehot Magazine in September 2024, former UN official and arts critic Siba Kumar Das reviewed Harrison's Landforms and Bodyscapes show and her Brain Series, describing the work as "addressing the relationship of the physical to the mental," and finding in her coastal and landform drawings "a Zen-like allusiveness that reveals fractal geometries." Writing in Gallery&Studio in 2024, public historian and arts critic Kathleen Hulser characterized Harrison's engagement with brain science as "probing the philosophical divide between mind and matter," describing the Brain Series drawings as creating a liminal space between science and fiction. The series was shown at the Southern Vermont Arts Center (spring–summer 2024) and the Delaware Valley Arts Alliance (August–September 2024).

The Coastal Series, developed during a 2025 residency at NES Artist Residency in Skagaströnd, Iceland, draws on coastline maps combined with microscopic imagery to address climate vulnerability and ecological transformation. Granary Books published a limited-edition book of this work, Ghost Coast: A Hurricane Sandy Periplus of Lower Manhattan, in collaboration with poet E. J. McAdams.

== Exhibitions ==
According to the artist, she has participated in group exhibitions at institutions including MoMA, Museum of Arts and Design, the New Museum, Bronx Museum of the Arts, Neuberger Museum, Smith College Museum of Art, and the Museum of the Moving Image (all New York), and the Walker Art Center, as well as, in Germany, the Staatliche Museum (Baden-Baden), Münchner Stadtmuseum (Munich), and Museum für Angewandte Kunst (Frankfurt). Selected solo exhibitions include Landforms and Bodyscapes at the Southern Vermont Arts Center (2024) and the Delaware Valley Arts Alliance (2024), Julie Harrison: Body Language Inside Out at Crescent Tree Gallery, Claremont, California (2022), and Fragments at Wekalet Behna, Alexandria, Egypt (2015). Her work was included in "Echoes of Voynich" at Wönzimer Gallery, Los Angeles (2024), part of the Getty PST Art & Science Collide series, and "Make, Believe: The Maslow Collection and the Moving Image" at Marywood University (2018).

== Awards ==
- Colorado Video Award, First Prize — Athens Film and Video Festival (1981)
- Honorable Mention — Atlanta Film & Video Festival (1981)
- Creative Artists Public Service Award (CAPS) fellowship (1981)
- New York State Council on the Arts Media Grant (1985)
- Barbara Latham Memorial Award, School of the Art Institute of Chicago (1987)
- National Endowment for the Arts (1987, 2006)
- New York Foundation for the Arts, Video Fellowship (1988)
- Funding Exchange / Paul Robeson Fund (1988)
- Gold Apple, First Prize — National Educational Film & Video Festival (1990)
- Berkshire Taconic Community Foundation (2026)

== Collections ==
According to the artist, her work is held in the collections of institutions including the Getty Research Institute, the Library of Congress, Harvard University, Columbia University, and the Rose Goldsen Archive of New Media Art at Cornell University, among others.

== Publications ==
Harrison has published three artists' books with Granary Books (New York): Ghost Coast: A Hurricane Sandy Periplus of Lower Manhattan (2026, with E. J. McAdams); If It Rained Here (1997, with Joe Elliot); and Debtor's Prison (2001, with Lewis Warsh). She co-edited WAC Stats: The Facts About Women (The New Press, 1993, with Barbara Ess, Gail Vachon, and Andrea Blum) and contributed "Artist's Pages" (with Joe Elliot) to Leonardo: Journal of the International Society for Arts, Sciences and Technology (vol. 31, no. 4, 1998). Her video works appear on Tellus Audio Cassette Magazine issues #5 & 6 (1984) and #17 (1987). Her participation in Colab is documented in A Book About Colab (and Related Activities) (ed. Max Schumann, Printed Matter, 2016) and her work appears in M/E/A/N/I/N/G #5: 25th Anniversary Edition (ed. Mira Schor and Susan Bee).

== Critical reception ==
Harrison's work has been reviewed in The New York Times (Jack Anderson, 1981), The Village Voice (Ann Sargent-Wooster, 1982–1984; Amy Taubin, 1990), SoHo Weekly News (Noël Carroll, 1979), Hyperallergic (Joseph Nechvatal, 2015), Interalia Magazine (Kimberly Lyons, 2021), Gallery&Studio (Kathleen Hulser, 2024), and Whitehot Magazine (Siba Kumar Das, 2024). Lyons, writing in Interalia Magazine, described a continuity across Harrison's practice, finding that the bodies in her microorganism-based images echo the bodies in her earlier multimedia works. Hulser, in Gallery&Studio, characterized the Brain Series drawings as creating a liminal space between science and fiction. Nechvatal, in Hyperallergic, described her Fragments photographs as possibly emancipatory in their suggestive transformation of news media.
