= Dupuis (surname) =

Dupuis is originally a common French surname widespread in northern France, meaning "of / from a (house neighbouring) a well" (du puits).

== People with this name ==
- Alexandre Dupuis (born 1990), Canadian football player
- Albert Dupuis (1877–1967), Belgian composer
- Antony Dupuis (born 1973), French tennis player
- Bob Dupuis (born 1952), Canadian ice hockey player
- Charles-François Dupuis (1742–1809), French scientist
- Debbie Dupuis, Canadian statistician
- George Dupuis, cricketer of the late 18th century
- George Dupuis (cricketer, born 1835) (1835–1912), English schoolmaster, clergyman and cricketer
- Heleen Dupuis (born 1945), Dutch ethicist, professor, and politician
- Jacques Dupuis (politician), Quebec politician
- Jacques Dupuis (priest) (1923–2004), Belgian Jesuit
- Jean Dupuis, founder of Editions Dupuis, Belgian publisher of comics
- Jean Dupuis (1828–1912), French trader and explorer
- José Dupuis (1833–1900), Belgian-born singer of French opéra-bouffe
- Josée Dupuis, Canadian and American biostatistician
- Lori Dupuis (born 1972), Canadian ice hockey player
- Pascal Dupuis (born 1979), Canadian ice hockey player
- Philippe Dupuis (born 1985), Canadian ice hockey player
- Pierre Dupuis (sometimes spelled Dupuys) (1610–1682), French painter
- Roy Dupuis (born 1963), Quebec actor
- Sadie Dupuis (born 1988), American musician
- Stephan Dupuis, makeup artist
- Thomas Sanders Dupuis (1733–1796), English organist and composer
- Toon Dupuis (1877–1937), Dutch sculptor and medallist
- Yvon Dupuis (1926–2017), Quebec politician

== See also ==
- Jules Dupuit (1804–1866), French engineer and economist
- Dupuy (surname)
