= Le Puy =

Le Puy may refer to:

== Places in France ==
- Le Puy, Doubs, a commune
- Le Puy, Gironde, a commune
- Le Puy-Sainte-Réparade, Bouches-du-Rhône department, a commune
- Le Puy-en-Velay (also called Le Puy), Haute-Loire department, a prefecture
- Le Puy-Notre-Dame, Maine-et-Loire department

== People ==
- Adhemar of Le Puy (died 1098), Bishop of Le Puy-en-Velay and one of the principal figures of the First Crusade
- Roman of Le Puy, first lord of Oultrejordain in the Kingdom of Jerusalem from c. 1120 to c. 1126

== Other uses ==
- Le Puy Foot 43 Auvergne, or Le Puy, a football club in Le Puy-en-Velay
- Le Puy Cathedral, Le Puy-en-Velay, Auvergne, France
- Le Puy Mine, an ancient lead mine in the Massif Central, France
- Via Podiensis or Le Puy Route, one of the four routes through France on the pilgrimage to the tomb of St. James the Great in Santiago de Compostela, Galicia, Spain

== See also ==
- Puy (disambiguation)
