= Fort Souville =

- Fort de Souvile
- Part of Verdun Fortifications
- Fleury-devant-Douaumont, France
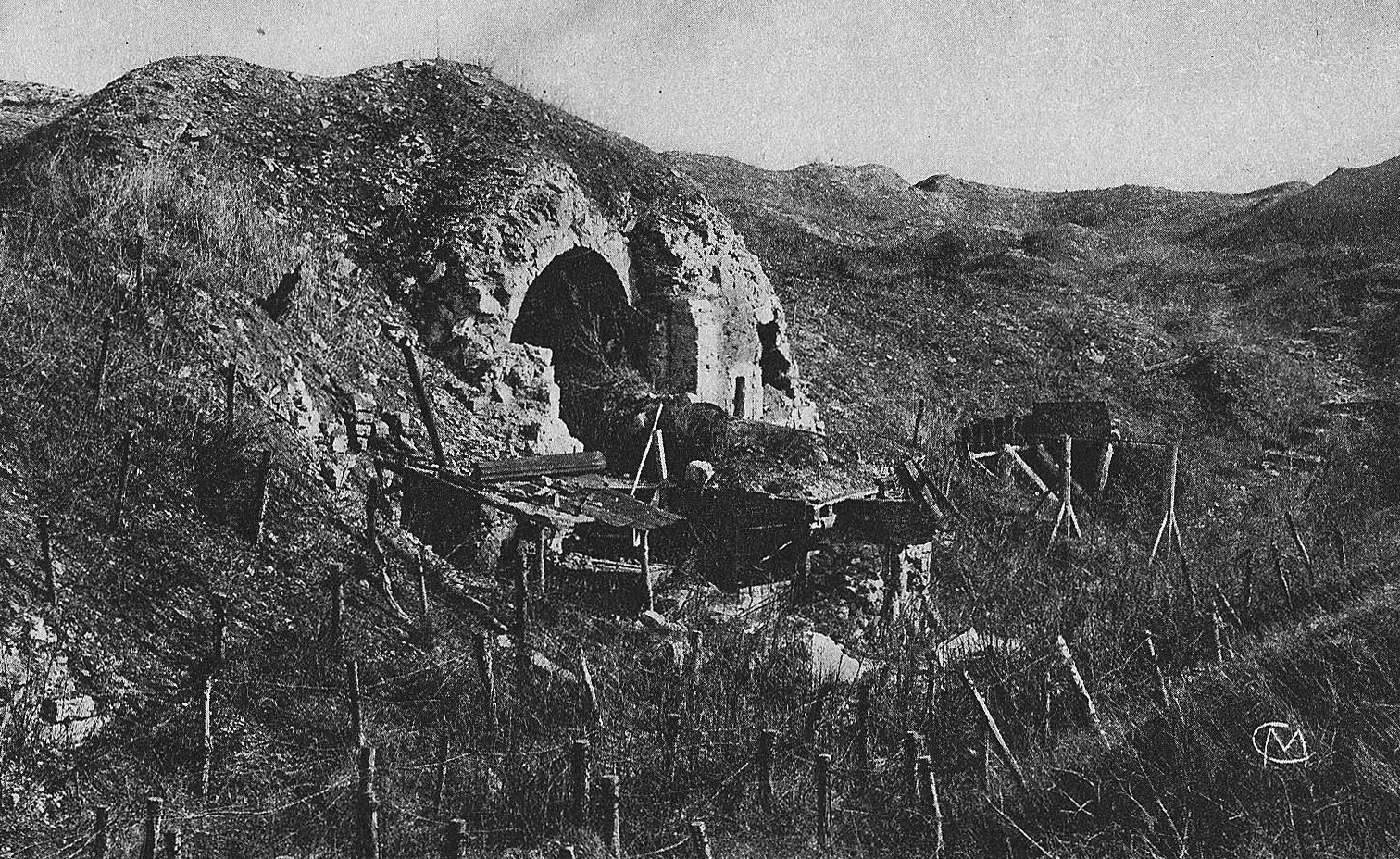
- A view of the fort, likely prior to World War 1.

Site information
- Type: Fort
- Controlled by: National Forests Office
- Open to the public: Yes
- Condition: Abandoned

Location
- Coordinates: 49.1880°N 5.4389°E

Site history
- Built: 1876-1879
- Built by: French Army
- In use: 1876-~1920
- Materials: Deep excavation, masonry and rubble, earth
- Battles/wars: Battle of Verdun

Garrison information
- Garrison: 314 Men (1882),52 Men (1914)

Fort Souville, briefly called Fort Lemoine, was one of the forts of the Verdun Fortification District, situated in the commune of Fleury-devant-Douaumont. Constructed between 1876 and 1879 at an altitude of 396m, it is a first generation fort. It served as a key battlefield in the 1916 Battle of Verdun during World War I. The fort was armed on its ramparts with 9 cannons and 5 mortars, with 8 pieces of artillery used as flanking fire. A Bussiere turret in attached battery was also present.

== Location ==
The fort is part of the interior belt of forts, one of two belts securing Verdun. Fort Souville was part of the first sector (Northeast of the city), serving as the first sector commander's headquarters, connected to central command via telephone.

Fort Souville is located south of Fort Douaumont and southwest of Fort Vaux.

== History ==
The fort was one of the first forts of the Séré de Rivières system, being constructed of masonry and limestone rubble covered with soil. Built 1875–1879, the fort was modified from 1888–1890, excavating underground shelters and reinforcing the powder magazine with concrete.

The planned garrison was 326 men and 32 artillery pieces. The fort's name originates not from a nearby settlement, but from the birthplace of the designer, Gustave de la Taille.

A turret for two 155mm Bussière cannons was installed from 1890–1891, 120m to the west of the fort.

By the Decree of 21 January 1887, the Minister of War Georges Boulanger renamed all forts, batteries, and barracks to those of prior military leaders. Fort Souville was thus rechristened Fort Lemoine, in reference to General Louis Lemoine. The new name was engraved on the pediment of the entrance. On 13 October 1887, Boulanger's successor, Théophile Ferron, abrogated the decree. The fort returned to its prior name while retaining the inscription at the entrance.

== July 1916 Combat ==
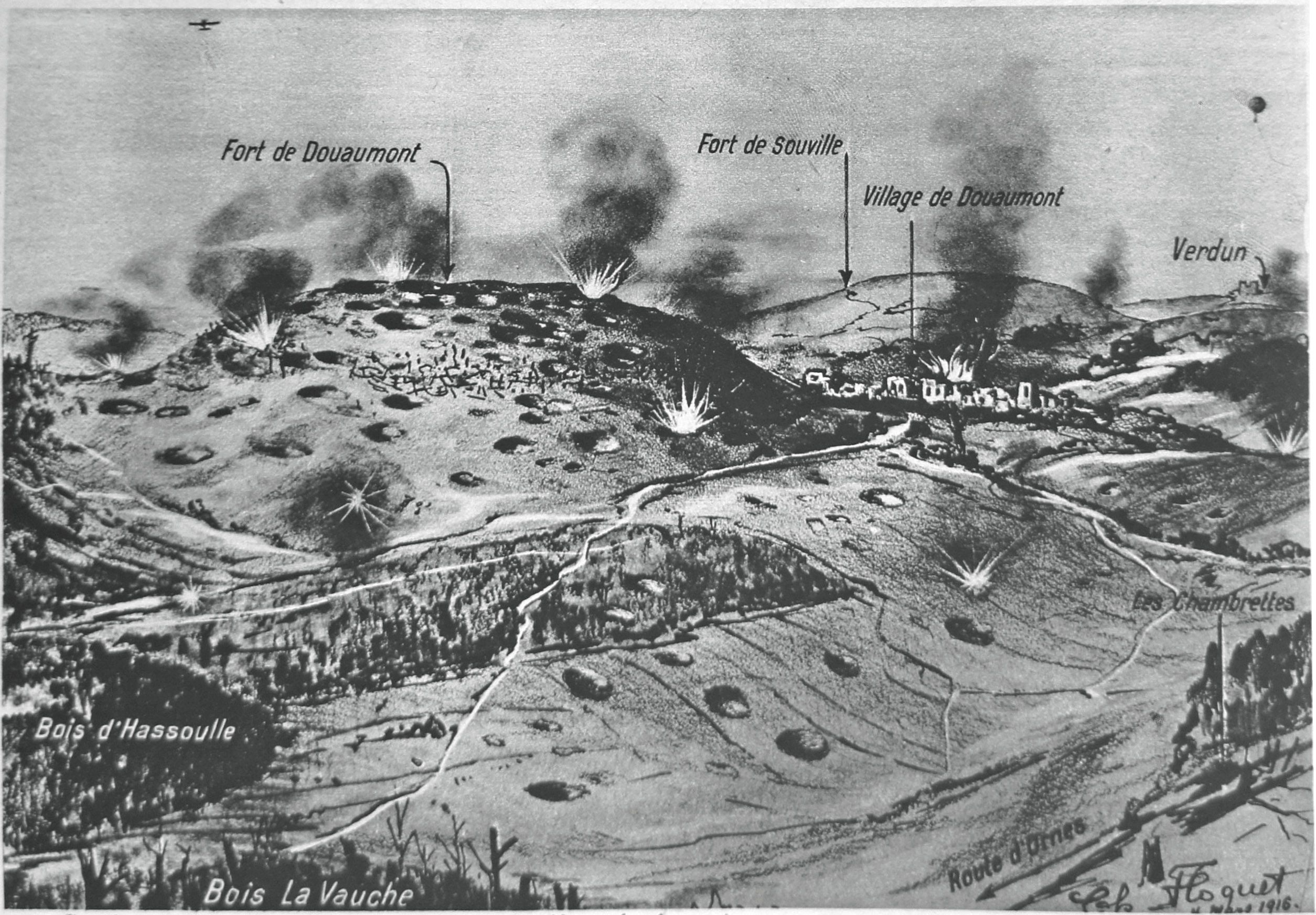
Illustration showing Verdun combat around forts Douaumont, Verdun, and Souville, Le Miroir, 1916.

On 11 July 1916, the Bavarian Guard infantry launched an assault on the village of Fleury and attempted to seize Fort Souville.

The Fleury sector was held by the French 128th Division under the command of general Riberpray. the 167th and 168th Infantry Regiment of the 255th Brigade under Colonel Coquelin de Lisle held the front line. The 167th held the foremost position, with the 168th providing support from behind.

On 9 July, the 167th Regiment was shelled by German Artillery using both explosive and gas shells.

During the night of 10 July, a captured German officer was interrogated by the 167th Regiment, revealing the planned assault for the next day.

At 5 am on 11 July, a violent bombardment began on the French lines prior to the assault by German infantry. At 5:42, the Bavarian Guards launched their assault, with flamethrowers in tow. They penetrated the French lines before the French had time to react, with ensuing hand-to-hand combat with both grenade and bayonet.

The German gas and shells interrupted all heliograph communications with Fort Souville.

At 6 o'clock, Colonel Coquelin de Lisle sent a homing pigeon with the following message: "The 255th Brigade's situation in front of Fleury is grave, with gas bombardments and the enemy's attacks, which were delayed, and morale is high but the men are exhausted. I need artillery support with 100 red fuses and 100 white fuses. The main attack appears to be between the station and the village of Fleury.

By 6:50, the Germans were approaching brigade headquarters. The order to burn confidential documents was given, with Colonel Coquelin de Lisle fighting with his rifle side by side with his men.

The 140th East Prussian Infantry Regiment aimed to seize Fort Souville, but failed to break through French lines. Meanwhile, the Bavarian attack progressed from south of Fleury to near Fort Souville. However, heavy French artillery fire inflicted severe casualties, causing the attack to stall.

However, a shell destroyed the Ménétrier battalion's machine guns, situated between the Ménétrier and Gérard battalions. German forces penetrated this gap and advanced closer to brigade headquarters, with Colonel Coquelin de Lisle killed in combat.

In the evening, the 169th and 100th Infantry Regiments moved towards "the ravine of Our Lady", which was called "the ravine of Death" by the men. The 100th regiment advanced at the head of the line, with its 2nd and 3rd battalions led the march while the 1st battalion stayed in reserve. They drove back elements of the Bavarian Guards who had crossed the railway, taking 80 prisoners. During the night, a severe German bombardment on "the ravine of Death" inflicted severe casualties on the 1st battalion, which had advanced in support of the 2nd. The majority of its soldiers were killed, as well as their leader, Commander Forlet.

On 12 July a force of around 30 German soldiers reached the fort itself but were repelled by a counterattacked led by French Lieutenant Kléber Dupuy.

=== Order of Battle ===
German:

- Bavarian Guard Infantry Regiment
  - 3 battalions
- 140th East Prussian Infantry Regiment.
  - 3 battalions

French:

- 255th Infantry Brigade (and munitions depot)
  - 167th Infantry Regiment.
    - Gérard Battalion(1st Battalion)
    - Lebrun Battalion(2nd Battalion)
    - Ménétrier Battalion(3rd Battalion)
  - 100th Infantry Regiment.
    - 2 battalions

=== Wartime Publicity ===
The war artist François Flameng illustrated the events of Fort Souville in numerous sketches and drawings in the magazine L'Illustration.

== Current State ==
After several years, Fort Souville was abandoned, having become obsolete by artillery and Verdun's location. The fort has since deteriorated, but visitors may still visit and take photos while exploring the site.
