= George Dupuis (cricketer, born 1835) =

English cricketer, schoolmaster, and clergyman

Personal information
- Full name: George Richard Dupuis
- Born: 23 March 1835; Eton, Buckinghamshire, England
- Died: 30 January 1912 (aged 76); Sessay, Yorkshire, England
- Batting: Unknown
- Bowling: Unknown
- Relatives: Harry Dupuis (uncle)

Domestic team information
- Years: Team
- 1854–1857: Cambridge University

Career statistics
Competition	First-class
Matches	8
Runs scored	161
Batting average	14.63
100s/50s	–/–
Top score	35*
Balls bowled	60
Wickets	1
Bowling average	32.00
5 wickets in innings	–
10 wickets in match	–
Best bowling	1/32
Catches/stumpings	3/–
- Source: Cricinfo, 16 June 2022

George Richard Dupuis (23 March 1835 – 30 January 1912) was an English schoolmaster and clergyman and a cricketer who played in eight first-class cricket matches, all but one for Cambridge University between 1854 and 1857. He was born at Eton, then in Buckinghamshire, and died at Sessay, Yorkshire.

The son of George John Dupuis, the vice-provost of Eton College, George Dupuis was educated there and at King's College, Cambridge. He was a middle-order batsman at Eton and played in the annual Eton v Harrow match for three seasons from 1851: it is not known whether he was right- or left-handed. At Cambridge University he went straight into the university's first team in the 1854 trial match, but he failed to make runs in that or subsequent matches across the next two seasons and could not secure his place. In 1856, he played only a single first-class game for a "Gentlemen of England" amateur side. He did not win a Blue for appearing in the University Match against Oxford University until his fourth year at the university, which was his most successful in cricket; in the 1857 game, he scored 23 and 35 not out, which was his highest first-class score, and took his only first-class wicket. His comparative inactivity as a university cricketer may be explained by an anecdote recounted by H. S. Altham; Dupuis, Altham wrote, "was refused leave by the Dean of King's to play in a University match on the score that the proper place for a scholar of King's on a Saturday afternoon was in chapel".

Dupuis won academic prizes at Cambridge and was elected a fellow of King's College in 1857, the year before he graduated with a Bachelor of Arts degree. He returned to Eton College as an assistant master where, according to an obituary, "he gave his time largely to coaching the boys at cricket". He was ordained as a deacon in the Church of England in 1859 and as a priest the following year, but he did not take up a church appointment immediately, remaining at Eton until 1875. He then took up a post as rector of Sturminster Marshall in Dorset for two years, before moving to Sessay in North Yorkshire as rector in 1877, staying there for the rest of his life; the benefice was in the gift of Hugh Dawnay, 8th Viscount Downe who had been Dupuis' pupil at Eton and who was also a cricketer. Dupuis himself played in public school-related cricket matches into his forties and attended the Eton v Harrow match at Lord's every year to 1910.
