= Dupuy =

Dupuy may refer to:

- Dupuy (surname)

== Places ==
- Dupuy, Quebec, a village in Abitibi Ouest
- Saint-Julien-du-Puy, a commune in the French département of Tarn, Midi-Pyrénées region

== See also ==
- Bache-Gabrielsen, a brand of cognac marketed as Dupuy in France
- Dupuis (surname)
