= Kléber Dupuy =

French army officer (1892–1996)

- Born: 27 June 1892; La Teste-de-Buch, Gironde, France
- Died: 16 October 1966 (aged 74); Talence, Gironde, France
- Military career
- Allegiance: France
- Branch: French Army (1913–1918); French Resistance (1940–1945)
- Service years: 1913–1918
- Rank: Captain
- Conflicts: First World War; Second World War

Kléber Dupuy (27 June 1892 – 16 October 1966) was a French army officer. The son of an oyster farmer, he was conscripted into the French Army in 1913. He served in the First World War as an enlisted soldier in the 9th Infantry Regiment but was accepted for a commission and in 1915 joined the 7th Infantry Regiment as a second lieutenant. Dupuy commanded a force of 60 men at Fort Souville during the 1916 Battle of Verdun and, on 12 July, repelled a German attack. He was honoured with the Croix de Guerre. Later in the war he was wounded in action and had part of his right leg amputated. After the war Dupuy worked for the government's veterans' office and, during the Second World War, joined the French Resistance. Dupuy was appointed a grand officier of the Legion of Honour.

== Early life ==
Dupuy was born in La Teste-de-Buch, Gironde, France, on 27 June 1892. He was the son of Louis Dupoy, an oyster farmer, and his wife Catherine. He was a teacher in his hometown. Called up for military service on 9 October 1913, he served as a 2nd class soldier in the 9th Infantry Regiment.

== First World War ==
In the lead up to the First World War Dupuy became, on 5 July 1914, a corporal. He saw action in the First Battle of the Marne in September 1914. On 24 December Dupuy was accepted as an officer cadet. He transferred to the 9th Infantry Regiment on 19 February 1915 and was appointed a second lieutenant on 30 April 1915.

=== Verdun ===
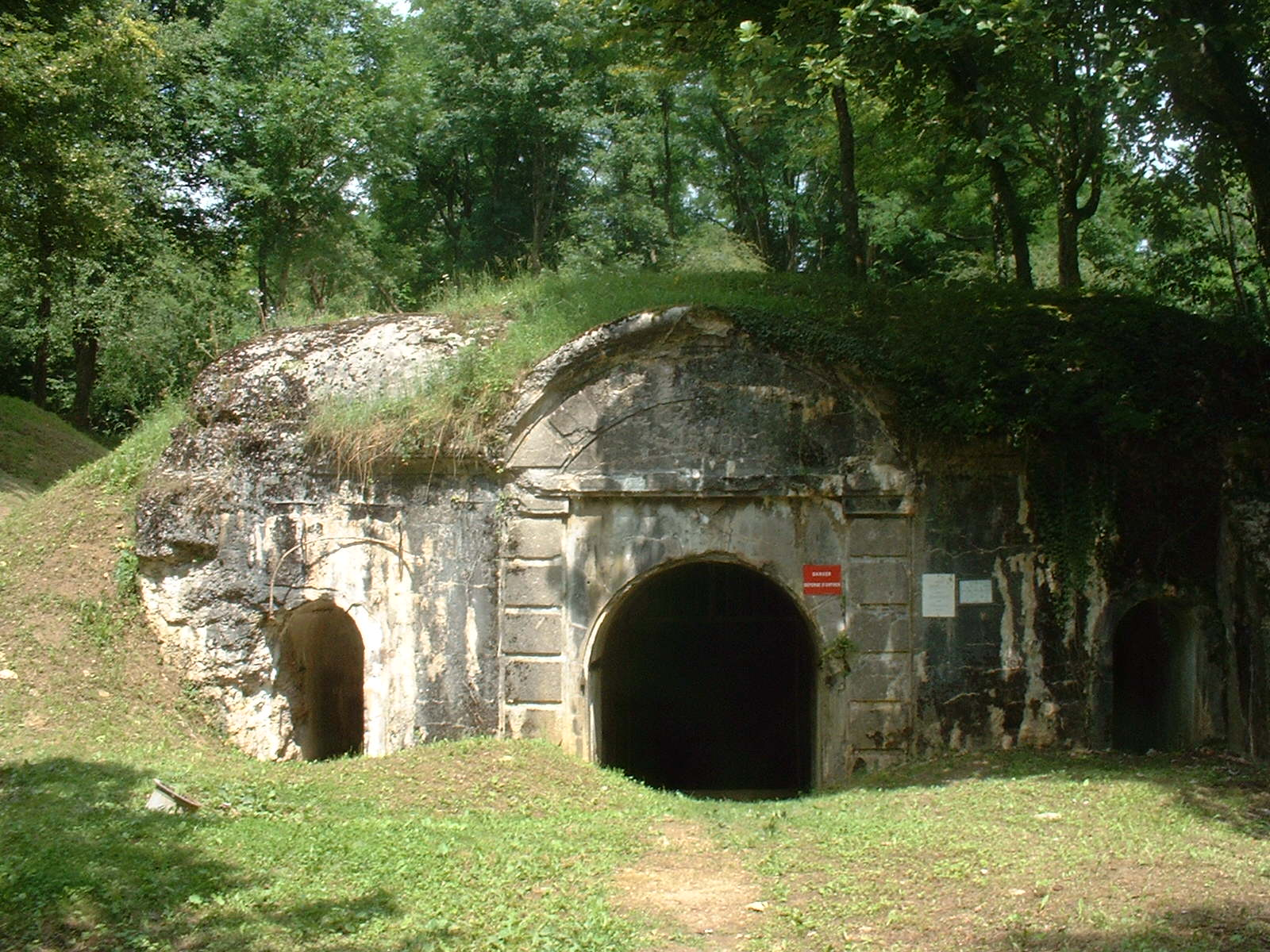
The entrance to Fort Souville

Dupuy served with his regiment in the 1916 Battle of Verdun. On 11 July a German attack with Green Cross (Diphosgene) gas shells and flamethrowers destroyed a French force protecting Fort Souville. Dupuy, who served with the regiment's 3rd Company, was posted to the fort to reinforce the 10th Company. Upon arriving at the fort on 11 July Dupuy reported to his commander "it's complete havoc here. The commander has been gassed; the garrison is hors de combat". Dupuy remained at the fort, despite orders to abandon it. Dupuy had command of around 50 men of his regiment plus around 10 territorial (reserve) soldiers.

The following morning a force of around 30 German soldiers reached the fort and raised their flag to indicate its capture. Dupuy led his men out of the fort and attacked the Germans, capturing 10 and killing or driving off the remainder. Dupuy's force held the fort for a further ten hours until relieved. French writer Henri Courtade wrote that Dupuy's actions "saved Verdun and saved the war". The French commanding general Philippe Pétain had stated that if Fort Souville was lost then he could not defend the city of Verdun. Dupuy received the Croix de guerre and, being mentioned in army orders on 14 August, a bronze palm.

=== Later war ===
Dupuy was promoted to lieutenant on 6 September 1916, though he reverted to second lieutenant on 20 November. He was appointed a chevalier of the Legion of Honour on 25 May 1917 and promoted to captain on 30 May 1918. Dupuy was wounded in action at Vigny, Moselle on 31 May 1918. Operated on at Villers-Cotterêts, the lower third of his right leg was amputated. Dupuy was appointed an officier of the Legion of Honour on 30 June 1918.

== Later life ==
Dupuy suffered for the rest of his life with the aftereffects of his wound which included atrophy of his thigh muscle, issues with his nervous system, arthritis, poor circulation, sciatica and gastric troubles. He returned to civilian life, finding employment with a government veteran's office at Bordeaux. On 25 July 1933 he was appointed a commandeur of the Legion of Honour.

Following the German occupation of France in 1940 Dupuy joined the French resistance. His service was recognised with appointment as grand officier of the Legion of Honour on 20 April 1946. Despite Pétain having led the Vichy French regime that Dupuy fought against during the war, Dupuy retained respect for his former commander. He campaigned for the rehabilitation of Pétain during the 1960s and wrote that it was his "most ardent desire is to accompany the Marshal's ashes for reburial at [Fort] Douaumont," a key battle site near Verdun. Dupuy died at Talence, Gironde, on 16 October 1966.

== Legacy ==
A monument to Dupuy's actions at Fort Souville stands nearby on the D112 road to Verdun. In 1967 a road in La Teste-de-Buch was named after Dupuy and later also one in Bordeaux. Dupuy's Verdun medal was buried with him in the La Teste-de-Buch cemetery, his others were lost in 1992 by the commune authorities. A book on Dupuy by Courtade entitled Kléber was published in 2013.

In 2014, on the 100th anniversary of the start of the First World War, a ceremony was held at Cahors, the home of the 7th Regiment, to honour Dupuy. In 2018 Dupuy was mentioned by French President Emmanuel Macron in a speech at the Arc de Triomphe marking the 100th anniversary of the end of the war. The class of officer cadets graduating from the French Army's École spéciale militaire de Saint-Cyr in 2020 chose Dupuy as the name of their class.
