= Richard Ernest Dupuy =

United States Army officer and military historian

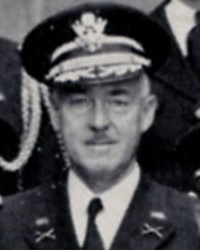
- At West Point in 1940
- Born: March 24, 1887; New York City, US
- Died: April 25, 1975 (aged 88); Walter Reed Army Medical Center, Washington, D.C., United States
- Military career
- Allegiance: United States
- Branch: United States Army
- Service years: 1909–1946
- Rank: Colonel
- Nickname: Ernie
- Conflicts: World War I; World War II
- Awards: Legion of Merit (2)

Colonel Richard Ernest Dupuy (March 24, 1887 – April 25, 1975) was a United States Army officer and military historian.

Before his National Guard artillery unit was called to serve in World War I, Dupuy was a reporter with the New York Herald. He transferred to the regular army after the war, serving in a number of public relations roles. During World War II, Dupuy served as acting director of public relations at Supreme Headquarters Allied Expeditionary Force, under General Dwight D. Eisenhower. In 1944, on D-Day, Dupuy was the first to announce on radio that the invasion of Normandy was taking place. He was also present for the signing of the German Instrument of Surrender in Berlin on May 8, 1945.

Dupuy retired from the Army after the war and became a military historian, working with his son Trevor N. Dupuy.

== Early life and World War I ==
Richard Ernest Dupuy was born on March 24, 1887, in New York City. He aspired to a career in the United States Army but his family's circumstances required him to go out to work at the age of 17. He spent three years in various clerical roles before finding employment as a junior reporter at the New York Herald. In November 1909, Dupuy joined the New York Army National Guard as a private. In April 1915, he was commissioned as a second lieutenant. By 1917, Dupuy had become the Herald's shipping news editor and a features editor. After the United States joined World War I in 1917, he was deployed to France where he served in command of an artillery battery and as a staff officer of an artillery regiment. At the end of the war, Dupuy transferred to the US Army, accepting a regular commission.

Dupuy was married to Laura Nevitt Dupuy, who was an accomplished illustrator and artist, and their son Trevor Nevitt Dupuy was born in New York City on May 3, 1919.

Dupuy graduated from the Field Artillery School Battery Officers' Course in 1924 and the Command and General Staff School in 1933. After World War I, Dupuy served in the Philippines and in a number of public relations roles including as chief of the Army Information Service in New York City; on the general staffs of II Corps and the First Army and with the United States Military Academy, where he served in public relations from 1938 to 1940.

== World War II ==
Richard Ernest Dupuy reads Communiqué Number One of the Supreme Headquarters Allied Expeditionary Force announcing the invasion of Normandy

After the outbreak of World War II, Dupuy was with the War Department's Bureau of Public Relations in Washington.

Dupuy joined the Supreme Headquarters Allied Expeditionary Force in 1943 as news chief and acting director of public relations, reporting to supreme commander Dwight D. Eisenhower. He played a key part in publicizing the Allied landings on D-Day, the first day of the invasion of Normandy, when he had the role of officially announcing the operation on radio. In a broadcast at 12:32 am Pacific Time (3:32 am Eastern War Time) on June 6, 1944, he announced that "Under the command of General Eisenhower, Allied naval forces, supported by strong air forces, began landing Allied armies this morning on the northern coast of France". This announcement, known as Communiqué Number One, was so short that Dupuy read it out twice in a row.

Dupuy remained with SHAEF for the rest of the war. He was present when the German Instrument of Surrender was signed in Berlin on May 8, 1945.

== Later career ==
After the war Dupuy returned to the War Department's Bureau of Public Relations, serving as its acting director until his retirement, as a colonel, in May 1946. His military honors include two awards of the Legion of Merit.

Dupuy was a military historian and had written a number of books in the inter-war years during his spare time. He returned to this passion in retirement and wrote 100 articles and short stories, as well as 22 published books. Dupuy often collaborated with his son, also a military historian, who had served in the US Army as a colonel and commanded an artillery battery during the Burma campaign.

Dupuy also served as an associate editor of the Army-Navy-Air Force Journal for five years and was a director and staff editor of the Historical Evaluation and Research Organization (HERO) from 1963. In March 1966, he was inducted as an honorary member of the U.S. Military Academy Class of 1913.

In their later years, Dupuy and his wife lived in Arlington, Virginia. He died on April 25, 1975, at the Walter Reed Army Medical Center, Washington, D.C. Dupuy and his wife are buried at Arlington National Cemetery.

== Publications ==
Among his books are:

- Governors Island: Its History and Development 1637–1937 (1937)
- If War Comes (1938)
- Perish by the sword: The Czechoslovakian Anabasis and our Supporting Campaigns in North Russia and Siberia 1918–1920 (1939)
- World in Arms: A Study in Military Geography (1939)
- Where They Have Trod: The West Point Tradition in American Life (1940)
- To the Colors!: The Way of Life of an Army Officer
- The Story of West Point: 1802–1943 (1943)
- Soldiers' Album (1946) with Herbert L. Bergstein
- St Vith: Lion in the Way: 106th Infantry Division in World War II (1949)
- Men of West Point: The First 150 years of the United States Military Academy (1951)
- The Compact History of the United States Army (1956)
- Military Heritage of America (1956) with Trevor Dupuy
- Brave Men and Great Captains (1959) with Trevor Dupuy
- The Compact History of the Civil War (1960) with Trevor Dupuy
- The Compact History of the Revolutionary War (1963)
- 5 Days to War, April 2–6, 1917 (1967)
- The Little Wars of the United States: A Compact History from 1798 to 1920 (1968) with William H Baumer
- World War II: A Compact History (1969)
- The National Guard: A Compact History (1971)
- An Outline History of the American Revolution (1975)
- The American Revolution, a Global War (1977)
- The Encyclopedia of Military History: From 3500 BC to the Present (1977) with Trevor Dupuy
