= Le Puy, Gironde =

Le Puy
- Commune
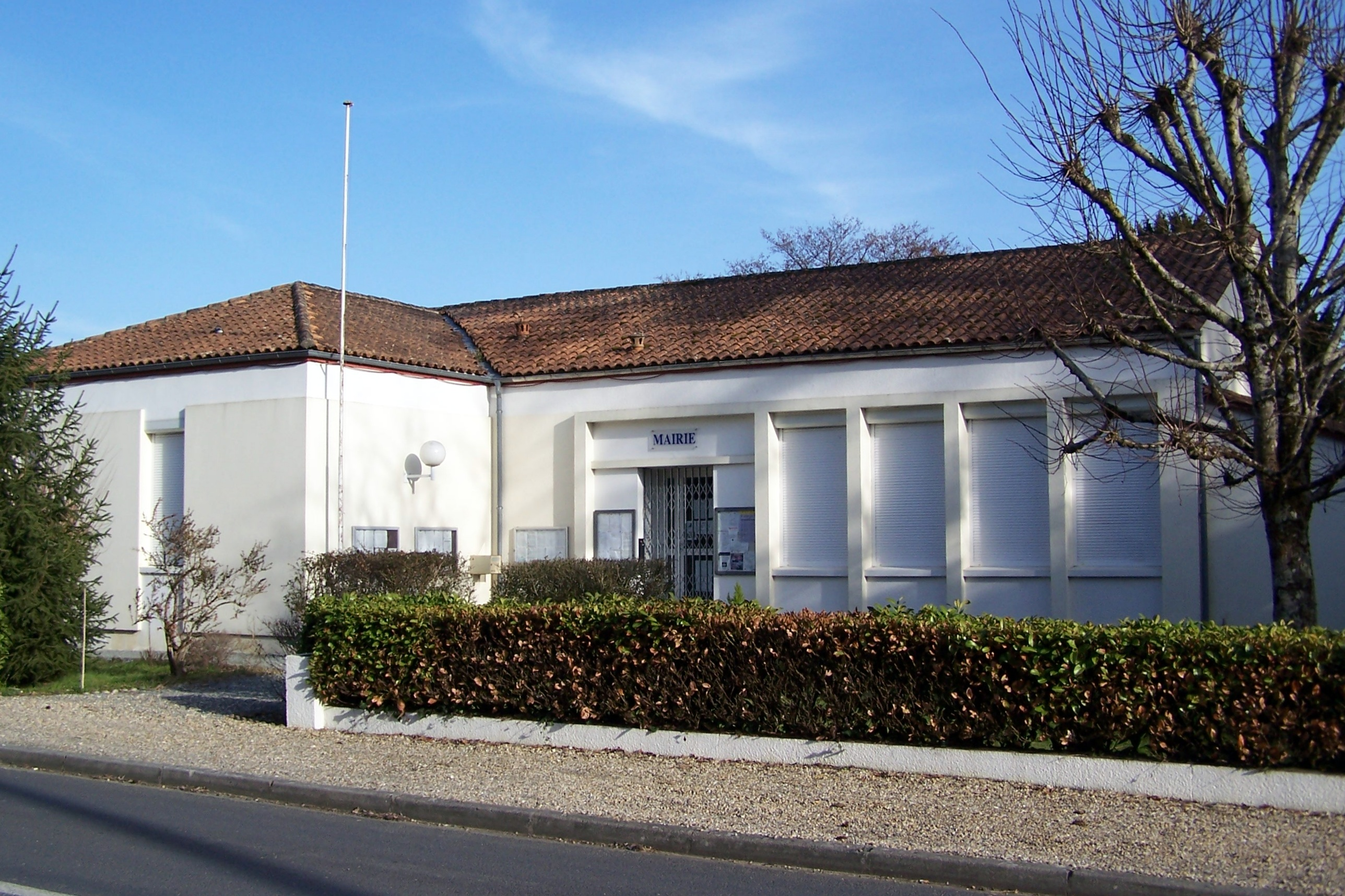
- Town hall

- Coat of arms
- Location of Le Puy
- Location within France Location within Nouvelle-Aquitaine
- Coordinates: 44°39′43″N 0°04′26″E
- Country: France
- Region: Nouvelle-Aquitaine
- Department: Gironde
- Arrondissement: Langon
- Canton: Le Réolais et Les Bastides

Government
  - Mayor (2020–2026): Joël Le Houarner
- Area^{1}: 8.15 km^{2} (3.15 sq mi)
- Elevation: 27 m (89 ft)
- Highest elevation: 115 m (377 ft)
- Lowest elevation: 18 m (59 ft)
- Population (2023): 393
  - Density: 48.2/km^{2} (125/sq mi)
- Time zone: UTC+01:00 (CET)
  - Summer (DST): UTC+02:00 (CEST)
- INSEE/Postal code: 33345 /33580
- ^{1} French Land Register data, which excludes lakes, ponds, glaciers > 1 km^{2} (0.386 sq mi or 247 acres) and river estuaries.

Le Puy (French pronunciation: [lə pɥi]; Gascon: Lo Puèi) is a commune in the Gironde department in Nouvelle-Aquitaine in southwestern France.

Le Puy lies 65 km (40 mi) from Bordeaux on the intersection of the D15 and the D16 and 1 km (0.62 mi) from Monségur across the river Dropt.

== Economy ==
The economy is agricultural, with wheat, sunflowers and soya being grown in recent years to complement the more traditional plums and tobacco.

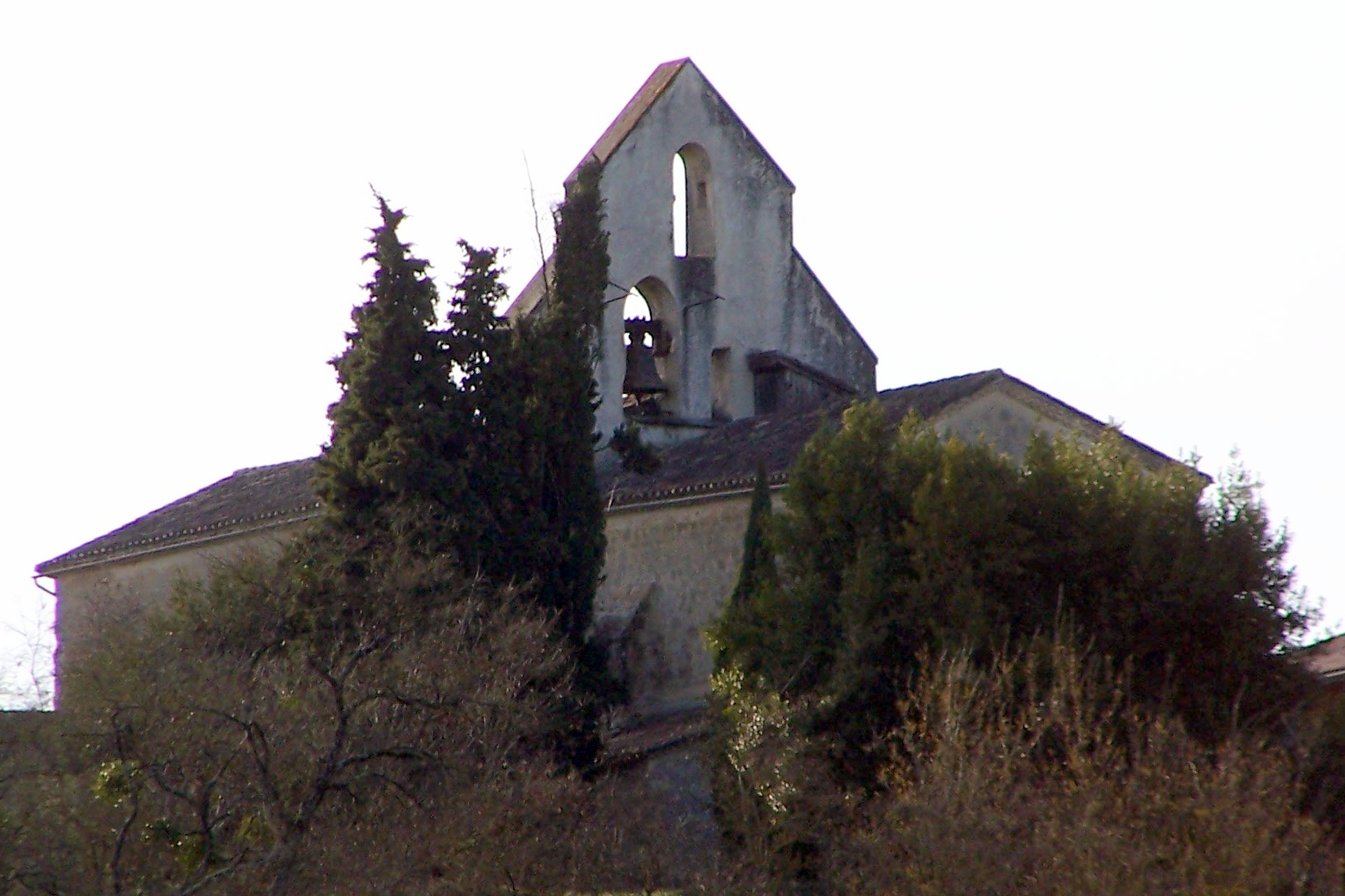
Church Sainte-Anne of Le Puy

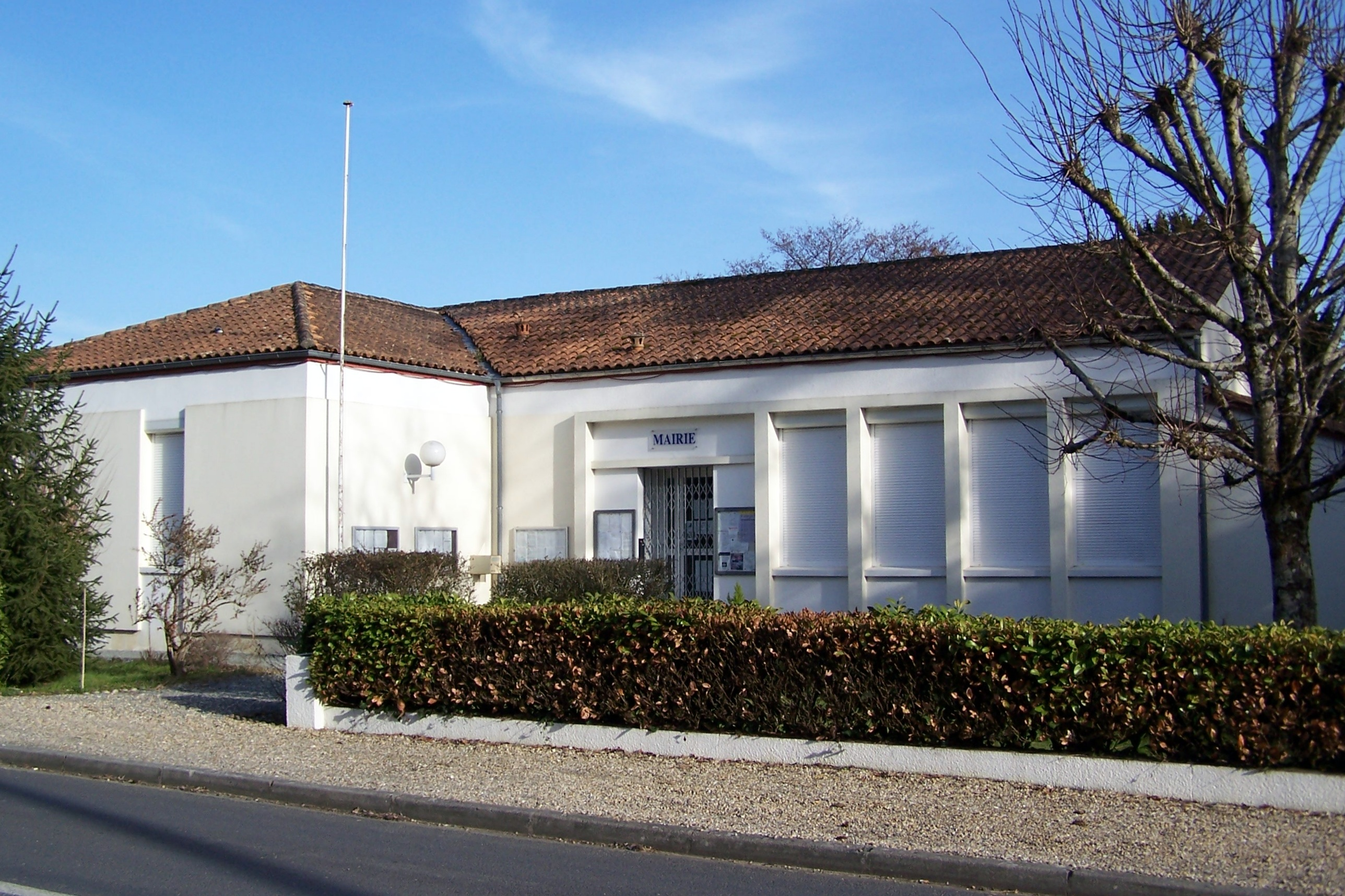
Town hall of Le Puy

The locality produces the famous Entre deux mers wine.

Mill reservoirs can provide good fishing for roach, carp and pike.

The region is well known for its cèpes (boletus mushroom).

== Geography ==
The town lies in the Dropt basin which covers nearly 1,500 km^{2} (580 sq mi) in Guyenne, from Quercy to the Bordelais. The river is an affluent of the right bank of the Gironde.

The alluvial plain of the Dropt is characterized by boulbène (a soil composed of clay and sand) terraces, rising to foothills of molasse (chalky sandstone sedimentary deposits) with a few hillocks or the edges of chalky plateaus.

== History ==
The town was a halting place on the pilgrimage to Santiago de Compostela.

The Sisters of St. Joseph were founded in Le Puy in 1650 by Jesuit Priest Jean Pierre Medaille.

The town lost 10 soldiers during World War I.

== Population ==
Historical population
| Year | Pop. | ±% p.a. |
|---|---|---|
| 1968 | 366 | — |
| 1975 | 309 | −2.39% |
| 1982 | 257 | −2.60% |
| 1990 | 281 | +1.12% |
| 1999 | 290 | +0.35% |
| 2007 | 375 | +3.27% |
| 2012 | 375 | +0.00% |
| 2017 | 403 | +1.45% |
| 2023 | 393 | −0.42% |
Source: INSEE

Its inhabitants are known as Puylots in French.

== Sights ==
- Valley of the Dropt industrial dairy 1945. Manufactures butter and milk powder;
- Archives record three windmills at Saint-Batz;
- Parish church of Saint Anne;
- Friday market in Monségur, a 13th-century bastide (walled town).

== See also ==
- Communes of the Gironde department
