= Harry Dupuis =

English cricketer

Henry Dupuis (born 24 March 1808, Wendlebury, Oxfordshire; died 3 June 1867, Richmond, Surrey) was an English cricketer with amateur status. He was associated with Cambridge University and made his debut in 1828.

Dupuis was educated at Eton College and at King's College, Cambridge, where he became a Fellow after graduation. He became an assistant master at Eton College and, having been ordained, became Church of England vicar of Richmond, Surrey from 1852 up to his death.

== Bibliography ==
- Haygarth, Arthur (1862). Scores & Biographies, Volume 2 (1827–1840). Lillywhite.
