= Trevor N. Dupuy =

American historian

Trevor Nevitt Dupuy
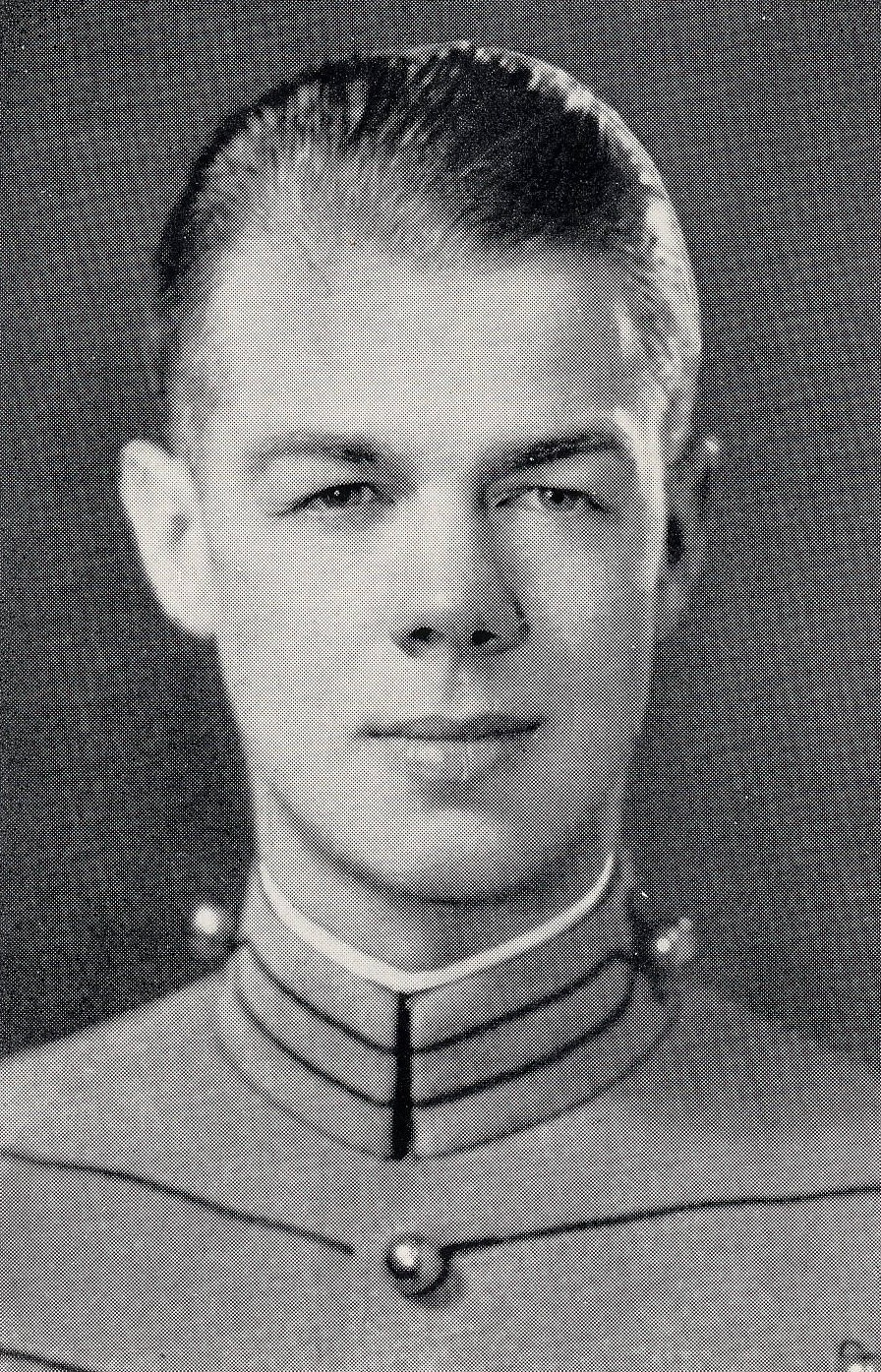
- At West Point in 1938
- Born: May 3, 1916; Staten Island, New York, US
- Died: June 5, 1995 (aged 79); Vienna, Virginia, US
- Burial place: Arlington National Cemetery
- Military career
- Allegiance: United States of America
- Branch: United States Army
- Service years: 1938–1958
- Rank: Colonel
- Conflicts: World War II • Burma Campaign
- Awards: Legion of Merit; Bronze Star; Air Medal; Order of the Cloud and Banner (China); Distinguished Service Order (UK)
- Other work: Military historian

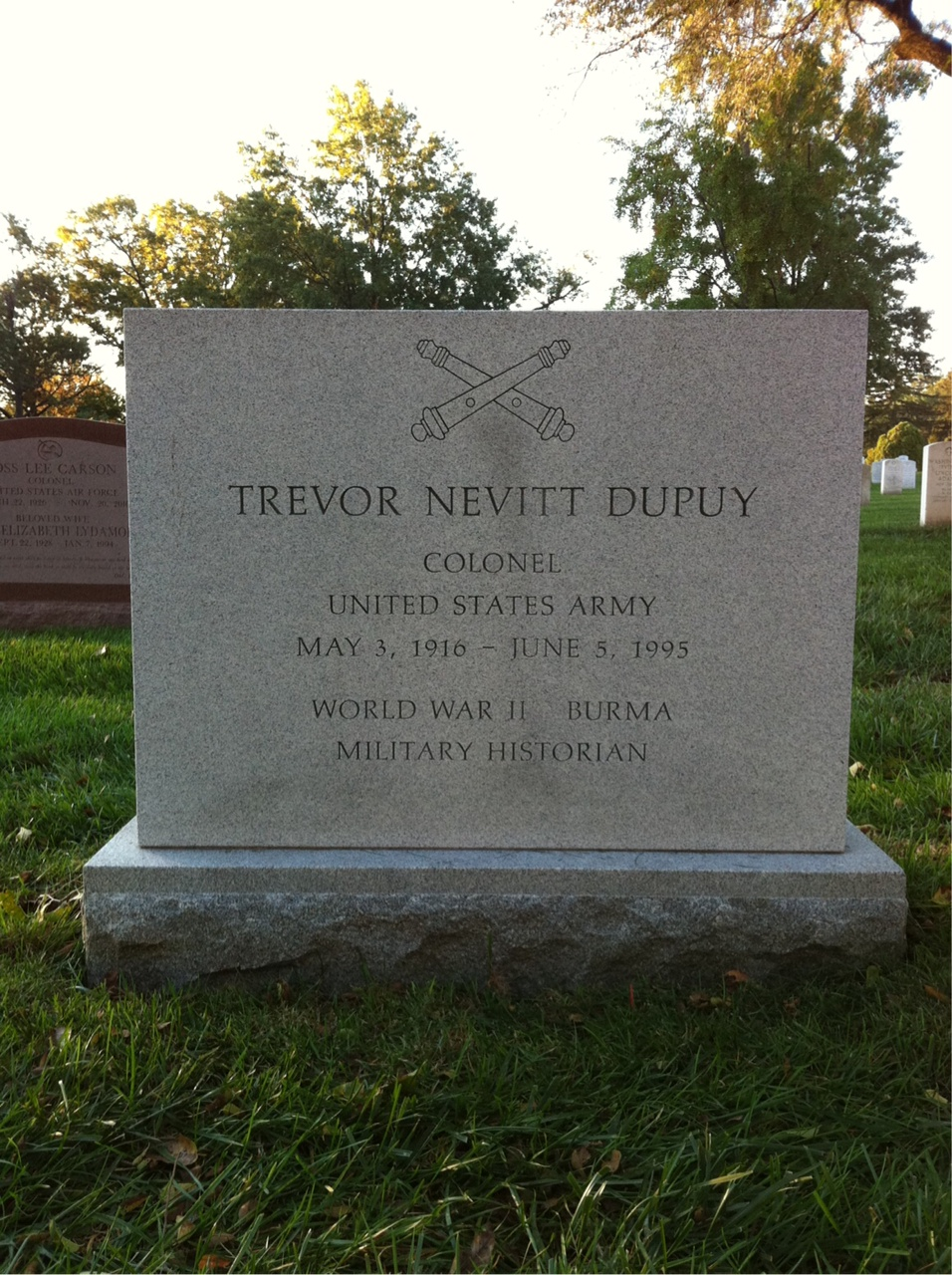
Grave at Arlington National Cemetery

Trevor Nevitt Dupuy (May 3, 1916 – June 5, 1995) was a colonel in the United States Army and a noted military historian.

== Early life ==
Born in Staten Island, New York, the son of accomplished illustrator and artist, Laura Nevitt Dupuy, and noted military historian, R. Ernest Dupuy, Trevor Dupuy followed in his father's footsteps.

== Military career ==
Dupuy attended West Point, graduating in the class of 1938. During World War II he commanded a U.S. Army artillery battalion, a Chinese artillery group, and an artillery detachment from the British 36th Infantry Division. He was always proud of the fact that he had more combat time in Burma than any other American, and received decorations for service or valour from the U.S., British, and Chinese governments. After the war Dupuy served in the United States Department of Defense Operations Division from 1945 to 1947, and as military assistant to the Under Secretary of the Army from 1947 to 1948. He graduated from the Joint Services Staff College in England in April 1949. Dupuy was a member of the original Supreme Headquarters Allied Powers Europe (SHAPE) staff in Paris under Generals Dwight D. Eisenhower and Matthew Ridgway from 1950 to 1952.

Dupuy went on to achieve eminence as a military historian and theorist. He is perhaps best known for his very large book The Encyclopedia Of Military History (co-written, like many of his books, with his father R. Ernest Dupuy). In this work Dupuy discusses the world's major and minor military conflicts from the dawn of history to the present day. Entries are arranged chronologically and by region, and most of them give little more than the names of the commanders and (often) very rough estimates for the size of the forces involved in the campaigns. Dupuy was not afraid of expressing an opinion and he classified some of his subjects as Great Captains (such as Alexander the Great, Hannibal, Julius Caesar, Gustavus Adolphus of Sweden, Viscount of Turenne, Frederick II of Prussia and Napoleon). The book mainly describes American and Western European conflicts but offers some coverage of other regions of the world.

The Encyclopedia Of Military History has been revised and updated several times, most recently in 1993. It can be found in the reference section of most American libraries.

== Academic and research career ==
Dupuy began the academic phase of his career in 1952, when Harvard University appointed him as a professor of Military Science and Tactics in the ROTC program. While there, he helped found the Harvard Defense Studies Program (directed from 1958 to 1971 by Henry Kissinger). He left Harvard in 1956 to become director of the program in military studies at Ohio State University. After retiring from active military duty in 1958, he served as a visiting professor in the International Relations Program at Rangoon University (now Yangon University) in Burma. From 1960 to 1962 Dupuy worked for the Institute for Defense Analyses, a government-funded think tank.

In 1962 he formed the first of his research companies dedicated to the study and analysis of armed conflict, the Historical Evaluation and Research Organization (HERO), and served as president and executive director until 1983. From 1967 to 1983 he was also President of T. N. Dupuy Associates Inc. (TNDA), which became the parent organization for HERO. In 1983, TNDA sold its assets (including HERO) to a new corporation he formed called Data Memory Systems, Inc. (DMSI). Trevor was the president and largest stockholder in DMSI. In 1990, Dupuy resigned from DMSI, sold his stock and reactivated TNDA. In 1992 TNDA was closed out, and he established the non-profit The Dupuy Institute (TDI).

Dupuy's main contribution to military operation analysis is the assessment method Quantified Judgment Method or QJM, where the outcome of a battle is predicted using a fairly complicated multiplicative-additive formula in which various factors relating to the strength and firepower of the fighting parties as well as the circumstances are taken into account. Dupuy and his associates adjusted the parameters of his model by using known statistical facts of several recorded battles.

The QJM is as follows:

$\Rho=S\times OE\times Q$

P = Combat power of the force

S = Force strength (number and type of weapons plus personnel)

OE = Operational environmental factors

Q = Quality of troops

In 1990, Dupuy predicted that the US would take 10,000 casualties during the Persian Gulf War, which was one of the lower professional estimates at the time.

== Family life and death ==
Dupuy killed himself by gunshot at his home in Vienna, Virginia on June 5, 1995; he had learned three weeks earlier that he had terminal pancreatic cancer. He was buried in Arlington National Cemetery. During his lifetime he wrote or co-wrote more than 50 books.

When he died, he had been married five times. He fathered nine children – six boys and three girls.

== Books and publications ==
- To the Colors: The Way of Life of an Army Officer (with R.E. Dupuy), Chicago, 1942
- Faithful and True: History of the 5th Field Artillery, Schwabisch-Hall, Germany, 1949
- Campaigns of the French Revolution and of Napoleon, Cambridge, Ma, 1956
- Brave Men and Great Captains (With R. E. Dupuy), New York, 1960, 1984, 1993
- Compact History of the Civil War (with R.E. Dupuy), New York, 1960, 1991
- Civil War Land Battles, New York, 1960
- Civil War Naval Actions, New York, 1961
- Military History Of World War II, New York, 1962–65 (in 18 fairly short books):

| Vol. 1 – European Land Battles: 1939–1943 | Vol. 2 – European Land Battles: 1944–1945 |
| Vol. 3 – Land Battles: North Africa, Sicily, And Italy | Vol. 4 – The Naval War In The West: The Raiders |
| Vol. 5 – The Naval War In The West: The Wolf Packs | Vol. 6 – The Air War In The West: September 1939 – May 1941 |
| Vol. 7 – The Air War In The West: June 1941 – April 1945 | Vol. 8 – Asiatic Land Battles: Expansion Of Japan In Asia |
| Vol. 9 – Asiatic Land Battles: Japanese Ambitions In The Pacific | Vol. 10 – Asiatic Land Battles: Allied Victories In China And Burma |
| Vol. 11 – The Naval War In The Pacific: Rising Sun Of Nippon | Vol. 12 – The Naval War In The Pacific: On To Tokyo |
| Vol. 13 – The Air War In The Pacific: Air Power Leads The Way | Vol. 14 – The Air War In The Pacific: Victory In The Air |
| Vol. 15 – European Resistance Movements | Vol. 16 – Asian And Axis Resistance Movements |
| Vol. 17 – Leaders Of World War II | Vol. 18 – Chronological Survey Of World War II |

- Compact History of the Revolutionary War (With R. E. Dupuy), New York, 1963
- Holidays, Editor, Contributor., New York, 1965
- Military Heritage Of America (With R. E. Dupuy, Paul Braim), 2 Vols., New York, 1966, 1986, 1992
- Summation: Strategic and Combat Leadership, New York, 1967
- Military History Of World War I, New York, 1967 OCLC 1173614 (in 12 fairly short books):

| Vol. 1 – 1914: The Battles In The West | Vol. 2 – 1914: The Battles In The East |
| Vol. 3 – Stalemate In The Trenches, November 1914 – March 1918 | Vol. 4 – Triumphs And Tragedies In The East: 1915–17 |
| Vol. 5 – The Campaigns On The Turkish Fronts | Vol. 6 – Campaigns In Southern Europe |
| Vol. 7 – 1918: The German Offensives | Vol. 8 – 1918: Decision In The West |
| Vol. 9 – Naval And Overseas War: 1914–15 | Vol. 10 – Naval And Overseas War: 1916– 18 |
| Vol. 11 – The War In The Air | Vol. 12 – Summary Of World War I |

- The Battle Of Austerlitz, New York, 1968
- Modern Libraries For Modern Colleges: Research Strategies For Design And Development, Washington, D.C., 1968
- Ferment In College Libraries: The Impact Of Information Technology, Washington, D.C., 1968
- Mediapower: A College Plans For An Integrated Media Service System, Washington, D.C., 1968
- Military History Of The Chinese Civil War, New York, 1969
- The Military Lives Series (published in 1969 and 1970) :

| The Military Life Of Alexander The Great | The Military Life Of Hannibal |
| The Military Life Of Julius Caesar | The Military Life Of Genghis Khan |
| The Military Life Of Gustavus Adolphus | The Military Life Of Frederick The Great |
| The Military Life Of George Washington | The Military Life Of Napoleon |
| The Military Life Of Abraham Lincoln | The Military Life Of Hindenburg And Ludendorff |
| The Military Life Of Adolph Hitler | The Military Life Of Winston Churchill |

- Revolutionary War Naval Battles (With Grace P. Hayes), New York, 1970
- Revolutionary War Land Battles (With Gay M. Hammerman), New York, 1970
- Mongolia, Foreign Area Studies Handbook, Washington, D.C., 1970
- Almanac Of World Military Power 1970 (With John A. Andrews, Grace P. Hayes), New York, 1970
- Almanac Of World Military Power 1972 (With John A. Andrews, Grace P. Hayes), New York, 1972
- Documentary History Of Arms Control And Disarmament (With Gay M. Hammerman), New York, 1974
- World Military Leaders (With Grace P. Hayes, Paul Martell), 1974
- Almanac Of World Military Power 1974 (With John A. Andrews, Grace P. Hayes), New York, 1974
- People And Events Of The American Revolution (With Gay M. Hammerman), New York, 1974
- An Outline History Of The American Revolution (With R.E. Dupuy), New York, 1975
- Encyclopedia Of Military History (With R.E. Dupuy), New York, 1975, 1986, 1993
- A Genius For War: The German Army And General Staff, 1807–1945, New Jersey, 1977, 1984, 1989, 1993
- Numbers, Predictions and War, New York, 1978, 1985
- Elusive Victory: The Arab-Israeli Wars, 1947–1974, New York, 1978, 1984, 1989, 1992
- Almanac Of World Military Power 1980 (With John A. Andrews, Grace P. Hayes), New York, 1980
- The Evolution Of Weapons And Warfare, New York, 1980, 1984, 1986
- Great Battles Of The Eastern Front (With Paul Martell), New York, 1982
- Options Of Command, New York, 1984
- Flawed Victory: The Arab-Israeli Conflict And The 1982 War In Lebanon (With Paul Martell), Virginia, 1986
- Understanding War: Military History And The Theory Of Combat, New York, 1986
- Dictionary Of Military Terms (With Curt Johnson, Grace P. Hayes), New York, 1987
- Understanding Defeat: How to Recover from Loss in Battle to Gain Victory in War, New York, 1990 ISBN 1-55778-099-4 OCLC 21118861
- Attrition: Forecasting Battle Casualties And Equipment Losses In Modern War, Virginia, 1990 ISBN 0-915979-26-8 OCLC 22965210
- If War Comes, How To Defeat Saddam Hussein, Virginia, 1991; issued as a paperback with the title How To Defeat Saddam Hussein ISBN 0-446-36263-8 OCLC 23086581
- Future Wars: The World's Most Dangerous Flashpoints, New York, 1992 ISBN 0-446-51670-8 OCLC 26301878
- Encyclopedia Of Military Biography (With Curt Johnson, David L. Bongard), New York, 1992 ISBN 0-06-270015-4 OCLC 25026255
- International Military And Defense Encyclopedia, (Brassey's) 6 Vols., Editor In Chief, New York, 1992
- Hitler's Last Gamble (With David L. Bongard, Richard C. Anderson), New York, 1994 ISBN 0-06-016627-4 OCLC 30670918

=== Unpublished manuscripts ===
- Great Captains And Modern War
- Military Myths (unfinished)
- Documentary History Of The U.S. Armed Forces (unfinished)
