= Harilyn Rousso =

American disabled rights activist (1946–2026)

- Born: May 21, 1946; New York City, U.S.
- Died: January 25, 2026 (aged 79)
- Occupations: Disabled rights activist Psychotherapist

Harilyn Rousso (May 21, 1946 – January 25, 2026) was an American disabled rights activist, psychotherapist, artist and feminist. In 2003 she was designated a Women's History Month Honoree by the National Women's History Project.

== Early life and education ==
Harilyn Rousso was born on May 21, 1946, with cerebral palsy. She decided to go into psychotherapy and was discouraged by her professors who believed that a woman with cerebral palsy could not succeed in her career, thus they refused to teach her. She would move on to another training facility and eventually obtained her license. Rousso would also graduate from Brandeis University with a degree in economics. Later on, she achieved a Master's in Social Work from New York University and a Master's in education from Boston University.

== Professional career ==
Rousso's main work focuses on three themes: psychotherapy, disabled women and fine art. After graduation from college she worked at the Office of Economic Opportunity in Washington, D.C. which helped trigger her interest in working with people. In the 1980s Rousso began the Networking Project for Disabled Women and Girls at the New York City YWCA. Later that decade she would publish Disabled, Female, and Proud: Stories of Ten Women with Disabilities and make the film Positive Images: Portraits of Women with Disabilities. As a disabled rights activist worked for the United Nations Fourth International Conference on Women and used that experience to foster Beijing +5, a series of trainings for disabled women. She has also served on the board of Ms. magazine, the Center for Women Policy Studies, the Sister Fund, among others. In 2000 she was the recipient of the Jessie Bernard Wise Women Award.

From 1997 she also produced fine art as a way to enhance visibility and awareness about disability.

== Death ==
Rousso died on January 25, 2026, at the age of 79.
