= Debbie Dupuis =

Canadian statistician

Debbie Janice Dupuis is a Canadian statistician who works in decision science and robust statistics with applications to statistical finance and environmental statistics. She is a professor in the Department of Decision Sciences at HEC Montréal.

== Education and career ==
Dupuis grew up in Memramcook, New Brunswick, and graduated from the Université de Moncton in 1989 with a bachelor's degree in mathematics and a minor in computer science. With the support of an NSERC graduate fellowship, she earned a master's degree in mathematics and statistics from Queen's University. She completed her Ph.D. in 1994 from the University of New Brunswick. Her dissertation, Knots in Spline Regression: Estimation and Inference Using Laplace Transform Techniques, was supervised by Roman Mureika, and won the Governor General's Gold Medal. She was a faculty member at Dalhousie University and Western University before moving to HEC Montréal.

== Recognition ==
In 2012 the Université de Moncton gave Dupuis their Le Prisme award as a distinguished alumna in the sciences. In 2017 Dupuis was elected as a Fellow of the American Statistical Association "for outstanding contributions to the analysis of extreme values and the development of robust statistical methods; for designing and promoting the use of innovative statistical analysis techniques in a broad array of substantive fields, most notably the environmental sciences, finance and hydrology; and for dynamic and sustained involvement in editorial and organizational service to the profession".
