= Duarte de Puy =

Portuguese nobleman and diplomat

- Lord
- Born: 12th Century; Coimbra, Portugal
- Died: 12th Century; Kingdom of France
- Noble family: PUY
- Father: Godefroy de Puy
- Mother: Elvira Viegas
- Occupation: Diplomat

Duarte de Puy (c. 1125–11?) was a Portuguese nobleman and ambassador of Pope Clement II in Rome. He served the King Sancho I in the war against the Moors.

Duarte was born in Coimbra, Kingdom of Portugal, son of Godofredo de Puy, a knight from Normandy, France. His wife was Genebra de Sousa, daughter of Álvaro de Sousa, Lord of Moncorvo .
