= Jean Dupuy =

Jean Dupuy may refer to:

- Jean Dupuy (artist) (1925–2021), French artist
- Jean Dupuy (politician) (1844–1919), French politician and media baron
- Jean Dupuy (rugby union) (1934–2010), French rugby player
- Jean Dupuy (French Resistance) (1911–1944)
