= Charles Cooke (cricketer) =

English cricketer and clergyman

Personal information
- Full name: Charles Russell Cooke
- Born: 28 February 1836; Chelsworth, Suffolk, England
- Died: 20 February 1892 (aged 55); Semer, Suffolk, England
- Batting: Unknown

Domestic team information
- Years: Team
- 1858: Cambridge University
- 1858: Cambridgeshire

Career statistics
Competition	First-class
Matches	5
Runs scored	61
Batting average	6.77
100s/50s	–/–
Top score	23
Catches/stumpings	4/–
- Source: Cricinfo, 23 April 2021

Charles Russell Cooke (28 February 1836 – 20 February 1892) was an English first-class cricketer and clergyman.

The son of the Reverend James Young Cooke, he was born in February 1836 at Chelsworth, Suffolk. He was educated at both Ipswich School and Eton College, before going up to Clare College, Cambridge. While studying at Cambridge, he played first-class cricket for Cambridge University Cricket Club in 1858, making four appearances including in The University Match against Oxford at Lord's, gaining him his cricket blue. He also played for Cambridgeshire in the same year against Surrey at The Oval. He scored 61 runs in his five first-class matches, with a highest score of 23.

After graduating from Cambridge, he took holy orders in the Anglican Church in 1859. His first ecclesiastical post was as a priest at Ely Cathedral in 1860. Later in 1860, he became curate at Great Bradley, a post he held until 1864 when he became vicar at Haveringland. He was vicar there until 1875, when he succeeded his father as rector of Semer. Cooke died suddenly at Semer in February 1892.
