= Capel Lofft Holden =

English engineer

Brigadier-General Sir Capel Lofft Holden KCB FRS
- Portrait by Walter Stoneman, 1917
- Born: Henry Capel Lofft Holden; 23 January 1856; Cheltenham, England
- Died: 30 March 1937 (aged 81); Greenwich, London, England
- Resting place: Highgate Cemetery
- Known for: Designing Brooklands motor racing circuit; Chairman of The Royal Automobile Club and other organisations

Brigadier-General Sir Henry Capel Lofft Holden KCB FRS (23 January 1856 – 30 March 1937) was a British Army officer and engineer, the designer of Brooklands motor racing circuit, chairman of The Royal Automobile Club and other organisations.

== Biography ==
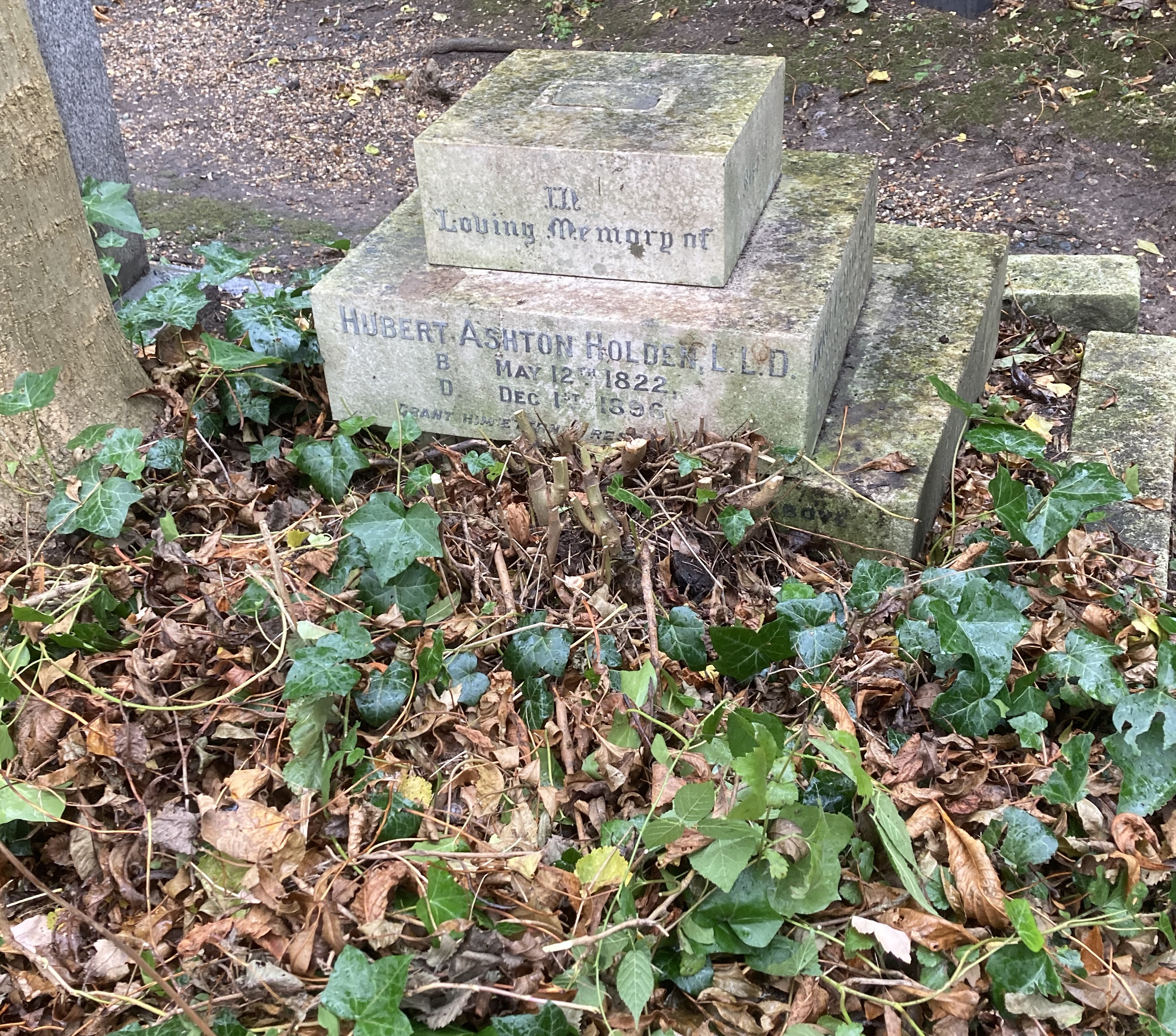
Family grave of Henry Capel Lofft Holden in Highgate Cemetery

He was born in Cheltenham, the eldest son of the classical scholar Hubert Ashton Holden, and his wife, Letitia Lofft. He was educated at the Queen Elizabeth's School, Ipswich and the Royal Military Academy, Woolwich. He joined the Royal Artillery in 1875 and saw service in India.

From 1881, he served in the technical branches of the Army in connection with the development of artillery and the manufacture of ordnance. He was made captain inspector at Woolwich Arsenal in 1885 and Inspector of Stores in 1888. Promoted Major in 1892 he was appointed Superintendent of the Woolwich Royal Gun Factory in 1899 and also of the Royal Carriage Factory in 1907. He held both positions until his retirement from the Army as a colonel in 1912.

During his working life he was credited with the design and development of numerous artillery related electrical instruments such as the chronograph for measuring projectile speeds. He served on the board of the National Physical Laboratory from 1907 to 1911.

In 1895, designed an engine he fitted to a bicycle and designed the first four-cylinder motorcycle between 1899 and 1902.

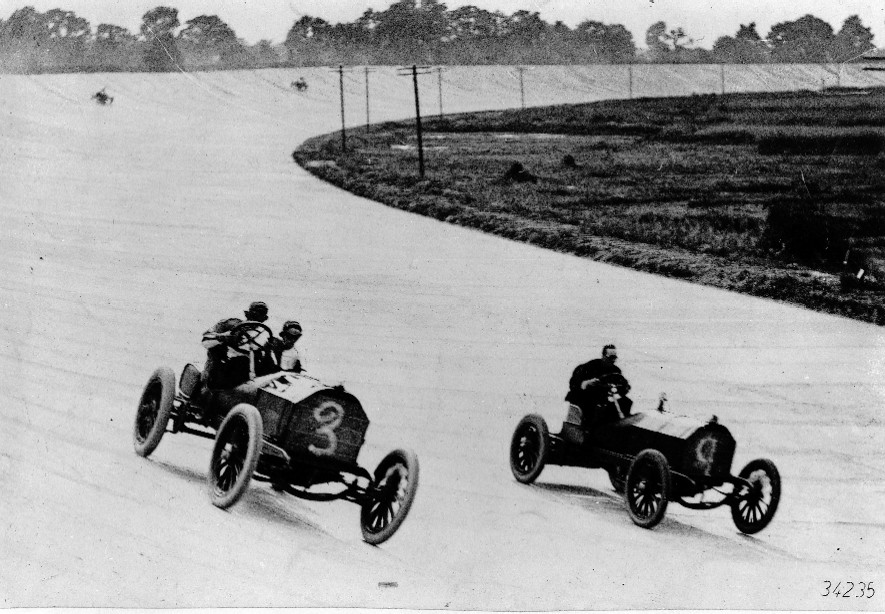
Brooklands car racing circuit, 1907

In 1906 he designed the Brooklands motor racing circuit in Weybridge, Surrey.

He was a director of BSA, who manufactured motorcycles amongst other things and in 1921 became chairman of the Royal Aero Club.

He had married Elizabeth (Bessie) in London in 1889, the daughter of R. Farrant.

He lived in retirement in Malvern and died in Greenwich, London, in 1937. His ashes were buried in the Holden family grave (plot no.32161) on the eastern side of Highgate Cemetery.

== Honours and awards ==
- 1895: Elected Fellow of the Royal Society
- 1902: Lefroy Gold Medal
- 1904: Chairman of Royal Automobile Club
- 1911 Coronation Honours: Companion of the Order of the Bath (CB)
- 1913: Vice-president of IEE
- 1914: Elected President of IEE but too busy to accept the post
- 1916 New Year Honours: Knight Commander of the Order of the Bath (KCB)
