= Listed buildings in Semer, Suffolk =

Civil Parish in Suffolk, England

Semer is a village and civil parish in the Babergh District of Suffolk, England. It contains 13 grade II listed buildings that are recorded in the National Heritage List for England.

This list is based on the information retrieved online from Historic England.

== Key ==
Grade	Criteria
I	Buildings that are of exceptional interest
II*	Particularly important buildings of more than special interest
II	Buildings that are of special interest

== Listing ==
Name	Grade	Location	Type	Completed (Note: The date given is the date used by Historic England as significant for the initial building or that of an important part in the structure's description.)	Date designated	Grid ref. (Note: The grid reference is based on the British national grid reference system, sometimes known as OSGB36, used by the Ordnance Survey.) Geo-coordinates	Notes	Entry number (Note: The "List Entry Number" is a unique number assigned to each listed building and scheduled monument by Historic England.)	Image	Wikidata
Dove House	II	IP7 6QZ			23 January 1958	TM0104346526; 52°04′50″N 0°55′57″E		1037061	Upload Photo	Q26288756
Ash Street Farmhouse	II	Ash Street			10 July 1980	TM0109346689; 52°04′55″N 0°56′00″E		1351613	Upload Photo	Q26634699
Barn and Outbuildings to the West of Dairy Farmhouse	II	Ash Street			10 July 1980	TM0062846633; 52°04′54″N 0°55′36″E		1037022	Upload Photo	Q26288709
Bridge Over River Brett	II	Ash Street			24 April 1990	TM0102146412; 52°04′46″N 0°55′56″E		1351633	Upload Photo	Q26634717
Corner Cottage	II	Ash Street			10 July 1980	TM0103346588; 52°04′52″N 0°55′57″E		1037020	Upload Photo	Q26288705
Dairy Farmhouse	II	Ash Street			10 July 1980	TM0068546613; 52°04′53″N 0°55′39″E		1037021	Upload Photo	Q26288707
Old Tiles	II	Ash Street			10 July 1980	TM0127747021; 52°05′06″N 0°56′11″E		1351575	Upload Photo	Q26634664
Spring Cottage	II	Ash Street			10 July 1980	TM0106246584; 52°04′52″N 0°55′58″E		1351556	Upload Photo	Q26634646
Church of All Saints	II	Church Lane	church building		10 July 1980	TL9989746789; 52°05′00″N 0°54′58″E		1351576	Church of All Saints More images	Q26634665
Semer Manor	II	Church Lane			10 July 1980	TL9969246929; 52°05′05″N 0°54′47″E		1037023	Upload Photo	Q26288711
Semer War Memorial	II	Church Lane, IP7 6JB	war memorial		4 November 2020	TL9992546787; 52°05′00″N 0°54′59″E		1470258	Semer War Memorial More images	Q101411534
Roper's Green	II	Roper's Green			10 July 1980	TL9899945534; 52°04′21″N 0°54′08″E		1351577	Upload Photo	Q26634666
Tudor Cottages	II	Watson's Hill, Watsons Hill			23 April 1970	TL9957346304; 52°04′45″N 0°54′40″E		1037024	Upload Photo	Q26288713

== See also ==
- Grade I listed buildings in Suffolk
- Grade II* listed buildings in Suffolk

== Sources ==
- Bettely, James; Pevsner, Nikolaus (2015) [1961], Suffolk: West, The Buildings of England, New Haven and London: Yale University Press, ISBN 978-0-300-19655-9
