= Geoffrey Rees-Jones =

- Full name: Geoffrey Rippon Rees-Jones
- Born: 8 July 1914 Ipswich, Suffolk, England
- Died: 13 September 2004 (aged 90) Strang, Isle of Man
- School: Ipswich School
- University: University College, Oxford
- Occupation: Schoolmaster

Rugby union career
- Position: Wing
International career
Years	Team	Apps	(Points)
1934–36	Wales	5	(6)

Geoffrey Rippon Rees-Jones (8 July 1914 — 13 September 2004) was a Welsh international rugby union player.

Rees-Jones was born to Welsh parents in Ipswich. He was educated at Ipswich School and set a long-standing school record for the 440 yards. A three-time blue, Rees-Jones read mathematics and physics at University College, Oxford.

Between 1934 and 1936, Rees-Jones gained five Wales caps as a wing three-quarter and is most noted for his contribution to a win over the All Blacks at Cardiff in 1935. After trailing at half-time, Rees-Jones set up a try to Claude Davey with a cross-kick, then scored two tries himself, the last with two minutes remaining to secure a 13–12 victory.

Rees-Jones, brigade major, got mentioned in dispatches serving with the Commandos during World War II and was part of a force which captured Diego-Suarez from the Vichy French on Madagascar.

A teacher by profession, Rees-Jones was headmaster of Bembridge School from 1954 to 1958, after which he served as principal of King William's College on the Isle of Man until 1979, when he retired.

== See also ==
- List of Wales national rugby union players
