= Russell Heap =

English cricketer

Personal information
- Full name: Russell Heap
- Born: 6 December 1968 (age 57); Leeds, Yorkshire, England
- Batting: Right-handed

Domestic team information
- Years: Team
- 1988–1990: Cambridge University
- 1988–1989: Suffolk

Career statistics
Competition	First-class
Matches	20
Runs scored	669
Batting average	20.90
100s/50s	–/2
Top score	63
Catches/stumpings	11/–
- Source: Cricinfo, 13 July 2019

Russell Heap (born 6 December 1968) is an English former first-class cricketer.

Heap was born at Leeds and was educated at Ipswich School, before going up to Magdalene College, Cambridge. While studying at Cambridge, he made his debut in first-class cricket for Cambridge University against Essex at Fenner's in 1988. He played first-class cricket for Cambridge until 1990, making a further nineteen appearances. He scored 669 runs in his twenty matches, at an average of 20.90.

Heap made his highest first-class score of 63 in the first innings of Cambridge's victory over Sussex in 1990, and in the second innings he hit a six to win the match. It was Cambridge's first victory over a county side for eight years. In addition to playing first-class cricket, Heap also played minor counties cricket for Suffolk in 1988 and 1989, making four appearances in the Minor Counties Championship.
