= Hubert Ashton Holden =

English classical scholar (1822–1896)

Hubert Ashton Holden (12 May 1822 – 1 December 1896) was an English classical scholar.

== Biography ==
He was born in Birmingham into an old Staffordshire family. He was educated at King Edward's College, Birmingham, under Francis Jeune (afterwards bishop of Peterborough), and subsequently under James Prince Lee (afterwards bishop of Manchester). He proceeded to Trinity College, Cambridge, and in his first year of residence, 1842, gained the first Bell university scholarship. He graduated B.A. in 1845, being senior classic, and junior optime in the mathematical tripos, and was fellow of Trinity College from 1847 to 1854; he was LL.D. in 1863.

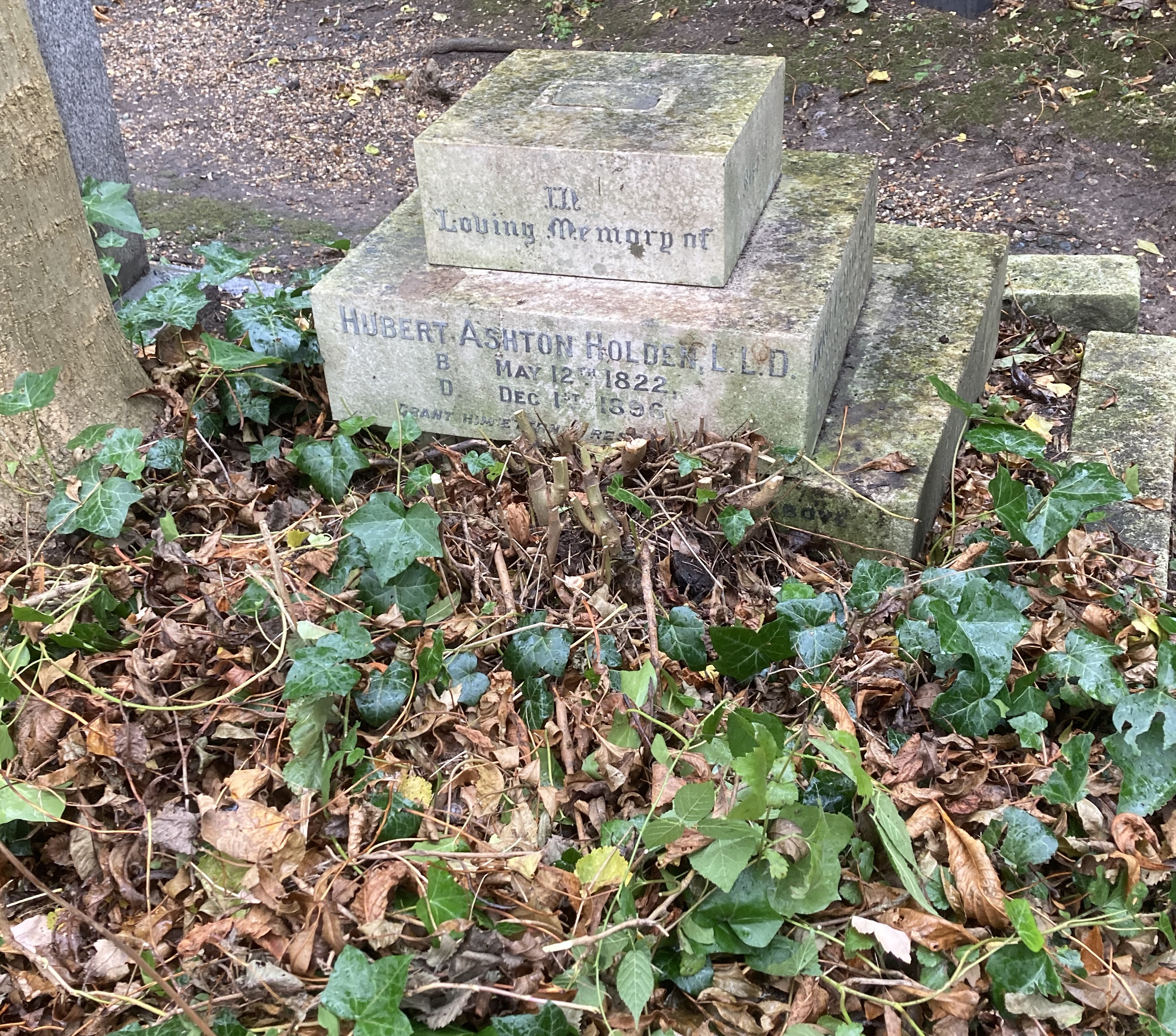
Family grave of Hubert Ashton Holden in Highgate Cemetery

In 1848, he was ordained deacon, and took priest's orders in 1859. He discharged the duties of assistant tutor and classical lecturer of his college from 1848 until 1853, when he was appointed vice-principal of Cheltenham College, and continued in that post until 1858. From 1858 to 1883, he was headmaster of Queen Elizabeth's School, Ipswich. In 1890, he was appointed by the crown to a fellowship of the university of London, in which he had been classical examiner from 1869 till 1874, and examiner in Greek from 1886 till 1890. In 1892 the degree of Litt.D. was conferred on him by Dublin University. He died on 1 Dec. 1896, at 20 Redcliffe Square, London, in his seventy-fifth year, and was buried on 5 December in the eastern side of Highgate Cemetery.

In addition to several school editions of portions of Cicero, Thucydides, Xenophon and Plutarch, he published an expurgated text of Aristophanes with a useful onomasticon (re-issued separately, 1902) and larger editions of Cicero's De officiis (revised ed., 1898) and of the Octavius of Minucius Felix (1853).

He married Letitia Lofft and was the father of Brig.-Gen. Sir Capel Lofft Holden.

== Works ==
Those by which he was best known are 'Foliorum Silvula : Selections for Translation into Latin and Greek Verse, chiefly from the University and College Examination Papers,' Cambridge, 1852 (four parts : pt. i. 2nd ed. 1888; pt. ii. 4th ed. 1890; pt. iii. 3rd ed. 1864); 'Foliorum Centuriæ,' 1852 (10th ed. 1888), a similar collection of pieces for translation into Latin and Greek prose, and 'Folia Silvulæ, sive Eclogæ Poetarum Anglicorum in Latinum et Græcum conversæ' (Cambridge, vol. i. 1865; vol. ii. 1870), containing select translations, by various hands, of pieces from the preceding volumes. All these were edited for the syndics of the Cambridge University Press.

For the same body he edited Cicero's 'De Officiis' (1869; 6th ed. 1886; revised edition, 1898), and 'Pro Gnteo Plancio Oratio ad Judices' (1881); Xenophon's 'Cyropædeia' (3 vols. 1887–90); Plutarch's ' Lives of the Gracchi' (1885), 'Lucius Cornelius Sulla' (1885), 'Nicias' (1887), 'Timoleon' (1889), and 'Demosthenes' (1893); the 'Octavius' of Minucius Felix : the text newly revised from the original manuscript (1853); 'Thucydides, book vii.' (1891); the comedies of Aristophanes' (1848). He published, in collaboration with Richard Dacre Archer Hind, 'Sabrinæ Corolla in Hortulis Regiæ Scholæ Salopiensis continuerunt tres Viri Floribus Legendis' (1850; 4th ed. 1890), a collection of poetical extracts with translations into Latin or Greek. Holden edited also the following works for Macmillan's 'Classical Series:' Plutarch's 'Lives' of Pericles (1894) and Themistocles (1881; 3rd ed. enlarged, 1892); Xenophon's 'Hieron' (1883; 3rd ed. 1888) and 'Œconomicus' (1884; 4th ed. 1889); and Cicero's 'Pro Public Sestio' (1883; 3rd ed. 1889).
