= Holden motor bicycle =

Holden Motor Bicycle
- Manufacturer: Motor Traction Company
- Production: 1899–1902
- Assembly: Coventry, England
- Class: Motorized bicycle
- Engine: Water-cooled flat-four
- Top speed: 25 miles per hour (40 km/h)

The Holden motor bicycle was a motorized bicycle produced in Coventry, England, from 1899 to 1902. It was the first motorized bicycle to be manufactured in Britain and featured a 1054 cc, water-cooled flat-four engine. Designed and patented by Henry Capel Lofft Holden in 1896, the engine allowed the bicycle to reach a top speed of approximately 25 miles per hour (40 km/h).
