= Richard Mann (cricketer) =

English cricketer (born 1982)

Personal information
- Full name: Richard James Mann
- Born: 26 September 1982 (age 44); Ipswich, Suffolk, England
- Batting: Left-handed
- Bowling: Right-arm off break

Domestic team information
- Years: Team
- 2003–2005: Cambridge University
- 2003: Cambridge UCCE

Career statistics
Competition	First-class
Matches	5
Runs scored	216
Batting average	24.00
100s/50s	–/2
Top score	63
Catches/stumpings	5/–
- Source: Cricinfo, 3 September 2020

Richard James Mann (born 26 September 1982) is an English former first-class cricketer.

Mann was born at Ipswich in September 1982. He was educated at Ipswich School, before going up to St John's College, Cambridge. While studying at Cambridge, he made three first-class appearances for Cambridge University against Oxford University in The University Matches of 2003, 2004 and 2005. He scored 150 runs in these matches, making two half centuries with a high score of 63. In addition to playing first-class cricket for Cambridge University, Mann also made two appearances in 2003 for Cambridge UCCE against Essex and Kent. (Note: Cambridge UCCE differed from Cambridge University Cricket Club in that it was open to students at Anglia Ruskin University, whereas Cambridge University Cricket Club is exclusively for students of the constituent colleges of the University of Cambridge.)
