= Crelin Bodie =

British flying ace of WWII

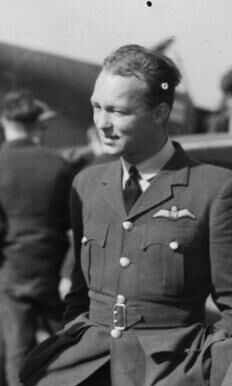
- Born: April 1920; Kirton, Suffolk, United Kingdom
- Died: 24 February 1942 (aged 21); Eglinton, County Londonderry, Northern Ireland
- Burial place: St. Canice, Eglinton, County Londonderry, Northern Ireland
- Military career
- Allegiance: United Kingdom
- Branch: Royal Air Force
- Service years: 1939–1942
- Rank: Flight Lieutenant
- Units: No. 66 Squadron; No. 310 Squadron; No. 152 Squadron
- Conflicts: Second World War: Battle of Britain; Circus offensive
- Awards: Distinguished Flying Cross

Crelin Bodie, DFC (April 1920 – 24 February 1942) was a British flying ace who served with the Royal Air Force (RAF) during the Second World War. He was credited with having shot down at least ten aircraft.

Born in Kirton, Bodie joined the RAF in 1939 and after completing his flying training was posted to No. 66 Squadron in May the following year. He flew Supermarine Spitfire fighters extensively during the squadron's operations in the Battle of Britain, achieving several aerial victories. He was awarded the Distinguished Flying Cross towards the end of 1940. He subsequently flew with No. 310 Squadron and then No. 152 Squadron. He was killed in a flying accident at Eglinton in Northern Ireland on 24 February 1942, aged 21.

== Early life ==
Crelin Arthur Walford, the son of Henry and Elsie Bodie, was born in April 1920 at Kirton in the county of Suffolk in the United Kingdom. He went to school at St. Matthew's School, before proceeding to Ipswich School. Once his education was completed, he worked in London at commercial premises.

== Second World War ==
A few weeks after the outbreak of the Second World War, Bodie joined the Royal Air Force (RAF) on a short service commission; he had applied shortly before the outbreak of hostilities. His commission, as an acting pilot officer, was granted with effect from 23 October 1939. In May 1940, once his flight training was completed, he was posted to No. 66 Squadron. At the time Bodie joined the unit, it was based at Duxford and, equipped with Supermarine Spitfire fighters, was involved in providing aerial cover for the British Expeditionary Force as it was evacuated from the beaches at Dunkirk.

=== Battle of Britain ===
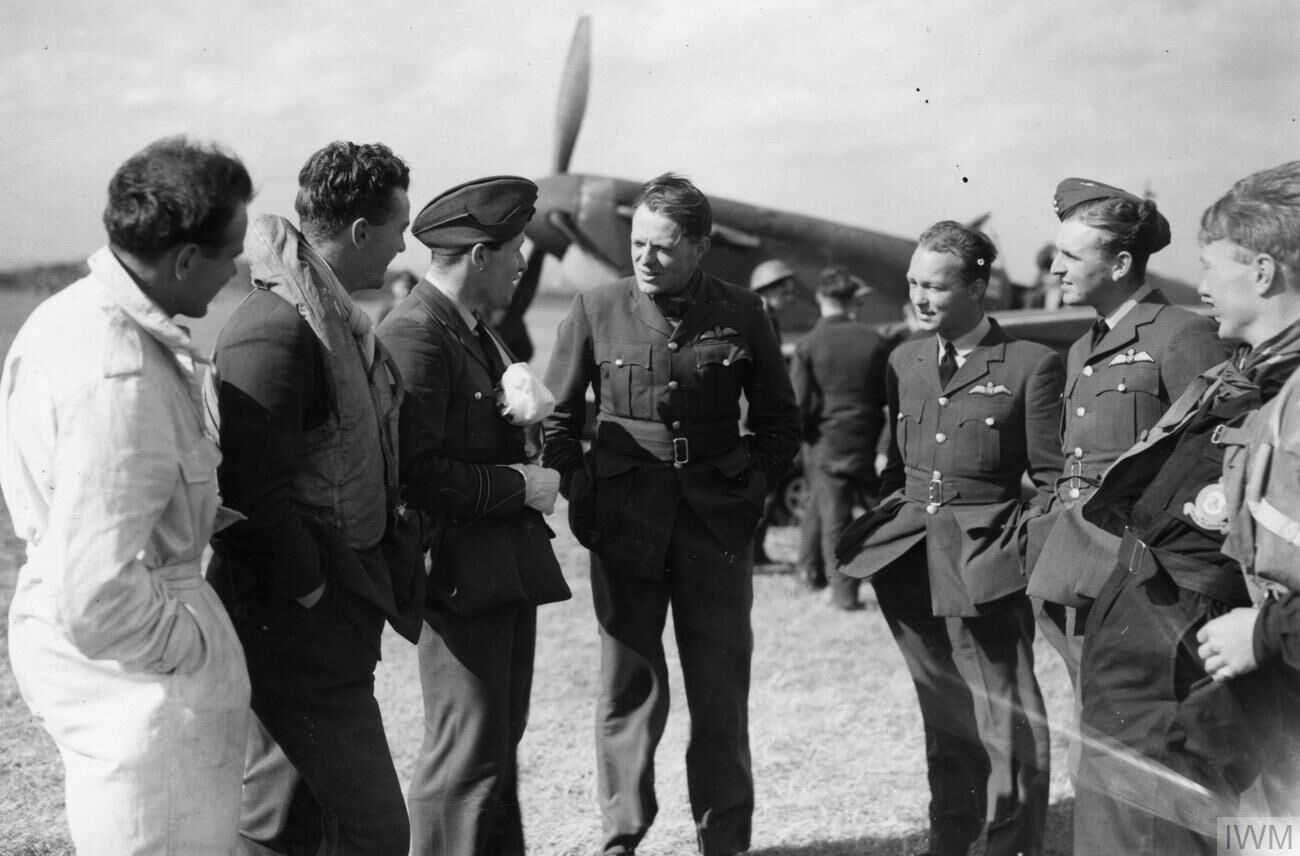
A group of No. 66 Squadron pilots at Gravesend, September 1940; Bodie stands third right

After its operations over Dunkirk, No. 66 Squadron reverted to patrolling over the North Sea from Coltishall and being scrambled to intercept incoming raids. It soon began to be drawn into the aerial fighting during the Battle of Britain. On 8 July Bodie claimed to have destroyed a Heinkel He 111 medium bomber although this was unconfirmed. He shared in the probable destruction of a He 111 about 20 miles (32 km) south of Lowestoft on 19 August. Flying closer to Lowestoft the following day, he and five other pilots combined to shoot down a Messerschmitt Bf 110 heavy fighter. A share in a second Bf 110 that was probably destroyed the same day was also credited to Bodie. On the last day of the month, he shared in the destruction of a Dornier Do 17 medium bomber to the southwest of Cromer. On 2 September, 70 miles (110 km) east of Aldeburgh, he and two other pilots shot down a He 111. Two days later, he probably destroyed a Messerschmitt Bf 109 fighter in the vicinity of Maidstone. He damaged two Bf 109s the next day, also near Maidstone. On 7 September his Spitfire was damaged in an engagement with the Luftwaffe, and he had to crash land the aircraft. By this time, the squadron was operating from Kenley and later in the month would move to Gravesend.

Bodie shot down a He 111 over the Romney Marsh on 11 September and this was followed four days later, on what is now known as Battle of Britain Day, the destruction of four Do 17s near Gravesend and Dungeness respectively; two of these were shared with other RAF fighter pilots. His aircraft was damaged during one of the interceptions carried out that day. On 18 September he destroyed a He 111 over the mouth of the River Thames and claimed a Bf 109 as probably destroyed over Chatham on 24 September. He helped in the damaging of a Junkers Ju 88 medium bomber off Dover on 5 October. Returning to the vicinity of Chatham on 11 October, he destroyed a Bf 109. The next day he claimed three Bf 109s as probably destroyed, two of which were to the southeast of London, and damaged a fourth. Another Bf 109 was probably destroyed by Bodie over Ashford on 13 October. He repeated this success on 25 October, probably shooting down a further Bf 109 in the same area.

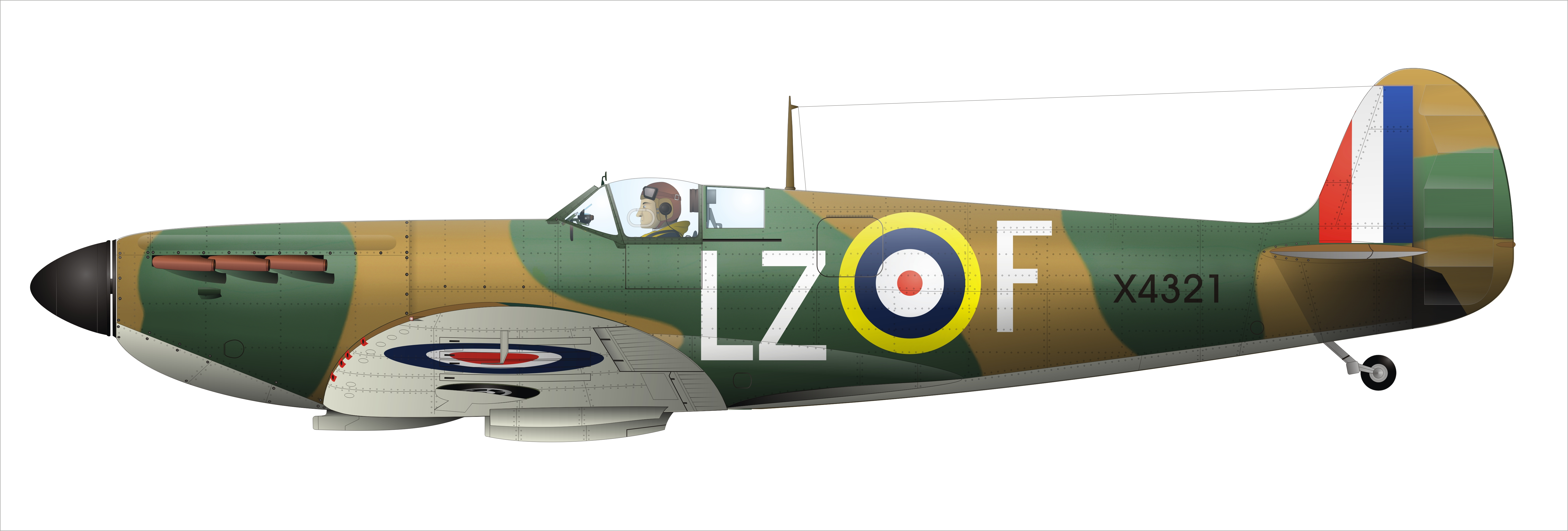
A depiction of Bodie's Supermarine Spitfire fighter, 1940

Bodie's successes in the fighting over southeast England were subsequently recognised with an award of the Distinguished Flying Cross. The citation for the DFC was published in The London Gazette and read:

One day in September, 1940, Pilot Officer Bodie was engaged on an offensive patrol with his squadron when a large formation of enemy bombers was encountered. Observing a Dornier 17 about 1,000 feet below him, he dived to the attack and destroyed it. Climbing through cloud, he then attacked two unescorted Dornier 17's, causing them to break formation. Pressing home his attack on the hostile aircraft in turn, he eventually caused them to crash into the sea. He has displayed great courage, skill and determination, and has destroyed at least six enemy aircraft.

— London Gazette, No. 34987, 8 November 1940

On 14 November, with the Battle of Britain officially over, Bodie probably destroyed one more Bf 109, this time over Dover. At the suggestion of his squadron commander, Athol Forbes, Bodie wrote an account of his experiences during the Battle of Britain, and this was subsequently edited and published in 1942 as a chapter in the book 'Ten Fighter Boys'.

=== Later war service ===
No. 66 Squadron's activities declined during the winter months due to the weather. However, on 20 December, Bodie, flying with Flight Lieutenant G. Christie, made one of Fighter Command's earliest hit-and-run sorties to France, successfully attacking an airfield at Le Touquet. In early 1941 the squadron began to reequip with Mk IIa Spitfires.

In March, Bodie was posted to No. 310 Squadron as an acting flight lieutenant. His new unit, the flying personnel being mostly Czechs who had escaped the German occupation of their country, was equipped with the Hawker Hurricane fighter Mk IIa fighter and flew occasional offensive sorties to France and patrols along the east coast of England. Bodie was leader of one of the squadron's flights. Two months later, his substantive rank was made up to flying officer.

Bodie was transferred to the Spitfire-equipped No. 152 Squadron in June. This was based at Portreath and carried out bomber escort duties, flying to German-occupied France, also performing similar duties for Coastal Command aircraft to the west of England. Early in 1942, the squadron moved to Northern Ireland, patrolling over the Irish Sea from Eglinton near County Londonderry. On 24 February, Bodie crashed a Spitfire at Eglinton while performing aerobatics. He was killed in the accident. Survived by his wife, he is buried at St. Canice Churchyard in the village of Eglinton. His DFC is held by his former school, Ipswich School.

Bodie is credited with having shot down ten German aircraft, half of which being shared with other pilots. One aerial victory was unconfirmed and he is also credited with ten probably destroyed, two shared with other pilots. He damaged three aircraft and shared in damaging a fourth.
