= Colin Simpson (rugby union) =

England international rugby union player

- Full name: Colin Peter Simpson
- Born: 21 September 1942 (age 84) Ipswich, England
- School: Ipswich School

Rugby union career
- Position: Wing
International career
Years	Team	Apps	(Points)
1965	England	1	(0)

Colin Peter Simpson (born 21 September 1942) is an English former international rugby union player.

Simpson was born in Ipswich and educated at Ipswich School.

A goal-kicking winger, Simpson played his early rugby union for the Army while at Sandhurst, with his late try and conversion securing the 1963 Services Championship against the RAF. He also appeared at club level for Harlequins and in 1964 represented the Barbarians in a match against the All Blacks.

Simpson was capped once for England, featuring on the left wing in their 1965 Five Nations opener against Wales at Cardiff, a match played under wet and muddy conditions. Wales won 14–3 and Simpson was subsequently dropped.

== See also ==
- List of England national rugby union players
