= Ipswich School =

Public school in Suffolk, England

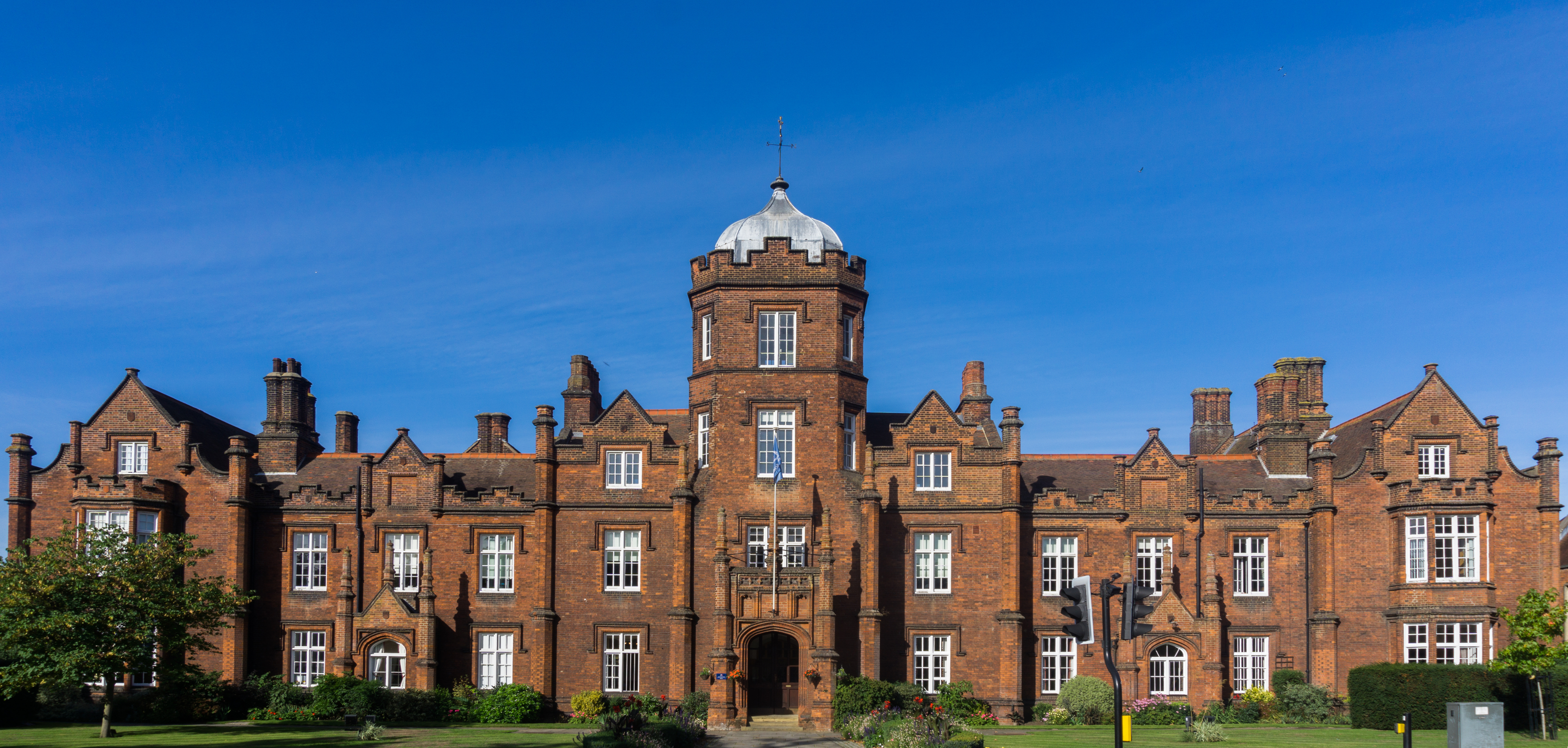

Location
- Suffolk, IP1 3SG; England; 52°03′51″N 1°09′06″E

Information
- Type: Public school Private day and boarding school
- Motto: Semper Eadem (Latin for Always The Same)
- Established: 1399; 627 years ago
- Department for Education URN: 124881 Tables
- Chairman of Governors: Henry Staunton
- Headmaster: Nick Gregory
- Gender: Coeducational
- Age: 3 to 18
- Enrolment: c.850 pupils
- Houses: 6 day houses and 1 boarding house
- Colours: Navy blue, blue, grey, yellow and white
- Publication: The Ipswichian, The OI Journal, The Occasional
- Visitor: King Charles III
- Website: http://www.ipswich.school

Ipswich School is a public school (English fee-charging boarding and day school) for pupils aged 3 to 18 in Ipswich, Suffolk, England.

North of the town centre, Ipswich School has four parts on three adjacent sites. The Pre-Prep and Nursery were established in 1883 with the aim of preparing children aged 7 to 11 for entry into the Senior School. The Senior School occupies the main school site. The main buildings are a distinctive example of Victorian architecture, with Tudor-style brick. The main building and chapel are both Grade II listed. The school buildings surround a central playing field and cricket square along with the Cricket Pavilion. The remainder of the School's sport's fields are located at a nearby site on the edge of the town. The School has a new purpose-built music school, adjacent to the Cricket Pavilion.

Within the Senior School the students are divided into three: the Lower School (Years 7 and 8), the Middle School (Years 9–11) and the Sixth Form (Years 12 and 13).

The School operates on an independent, fee-charging basis, with a few scholarships including sports, academic and art and music and means-tested bursaries. It selects pupils by the use of entrance exams. The School was designated as having a Church of England Religious Character. The school has, however, not chosen to register as having a Religious Charter under the 2009 order.

== History ==
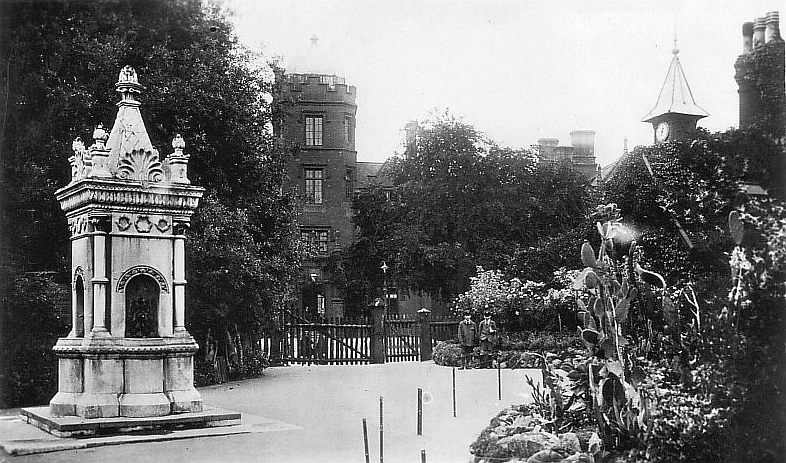
A view of Ipswich School from Christchurch Park, as seen in an old postcard

The oldest record that may refer to the school in Ipswich goes back to 1399, in a legal dispute over unpaid fees. The first recorded mention of a grammar school in Ipswich is 1416. The school was most likely set up by the Gild Merchant of Ipswich, which became the Guild of Corpus Christi. The sons of the ruling burgesses were educated for a fee, and the sons of nobility and gentry could attend at higher fees.

From 1483 the school moved to a house bequeathed by ex-pupil Richard Felaw, a merchant and politician. His will also provided rental income for the school and stated that, for Ipswich children, only those parents with income over a certain amount should pay fees.

=== Cardinal's College of St. Mary in Ipswich ===
In 1528, building work began on an ambitious project for a college in Ipswich. This college, formally Cardinal's College of St. Mary in Ipswich, was inspired by the earlier dual foundations by William of Wykeham and Henry VI. Thomas Wolsey, Cardinal Archbishop of York and Lord Chancellor of England, funded the college by ''suppressing' local religious houses such as Rumburgh Priory in East Suffolk and Bayham Old Abbey in Kent, despite a local Kentish riot delaying suppression. The existing grammar school was incorporated into the College. Wolsey, who was from Ipswich and may have attended the Ipswich grammar school, intended Cardinal College to be a feeder for Cardinal College, Oxford. However, Wolsey fell out of favour with King Henry VIII and the college in Ipswich was demolished in 1530 while still half-built. Only the water gate, kept in a vulnerable position, remains. The assets were misappropriated by Henry, and used for the construction of palaces including the Palace of Whitehall.

The pupils intended for Cardinal College returned to Felaw's house.

The play Henry VIII by William Shakespeare mentions both foundations during a recounting of the life of Cardinal Wolsey; it was the college of the University of Oxford that outlasted him and became widely known:

Those twins of learning that he rais'd in you,
Ipswich and Oxford! One of which fell with him,
Unwilling to outlive the good that did it;
The other, though unfinish'd, yet so famous

Ipswich School claims that this passage from Shakespeare refers to them, something which has been repeated elsewhere. However, this is a misapprehension that has gone unchallenged - Shakespeare was referring to the Cardinal College founded in 1528. Ipswich School equates themselves to Cardinal College, which is not the case.

=== Ipswich School from Elizabeth I to 1614 ===
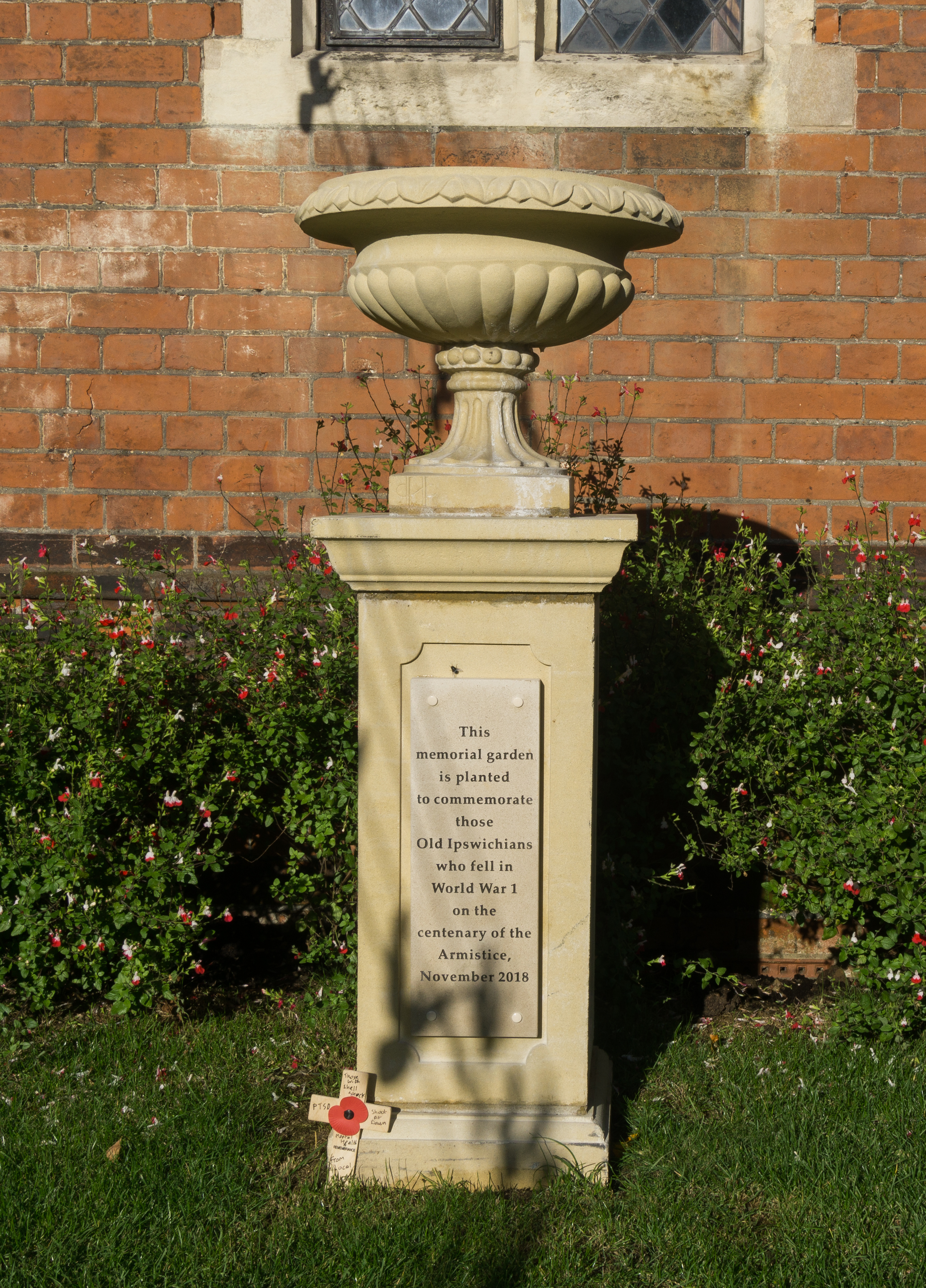
Ipswich School WWI Memorial Garden

After Wolsey's downfall in 1530, his former ally Thomas Cromwell ensured the survival of the School by securing for it a new endowment from King Henry VIII and the status of a royal foundation. This was confirmed by Queen Elizabeth I in the charter that she granted to the School in 1566. For part of the School's history it was known as Queen Elizabeth's Grammar School, Ipswich. The School's coat of arms and motto, Semper Eadem (Always the Same), are those of Elizabeth I. The Monarch of the United Kingdom is the School's Visitor.

=== From 1614 to 1851 ===
In 1614 the school moved across the road to the Blackfriar's refectory. During the reign of James I part of the Blackfriars Monastery was appropriated for use as a classroom, and the Blackfriars remained the School's home until 1842 when the building was deemed to be unsafe. For a few years teaching was carried on in temporary premises in Lower Brook Street.

=== Since 1851 ===
In 1851 Prince Albert laid the foundation stone for the School's first purpose-built premises in Henley Road. By 1852 the new buildings were in use. The School has remained on the Henley Road site ever since.

The Town Library of Ipswich with books dating back to the 15th century is located in the headmaster's study where it is held by the school on behalf of the town of Ipswich.

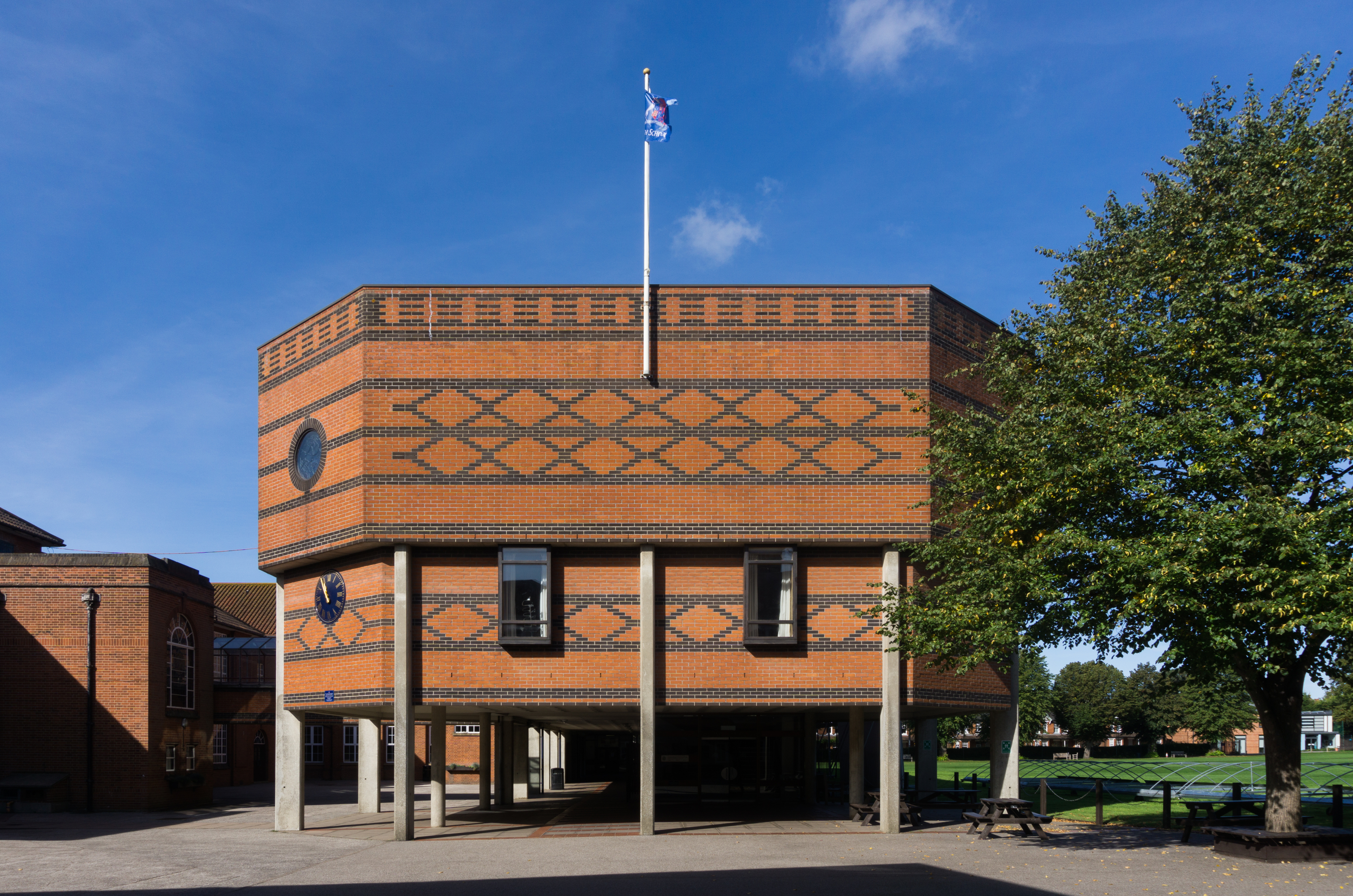
Ipswich School Library Building

The school's library building was the final work of local architect Birkin Haward and was officially opened in 1982 by Sir Hugh Casson. Raised on concrete pillars, it is constructed in red brick with horizontal blue brick banding detail. It was given Grade II listed heritage status in 2018 in recognition of its innovative design and modern expression of a traditional approach to materials and form. For the library, John Piper was commissioned to design four circular stained glass roundels, one for each corner of the new building, which were made in 1981 in collaboration with glassmakers Patrick Reyntiens and David Wasley. Each depicts a stylised and colourful face of the Green Man, which at the same time is used to symbolise one of each of the four seasons, the four ages of man, and the four classical elements. The north-east window, at its brightest in the early morning, represents the season of spring, the age of youth and the element of earth. The south-east window, which shines brightly in the late morning, denotes summer, air and adulthood. The south-west window, most radiant in the afternoon, signifies autumn, maturity and fire. Lastly, the north-west corner, which receives the least direct sunlight, portrays winter, old age and water.

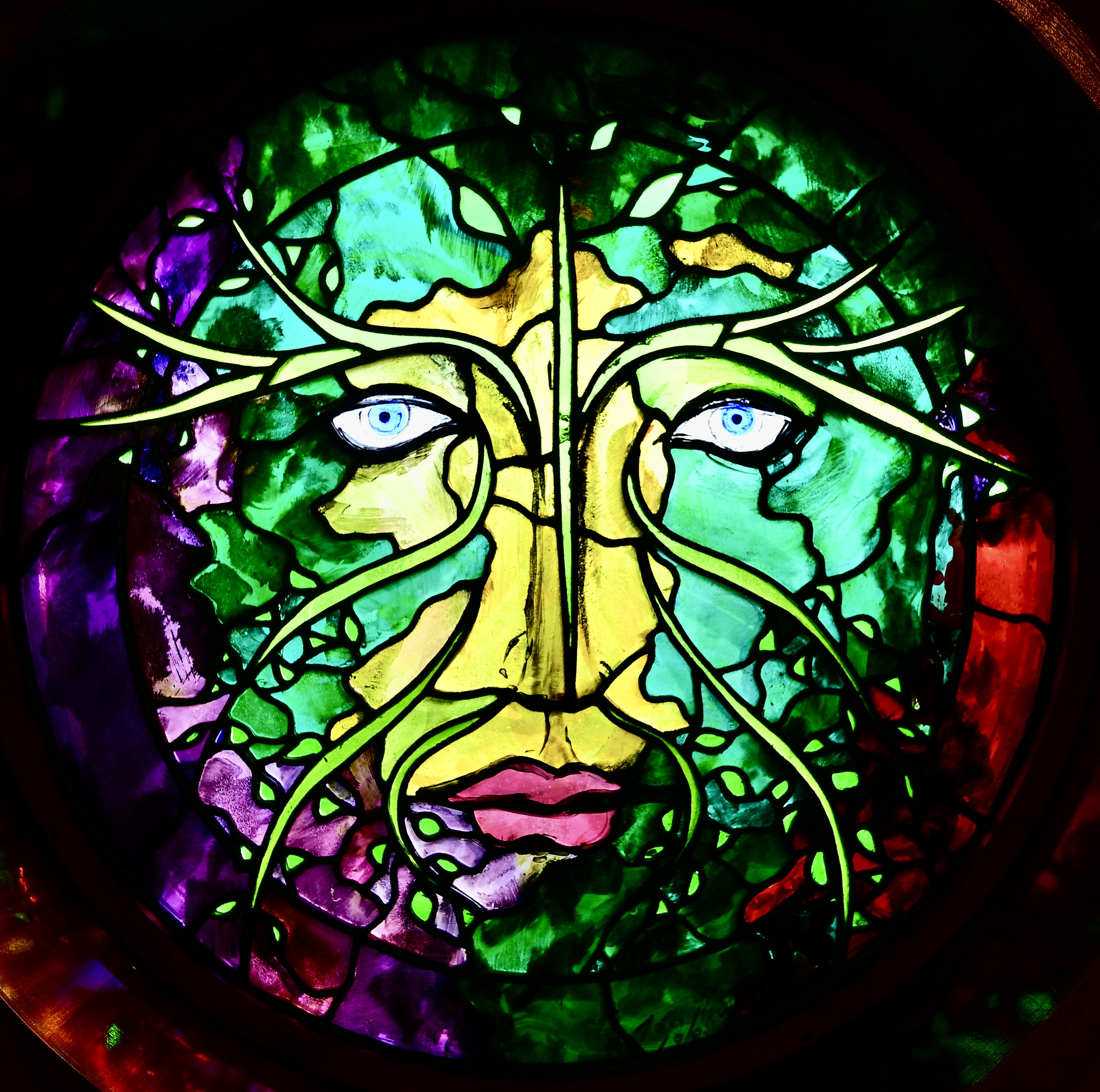
John Piper: Spring - Youth - Earth

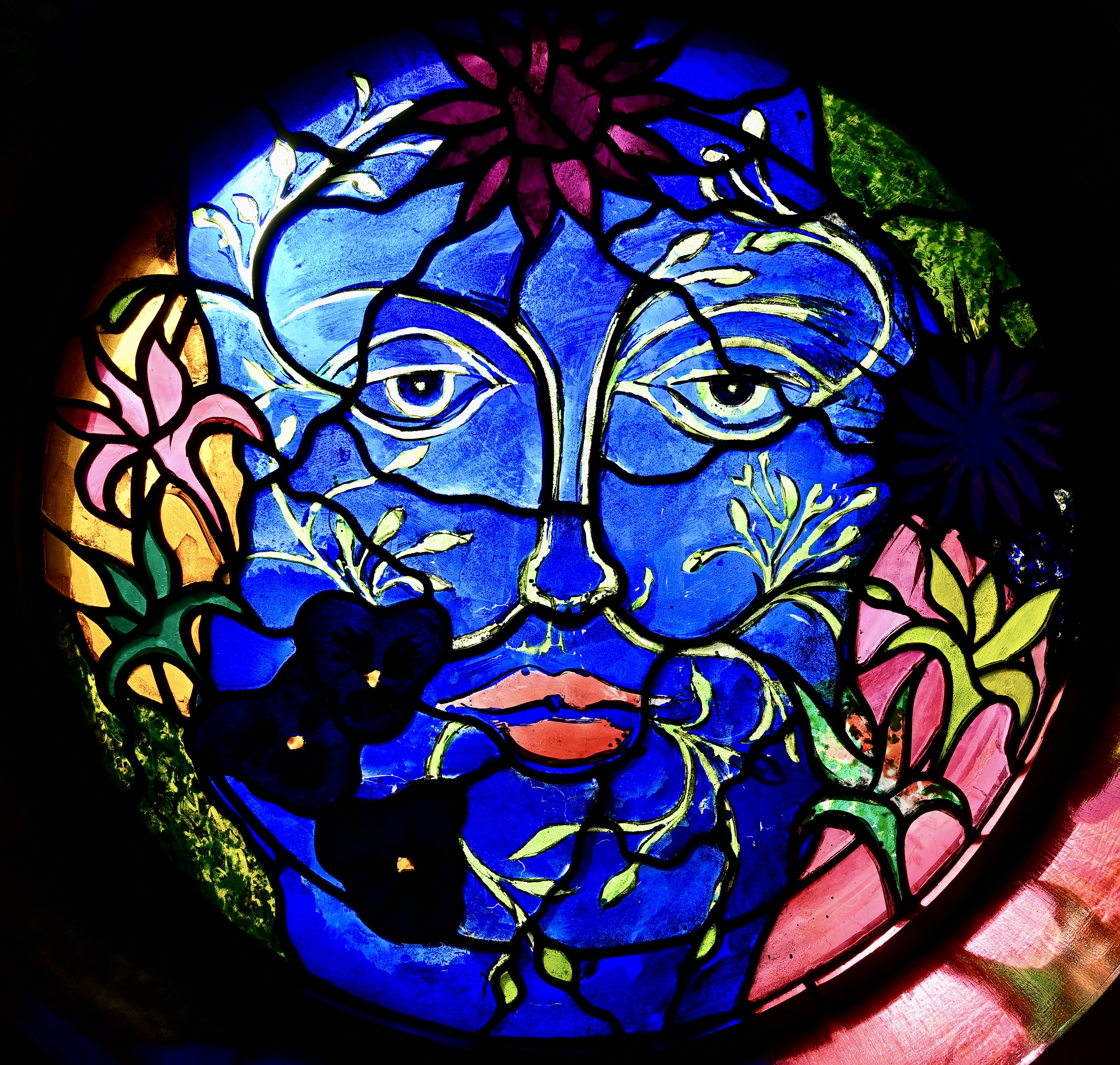
John Piper: Summer - Adulthood - Air

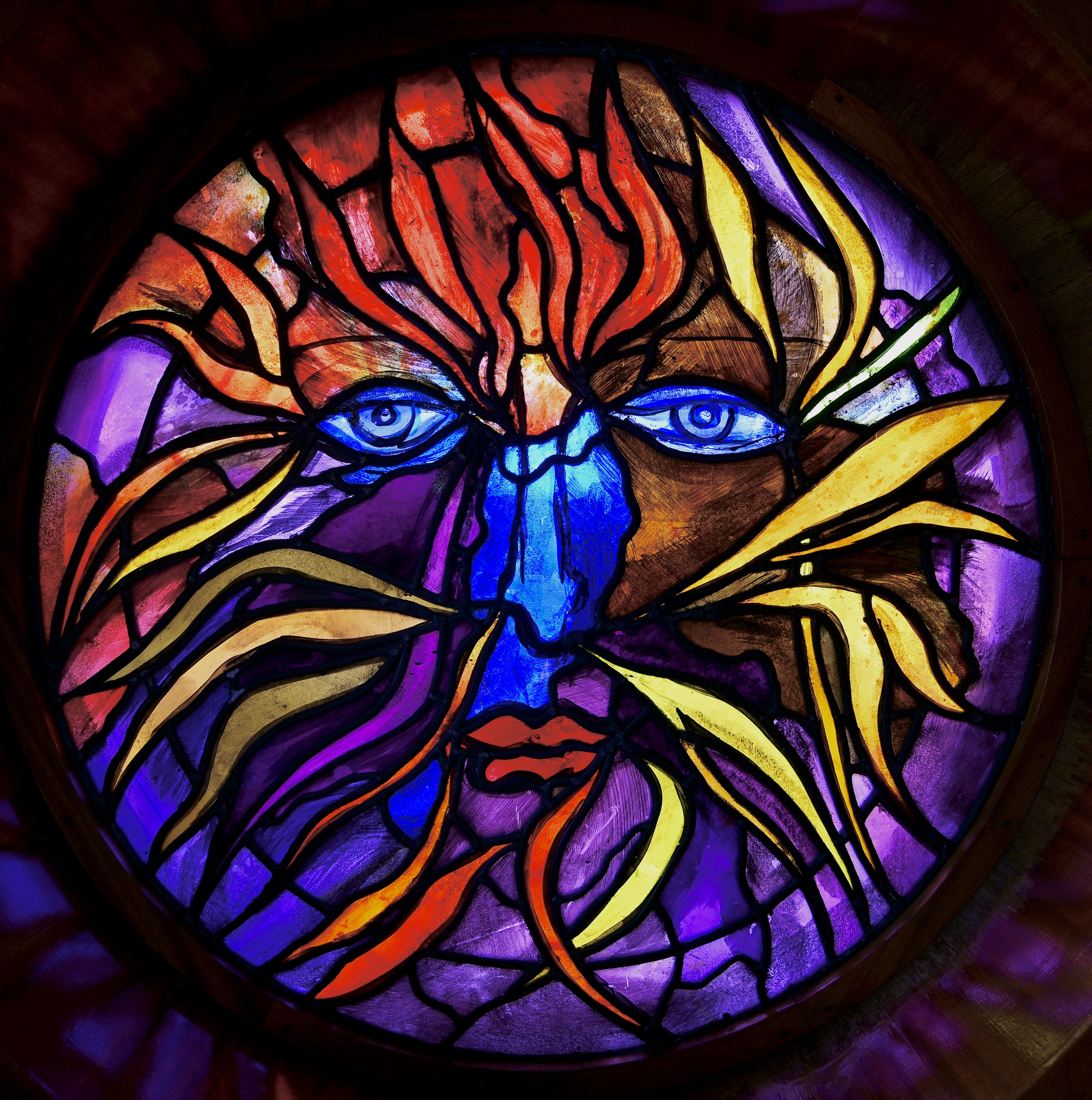
John Piper: Autumn - Maturity - Fire

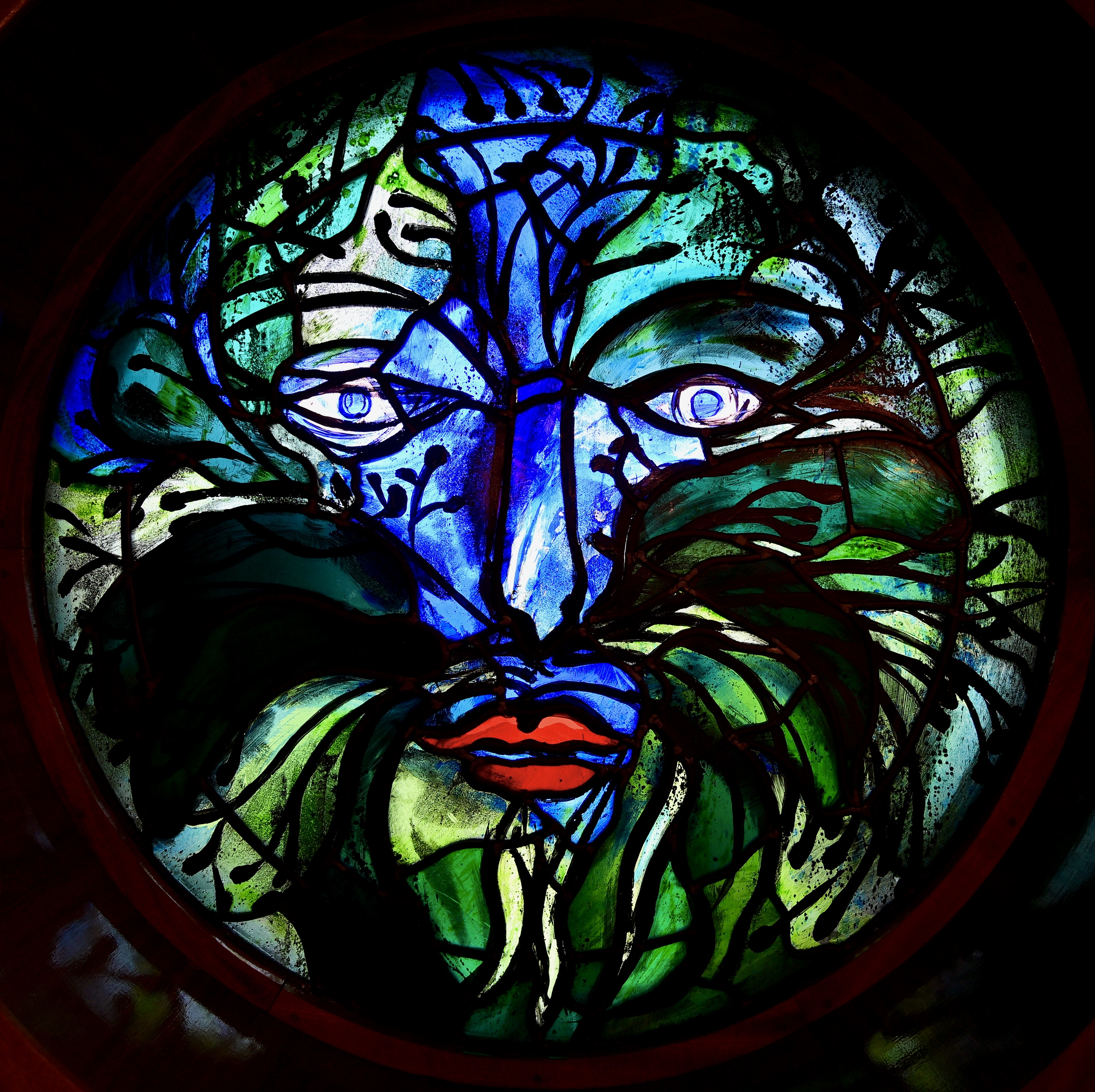
John Piper: Winter - Old Age - Water

=== Current school organisation ===
More recently the School has moved away from the traditional full boarding ethos still held by similar schools such as Eton and Harrow. The number of boarding houses has reduced to one and the majority of students are day pupils. The School has flourished under this new approach.

=== Houses ===
The school has five day houses – Holden, Rigaud, School, Broke and Felaw – into which all pupils are filtered from year 9/Upper 6th Form onwards, and a single large boarding house – Westwood.

=== Sports and activities ===
The school offers a wide selection of sports, ranging from the traditional rugby, hockey, netball and cricket, to others such as indoor hockey, sailing, and Eton Fives, being one of a handful of schools in the country to have Fives courts. The school also offers other activities, including the Torino Debating Society, the Dead Poets Society (for A-Level English students) led by Sixth Form pupils, a Sub Aqua Club, Duke of Edinburgh Award, and a Combined Cadet Force with Army and Air Force sections. The school's music department provides several orchestras, ensembles, and choirs. Plays are staged every year, in either Great School or Little School.

==== Cricket Ground ====
Ipswich School Ground
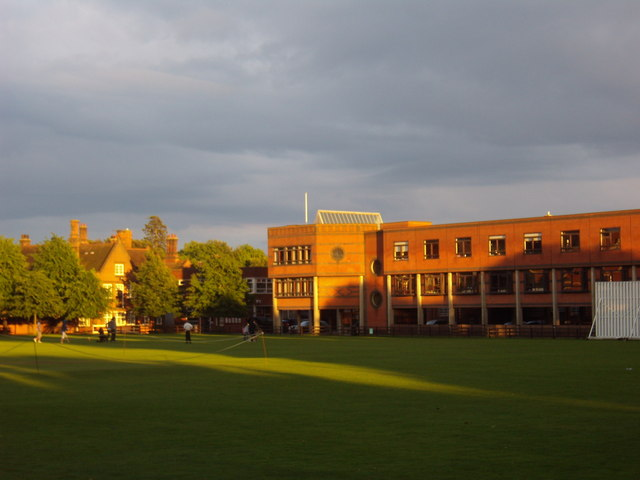
- Interactive map of Ipswich School Ground

Ground information
- Country: England
- Establishment: 1859 (first recorded match)

Team information
| Suffolk | (1935–1938, 1960–1976, 1986–2000 & 2007–present) |
- As of 13 August 2010; Source: Ground profile

The first recorded cricket match on the school ground was in 1859, when Suffolk played an All England Eleven. The ground hosted its first Minor Counties Championship match in 1935 when Suffolk played Hertfordshire. To date the ground has hosted 33 Minor Counties Championship matches and 2 MCCA Knockout Trophy matches.

The ground has also hosted a single List A match between Suffolk and Kent in the 1966 Gillette Cup.

=== School publications ===
The three main publications are The Ipswichian which is the annual School magazine, The OI Journal which is a publication for Old Ipswichians and The Occasional. The Occasional is the school newspaper published every Monday and is written by pupils. It is edited by the Communications Manager. It contains articles of note and interest to the members of the school such as sports results and upcoming events. It has recently celebrated its 1000th issue.

== Headmasters ==
William Howorth was the first Headmaster. previously the school had a master and an Usher as deputy.

- 2024- Nick Gregory
- 2010–2024 Nicholas J. Weaver
- 1993–2010 Ian Galbraith
- 1972–1993 John Blatchly
- 1950–1972 Patrick Hassell Frederick Mermagen
- 1933–1950 Truman Tanqueray
- 1919–1933 Edward Charles Sherwood
- 1906–1918 Arthur Kenelm Watson
- 1894–1906 Philip Edwin Raynor
- 1883–1894 Frederick Herbert Browne
- 1858–1883 Hubert Ashton Holden
- 1850–1858 Stephen Jordan Rigaud
- 1843–1850 John Fenwick
- 1832–1843 James Collett Ebden
- 1800–1832 William Howorth

== Notable Old Ipswichians ==
Former pupils, known as "Old Ipswichians" include:

- Thomas Howard, 2nd Duke of Norfolk (1443–1524), soldier and statesman
- Cardinal Thomas Wolsey (c. 1473–1530), statesman under Henry VIII.
- Sir Robert Hitcham (c.1572–1636), judge and Member of Parliament
- William Kirby (entomologist) (1759–1850)
- Sir Philip Broke (1776–1841), naval officer
- Sir Charles Broke Vere (1779–1843), army officer
- William King (1786–1865), Physician, Philanthropist and pioneer of the cooperative movement.
- Charles Keene (1823–1891), artist for Punch
- Sir John Gordon Sprigg (1830–1913), Prime Minister of the Cape Colony
- Charles Cooke (1836–1892), cricketer and clergyman
- Sir Edward Poynter Bt (1836–1919), artist and President of the Royal Academy
- Sir H. Rider Haggard (1856–1925), author of King Solomon's Mines, She and other works.
- Sir Charles Scott Sherrington (1857–1952), Nobel laureate and physician
- Lieutenant-General Sir Edwin Alderson (1859–1927), first commander Canadian Expeditionary Force in World War I.
- Percy John Heawood (1861–1955), mathematician and Vice-Chancellor of Durham University
- Adair Roche, Baron Roche (1871–1956), barrister and law lord
- Cecil Howard Lay (1885–1956), architect, artist and poet
- Edward Ardizzone (1900–1979), artist
- Sir Charles Frank (1911–1998), physicist
- Geoffrey Rees-Jones (1914–2004), former Welsh rugby international.
- Peter Brunt (1917–2005), historian
- Crelin Bodie (1920–1942), a flying ace of the Royal Air Force during the Second World War
- Ian Hendry (1931—1984), film, television and theatre actor
- Air Commodore Timothy Thorn (1942-2026), Royal Air Force pilot
- Colin Simpson (born 1942), England national rugby player
- Right Reverend Peter Wheatley (born 1947), former Bishop of Edmonton
- Henry Staunton (born 1948), businessman
- Kevin Ash (1959–2013), journalist, author, and motorcycling correspondent at The Daily Telegraph
- Nils Blythe (born 1956), journalist and presenter
- Mark Bailey (born 1960), England national rugby player
- David Sawer (born 1961), composer
- Richard Edgar-Wilson (born 1963), tenor
- Peter Florence (born 1964), festival director and founder of the Hay Festival
- John Penrose (born 1964), Conservative Member of Parliament
- Russell Heap (born 1968), cricketer
- Tom Withers (born 1968), music producer and DJ better known as 'Klute'
- James King, film critic and broadcaster
- Adam Rutherford (born 1974), geneticist, author, and broadcaster
- Nicholas Pert (born 1981), chess grandmaster
- Richard Mann (born 1982), cricketer
- Jack Hawkins (born 1985), actor
- Harry Martin (born 1992), Great Britain Hockey Team London 2012
- Alexander Albon (born 1996), Thai-British Formula 1 Driver for Williams Racing
- Hannah Martin (field hockey), (born 1994), GB and England Hockey player, 2020 Olympic Bronze medalist, 2022 Commonwealth Games Gold medalist.
- George Henry Alexander Clowes, (born 1877), doctor and medical researcher. He was responsible for mobilising Eli Lilly resources to mass-produce insulin.
- Henry Patten, (born 1996), British tennis player, 2024 winner of Wimbledon Men's Doubles.

== See also ==
- List of the oldest schools in the United Kingdom

== Sources ==
- John M. Blatchly, A Famous Antient Seed-Plot of Learning – A History of Ipswich School (Ipswich 2003).
- G.R.W. Webb, The History of Ipswich School and Education in Ipswich (Ipswich 2005).
