= Semer, Suffolk =

Village in Suffolk, England

Coordinates: 52.081°N 0.918°E

Semer
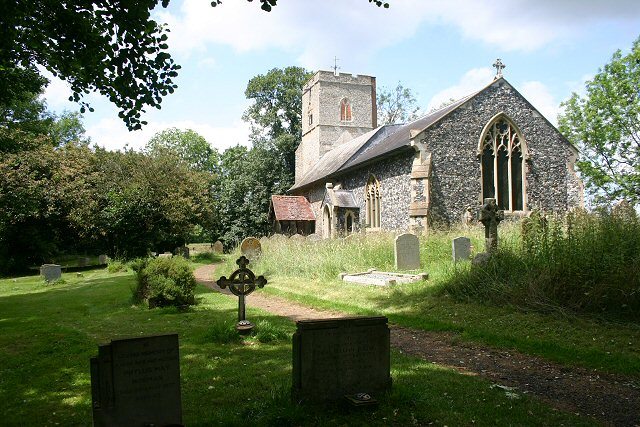
- All Saints Church

- Location within Suffolk
- Population: 130 (population of the whole parish in 2011)
- District: Babergh
- Shire county: Suffolk
- Region: East
- Country: England
- Sovereign state: United Kingdom
- Post town: Ipswich
- Postcode district: IP7
- UK Parliament: South Suffolk

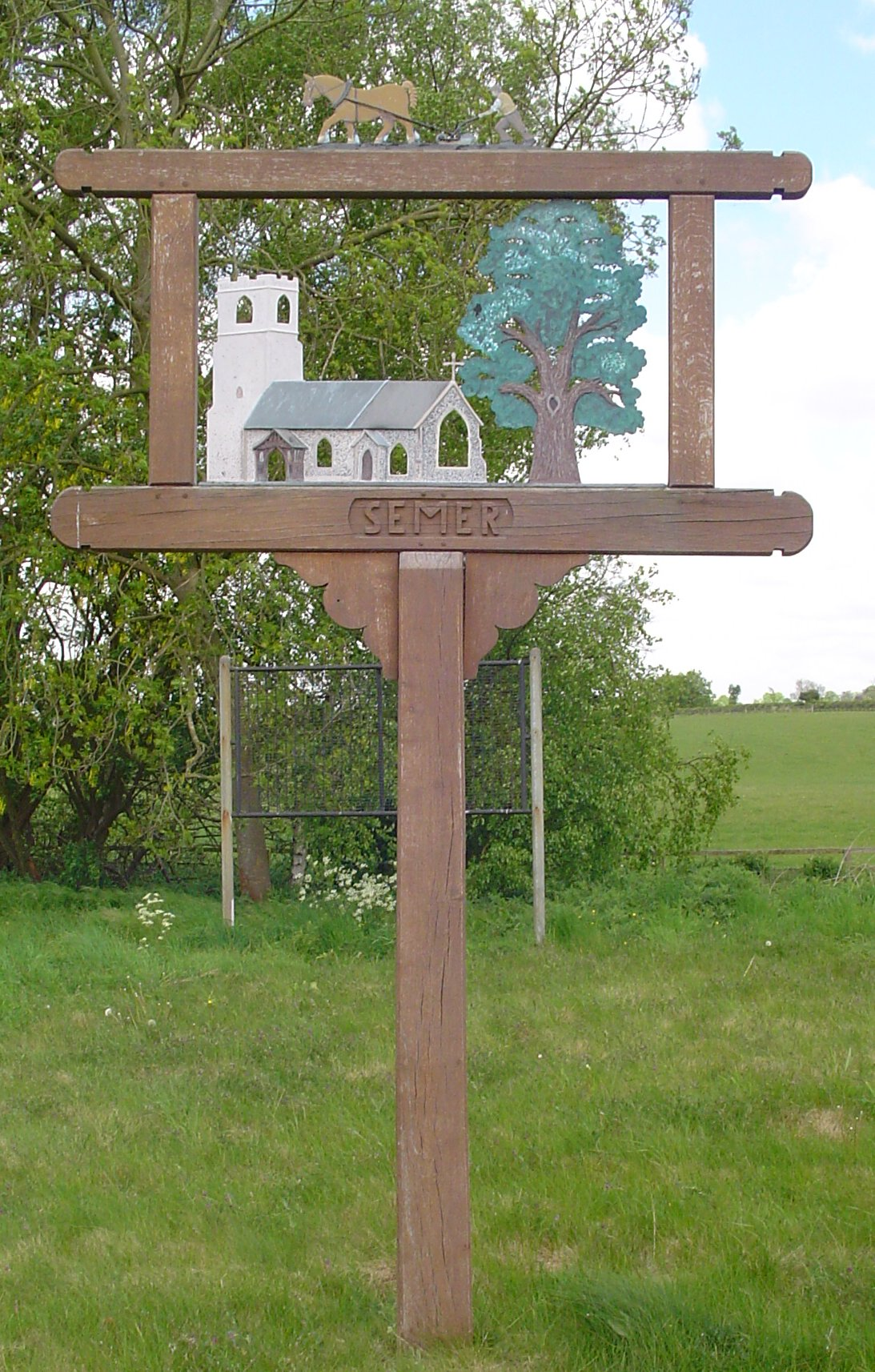
Signpost in Semer

Semer is a small village and civil parish in Suffolk, England. Located adjacent to a bridge over the River Brett on the B1115 between Hadleigh and Stowmarket, it is part of Babergh district. The parish also contains the hamlets of Ash Street and Drakestone Green.

The parish was recorded in the 2011 census as having a population of 130, down from 158 in the previous census.

== History ==
The name Semer is derived from the Old English elements "sǣ" (lake or sea) and "mere" (pool or lake). As the name therefore means "lake pool", it may be that the mere element was added at a later date.

Semer is recorded in the Domesday Book as belonging to Bury St Edmunds Abbey in both 1066 and 1086. The abbey acted as both Lord of the manor and Tenant-in-chief. It is recorded as home to 20 households: six villagers, 13 small holders and one slave. It is recorded as having enough ploughland for 3 lord's plough teams and 3 men's plough teams; and the village also had 12 acres (4.9 ha) of meadow, a mill, a church, 0.25 acres (0.10 ha) of church land, 16 cattle, 2 cobs, 24 pigs and 97 sheep.

In 1086 the village is valued as worth £6 a year to its lord, the Abbey, a £1 increase on its value in 1066. Its taxable value is recorded as 3.8 geld units and 2.5 villtax.

== All Saints Church ==
The small church is set a few hundred yards off of a minor road across a meadow beside the River Brett, It is almost entirely Victorianised with a chancel that was rebuilt in 1870. One notable feature of the graveyard, to the east of the church, is a marble Edwardian angel scattering roses.

The church has a plain square-cut font which is thought to be 14th-century, as is the nave. There is also a Royal Arms of King George III, painted before the union with Ireland. The church has been a Grade II listed building since 10 July 1980.

== Hamlets ==
=== Ash Street ===
The small hamlet of Ash Street is centred approximately 0.5 miles (1 km) east of Semer church; it is located to the north of a bridge over the River Brett.

Ash Street is recorded in the Domesday Book as a very small settlement of just five smallholders, with 6 acres (2.4 ha) of meadow and a mill; the hamlet had a taxable value of 1.5 geld units. Prior to the Norman Conquest of 1066, the hamlet was owned by an unnamed "Free Woman". After the Conquest it is recorded as under the Lordship of William the Conqueror's half-brother, Robert, Count of Mortain.

=== Drakestone Green ===
The small hamlet of Drakestone Green is centred approximately 1 mile (1.6 km) south of Semer church.
