= List of Leeds/Bradford MCCU players =

Leeds/Bradford MCC University, formerly Leeds/Bradford University Centre of Cricketing Excellence, was formed in 2005, and first appeared in first-class cricket in 2012. The players in this list have all played at least one first-class match for Leeds/Bradford MCCU. MCC funding came to an end in July 2020, although no matches were played in the 2020 season due to the restrictions put in place during the Coronavirus outbreak. In December 2019 the ECB announced that matches with MCCU teams would lose their first-class status as of the 2021 season.

Players are listed in order of appearance, where players made their debut in the same match, they are ordered by batting order.

== Key ==
General

- † – Wicket-keeper
- First – Year of First-class debut for Leeds/Bradford MCCU
- Last – Year of latest First-class match for Leeds/Bradford MCCU
- Mat – Number of First-class appearances for Leeds/Bradford MCCU

Batting

- Runs – Runs scored in career
- HS – Highest score
- Avg – Runs scored per dismissal
- * – Batsman remained not out

Bowling

- Balls – Balls bowled in career
- Wkt – Wickets taken in career
- BBI – Best bowling in an innings
- Ave – Average runs per wicket

Fielding

- Ca – Catches taken
- St – Stumpings effected
All statistics correct as of the end of the English 2019 cricket season.

== List of players ==
Leeds/Bradford MCC University First-class players
No.	Name	Nationality	First	Last	Mat	Runs	HS	Avg	Balls	Wkt	BBI	Ave	Ca	St	Ref(s)
No.	Name	Nationality	First	Last	Mat	Batting			Bowling				Fielding		Ref(s)
1	Ben Slater	England	2012	2012	2	39	15	9.75	0	–	–	–	0	0	
2	Jonathon Webb	England	2012	2013	4	77	38	9.62	0	–	–	–	3	0	
3	Harry Bush	United States	2012	2012	2	118	70	29.50	42	0	–	–	0	0	
4	Joe Leach	England	2012	2012	2	66	50	16.50	172	8	4/73	12.37	2	0	
5	Luis Reece ‡	England	2012	2013	4	289	114*	41.28	552	12	4/28	24.08	3	0	
6	Dan Hodgson †	England	2012	2012	2	77	64	19.25	0	–	–	–	6	0	
7	Rick Moore ‡	England	2012	2012	2	76	37	19.00	78	0	–	–	1	0	
8	Charlie Roebuck	England	2012	2014	2	31	27*	10.33	6	0	–	–	0	0	
9	Tom Hardman	England	2012	2012	2	65	44	16.25	216	3	2/51	59.66	1	0	
10	Matt Higginbottom	England	2012	2012	2	79	31*	79.00	174	4	2/22	30.00	0	0	
11	Ivan Thomas	England	2012	2014	6	57	11	11.40	903	13	3/39	29.15	2	0	
12	Alexander MacQueen	England	2012	2014	5	166	69	20.75	600	5	4/116	56.80	2	0	
13	Henry Thompson	England	2013	2016	6	114	40	12.66	18	0	–	–	2	0	
14	Nick Gubbins	England	2013	2015	5	104	31*	13.00	0	–	–	–	2	0	
15	Daniel Young	England	2013	2014	3	31	14	5.16	6	0	–	–	4	0	
16	Charlie MacLeod †	England	2013	2014	4	34	15	5.66	0	–	–	–	8	0	
17	Will Vanderspar ‡	England	2013	2014	4	163	60*	32.60	149	4	2/52	22.00	2	0	
18	Harry Rouse	England	2013	2015	4	84	23	16.80	672	6	3/45	70.83	0	0	
19	James Lee	England	2013	2013	2	63	34	15.75	312	15	7/45	11.00	1	0	
20	Zafir Patel	India	2013	2014	3	20	16	5.00	432	5	2/32	49.60	1	0	
21	Christian Davis ‡	England	2014	2016	4	174	65	34.80	30	0	–	–	0	0	
22	Peter Ross	Scotland	2014	2014	2	17	16	8.50	0	–	–	–	2	0	
23	Andy Laws	England	2014	2014	2	12	7	6.00	42	1	1/17	24.00	2	0	
24	Alex Lilley	England	2014	2016	5	95	51*	47.50	720	15	5/41	25.20	2	0	
25	Billy Root	England	2015	2016	4	223	133	44.60	12	0	–	–	0	0	
26	Logan Weston	England	2015	2016	3	30	22	7.50	0	–	–	–	5	0	
27	George Scott	England	2015	2016	4	37	16*	12.33	126	2	2/67	60.50	2	0	
28	Chris Wakefield †	England	2015	2015	2	7	7	3.50	0	–	–	–	4	0	
29	Liam Watkinson	England	2015	2016	4	71	35	23.66	540	5	3/132	69.40	1	0	
30	Joe Ellis-Grewal	England	2015	2015	2	44	42	22.00	338	6	4/118	33.50	0	0	
31	Douglas Pratt	England	2015	2015	2	2	2*	–	320	5	2/51	31.00	0	0	
32	Steve Bullen ‡	England	2015	2017	5	196	56	24.50	27	0	–	–	0	0	
33	Ashley Gowers †	England	2016	2016	2	38	38	38.00	0	–	–	–	1	2	
34	Archie Ogden	England	2016	2016	2	24	24	24.00	223	4	2/80	43.00	0	0	
35	Moin Ashraf ‡	England	2016	2017	3	24	24	24.00	339	0	–	–	1	0	
36	Chris Harwood	United States	2016	2016	1	–	–	–	108	1	1/103	103.00	1	0	
37	Ben Shoare	England	2017	2017	2	58	47	14.50	48	1	1/28	28.00	1	0	
38	Martin Andersson	England	2017	2017	2	16	12	4.00	0	–	–	–	4	0	
39	Peter McDermott	England	2017	2017	2	46	20	11.50	0	–	–	–	0	0	
40	Oliver Graham	England	2017	2017	2	56	41	14.00	316	4	2/60	47.00	1	0	
41	Craig Wallace	Scotland	2017	2017	2	109	35	27.25	0	–	–	–	0	0	
42	Jack Potticary †	England	2017	2017	2	72	32	18.00	0	–	–	–	0	0	
43	William Cook	England	2017	2017	2	45	42	11.25	210	2	1/33	101.00	0	0	
44	Seb Feszczur-Hatchett	England	2017	2017	2	35	24*	11.66	348	2	2/91	110.00	0	0	
45	Oliver Bocking	England	2017	2017	2	1	1*	0.33	348	7	4/52	31.85	0	0	
46	Daniel Houghton	England	2017	2017	1	35	29	35.00	150	0	–	–	0	0	
47	Josh Haynes	England	2019	2019	2	38	20	9.50	318	4	3/37	48.25	1	0	
48	Taylor Cornall	England	2019	2019	2	43	19	10.75	0	–	–	–	2	0	
49	Oliver Batchelor	England	2019	2019	2	23	21	5.75	0	–	–	–	0	0	
50	Angus Dahl ‡ (Note: Born at Islington in 1999 and educated at Cranleigh School, Dahl also played Second XI cricket for Surrey in 2017 and 2018, having played for the county's age-group teams.)	England	2019	2019	2	106	46	26.50	192	2	2/41	64.00	1	0	
51	Saad Ashraf	England	2019	2019	2	109	62	27.25	0	–	–	–	1	0	
52	Darren Ironside	England	2019	2019	2	52	24	13.00	36	2	2/20	20.00	0	0	
53	Johnny Read †	England	2019	2019	2	34	15	8.50	0	–	–	–	5	0	
54	Andrew Neal	England	2019	2019	2	28	15	7.00	306	4	3/77	49.75	1	0	
55	Joshua Fallows	England	2019	2019	2	32	19	16.00	264	0	–	–	1	0	
56	Josh Holling	England	2019	2019	2	16	13	4.00	234	4	3/56	48.00	0	0	
57	Stephen Cantwell	England	2019	2019	2	73	43	73.00	330	2	1/67	92.50	1	0	
