= 2019 Marylebone Cricket Club University Matches =

Cricket tournament

- Dates: 26 March 2019 – 7 April 2019
- Administrator: England and Wales Cricket Board
- Cricket format: First-class

The 2019 Marylebone Cricket Club University Matches were a series of cricket matches that were played between the eighteen County Championship teams and the six Marylebone Cricket Club University teams (MCCU) of England and Wales. The first two rounds of fixtures were classed as first-class matches. Each county side played one fixture against an MCCU side ahead of the start of the 2019 County Championship.

In the opening round of fixtures, Alastair Cook scored 150 not out for Essex against Cambridge MCCU, in his first match since retiring from Test cricket. The opening round also saw Somerset beat Cardiff MCCU by 568 runs, a record margin for a first-class match in England. In the third and final round of matches, England Test cricketer Haseeb Hameed scored a double century, albeit in a fixture without first-class status.

In August 2019, the England and Wales Cricket Board (ECB) announced that the 2020 fixtures will be the last ones to have first-class status.

== Fixtures ==
=== Round 1 ===
26–28 March 2019
Scorecard

| Derbyshire | v | Leeds/Bradford MCCU |
| 398/5d (103 overs); Harvey Hosein 138* (220); Josh Holling 3/56 (13 overs) | | 200 (61.2 overs); Stephen Cantwell 43 (54); James Taylor 3/48 (12 overs) |
| 232/5d (65 overs); Luis Reece 96 (148); Josh Haynes 3/37 (15 overs) | | 94 (37.2 overs); Darren Ironside 24 (76); Ravi Rampaul 3/7 (5 overs) |

Derbyshire won by 336 runs
County Cricket Ground, Derby
Umpires: Hassan Adnan and Steve O'Shaughnessy

- Derbyshire won the toss and elected to bat.
- Sam Conners (Derbyshire), Josh Haynes, Taylor Cornall, Oliver Batchelor, Angus Dahl, Saad Ashraf, Darren Ironside, Andrew Neal, Joshua Fallows, Josh Holling and Stephen Cantwell (Leeds/Bradford MCCU) all made their first-class debuts.

26–28 March 2019
Scorecard

| Durham | v | Durham MCCU |
| 399 (121.2 overs); Will Smith 179 (331); Xavier Owen 3/60 (21 overs) | | 134 (59.5 overs); Tom Powe 33 (56); Ben Raine 4/30 (11.5 overs) |
| 237/3d (63 overs); Gareth Harte 108* (188); Xavier Owen 1/20 (6.4 overs) | | 206 (57.4 overs); Benedict Graves 66 (112); Chris Rushworth 3/37 (10 overs) |

Durham won by 296 runs
Riverside Ground, Chester-le-Street
Umpires: Neil Mallender and Neil Pratt

- Durham won the toss and elected to bat.
- Ross Greenwell (Durham), Lewis Bedford, Adam Dewes, Tom Powe, Charlie Scott, Chris Benjamin, Ben Sidwell and Jack Campbell (Durham MCCU) all made their first-class debuts.

26–28 March 2019
Scorecard

| Essex | v | Cambridge MCCU |
| 387/5d (89.3 overs); Alastair Cook 150* (248); Callum Guest 1/33 (14 overs) | | 176 (61.5 overs); Ben Seabrook 44* (96); Aaron Beard 3/24 (10 overs) |
| 232/3d (69 overs); Nick Browne 98 (187); Callum Guest 2/47 (18 overs) | | 157 (52.4 overs); Akil Greenidge 21 (41); Simon Harmer 3/28 (14 overs) |

Essex won by 286 runs
FP Fenner's Ground, Cambridge
Umpires: Paul Pollard and Paul Baldwin

- Essex won the toss and elected to bat.
- Vansh Bajaj, James Park-Johnson, Rishi Patel, Josh Cantrell and MJE Smith (Cambridge MCCU) all made their first-class debuts.

26–28 March 2019
Scorecard

| Loughborough MCCU | v | Leicestershire |
| 153 (54.5 overs); Joseph Kendall 37* (66); Tom Taylor 3/26 (16 overs) | | 524/5d (151 overs); Ateeq Javid 143 (326); Louis Kimber 1/52 (15 overs) |
| 151 (56.2 overs); Nick Welch 44 (62); Will Davis 3/37 (13 overs) |

Leicestershire won by an innings and 220 runs
Grace Road, Leicester
Umpires: Tim Robinson and Ian Ramage

- Leicestershire won the toss and elected to field.
- Tom Haynes, Louis Kimber, Joseph Kendall, Adam King, Ben Bhabra and Alex Evans (Loughborough MCCU) all made their first-class debuts.
- Hassan Azad (Leicestershire) scored his maiden century in first-class cricket.

26–28 March 2019
Scorecard

| Middlesex | v | Oxford MCCU |
| 365/5d (88 overs); Stephen Eskinazi 125 (166); Tom Heathfield 2/57 (14 overs) | | 131 (54.5 overs); Calvin Harrison 26 (68); Toby Roland-Jones 4/45 (15 overs) |
| 213/3d (63 overs); Nick Gubbins 105 (155); Toby Pettman 1/9 (9 overs) | | 177/4 (64 overs); Matthew Taylor 61* (175); Tim Murtagh 4/9 (11 overs) |

Match drawn
Merchant Taylors' School, Northwood
Umpires: Ben Debenham and Russell Warren

- Oxford MCCU won the toss and elected to field.
- Matthew Taylor, Christopher McBride, Calvin Harrison, Louie Shaw, Zaman Akhter and Chris Searle (Oxford MCCU) all made their first-class debuts.

26–28 March 2019
Scorecard

| Somerset | v | Cardiff MCCU |
| 387/4d (88 overs); James Hildreth 158* (238); Brad Evans 2/76 (16 overs) | | 118 (50.2 overs); Dan Douthwaite 42 (109); Lewis Gregory 4/28 (13 overs) |
| 345/9d (86 overs); Eddie Byrom 115* (159); Prem Sisodiya 4/79 (25 overs) | | 46 (16 overs); Sam Pearce 11 (20); Craig Overton 6/24 (8 overs) |

Somerset won by 568 runs
County Ground, Taunton
Umpires: Jeff Evans and Ian Blackwell

- Somerset won the toss and elected to bat.
- Steven Reingold, Yuvraj Odedra, Oskar Kolk and Dan Douthwaite (Cardiff MCCU) all made their first-class debuts.

=== Round 2 ===
31 March–2 April 2019
Scorecard

| Leeds/Bradford MCCU | v | Yorkshire |
| 119 (49.5 overs); Angus Dahl 46 (86); Matthew Waite 5/16 (12 overs) | | 489/8d (112 overs); Tom Kohler-Cadmore 176 (235); Andrew Neal 3/77 (22 overs) |
| 219 (74 overs); Saad Ashraf 62 (144); Duanne Olivier 2/30 (10.4 overs) |

Yorkshire won by an innings and 151 runs
Weetwood Playing Fields, Leeds
Umpires: Neil Pratt and Peter Hartley

- Leeds/Bradford MCCU won the toss and elected to bat.
- Duanne Olivier (Yorkshire) took his 400th first-class wicket.
- Matthew Waite (Yorkshire) took his maiden five-wicket haul in first-class cricket.

31 March–2 April 2019
Scorecard

| Hampshire | v | Oxford MCCU |
| 478/9d (105.2 overs); James Vince 139 (185); Toby Pettman 4/82 (24 overs) | | 114 (67 overs); Tom Heathfield 29 (89); Liam Dawson 4/11 (14 overs) |
| 66/4 (14 overs); Rilee Rossouw 22 (7); William Robertson 3/32 (7 overs) |

Match drawn
The Parks, Oxford
Umpires: Tom Lungley and Nick Cook

- Oxford MCCU won the toss and elected to field.
- No play was possible on day 3 due to rain.
- Mo Rizvi (Oxford MCCU) made his first-class debut.

31 March–2 April 2019
Scorecard

| Northamptonshire | v | Durham MCCU |
| 481/7d (110 overs); Josh Cobb 139 (159); William Angus 2/71 (18 overs) | | 136 (56.2 overs); Benedict Graves 31 (84); Rob Keogh 4/15 (9.2 overs) |
| 108/3 (40 overs); Ben Curran 64 (96); Jhathavedh Subramanyan 2/42 (17 overs) |

Match drawn
County Cricket Ground, Northampton
Umpires: Ian Ramage and Rob Bailey

- Northamptonshire won the toss and elected to bat.
- No play was possible on day 3 due to rain.
- Joe Emanuel, Nicholas MacDonagh and William Francis Angus (Durham MCCU) all made their first-class debuts.

31 March–2 April 2019
Scorecard

| Sussex | v | Cardiff MCCU |
| 480/9d (97 overs); David Wiese 139 (121); Prem Sisodiya 3/76 (18 overs) | | 203 (56.4 overs); Dan Douthwaite 100* (107); Chris Jordan 5/53 (14 overs) |
| 274/3 (50.3 overs); Stiaan van Zyl 103 (125); Steven Reingold 2/64 (10 overs) |

Match drawn
County Cricket Ground, Hove
Umpires: Billy Taylor and Mark Newell

- Cardiff MCCU won the toss and elected to field.
- Matthew Foster and Jack Gibbs (Cardiff MCCU) both made their first-class debuts.

31 March–2 April 2019
Scorecard

| Nottinghamshire | v | Cambridge MCCU |
| 565 (117.3 overs); Ben Duckett 216 (180); Callum Guest 3/100 (30.3 overs) | | 148 (53.1 overs); Ben Seabrook 35 (45); Samit Patel 3/21 (11 overs) |
| 231/5 (34 overs); Ben Duckett 82 (52); Sam Rippington 2/46 (8 overs) |

Match drawn
FP Fenner's Ground, Cambridge
Umpires: James Middlebrook and Neil Bainton

- Nottinghamshire won the toss and elected to bat.
- No play was possible on day 3 due to rain.
- Ben Duckett scored the fastest first-class double century by a Nottinghamshire batsman, in terms of balls faced (168).

31 March–2 April 2019
Scorecard

| Kent | v | Loughborough MCCU |
| 247/8d (73 overs); Sean Dickson 108* (207); Alex Evans 3/49 (19 overs) | | 248/9d (93.4 overs); Louis Kimber 62 (176); Matt Milnes 3/95 (21.4 overs) |
| 149/1 (44.3 overs); Zak Crawley 87 (127); Louis Kimber 1/34 (8.3 overs) |

Match drawn
St Lawrence Ground, Canterbury
Umpires: Martin Saggers and Chris Watts

- Loughborough MCCU won the toss and elected to field.
- Fred Klaassen (Kent) made his first-class debut.

=== Round 3 ===
4–6 April 2019
Scorecard

| Surrey | v | Durham MCCU |
| 586/8d (133.2 overs); Scott Borthwick 151 (200); Xavier Owen 2/100 (26 overs) | | 55/1 (25.4 overs); Adam Dewes 19* (71); Morné Morkel 1/12 (6 overs) |

Match drawn
The Oval, London
Umpires: Hassan Adnan and Mike Burns

- Durham MCCU won the toss and elected to field.

5–7 April 2019
Scorecard

| Glamorgan | v | Cardiff MCCU |
| 253/8d (69 overs); Billy Root 108* (166); Brad Evans 4/65 (18 overs) | | 230 (61.5 overs); Dan Douthwaite 95 (131); Craig Meschede 3/34 (10.5 overs) |
| 110/2d (25 overs); Nicholas Selman 46* (53); Kiran Carlson 1/14 (4 overs) |

Match drawn
Sophia Gardens, Cardiff
Umpires: Alex Wharf and Rob White

- Glamorgan won the toss and elected to bat.
- No play was possible on day 1 due to rain.

5–7 April 2019
Scorecard

| Gloucestershire | v | Oxford MCCU |
| 466/7d (112 overs); George Hankins 118 (173); Alex Wilkinson 3/85 (23 overs) | | 175 (71 overs); Tom Heathfield 85 (199); Ryan Higgins 3/30 (14 overs) |
| 33/0 (10 overs); Miles Hammond 28* (33) |

Match drawn
County Ground, Bristol
Umpires: Mark Newell and Jeremy Lloyds

- Oxford MCCU won the toss and elected to field.

5–7 April 2019
Scorecard

| Lancashire | v | Loughborough MCCU |
| 468/7d (126 overs); Haseeb Hameed 218 (336); William Pereira 2/48 (18 overs) | | 152 (66.2 overs); James Clifford 65 (102); James Anderson 3/21 (14 overs) |
| 314/3d (56 overs); Glenn Maxwell 82 (45); Elliot Hooper 2/105 (21 overs) | | 95/2 (30 overs); Louis Kimber 44* (63); James Anderson 1/5 (5 overs) |

Match drawn
Haslegrave Ground, Loughborough
Umpires: Michael Gough and James Middlebrook

- Lancashire won the toss and elected to bat.

5–7 April 2019
Scorecard

| Worcestershire | v | Cambridge MCCU |
| 215 (62.3 overs); Ed Barnard 40 (90); Karthik Suresh 5/44 (19 overs) | | 154 (55 overs); Jack Keeping 86 (155); Charlie Morris 3/50 (14 overs) |
| 272/4d (74 overs); Daryl Mitchell 74 (81); Callum Guest 1/28 (11 overs) | | 19/0 (8 overs); Alex Moen 14* (31) |

Match drawn
FP Fenner's Ground, Cambridge
Umpires: Ben Debenham and Chris Watts

- Cambridge MCCU won the toss and elected to field.

5–7 April 2019
Scorecard

| Warwickshire | v | Leeds/Bradford MCCU |
| 246 (64 overs); Aaron Thomason 62 (136); Joshua Fallows 3/36 (16 overs) | | 78 (28.4 overs); Furqan Shafiq 33 (27); Aaron Thomason 5/6 (5.4 overs) |
| 464/9d (105.3 overs); Adam Hose 200 (169); Josh Haynes 3/98 (24.3 overs) | | 102 (36.3 overs); Harry Killoran 29 (72); Jeetan Patel 3/12 (12.3 overs) |

Warwickshire won by 530 runs
Edgbaston, Birmingham
Umpires: Graham Lloyd and Tom Lungley

- Warwickshire won the toss and elected to bat.
