= 2017 Marylebone Cricket Club University Matches =

Cricket matches

- Dates: 28 March 2017 – 9 April 2017
- Administrator: England and Wales Cricket Board
- Cricket format: First-class

The 2017 Marylebone Cricket Club University Matches were a series of first-class cricket matches played between the eighteen County Championship teams and the six Marylebone Cricket Club University teams (MCCU) of England and Wales. Each county side played one fixture against a MCCU side ahead of the start of the 2017 County Championship. Following Leicestershire's match against Loughborough MCCU, bowler Charlie Shreck was found guilty of using obscene language or gestures. This was Leicestershire's fifth fixed penalty in 12 months, resulting in them being deducted 16 points for the 2017 County Championship season.

== Fixtures ==
=== Round 1 ===
28–30 March 2017
Scorecard

Nottinghamshire	v	Cambridge MCCU
339 (101.3 overs); Steven Mullaney 89 (162); Luke Chapman 6/78 (32 overs)		123 (49.1 overs); Tim Moses 25 (42); Samit Patel 5/43 (13 overs)
207/2d (56 overs); Riki Wessels 90* (107); Tim Moses 1/19 (8 overs)		79 (32.4 overs); Joe Tetley 42 (58); Harry Gurney 4/28 (8 overs)

Nottinghamshire won by 344 runs
FP Fenner's Ground, Cambridge
Umpires: Ben Debenham and Steve Garratt

- Nottinghamshire won the toss and elected to bat.
- Luke Chapman, Akil Greenidge, Callum Guest, Misem Zaidi, Tim Moses and Sam Rippington (Cambridge MCCU) all made their first-class debuts.

28–30 March 2017
Scorecard

Gloucestershire	v	Durham MCCU
405/7d (101.4 overs); William Tavaré 110 (234); Alex McGrath 4/108 (29 overs)		238 (64.4 overs); James McCollum 64 (115); Graeme van Buuren 4/18 (7.4 overs)

Match drawn
County Ground, Bristol
Umpires: Mike Burns and Tom Lungley

- Durham MCCU won the toss and elected to field.
- Abhiraj Singh, Joe Cooke, William Fraine, Benedict Graves, Matthew Jahanfar, Alex McGrath, Jason Marshall, James McCollum, Xavier Owen (Durham MCCU) and Oliver Currill (Gloucestershire) all made their first-class debuts.

28–30 March 2017
Scorecard

Kent	v	Leeds/Bradford MCCU
370/6d (94 overs); Darren Stevens 115 (152); Oliver Bocking 2/55 (16 overs)		204 (77 overs); Ben Shoare 47 (116); Adam Ball 2/10 (7 overs)
156/5 d (44 overs); Adam Ball 50 (89); Oliver Bocking 4/52 (15 overs)		110 (51.2 overs); Craig Wallace 23 (47); Will Gidman 3/0 (1.2 overs)

Kent won by 212 runs
St Lawrence Ground, Canterbury
Umpires: Mark Newell and Martin Saggers

- Kent won the toss and elected to bat.
- Martin Andersson, Oliver Bocking, William Cook, Seb Feszczur-Hatchett, Oliver Graham, Peter McDermott, Jack Potticary and Ben Shoare (Leeds/Bradford MCCU) all made their first-class debuts.

28–30 March 2017
Scorecard

Glamorgan	v	Cardiff MCCU
342/7d (89.2 overs); Jacques Rudolph 142 (230); Oliver Pike 3/82 (19.2 overs)		149/5d (72 overs); Jeremy Lawlor 50* (129); David Lloyd 2/21 (10 overs)

Match drawn
Sophia Gardens, Cardiff
Umpires: Jeff Evans and Russell Warren

- Cardiff MCCU won the toss and elected to field.
- Andrew Brewster, Connor Brown, Oliver Pike and Jack Scriven (Cardiff MCCU) all made their first-class debuts.

28–30 March 2017
Scorecard

Surrey	v	Oxford MCCU
335/7d (91 overs); Dominic Sibley 104* (208); Jack McIver 2/60 (25 overs)		172 (60 overs); Malcolm Lake 48 (106); Mark Footitt 4/15 (10 overs)
142/5d (49 overs); Dominic Sibley 60* (96); Alex Wilkinson 3/35 (15 overs)		64/5 (28 overs); David Scott 18 (26); Gareth Batty 2/2 (4 overs)

Match drawn
The Parks, Oxford
Umpires: Nigel Cowley and Chris Watts

- Surrey won the toss and elected to bat.
- Tom Heathfield, Reece Hussain, David Scott, Daniel Wells, Alex Wilkinson (Oxford MCCU) and Ollie Pope (Surrey) all made their first-class debuts.

28–30 March 2017
Scorecard

Leicestershire	v	Loughborough MCCU
194 (57 overs); Ned Eckersley 49 (82); Basil Akram 5/54 (14 overs)		278 (95.4 overs); Hassan Azad 80 (231); Tom Wells 4/46 (11.4 overs)
113/3 (30 overs); Mark Cosgrove 40* (58); Bobby Gamble 2/16 (6 overs)

Match drawn
Grace Road, Leicester
Umpires: James Middlebrook and Steve O'Shaughnessy

- Leicestershire won the toss and elected to bat.
- Gavin Griffiths (Leicestershire), Sam Cook, Sam Evans, Ben Ladd-Gibbon and Adam Tillcock (Loughborough MCCU) all made their first-class debuts.

=== Round 2 ===
2–4 April 2017
Scorecard

Warwickshire	v	Oxford MCCU
285/4d (86 overs); Jonathan Trott 130 (193); Alex Wilkinson 2/89 (17 overs)		215 (67.4 overs); Bruno Broughton 46 (89); Keith Barker 3/44 (14 overs)
241/5d (78 overs); Sam Hain 81 (124); Malcolm Lake 1/33 (14 overs)		62/6 (31 overs); Jack McIver 22 (54); Oliver Hannon-Dalby 3/8 (8 overs)

Match drawn
The Parks, Oxford
Umpires: Nick Cook and Paul Pollard

- Warwickshire won the toss and elected to bat.
- Sukhjit Singh (Warwickshire) made his first-class debut.

2–4 April 2017
Scorecard

Northamptonshire	v	Loughborough MCCU
435/6d (83 overs); Rob Newton 166 (211); Basil Akram 2/106 (15 overs)		553 (144.3 overs); Nitish Kumar 141 (145); Saif Zaib 6/115 (36.3 overs)
185/0d (46 overs); Alex Wakely 104* (124)

Match drawn
County Ground, Northampton
Umpires: Rob Bailey and David Millns

- Loughborough MCCU won the toss and elected to field.
- Max Holden, Miles Richardson and Gareth Wade (Northamptonshire) all made their first-class debuts.

2–4 April 2017
Scorecard

Essex	v	Durham MCCU
333 (85.4 overs); Adam Wheater 102 (130); Xavier Owen 3/55 (17.4 overs)		187 (76.1 overs); Abhiraj Singh 44 (107); Jamie Porter 4/35 (17 overs)
356/5d (74 overs); Nick Browne 113 (124); Darrel Williams 2/82 (15 overs)		124/2 (51 overs); Jason Marshall 41* (90); Matt Dixon 2/22 (8 overs)

Match drawn
County Ground, Chelmsford
Umpires: Neil Bainton and Chris Watts

- Essex won the toss and elected to bat.
- Freddie Simon and Seb Stewart-Taylor (Durham MCCU) both made their first-class debuts.

2–4 April 2017
Scorecard

Hampshire	v	Cardiff MCCU
289 (63.3 overs); Michael Carberry 100 (121); Neil Brand 3/7 (4.3 overs)		98 (36.3 overs); Kamau Leverock 21 (28); Asher Hart 3/17 (6.3 overs)
271/6d (66 overs); James Vince 90 (114); Neil Brand 1/2 (3 overs)		110/2 (56 overs); Neil Brand 44* (102); Sean Ervine 1/10 (9 overs)

Match drawn
Rose Bowl, Southampton
Umpires: Ian Blackwell and Billy Taylor

- Cardiff MCCU won the toss and elected to field.
- David O'Sullivan (Cardiff MCCU) and Asher Hart (Hampshire) both made their first-class debuts.

2–4 April 2017
Scorecard

Lancashire	v	Cambridge MCCU
338/6d (88 overs); Alex Davies 80 (165); Adam Barton 3/75 (24 overs)		62 (43 overs); Nipuna Senaratne 31 (110); James Anderson 5/10 (11 overs)
120/7d (32 overs); Alex Davies 50* (56); Adam Barton 5/31 (12 overs)		56 (37.4 overs); Tim Moses 18 (41); Jordan Clark 3/11 (6 overs)

Lancashire won by 340 runs
FP Fenner's Ground, Cambridge
Umpires: Paul Baldwin and Tim Robinson

- Cambridge MCCU won the toss and elected to field.

2–4 April 2017
Scorecard

Leeds/Bradford MCCU	v	Yorkshire
137 (64.1 overs); Oliver Graham 41 (131); Steven Patterson 3/25 (15 overs)		543/5d (120 overs); Adam Lyth 194 (278); Oliver Graham 2/90 (22 overs)
182 (60.4 overs); William Cook 42 (73); Tim Bresnan 3/12 (8 overs)

Yorkshire won by an innings and 224 runs
Headingley, Leeds
Umpires: Stephen Gale and Steve Garratt

- Yorkshire won the toss and elected to field.
- Daniel Houghton (Leeds/Bradford MCCU) made his first-class debut.

=== Round 3 ===
7–9 April 2017
Scorecard

Middlesex	v	Cambridge MCCU
392 (105 overs); Dawid Malan 116 (145); Sam Rippington 5/91 (28 overs)		123 (39.5 overs); Akil Greenidge 65 (88); Ollie Rayner 2/14 (5 overs)
175/4d (35 overs); Ollie Rayner 91 (90); Callum Guest 1/14 (3 overs)		111 (39 overs); Akil Greenidge 52 (54); Ollie Rayner 4/9 (7 overs)

Middlesex won by 333 runs
FP Fenner's Ground, Cambridge
Umpires: Russell Evans and Russell Warren

- Middlesex won the toss and elected to bat.

7–9 April 2017
Scorecard

Durham	v	Durham MCCU
404/5d (84.2 overs); Jack Burnham 150 (157); Alex McGrath 2/69 (17.2 overs)		152 (58.3 overs); Benedict Graves 38 (62); Graham Onions 4/21 (16 overs)
270/6d (53 overs); Cameron Steel 82 (86); Benedict Graves 3/35 (9 overs)		63 (33.2 overs); Joe Cooke 22 (80); Graham Onions 4/3 (8 overs)

Durham won by 459 runs
Riverside Ground, Chester-le-Street
Umpires: Tom Lungley and Neil Mallender

- Durham won the toss and elected to bat.

7–9 April 2017
Scorecard

Sussex	v	Cardiff MCCU
317/8d (86 overs); Laurie Evans 84 (123); Kamau Leverock 3/57 (16 overs)		141 (50.4 overs); Yuvraj Odedra 44 (67); Jofra Archer 5/35 (14.4 overs)
414 (95.1 overs); Chris Nash 103 (120); Aron Nijjar 3/113 (27 overs)		86/3 (30 overs); Neil Brand 29 (36); Jofra Archer 2/25 (10 overs)

Match drawn
County Cricket Ground, Hove
Umpires: Jeremy Lloyds and Mark Newell

- Sussex won the toss and elected to bat.

7–9 April 2017
Scorecard

Leeds/Bradford MCCU	v	Worcestershire
162 (58.2 overs); Martin Andersson 33 (70); Jack Shantry 3/36 (17 overs)		453/4d (95.5 overs); Joe Clarke 109 (125); Oliver Bocking 2/74 (21 overs)
249 (80.4 overs); Ben Shoare 43 (55); Charles Morris 3/36 (12 overs)

Worcestershire won by an innings and 42 runs
Weetwood Playing Fields, Leeds
Umpires: Peter Hartley and James Middlebrook

- Worcestershire won the toss and elected to field.

7–9 April 2017
Scorecard

Derbyshire	v	Loughborough MCCU
363/8d (79 overs); Gary Wilson 106 (120); Sam Cook 3/51 (18 overs)		388 (111.4 overs); James Bracey 104 (183); Luis Reece 3/22 (10.4 overs)
255/2d (58 overs); Wayne Madsen 80* (71); Adam Tillcock 2/65 (10 overs)

Match drawn
County Cricket Ground, Derby
Umpires: Jeff Evans and Graham Lloyd

- Loughborough MCCU won the toss and elected to field.

7–9 April 2017
Scorecard

Somerset	v	Oxford MCCU
452/8d (73.4 overs); Roelof van der Merwe 209 (166); Steven Green 3/79 (14 overs)		72 (26.2 overs); Reece Hussain 20 (28); Craig Overton 3/18 (9 overs)
277/6d (53.2 overs); Peter Trego 161 (139); Jack Grundy 2/35 (7 overs)		151 (30.5 overs); Malcolm Lake 65 (37); Craig Overton 3/14 (5.5 overs)

Somerset won by 506 runs
County Ground, Taunton
Umpires: Ian Blackwell and Alex Wharf

- Somerset won the toss and elected to bat.
