= Cornall =

Cornall is a surname. Notable people with the surname include:

- Jan Cornall (born 1950), Australian singer, comedian and writer
- Ralph Cornall (1894–1984), Australian rules footballer
- Robert Cornall, Australian public servant
- Taylor Cornall (born 1998), English cricketer

== See also ==
- Cornally
