= Reece Hussain =

English cricketer (born 1995)

Personal information
- Born: 8 December 1995 (age 30); Havering, Essex
- Relatives: Mel Hussain (father); Nasser Hussain (uncle); Jawad Hussain (grandfather)
- Source: Cricinfo, 29 March 2017

Reece Hussain (born 8 December 1995) is an English cricketer. He made his first-class debut on 28 March 2017 for Oxford MCCU against Surrey as part of the Marylebone Cricket Club University fixtures. He was educated at Felsted School and Oxford Brookes University.
