= Josh Hayes =

Josh Hayes may refer to:

- Josh Hayes (motorcyclist) (born 1975), American motorcycle racer
- Josh Hayes (American football) (born 1999), American football player

== See also ==
- Josh Haynes (born 1977), American MMA fighter
- Josh Haynes (cricketer) (born 1999), English cricketer
