= Bhabra (disambiguation) =

Bhabra is an ancient merchant community from Punjab whose population mainly follows Jainism.

Bhabra may also refer to:

- Ben Bhabra (born 1996), English cricketer
- H. S. Bhabra (1955–2000), British Asian writer and broadcaster who settled in Canada
- Sangeeta Bhabra, co-presenter of Meridian Tonight

== See also ==
- Bhabrasur
- Bhabha (disambiguation)
