= Jason Marshall =

Jason Marshall may refer to:

- Jason Marshall (ice hockey) (born 1971), Canadian retired ice hockey defenceman
- Jason Marshall (rugby union) (born 1989), Canadian rugby union player
- Jason Marshall (baseball), American college baseball coach
- Jason Marshall (cricketer), English cricketer
- Jason Marshall (tennis) (born 1978), American tennis player
- Jason Marshall Jr. (born 2002), American football player
