= Seb (given name) =

Seb is a masculine given name, often a shortened form (hypocorism) of Sebastian. It may refer to:

== People ==
- Seb Brown (born 1989), English football goalkeeper
- Sebastian Coe (born 1956), British politician and former middle-distance runner
- Seb Dance (born 1981), British politician
- Seb Feszczur-Hatchett (born 1995), English cricketer
- Seb Gotch (born 1993), Australian cricketer
- Seb Hines (born 1988), English footballer
- Sebastian Larsson (born 1985), Swedish footballer
- Seb Rochford, Scottish drummer and bandleader
- Sebastian Rodger (born 1991), British hurdler and former decathlete
- Seb Sanders (born 1971), English flat race jockey
- Seb Stegmann (born 1989), English rugby union player
- Seb Stewart-Taylor (born 1995), English cricketer
- Seb Tape (born 1992), former Australian rules footballer
- Sebastian Vettel (born 1987), German racing driver, four-time Formula One world champion

== Fictional characters ==
- Seb Crossley, in the British television series The Evermoor Chronicles
- Seb Miller, in the Australian soap opera Home and Away

== See also ==
- Geb, whose name was originally read as Seb
