= Vansh Bajaj =

Indian cricketer (born 1996)

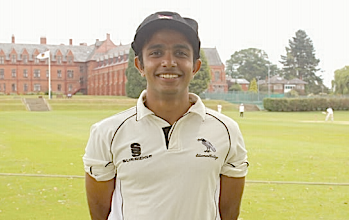

Personal information
- Born: 15 October 1996 (age 30); New Delhi, India
- Batting: Right-handed
- Bowling: Right arm off-spinner

Domestic team information
- Years: Team
- 2016 - 2021: Cambridge University MCCU, Cambridge University Cricket Club
- Source: Cricinfo, 26 March 2019

Vansh Bajaj (born 15 October 1996) is an Indian cricketer. In 2014, whilst studying at Ellesmere College, in Shropshire, he earned a place at one of the six Marylebone Cricket Club University teams in England. In 2016, he received the Marylebone Cricket Club (MCC) Spirit of Cricket Award, which was presented to him at Lord's. He made his first-class debut on 26 March 2019, for Cambridge MCCU against Essex, as part of the Marylebone Cricket Club University fixtures.
