= Harry Bush =

Harry Bush may refer to:

- Harry Bush (artist) (1925–1994), American erotic artist
- Harry Bush (English cricketer) (1871–1942), English first-class cricketer
- Harry Bush (American cricketer) (born 1989), American first-class cricketer
