= Seb =

Seb or SEB may refer to:

== Given name ==
- Seb (given name), a list of people and fictional characters, short for Sebastian
- Geb, a god in Egyptian mythology also known as Seb or Keb

== Organizations ==
- Groupe SEB (Société d'Emboutissage de Bourgogne), a French consortium that produces small appliances
- Scottish Examination Board, a former academic examination board for Scottish schools
- SEB Group, a Swedish banking group
  - SEB bankas, a Lithuanian subsidiary
  - SEB Pank, an Estonian subsidiary
  - SEB banka, a Latvian subsidiary
  - Stockholms Enskilda Bank, a Swedish bank which became part of SEB Group in 1972
- Society for Experimental Biology
- Society for Ethnobotany (formerly Society for Economic Botany)
- Southern Electricity Board, a component of the British Electricity Authority
- Southern European Broadcasting, a division of the American Forces Network
- Special Enforcement Bureau of the Los Angeles County Sheriff's Department, Special Operations Division (the LASD's equivalent of a SWAT team)
- State Electricity Board (disambiguation), India
- The "Student Entertainment Board" of Washington State University

== Science ==
- Single-event induced burnout, a type of radiation damage
- South Equatorial Belt, a belt of atmosphere of Jupiter
- Staphylococcal Enterotoxin B

== Transportation ==
- Sabha Airport, Sabha, Libya, station code SEB
- Seaburn, railway station, England, station code SEB
- Son Nagar railway station, Bihar, India, station code SEB
- Spiez-Erlenbach-Bahn, a railway line in Switzerland

== Other uses ==
- Super Eurobeat, or SEB, a Japanese series of music CDs
- Spencer Engineering Building, University of Western Ontario, Canada
- Sociedade Esportiva de Búzios, Brazilian football club
