= Jack Gibbs =

Jack Gibbs may refer to:

- Jack Gibbs (basketball) (born 1995), American basketball player
- Jack Gibbs (cricketer) (born 2000), English cricketer
- Jack Gibbs (sociologist) (1927–2020), American sociologist
