= Alexander MacQueen =

Alexander (or Alex) MacQueen, Macqueen, or McQueen may refer to:

- Alexander McQueen (1969–2010), British fashion designer and couturier
- Alexander McQueen (fashion house), founded by the couturier
- Alex Macqueen (born 1973), English actor
- Alexander MacQueen (cricketer) (born 1993), English cricketer
- Alexander McQueen (footballer) (born 1995), Grenadan footballer
