= Mel Hussain =

English cricketer (born 1963)

Personal information
- Full name: Mehriyar Hussain
- Born: 17 October 1963 (age 63); South Shields, County Durham, England
- Batting: Right-handed
- Bowling: Right-arm off break
- Relatives: Jawad Hussain (father); Abbas Hussain (brother); Nasser Hussain (brother); Benazir Hussain (sister); Reece Hussain (son)

Domestic team information
- Years: Team
- 1985: Worcestershire
- 2001: Essex Cricket Board

Career statistics
Competition	First-class	List A
Matches	1	1
Runs scored	4	12
Batting average	4.00	12.00
100s/50s	0/0	0/0
Top score	4	12
Balls bowled	–	18
Wickets	–	0
Bowling average	–	–
5 wickets in innings	–	–
10 wickets in match	–	–
Best bowling	–	–
Catches/stumpings	0/–	0/–
- Source: ESPNcricinfo, 15 June 2019

Mehriyar "Mel" Hussain (born 17 October 1963) is an English former cricketer who played one first-class cricket match for Worcestershire County Cricket Club in 1985. He also played one List A match for Essex Cricket Board 16 years later in 2001.

At a lower level, he played for Hampshire's Second XI and, briefly, Warwickshire's and Worcestershire's seconds. In 1982 he played for a MCC side against Ireland, and between 1991 and 1994 appeared a number of times for an England Amateur XI against other home nations, the matches in the last two of those years forming part of the Triple Crown Tournament. He played club cricket with Ilford, Fives, Gidea Park and Romford in the Essex Premier League and at a lower level for High Roding in the Mid-Essex League. Also for Bishop Stortford. A top order batsman and off spinner who rarely gives his wicket away.

In February 2020, he was named in England's squad for the Over-50s Cricket World Cup in South Africa. However, the tournament was cancelled during the third round of matches due to the COVID-19 pandemic.

Hussain's younger brother, Nasser Hussain, captained England and Essex, while his father Jawad Hussain played once for Tamil Nadu in 1964/65 and another brother, Abbas Hussain, reached Second XI level with Essex. His son, Reece, played first-class cricket for Oxford MCCU in 2017.
