= Adam Barton =

Adam Barton may refer to:

- Adam Barton (footballer) (born 1991), English football player
- Adam Barton (cricketer) (born 1995), English cricketer
- Adam Barton (Emmerdale), fictional character in a British television soap opera
