= Douglas Pratt =

Douglas Pratt may refer to:

- Harold Douglas Pratt Jr. or H. Douglas Pratt, American ornithologist
- Douglas Pratt (cricketer), English cricketer
- Douglas Henry Pratt, British Army officer
