= Christian Davis =

English cricketer (born 1992)

Personal information
- Full name: Christian Arthur Linghorne Davis
- Born: 11 October 1992 (age 34); Milton Keynes, Buckinghamshire, England
- Batting: Right-handed
- Bowling: Left-arm fast-medium
- Role: All-rounder

Domestic team information
- Years: Team
- 2010–2013: Northamptonshire
- 2014–2016: Leeds/Bradford MCCU
- 2016: Sussex

Career statistics
Competition	First-class	List A
Matches	6	5
Runs scored	1	60
Batting average	0.17	20.00
100s/50s	0/0	0/1
Top score	1	54
Balls bowled	30	63
Wickets	0	1
Bowling average	–	69.00
5 wickets in innings	–	0
10 wickets in match	–	0
Best bowling	–	1/25
Catches/stumpings	2/–	0/–
- Source: CricketArchive, 10 November 2025

Christian Arthur Linghorne Davis (born 11 October 1992) is an English former cricketer who played for Sussex. He is a right-handed batsman and left arm fast-medium bowler. He made his one day debut for Northamptonshire against Essex, on 8 August 2010. He has since played four first-class matches for Leeds-Bradford MCCU, and played for Sussex in one day and first-class cricket. In July 2016 he scored the record individual score for Sussex 2nd XI, 258* against Glamorgan 2nd XI at Abergavenny
