= Oliver Currill =

English cricketer (born 1997)

Personal information
- Full name: Oliver Charles Currill
- Born: 27 February 1997 (age 29); Banbury, Oxfordshire, England
- Batting: Right-handed
- Bowling: Right-arm medium
- Role: Bowler

Domestic team information
- Years: Team
- 2017–present: Gloucestershire
- Only First-class: 28 March 2017 Gloucestershire v Durham MCCU

Career statistics
Competition	First-class
Matches	1
Runs scored	–
Batting average	–
100s/50s	–/–
Top score	–
Balls bowled	90
Wickets	0
Bowling average	–
5 wickets in innings	–
10 wickets in match	–
Best bowling	–
Catches/stumpings	0/–
- Source: ESPNcricinfo, 3 April 2017

Oliver Charles Currill (born 27 February 1997) is an English cricketer. He made his first-class debut on 28 March 2017 for Gloucestershire against Durham MCCU as part of the Marylebone Cricket Club University fixtures.
