= Luke Chapman (cricketer) =

English cricketer (born 1998)

Personal information
- Full name: Luke Chapman
- Born: 21 August 1998 (age 28)
- Source: Cricinfo, 29 March 2017

Luke Chapman (born 21 August 1998) is an English cricketer. He made his first-class debut on 28 March 2017 for Cambridge MCCU against Nottinghamshire as part of the Marylebone Cricket Club University fixtures.
