= Chris Wakefield =

English cricketer

Personal information
- Full name: Christopher Francis Wakefield
- Born: 11 October 1991 (age 35); Hammersmith, London, England
- Batting: Right-handed
- Role: Wicket-keeper

Domestic team information
- Years: Team
- 2015: Leeds/Bradford MCCU

Career statistics
Competition	First-class
Matches	2
Runs scored	7
Batting average	3.50
100s/50s	–/–
Top score	7
Catches/stumpings	4/–
- Source: Cricinfo, 7 August 2020

Christopher Francis Wakefield (born 11 October 1991) is an English former first-class cricketer.

Wakefield was born at Hammersmith in October 1991. He was educated at Wellington College and St Benedict's School, before going up to Leeds Metropolitan University. While studying at Leeds, he played two first-class cricket matches for Leeds/Bradford MCCU against Sussex and Yorkshire in 2015. Playing as a wicket-keeper, he scored 7 runs in his two matches and took 4 catches.
