= Daniel Houghton (cricketer) =

English cricketer (born 1998)

Personal information
- Full name: Daniel Houghton
- Born: 5 July 1998 (age 28); Ormskirk, Lancashire

Domestic team information
- Years: Team
- 2015–present: Leeds/Bradford MCCU
- First-class debut: 2 April 2017 Leeds/Bradford MCCU v Yorkshire

Career statistics
Competition	FC
Matches	1
Runs scored	35
Batting average	35.00
100s/50s	0/0
Top score	29
Balls bowled	150
Wickets	0
Bowling average	–
5 wickets in innings	–
10 wickets in match	–
Best bowling	–
Catches/stumpings	0/–
- Source: Cricinfo, 4 April 2017

Daniel Houghton (born 5 July 1998) is an English cricketer. He made his first-class debut on 2 April 2017 for Leeds/Bradford MCCU against Yorkshire as part of the Marylebone Cricket Club University fixtures.
