= Chris Harwood =

American cricketer

Personal information
- Full name: Christopher S Harwood
- Born: 1 October 1994 (age 32); Weymouth, Massachusetts

Domestic team information
- Years: Team
- 2016: Leeds/Bradford MCCU
- First-class debut: 5 April 2016 Leeds/Bradford MCCU v Sussex

Career statistics
Competition	FC
Matches	1
Runs scored	–
Batting average	–
100s/50s	–
Top score	–
Balls bowled	108
Wickets	1
Bowling average	103.00
5 wickets in innings	–
10 wickets in match	–
Best bowling	1/103
Catches/stumpings	1/–
- Source: Cricinfo, 7 April 2016

Chris Harwood (born 1 October 1994) is an American-born cricketer. He made his first-class debut for Leeds/Bradford MCCU against Sussex on 5 April 2016.
