= Ashley Gowers =

English cricketer (born 1994)

Personal information
- Born: 12 December 1994 (age 31); Bury, Lancashire
- Batting: Right-handed
- Bowling: Right-arm medium-fast
- Role: Wicket-keeper

Domestic team information
- Years: Team
- 2016: Leeds/Bradford MCCU
- FC debut: 31 March 2016 Leeds/Bradford MCCU v Warwickshire

Career statistics
Competition	First-class
Matches	2
Runs scored	38
Batting average	38.00
100s/50s	0/0
Top score	38
Catches/stumpings	1/2
- Source: Cricinfo, 7 April 2016

Ashley Gowers (born 12 December 1994) is an English cricketer. He is a right-handed wicket-keeper-batsman. He made his first-class debut for Leeds/Bradford MCCU against Warwickshire on 31 March 2016. Prior to his first-class debut, Gowers played local cricket in the Lancashire League.
