= Saad Ashraf =

English cricketer (born 1997)

Personal information
- Born: 25 September 1997 (age 29); Nottingham, England
- Source: Cricinfo, 26 March 2019

Saad Ashraf (born 25 September 1997) is an English cricketer. In 2017, he was named the Young Player of the Year in the Nottinghamshire Premier League. He made his first-class debut on 26 March 2019, for Leeds/Bradford MCCU against Derbyshire, as part of the Marylebone Cricket Club University fixtures.
