= Jack Potticary =

English cricketer (born 1996)

Personal information
- Born: 16 November 1996 (age 29); Harold Wood, Greater London
- Batting: Right-handed
- Role: Wicket-keeper

Domestic team information
- Years: Team
- 2017: Leeds/Bradford MCCU
- First-class debut: 28 March 2017 Leeds/Bradford MCCU v Kent

Career statistics
Competition	FC
Matches	2
Runs scored	72
Batting average	18.00
100s/50s	0/0
Top score	32
Balls bowled	–
Wickets	–
Bowling average	–
5 wickets in innings	–
10 wickets in match	–
Best bowling	–
Catches/stumpings	–/–
- Source: Cricinfo, 4 April 2017

Jack Potticary (born 16 November 1996) is an English cricketer. He made his first-class debut on 28 March 2017 for Leeds/Bradford MCCU against Kent as part of the Marylebone Cricket Club University fixtures.
