= Oliver Graham =

English cricketer (born 1995)

Personal information
- Born: 3 January 1995 (age 31); Haywards Heath, West Sussex
- Batting: Right-handed
- Bowling: Right-arm slow

Domestic team information
- Years: Team
- 2017: Leeds/Bradford MCCU
- First-class debut: 28 March 2017 Leeds/Bradford MCCU v Kent

Career statistics
| Competition | FC |
|---|---|
| Matches | 1 |
| Runs scored | 14 |
| Batting average | 7.00 |
| 100s/50s | 0/0 |
| Top score | 10 |
| Balls bowled | 186 |
| Wickets | 2 |
| Bowling average | 49.00 |
| 5 wickets in innings | – |
| 10 wickets in match | – |
| Best bowling | 2/60 |
| Catches/stumpings | 1/– |
- Source: Cricinfo, 30 March 2017

Oliver Graham (born 3 January 1995) is an English cricketer. He made his first-class debut on 28 March 2017 for Leeds/Bradford MCCU against Kent as part of the Marylebone Cricket Club University fixtures.
