= Oliver Bocking =

English cricketer (born 1996)

Personal information
- Born: 25 April 1996 (age 30); Colchester, Essex
- Batting: Right-handed
- Bowling: Right-arm fast-medium

Domestic team information
- Years: Team
- 2017: Leeds/Bradford MCCU
- First-class debut: 28 March 2017 Leeds/Bradford MCCU v Kent

Career statistics
| Competition | FC |
|---|---|
| Matches | 2 |
| Runs scored | 1 |
| Batting average | 0.33 |
| 100s/50s | 0/0 |
| Top score | 1* |
| Balls bowled | 348 |
| Wickets | 7 |
| Bowling average | 31.85 |
| 5 wickets in innings | – |
| 10 wickets in match | – |
| Best bowling | 4/52 |
| Catches/stumpings | 0/– |
- Source: Cricinfo, 4 April 2017

Oliver Bocking (born 25 April 1996) is an English cricketer. He made his first-class debut on 28 March 2017 for Leeds/Bradford MCCU. His first game was against Kent, as part of the Marylebone Cricket Club University fixtures.
