= Nasser Hussain =

English cricketer (born 1968)

Nasser Hussain OBE
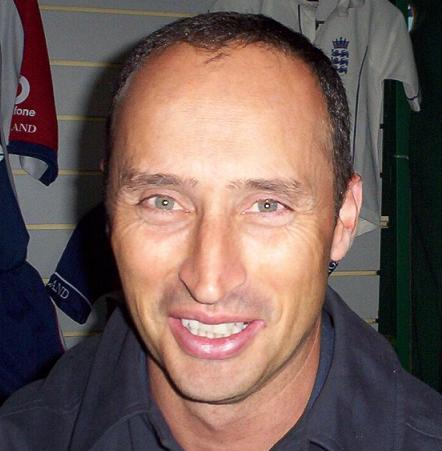
- Hussain in 2005

Personal information
- Full name: Nasser Hussain
- Born: 28 March 1968 (age 58); Madras, India
- Nickname: Nashwan, Nass, Beaky
- Height: 1.83 m (6 ft 0 in)
- Batting: Right-handed
- Bowling: Right-arm leg break
- Role: Top-order batter
- Relatives: Jawad Hussain (father); Mel Hussain (brother); Abbas Hussain (brother); Benazir Hussain (sister); Reece Hussain (nephew)

International information
- National side: England (1989–2004)
- Test debut (cap 542): 24 February 1990 v West Indies
- Last Test: 20 May 2004 v New Zealand
- ODI debut (cap 105): 30 October 1989 v Pakistan
- Last ODI: 2 March 2003 v Australia
- ODI shirt no.: 3

Domestic team information
- Years: Team
- 1987–2004: Essex

Career statistics
Competition	Test	ODI	FC	LA
Matches	96	88	334	364
Runs scored	5,764	2,332	20,698	10,732
Batting average	37.18	30.28	42.06	36.75
100s/50s	14/34	1/16	52/108	10/72
Top score	207	115	207	161*
Balls bowled	30	–	312	–
Wickets	0	–	2	–
Bowling average	–	–	161.50	–
5 wickets in innings	–	–	0	–
10 wickets in match	–	–	0	–
Best bowling	–	–	1/38	–
Catches/stumpings	67/–	40/–	350/–	161/–
- Source: ESPNcricinfo, 15 October 2007

Nasser Hussain OBE (born 28 March 1968) is an English cricket commentator and former player who captained the England cricket team between 1999 and 2003, with his overall international career extending from 1990 to 2004. A pugnacious right-handed batsman, Hussain scored over 30,000 runs from more than 650 matches across all first-class and List-A cricket, including 62 centuries. His highest Test score of 207, scored in the first Test of the 1997 Ashes at Edgbaston, was described by Wisden as "touched by genius". He played 96 Test matches and 88 One Day International games in total. In Tests he scored 5,764 runs, and he took 67 catches, fielding predominantly in the second slip and gully.

Born in Madras, Hussain was led into cricket by his father, and his family moved to England when Hussain was a young child. He joined Essex in 1987 after developing from a spin bowler to batsman while at school and playing for the various Essex youth teams, as the leg-spin of his youth deserted him. He was selected for England initially on the back of 990 runs scored for Essex in the County Championship of 1989, though injury and poor form would limit his international caps during the early 1990s to three Tests of a 1990 West Indies tour, and four further matches in 1993. Only in 1996 did he become a regular England Test cricketer.

Although regarded as somewhat of a firebrand in his youth, Hussain succeeded Alec Stewart as captain in 1999 and led England in forty-five Test matches until resigning in 2003. Overseeing four consecutive Test series victories and England's rise to third in the Test rankings, Hussain is regarded as one of England's most able captains. Simon Barnes of The Times wrote that Hussain was "perhaps the finest captain to hold the office." After resigning the captaincy, Hussain played on in Test cricket until the debut Test of future captain Andrew Strauss – the ability of whom was witnessed by Hussain who scored a century in the same match – and growing calls for him to leave the team, prompted him to yield his position and retire. He joined Sky Sports as a commentator shortly thereafter. His 2005 autobiography Playing With Fire won the Best Autobiography category of the 2005 British Sports Book Awards.

== Early years ==
Hussain was born in Madras, India into a Tamil Muslim family. His father, Raza Jawad 'Joe' Hussain, was a keen cricketer and field hockey player. He was a descendant of Muhammad Ali Khan Wallajah, the Nawab of Arcot State in the second half of the 18th century. Nasser's mother Shireen (originally Patricia Price) is English. As a child, Nasser's first experiences of cricket were family visits to Chepauk, where his older brothers Mehriyar 'Mel' Hussain – who would go on to play briefly for Worcestershire – and Abbas used to bat on the outfield while he chased after the ball. His father moved the family to England in 1975. Hussain recalled in his 2005 autobiography that the family gave up a prosperous life in India – where the family were comfortable – in order to obtain for the children the benefits of the English educational system. The family moved to Ilford, and Hussain later took charge of the indoor cricket school in Ilford where he used to bowl for hours on end at his elder brothers. He was a talented leg-spin bowler, and with his ability starting to show, at just eight years old, Hussain was selected to play for the Essex Under-11s, and at 12 years old, was the youngest to play for Essex Under-15s. He meanwhile continued his education at Forest School, Walthamstow.

At the age of 14 Hussain was selected to play for England Schools where he first came into contact with his friend and future England colleague Mike Atherton. Born five days apart, Hussain and Atherton soon found their careers progressing in parallel as they captained, batted and bowled legspin for England age-group teams. As well as Atherton, who was considered the "Golden Boy" of the North at the time, Hussain played with and against others such as Mark Ramprakash, Graham Thorpe and Trevor Ward. At the age of 15, and captain of England Schools, Hussain "grew a foot in height in the winter" and the trajectory of his bowling was altered. He recounts "I went from bowling out Graham Gooch in the indoor school with everyone watching, to hitting the roof of the net or bowling triple-bouncers to deadly silence."

Hussain's father initially refused to accept that his son could not bowl to the previous high standards and continued to push him into bowling, while Hussain, full of frustration at his sudden loss of ability felt he was letting his father down. Concerns over his father's expectations of him would continue throughout Hussain's career, as he related in his biography after retiring. After the loss of his bowling, Hussain dropped behind his contemporaries; Atherton, Ramprakash and Martin Bicknell all began to receive professional county contracts while Hussain was not being selected for representative games and England tours. Hussain switched to batting while he was still captain of Essex under-16s and moved himself up the order to get more runs and to bowl less. His batting progressed, and in that year he became the first under-16 at Forest to score 1,000 runs in a season since 1901. Hussain himself admitted that batting never came as naturally to him as leg-spin bowling. Throughout his career he batted with little left elbow and plenty of bottom hand, and backed-up with the bat in his right hand.

While continuing with his cricket, he also studied Natural Sciences at the University of Durham – a strong cricketing university – where he belonged to the College of St Hild and St Bede. He graduated in 1989 with a Bachelor of Science (BSc) degree.

== Test cricket ==
Hussain made his Test cricket debut in 1990 against the West Indies with the match ending just before lunch on the final day. England won the test by nine wickets, but lost the series 2–1.

Hussain was subsequently not picked for the next three years. He was regarded as a bit of a "hot-head", and his fiery temper briefly jeopardised his prospects of an international career. At Essex, Hussain continued to score runs and impressed his county colleague and England captain Graham Gooch enough to have a Test reprieve. He was thus selected for the 3rd Ashes Test of 1993, in which he scored 71 and 47 not out, ensuring his selection for the rest of the series. It was enough to secure his place for the subsequent winter tour of the West Indies. Before the Test series, Hussain participated in a warm-up match against St Kitts and Nevis, in which he was dismissed for a duck by John "The Dentist" Maynard, and subsequently, again was not picked for the next three years of Test matches.

Hussain was picked again for a Test series against India in the summer of 1996. The number 3 batting position had been troublesome for England for some time. England had tried all manner of combinations at No. 3, from the left-field Jason Gallian to the veteran Robin Smith, via the temperamentally suspect pairing of Graeme Hick and Mark Ramprakash. "A lot is made of your batting position," Hussain recalled to ESPNcricinfo, "but I always felt, and I did back then when David Lloyd rang me up and asked me to bat No. 3, that if you're good enough to be playing Test cricket, you should be good enough to move from No. 5 to No. 3". Hussain scored 128 in the first innings. Hussain was awarded Man of The Match and with another century in the last Test that summer was awarded Man of the Series.

=== Test captain ===
Hussain was the captain of the England team for 45 Test matches from 1999 to 2003; as of 2021 the sixth most for an England captain, with his 17 Test victories the seventh most as England captain. His percentage of Tests won was higher than any of the previous eight captains since Bob Willis retired in 1984.

Hussain became Test captain in July 1999, taking over from Alec Stewart for the series against New Zealand at home, after which he was booed by the England fans as he and his team stood on the pavilion balcony. In 2000 he led England to a 3–1 victory over the West Indies at home, and in that winter, the England team beat both Pakistan and Sri Lanka away. Under Hussain, England won four Test series in a row and rose to third place in the ICC Test Championship table when it was launched, after being ninth and last in the prototype Wisden World Championship in September 1999.

Hussain was captain of both the Test and One Day International England teams until after the 2003 Cricket World Cup, when England failed to make the second round after boycotting their match against Zimbabwe in Harare, citing security concerns. But as he stated in his autobiography Playing With Fire, the whole Zimbabwe question and the responsibility of whether or not to play against Zimbabwe was left to the captain and it was a question that "kept him awake at night".

Hussain's captaincy was also associated with a more assertive approach to England's Test cricket, with his leadership and partnership with coach Duncan Fletcher contributing to a period in which the team became more competitive after a prolonged period of poor results.

Immediately after the 2003 Cricket World Cup, he stepped down as one-day captain, being replaced by Michael Vaughan. Later in 2003, Hussain announced his retirement as Test captain after England's Test series against South Africa, again being replaced by Vaughan.

Hussain continued as a batsman in the Test team until May 2004; in his final Test, against New Zealand at Lord's, he scored 34 and 103 not out, hitting the winning runs.

Sachin Tendulkar wrote in his autobiography Playing It My Way: My Autobiography that

Among the Captains I have played against, I consider Nasser Hussein the best. He was an excellent strategist ... He was a very good thinker about the game and was proactive. Nasser would not place a fielder in a particular position after a shot was played. Rather, he had the ability to anticipate the shot and would place a fielder well in advance, making a real difference to his team.

Hussain has the record of the most consecutive Test tosses lost as captain, losing 10 in a row between November 2000 and December 2001.

== One Day Internationals ==
Hussain's highest ODI score of 115 occurred against India in the final of the 2002 NatWest Series, during a game that was described by BBC correspondent Jonathan Agnew as "the most exciting one-day international I have ever seen." For some time before the game, Hussain's insistence on batting at number three and even his inclusion in the team had been repeatedly questioned by several members of the press, most notably Sky Sports commentators (and Hussain's future colleagues) Ian Botham and Bob Willis. His innings included a partnership of 185 with Marcus Trescothick (who scored 109 himself). After reaching his century Hussain courted controversy by gesturing wildly, pointing to the number 3 on his back and raising three fingers to the media box. India were set a target of 326 to win and completed the chase with three balls to spare.

== Post-playing career ==
Within hours of Hussain announcing his retirement from cricket, it was confirmed that he would join the Sky Sports commentary team on a full-time basis alongside other former England captains Bob Willis, David Gower and Ian Botham and his former England coach David Lloyd. "We now have the most experienced line-up ever seen in a commentary box", said Vic Wakeling of Sky. "Four former England captains with over 400 Tests, 20,000 runs, and 700 wickets between them – and each is a former Wisden Cricketer of the Year." In August 2011, in a match between India and England, comments made by Hussain against the Indian team created a stir among some cricket fans: "I would say the difference between the two is the fielding. England are all-round a good fielding side. I do believe that India have few... 3 or 4 very good fielders and one or two donkeys in the field still."

In 2004, Hussain released his autobiography, Playing with Fire. It won the Best Autobiography category of the 2005 British Sports Book Awards.

In 2005 He was awarded Honorary Life Membership of the Marylebone Cricket Club.

Since 2010 he has coached at New Hall School, an independent school in Essex.

He played himself in the 2011 Bollywood film Patiala House, in which Akshay Kumar played the leading role.

He is one of Sky Cricket's leading commentators alongside Michael Atherton, Ian Ward and Stuart Broad.

== Personal life ==
Hussain has been married to Karen since 1993. They have two sons, Joel and Jacob, and a daughter, Layla, all three of whom play for Hutton Cricket Club in Hussain's home county of Essex. The club was featured in a short documentary surrounding the development of women's grassroots cricket.

His brother Mehriyar also played first-class cricket.

== Honours ==
- He was made an Officer of the Order of the British Empire (OBE) in the Civil Division "For services to Cricket" in the 2002 New Years Honours List.
- He was awarded Honorary Life Membership of the Marylebone Cricket Club in 2005.

Sporting positions
Preceded by Paul Prichard	Essex County Captain; 1999	Succeeded by Ronnie Irani
Preceded by Alec Stewart	English national cricket captain 1999–2003	Succeeded by Michael Vaughan
