= Peter McDermott (cricketer) =

English cricketer (born 1996)

Personal information
- Full name: Peter McDermott
- Born: 27 January 1996 (age 30)

Domestic team information
- Years: Team
- 2017: Leeds/Bradford MCCU
- First-class debut: 28 March 2017 Leeds/Bradford MCCU v Kent

Career statistics
Competition	FC
Matches	2
Runs scored	46
Batting average	11.50
100s/50s	0/0
Top score	20
Balls bowled	–
Wickets	–
Bowling average	–
5 wickets in innings	–
10 wickets in match	–
Best bowling	–
Catches/stumpings	0/–
- Source: Cricinfo, 4 April 2017

Peter McDermott (born 27 January 1996) is an English cricketer. He made his first-class debut on 28 March 2017 for Leeds/Bradford MCCU against Kent as part of the Marylebone Cricket Club University fixtures.
