= Tim Moses =

English cricketer (born 1994)

Personal information
- Born: 1 December 1994 (age 31); Lewes, Sussex
- Source: Cricinfo, 29 March 2017

Tim Moses (born 1 December 1994) is an English cricketer. He made his first-class debut on 28 March 2017 for Cambridge MCCU against Nottinghamshire as part of the Marylebone Cricket Club University fixtures.
