= Josh Cantrell (cricketer) =

English cricketer (born 1999)

Personal information
- Full name: Josh James Cantrell
- Born: 18 February 1999 (age 27)
- Source: Cricinfo, 26 March 2019

Josh Cantrell (born 18 February 1999) is an English cricketer. He made his first-class debut on 26 March 2019, for Cambridge MCCU against Essex, as part of the Marylebone Cricket Club University fixtures.
