= Tom Hardman =

English cricketer (1990–2012)

Personal information
- Full name: Thomas Richard Hardman
- Born: 3 December 1990; Bury, England
- Died: 28 November 2012 (aged 21); Leeds, England
- Nickname: Hardy, Tommy ten bags
- Batting: Right-handed
- Bowling: Right-arm medium-fast

Domestic team information
- Years: Team
- 2012: Leeds/Bradford MCCU

Career statistics
Competition	First-class
Matches	2
Runs scored	65
Batting average	16.25
100s/50s	–/–
Top score	44
Balls bowled	216
Wickets	3
Bowling average	59.66
5 wickets in innings	–
10 wickets in match	–
Best bowling	2/51
Catches/stumpings	1/–
- Source: Cricinfo, 12 December 2012

Thomas Richard Hardman (3 December 1990 – 28 November 2012) was an English cricketer. Hardman was a right-handed batsman who bowled right-arm medium-fast. He was born in Bury, Greater Manchester and was educated at St Joseph's RC High School, Heywood and Holy Cross College, Bury.

Following a back injury which required him to be placed in a brace for three months in 2010, he began playing Second XI cricket for the Lancashire Second XI. While studying Sports and Exercise Sciences at Leeds Metropolitan University, Hardman made two first-class appearances for Leeds/Bradford MCCU in 2012 against Surrey at The Oval and Yorkshire at Headingley. He scored a total of 65 runs in his two matches, with a high score of 44 against Yorkshire. With the ball, he took 3 wickets at an average of 59.66, with best figures of 2/51. He also played a number of Second XI matches for Leeds/Bradford MCCU during the 2012 season.

Hardman was found dead in his house in Leeds, Yorkshire, on 28 November 2012. He had earlier been named as the Leeds/Bradford MCCU captain for the 2013 season.
