= St Leonard's Catholic School, Durham =

St Leonard's Catholic school

Location
- DH1 4NG; County Durham, DH1 4NG; England; 54.785°N 1.585°W

Information
- Type: Academy
- Religious affiliation: Roman Catholic
- Established: 1936
- Local authority: Durham County Council
- Trust: Bishop Wilkinson Catholic Education Trust
- Department for Education URN: 143583 Tables
- Ofsted: Reports
- Headteacher: David Simmons
- Gender: Coeducational
- Age: 11 to 18
- Enrolment: 1265
- Website: Official website

St Leonard's Catholic School is a coeducational Roman Catholic secondary school and sixth form. It is in Durham, County Durham, England.

== History ==
The school takes its name from St Leonard as in medieval times there was a chapel and hospital dedicated to St Leonard in this part of Durham.

The school was opened in 1936 in a former coalmine-owner's house 'Mount Beulah', latterly known as Springwell Hall.

The school was established as St Leonard's Catholic Central School in Springwell Hall, which had been acquired in 1935 by the Roman Catholic Diocese of Hexham and Newcastle.

During the era of the tripartite system, the school became a secondary modern and turned comprehensive in 1970 when the system was abolished by the LEA. The sixth form was opened that same year.

Previously a voluntary aided school administered by Durham County Council, in November 2016 St Leonard's Catholic School converted to academy status. The school is now a part of the Bishop Wilkinson Catholic Education Trust.

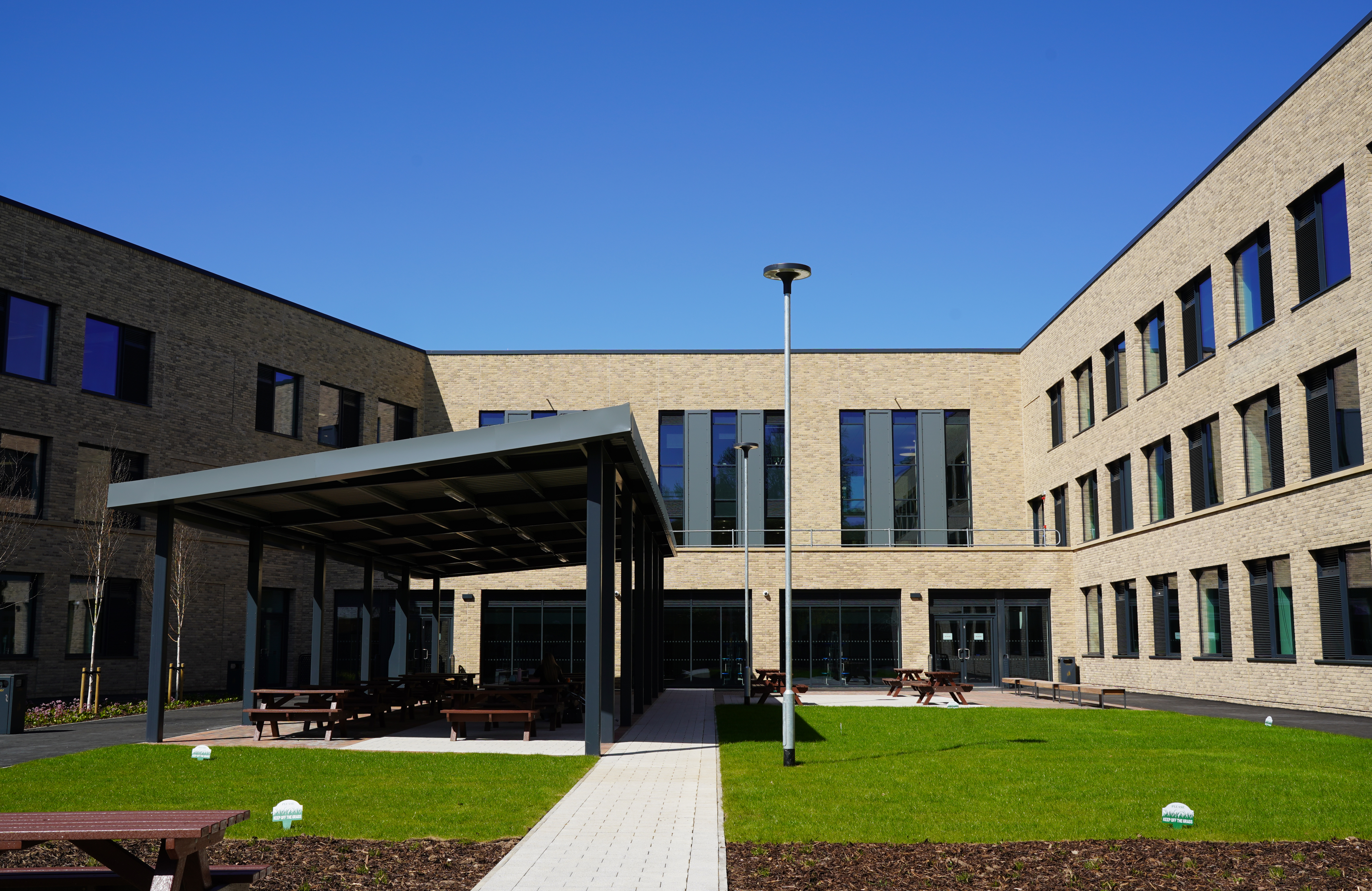
The school's garden

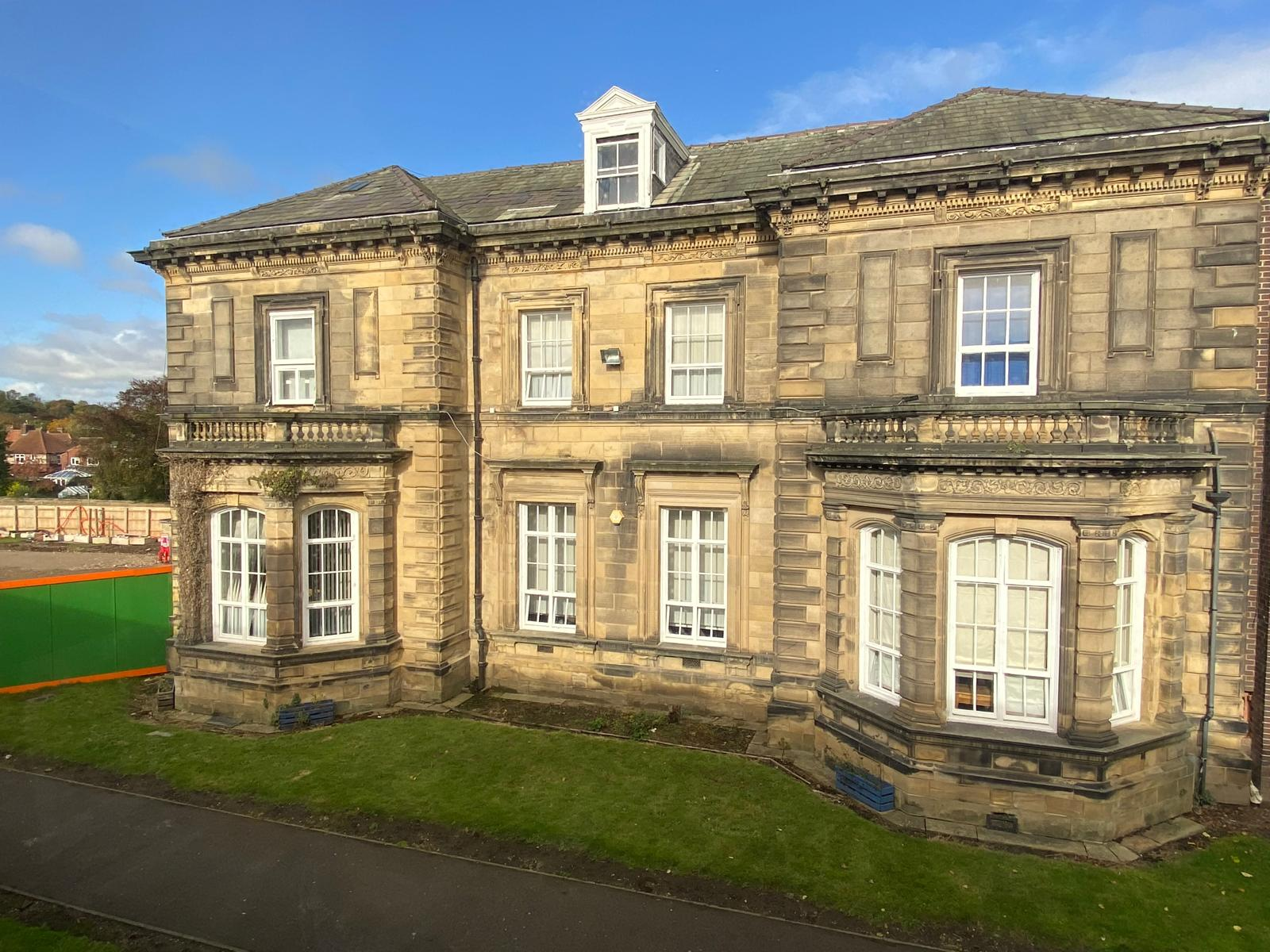
Springwell Hall housed St Leonard's where the school started in 1936

== Sunday Times Award - 2026 School of the Year ==
In December 2025 the school was awarded all three Sunday Times Parent Power Awards for the Northeast, these being: School of the Year, Comprehensive School of the Year and School of the Year for Academic Excellence.

== New Building ==
In April 2026 the school moved into a new building, part of a £71 million new building project.

== Ofsted judgements ==
The school was judged Outstanding in all 5 areas of the Ofsted Framework in 2024. Previously the school had been judged Good by Ofsted in 2019.

== Headteachers ==
William Kavanagh 1970-1988

Sean O’Keeffe 1988-2006

Simon Campbell 2006-2019

Chris Hammill 2019-2026

David Simmons 2026-Present

== Sport ==
The school has a rowing club, the St Leonard's School Boat Club.

== Notable former pupils ==
- Stephen Cantwell (born 1996), cricketer
- Elliot Embleton, footballer
- Paddy and Martin McAloon, founders of the pop group Prefab Sprout
- Jessica Eddie, Olympic medal-winning rower
