= David Scott (cricketer) =

English cricketer (born 1998)

Personal information
- Full name: David Neil Cullinan Scott
- Born: 27 July 1998 (age 28)
- Source: Cricinfo, 29 March 2017

David Scott (born 27 July 1998) is an English cricketer. He made his first-class debut on 28 March 2017 for Oxford MCCU against Surrey as part of the Marylebone Cricket Club University fixtures. He played county cricket for Dorset (2022–2024). He was in the NCCA team that won the 2023 European Cricket Championship.
