= Jawad Hussain =

Indian cricketer (1939–2008)

Joe Hussain
- Born: 20 April 1939; Madras, Madras Presidency, British India
- Died: 26 April 2008 (aged 69); Romford, Greater London, England
- Children: Nasser Hussain, Mel Hussain, Benazir Hussain, Abbas Hussain

Raza Jawad Hussain (20 April 1939 – 26 April 2008), commonly known as Joe Hussain, was an Indian cricketer. He played only one first-class match, for Tamil Nadu against Andhra in the 1964–65 Ranji Trophy. He scored 17 in his only innings, bowled one over for three runs, and did not hold a catch.

== Education ==
He is an alumnus of Loyola College, Chennai.

Hussain owned a cricket school in Ilford which was started by coach Harold Faragher, where players such as Graham Gooch and former England cricketer John Lever once trained. He died on 26 April 2008 at the age of 69 due to heart and lung failure caused by pneumonia.

== Personal life ==
He married an English woman and was the father of former England Test captain Nasser Hussain, former Worcestershire player Mel Hussain and the ballerina Benazir Hussain.
