= Matthew Jahanfar =

English cricketer

Personal information
- Full name: Matthew Jahanfar
- Source: Cricinfo, 29 March 2017

Matthew Jahanfar is an English cricketer. He made his first-class debut on 28 March 2017 for Durham MCCU against Gloucestershire as part of the Marylebone Cricket Club University fixtures.
