= George Scott (cricketer) =

English cricketer (born 1995)

Personal information
- Full name: George Frederick Buchan Scott
- Born: 6 November 1995 (age 31); Hemel Hempstead, Hertfordshire, England
- Batting: Right-handed
- Bowling: Right-arm fast-medium
- Role: All-rounder
- Relatives: Charlie Scott (brother)

Domestic team information
- Years: Team
- 2015–2019: Middlesex (squad no. 17)
- 2015–2016: Leeds/Bradford MCCU
- 2020–2022: Gloucestershire (squad no. 17)
- 2022: → Somerset (on loan)
- First-class debut: 2 April 2015 Leeds/Bradford MCCU v Sussex
- List A debut: 6 August 2015 Middlesex v Notts

Career statistics
Competition	FC	LA	T20
Matches	25	21	36
Runs scored	604	462	371
Batting average	17.76	38.50	20.61
100s/50s	0/2	0/3	0/0
Top score	77	66*	38*
Balls bowled	1,104	318	74
Wickets	10	1	3
Bowling average	62.20	352.00	41.33
5 wickets in innings	0	0	0
10 wickets in match	0	0	0
Best bowling	2/34	1/65	1/14
Catches/stumpings	10/–	11/–	17/–
- Source: CricketArchive, 23 August 2022

George Frederick Buchan Scott (born 6 November 1995) is an English cricketer who most recently played for Gloucestershire County Cricket Club. An all-rounder, who is a right-handed batsman, and bowls right-arm medium pace. After a schoolboy career at St Albans Boys School, Scott made his first-class debut for Leeds Bradford MCCU against Sussex County Cricket Club in April 2015.

At the end of the 2019 season, Scott turned down the offer of a new contract at Middlesex to join Gloucestershire on a three-year deal. He left Gloucestershire at the end of the 2022 season.

His brother, Charlie, has also played first-class cricket.
