= Oliver Batchelor =

English cricketer (born 1996)

Personal information
- Born: 2 October 1996 (age 30)
- Source: Cricinfo, 26 March 2019

Oliver Batchelor (born 2 October 1996) is an English cricketer. He made his first-class debut on 26 March 2019, for Leeds/Bradford MCCU against Derbyshire, as part of the Marylebone Cricket Club University fixtures.
