= Adam Tillcock =

English cricketer (born 1993)

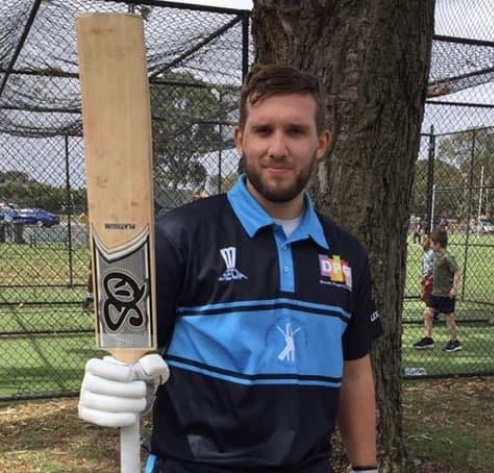

Personal information
- Full name: Adam David Tillcock
- Born: 13 October 1993 (age 33); Nottingham, Nottinghamshire
- Batting: Right-handed
- Bowling: Slow left-arm orthodox

Domestic team information
- Years: Team
- 2013: Nottinghamshire
- 2017–2019: Loughborough MCCU
- FC debut: 28 March 2017 Loughborough MCCU v Leicestershire
- Only LA: 14 August 2013 Nottinghamshire v Bangladesh A

Career statistics
Competition	First-class	List A
Matches	6	1
Runs scored	139	97
Batting average	23.16	–
100s/50s	0/1	0/1
Top score	60	97*
Balls bowled	710	–
Wickets	1	–
Bowling average	401.00	–
5 wickets in innings	0	–
10 wickets in match	0	–
Best bowling	1/53	–
Catches/stumpings	0/–	0/–
- Source: ESPNcricinfo, 17 May 2022

Adam David Tillcock (born 13 October 1993) is an English cricketer who has played for Nottinghamshire County Cricket Club. He made his first-class debut on 28 March 2017 for Loughborough MCCU against Leicestershire as part of the Marylebone Cricket Club University fixtures.
