= Gareth Wade =

English cricketer (born 1991)

Personal information
- Full name: Gareth Wade
- Born: 11 January 1991 (age 35); Hexham, Northumberland, England
- Batting: Right-handed
- Bowling: Right-arm medium-fast
- Role: Bowler

Domestic team information
- Years: Team
- 2014–2016: Northumberland
- 2017–present: Northamptonshire (squad no. 9)
- First-class debut: 2 April 2017 Northamptonshire v Loughborough MCCU
- Only Twenty20: 17 August 2018 Northamptonshire v Leicestershire

Career statistics
Competition	FC	T20
Matches	2	1
Runs scored	1	–
Batting average	1.00	–
100s/50s	0/0	–/–
Top score	1*	–
Balls bowled	276	1
Wickets	2	0
Bowling average	109.00	–
5 wickets in innings	0	–
10 wickets in match	0	n/a
Best bowling	1/75	–
Catches/stumpings	0/–	1/–
- Source: ESPNcricinfo, 24 August 2018

Gareth Wade (born 11 January 1991) is an English cricketer. He made his first-class debut on 2 April 2017 for Northamptonshire against Loughborough MCCU, as part of the Marylebone Cricket Club University fixtures. He made his Twenty20 debut for Northamptonshire in the 2018 t20 Blast on 17 August 2018.
