= Logan Weston =

English cricketer (born 1992)

Personal information
- Full name: Logan Patrick Weston
- Born: 3 July 1992 (age 34); Bradford, West Yorkshire
- Batting: Right-handed
- Bowling: Right-arm off break

Domestic team information
- Years: Team
- 2015–2016: Leeds/Bradford MCCU
- FC debut: 2 April 2015 Leeds/Bradford MCCU v Sussex

Career statistics
| Competition | First-class |
|---|---|
| Matches | 3 |
| Runs scored | 30 |
| Batting average | 7.50 |
| 100s/50s | 0/0 |
| Top score | 22 |
| Catches/stumpings | 5/– |
- Source: Cricinfo, 2 April 2016

Logan Weston (born 3 July 1992) is an English cricketer. He is a right-handed batsman and a right-arm off break bowler. He made his first-class debut for Leeds/Bradford MCCU against Sussex on 2 April 2015.
