= James Lee (cricketer, born 1988) =

English cricketer (born 1988)

Personal information
- Full name: James Edward Lee
- Born: 23 December 1988 (age 37); Sheffield, Yorkshire, England
- Batting: Left-handed
- Bowling: Right-arm fast-medium
- Role: Bowler

Domestic team information
- Years: Team
- 2006–2009: Yorkshire
- 2013: Leeds/Bradford MCCU
- First-class debut: 8 August 2006 Yorkshire v Lancashire
- Last First-class: 24 April 2013 Leeds/Bradford v Leics
- List A debut: 30 August 2009 Yorkshire v Sussex
- Last List A: 27 September 2009 Yorkshire v Essex

Career statistics
Competition	FC	LA
Matches	4	4
Runs scored	87	–
Batting average	14.50	–
100s/50s	0/0	–/–
Top score	34	–
Balls bowled	480	106
Wickets	17	7
Bowling average	18.47	16.57
5 wickets in innings	2	0
10 wickets in match	0	n/a
Best bowling	7/45	3/43
Catches/stumpings	2/–	0/–
- Source: CricketArchive, 1 August 2016

James Edward Lee (born 23 December 1988, Sheffield, South Yorkshire, England) is an English first-class cricketer, who played for Yorkshire County Cricket Club. He is a left-handed batsman and a right-arm medium-fast bowler.

Lee made his first-class cricket debut for Yorkshire during the 2006 season. He remains a part of the Second XI team. Lee was a tail-end batsman for the first team and remains in that position for the Second XI. He was on the defeated Second XI Trophy final side during the 2006 season. He was a member of the England Under-19 squad for the 2008 Under-19 World Cup. He has played six times for England Under-19s in One Day Internationals.
