= Ben Ladd-Gibbon =

English cricketer (born 1994)

Personal information
- Born: 20 May 1994 (age 32); Dorchester, Dorset
- Batting: Right-handed
- Bowling: Right arm medium

Domestic team information
- Years: Team
- 2017: Loughborough MCCU

Career statistics
Competition	FC
Matches	2
Runs scored	10
Batting average	10.00
100s/50s	0/0
Top score	6*
Balls bowled	198
Wickets	4
Bowling average	45.50
5 wickets in innings	0
10 wickets in match	0
Best bowling	3/47
Catches/stumpings	0/–
- Source: Cricinfo, 4 April 2017

Ben Ladd-Gibbon (born 20 May 1994) is an English cricketer. He made his first-class debut on 28 March 2017 for Loughborough MCCU against Leicestershire as part of the Marylebone Cricket Club University fixtures.
