= Andy Laws =

English cricketer

Personal information
- Full name: Andrew Robert Laws
- Born: 21 September 1991 (age 35); Reigate, Surrey, England
- Batting: Right-handed
- Bowling: Right-arm off break

Domestic team information
- Years: Team
- 2009–2018: Cambridgeshire
- 2014: Leeds/Bradford MCCU

Career statistics
Competition	First-class
Matches	2
Runs scored	12
Batting average	6.00
100s/50s	0/0
Top score	7
Balls bowled	42
Wickets	1
Bowling average	24.00
5 wickets in innings	0
10 wickets in match	0
Best bowling	1/17
Catches/stumpings	2/–
- Source: Cricinfo, 19 July 2019

Andrew Robert Laws (born 21 September 1991) is an English former first-class cricketer.

Laws was born at Reigate in September 1991. He was educated at The Leys School, before going up to Leeds Metropolitan University. While studying at Leeds Metropolitan, he made two appearances in first-class cricket for Leeds/Bradford MCCU against Yorkshire and Somerset in 2014. In addition to playing first-class cricket, he also played minor counties cricket for Cambridgeshire in from 2009 to 2018, making three appearances in the Minor Counties Championship and five appearances in the MCCA Knockout Trophy.
