= Charlie MacLeod =

English cricketer (born 1992)

Personal information
- Full name: Charles Alastair Roderick MacLeod
- Born: 31 October 1992 (age 33); Camden, London
- Batting: Right-handed
- Role: Wicket-keeper
- Source: ESPNcricinfo, 7 September 2016

Charlie Macleod (Charles MacLeod) is an English cricketer. He is a right-handed batsman and a wicketkeeper. He made his first-class debut for Leeds/Bradford MCC University against Yorkshire on 5 April 2013.
