= Daniel Young (cricketer) =

English cricketer (born 1990)

Personal information
- Full name: Daniel Robert Young
- Born: 3 October 1990 (age 36); Newcastle upon Tyne, Northumberland, England
- Batting: Right-handed
- Bowling: Right-arm medium

Domestic team information
- Years: Team
- 2011–2014: Northumberland
- 2013–2014: Leeds/Bradford MCCU

Career statistics
Competition	First-class
Matches	3
Runs scored	31
Batting average	5.16
100s/50s	–/–
Top score	14
Balls bowled	6
Wickets	0
Bowling average	–
5 wickets in innings	–
10 wickets in match	–
Best bowling	–
Catches/stumpings	4/–
- Source: Cricinfo, 14 June 2019

Daniel Robert Young (born 3 October 1990) is an English former first-class cricketer.

Young was born at Newcastle upon Tyne in October 1990. He was educated in the city at the Royal Grammar School, before going up to Leeds Metropolitan University. While studying at Leeds, Young played first-class cricket for Leeds/Bradford MCCU, making his debut against Yorkshire in 2013. He made two further first-class appearances for Leeds/Bradford, with a further match in 2013 against Leicestershire, before playing against Yorkshire in 2014. He scored 31 runs in his three matches, with a high score of 14. Young played minor counties cricket for Northumberland from 2011 to 2014, making fifteen appearances in the Minor Counties Championship and seven appearances in the MCCA Knockout Trophy.
