= Charlie Roebuck =

English cricketer

Personal information
- Full name: Charles George Roebuck
- Born: 14 August 1991 (age 35); Huddersfield, Yorkshire, England
- Batting: Right-handed
- Bowling: Right-armed medium-fast

Domestic team information
- Years: Team
- 2010: Yorkshire
- 2012–2014: Leeds/Bradford MCCU
- FC debut: 5 June 2010 Yorkshire v India A
- Last FC: 7 April 2014 Leeds/Bradford MCCU v Somerset

Career statistics
Competition	First-class
Matches	3
Runs scored	54
Batting average	13.50
100s/50s	0/0
Top score	27not out
Balls bowled	6
Wickets	0
Bowling average	–
5 wickets in innings	–
10 wickets in match	–
Best bowling	–
Catches/stumpings	0/–
- Source: Cricinfo.com, 20 April 2023

Charles George Roebuck (born 14 August 1991) is an English former first-class cricketer. A right-handed batsman and right-arm medium fast bowler, Roebuck was contracted to Yorkshire County Cricket Club, for whom he played one first-class match in 2010.

== Biography ==
Roebuck had been with Yorkshire since 2007, and played for the Yorkshire Academy in the Yorkshire ECB County Premier League, and the Yorkshire Second XI in the Second XI Championship. His first-class debut was against India A in June 2010, when Roebuck scored 23 runs in his only innings.

Roebuck has also played in one Youth Test match for England Under 19s against Bangladesh Under 19s, and four Youth One Day Internationals against the same opponents.

In 2011, Roebuck played for the Durham Second XI.
