= Zafir Patel =

Indian cricketer (born 1992)

Personal information
- Full name: Zafir Rashid Patel
- Born: 14 September 1992 (age 34); Baroda, Gujarat, India
- Batting: Right-handed
- Bowling: Right-arm medium-fast
- Relatives: RGM Patel (father)

Domestic team information
- Years: Team
- 2013–2014: Leeds/Bradford MCCU
- First-class debut: 24 April 2013 Leeds/Bradford MCCU v Leicestershire

Career statistics
Competition	FC
Matches	3
Runs scored	20
Batting average	5.00
100s/50s	0/0
Top score	16
Balls bowled	432
Wickets	5
Bowling average	49.60
5 wickets in innings	0
10 wickets in match	0
Best bowling	2/32
Catches/stumpings	1/0
- Source: ESPNcricinfo, 18 March 2025

Zafir Rashid Patel (born 14 September 1992) is an Indian former cricketer who played three first-class matches for Leeds/Bradford MCCU. He was born in Baroda, Gujarat, and is the son of former international cricketer Rashid Patel. He was bought by the Delhi Daredevils for the 2012 Indian Premier League.
