= William Cook (Leeds/Bradford MCCU cricketer) =

English cricketer

Personal information
- Born: 11 October 1995 (age 31); Wolverhampton, England
- Batting: Right-handed
- Bowling: Right-arm fast-medium

Domestic team information
- Years: Team
- 2017: Leeds/Bradford MCCU
- First-class debut: 28 March 2017 Leeds/Bradford MCCU v Kent

Career statistics
Competition	FC
Matches	2
Runs scored	45
Batting average	11.25
100s/50s	0/0
Top score	42
Balls bowled	210
Wickets	2
Bowling average	101.00
5 wickets in innings	–
10 wickets in match	–
Best bowling	1/33
Catches/stumpings	–/–
- Source: Cricinfo, 4 April 2017

William Cook (born 11 October 1995) is an English cricketer. He made his first-class debut on 28 March 2017 for Leeds/Bradford MCCU against Kent as part of the Marylebone Cricket Club University fixtures.
