= Ben Shoare =

English cricketer (born 1995)

Personal information
- Born: 21 September 1995 (age 31)
- Batting: Right-handed
- Bowling: Right-arm off break

Domestic team information
- Years: Team
- 2017: Leeds/Bradford MCCU
- First-class debut: 28 March 2017 Leeds/Bradford MCCU v Kent

Career statistics
Competition	FC
Matches	2
Runs scored	58
Batting average	14.50
100s/50s	0/0
Top score	47
Balls bowled	48
Wickets	1
Bowling average	28.00
5 wickets in innings	0
10 wickets in match	0
Best bowling	1/28
Catches/stumpings	1/–
- Source: Cricinfo, 4 April 2017

Ben Shoare (born 21 September 1995) is an English cricketer. He made his first-class debut on 28 March 2017 for Leeds/Bradford MCCU against Kent as part of the Marylebone Cricket Club University fixtures.
