= Matt Higginbottom =

English cricketer (born 1990)

Personal information
- Full name: Matthew Higginbottom
- Born: 20 October 1990 (age 36); Stockport, Greater Manchester, England
- Nickname: Higgy
- Batting: Left-handed
- Bowling: Right-arm medium-fast

Domestic team information
- Years: Team
- 2012: Leeds/Bradford MCCU

Career statistics
| Competition | First-class |
|---|---|
| Matches | 2 |
| Runs scored | 79 |
| Batting average | 79.00 |
| 100s/50s | –/– |
| Top score | 31* |
| Balls bowled | 174 |
| Wickets | 4 |
| Bowling average | 30.00 |
| 5 wickets in innings | – |
| 10 wickets in match | – |
| Best bowling | 2/22 |
| Catches/stumpings | –/– |
- Source: Cricinfo, 11 July 2012

Matthew Higginbottom (born 20 October 1990) is an English cricketer. Higginbottom is a left-handed batsman who bowls right-arm medium-fast. He was born at Stockport, Greater Manchester.

Higginbottom was educated at New Mills School Business & Enterprise College, before studying Sport and Business Management at Leeds Metropolitan University. While attending the university, he was selected to play for Leeds/Bradford MCCU, making his first-class debut in the team's inaugural first-class match against Surrey at The Oval in 2012. He made a second first-class appearance for the team in that same season against Yorkshire at Headingley. He signed a summer–long contract with Derbyshire for the 2012 season.
