= Joshua Fallows =

English cricketer (born 1998)

Personal information
- Born: 26 July 1998 (age 28)
- Source: Cricinfo, 26 March 2019

Joshua Fallows (born 26 July 1998) is an English cricketer. He made his first-class debut on 26 March 2019, for Leeds/Bradford MCCU against Derbyshire, as part of the Marylebone Cricket Club University fixtures.
