= Alex Evans (cricketer) =

English cricketer

Personal information
- Full name: Huw Alexander Evans
- Born: 9 August 2000 (age 26); Bedford, Bedfordshire, England
- Batting: Left-handed
- Bowling: Right-arm fast-medium
- Role: Bowler

Domestic team information
- Years: Team
- 2019: Loughborough MCCU
- 2019–present: Leicestershire (squad no. 72)
- First-class debut: 26 March 2019 Loughborough MCCU v Leicestershire

Career statistics
Competition	First-class
Matches	9
Runs scored	61
Batting average	6.77
100s/50s	0/0
Top score	15
Balls bowled	1,178
Wickets	14
Bowling average	47.57
5 wickets in innings	0
10 wickets in match	0
Best bowling	3/49
Catches/stumpings	1/–
- Source: Cricinfo, 7 August 2021

Huw Alexander Evans (born 9 August 2000) is a Welsh/English cricketer. He made his first-class debut on 26 March 2019, for Loughborough MCCU in the 2019 Marylebone Cricket Club University Matches. In December 2019, he signed a professional deal with Leicestershire County Cricket Club.
