= Darren Ironside =

English cricketer (born 1995)

Personal information
- Full name: Darren Andrew Ironside
- Born: 18 February 1995 (age 31); Goodmayes, England
- Batting: Right-handed
- Bowling: Right-arm off break

Domestic team information
- Years: Team
- 2017–2025: Suffolk
- 2019: Leeds/Bradford MCCU
- First-class debut: 26 March 2019 Leeds/Bradford MCCU v Derbyshire

Career statistics
Competition	First-class
Matches	3
Runs scored	53
Batting average	10.60
100s/50s	0/0
Top score	24
Balls bowled	110
Wickets	3
Bowling average	41.33
5 wickets in innings	0
10 wickets in match	0
Best bowling	2/20
Catches/stumpings	1/–
- Source: Cricinfo, 5 April 2026

Darren Andrew Ironside (born 18 February 1995) is an English cricketer. He made his first-class debut on 26 March 2019, for Leeds/Bradford MCCU against Derbyshire, as part of the Marylebone Cricket Club University fixtures.
