= Tom Haynes =

English cricketer (born 1997)

Personal information
- Born: 9 September 1997 (age 29)
- Source: Cricinfo, 26 March 2019

Tom Haynes (born 9 September 1997) is an English cricketer. He made his first-class debut on 26 March 2019, for Loughborough MCCU against Leicestershire, as part of the Marylebone Cricket Club University fixtures.
