= Steve Bullen =

English cricketer (born 1992)

Personal information
- Born: 12 July 1992 (age 34); Watford, Hertfordshire
- Batting: Right-handed

Domestic team information
- Years: Team
- 2015–2019: Leeds/Bradford MCCU
- First-class debut: 7 April 2015 Leeds/Bradford MCCU v Yorkshire

Career statistics
Competition	FC
Matches	5
Runs scored	196
Batting average	24.50
100s/50s	0/1
Top score	56
Balls bowled	27
Wickets	0
Bowling average	–
5 wickets in innings	–
10 wickets in match	–
Best bowling	–
Catches/stumpings	0/–
- Source: Cricinfo, 4 April 2017

Steven Frank Gregory Bullen (born 12 July 1992) is an English cricketer. He made his first-class debut on 7 April 2015 for Leeds/Bradford MCCU against Yorkshire as part of the 2015 Marylebone Cricket Club University Matches. He has also played minor counties cricket for Wiltshire.

== Environmental Efforts ==
In 2016, Bullen co-founded Environmental Certification Body Greenleaf TDG with Andrew Woodward, an initiative that aims to provide technology and services to help businesses manage their environmental footprint and catalyse the move to a circular, green economy.
