= Josh Haynes (cricketer) =

English cricketer (born 1999)

Personal information
- Full name: Joshua Luke Haynes
- Born: 13 February 1999 (age 27); Kidderminster, Worcestershire, England
- Batting: Left-handed
- Bowling: Slow left-arm orthodox
- Relatives: Gavin Haynes (father); Jack Haynes (brother)

Domestic team information
- Years: Team
- 2019: Leeds/Bradford MCCU

Career statistics
| Competition | First-class |
|---|---|
| Matches | 2 |
| Runs scored | 38 |
| Batting average | 9.50 |
| 100s/50s | –/– |
| Top score | 20 |
| Balls bowled | 318 |
| Wickets | 4 |
| Bowling average | 48.25 |
| 5 wickets in innings | – |
| 10 wickets in match | – |
| Best bowling | 3/37 |
| Catches/stumpings | 1/– |
- Source: Cricinfo, 7 August 2020

Joshua Luke Haynes (born 13 February 1999) is an English former first-class cricketer.

The son of the cricketer Gavin Haynes, he was born at Kidderminster in February 1999. He was educated at Malvern College, before going up to the University of Leeds. While studying at Leeds, he played two first-class cricket matches for Leeds/Bradford MCCU against Derbyshire and Yorkshire in 2019. He scored 38 runs in his two matches with a high score of 20, while with slow left-arm orthodox bowling, he took 4 wickets with best figures of 3 for 37. His brother, Jack, plays county cricket for Nottinghamshire. The most recent information indicates that he plays semi-professionally for Hornsey Cricket Club, North London, in the Middlesex County Cricket Cup.
