= Jack Scriven =

English cricketer (born 1995)

Personal information
- Born: 4 June 1995 (age 31); Oxford, England
- Source: Cricinfo, 29 March 2017

Jack Scriven (born 4 June 1995) is an English cricketer. He made his first-class debut on 28 March 2017 for Cardiff MCCU against Glamorgan as part of the Marylebone Cricket Club University fixtures.
