= Henry Thompson (cricketer) =

English cricketer (born 1992)

Personal information
- Full name: Henry Lester Thompson
- Born: 1 December 1992 (age 33); Preston, Lancashire
- Batting: Right-handed
- Bowling: Right-arm off break

Domestic team information
- Years: Team
- 2013–2016: Leeds/Bradford MCCU
- FC debut: 5 April 2013 Leeds/Bradford MCCU v Yorkshire

Career statistics
Competition	First-class
Matches	6
Runs scored	114
Batting average	12.66
100s/50s	0/0
Top score	40
Balls bowled	18
Wickets	0
Bowling average	–
5 wickets in innings	–
10 wickets in match	–
Best bowling	–
Catches/stumpings	2/–
- Source: ESPNcricinfo, 7 April 2016

Henry Thompson (born 1 December 1992) is an English cricketer. He is a right-handed batsman and a right-arm off break bowler. He made his first-class debut for Leeds/Bradford MCCU against Yorkshire on 5 April 2013.
