= Dan Hodgson (cricketer) =

English cricketer (born 1990)

Personal information
- Full name: Daniel Mark Hodgson
- Born: 26 February 1990 (age 36); Northallerton, North Yorkshire, England
- Batting: Right-handed
- Role: Wicket-keeper

Domestic team information
- Years: Team
- 2012–2015: Yorkshire (squad no. 18)
- 2012/13: Mountaineers

Career statistics
Competition	FC	LA	T20
Matches	13	14	17
Runs scored	504	296	225
Batting average	22.90	29.60	17.30
100s/50s	0/4	0/3	0/1
Top score	94*	90	52*
Catches/stumpings	34/2	14/3	10/1
- Source: Cricinfo, 30 September 2015

Daniel Mark Hodgson (born 26 February 1990) is an English first-class cricketer. A wicket-keeper and right-handed batsman, Hodgson played for Yorkshire County Cricket Club.

Hodgson played for the Yorkshire Second XI in the Second XI Championship, as well as appearing in his debut List A match for Yorkshire against the Unicorns in August 2012. He took one catch in the game, but was not required to bat. He has since appeared in thirteen more List A matches.

He has had two previous first-class outings representing Leeds/Bradford MCC Universities. Hodgson made a number of appearances for the Mountaineers side in Zimbabwe in 2012 and 2013.

Hodgson spent a short time on loan at Derbyshire in 2014 and was released by Yorkshire in August 2015.
