= Ralph Cornall =

Australian rules footballer

Personal information
- Full name: Ralph Cornall
- Born: 17 March 1894; Drouin, Victoria
- Died: 19 October 1984 (aged 90); Eltham, Victoria
- Original team: North Melbourne (VFA)
- Height: 168 cm (5 ft 6 in)
- Weight: 65 kg (143 lb)

Playing career^{1}
Years	Club	Games (Goals)
1920	Essendon	7 (0)
- ^{1} Playing statistics correct to the end of 1920.

Ralph Cornall (17 March 1894 – 19 October 1984) was an Australian rules footballer who played with Essendon in the Victorian Football League (VFL).
