= Ross Greenwell =

English cricketer (born 1998)

Personal information
- Full name: Ross Liam Greenwell
- Born: 19 September 1998 (age 28); Newcastle-upon-Tyne, Northumberland, England

Domestic team information
- Years: Team
- 2019–present: Durham
- Source: Cricinfo, 26 March 2019

Ross Greenwell (born 19 September 1998) is an English cricketer. He made his first-class debut on 26 March 2019 for Durham against Durham MCCU.
