= Benedict Graves =

English cricketer (born 1996)

Personal information
- Full name: Benedict Graves
- Born: 10 November 1996 (age 30); Hammersmith, London
- Bowling: Left arm orthodox
- Source: Cricinfo, 29 March 2017

Benedict Graves (born 10 November 1996) is an English cricketer. He made his first-class debut on 28 March 2017 for Durham MCCU against Gloucestershire as part of the Marylebone Cricket Club University fixtures.
