= Jack McIver =

English cricketer (born 1992)

Personal information
- Full name: Jack Nathan McIver
- Born: 26 April 1992 (age 34); Hammersmith, London, England
- Source: Cricinfo, 30 March 2017

Jack McIver (born 26 April 1992) is an English cricketer. He made his first-class debut on 2 April 2015 for Oxford MCCU against Worcestershire. He has also played Minor Counties cricket for Shropshire. He was educated at Trinity College, Perth, Australia; Curtin University; and Oxford Brookes University.
