= Nipuna Senaratne =

English cricketer (born 1993)

Personal information
- Born: 19 October 1993 (age 33); Leeds, Yorkshire
- Source: Cricinfo, 3 April 2017

Nipuna Senaratne (born 19 October 1993) is an English cricketer. He made his first-class debut on 5 April 2013 for Cambridge MCCU against Essex.
