= Jack Haynes =

English cricketer (born 2001)

Personal information
- Full name: Jack Alexander Haynes
- Born: 30 January 2001 (age 25); Worcester, Worcestershire, England
- Batting: Right-handed
- Bowling: Right-arm off break
- Role: Batsman
- Relatives: Gavin Haynes (father)

Domestic team information
- Years: Team
- 2018–2023: Worcestershire (squad no. 17)
- 2022: Oval Invincibles
- 2024–present: Nottinghamshire
- First-class debut: 7 August 2019; Worcestershire v Australians
- List A debut: 19 June 2018; Worcestershire v West Indies A

Career statistics
Competition	FC	LA	T20
Matches	87	32	79
Runs scored	4,760	1,428	1,721
Batting average	37.77	49.24	23.57
100s/50s	12/20	3/11	0/9
Top score	157	153	89*
Catches/stumpings	65/–	17/–	30/–
- Source: Cricinfo, 17 November 2026

Jack Alexander Haynes (born 30 January 2001) is an English cricketer who plays for Nottinghamshire County Cricket Club. He previously represented Worcestershire County Cricket Club.

== Career ==
Haynes made his List A debut for Worcestershire against the West Indies A in a tri-series warm-up match on 19 June 2018.

He made his first-class debut for Worcestershire against Australia on 7 August 2019.

In October 2019, Haynes was named in the England under-19 cricket team's squad for a 50-over tri-series in the Caribbean. In December 2019, he was named in England's squad for the 2020 Under-19 Cricket World Cup.

He made his Twenty20 debut on 29 August 2020, for Worcestershire in the 2020 T20 Blast. In May 2022, in the 2022 County Championship, Haynes scored his maiden century in first-class cricket, with an unbeaten 120 against Durham.

In July 2023, Haynes signed a three-year contract with Nottinghamshire which became effective at the conclusion of the season.

Haynes scored his first century for Nottinghamshire against Essex at Trent Bridge in April 2025, making 142 in his side's second innings in a match that finished as a draw.

In September 2026, he scored a career-best 159 against Leicestershire at Trent Bridge and shared in a 257 run stand with Liam Patterson-White which broke the 101 year old record for the highest sixth wicket partnership in a County Championship match between the two East Midlands teams.

In October 2026, Haynes was named in the England Lions squad to tour the Carribbean for a series of white-ball matches against West Indies A the following month.

== Personal life ==
Haynes' father Gavin Haynes is a former professional cricketer who played for Worcestershire. Jack attended Malvern College and was a part of their 1st XI cricket team.
