= Harry Bush (American cricketer) =

American cricketer (born 1989)

Personal information
- Full name: Harry Bush
- Born: November 6, 1989 (age 37); Los Angeles, California, United States
- Batting: Right-handed
- Bowling: Right-arm off break

Domestic team information
- Years: Team
- 2009–2015: Norfolk
- 2012: Leeds/Bradford MCCU

Career statistics
Competition	First-class
Matches	2
Runs scored	118
Batting average	29.50
100s/50s	0/1
Top score	70
Balls bowled	42
Wickets	0
Bowling average	–
5 wickets in innings	–
10 wickets in match	–
Best bowling	–
Catches/stumpings	0/–
- Source: ESPNcricinfo, 25 April 2017

Harry Bush (born November 6, 1989) is an American first-class cricketer who played for Leeds/Bradford MCCU. He made his first-class debut for Leeds/Bradford MCCU against Surrey in March 2012.
