= Joseph Kendall (cricketer) =

English cricketer (born 1996)

Personal information
- Full name: Joseph Samuel Kendall
- Born: 2 December 1996 (age 29); Leicester, Leicestershire, England
- Batting: Right-handed
- Bowling: Leg break

Domestic team information
- Years: Team
- 2018–2019: Lincolnshire
- 2019: Loughborough MCCU

Career statistics
Competition	First-class
Matches	2
Runs scored	95
Batting average	47.50
100s/50s	0/0
Top score	37*
Catches/stumpings	0/–
- Source: Cricinfo, 7 August 2020

Joseph Samuel Kendall (born 2 December 1996) is an English former first-class cricketer.

Kendall was born at Leicester in December 1996. He was educated at Oakham School, before going up to Loughborough University. While studying at Loughborough, he played two first-class cricket matches for Loughborough MCCU against Leicestershire and Kent in 2019. He scored 95 runs in his two matches, with a high score of 37 not out. In addition to playing first-class cricket, Kendall has also played minor counties cricket for Lincolnshire.
