= Sam Rippington =

English cricketer (born 1994)

Personal information
- Born: 8 January 1994 (age 32); Waltham Forest, Essex
- Batting: Left-handed
- Bowling: Left-arm fast-medium
- Role: Bowler
- Source: Cricinfo, 29 March 2017

Sam Rippington (born 8 January 1994) is an English cricketer. He made his first-class debut on 28 March 2017 for Cambridge MCCU against Nottinghamshire as part of the Marylebone Cricket Club University fixtures.
