= Oil & Gas Development Company Limited cricket team =

Pakistani cricket team

Oil & Gas Development Company Limited team

Personnel
- Owner: Oil & Gas Development Company
- Official website: ogdcl.com/corporate-social-responsibility/sports

The Oil & Gas Development Company Limited cricket team, usually shortened to Oil & Gas or OGDCL, is a Pakistani cricket team sponsored by the Oil & Gas Development Company, a state-owned company with its headquarters in Islamabad.

Beginning with the 2024–25 season, OGDCL participates in Pakistan's first-class and List A competitions. OGDCL and Eshaal Associates qualified for promotion to the 2024–25 President's Trophy by reaching the final of the President's Trophy Grade-II, which OGDCL won, in June 2024.

Captained by Adil Amin, OGDCL won their inaugural first-class match in the 2024–25 President's Trophy, beating State Bank of Pakistan by 128 runs. Amin made the team's first first-class century, with 117 not out in the second innings. In their third match, when they defeated Water and Power Development Authority, Asif Afridi took the team's first five-wicket haul, 6 for 52. They finished the tournament in fourth position, with five wins from their eight matches.
