= Stephen Cantwell =

English cricketer (born 1996)

Personal information
- Full name: Stephen Cantwell
- Born: 11 August 1996 (age 30); Durham, County Durham, England
- Batting: Right-handed
- Bowling: Right-arm fast-medium

Domestic team information
- Years: Team
- 2019: Leeds/Bradford MCCU

Career statistics
| Competition | First-class |
|---|---|
| Matches | 2 |
| Runs scored | 73 |
| Batting average | 73.00 |
| 100s/50s | –/– |
| Top score | 43 |
| Balls bowled | 330 |
| Wickets | 2 |
| Bowling average | 92.50 |
| 5 wickets in innings | – |
| 10 wickets in match | – |
| Best bowling | 1/67 |
| Catches/stumpings | 1/– |
- Source: Cricinfo, 7 August 2020

Stephen Cantwell (born 11 August 1996) is an English former first-class cricketer.

Cantwell was born at Durham in August 1996. He was educated there at St Leonard's Catholic School, before going up to the University of Leeds. While studying at Leeds, he played two first-class cricket matches for Leeds/Bradford MCCU against Derbyshire and Yorkshire in 2019. He scored 73 runs in his two matches, with a high score of 43, while with his right-arm fast-medium bowling, he took 2 wickets from 55 overs bowled and 185 runs conceded.
