= Akil Greenidge =

Barbadian cricketer (born 1996)

Personal information
- Full name: Akil Diara Greenidge
- Born: 24 December 1996 (age 29)
- Batting: Right-handed
- Bowling: Right-arm medium

Domestic team information
- Years: Team
- Cambridge MCCU
- Source: Cricinfo, 29 March 2017

Akil Diara Greenidge (born 24 December 1996) is a Barbadian cricketer. He made his first-class debut on 28 March 2017 for Cambridge MCCU against Nottinghamshire, as part of the Marylebone Cricket Club University fixtures. Additionally, he plays for the West Indies cricket team. At age fifteen, Greenidge received a cricket scholarship to Dulwich College in London, England.
