= Alex Wilkinson (cricketer) =

English cricketer (born 1996)

Personal information
- Born: 4 September 1996 (age 30)
- Source: Cricinfo, 29 March 2017

Alex Wilkinson (born 4 September 1996) is an English cricketer. He made his first-class debut on 28 March 2017 for Oxford MCCU against Surrey as part of the Marylebone Cricket Club University fixtures.
