= Gavin Haynes =

English cricketer (born 1969)

Personal information
- Full name: Gavin Richard Haynes
- Born: 29 September 1969 (age 57); Wordsley, Worcestershire, England
- Batting: Right-handed
- Bowling: Right-arm medium
- Role: All rounder
- Relatives: Jack Haynes (son)

Domestic team information
- Years: Team
- 1991–1999: Worcestershire
- First-class debut: 18 June 1991; Worcestershire v Nottinghamshire
- Last First-class: 8 September 1999; Worcestershire v Essex
- List A debut: 26 April 1992; Worcestershire v Northamptonshire
- Last List A: 12 September 1999; Worcestershire v Hampshire

Career statistics
Competition	FC	LA
Matches	100	121
Runs scored	4,173	2,327
Batting average	30.02	25.13
100s/50s	3/24	1/7
Top score	158	116*
Balls bowled	7,070	3,981
Wickets	96	99
Bowling average	36.88	26.52
5 wickets in innings	2	0
10 wickets in match	0	n/a
Best bowling	6/50	4/13
Catches/stumpings	39/–	34/–
- Source: Cricinfo, 19 June 2018

Gavin Richard Haynes (born 29 September 1969) is a retired English professional cricketer who played for Worcestershire from 1991 to 1999. Haynes now coaches Dudley District Cricket club and plays for Ombersley C.C.
