= Jason Marshall (cricketer) =

English cricketer (born 1996)

Personal information
- Full name: Jason David Marshall
- Born: 20 June 1996 (age 30); London, England
- Source: Cricinfo, 29 March 2017

Jason Marshall (born 20 June 1996) is an English cricketer. He made his first-class debut on 28 March 2017 for Durham MCCU against Gloucestershire as part of the Marylebone Cricket Club University fixtures.
