= List of current first-class cricket teams =

This is a list of current first-class cricket teams, organised first by country and then alphabetically. A first class match is one of three or more days' scheduled duration between two sides of eleven players each which is officially adjudged to be worthy of the status by virtue of the standard of the competing teams. Matches must allow for the teams to play two innings each.

Where a team plays at more than one home ground, only their main ground is listed here.

== Afghanistan ==
National team: Afghanistan national cricket team^{1}
Beginning in 2017, Afghanistan domestic matches have had first-class and List A status.

Name	Home ground	Reference
Amo Region	n/a	
Band-e-Amir Region	n/a	
Boost Region	n/a	
Kabul Green	Kabul National Cricket Stadium, Kabul	
Mis Ainak Region	n/a	
Speen Ghar Region	n/a	

== Australia ==
National team: Australia national cricket team

Name	Home ground	Reference
Sheffield Shield teams
New South Wales	Sydney Cricket Ground, Sydney	
Victoria	Melbourne Cricket Ground, Melbourne; Junction Oval, St Kilda	
South Australia	Adelaide Oval, Adelaide	
Queensland	Brisbane Cricket Ground (the Gabba), Brisbane	
Western Australia	WACA Ground, Perth	
Tasmania	Bellerive Oval, Hobart	
Other teams
Cricket Australia XI	Allan Border Field, Queensland	Cricket Australia

== Bangladesh ==
National team: Bangladesh national cricket team

Name	Home ground	Reference
Divisional (National Cricket League)
Barishal Division	Barisal Divisional Stadium, Barishal	
Chattogram Division	Bir Shrestho Flight Lieutenant Matiur Rahman Cricket Stadium, Chattogram	
Dhaka Division	Sher-e-Bangla Cricket Stadium, Dhaka	
Khulna Division	Khulna Divisional Stadium, Khulna	
Mymensingh Division	n/a	
Rajshahi Division	Rajshahi Divisional Stadium, Rajshahi	
Rangpur Division	Rangpur Cricket Garden, Rangpur	
Sylhet Division	Sylhet International Cricket Stadium, Sylhet	
Zones (Bangladesh Cricket League)
Central Zone	Sher-e-Bangla Cricket Stadium, Dhanmondi Cricket Stadium	
South Zone	Sheikh Abu Naser Stadium, Barisal Divisional Stadium	
East Zone	Sylhet Stadium, Zahur Ahmed Chowdhury Stadium	
North Zone	Rajshahi Divisional Stadium, Rangpur Cricket Garden	

Notes:

- Bangladesh A and Bangladeshis matches are also considered first-class.

== England and Wales ==
National team: England cricket team

Name	Home ground	Reference
County teams
Derbyshire County Cricket Club	County Ground, Derby	
Durham County Cricket Club	Riverside Ground, Chester-le-Street	
Essex County Cricket Club	County Cricket Ground, Chelmsford	
Glamorgan County Cricket Club	SWALEC Stadium, Cardiff	
Gloucestershire County Cricket Club	County Cricket Ground, Bristol	
Hampshire County Cricket Club	Rose Bowl, Southampton	
Kent County Cricket Club	St Lawrence Ground, Canterbury	
Lancashire County Cricket Club	Old Trafford, Manchester	
Leicestershire County Cricket Club	Grace Road, Leicester	
Middlesex County Cricket Club	Lord's, London	
Northamptonshire County Cricket Club	County Ground, Northampton	
Nottinghamshire County Cricket Club	Trent Bridge, Nottingham	
Somerset County Cricket Club	County Ground, Taunton	
Surrey County Cricket Club	The Kia Oval, London	
Sussex County Cricket Club	County Cricket Ground, Hove	
Warwickshire County Cricket Club	Edgbaston Cricket Ground, Birmingham	
Worcestershire County Cricket Club	New Road, Worcester	
Yorkshire County Cricket Club	Headingley Cricket Ground, Leeds	
Other team(s)
Marylebone Cricket Club	Lord's, London	MCC

== India ==
National team: India national cricket team

Name	Home ground	Reference
Ranji Trophy teams
Andhra Cricket Association	Dr. Y.S. Rajasekhara Reddy ACA-VDCA Cricket Stadium, Vishakhapatnam	
Assam Cricket Association	Nehru Stadium, Guwahati	
Baroda Cricket Association	Moti Bagh Stadium, Vadodara	
Bengal Cricket Association	Eden Gardens, Kolkata	
Bihar Cricket Association	Moin-ul-Haq Stadium, Patna	
Chhattisgarh State Cricket Sangh	Shaheed Veer Narayan Singh International Cricket Stadium, Naya Raipur	
Delhi & District Cricket Association	Feroz Shah Kotla, Delhi	
Goa Cricket Association	Dr R Prasad Stadium, Margao	
Gujarat Cricket Association	Narendra Modi Stadium, Ahmedabad	
Haryana Cricket Association	Chaudhary Bansi Lal Cricket Stadium, Rohtak	
Himachal Pradesh Cricket Association	Himachal Pradesh Cricket Association Stadium, Dharamsala	
Hyderabad Cricket Association	Rajiv Gandhi International Cricket Stadium, Hyderabad	
Jammu and Kashmir	Sher-i-Kashmir Stadium, Srinagar	
Jharkhand Cricket Association	Keenan Stadium, Jamshedpur	
Karnataka State Cricket Association	M. Chinnaswamy Stadium, Bangalore	
Kerala Cricket Association	Fort Maidan, Palakkad	
Madhya Pradesh Cricket Association	Holkar Stadium, Indore	
Maharashtra Cricket Association	Maharashtra Cricket Association Stadium, Pune	
Cricket Association of Mizoram	Suaka Cricket Stadium, Sihhmui	
Mumbai Cricket Association	Wankhede Stadium, Mumbai	
Orissa Cricket Association	Barabati Stadium, Cuttack	
Punjab Cricket Association	Punjab Cricket Association IS Bindra Stadium, Mohali	
Railways Sports Promotion Board	Karnail Singh Stadium, Delhi	
Rajasthan Cricket Association	Sawai Mansingh Stadium, Jaipur	
Saurashtra Cricket Association	Madhavrao Scindia Cricket Ground, Rajkot	
Services Cricket Association	Palam A Ground, Model Sports Complex, Delhi	
Tamil Nadu Cricket Association	M. A. Chidambaram Stadium, Chennai	
Tripura Cricket Association	Maharaja Bir Bikram College Stadium, Agartala	
Uttar Pradesh	K. D. Singh Babu Stadium, Lucknow	
Vidarbha Cricket Association	VCA Ground, Nagpur	

Notes:
^{1} Rest of India (in the Irani Trophy), India A, and various President's XIs are also adjudged first-class.
^{2} Makeshift zonal teams are also made and guest teams like England lions also play.

== Ireland ==
Since the suspension of the Inter-Provincial Championship after the 2019 season, the only domestic first-class cricket in Ireland has been the Emerald Challenge match, contested in 2024 and 2026 between the Strikers (from Northern Ireland) and the Raiders (from the Republic of Ireland).

== New Zealand ==
National team: New Zealand national cricket team

Name	Home ground	Reference
Auckland Cricket Association	Eden Park, Auckland	
Canterbury Cricket Association	Hagley Oval, Christchurch	
Central Districts Cricket Association	McLean Park, Napier	
Cricket Wellington	Basin Reserve, Wellington	
Northern Districts Cricket Association	Seddon Park, Hamilton	
Otago Cricket Association	University Oval, Dunedin	

== Pakistan ==
National team: Pakistan national cricket team

=== Regional first-class teams (Quaid-e-Azam Trophy) ===
Name	Home ground	Reference
Abbottabad Region		
Azad Jammu & Kashmir Region		
Bahawalpur Region		
Dera Murad Jamali Region		
Faisalabad Region		
Federally Administered Tribal Areas Region		
Hyderabad Region		
Islamabad Region		
Karachi Region Blues		
Karachi Region Whites		
Lahore Region Blues		
Lahore Region Whites		
Larkana Region		
Multan Region		
Peshawar Region		
Quetta Region		
Rawalpindi Region		
Sialkot Region		

=== Departmental first-class teams (President's Trophy) ===
Name	Home ground	Reference
Eshaal Associates		
Ghani Glass		
Higher Education Commission		
Khan Research Laboratories		
Oil & Gas Development Company Limited		
Pakistan Television		
State Bank of Pakistan		
Sui Northern Gas Pipelines Limited		
Water and Power Development Authority		

All teams above current as of the 2024–25 season.

== South Africa ==
National team: South Africa national cricket team

Name	Home ground	Reference
CSA 4-Day Series
Boland	Boland Park, Paarl	
Border	Buffalo Park, East London	
Easterns	Willowmoore Park, Benoni	
Eastern Province	St George's Park, Port Elizabeth	
Free State	Springbok Park, Bloemfontein	
Gauteng	New Wanderers Stadium, Johannesburg	
KwaZulu-Natal Coastal	Kingsmead, Durban	
KwaZulu-Natal Inland	City Oval, Pietermaritzburg	
Limpopo	Polokwane Cricket Club Ground, Polokwane	
Mpumalanga	Uplands College, White River	
Northern Cape	De Beers Diamond Oval, Kimberley	
Northerns	Centurion Park, Centurion	
North West	North West Cricket Stadium, Potchefstroom	
South Western Districts	Recreation Ground, Oudtshoorn	
Western Province	Newlands, Cape Town	

== Sri Lanka ==
National team: Sri Lanka national cricket team

=== Major League Tournament teams ===
Name	Home ground	Reference
Ace Capital Cricket Club		
Badureliya Sports Club	Surrey Village Cricket Ground, Maggona	
Bloomfield Cricket and Athletic Club	Bloomfield Cricket and Athletic Club Ground, Colombo	
Burgher Recreation Club	Burgher Recreation Club Ground, Colombo	
Chilaw Marians Cricket Club	Colombo Cricket Club Ground, Colombo	
Colts Cricket Club	Colts Cricket Club Ground, Colombo	
Colombo Cricket Club	Colombo Cricket Club Ground, Colombo	
Kandy Customs Sports Club		
Kurunegala Youth Cricket Club	Welagedara Stadium, Kurunegala	
Moors Sports Club	Moors Sports Club Ground, Colombo	
Negombo Cricket Club		
Nondescripts Cricket Club	Nondescripts Cricket Club Ground, Colombo	
Nugegoda Sports and Welfare Club		
Panadura Sports Club	Panadura Esplanade, Panadura	
Police Sports Club	Police Park Ground, Colombo	
Ragama Cricket Club	Free Trade Zone Sports Complex, Katunayake	
Sinhalese Sports Club	Sinhalese Sports Club Ground, Colombo	
Tamil Union Cricket & Athletic Club	P. Saravanamuttu Stadium, Colombo	

=== National Super League 4-Day Tournament teams ===
Name	Home ground	Reference
Colombo District		
Dambulla District		
Galle District		
Jaffna District		
Kandy District		

== West Indies ==
National team: West Indies cricket team

Name	Home ground	Reference
Territorial teams
Barbados Cricket Association	Kensington Oval Bridgetown	
The Guyana Cricket Board	Bourda, Georgetown	
Jamaica Cricket Association	Sabina Park, Kingston	
Leeward Islands Cricket Association	Antigua Recreation Ground, Antigua	
Trinidad & Tobago Cricket Board of Control	Queen's Park Oval, Port of Spain	
Windward Islands Cricket Board of Control	Beausejour Stadium, Gros Islet, St Lucia	
Other teams
Combined Campuses and Colleges	Three Ws Oval, Bridgetown	
West Indies Academy		

Note: West Indies 'A' and West Indian XI matches are also considered first-class.

== Zimbabwe ==
National team: Zimbabwe national cricket team

Name	Home ground	Reference
Mashonaland Eagles	Harare Sports Club, Harare	
Matabeleland Tuskers	Queens Sports Club, Bulawayo	
Mid West Rhinos	Kwekwe Sports Club, Kwekwe	
Mountaineers	Mutare Sports Club, Mutare	
Southern Rocks	Masvingo Sports Club , Masvingo	

== Former first-class national teams ==
The following countries have each played first-class cricket as an international team in certain circumstances. Since the suspension of the ICC Intercontinental Cup, the first-class competition in which many of these countries competed between 2004 and 2017, they have played little or no first-class cricket.

- Bermuda
- Canada
- Cayman Islands
- Hong Kong
- Kenya
- Malaysia
- Namibia
- Nepal
- Netherlands
- Papua New Guinea
- Scotland
- Uganda
- United Arab Emirates
- United States
