= Johnny Read =

English cricketer (born 1998)

Personal information
- Full name: Jonathan Read
- Born: 2 February 1998 (age 28); Scarborough, North Yorkshire, England
- Batting: Right-handed
- Role: Wicket-keeper

Domestic team information
- Years: Team
- 2016–2017: Yorkshire (squad no. 27)
- Only First-class: 26 June 2016 Yorkshire v Pakistan A
- Only List A: 27 May 2017 Yorkshire v South Africa A

Career statistics
Competition	FC	LA
Matches	3	1
Runs scored	48	–
Batting average	9.60	–
100s/50s	0/0	–/–
Top score	15	–
Catches/stumpings	9/0	1/0
- Source: , 27 May 2017

Jonathan "Johnny" Read (born 2 February 1998) is an English cricketer who played for Yorkshire County Cricket Club. Read is a right-handed batsmen who also keeps wicket.

He has 10 overall "victims" with 9 of these being at First Class level and the remainder in his only List A appearance against the Pakistan Shaheens. His batting average is only 9.60 with his high score being 15 runs against Yorkshire whilst playing for the Leeds/Bradford Marylebone Cricket Club University.
