= Seb Feszczur-Hatchett =

English cricketer (born 1995)

Personal information
- Full name: Sebastian Alexander Feszczur-Hatchett
- Born: 21 October 1995 (age 31); Hendon, Middlesex
- Bowling: Left-arm medium-fast

Domestic team information
- Years: Team
- 2017: Leeds/Bradford MCCU
- First-class debut: 28 March 2017 Leeds/Bradford MCCU v Kent

Career statistics
Competition	FC
Matches	2
Runs scored	35
Batting average	11.66
100s/50s	0/0
Top score	24*
Balls bowled	348
Wickets	2
Bowling average	110.00
5 wickets in innings	–
10 wickets in match	–
Best bowling	2/91
Catches/stumpings	–/–
- Source: Cricinfo, 4 April 2017

Seb Feszczur-Hatchett (born 1995) is an English cricketer. He made his first-class debut on 28 March 2017 for Leeds/Bradford MCCU against Kent as part of the Marylebone Cricket Club University fixtures.
