= Seb Stewart-Taylor =

Scottish cricketer (born 1995)

Sebastian Stewart-Taylor
Personal information
- Full name: Sebastian Kenneth Stewart-Taylor
- Born: 2 July 1995 (age 31); Irvine, Scotland
- Source: Cricinfo, 2 April 2017

Sebastian Kenneth Stewart-Taylor (born 2 July 1995) is a Scottish cricketer.

He made his first-class debut on 2 April 2017 for Durham MCCU against Essex as part of the Marylebone Cricket Club University fixtures.
