= Jonathon Webb (cricketer) =

English cricketer (born 1992)

Personal information
- Full name: Jonathon Patrick Webb
- Born: 12 January 1992 (age 34); Solihull, Warwickshire, England
- Height: 5 ft 11 in (1.80 m)
- Batting: Right-handed
- Bowling: Right-arm medium

Domestic team information
- Years: Team
- 2013–present: Warwickshire (squad no. 12)
- FC debut: 31 March 2012 Leeds/Bradford MCCU v Surrey
- List A debut: 25 July 2015 Warwickshire v Nottinghamshire

Career statistics
Competition	FC	List A	T20
Matches	6	1	11
Runs scored	95	11	154
Batting average	7.91	11.00	14.00
100s/50s	0/0	0/0	0/1
Top score	38	11	50
Catches/stumpings	4/–	0/–	3/–
- Source: Cricinfo, 5 September 2015

Jonathon Patrick Webb (born 12 January 1992) is an English cricketer who plays for Warwickshire. Primarily a right-handed batsman, he also bowls right-arm medium.
