= Josh Holling =

English cricketer

Personal information
- Full name: Joshua Brynmor Rusby Holling
- Born: 15 February 1996 (age 30); Barnsley, Yorkshire, England
- Batting: Left-handed
- Bowling: Left-arm medium

Domestic team information
- Years: Team
- 2019: Leeds/Bradford MCCU

Career statistics
Competition	First-class
Matches	2
Runs scored	16
Batting average	4.00
100s/50s	–/–
Top score	13
Balls bowled	234
Wickets	4
Bowling average	48.00
5 wickets in innings	–
10 wickets in match	–
Best bowling	3/56
Catches/stumpings	–/–
- Source: Cricinfo, 7 August 2020

Joshua Brynmor Rusby Holling (born 15 February 1996) is an English former first-class cricketer.

Holling was born at Barnsley in February 1996. He was educated at Silcoates School, before going up to Leeds Beckett University. While studying at Leeds, he played two first-class cricket matches for Leeds/Bradford MCCU against Derbyshire and Yorkshire in 2019. He scored 16 runs in his two matches, while with his left-arm medium pace bowling, he took 4 wickets with best figures of 3 for 56.
