= Matthew Taylor (cricketer, born 1999) =

Welsh cricketer (born 1999)

Personal information
- Full name: Matthew John Taylor
- Born: 5 August 1999 (age 27); Wrexham, Denbighshire, Wales
- Batting: Right-handed
- Role: Wicket-keeper

Domestic team information
- Years: Team
- 2017–2026: Bedfordshire
- 2019: Oxford MCCU

Career statistics
Competition	First-class
Matches	2
Runs scored	101
Batting average	50.50
100s/50s	–/1
Top score	61*
Catches/stumpings	1/–
- Source: Cricinfo, 15 July 2020

Matthew John Taylor (born 5 August 1999) is a Welsh first-class cricketer.

Taylor was born in Wrexham in August 1999. He was educated at Bedford Modern School where he was Captain of the first XI. While studying at Bedford, Taylor began playing minor counties cricket for Bedfordshire, making his debut at the age of 18 in the 2017 MCCA Knockout Trophy. Up to and including the 2019 season, Taylor has also played Minor Counties Championship and Minor Counties T20 matches for Bedfordshire County Cricket Club where he was Vice Captain. He has been the Bedfordshire first team batsman wicket keeper 2017 to 2026.Played first grade cricket in the South Australia Premier League 2022/2023 and was the 2nd highest overseas run scorer.

From Bedford he went up to Oxford Brookes University and while studying there he coached the Ladies first XI and made two appearances in first-class cricket for Oxford MCCU against Middlesex and Hampshire in 2019. He scored 101 runs in his two matches, with a high score of 61 not out against Middlesex, which was the highest score by any of the 40 debutants in that round of matches.
