= Xavier Owen =

English cricketer (born 1997)

Personal information
- Full name: Xavier Owen
- Born: 14 June 1997 (age 29); High Wycombe, Buckinghamshire
- Source: Cricinfo, 29 March 2017

Xavier Owen (born 14 June 1997) is an English cricketer. He made his first-class debut on 28 March 2017 for Durham MCCU against Gloucestershire as part of the Marylebone Cricket Club University fixtures.
