= Douglas Pratt (cricketer) =

English cricketer

Personal information
- Full name: Douglas Thomas Piers Pratt
- Born: 4 April 1993 (age 33); Cambridge, Cambridgeshire, England
- Batting: Right-handed
- Bowling: Right-arm fast-medium

Domestic team information
- Years: Team
- 2015: Leeds/Bradford MCCU

Career statistics
Competition	First-class
Matches	2
Runs scored	2
Batting average	–
100s/50s	–/–
Top score	2*
Balls bowled	320
Wickets	5
Bowling average	31.00
5 wickets in innings	–
10 wickets in match	–
Best bowling	2/51
Catches/stumpings	–/–
- Source: Cricinfo, 7 August 2020

Douglas Thomas Piers Pratt (born 14 April 1993) is an English former first-class cricketer.

Pratt was born at Cambridge in April 1993. He was educated at Harrow School, before going up to the University of Leeds. While studying at Leeds, he played two first-class cricket matches for Leeds/Bradford MCCU against Sussex and Yorkshire in 2015. Playing as a right-arm fast-medium bowler, he took 5 wickets in his two matches at an average of 31.00, with best figures of 2 for 51.
