= Charlie Scott (cricketer) =

English cricketer

Personal information
- Full name: Charles Fergus Buchan Scott
- Born: 13 October 1999 (age 27); Hemel Hempstead, Hertfordshire, England
- Batting: Right-handed
- Bowling: Right-arm fast-medium
- Relatives: George Scott (brother)

Domestic team information
- Years: Team
- 2019: Durham MCCU
- 2019: Hertfordshire

Career statistics
Competition	First-class
Matches	2
Runs scored	40
Batting average	13.33
100s/50s	0/0
Top score	32
Catches/stumpings	0/–
- Source: Cricinfo, 11 August 2020

Charles Fergus Buchan Scott (born 13 October 1999) is an English former first-class cricketer.

Scott was born at Hemel Hempstead in October 1999. He was educated at St Albans School, before going up to Durham University. While studying at Durham, he played two first-class cricket matches for Durham MCCU against Durham and Northamptonshire in 2019. He scored 40 runs in his two matches, with a high score of 32. In addition to playing first-class cricket, Scott has also played minor counties cricket for Hertfordshire. His brother, George, plays first-class cricket at county level.
