= Jack Gibbs (cricketer) =

English cricketer (born 2000)

Personal information
- Born: 3 June 2000 (age 26); Birmingham, England
- Source: Cricinfo, 31 March 2019

Jack Gibbs (born 3 June 2000) is an English cricketer. He made his first-class debut on 31 March 2019, for Cardiff MCCU against Sussex, as part of the Marylebone Cricket Club University fixtures. Prior to his first-class debut, he played Second XI cricket for Gloucestershire and was part of the ECB Elite Player programme. In 2017, he was named the under-17 bowler of the year by the Devon Cricket Board.
