= Taylor Cornall =

English cricketer (born 1998)

Personal information
- Full name: Taylor Ryan Cornall
- Born: 9 October 1998 (age 28); Lytham St Annes, Lancashire, England
- Batting: Left-handed
- Bowling: Slow left-arm orthodox

Domestic team information
- Years: Team
- 2019: Leeds/Bradford MCCU
- 2021: Lancashire
- 2022–2023: Worcestershire (squad no. 57)
- First-class debut: 26 March 2019 Leeds/Bradford MCCU v Derbyshire
- List A debut: 5 August 2021 Lancashire v Durham

Career statistics
Competition	FC	LA
Matches	8	9
Runs scored	142	310
Batting average	11.83	44.28
100s/50s	0/0	0/3
Top score	31*	97
Balls bowled	12	128
Wickets	0	3
Bowling average	–	43.33
5 wickets in innings	–	0
10 wickets in match	–	0
Best bowling	–	2/23
Catches/stumpings	5/–	5/–
- Source: Cricinfo, 24 July 2023

Taylor Ryan Cornall (born 9 October 1998) is an English cricketer. He made his first-class debut on 26 March 2019, for Leeds/Bradford MCCU against Derbyshire, as part of the Marylebone Cricket Club University fixtures. He has also played for the Lancashire 2nd XI team. He made his List A debut on 5 August 2021, for Lancashire in the 2021 Royal London One-Day Cup.
