= Chris Searle (cricketer) =

English cricketer

Personal information
- Full name: Christopher James Searle
- Born: 23 December 1998 (age 27); Frimley, Surrey, England
- Batting: Right-handed
- Bowling: Right-arm medium-fast

Domestic team information
- Years: Team
- 2019: Oxford MCCU
- 2019–2020: Oxford University

Career statistics
Competition	First-class
Matches	4
Runs scored	48
Batting average	12.00
100s/50s	0/0
Top score	26
Balls bowled	650
Wickets	8
Bowling average	49.87
5 wickets in innings	0
10 wickets in match	0
Best bowling	2/31
Catches/stumpings	0/–
- Source: Cricinfo, 23 August 2021

Christopher James Searle (born 23 December 1998) is an English first-class cricketer.

Searle was born at Frimley in December 1998. He was educated at Hampton School, before going up to Worcester College, Oxford to study geography. While studying at Oxford, he made his debut in first-class cricket for Oxford MCCU against Middlesex at Northwood in 2019, with Searle making a further appearance in 2019 for Oxford MCCU against Hampshire at Oxford. (Note: Oxford MCCU differs from Oxford University Cricket Club in that it is open to students at Oxford Brookes University, whereas Oxford University Cricket Club is exclusively for students of the constituent colleges of the University of Oxford.) In addition to playing for Oxford MCCU in 2019, he also played first-class cricket for Oxford University against Cambridge University in The University Match of 2019. Searle has previously held a professional contract at Hampshire, having risen through the Hampshire Academy.
