= Eshaal Associates cricket team =

Pakistani cricket team

The Eshaal Associates cricket team is a Pakistani cricket team sponsored by the Lahore real estate company Eshaal Associates. In the 2024–25 season, for the first time, it participated in Pakistan's first-class and List A competitions. Eshaal Associates and Oil & Gas Development Company Limited qualified for promotion to the 2024–25 President's Trophy by reaching the final of the President's Trophy Grade-II in June 2024.

Captained by Umar Siddiq, Eshaal Associates won their inaugural first-class match in the 2024–25 President's Trophy, beating Higher Education Commission by 199 runs. Danish Aziz made the team's first first-class century, with 121 in the first innings. Eshaal Associates finished the tournament in last place, with two wins from their eight matches, and were relegated to Grade II for the 2025–26 season.
