= Louie Shaw =

English cricketer (born 1999)

Personal information
- Full name: Louie John Patrick Shaw
- Born: 4 January 1999 (age 27); Bristol, England
- Batting: Right-handed
- Bowling: Slow left-arm orthodox

Domestic team information
- Years: Team
- 2019: Oxford MCCU

Career statistics
Competition	First-class
Matches	2
Runs scored	11
Batting average	5.50
100s/50s	–/–
Top score	11
Catches/stumpings	1/–
- Source: Cricinfo, 16 July 2020

Louie John Patrick Shaw (born 4 January 1999) is an English first-class cricketer.

Shaw was born at Bristol, where he was educated at Clifton College before going up to Oxford Brookes University. While studying at Oxford Brookes, he made two appearances in first-class cricket for Oxford MCCU in 2019, playing against Middlesex and Hampshire. (Note: Oxford MCCU differed from Oxford University Cricket Club in that it was open to students at Oxford Brookes University, whereas Oxford University Cricket Club is exclusively for students of the constituent colleges of the University of Oxford.) A product of the Somerset academy, he has represented Somerset across various age groups and in early 2017 he toured India with the England under-19 cricket team, playing a single Youth One Day International against the India national under-19 cricket team at Mumbai.
