= Alexander MacQueen (cricketer) =

English cricketer

Personal information
- Born: 12 January 1993 (age 33); Chertsey, Surrey, England
- Batting: Right-handed
- Bowling: Right-arm off break

Domestic team information
- Years: Team
- 2012–2014: Leeds/Bradford MCCU
- 2016: Northumberland

Career statistics
Competition	First-class
Matches	5
Runs scored	166
Batting average	20.75
100s/50s	0/1
Top score	69
Balls bowled	600
Wickets	5
Bowling average	56.80
5 wickets in innings	0
10 wickets in match	0
Best bowling	4/116
Catches/stumpings	2/–
- Source: Cricinfo, 16 June 2019

Alexander MacQueen (born 12 January 1993) is an English former first-class cricketer.

MacQueen was born at Chertsey. He was educated at Gordon's School in Woking, from there he attended the University of Leeds. While studying at Leeds, MacQueen played first-class cricket for Leeds/Bradford MCCU, debuting against Yorkshire at Headingley. He played first-class cricket for Leeds/Bradford MCCU until 2014, making five appearances. He scored 166 runs in these matches, with a high score of 69 which came on debut against Yorkshire. With his right-arm off break bowling, he took 5 wickets at a bowling average of 56.80, with best figures of 4 for 116. He played minor counties cricket for Northumberland in 2016, making two appearances in the Minor Counties Championship.
