= Tom Heathfield =

English cricketer

Personal information
- Full name: Tom Heathfield
- Source: Cricinfo, 29 March 2017

Tom Heathfield is an English cricketer. He made his first-class debut on 28 March 2017 for Oxford MCCU against Surrey as part of the Marylebone Cricket Club University fixtures.
