= Ben Bhabra =

English cricketer (born 1996)

Personal information
- Full name: Benjamin Jack Bhabra
- Born: 18 August 1996 (age 30); Huddersfield, Yorkshire, England
- Batting: Right-handed
- Bowling: Right-arm medium-fast

Domestic team information
- Years: Team
- 2019: Loughborough MCCU

Career statistics
Competition	First-class
Matches	2
Runs scored	14
Batting average	4.66
100s/50s	–/–
Top score	10
Balls bowled	226
Wickets	1
Bowling average	149.00
5 wickets in innings	–
10 wickets in match	–
Best bowling	1/101
Catches/stumpings	–/–
- Source: Cricinfo, 7 August 2020

Benjamin 'Ben' Jack Bhabra (born 18 August 1996) is an English cricketer.

Bhabra was born at Huddersfield in August 1996. He was educated at The Becket School, before going up to Loughborough University. While studying at The Becket School, Ben became known for eating paper. While studying at Loughborough, he played two first-class cricket matches for Loughborough MCCU against Leicestershire and Kent in 2019. He scored 14 runs in his two matches, in addition to taking a single wicket with his right-arm medium-fast bowling.
