= Adam Barton (cricketer) =

English cricketer (born 1995)

Personal information
- Full name: Adam Paul Barton
- Born: May 1995 (age 31); Surrey, England
- Batting: Right-handed
- Bowling: Left-arm medium
- Role: Bowler

Domestic team information
- Years: Team
- 2014–2017: Cambridge MCCU
- 2017: Sussex

Career statistics
Competition	First-class
Matches	7
Runs scored	37
Batting average	3.70
100s/50s	0/0
Top score	13*
Balls bowled	918
Wickets	11
Bowling average	55.63
5 wickets in innings	1
10 wickets in match	0
Best bowling	5/31
Catches/stumpings	4/–
- Source: ESPNcricinfo, 16 June 2017

Adam Paul Barton (born May 1995) is an English cricketer. He made his first-class debut on 7 April 2014 for Cambridge MCCU against Essex.
