= Benazir Hussain =

English ballerina (born 1972)

Benazir Surtees (born 1 July 1972; née Hussain) is an English retired ballerina who was a soloist at the Royal Ballet, Covent Garden.

== Early life ==
Surtees was born in Madras and raised in London.

== Career ==
Surtees was made soloist in 1994 at the Royal Ballet, where she took over roles such as the Lilac Fairy in Sleeping Beauty. She is particularly known for her appearance in the recorded performance of Sleeping Beauty in winter 1994. Her other appearances include Frederick Ashton's Illuminations.

After her final appearance as Gamzatti in La Bayadere she left the Royal Ballet and moved to Australia in 1997. Surtees' first husband was her Royal Ballet colleague Errol Pickford whom she had married in August 1996 and whose new contract with the West Australian Ballet had in fact triggered this transfer. After a year working at the Australian Ballet she continued her career at the West Australian Ballet in Perth from 1998 until her retirement in 2005. Her notable work during that time include Ted Bransen's production of Carmen (1999, studio-recorded in 2002) which she performed together with Daryl Brandwood and her appearances in her final year included 'La Bohème - The Ballet.'

== Personal life ==
She is the younger sister of the cricketer Nasser Hussain.

In 2004, she married Craig Surtees, and their daughter was born in 2006.
