= Leeds/Bradford MCC University =

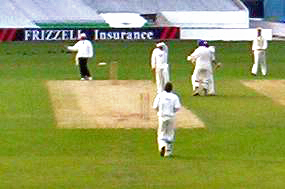
- Leeds/Bradford UCCE beating Surrey at the Oval, 2005

Team information
- Founded: 2005
- Home ground: Weetwood Playing Fields, Leeds

History
- First-class debut: Surrey in 2012 at The Oval

Leeds/Bradford MCC University, formerly Leeds/Bradford University Centre of Cricketing Excellence, commonly abbreviated to Leeds/Bradford MCCU, is one of six University Centres of Cricketing Excellence supported by the Marylebone Cricket Club (MCC).

Leeds/Bradford MCCU play three matches a year against first-class counties. For the first time, in 2012 two of these three matches were given first-class status. In the first of these, their first ever first-class fixture, they lost to Surrey by only two runs. They had previously beaten the same opposition in a non first-class fixture in 2005.

The former Bradford/Leeds University Centre of Cricketing Excellence team did not play first-class cricket. As Leeds/Bradford Marylebone Cricket Club University, the team has played eight first-class matches from 2012 to 2015 (i.e., two per season in early April).

== See also ==
- List of Leeds/Bradford MCCU players
