= List of Cambridge UCCE & MCCU players =

This is a list of cricketers who have played first-class cricket for Cambridge University Centre of Cricketing Excellence (UCCE) and/or Cambridge MCC Universities (MCCU). Players who played first-class cricket for Cambridge University can be found at List of Cambridge University Cricket Club players.

Cambridge UCCE was formed in 2001 by Cambridge University Cricket Club and Anglia Polytechnic University, now Anglia Ruskin University (ARU), with funding and support from Cambridge University and the England and Wales Cricket Board (ECB). It continued until the 2009 season, when the Marylebone Cricket Club (MCC) took over funding from the ECB, at which point it was renamed Cambridge MCC University.

The team played first-class matches until the end of the 2019 season, at which point matches involving university teams were deemed to be no longer first-class. (Note: Matches planned for the 2020 season were cancelled due to the COVID-19 pandemic.)

The details are the player's usual name followed by the years in which he played for the team in first-class matches.

== A ==
- Ben Ackland (2010–2012)
- Jamie Abbott (2013–2016)
- Adnan Akram (2003–2005)
- Arfan Akram (2003–2005)
- Alastair Allchin (2013–2016)
- Mohammad Amin (2005–2009)
- Akbar Ansari (2008–2010)
- Zafar Ansari (2011–2013)
- Adil Arif (2014–2017)
- Josh Arksey (2015–2016)
- Anand Ashok (2010)

== B ==
- Fergus Baker (2007–2009)
- Vansh Bajaj (2019)
- Eddie Ballard (2008–2009) (Note: Ballard, who was born at Harlow in 1988, was educated at Hockerill Anglo-European College and Anglia Ruskin University. He played four first-class matches for Cambridge UCCE and played minor counties cricket for Hertfordshire, Cambridgeshire, and Bedfordshire. He played Second Xi cricket for Surrey and MCC Young Cricketers, and has coached Bedfordshire.)
- Vikram Banerjee (2004–2006)
- Shivaan Bardolia (2016)
- William Barrett (2014)
- Adam Barton (2014–2017)
- Elliot Bath (2012–2014)
- Dean Bell (2011–2013)
- Paul Best (2011–2013)
- Stuart Block (1999–2001)
- Alex Blofield (2015)
- Mark Bott (2006–2009)
- John Bowers (2018)
- Ruel Brathwaite (2009)
- Drew Brierley (2016–2018)
- Frankie Brown (2009–2011)
- Ben Bryant (2016)
- Craig Buckham (2004–2006)
- Jordan Bulpitt (2018)

== C ==
- Josh Cantrell (2019)
- Grant Celliers (2006)
- Utkarsh Chandra (2009)
- Luke Chapman (2017–2019)
- Mark Chapman-Smith (2002)
- Adam Clarke (2001)
- Joel Cliffe (2001)
- Benjamin Collins (2001)
- Tom Colverd (2016–2018)
- James Cowan (2011–2013)
- Ruari Crichard (2015–2017)

== D ==
- Graham Dill (2001)

== E ==
- Philip Edwards (2004–2005)
- Tom Elliott
- Harry Ellison (2014–2016)
- Connor Emerton (2016)

== F ==
- Matthew Friedlander (2005–2008)

== G ==
- Chris Grammer (2009)
- Stephen Gray (2008–2010)
- Akil Greenidge (2017–2019)
- Callum Guest (2017–2019) (Note: Born at Hastings in 1996, Guest was educated at St Bede's School and Anglia Ruskin University. He played five first-class matches for the UCCE team between 2017 and 2019, taking eight wickets and scoring 68 runs. He played age-group cricket for Sussex, Second XI Championship cricket for Unicorns in 2017, and has since played National Counties cricket for Cambridgeshire.)
- Amit Gupta (2011)

== H ==
- Sam Handley (2018)
- Thomas Harvey (2004)
- Alex Hearne (2013–2014)
- Duncan Heath (2002–2003)
- John Heath (2002)
- Toby Hembry (2004–2005)
- Tom Hemingway (2008)
- Richard Hesketh (2010)
- James Heywood (2003–2006)
- Matt Hickey (2011)
- Matthew Hooper (2005)
- Charlie Hopkins (2010)
- Phil Hughes (2010–2015)
- Toby Hughes (2001–2002)
- Chris Huntington (2006–2007)
- Edward Hyde (2019)

== J ==
- Gareth James (2004–2007)
- Kunal Jogia (2006–2008)
- Adam Johnson (2001)
- James Johnson (2012–2014)
- John Jordison (2002)
- Andrew Joslin (2009–2010) (Note: Joslin played twice for the UCCE/MCCU team in first-class matches, as well as appearing for MCC Universities in the Second XI Championship. Born at Leytonstone in 1989, he played age-group cricket for Essex and attended Anglia Ruskin University.)

== K ==
- Matthew Kay (2004)
- Jack Keeping (2018–2019)
- Robin Kemp (2007)
- Vikram Kumar (2001–2003)

== L ==
- Nick Lee (2004–2010)
- Jivan Lotay (2009)

== M ==
- Scott MacLennan (2007)
- Joseph McCluskie (2011)
- Richard Mann (2003)
- Adam Mansfield (2014)
- Simon Marshall (2002–2004)
- Ian Massey (2006–2007)
- Bhargav Modha (2007)
- Tim Moses (2017)
- James Moyes (2002)

== N ==
- Grant Nicholson (2013) (Note: Nicholson, who was born at Leeds in 1994, was educated at Sedbergh School. He played Minor Counties cricket for Northumberland in 2012, and made one first-class appearance for the MCCU team, scoring one run and bowling 32 wicketless overs.)
- David Noble (2002)

== O ==
- Liam O'Driscoll (2007–2008)
- Freddie Owen (2008)

== P ==
- Tony Palladino (2003–2005)
- Harrison Palmer (2016–2018)
- Craig Park (2010–2012)
- Garry Park (2003–2005)
- James Park-Johnson (2019)
- Jamie Parker (2002)
- Avish Patel (2016)
- Rishi Patel (2019)
- Alasdair Pollock (2013–2015)
- Josh Poysden (2011–2013)
- James Pyemont (2001)

== R ==
- Sam Rippington (2017–2019)
- Will Rist (2007–2008)
- Marc Rosenberg (2009)

== S ==
- Paddy Sadler (2011–2014)
- Matt Salisbury (2012–2013)
- Tom Savill (2002–2006)
- Christopher Sayers (2001)
- James Scott (2001)
- Ben Seabrook (2018–2019) (Note: Seabrook, who was born at Slough in 1998, was educated at Bottisham Village College and Long Road Sixth Form College in Cambridgeshire, before attending Anglia Ruskin University. He played Minor Counties cricket for Cambridgeshire from 2016, and made three first-class appearances for the MCCU team, scoring 94 runs. He played Second XI cricket for Durham in 2018 and was a member of the county's Academy for the 2018 season. He has since played more Minor Counties cricket for Cambridgeshire and in 2023 played for Cornwall.)
- Ananya Sen (2009)
- Nipuna Senaratne (2013–2017)
- Adrian Shankar (2002–2005)
- Faisal Sharif (2002)
- Zoheb Sharif (2005–2007)
- Alex Simcox (2001–2002)
- Rudi Singh (2003–2005)
- Brendan Smith (2006–2007)
- Matthew Smith (2019)

== T ==
- Banutheeban Tavarasa (2007)
- Michael Taylor (2010)
- Joseph Tetley (2015–2017)
- Patrick Tice (2017)
- Richard Timms (2005–2008)
- Peter Turnbull (2009–2012)

== W ==
- Alex Waghorn (2016)
- Thomas Webley (2003–2005)
- Adam Wheater (2010)
- Adam Woodhouse (2008)
- Rob Woolley (2009–2012) (Note: Born at Tameside in Manchester, Woolley was educated at St Bede's College in the city before going up to Cambridge University. He played age-group and Second XI cricket for Lancashire, Second XI cricket for Sussex and MCC Universities, and minor counties cricket for Cheshire and Cambridgeshire. As well as eight first-class matches for Cambridge UCCE, he played seven List A matches for Unicorns.)
- Andrew Wright (2015)
- Chris Wright (2004–2005)
- Ben Wylie (2013–2015)

== Y ==
- Chad Yates (2014) (Note: Born at Leicester in 1988, Yates played Second XI cricket for Leicestershire and Essex, and minor countries cricket for Bedfordshire, before appearing in two first-class matches for Cambridge UCCE whilst studying at Anglia Ruskin University in 2014.)

== Z ==
- Misem Zaidi (2017)
- Zain Shahzad (2014–2015)
