= List of Essex Cricket Board List A players =

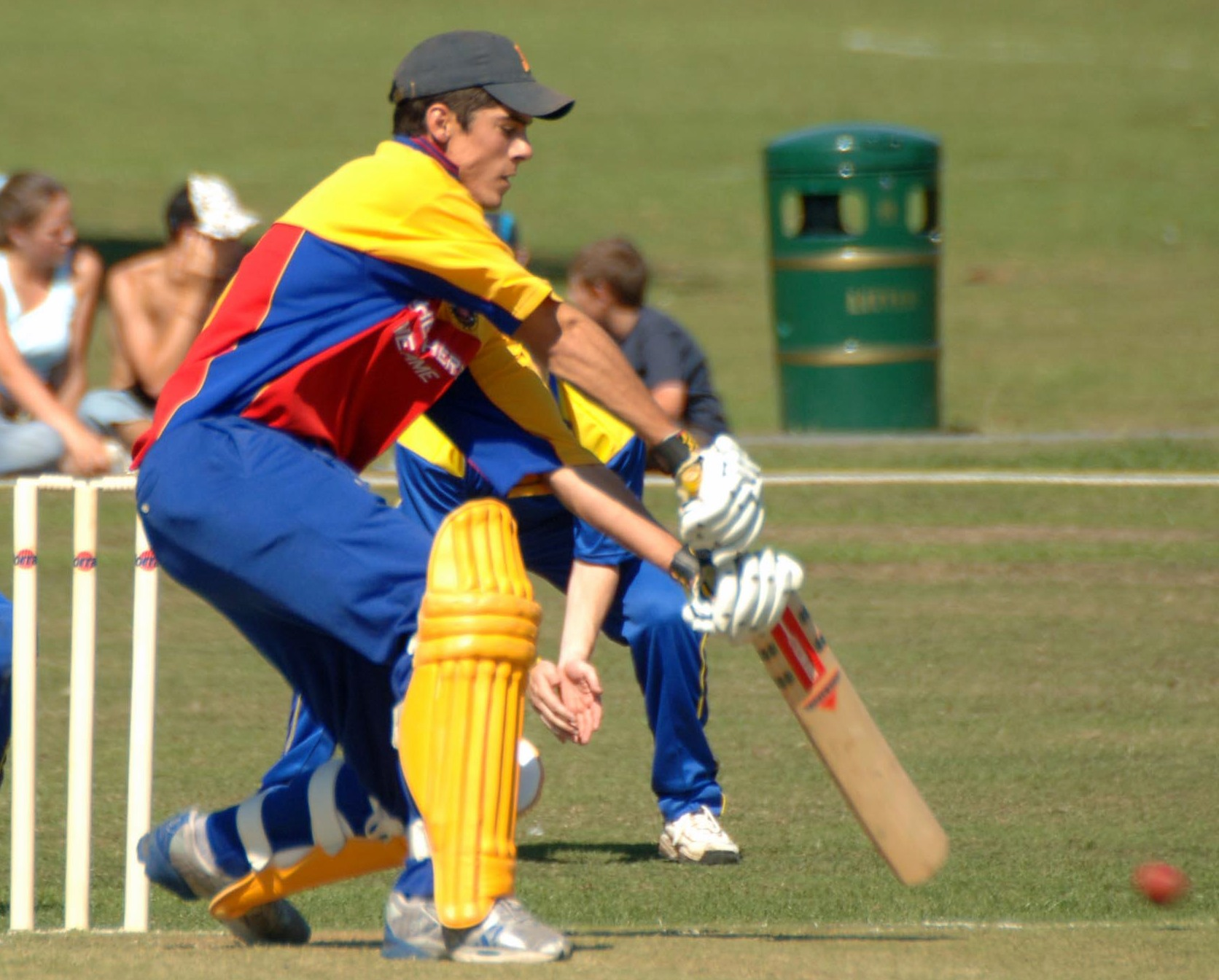
Future England captain Alastair Cook made his List A debut for the Essex Cricket Board in 2003.

The Essex Cricket Board (ECB) team competed in List A cricket from 1999 until 2003, taking part in the England and Wales Cricket Board's main knock-out trophy, known as the NatWest Trophy and then Cheltenham & Gloucester Trophy while the ECB played in it. Established as the Gillette Cup in 1963, the knock-out trophy expanded from 32 teams to 60 teams in 1999, featuring all of the minor counties, and the Cricket Board teams from the first-class counties. The Cricket Board teams were considered to be roughly equivalent talent to the minor counties, and they all entered in the first or second round, prior to the first-class counties who entered in the third round.

Alex Richards was the team's highest aggregate run-scorer, accumulating 172 runs for the team, while Andrew Churchill, Simon Moore and Arif Saeed each took 5 wickets for the ECB the joint most for the team. Saad Janjua, who only played for the team twice, scored the team's highest score with 91 against the Surrey Cricket Board in 2002,, while Tauseef Ali , has the best bowling figures for the team, after taking four wickets in the same match. In all, 35 players have appeared for the ECB, of which 13 have also made first-class cricket appearances.

Players are initially listed in order of appearance, where players made their debut in the same match, they are ordered by batting order.

== Key ==
All statistics apply only to matches played for Essex Cricket Board

General

- ‡ – Captain
- † – Wicket-keeper
- ^{F} – Player has appeared in first-class cricket
- First – Year of debut
- Last – Year of latest match played
- Mat – Number of matches played

Batting

- Inn – Number of innings batted
- NO – Number of innings not out
- Runs – Runs scored
- HS – Highest score
- Avg – Runs scored per dismissal
- * – Batsman remained not out

Bowling

- Balls – Balls bowled
- Wkt – Wickets taken
- BBI – Best bowling in an innings
- Ave – Average runs per wicket
- Eco – Economy rate

Fielding

- Ca – Catches taken
- St – Stumpings effected

== List of players ==
Essex Cricket Board List A players
No.	Name	Nationality	First	Last	Mat	Batting			Bowling				Fielding		Ref(s)
No.	Name	Nationality	First	Last	Mat	Runs	HS	Avg	Balls	Wkt	BBI	Ave	Ca	St	Ref(s)
1	Andrew Hibbert ‡† ^{F}	England	1999	2001	4	94	59	23.50	0	–	–	–	2	0	
2	Nicholas Carlier	England	1999	2000	3	92	56	30.66	0	–	–	–	1	0	
3	Giles Ecclestone ‡	England	1999	2001	5	143	66	28.60	90	0	–	–	5	0	
4	Alex Richards ‡	England	1999	2003	6	172	64	28.66	0	–	–	–	4	0	
5	Andrew Churchill	England	1999	2001	4	19	10	4.75	210	5	2/32	29.00	2	0	
6	Christopher Sharp	England	1999	1999	1	13	13	13.00	18	0	–	–	0	0	
7	Simon Fitzgerald †	England	1999	2001	4	40	19	10.00	0	–	–	–	2	1	
8	Timothy Jones	England	1999	2000	3	46	29*	23.00	144	4	2/36	26.75	0	0	
9	Andrew MacKinlay	South Africa	1999	2001	4	72	33*	36.00	219	3	1/31	49.00	0	0	
10	Arif Saeed	Pakistan	1999	2001	3	25	25*	25.00	168	5	2/33	21.20	2	0	
11	Jamie Sparrow	England	1999	1999	1	–	–	–	54	2	2/42	21.00	0	0	
12	Graham Napier ^{F}	England	2000	2000	1	79	79	79.00	42	1	1/37	37.00	0	0	
13	Christopher Sains	England	2000	2000	1	2	2*	–	18	0	–	–	0	0	
14	Simon Moore	England	2000	2001	4	20	9*	10.00	211	5	2/25	25.80	1	0	
15	Royston Smith	England	2000	2002	3	27	11	9.00	0	–	–	–	1	0	
16	Ian Flanagan ^{F}	England	2001	2001	1	3	3	3.00	0	–	–	–	0	0	
17	Devang Gandhi ^{F}	India	2001	2001	2	28	23	14.00	84	3	3/19	15.33	0	0	
18	Andrew Clarke ^{F}	England	2001	2001	1	0	0	0.00	54	0	–	–	0	0	
19	John Chambers	England	2001	2001	1	0	0	0.00	24	0	–	–	0	0	
20	Ravi Bopara ^{F}	England	2001	2001	1	1	1	1.00	0	–	–	–	0	0	
21	Mel Hussain ^{F}	England	2001	2001	1	12	12	12.00	18	0	–	–	0	0	
22	Andrew Kennedy ‡	England	2001	2003	3	72	27	24.00	36	1	1/37	37.00	2	0	
23	Duncan Paveling †	England	2001	2002	2	15	11	7.50	0	–	–	–	0	0	
24	Rory Ellison	Ireland	2001	2001	1	0	0	0.00	54	1	1/48	48.00	0	0	
25	Chris Williams	England	2002	2002	1	7	7	7.00	24	0	–	–	0	0	
26	Adnan Akram	England	2002	2003	2	88	61	44.00	12	0	–	–	0	0	
27	Tauseef Ali ^{F}	Pakistan	2002	2003	2	65	65	32.50	102	4	4/66	31.50	1	0	
28	Arfan Akram ^{F}	England	2002	2003	2	10	10*	10.00	0	–	–	–	0	0	
29	Gareth James ^{F}	England	2002	2003	2	52	51*	52.00	0	–	–	–	0	0	
30	Saad Janjua ^{F}	Singapore	2002	2003	2	128	91	64.00	108	2	2/78	56.50	1	0	
31	Tony Palladino ^{F}	England	2002	2003	2	16	16	16.00	113	3	3/56	30.00	1	0	
32	Chris White	England	2002	2002	1	–	–	–	60	2	2/34	17.00	0	0	
33	Alastair Cook † ^{F}	England	2003	2003	1	27	27	27.00	0	–	–	–	1	0	
34	Mohammad Akhtar	Pakistan	2003	2003	1	71	71	71.00	60	2	2/46	23.00	0	0	
35	Jamie Went	England	2003	2003	1	1	1	1.00	60	1	1/64	64.00	0	0	
