= Cambridge UCCE and Cambridge University in 2005 =

Cambridge UCCE
2005 season
- Captain: Thomas Webley; Richard Mann
- Ground(s): Fenner's

Cambridge UCCE had a good start to their 2005 first-class season, setting Essex a target of 270 to win, after declaring in their second innings on 255 for 4. They took 6 wickets in defending the total, although they lost to the county in the end. They then narrowly lost to Warwickshire before beating Yorkshire in their last game of the season against a first-class county. They also played two matches as Cambridge University against Oxford University, winning the one-day game, but falling by an innings and 213 runs in their final first-class game of the season.

== Players ==
- Adnan Akram
- Arfan Akram
- Vikram Banerjee
- Craig Buckham
- James Chervak
- Phil Edwards
- Matthew Friedlander
- Duncan Heath
- Toby Hembry
- James Heywood
- Matthew Hooper
- Benjamin Jacklin
- Gareth James
- Robin Kemp
- Mohammed Amin
- Tony Palladino
- Garry Park
- Tom Savill
- Adrian Shankar
- Anirudh Singh
- Zoheb Sharif
- Richard Timms
- Chris Wright

== Match details ==
=== Cambridge UCCE v Essex (9–11 April) ===
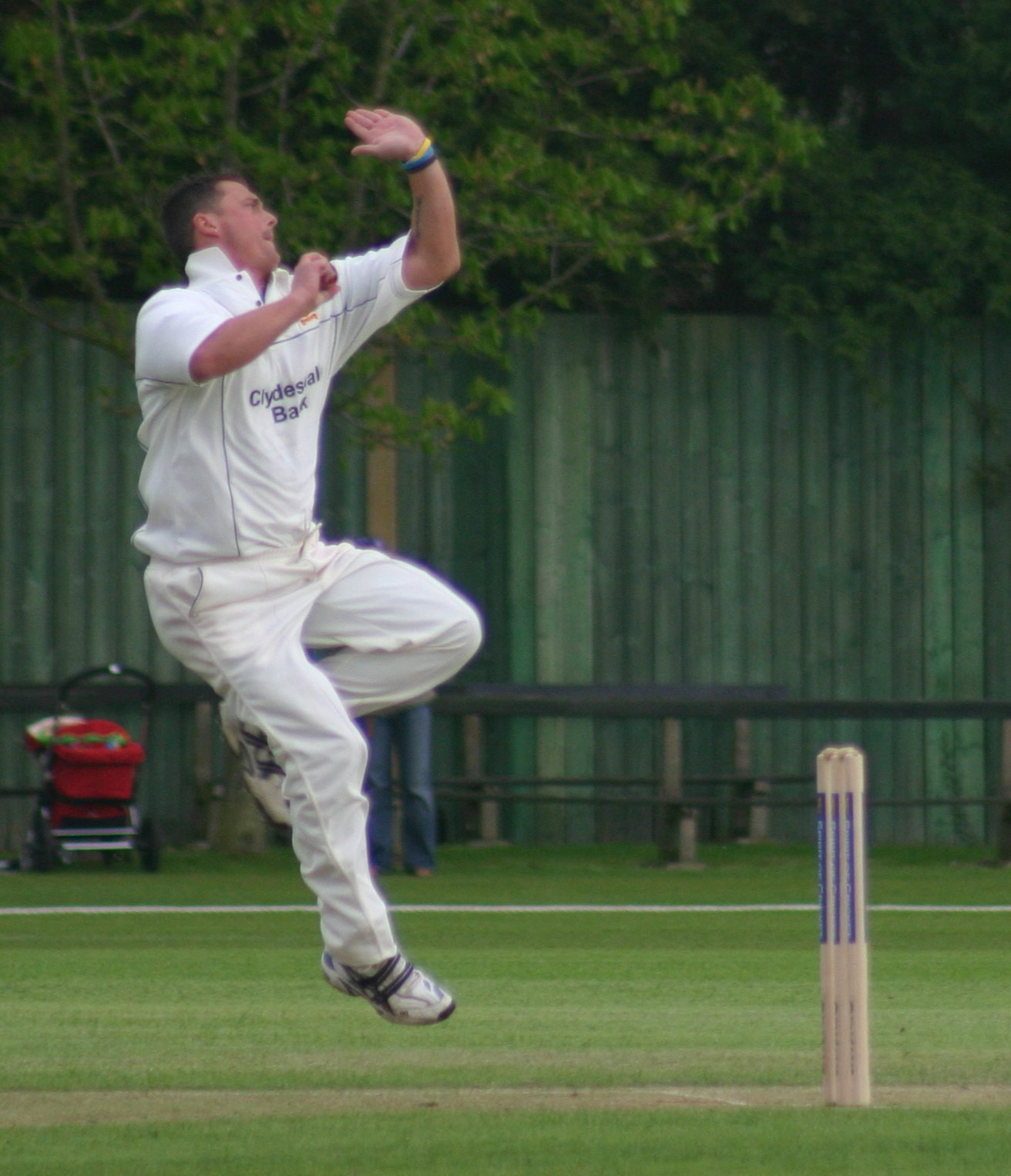
Darren Gough bowling for Essex against Cambridge UCCE

Essex beat Cambridge UCCE by 4 wickets

Cambridge UCCE and Essex started the season at Fenner's Ground in Cambridge. For the first time the Cambridge UCCE team was dominated by players from Anglia Polytechnic University rather than Cambridge University. The first day was a successful one for Cambridge UCCE, who completed an innings of 321. This was quite a recovery from 7 down for 139, when Friedlander (81), who has represented Boland in South Africa, and Wright (76) got together. James Middlebrook took 5 for 54 for Essex. On the second day, Essex put together 307 for 4 declared, although no player scored more than Ravinder Bopara, with 69. Cambridge UCCE scored 64 for 3 by close of play. On the third and final day, Cambridge UCCE piled on more runs, finally declaring on 255 for 4, the highlight of which being 129 not out from Adnan Akram.

This left Essex 270 to win. They lost wickets in doing so, with Palladino taking four wickets, and the students gamely going for a win. However, an all-round performance by Essex finally saw them home with four wickets left. (Cricinfo scorecard)

=== Cambridge UCCE v Warwickshire (21–23 May) ===
Warwickshire beat Cambridge UCCE by 18 runs

Warwickshire survived a scare as a virtual second XI still beat the Cambridge students by 18 runs. The first day at Fenner's was ruined by rain, with only 6 overs possible. Warwickshire batted first, losing three wickets for no runs to collapse to 48 for 4, but Jonathan Trott's three-hour 150 not out lifted the visitors to 296 for 6 declared. In reply, Zohail Sharif made an unbeaten fifty as the students made their way to 109 for 1 in just 24 overs. An overnight declaration from the students was followed by an equalling blazing accumulation of runs from Warwickshire led them to 127 for 1. In the reply, Cambridge came too close for comfort, though, and at 281 for 6 with 34 runs left to hit it looked like they could do it - but opening batsman and off spinner Alex Loudon came to the rescue with three wickets for 48, as Cambridge collapsed to 296 all out and lost the match by 18 runs. (Cricinfo scorecard)

=== Cambridge UCCE v Middlesex (1–3 June) ===
Cambridge UCCE beat Middlesex by 2 wickets

Cambridge UCCE's last game against county opposition of the season was against Middlesex at Fenner's, and the students recorded their first first class victory of the year. In 45 overs of possible play on the first day, Middlesex amassed 182 for 2, with Ben Hutton making an unbeaten century. They lost Hutton for 111 on the second morning, but pushed onward to 273 for 3 before declaration, and then dismissed Cambridge UCCE for a sorry 151 before reaching 101 for 3 by close on the second day. On the third day they sportingly declared on 154 for 3, leaving Cambridge UCCE to get 277. Despite 75 from Thomas Webley, they looked down and out at 182 for 7. But Garry Park and Tony Palladino, who also played first-class cricket for Essex in 2005, stayed in shared a 76-run partnership before Palladino was caught behind for 30. The remaining runs were then knocked off by Park, who finished on 48, and Philip Edwards, leaving the students narrow victors. (Cricinfo scorecard)

=== Cambridge University v Oxford University (17 June) ===
Cambridge University won by five wickets

Economical bowling and poor hitting saw Cambridge get a relatively easy target of 191 against an Oxford side including former England U-19 player Michael Munday. However, the match at Lord's was close right till the end, former Nottinghamshire bowler Tom Savill smacking 33 off 20 balls after having taken four for 28 with the ball. Munday, meanwhile, was inexplicably left to only bowl five overs - which went for 18 runs. (Cricinfo scorecard)

=== Cambridge University v Oxford University (28 June – 1 July) ===
Oxford University won by an innings and 213 runs

Oxford UCCE recorded a thumping victory over Cambridge UCCE in the annual Varsity match between the two universities. At Fenner's, the visitors Oxford won the toss, and made exceptionally good use of the wicket. After losing two early wickets, Indian Salil Oberoi and Birmingham lad Dan Fox entered the frame. The two batted unbeaten till stumps on day 1, leading Oxford to a nearly unassailable 436 for 2, as Oberoi closed on 222 not out - 16 short of the Nawab of Pataudi senior's record - and on the morning of day two, he broke it. With 247, he'd made the highest score ever in a Varsity game - and Fox's and Oberoi's partnership of 408 for the third wicket was an Oxford all-wicket record.

By the time captain and all-rounder Paul McMahon (a former Nottinghamshire player) declared, Oxford were 610 for 5, having two and a half days to bowl out their rivals. Cambridge quickly crumbled to 21 for 3, thanks to three wickets from Amit Suman, but the fourth-wicket partnership yielded 97 runs — as it turned out, 70% of Cambridge's final score for the innings. Captain McMahon's off-spin was responsible for five Cambridge wickets, as they went from 118 for 4 to 129 for 9, amid frequent rainshowers on the third day. Rain stayed away on the fourth day, however, and after taking the final wicket three balls into the day captain McMahon wisely used his spinners - i.e. himself and former England U-19 leg-spinner Michael Munday - to get through the overs quickly. Despite 75 from Anirudh Singh, Cambridge lasted for 106 overs, but were still all out for 268 - and were comprehensively beaten. (Cricinfo scorecard)
