= Chris Williams =

Chris Williams may refer to:

== Sportspeople ==
=== American football ===
- Chris Williams (defensive back) (born 1959), American football player
- Chris Williams (defensive lineman, born 1968), American football defensive lineman
- Chris Williams (offensive lineman) (born 1985), American football offensive tackle
- Chris Williams (wide receiver) (born 1987), American football wide receiver
- Chris Williams (defensive tackle) (born 1998), American football defensive tackle

=== Association football (soccer) ===
- Chris Williams (Canadian soccer) (born 1981), Canadian soccer player
- Chris Williams (English footballer) (born 1985), English professional footballer
- Chris Williams (football manager) (born 1986), Australian football manager

=== Golf ===
- Chris Williams (South African golfer) (born 1959), South African golfer
- Chris Williams (American golfer) (born 1991), American golfer

=== Other sports ===
- Chris Williams (basketball) (1980–2017), American basketball player
- Chris Williams (cricketer, born 1983), English cricketer
- Chris Williams (cyclist) (born 1971), Welsh cyclist
- Chris Williams (rugby league) (born 1972), Australian rugby league player

== Others ==
- Chris Williams (bishop) (1936–2026), Anglican bishop in Canada
- Chris Williams (journalist) (born 1951/52), editor of the Scottish Daily Mail
- Chris Williams (academic) (1963–2024), Welsh academic and historian
- Chris Williams (actor) (born 1967), American actor and comedian
- Chris Williams (pornographic actor) (1967–1991), American actor and model
- Chris Williams (director) (born 1968), American film director
- Chris J. K. Williams, British structural engineer
- Christopher K. I. Williams (born 1960), British computer science professor
- Chris Williams, drummer for American musical group Control Denied
- Chris Williams, drummer for American musical group Pat McGee Band

== See also ==
- Christopher Williams (disambiguation)
- Kris Williams (disambiguation)
- Christine Williams (disambiguation)
