= Christopher Williams =

Christopher Williams may refer to:

== Artists ==
- Christopher Williams (American artist) (born 1956), artist and photographer
- Christopher Williams (Welsh artist) (1873–1934)
- Christopher Williams, comic book illustrator known as ChrisCross
- Christopher Williams (born 1951), British cartoonist who uses the name Kipper Williams

== Sportspeople ==
- Christopher Williams (bobsleigh) (1927–2012), British bobsledder
- Christopher Williams (cricketer) (born 1954), Australian cricketer
- Christopher Williams (cyclist) (born 1981), Australian cyclist
- Christopher Williams (soccer) (born 1984), American soccer player
- Christopher Williams (sprinter) (born 1972), Jamaican athlete
- Christopher Williams (rugby union) (born 1950), English rugby player
- Christopher Morales Williams (born 2004), Canadian sprinter

== Other people ==
- C. J. F. Williams (1930–1997), English philosopher
- Christopher Williams (academic) (born 1952), English academic
- Christopher Williams (singer) (born 1967), singer-songwriter
- Christopher Harris Williams (1798–1857), U.S. congressman from Tennessee
- Christopher K. I. Williams (born 1960), professor of computer science
- Christopher Sapara Williams (1855–1915), first indigenous Nigerian lawyer
- Christopher Williams (astronaut), American medical physicist and astronaut
- Kit Williams (born 1946), English artist, illustrator and author

== Other uses ==
- "Christopher Williams" (Cold Squad), a 1998 television episode

== See also ==
- Christopher Hodder-Williams (1926–1995), English writer
- Jaidynn Diore Fierce, American drag queen born Christopher Williams
- Chris Williams (disambiguation)
- Kris Williams (disambiguation)
