= Arfan =

Arfan is a surname and male given name. Notable people with this name include:

== Surname ==
- Muhammad Arfan (born 1998), Indonesian football player
- Arfan Ariff (born 2007), Malaysian football player

== Given name ==
- Arfan Akram (born 1983), cricket player
- Arfan Bhatti (born 1977), Norwegian Islamist
- Mohd Arfan Rashid (born 1991), Malaysian football player
