= Chris White =

Chris White or Christopher White may refer to:

== People ==
=== Music ===
- Chris White (American bassist) (1936–2014), American jazz bassist
- Chris White (musician, born 1943), British bassist and songwriter with The Zombies
- Chris White (saxophonist) (born 1955), British jazz/rock saxophonist
- Christopher White (pianist) (born 1984), classical pianist, musicologist and repetiteur

=== Sports ===
- Chris White (archer) (born 1979), British archer
- Chris White (cricketer) (born 1980), English cricketer
- Chris White (darts player) (born 1971), Canadian-American darts player
- Chris White (lacrosse) (born 1980), lacrosse player
- Chris White (linebacker) (born 1989), American football linebacker for the New England Patriots
- Chris White (offensive lineman) (born 1983), American football center for the New York Giants
- Chris White (rower) (born 1960), New Zealand rower
- Chris White (rugby union) (born 1967), English rugby union referee

=== Other ===
- Chris White (multihull designer), American sailboat designer
- Chris White (British politician) (born 1967), British Member of Parliament
- Chris White (Oklahoma politician), American politician from Oklahoma
- Sir Christopher White (art historian) (1930–2026), British art historian
- Christopher White (technician), chemist and laboratory technician
- R. Christopher White, visual effects artist
- Christin "Chris" White, contestant in America's Next Top Model

== Other uses ==
- "Christopher White" (ballad), a song

== See also ==
- Christopher Wight (born 1959), cricketer from the Cayman Islands
- Christopher Whyte (disambiguation)
