= James Heywood =

James Heywood or Haywood may refer to:

- Jamie Heywood (born 1966), American mechanical engineer who co-founded the ALS Therapy Development Institute
- James Heywood (philanthropist) (1810–1897), British MP, philanthropist and social reformer
- James Heywood (cricketer) (born 1982), English cricketer
- James Modyford Heywood (c. 1729–1798), English MP and plantation owner in Jamaica
