= Timothy Jones =

Timothy or Tim Jones may refer to:

== Sports ==
- Tim Jones (American football) (born 1998), American football wide receiver
- Tim Jones (infielder) (born 1962), baseball infielder
- Tim Jones (pitcher) (born 1954), American baseball pitcher
- Tim Jones (sledge hockey) (born 1987), American sledge hockey player
- Tim Jones (swimmer) (born 1967), British swimmer
- Timothy Jones (cricketer) (born 1978), former English cricketer
- Timothy Jones (cyclist) (born 1975), Zimbabwe cyclist
- Timothy Booth Jones (born 1952), former English cricketer

== Politics ==
- Tim Jones (politician) (born 1971), Republican member of the Missouri House of Representatives
- Tim Jones (Canadian politician)

== Other ==
- Tim Jones (search and rescue) (1956–2014), Canadian media spokesperson for North Shore Rescue in Vancouver
- Tim Jones (writer) (born 1959), New Zealand poet and author
- Tim Jones (film composer) (born 1971), American composer and musician
- Timothy Jones Jr., (born 1981), murdered his five children in Lexington County, South Carolina
- Tim Jones (RAF officer), senior officer in the Royal Air Force
- Timothy Paul Jones (born 1973), American evangelical scholar of apologetics and family ministry

== See also ==
- Timothy Clement-Jones, Baron Clement-Jones (born 1949), Liberal Democrat peer and spokesman for Culture, Media and Sport
