= Andy Poole =

Andy Poole may refer to:

- Andy Poole (footballer) (born 1960), English former footballer
- Andy Poole (bassist), musician with Big Big Train

== See also ==
- Andrew Poole, (born 1967), English former footballer
