= Matthew Kay =

Matthew Kay may refer to:

- Matty Kay (born 1989), English footballer
- Matthew Kay (cricketer) (born 1982), English cricketer
