= Andrew Poole =

English cricketer

Personal information
- Full name: Andrew Keith Poole
- Born: 2 July 1967 (age 59); Middlesbrough, Yorkshire, England
- Batting: Right-handed
- Bowling: Right-arm fast-medium

Domestic team information
- Years: Team
- 2000–2001: Suffolk

Career statistics
Competition	List A
Matches	2
Runs scored	0
Batting average	0.00
100s/50s	–/–
Top score	0
Balls bowled	47
Wickets	2
Bowling average	13.50
5 wickets in innings	–
10 wickets in match	–
Best bowling	1/13
Catches/stumpings	1/–
- Source: Cricinfo, 28 July 2011

Andrew Keith Poole (born 2 July 1967) is a former English cricketer. Poole was a right-handed batsman who bowled right-arm fast-medium. He was born in Middlesbrough, Yorkshire.

Poole made his debut for Suffolk in the 2000 Minor Counties Championship against Norfolk. Poole played a further Minor Counties Championship match in 2001, against Lincolnshire. He also made 2 MCCA Knockout Trophy appearances in 2001, against the Essex Cricket Board and Hertfordshire. He made his List A debut against the Essex Cricket Board in the 2nd round of the 2001 Cheltenham & Gloucester Trophy. In this match, he took the wicket of Andrew Churchill for the cost of 14 runs from 5 overs, while with the bat he wasn't required as Suffolk ran out winners by 6 wickets. He made his second List A appearance against Nottinghamshire in the 3rd round of the same competition. In this match he was dismissed for a duck by Richard Logan, while with the ball he took the wicket of Guy Welton for the cost of 13 runs from 2.5 overs. This was the only wicket to fall in Nottinghamshire's innings, with Nottinghamshire winning by 9 wickets.
