= Royston Smith (cricketer) =

English cricketer

Personal information
- Full name: Royston Anthony Smith
- Born: 14 March 1974 (age 52); Romford, London, England
- Batting: Right-handed
- Bowling: Right-arm medium

Domestic team information
- Years: Team
- 2000–2002: Essex Cricket Board

Career statistics
Competition	LA
Matches	3
Runs scored	27
Batting average	9.00
100s/50s	–/–
Top score	11
Balls bowled	–
Wickets	–
Bowling average	–
5 wickets in innings	–
10 wickets in match	–
Best bowling	–
Catches/stumpings	1/–
- Source: Cricinfo, 7 November 2010

Royston Anthony Smith (born 14 March 1974) is an English cricketer. Smith is a right-handed batsman who bowls right-arm medium pace. He was born in Romford, London.

Smith represented the Essex Cricket Board in 3 List A matches. These came against Warwickshire in the 2000 NatWest Trophy, Suffolk in the 2001 Cheltenham & Gloucester Trophy and the Surrey Cricket Board in the 2nd round of the 2003 Cheltenham & Gloucester Trophy which was played in 2002. In his 3 List A matches, he scored 27 runs at a batting average of 9.00, with a high score of 11. In the field he took a single catch.

He currently plays club cricket for Ardleigh Green Cricket Club in the Essex Premier League.
