= Brendan Smith =

Brendan Smith may refer to:

- Brendan Smith (politician) (born 1956), Irish Fianna Fáil politician, TD and government minister
- Brendan Powell Smith (born 1973), American artist and author
- Brendan Smith (cricketer) (born 1985), English cricketer
- Brendan Smith (ice hockey) (born 1989), Canadian ice hockey defenceman
- Brendan Smith (EastEnders), fictional character
- Brendan J. Smith (born 1942), see List of taxonomic authorities named Smith

== See also ==
- Brandon Smith (disambiguation)
- Brendan Smyth (1927–1997), Roman Catholic priest
- Brendan Smyth (politician) (born 1959), Australian politician
