= Andrew Kennedy (cricketer, born 1975) =

English cricketer

Personal information
- Full name: Andrew Kennedy
- Born: 10 January 1975 (age 51); Colchester, Essex, England
- Batting: Right-handed
- Bowling: Right-arm medium-fast

Domestic team information
- Years: Team
- 2001–2003: Essex Cricket Board

Career statistics
| Competition | LA |
|---|---|
| Matches | 3 |
| Runs scored | 72 |
| Batting average | 24.00 |
| 100s/50s | –/– |
| Top score | 27 |
| Balls bowled | 36 |
| Wickets | 1 |
| Bowling average | 37.00 |
| 5 wickets in innings | – |
| 10 wickets in match | – |
| Best bowling | 1/37 |
| Catches/stumpings | 2/– |
- Source: Cricinfo, 8 November 2010

Andrew Kennedy (born 10 January 1975) is an English cricketer. Kennedy is a right-handed batsman who bowls right-arm medium-fast. He was born in Colchester, Essex.

Kennedy represented the Essex Cricket Board in three List A matches. These came against the Sussex Cricket Board in the first round of the 2002 Cheltenham & Gloucester Trophy held in 2001, against the Surrey Cricket Board in the second round of the 2003 Cheltenham & Gloucester Trophy held in 2002, and against Essex in the 3rd round of the same competition, played in 2003. In his three List A matches, he scored 72 runs at a batting average of 24.00, with a high score of 27. In the field he took two catches. With the ball, he took a single wicket at a cost of 37 runs.

He currently plays club cricket for Colchester and East Essex Cricket Club in the Essex Premier League.
