= Alex Richards =

Alex Richards may refer to:

- Alex Richards (cricketer)
- Alex Richards (journalist)
