= Utkarsh =

Utkarsh (Hindi: उत्कर्ष) is a given name of Hindi and Indian origin primarily for males and meaning prosperity, awakening, development and flourishing.

== People named Utkarsh ==
- Utkarsh Ambudkar, American actor
- Utkarsh Bhaskar, Indian cricketer
- Utkarsh Chandra, Indian cricketer
- Utkarsh Sharma, Indian actor
- Utkarsh Singh, Indian cricketer
- Utkarsh Verma, Indian politician
- Utkarsh raj chaturvedi, Indian accountant
