= Buckham =

Buckham may refer to:

- Alfred Buckham (1879–1956), British photographer
- Craig Buckham (born 1983), English cricketer
- Ed Buckham, American politician
- Hazel Buckham (1888–1959), American silent film actress
- John Andrew Buckham (1873–1931), Canadian politician in British Columbia

== See also ==
- Thomas Scott Buckham Memorial Library, American historic library in Minnesota
- James Buckham Kennedy (1844–1930), Canadian politician in British Columbia
