= Christine Williams =

Christine Williams may refer to:

- Christine Williams (model) (1945–2017), English model and actor
- Christine Williams (nutritionist), English professor and university pro-vice-chancellor
- Christine Williams (sociologist), American sociologist
- Christine Douglass-Williams, also known as Christine Williams, Canadian blogger at Jihad Watch

== Fictional characters ==
- Christine Williams (Tangle), fictional character on Tangle
- Christine Blair, née Christine Williams, fictional character on The Young and the Restless
- Chrissie Williams, Christine Williams, a fictional character on Holby City

== See also ==
- Chris Williams (disambiguation)
- Christina Williams, American murder victim
