= Simon Moore =

Simon Moore may refer to:

- Simon Moore (Royal Navy officer) (born 1946), former Royal Navy officer and former Assistant Chief of Defence Staff
- Simon Moore (judge), see Pitcairn sexual assault trial of 2004
- Simon Moore (writer) (fl. 1990s), British screenplay writer
- Simon Moore (footballer) (born 1990), English football (soccer) goalkeeper
- Simon Moore (Derbyshire cricketer) (born 1974), former English cricketer, played for Derbyshire in 1999 and 2003
- Simon Moore (Essex cricketer) (born 1973), English cricketer, played for Essex 2000–01
