= Rory Ellison =

Irish cricketer

Personal information
- Full name: David Rory Ellison
- Born: 22 October 1980 (age 46); Belfast, County Antrim, Northern Ireland
- Batting: Right-handed
- Bowling: Right-arm off break

Domestic team information
- Years: Team
- 2001: Essex Cricket Board

Career statistics
Competition	LA
Matches	1
Runs scored	0
Batting average	0.00
100s/50s	–/–
Top score	0
Balls bowled	54
Wickets	1
Bowling average	48.00
5 wickets in innings	–
10 wickets in match	–
Best bowling	1/48
Catches/stumpings	–/–
- Source: Cricinfo, 7 November 2010

David Rory Ellison (born 22 October 1980) is an Irish cricketer. Ellison is a right-handed batsman who bowls right-arm off break. He was born in Belfast, Northern Ireland.

Ellsion represented the Essex Cricket Board in a single List A match against the Sussex Cricket Board in the 1st round of the 2002 Cheltenham & Gloucester Trophy which was held in 2001. In his only List A match, he took a single wicket at a cost of 48 runs.

He currently plays club cricket for Woodford Wells Cricket Club in the Essex Premier League.
