= John Chambers (English cricketer) =

English cricketer (born 1971)

Personal information
- Full name: John Edward Chambers
- Born: 23 October 1971 (age 55); Barking, London, England
- Batting: Right-handed
- Bowling: Right-arm medium-fast

Domestic team information
- Years: Team
- 2001: Essex Cricket Board

Career statistics
Competition	LA
Matches	1
Runs scored	0
Batting average	0.00
100s/50s	–/–
Top score	0
Balls bowled	24
Wickets	–
Bowling average	–
5 wickets in innings	–
10 wickets in match	–
Best bowling	–
Catches/stumpings	–/–
- Source: Cricinfo, 7 November 2010

John Edward Chambers (born 23 October 1971) is an English cricketer. Chambers is a right-handed batsman who bowls right-arm medium-fast. He was born in Barking, London.and is now a primary school teacher

Chambers represented the Essex Cricket Board in a single List A match against the Sussex Cricket Board in the 1st round of the 2002 Cheltenham & Gloucester Trophy which was held in 2001.

He currently plays club cricket for Wanstead Cricket Club in the Essex Premier League.
