= Chris Williams (pornographic film actor) =

American actor and model (1967–1991)

- Born: Todd Dunning Bart; December 22, 1967; Fairfax County, Virginia, U.S.
- Died: September 11, 1991 (aged 23); Miami, Florida, U.S.
- Other name: Todd Bart
- Occupations: Actor; model; dancer
- Years active: 1985–1991
- Agent: Falcon Studios

Chris Williams (born Todd Dunning Bart; December 22, 1967 – September 11, 1991) was an American adult film actor and model active during the 1980s. Known for his blond hair and "boy-next-door" appearance, he became a prominent performer in gay adult cinema during its video transition era and profiled for various adult publications. His career concluded abruptly following a 1989 law enforcement sting operation in Washington, D.C., which subsequently influenced institutional reforms within the Metropolitan Police Department and prompted revision of local law enforcement practices.

== Early life ==
Todd Dunning Bart was born in Fairfax County, Virginia, on December 22, 1967. Following domestic difficulties and a strained relationship with his parents, he was sent to reside with his grandmother in North Carolina at age eight. By age 14, Bart had run away and relocated to Washington, D.C., where he experienced homelessness and engaged in survival sex work. At age 16, utilizing falsified identification to obscure his status as a minor, he began working as a dancer and stripper at local gay adult venues, including the Chesapeake House and Shooters.

=== Legal case ===
During his youth, Bart’s status as a runaway juvenile became central to the federal appellate court case United States v. Monaghan, 741 F.2d 1434 (D.C. Cir. 1984). The case involved Eric Monaghan, a Metropolitan Police Department officer who had sheltered Bart while knowing his runaway status. Monaghan was subsequently convicted of sexual misconduct and taking indecent liberties with a minor. The subsequent appeal touched upon the transport of minors across state lines and prosecutorial conduct during closing arguments, remaining a frequently cited legal precedent regarding the boundaries of permissible prosecutorial rhetoric.

== Career ==
=== Modeling ===
Shortly after his eighteenth birthday in late 1985, Bart entered the commercial adult entertainment industry, adopting the pseudonym Chris Williams. Alongside film work, Williams became a prolific physique model for gay adult periodicals. His imagery was featured in photography layouts for national publications including Mandate, Torso, and In Touch.

=== Acting ===
Williams performed as a contract and freelance actor for several prominent adult film studios, primarily Falcon Studios and Catalina Video. He entered the field during a period of market expansion for home video adult media, gaining traction for his versatility and aesthetic appeal.

Williams achieved significant commercial popularity within the genre after appearing in productions for Falcon Studios, then considered a leading brand in the adult video industry. His first major role for the studio occurred in the 1987 feature Out of Bounds. This was followed by Perfect Summer (1988), which contained a prominently cited poolside sequence alongside performer Randy Paul.

In 1988, Williams appeared in the Sierra Pacific feature Bare Tales, performing alongside established actor Jim Pulver. The same year, he performed in Spokes II: The Graduation with Jim Bentley and Casey Jordan. In 1989, Williams starred in the Catalina Video military-themed production The Young Cadets, directed by Cameron Leight. Over the course of his active years, Williams performed in numerous video features.

=== 1989 Washington, D.C. scandal ===
Williams' professional career ended in 1989 when he was detained during a Metropolitan Police Department (MPD) sting operation aimed at an organized metropolitan escort and "call-boy" network. Because records demonstrated that Williams had been under the legal age of majority during several prior encounters with clients in the District of Columbia area, law enforcement personnel leveraged the prospect of a severe custodial sentence at the Lorton Reformatory to compel his state's evidence.

Under prolonged interrogation and psychological duress, Williams accepted an immunity agreement in exchange for providing grand jury testimony identifying and implicating dozens of his former clients. The resulting prosecutions and public disclosures generated significant friction within the local gay community. Williams faced immediate professional blacklisting from the adult venues that had formerly employed him, resulting in the loss of his social and financial networks.

The public controversy surrounding the tactics utilized in the sting operation, alongside allegations of systemic police harassment targeting gay residents, mobilized local political activists. The fallout from the scandal directly accelerated the 1990 establishment of the Gay and Lesbian Liaison Unit (GLLU) within the Metropolitan Police Department, an initiative designed to reform relations, manage biases, and protect the civil rights of LGBTQ+ citizens within the District.

=== Later life ===
By mid-1990, Williams had been diagnosed with HIV/AIDS. Facing sudden financial destitution and declining physical health, he left Washington, D.C., and relocated to Miami, Florida, seeking a milder climate to accommodate his medical condition.

During the terminal stage of his illness, Williams participated in an extensive series of videotaped depositions, totaling over 100 hours of recorded testimony. In these statements, Williams formally recanted the testimonies he had previously provided to federal and district prosecutors. He detailed specific instances of coercion, stating that law enforcement officials had manipulated his statements and exploited his legal vulnerability under threat of imprisonment. These recorded depositions were subsequently introduced by defense attorneys in appellate proceedings, successfully contributing to the reduction, modification, or reversal of criminal convictions for several individuals targeted in the original 1989 sting operation.

== Death ==
Williams died from AIDS-related complications at Jackson Memorial Hospital in Miami on September 11, 1991, at the age of 23.

== Filmography ==
=== Film ===
Year	Title	Role	Notes
1987	Out of Bounds	The Hiker	Debut
1988	Spokes 2: The Graduation	Student	Falcon Studios
1988	Bare Tales	Chris	Tyger Films
1988	The Young Cadets	Cadet	Catalina Video
1988	Perfect Summer	Blonde	Falcon Studios
1988	My Best Buddy: Top of the Pack	Joey	Catalina Video
1991	The Best of Kurt Bauer	Chris Williams	
1995	Catalina Bonds	Chris	Posthumous released
1997	Military Men	Soldier	Posthumous released
2000	Poolside Sex	Chris Williams	Posthumous released
2002	Young Men of the 80's 2	Chris	Posthumous released
2008	Best of the 1980s 1	Chris Williams	Posthumous released
2009	Best of the 1980s 2	Chris	Posthumous released
2010	Cops on Duty	Chris	Posthumous released
2010	Rites of Initiation	Chris	Posthumous released
2011	Bed Head	Chris	Posthumous released
2011	Falcon 40th Anniversary Collector's Edition	Chris	Posthumous released
2011	The Best of Chad Douglas	Chris	Posthumous released
2011	Fuck Me Raw 1	Chris	Posthumous released
2012	Do It for Daddy	Chris	Posthumous released
2013	Loads of Leather	Chris	Posthumous released
2013	Riveting Raw Threeways!	Chris	Posthumous released
2013	Explode in My Hole	Chris	Posthumous released
2021	Falcon Icons: The 1980s	Chris	Posthumous released
2025	Bareback Classics 3	Chris Williams	Posthumous released

== Legacy and Memorial ==
To honor his life and struggle, he is memorialized on the AIDS Memorial Quilt, a tribute to those lost to the epidemic that continues to share his story with future generations.

== Notes ==
- Douglas, Jerry (1992). Manshots Vol. 4 No. 4 (Fade Out: Chris Williams Obituary). FirstHand, Ltd. OCLC 30846924.
