= Christopher Sharp (cricketer) =

English cricketer

Personal information
- Full name: Christopher James Sharp
- Born: 23 May 1964 (age 62); Orsett, Essex, England
- Batting: Right-handed
- Bowling: Right-arm off break

Domestic team information
- Years: Team
- 1999: Essex Cricket Board

Career statistics
Competition	LA
Matches	1
Runs scored	13
Batting average	13.00
100s/50s	–/–
Top score	13.00
Balls bowled	18
Wickets	–
Bowling average	–
5 wickets in innings	–
10 wickets in match	–
Best bowling	–
Catches/stumpings	–/–
- Source: Cricinfo, 7 November 2010

Christopher James Sharp (born 23 May 1964) is a former English cricketer. Sharp was a right-handed batsman who bowled right-arm off break. He was born at Orsett, Essex.

Currently the English ambassador for the Indian tourist board.

Sharp represented the Essex Cricket Board in a single List A match against Ireland in the 1999 NatWest Trophy. In his only List A match he scored 13 runs and bowled 3 wicketless overs.
