= Christopher White (technician) =

17th-century chemist and laboratory technician

Christopher White (c. 1650–1695?) was a chemist and laboratory technician based in London and Oxford. He was selected to run one of the first purpose built university laboratories in the UK and has been referred to as the "first professional technician".

== Career ==
White's father acted as an assistant to Peter Stahl, a German alchemist, when he gave an experimental chemistry course in Oxford. White helped his father on that course and then remained working as a trainee assistant to Stahl for three years. He then worked for Robert Boyle in Oxford and London for a further ten years.

Returning to Oxford in 1676 White set up a successful business making chemical medicines and preparations. White was invited to run a new chemical laboratory that was to be built as part of the Ashmolean Museum at the University of Oxford. Begun in 1679, the new laboratory was opened on 21 May 1683 and was described by Edward Chamberlayne as:

Perchance one of the most beautiful and useful in the World, furnished with all sorts of Furnaces, and all other necessary Materials in order to use and practise.

White's role was to demonstrate experiments and techniques as part of a lecture series given by Robert Plot and later Edward Hannes.

White also continued his business making chemical medicines and preparations running a public dispensary. He was acquainted with John Aubrey and is mentioned in Aubrey's letters. In 1689 Aubrey refers to "a rare medicine that he [White] hath for the stone".

White worked at the laboratory until he retired.

== Personal life ==
White had a wife, two sons, and two daughters. White had trained both sons as chemist apothecaries and the older son, Christopher, succeeded to White's university post.
