= Ian Flanagan (cricketer) =

English cricketer (born 1980)

Personal information
- Full name: Ian Nicholas Flanagan
- Born: 5 June 1980 (age 46); Colchester, Essex, England
- Batting: Left-handed
- Bowling: Right-arm off break

Domestic team information
- Years: Team
- 2002-2006: Cambridgeshire
- 2001: Essex Cricket Board
- 1997-2000: Essex

Career statistics
Competition	FC	LA
Matches	18	3
Runs scored	580	86
Batting average	18.70	28.66
100s/50s	–/3	–/–
Top score	61	45
Balls bowled	93	48
Wickets	1	–
Bowling average	51.00	–
5 wickets in innings	–	–
10 wickets in match	–	–
Best bowling	1/50	–
Catches/stumpings	19/–	–/–
- Source: Cricinfo, 7 November 2010

Ian Nicholas Flanagan (born 5 June 1980) is an English cricketer. Flanagan is a left-handed batsman who bowls right-arm off break. He was born at Colchester, Essex.

Flanagan made his first-class debut for Essex against Warwickshire in the 1997 County Championship. From 1997 to 2000, he represented the county in 18 first-class matches, the last of which came against Middlesex. In his 18 first-class matches, he scored 580 runs at a batting average of 18.70, with 3 half centuries and a high score of 61. In the field he took 19 catches. With the ball he took a single wicket at a bowling average of 51.00, with best figures of 1/50.

Flanagan made his debut in List A cricket for the Essex Cricket Board against Suffolk in the 2001 Cheltenham & Gloucester Trophy.

In 2002, he joined Cambridgeshire. His debut in the Minor Counties Championship came against Buckinghamshire. From 2002 to 2004, he represented the county in 8 Championship matches, the last of which came against Bedfordshire. Flanagan's debut in the MCCA Knockout Trophy for Cambridgeshire came against Cumberland in 2004. From 2004 to 2006, he played 5 Trophy matches for the county, the last of which came against Hertfordshire. Flanagan played 2 List A matches for the county against the Middlesex Cricket Board in the 2nd round of the 2003 Cheltenham & Gloucester Trophy which was played in 2002, and against Northamptonshire in the 2004 Cheltenham & Gloucester Trophy. In his 3 List A matches, he scored 86 runs at an average of 28.66, with a high score of 45.
