= Andrew Churchill =

English cricketer

Personal information
- Full name: Andrew John Churchill
- Born: 27 November 1970 (age 55); Hornchurch, London, England
- Batting: Right-handed
- Bowling: Left-arm medium

Domestic team information
- Years: Team
- 1999–2001: Essex Cricket Board

Career statistics
Competition	LA
Matches	4
Runs scored	19
Batting average	4.75
100s/50s	–/–
Top score	10
Balls bowled	210
Wickets	5
Bowling average	29.00
5 wickets in innings	–
10 wickets in match	–
Best bowling	2/32
Catches/stumpings	2/–
- Source: Cricinfo, 7 November 2010

Andrew John Churchill (born 27 November 1970) is an English cricketer. Churchill is a right-handed batsman who bowls left-arm medium pace. He was born in Hornchurch in Greater London

Churchill represented the Essex Cricket Board in List A cricket. His debut List A match came against Ireland in the 1999 NatWest Trophy. From 1999 to 2001, he represented the Board in 4 List A matches, the last of which came against Suffolk in the 2001 Cheltenham & Gloucester Trophy. In his 4 List A matches, he scored 19 runs at a batting average of 4.75, with a high score of 10. In the field he took a single catch. With the ball he took 5 wickets at a bowling average of 29.00, with best figures of 2/32.

He currently plays club cricket for Gidea Park and Romford Cricket Club in the Essex Premier League.
