= William King (poet) =

English poet

William King (1663–1712) was an English poet.

== Life ==
Born in London, England, the son of Ezekiel King, he was related to the family of Edward Hyde, 1st Earl of Clarendon. From Westminster School, where he was a scholar under Richard Busby, at the age of 18, he was elected to Christ Church, Oxford, in 1681. There, he is said to have dedicated himself completely to his studies. Reportedly, after eight years, he had read over 22,000 books and manuscripts, a figure reduced to about 7,000 in seven years by Thomas Young.

In 1688, he graduated with an M.A. Taking up the civil law, he became a doctor in 1692 and was admitted as an advocate at Doctors' Commons. In 1702, having moved to Ireland, he was made Judge of the Admiralty, Commissioner of the Prizes, Keeper of the Records in Birmingham's Tower, and Vicar-General to Narcissus Marsh, the primate. King found a friend in Anthony Upton, one of the High Court judges, who had a house called Mountown, near Dublin, where King frequently stayed. Both men were severely criticised by their political opponents for neglecting their official duties; it was said that they had no ambition but to live out their days in rural retirement.

In 1708, when Lord Wharton was sent to govern Ireland, the King returned to London.

In 1710, he became a supporter of the High Church party, on the side of Henry Sacheverell, and was supposed to have had some part in setting up The Examiner. He was suspicious of the operations of Whiggism, and he criticised White Kennet's adulatory sermon at the funeral of the Duke of Devonshire.

In the autumn of 1712, King's health declined, and he died on Christmas Day.

== Works ==
In 1688, King published Reflections upon Mons Varillas's History of Heresy, written with Edward Hannes, a confutation of Antoine Varillas's account of John Wycliffe. He had already made some translations from the French language and written some humorous and satirical pieces

In 1694, Molesworth published his Account of Denmark, in which he treated the Danes and their monarch with great contempt. This book offended Prince George of Denmark, the consort of Queen Anne, and the Danish Minister protested and King responded back in a counter pamphlet, Animadversions on the Pretended Account of Denmark accusing Moleswoth while he was ambassador of poaching on royal estates and drivign down a road exclusively reserved for the Danish King. Much of the material was supplied by Mogens Skeel the Danish ambassador and Prince George obtained an appointment for King as secretary to the Princess Anne.

In 1699, he published A Journey to London, following the method of Dr. Martin Lister, who had published A Journey to Paris. And in 1700, he satirised the Royal Society—or at least, Sir Hans Sloane, their president—in two dialogues entitled The Transactioner. At Mountown, the home of his friend Mr Justice Upton, he wrote the poem Mully of Mountown.

Back in London, King published some essays called Useful Transactions, including Voyage to the Island of Cajamai. He then wrote the Art of Love, a poem, and in 1709 he imitated Horace in an Art of Cookery, which he published with some letters to Lister. The same year he published three issues of philosophical parodies under the title Useful Transactions in Philosophy and Other Sorts of Learning. The History of the Heathen Gods, a book composed for schools, was written in 1711. The same year, he published Rufinus, a historical essay and a political poem on the Duke of Marlborough and his adherents.

== Notes ==
Attribution
