= Chris White (cricketer) =

English cricketer

Personal information
- Full name: Christopher Charles E White
- Born: 15 March 1980 (age 46); Epping, Essex, England
- Batting: Right-handed
- Bowling: Right-arm medium

Domestic team information
- Years: Team
- 2002: Essex Cricket Board

Career statistics
Competition	LA
Matches	1
Runs scored	–
Batting average	–
100s/50s	–/–
Top score	–
Balls bowled	60
Wickets	2
Bowling average	17
5 wickets in innings	–
10 wickets in match	–
Best bowling	2/34
Catches/stumpings	–/–
- Source: Cricinfo, 7 November 2010

Christopher 'Chris' Charles E White (born 15 February 1980) is an English cricketer. White is a right-handed batsman who bowls right-arm medium pace. He was born at Epping, Essex.

White represented the Essex Cricket Board in a single List A match against the Surrey Cricket Board in the 2nd round of the 2003 Cheltenham & Gloucester Trophy which was held in 2002. In his only List A match, he took 2 wickets at a bowling average of 17.00, with figures of 2/34.

He currently plays club cricket for Fives and Heronians Cricket Club in the Essex Premier League.
