= Andrew Hibbert =

English cricketer

Personal information
- Full name: Andrew James Edward Hibbert
- Born: 17 December 1974 (age 51); Harold Wood, London, England
- Batting: Right-handed
- Bowling: Right-arm medium
- Role: Occasional wicketkeeper

Domestic team information
- Years: Team
- 1999–2001: Essex Cricket Board
- 1995–1998: Essex

Career statistics
Competition	FC	LA
Matches	7	12
Runs scored	236	170
Batting average	21.45	17.00
100s/50s	–/1	–/1
Top score	85	59
Balls bowled	105	18
Wickets	3	–
Bowling average	16.33	–
5 wickets in innings	–	–
10 wickets in match	–	–
Best bowling	3/16	–
Catches/stumpings	5/–	3/–
- Source: Cricinfo, 7 November 2010

Andrew James Edward Hibbert (born 17 December 1974) is a former English cricketer. Hibbert was a right-handed batsman who bowled right-arm medium pace. He was born in Harold Wood, London.

Hibbert made his first-class debut for Essex against Cambridge University in the 1995 season. From 1995 to 1998, he represented the county in 7 first-class matches, the last of which came against Hampshire. In his 7 first-class matches, he scored 236 runs at a batting average of 21.45, with a single half century high score of 85. In the field he took 5 catches. With the ball he took 3 wickets at a bowling average of 16.33, with best figures of 3/16.

It was for Essex that he made his debut in List A cricket, which came against Leicestershire in the 1996 AXA Equity League. From 1996 to 1998, he represented the county in 8 List A matches, the last of which came against the touring South Africans.

Hibbert later played List A cricket for the Essex Cricket Board, making his debut against Ireland in the 1999 NatWest Trophy. From 1999 to 2001, he represented the Board in 4 List A matches, the last of which came against Suffolk in the 2001 Cheltenham & Gloucester Trophy. In his career total of 12 List A matches, he scored 170 runs at an average of 17.00, with a single half century high score of 59. In the field he took 3 catches.
