= Christopher Whyte (disambiguation) =

Christopher or Chris Whyte may refer to:

- Christopher Whyte (born 1952), Scottish writer
- Chris Whyte (born 1961), English footballer

== See also ==
- Christopher White (disambiguation)
- Christopher Wight (born 1959), cricketer from the Cayman Islands
