= Kris Williams =

Kris Williams may refer to:

- Kris Williams, investigator and researcher on Syfy's Ghost Hunters International
- Kris Swanberg (born 1980), an American filmmaker who has also been credited as Kris Williams

== See also ==
- Christopher Williams (disambiguation)
- Chris Williams (disambiguation)
