= Simon Fitzgerald =

English cricketer

Personal information
- Full name: Simon David Fitzgerald
- Born: 6 December 1966 (age 59); Ilford, London, England
- Batting: Left-handed
- Role: Wicketkeeper

Domestic team information
- Years: Team
- 1999–2001: Essex Cricket Board

Career statistics
Competition	LA
Matches	4
Runs scored	40
Batting average	10.00
100s/50s	–/–
Top score	19
Balls bowled	–
Wickets	–
Bowling average	–
5 wickets in innings	–
10 wickets in match	–
Best bowling	–
Catches/stumpings	2/1
- Source: Cricinfo, 7 November 2010

Simon David Fitzgerald (born 6 December 1966) is a former English cricketer. Fitzgerald was a left-handed batsman who played primarily as a wicketkeeper. He was born in Ilford, London.

Fitzgerald represented the Essex Cricket Board in List A cricket. His debut List A match came against Ireland in the 1999 NatWest Trophy. From 1999 to 2001, he represented the Board in 4 List A matches, the last of which came against Suffolk in the 2001 Cheltenham & Gloucester Trophy. In his 4 List A matches, he scored 40 runs at a batting average of 10.00, with a high score of 19. Behind the stumps he took 2 catches and made a single stumping.
