= Adrian Shankar =

English cricketer

Personal information
- Full name: Adrian Anton Shankar
- Born: 7 May 1982 (age 44); Ascot, Berkshire
- Batting: Right-handed
- Bowling: Right-arm off break

Domestic team information
- Years: Team
- 2000–2006: Bedfordshire
- 2002–2005: Cambridge UCCE
- 2002–2005: Cambridge University
- 2011: Worcestershire

Career statistics
Competition	First-class	List A
Matches	13	2
Runs scored	394	27
Batting average	19.70	13.50
100s/50s	1/0	0/0
Top score	143	27
Catches/stumpings	5/–	0/–
- Source: Cricinfo, 18 June 2011

Adrian Anton Shankar (born 7 May 1982) is an English former cricketer most known for being released by Worcestershire County Cricket Club, having been discovered to have lied about his age and achievements in order to gain a professional contract. He subsequently did not appear again in professional cricket.

== Early career ==
Shankar was a right-handed batsman and occasional off-spin bowler. He was born at Ascot, Berkshire and educated at Bedford School. After leaving Bedford School, where he had played cricket for the school alongside Alastair Cook, following his A Levels in 2000, Shankar proceeded to read law at Cambridge University. It was for the university cricket club that he made his first-class debut against Middlesex in 2002. Shankar played first-class cricket for the university from 2002 to 2005, playing his final first-class match against Oxford University, while on occasion he captained the university. Shankar played 12 first-class matches for the university, scoring 384 runs at an average of 27.42. His one innings of note came against Oxford University in 2002, when he scored 143 runs from 297 balls, before being dismissed by Stephen Hawinkels. This was Shankar's only first-class century and was the only time he passed fifty. The bowling in the match was later described by Cambridge University coach Chris Scott as "utterly bad".

Shankar made his debut for Bedfordshire while still at Bedford School, making his debut against Norfolk in the 2000 Minor Counties Championship. Between 2000 and 2006, Shankar played infrequently for Bedfordshire, making 21 Minor Counties Championship appearances and 2 MCCA Knockout Trophy appearances, which came in 2006. It was for Bedfordshire that he made his List A debut, against Sussex in the 2005 Cheltenham & Gloucester Trophy at Wardown Park. He was dismissed in this match by Jason Lewry for 27 runs, which was the second highest score in Bedfordshire's innings. During this period, he played Second XI cricket for the Middlesex Second XI, Worcestershire Second XI and Sussex Second XI. However his career was interrupted for 18 months when he suffered from glandular fever.

After representing the Lancashire Second XI in 2008, Shankar was given a two-year contract with Lancashire. Lancashire cricket coach, Mike Watkinson, stated "Adrian is a quality young batsman who fills a gap in our player development programme. He has attracted interest from a number of other counties which confirms his potential". While on the Lancashire staff, Shankar chose to study part-time for a two-year masters course in international relations, also at Cambridge. It fitted in with Shankar's ambition to play cricket for Lancashire as the course required that he only had to be in Cambridge for six weeks of the year. However, Shankar failed to impress and did not play for Lancashire's first team.

== Worcestershire ==
While supposedly playing cricket in Sri Lanka in the "Sri Lankan Mercantile League" (later discovered to be a fictional competition likely invented by Shankar himself) he came to the attention of Worcestershire, and he signed a contract with the injury hit club in May 2011. Shankar was put straight into the Worcestershire first team, making his debut for the county in the Clydesdale Bank 40 against Middlesex, in what would be his only List A appearance for the team. In this match he opened the batting with Moeen Ali, but was dismissed for a duck by Tim Murtagh. He made a single first-class appearance for the county, which came against Durham. He scored 10 unbeaten runs in Worcestershire's first-innings, before retiring hurt with a strained cruciate ligament which was set to rule him out for six weeks.

Two weeks after signing for his new county, his claims that he was three years younger than his actual age and that he had enjoyed a successful season playing high level cricket in Sri Lanka turned out to be false. Shankar was immediately released from his contract. The cricket he played in Sri Lanka was played at a minor level, with scorecards of the series not appearing on respected archiving websites such as CricketArchive and Cricinfo, a fact it appears Worcestershire failed to check. In light of this, the England and Wales Cricket Board asked Bedfordshire, for whom he was still registered to play Minor counties cricket, to remove him from their list of eligible players. Worcestershire also passed his registration documents to West Mercia Police, who later decided not to pursue criminal charges.

Shankar's deception had begun at Lancashire, with Shankar claiming his age was 23. Upon his signing with the county, Lancashire released a press statement which stated the Cambridge University coach referring to him as one of the finest young players the university side had seen since John Crawley. Chris Scott contacted Lancashire to deny having made such a claim, saying "I phoned Lancashire and made it clear that I'd never said anything of the sort", before going on to say "He was a poor player and there's no way I would have recommended him." In response to the situation, Bedfordshire president Mike Green had to say "Frankly we [Bedfordshire] were amazed when we found out he was signing for Worcestershire because he would have struggled to get into our side. He hadn’t been good enough to get into our first XI for a good six or seven years."
