= Tom Colverd =

English cricketer (born 1995)

Personal information
- Born: 13 November 1995 (age 30); Tokyo, Japan
- Source: Cricinfo, 18 April 2017

Tom Colverd (born 13 November 1995) is an English cricketer. He played six first-class matches for Cambridge University Cricket Club between 2016 and 2018.

== See also ==
- List of Cambridge University Cricket Club players
- List of Cambridge UCCE & MCCU players
