= Brandon Smith =

Brandon Smith may refer to:

- Brandon Smith (ice hockey) (born 1973), Canadian ice hockey player
- Brandon Smith (defensive back, born 1984) (born 1984), Canadian football player
- Brandon Smith (defensive back, born 1987) (born 1987), American football cornerback
- Brandon Smith (wide receiver) (born 1998), American wide receiver
- Brandon Smith (linebacker) (born 2001), American football linebacker
- Brandon Smith (running back), American football running back
- Brandon Smith (rugby league) (born 1996), New Zealand rugby league player
- Brandon Mychal Smith (born 1989), American actor
- Brandon Smith, Los Angeles based musician, producer and the creator of The Anix, former member of Apoptygma Berzerk
- Brandon Smith (politician) (born 1967), American

== See also ==
- Brendan Smith (disambiguation)
