= Jamie Went =

English cricketer

Personal information
- Full name: James Colin Went
- Born: 7 January 1982 (age 44); Reading, Berkshire, England
- Batting: Left-handed
- Bowling: Right-arm medium

Domestic team information
- Years: Team
- 2003: Essex Cricket Board

Career statistics
Competition	LA
Matches	1
Runs scored	1
Batting average	1.00
100s/50s	–/–
Top score	1
Balls bowled	60
Wickets	1
Bowling average	64.00
5 wickets in innings	–
10 wickets in match	–
Best bowling	1/64
Catches/stumpings	–/–
- Source: Cricinfo, 7 November 2010

James Colin Went (born 7 January 1982) is an English cricketer. Went is a left-handed batsman who bowls right-arm medium pace. He was born at Reading, Berkshire.

Went represented the Essex Cricket Board in a single List A match against Essex in the 2003 Cheltenham & Gloucester Trophy. In his only List A match, he scored a single run and with the ball he took a single wicket at a cost of 64 runs from 10 overs.

He currently plays club cricket for Hornchurch Cricket Club.
