= Jamie Sparrow =

English cricketer

Personal information
- Full name: Jamie Sparrow
- Born: 22 January 1971 (age 55); Bishop's Stortford, Hertfordshire, England
- Nickname: Spazmo
- Batting: Right-handed
- Bowling: Right-arm fast-medium

Domestic team information
- Years: Team
- 1999: Essex Cricket Board

Career statistics
Competition	LA
Matches	1
Runs scored	–
Batting average	–
100s/50s	–/–
Top score	–
Balls bowled	54
Wickets	2
Bowling average	21.00
5 wickets in innings	–
10 wickets in match	–
Best bowling	2/42
Catches/stumpings	–/–
- Source: Cricinfo, 7 November 2010

Jamie Sparrow (born 22 January 1971) is an English cricketer. Sparrow is a right-handed batsman who bowls right-arm fast-medium. He was born at Bishop's Stortford, Hertfordshire.

In 1997, Sparrow played a single Minor Counties Championship match for Cambridgeshire against Bedfordshire. He later represented the Essex Cricket Board in a single List A match against Ireland in the 1999 NatWest Trophy. In his only List A match he took 2 wickets at a bowling average of 21.00, with figures of 2/42.
