= Andrew MacKinlay (cricketer) =

South African cricketer

Personal information
- Full name: Andrew Ian MacKinlay
- Born: 21 September 1967 (age 59); Durban, Natal Province, South Africa
- Batting: Right-handed
- Bowling: Right-arm fast-medium

Domestic team information
- Years: Team
- 1999-2001: Essex Cricket Board
- 1991/92-1992/93: Natal Country Districts

Career statistics
Competition	LA
Matches	6
Runs scored	83
Batting average	27.66
100s/50s	–/–
Top score	33*
Balls bowled	345
Wickets	4
Bowling average	61.25
5 wickets in innings	–
10 wickets in match	–
Best bowling	1/31
Catches/stumpings	–/–
- Source: Cricinfo, 7 November 2010

Andrew Ian MacKinlay (born 21 September 1967) is a former South African cricketer. MacKinlay was a right-handed batsman who bowled right-arm fast-medium. He was born at Durban, Natal Province.

MacKinlay made his debut in List A cricket for Natal Country Districts against Transvaal in the Nissan Shield during the 1991/92 season. His second and final appearance in List A cricket for Natal Country Districts came against Orange Free State in the following season's competition.

MacKinlay later represented the Essex Cricket Board in List A cricket. His first match for the Board came against Ireland in the 1999 NatWest Trophy. From 1999 to 2001, he played 4 matches for the Board, the last of which came against Suffolk in the 2001 Cheltenham & Gloucester Trophy. In his career total of 6 List A matches, he scored 83 runs at a batting average of 27.66, with a high score of 33*. With the ball he took 4 wickets at a bowling average of 61.25, with best figures of 1/31.
