= Christopher Sains =

English cricketer

Personal information
- Full name: Christopher Frederick Sains
- Born: 3 August 1978 (age 48); Romford, London, England
- Batting: Right-handed
- Bowling: Right-arm fast-medium

Domestic team information
- Years: Team
- 2000: Essex Cricket Board

Career statistics
Competition	LA
Matches	1
Runs scored	2
Batting average	–
100s/50s	–/–
Top score	2*
Balls bowled	18
Wickets	–
Bowling average	–
5 wickets in innings	–
10 wickets in match	–
Best bowling	–
Catches/stumpings	–/–
- Source: Cricinfo, 7 November 2010

Christopher Frederick Sains (born 3 August 1978) is an English cricketer. Sains is a right-handed batsman who bowls right-arm fast-medium. He was born in Romford, London.

Sains represented the Essex Cricket Board in a single List A match against the Lancashire Cricket Board in the 2000 NatWest Trophy. In his only List A match, he scored an unbeaten 2 runs.

He currently plays club cricket for Hornchurch Cricket Club.
