= Nicholas Carlier =

English cricketer

Personal information
- Full name: Nicholas Carlier
- Born: 22 March 1968 (age 58); Belper, Derbyshire, England
- Batting: Right-handed

Domestic team information
- Years: Team
- 1999–2000: Essex Cricket Board

Career statistics
| Competition | LA |
|---|---|
| Matches | 3 |
| Runs scored | 92 |
| Batting average | 30.66 |
| 100s/50s | –/1 |
| Top score | 56 |
| Balls bowled | – |
| Wickets | – |
| Bowling average | – |
| 5 wickets in innings | – |
| 10 wickets in match | – |
| Best bowling | – |
| Catches/stumpings | 1/– |
- Source: Cricinfo, 7 November 2010

Nicholas Carlier (born 23 March 1968) is a former English cricketer and a right-handed batsman. He was born in Belper, Derbyshire.

Carlier represented the Essex Cricket Board in 3 List A matches. The first was against Ireland in the 1999 NatWest Trophy. The second and third matches were against the Lancashire Cricket Board and Warwickshire, both in the 2000 NatWest Trophy. In his 3 List A matches, he scored 92 runs at a batting average of 30.66, with a single half century high score of 56. In the field he took a single catch.
