= Alastair Allchin =

English cricketer

Personal information
- Full name: Alastair Thomas Arthur Allchin
- Born: 12 November 1991 (age 35); Chelmsford, Essex, England
- Height: 6 ft 5 in (1.96 m)
- Batting: Right-handed
- Bowling: Right-arm fast-medium

Domestic team information
- Years: Team
- 2013–2016: Cambridge MCCU

Career statistics
Competition	First-class
Matches	3
Runs scored	103
Batting average	25.75
100s/50s	0/1
Top score	59*
Balls bowled	672
Wickets	6
Bowling average	84.16
5 wickets in innings	0
10 wickets in match	0
Best bowling	2/41
Catches/stumpings	0/–
- Source: Cricinfo, 6 February 2020

Alastair Thomas Arthur Allchin (born 12 November 1991) is an English former first-class cricketer.

Allchin was born at Chelmsford in November 1991. He was educated at Sandon School, before going up Anglia Ruskin University. While studying at Anglia Ruskin, Allchin played first-class cricket for Cambridge MCCU, (Note: Cambridge UCCE differed from Cambridge University Cricket Club in that it was open to students at Anglia Ruskin University, whereas Cambridge University Cricket Club is exclusively for students of the constituent colleges of the University of Cambridge.) making his debut against Essex at Fenner's in 2013. He made two further first-class appearances for Cambridge MCCU in 2016, against Essex and Nottinghamshire. He scored a total of 103 runs in his three first-class matches, at an average of 25.75 and a high score of 59 not out. With his right-arm fast-medium bowling, he took 6 wickets at a bowling average of 84.16, with best figures of 2 for 41.
