= Graham Dill =

English cricketer

Personal information
- Full name: Graham John Dill
- Born: 14 September 1970 (age 56); Luton, Bedfordshire, England
- Batting: Right-handed
- Bowling: Right-arm medium-fast

Domestic team information
- Years: Team
- 2001: Cambridge UCCE
- 2001: Cambridge University
- 2002: Hertfordshire

Career statistics
Competition	First-class
Matches	4
Runs scored	27
Batting average	5.40
100s/50s	–/–
Top score	8
Balls bowled	486
Wickets	5
Bowling average	60.20
5 wickets in innings	–
10 wickets in match	–
Best bowling	2/54
Catches/stumpings	3/–
- Source: Cricinfo, 13 August 2020

Graham John Dill (born 14 September 1970) is an English former first-class cricketer.

Dill was born at Luton in September 1970. He was educated at St Albans School, before going up to University College, Swansea. At the age of thirty he attended a postgraduate teacher training course at Homerton College, Cambridge. While studying at Cambridge, Dill played first-class cricket in 2001, making three appearances for Cambridge UCCE and one appearance for Cambridge University against Oxford University in The University Match. His four matches yielded him 27 runs and 5 wickets. Dill gained a blue in both cricket and golf and was the first person to gain a double-blue in both cricket and golf since Ted Dexter forty years previously. In 2002, he played minor counties cricket for Hertfordshire.
