= Matt Hickey =

English cricketer

Personal information
- Full name: Matthew Robert Hickey
- Born: 23 September 1991 (age 35); Wandsworth, London, England
- Batting: Left-handed
- Bowling: Left-arm medium

Domestic team information
- Years: Team
- 2011: Cambridge MCCU
- 2011–2013: Cambridge University

Career statistics
| Competition | First-class |
|---|---|
| Matches | 4 |
| Runs scored | 125 |
| Batting average | 20.83 |
| 100s/50s | –/1 |
| Top score | 53 |
| Balls bowled | 342 |
| Wickets | 4 |
| Bowling average | 55.75 |
| 5 wickets in innings | – |
| 10 wickets in match | – |
| Best bowling | 2/63 |
| Catches/stumpings | –/– |
- Source: Cricinfo, 26 August 2020

Matthew Robert Hickey (born 23 September 1991) is an English former first-class cricketer.

Hickey was born at Wandsworth in September 1991 and was educated at Torquay Boys' Grammar School, before going up to Trinity Hall, Cambridge. While studying at Cambridge, he played first-class cricket for Cambridge University from 2011 to 2013, making three appearances against Oxford University in The University Match, scoring 103 runs with a high score of 53 and taking 3 wickets with his left-arm medium pace. In addition to playing for Cambridge University, he also made a single first-class appearances for Cambridge MCCU in 2011 against Middlesex at Fenner's. (Note: Cambridge MCCU differed from Cambridge University Cricket Club in that it was open to students at Anglia Ruskin University, whereas Cambridge University Cricket Club is exclusively for students of the constituent colleges of the University of Cambridge.)
