= Alex Richards (cricketer) =

English cricketer

Personal information
- Full name: Alexander Charles Richards
- Born: 13 September 1971 (age 55); Ilford, London, England
- Batting: Right-handed
- Bowling: Right-arm off break

Domestic team information
- Years: Team
- 1999–2003: Essex Cricket Board

Career statistics
Competition	LA
Matches	6
Runs scored	172
Batting average	28.66
100s/50s	–/2
Top score	64
Balls bowled	–
Wickets	–
Bowling average	–
5 wickets in innings	–
10 wickets in match	–
Best bowling	–
Catches/stumpings	4/–
- Source: Cricinfo, 7 November 2010

Alexander Charles Richards (born 13 September 1971) is an English cricketer. Richards is a right-handed batsman who bowls right-arm off break. He was born in Ilford, London.

Richards played for Durham University Cricket Club as a student. He represented the Essex Cricket Board in List A cricket. His debut List A match came against Ireland in the 1999 NatWest Trophy. From 1999 to 2003, he represented the Board in 6 List A matches, the last of which came against Essex in the 2003 Cheltenham & Gloucester Trophy. In his 6 List A matches, he scored 172 runs at a batting average of 28.66, with 2 half centuries and a high score of 64. In the field he took 4 catches.
