= Randy Paul (actor) =

American actor and model

- Born: Robert Harris; December 15, 1960; Bay Shore, Long Island, U.S.
- Died: November 3, 2020 (aged 59); New York, U.S.
- Other name: Randy Harris
- Education: American Academy of Dramatic Arts
- Occupations: Actor; model
- Years active: 1983–2005
- Agent: Falcon Studios

Robert Harris (December 15, 1960 – November 3, 2020), known professionally as Randy Paul, was an American adult film actor, model, and trained stage performer. He was a prominent figure during the "Golden Age" of adult cinema in the 1980s and 1990s, recognized for his athletic "all-American" appearance and his rare ability to navigate the industry's straight, gay, and fetish markets.

== Early life and education ==
Born in Bay Shore, Long Island, Harris grew up in a volatile household. Following the separation of his parents when he was eight, he witnessed a series of violent domestic incidents, culminating in his father attacking his mother with an ice pick. Harris's father died shortly thereafter.

Despite these early traumas, Harris was a gifted athlete, participating in baseball, basketball, and surfing. He was a high-achieving student placed in honors programs, though he later struggled with truancy. At age 19, seeking structure, he enlisted in the United States Navy. Following his service, he pursued a career in the arts, attending the prestigious American Academy of Dramatic Arts in New York City, He was one of only 75 students invited back for a second year of study, where he trained as a classical theater actor.

== Career ==
=== Entry and modeling ===
Harris began his career in the adult industry as a print and catalog model. His initial professional work consisted of still photography for both gay men's magazines and mainstream adult publications. His "boy next door" aesthetic made him a high-demand subject for print before he ever appeared on film.

=== Entry into Adult Film (1983–1986) ===
Harris's introduction to the industry began in the early 1980s when he met actress Veronica Hart in New York. She invited him to appear as an extra in a softcore production. Faced with the financial pressure of supporting a partner and her young son, Harris decided to enter the adult industry professionally in 1986.

=== The "Randy Paul" Era ===
Using the name Randy Paul, he initially performed in gay and bisexual films for producers like Terry LeGrand and Falcon Studios. He eventually attempted to transition into the straight market, signing with agents Jim South and Reb Sawitz.

During this time, he faced significant industry stigma regarding "crossover" performers. Despite this, his acting talent and physique made him a high-demand star. Notable career highlights include such as Stryker Force (with Jeff Stryker), Final Impact, and Thrilled to Death. He performed alongside industry icons such as Nina Hartley, Amber Lynn, Peter North, and Siobhan Hunter.

He was nominated for the AVN Awards for Best Supporting Actor for his performance in the 1988 film The Horneymooners. This production was a popular parody of the classic television series, in which Paul played the role of Ed Norton.

In the 1990s, he became a fixture in the New York fetish scene, specifically the Toe Tales series produced by Adventure Studios, where he was cast as a "dominant" performer.

=== Later Life ===
As the adult industry moved away from New York in the early 2000s, Harris transitioned into the culinary arts. He worked as a chef in high-end Manhattan establishments, including Sarabeth's Kitchen and various 5-star hotels.

In his later years, he returned to his hometown of Bay Shore. He remained a devoted father figure to his former partner's son, whom he had helped raise since the mid-1980s. Harris continued to practice acting and singing as a hobby.

== Personal life ==
Though he became a star in gay cinema, Harris was famously candid about his orientation, describing himself as "70% straight, 30% bi" and maintaining that he only sought romantic "soulmate" connections with women. He shared a lifelong, inseparable bond with his younger brother. Harris served as the godfather to his nephew (his younger brother's son), a role he took with great seriousness as the family's "all-American" patriarch. His habits, including a strict physical fitness regimen and a clean living space, were often attributed to his time in the Navy.

== Death ==
Robert Harris died on November 3, 2020, at the age of 59.

== Filmography ==
=== Film ===
Year	Title	Role	Notes
1985	Cumshot Revue 2	Actor	
1986	Bigger They Come	Actor	Catalina Video
1986	Blazing Bedrooms	Guy Restrooms	
1986	Breaking In	Stankowski	Western Visuals
1986	Crocodile Blondee 1	Actor	
1986	On Top	Brunet Farmhand	
1986	Revenge of the Babes 2	Actor	
1986	Stick Shift	Actor	
1986	Sticky Business	Richard	
1986	Stryker Force	Stryker Force Member	Co-starring Jeff Stryker
1986	Sweet Revenge	Actor	Directed by Henri Pachard
1986	Twins	Actor	Starring Careena Collins
1987	A Tale of Ambrosia	Paul	
1987	Bi Heat (1-4)	Husband	Zane Entertainment series
1987	Black Silk Secrets	Actor	
1987	Body Games	Actor	
1987	Careena: Young and Restless	Actor	
1987	Charmed and Dangerous	Councilman Braxton	Vivid Video
1987	Close Friends	George	
1987	Deep Inside Trading	Jack	Directed by Paul Thomas
1987	Divorce Court Expose (1-2)	Joseph Studman / Louie	
1987	Endzone	Actor	
1987	Foxy Ladies	Actor	
1987	Fresh	Charles Cartier	
1987	In Hot Pursuit	Homeowner's son	
1987	Living Doll	Len	
1987	Lust Tango in Paris	Antonio	
1987	Oral Majority (3-4)	Actor	
1987	Orgies	Actor	
1987	Pay The Lady	Dr. John Wilkerson	
1987	Porsche Lynn - The Legend	Actor	
1987	Sex Derby	Mike Johnson	
1987	Sex World Girls	Lance	
1987	Taija	Actor	
1987	Tasty Kind of Love	Actor	
1987	Toys 4 Us 1	Actor	
1987	Young and Innocent	Actor	
1988	Back to Class 2	Actor	
1988	Backdoor to Hollywood 4	Actor	
1988	Best of Caught from Behind 2	Actor	
1988	Careena 2: Star On The Rise	Actor	
1988	Caught from Behind 8	Actor	
1988	Cheating American Style	Actor	
1988	Cruisin' 1: Men On The Make	Actor	Falcon Studios
1988	Days Gone Bi	Actor	
1988	Debbie's Love Spell	Actor	
1988	Domination And Fantasies	Actor	
1988	Easy Access	Paul	
1988	Every Man's Fancy	Actor	
1988	Flirt	Actor	
1988	Girls of the BLO	Actor	
1988	Good Evening Vietnam	Actor	
1988	Haulin' 'n Baulin'	Actor	
1988	Heat of the Nite	Actor	
1988	Horneymooners (1-2)	Ed Norton	Parody of The Honeymooners
1988	Little Red Riding Hood	Actor	
1988	Oral Majority 6	Actor	
1988	Pacific Intrigue	Actor	
1988	Pearl Divers	Actor	
1988	Perfect Summer	Actor	Falcon Studios
1988	Pink Baroness	Actor	
1988	Raging Hormones	Actor	
1988	Right Tool For The Job	Actor	
1988	Scent Of Samantha	Actor	
1988	Scorching Secrets	Actor	
1988	Secret Fantasies Of Submissive Women	Actor	
1988	Seduction of Tracy Adams	Actor	
1988	Shoot To Thrill	John	
1988	Spend the Holidays with Barbii	Ted	
1988	Stroke 41: Every Inch A Winner	Actor	
1988	Taste of Ambrosia	Paul	Femme Productions
1988	Taste of Porsche	Actor	
1988	Touch of Pleasure	Actor	
1988	Twenty Something 1	Actor	
1988	Twisted Sisters	John	
1988	Back to Class 2	Actor	
1988	Backdoor to Hollywood 4	Actor	
1988	Careena 2: Star On The Rise	Actor	
1988	Caught from Behind 8	Actor	
1988	Cheating American Style	Actor	
1988	Cruisin' 1: Men On The Make	Actor	Falcon Studios
1988	Days Gone Bi	Actor	
1988	Debbie's Love Spell	Actor	
1988	Domination And Fantasies	Actor	
1988	Easy Access	Actor	
1988	Every Man's Fancy	Actor	
1988	Flirt	Jeremiah	
1988	Girls of the BLO	Actor	
1988	Good Evening Vietnam	Actor	
1988	Haulin' 'n Baulin'	Actor	
1988	Heat of the Nite	Actor	
1988	Horneymooners (1-2)	Ed Norton	Parody of The Honeymooners
1988	Little Red Riding Hood	Hansel	
1988	Oral Majority 6	Actor	
1988	Pacific Intrigue	Actor	
1988	Pearl Divers	Actor	
1988	Perfect Summer	Actor	Falcon Studios
1988	Pink Baroness	Actor	
1988	Raging Hormones	Boxer	
1988	Right Tool For The Job	Andrew	
1988	Scent Of Samantha	Actor	
1988	Scorching Secrets	Actor	
1988	Seduction of Tracy Adams	Actor	
1988	Shoot To Thrill	John	
1988	Taste of Ambrosia	Actor	Femme Productions
1988	Touch of Pleasure	Actor	
1988	Twenty Something 1	Bill Davenport	
1988	Twisted Sisters	John	
1989	Big Tit Hookers	Actor	
1989	Body Heat	Actor	
1989	More The Merrier	Actor	
1989	Those Lynn Girls	Actor	Starring Amber Lynn
1989	Wild Women 24: Jeanna Fine	Actor	Western Visuals
1990	Best of Mike Henson	Actor	Compilation
1990	Between My Breasts 9	Actor	
1992	Every Man's Fancy	Actor	
1992	Much More Than A Mouthful 2	Actor	
1993	Two for One 2	Actor	
1994	Anal Hall of Fame	Actor	
1994	Tijuana Toilet Tramps	Actor	
1994	Vice Cop	Actor	Directed by Sam Schad
1995	Dungeon Drag Queens	Actor	
1995	Hot Shots 14	Actor	
1995	Measuring Up	Actor	
1995	She Male Adventures 3	Actor	
1995	Toe Tales 27	Dominant	Gotham Gold series
1995	XXX Files 108	Actor	
1996	Bent To Her Will	Actor	
1996	Chicks with Dicks 2	Actor	
1996	Firm Hands	Actor	
1996	Going Down Slow (II)	Actor	
1996	Hunk Hunt 14	Actor	
1996	Mistress Sensei's House of Pain	Actor	
1996	She-Male She-Devils	Actor	
1996	Shock Treatment	Actor	
1996	Toe Tales (31, 33)	Dominant	
1996	TV's In Leather And Pain	Actor	
1996	XXX Volume 4	Actor	
1997	Bikini Models Spanked	Actor	Bizarre Video
1997	Cirque De Torment	Actor	
1997	Club Dom	Actor	
1997	Cold Sweat	Actor	Vivid Video
1997	Irresistible TV's	Actor	
1997	Mistress Rhianon's Dungeon of Fear	Actor	
1997	Night School Spanking	Actor	
1997	Portrait Of A TS	Actor	
1997	She Male Swat Team 1	Actor	
1997	Spanked Therapy	Actor	
1997	Toe Tales (44, 46)	Dominant	
1997	Troy Likes It	Actor	
1997	TV (Twister, Virgins, Whorehouse)	Actor	Specialty titles
1997	Vows Of Servitude	Actor	
1998	Anna Malle Within	Actor	
1998	Club Dom 2	Actor	
1998	Enema X-treme	Actor	
1998	Foot Fetish Fantasies 3	Actor	
1998	Foot Therapy	Actor	
1998	Lingerie Models Spanked	Actor	
1998	New York Taxi Tales 3	Actor	
1998	New York Uncovered (3-4)	Actor	
1998	Real Spanking Fantasies	Actor	
1998	She Male Swat Team 2	Actor	
1998	Smothering Bitches (3-4)	Actor	
1998	Toe Tales (49-55)	Dominant	Multiple appearances
1998	Transsexual Dynasty (1-4)	Actor	Bizarre Video series
1998	TS Sex School	Actor	
1998	Uncensored: All Male Sex	Actor	
1999	Dark Side of Pleasure	Actor	
1999	Enormous Cocks	Actor	
1999	Jill Kelly's Fetish Fantasies	Actor	
1999	Pantyhose Bondage	Actor	
1999	Smothering Bitches 8	Actor	
1999	Toe Tales (48, 59-66)	Dominant	Series regular
1999	Toilet Teasers	Actor	
2000	Foot Fetish Fantasies 4	Actor	Bizarre Video
2000	Legs For Pleasure 2	Actor	
2000	Poolside Sex	Actor	Falcon Studios
2000	She-Male Nation (1-2)	Actor	
2000	Smothering Bitches 17	Actor	Gotham Gold
2000	Toe Tales (75-78)	Dominant	
2001	Bondage in the First Degree	Actor	
2001	Impure Acts	Actor	
2001	Mistress of the Whip 7	Actor	
2001	Moo Goo Gai Pain	Actor	Directed by Sam Schad
2001	She Males Enslaved 1	Actor	
2001	Smothering Bitches 23	Actor	
2001	Toe Tales (84, 86)	Dominant	
2002	She Males Enslaved 2	Actor	
2005	Amateur Nights 1	Actor	Coast to Coast
2005	Rachel Ashley Collection	Himself	Legacy compilation; IAFD
2005	Smothering Bitches (50-51)	Actor	
2005	Toe Tales 113	Dominant	Final series appearance
2005	Transsexual Extreme 2	Actor	
2007	Swedish Erotica (77, 94)	Actor	Caballero Home Video
2009	Face Fuckers 1	Actor	Falcon Studios
2011	Amber Lynn's Porn Players	Himself	IAFD Archive
2011	Juliette Anderson's Porn Players	Himself	Western Visuals

== Awards and nominations ==
Name of the award ceremony, year presented, category, nominee of the award, and the result of the nomination
Award ceremony	Year	Category	Nominee / Work	Result	Ref.
AVN Awards	1988	AVN Award for Best Supporting Actor	The Horneymooners	Nominated	
