= James Park-Johnson =

English cricketer (born 1998)

Personal information
- Full name: James Charles Park-Johnson
- Born: 14 September 1998 (age 28); Kendal, Westmorland, England
- Batting: Right-handed
- Bowling: Right-arm medium

Domestic team information
- Years: Team
- 2019: Cambridge MCCU

Career statistics
Competition	First-class
Matches	2
Runs scored	28
Batting average	9.33
100s/50s	–/–
Top score	12
Balls bowled	258
Wickets	1
Bowling average	236.00
5 wickets in innings	–
10 wickets in match	–
Best bowling	1/69
Catches/stumpings	1/–
- Source: Cricinfo, 3 September 2020

James Charles Park-Johnson (born 14 September 1998) is an English former first-class cricketer.

Park-Johnson was born at Kendal in September 1998. He was educated at Sedbergh School, before going up to Anglia Ruskin University. While studying at Anglia Ruskin, he made two appearances in first-class cricket for Cambridge MCCU in 2019, against Essex and Nottinghamshire. (Note: Cambridge MCCU differed from Cambridge University Cricket Club in that it was open to students at Anglia Ruskin University, whereas Cambridge University Cricket Club is exclusively for students of the constituent colleges of the University of Cambridge.) He scored 28 runs in his two matches, in addition to taking a single wicket, that of Essex's Ravi Bopara, with his right-arm medium pace bowling.
