= Alex Waghorn =

English cricketer

Personal information
- Full name: Alexander Charles Waghorn
- Born: 9 January 1995 (age 31); Wandsworth, London, England
- Batting: Right-handed
- Bowling: Right-arm medium-fast

Domestic team information
- Years: Team
- 2016: Cambridge MCCU
- 2016: Cambridge University

Career statistics
| Competition | First-class |
|---|---|
| Matches | 2 |
| Runs scored | 10 |
| Batting average | 5.00 |
| 100s/50s | –/– |
| Top score | 6 |
| Balls bowled | 318 |
| Wickets | 5 |
| Bowling average | 49.00 |
| 5 wickets in innings | – |
| 10 wickets in match | – |
| Best bowling | 3/79 |
| Catches/stumpings | –/– |
- Source: Cricinfo, 19 August 2020

Alexander Charles Waghorn (born 9 January 1995) is an English former first-class cricketer.

Waghorn was born at Wandsworth in January 1995. He was educated at the Royal Grammar School, Guildford before going up to Pembroke College, Cambridge. While studying at Cambridge, he made two appearances in first-class cricket in 2016, playing one match apiece for Cambridge MCCU (Note: Cambridge MCCU differed from Cambridge University Cricket Club in that it was open to students at Anglia Ruskin University, whereas Cambridge University Cricket Club is exclusively for students of the constituent colleges of the University of Cambridge.) against Essex at Fenner's and for Cambridge University against Oxford University in The University Match at Oxford. Playing as a right-arm medium-fast, he took 5 wickets in his two matches with best figures of 3 for 79.
