= Tom Hemingway (cricketer) =

English cricketer (born 1986)

Personal information
- Full name: Thomas Lewis Hemingway
- Born: 19 May 1986 (age 40); Stevenage, Hertfordshire, England
- Height: 6 ft 0 in (1.83 m)
- Batting: Right-handed
- Bowling: Right-arm off break

Domestic team information
- Years: Team
- 2007–2008: Cambridge University
- 2008: Cambridge UCCE

Career statistics
Competition	First-class
Matches	5
Runs scored	70
Batting average	17.50
100s/50s	–/–
Top score	34*
Balls bowled	1,240
Wickets	14
Bowling average	48.07
5 wickets in innings	–
10 wickets in match	–
Best bowling	4/58
Catches/stumpings	3/–
- Source: Cricinfo, 6 September 2020

Thomas Lewis Hemingway (born 19 May 1986) is an English former first-class cricketer.

Hemingway was born in May 1986 at Stevenage. He was educated at Winchester College, before going up to Trinity Hall, Cambridge. While studying at Cambridge, he made two first-class appearances for Cambridge University against Oxford University in The University Matches of 2007 and 2008, in addition to making three first-class appearances for Cambridge UCCE against Essex, Somerset and Warwickshire in 2008. (Note: Cambridge UCCE differed from Cambridge University Cricket Club in that it was open to students at Anglia Ruskin University, whereas Cambridge University Cricket Club is exclusively for students of the constituent colleges of the University of Cambridge.) For Cambridge University he took 8 wickets with best figures of 4 for 58 with his off break bowling, while for Cambridge UCCE he took 6 wickets with best figures of 2 for 32. His overall first-class bowling average was 48.07.
