= Edward Hannes =

English physician

Sir Edward Hannes M.D. (died 1710) was an English physician.

== Life ==
He was the son of Edward Hannes of Devizes, Wiltshire. In 1678, he was admitted on the foundation at Westminster School, and was elected a student of Christ Church, Oxford, in 1682. He graduated B.A. in 1686 and M.A. in 1689.

Hannes succeeded Robert Plot as reader in chemistry at Oxford in 1690. He proceeded M.B. in 1691 and M.D. in 1695. He became physician to Queen Anne in June 1702, and was knighted at Windsor Castle on 29 July 1705.

Hannes died on 22 July 1710, in the parish of St Anne's, Westminster, and was buried beside his wife at Shillingford, Berkshire, where there was a monument to his memory. His will gave money towards finishing Peckwater Quadrangle at Christ Church, and towards the erection of a new dormitory at Westminster School.

== Works ==
Hannes contributed to the collections of Oxford poems on the death of Charles II in 1685, and on William III's return from Ireland in 1690 (reprinted in Musarum Anglicanarum Analecta). In 1688, he assisted William King on Reflections on Mr. Varillas his history of Heresy, Book 1, Tome 1, as far as relates to English Matters, more especially those of Wicliff. Joseph Addison addressed a Latin poem to him.

Hannes attended William, Duke of Gloucester, at his death on 30 July 1700, and published an account of the dissection of the body. For this account, he was ridiculed in a satirical poem entitled Doctor Hannes dissected in a familiar epistle by way of Nosce Teipsum, London, 1700.

== Family ==
Hannes married (articles dated 30 September 1698) Anne, daughter of Temperance Packer, widow, of Donnington Castle, Berkshire, by whom he had an only child, Temperance.

== Notes ==
Attribution

This article incorporates text from a publication now in the public domain: Stephen, Leslie; Lee, Sidney, eds. (1890). "Hannes, Edward". Dictionary of National Biography. Vol. 24. London: Smith, Elder & Co.
