= Simon Moore (Essex cricketer) =

English cricketer

Personal information
- Full name: Simon Moore
- Born: 19 June 1973 (age 53); Harlow, Essex, England
- Batting: Right-handed
- Bowling: Right-arm fast-medium

Domestic team information
- Years: Team
- 2000–2001: Essex Cricket Board

Career statistics
Competition	LA
Matches	4
Runs scored	20
Batting average	10.00
100s/50s	–/–
Top score	9*
Balls bowled	211
Wickets	5
Bowling average	25.80
5 wickets in innings	–
10 wickets in match	–
Best bowling	2/25
Catches/stumpings	1/–
- Source: Cricinfo, 7 November 2010

Simon Moore (born 19 June 1973) is a former English cricketer. Moore was a right-handed batsman who bowled right-arm fast-medium. He was born at Harlow, Essex.

Moore represented the Essex Cricket Board in a single List A cricket. His debut List A match came against the Lancashire Cricket Board in the 2000 NatWest Trophy. From 2000 to 2001, he represented the Board in 4 List A matches, the last of which came against the Sussex Cricket Board in the 1st round of the 2002 Cheltenham & Gloucester Trophy which was held in 2001. In his 4 List A matches, he scored 20 runs at a batting average of 10.00, with a high score of 9*. In the field he took a single catch. With the ball he took 5 wickets at a bowling average of 25.80, with best figures of 2/25.
