= Harrison Palmer =

English cricketer

Personal information
- Full name: Harrison John Palmer
- Born: 13 October 1996 (age 30); Enfield, London, England
- Batting: Right-handed

Domestic team information
- Years: Team
- 2016–2018: Cambridge MCCU
- 2016: Hertfordshire

Career statistics
Competition	First-class
Matches	5
Runs scored	123
Batting average	15.37
100s/50s	–/–
Top score	32
Catches/stumpings	4/–
- Source: Cricinfo, 5 July 2019

Harrison John Palmer (born 13 October 1996) is an English former first-class cricketer.

Palmer made his debut in first-class cricket for Cambridge MCCU against Essex at Fenner's. He played first-class cricket for Cambridge MCCU until 2018, making a total of five appearances. He scored 123 runs in these matches, with a high score of 32. In addition to playing first-class cricket, Harrison also played minor counties cricket for Hertfordshire in 2016, making four appearances in the Minor Counties Championship.
