= Alex Hearne =

English cricketer

Personal information
- Full name: Alexander Gordon Hearne
- Born: 23 September 1993 (age 33); Kensington, London, England
- Height: 6 ft 0 in (1.83 m)
- Batting: Right-handed
- Bowling: Leg break

Domestic team information
- Years: Team
- 2013–2016: Cambridge University
- 2013–2014: Cambridge MCCU

Career statistics
Competition	First-class
Matches	6
Runs scored	265
Batting average	26.50
100s/50s	–/1
Top score	88
Catches/stumpings	–/–
- Source: Cricinfo, 26 August 2020

Alexander Gordon Hearne (born 23 September 1993) is an English former first-class cricketer.

Hearne was born at Kensington in September 1993 and was educated at Radley College, before going up to St John's College, Cambridge. While studying at Cambridge, he played four first-class cricket matches for Cambridge University against Oxford University in The University Matches of 2013, 2014, 2015 and 2016. He made an additional two first-class appearances for Cambridge MCCU against county opposition in the form of Essex in 2013 and Surrey in 2014. (Note: Cambridge MCCU differed from Cambridge University Cricket Club in that it was open to students at Anglia Ruskin University, whereas Cambridge University Cricket Club is exclusively for students of the constituent colleges of the University of Cambridge.) In six first-class matches, he scored 265 runs, 253 of which came for Cambridge University at an average of 36.14 and with a high score of 88.
