= Chris Williams (cricketer, born 1983) =

English cricketer

Personal information
- Full name: Christopher Williams
- Born: 17 March 1983 (age 43); Rochford, Essex, England
- Batting: Left-handed
- Bowling: Right-arm medium-fast

Domestic team information
- Years: Team
- 2002: Essex Cricket Board

Career statistics
Competition	LA
Matches	1
Runs scored	7
Batting average	7.00
100s/50s	–/–
Top score	7
Balls bowled	24
Wickets	–
Bowling average	–
5 wickets in innings	–
10 wickets in match	–
Best bowling	–
Catches/stumpings	–/–
- Source: Cricinfo, 7 November 2010

Christopher Williams (born 17 March 1983) is an English cricketer. Williams is a left-handed batsman who bowls right-arm medium-fast. He was born at Rochford, Essex.

Williams represented the Essex Cricket Board in a single List A match against the Surrey Cricket Board in the 2nd round of the 2003 Cheltenham & Gloucester Trophy which was held in 2002. In his only List A match, he scored 7 runs.
