= Christopher Hodder-Williams =

English author and musician

- Hodder-Williams circa 1964
- Born: 25 August 1926 London, England
- Died: 15 May 1995 (aged 68) London, England
- Occupation: Author, musician
- Period: 1957–1984
- Genre: Science fiction, thrillers, espionage, aviation

John Christopher Glazebrook Hodder-Williams (25 August 1926 – 15 May 1995) was an English musician, songwriter and author, primarily of science fiction. He also wrote novels about aviation and espionage. He was the son of Ralph Hodder-Williams, who was one of the owners of the British publishing firm Hodder and Stoughton. Many of his books are early examples of what would later be called techno-thrillers. He also wrote teleplays, and worked as a composer and lyricist.

== Biography ==
Hodder-Williams was born 25 August 1926, in London. He served in the Royal Corps of Signals from 1944 to 1948, where he served in the Middle East. Afterwards, after briefly working at Hodder and Stoughton, he became a jazz pianist and songwriter on Broadway in the early 1950s. He eventually returned to England, continuing to write songs & perform, before he published his first novel (The Cummings Report) in 1958 under the pseudonym James Brogan. His next 14 novels were published under his own name, and varied in genre. Hodder-Williams described some of his work as "fiction science". He was also a pilot, a theme that appears in several of his early literary works.

Hodder-Williams died on 15 May 1995, in London.

== Partial bibliography ==
=== Novels ===
- The Cummings Report (1957), originally published under the pseudonym James Brogan
- Chain Reaction (1959)
- Final Approach (1960)
- Turbulence (1961)
- The Higher They Fly (1963)
- The Main Experiment (1964)
- The Egg-Shaped Thing (1966)
- Fistful of Digits (1968)
- 98.4 (1969), also published as Ninety-Eight Point Four
- Panic O'Clock (1973)
- Coward's Paradise (1974)
- The Prayer Machine (1976)
- The Silent Voice (1977)
- The Thinktank That Leaked (1979)
- Chromosome Game (1984)

=== Teleplays ===
For Armchair Theatre:

- The Ship That Couldn't Stop (1961)
- The Higher They Fly (1963)
- A Voice in the Sky (1965)

For the British television series Suspense:

- The White Hot Coal (1962)

== External resources ==
- Christopher Hodder-Williams at the Internet Speculative Fiction Database
- Christopher Hodder-Williams at IMDb
