= Christine Williams (nutritionist) =

British nutritionist

Christine Mary Williams OBE is Professor emeritus of Human Nutrition and was Pro-Vice-Chancellor (Research and Innovation) at the University of Reading.

Williams has a BSc in Nutrition (University of London, 1973) and a PhD from Guy's Hospital Medical School (1978). From 1978 to 1995, she worked at the University of Surrey, as a post-doctoral researcher, then Lecturer, then Reader in Human Nutrition. She moved to Reading in 1995 as Hugh Sinclair Professor of Nutrition, and has been Head of the School of Food Biosciences (2003–2006), Dean of Life Sciences (2006–2008), and Pro-Vice-Chancellor (Enterprise) before taking up her current position of Pro-Vice-Chancellor (Research and Innovation) in 2008. She is also Director of Food, Agriculture and Health in the School of Agricultural Policy and Development, and a member of the University's Institute for Cardiovsascular and Metabolic Research (ICMR), where she is involved in research groups in "Diet composition and cardiovascular disease phenotype research", and "Obesity, insulin and cell signalling research".

She was awarded an OBE "For services to Higher Education and to Nutrition Science" in the 2013 Birthday Honours.

In July 2022, Williams was awarded the honorary degree of Doctor of Science by the University of Reading after more than 25 years of service to the university.
