= Mohd Arfan Rashid =

Malaysian footballer

Personal information
- Full name: Mohd Arfan bin Rashid
- Date of birth: 5 March 1991 (age 35)
- Place of birth: Kedah, Malaysia
- Height: 5 ft 6 in (1.68 m)
- Position: Midfielder

Team information
- Current team: PB Melayu Kedah
- Number: 20

Youth career
- 2009: Kedah FA President Cup

Senior career*
Years	Team	Apps	(Gls)
2009–2012	Kedah FA	2	(0)
2013–present	PB Melayu Kedah	1	(0)
- * Club domestic league appearances and goals

Mohd Arfan bin Rashid (born 5 March 1991, in Alor Setar, Kedah) is a Malaysian football midfielder currently playing for Kedah FA.

Arfan, a member of the team that came runner-up in the 2009 Kings' Gold Cup (Malay: Piala Emas Raja-Raja), was promoted to the senior squad after Kedah coach Haji Ahmad Yusof brought him in as backup for current midfielder players. Ahmad was forced to bring another midfielder after Ahmad Fauzi Saari faced with a serious knee injury.

Arfan made his competitive debut for Kedah FA in a Malaysia Super League match against Johor FA in a 3–0 win on 9 January 2010.
