= David Noble (cricketer) =

English cricketer

Personal information
- Full name: David Jonathan Noble
- Born: 8 November 1982 (age 44); Manchester, Lancashire, England
- Batting: Right-handed
- Bowling: Right-arm medium-fast

Domestic team information
- Years: Team
- 2002–2004: Cambridge University
- 2002: Cambridge UCCE

Career statistics
Competition	First-class
Matches	6
Runs scored	94
Batting average	13.42
100s/50s	–/–
Top score	21
Balls bowled	942
Wickets	9
Bowling average	66.55
5 wickets in innings	–
10 wickets in match	–
Best bowling	3/66
Catches/stumpings	–/–
- Source: Cricinfo, 17 August 2020

David Jonathan Noble (born 8 November 1982) is an English former first-class cricketer.

Noble was born at Manchester in November 1982. He was educated at Rugby School, before going up to Emmanuel College, Cambridge to study medicine. While studying at Cambridge, he played first-class cricket for Cambridge University from 2002–04, making three appearances against Oxford University in The University Match. In addition to playing for Cambridge University, he also made three first-class appearances for Cambridge UCCE in 2002 against Middlesex, Essex and Surrey. (Note: Cambridge UCCE differed from Cambridge University Cricket Club in that it was open to students at Anglia Ruskin University, whereas Cambridge University Cricket Club is exclusively for students of the constituent colleges of the University of Cambridge.) He scored 94 runs in his six first-class matches, with a high score of 21. With his right-arm medium-fast bowling, he took 9 wickets with best figures of 3 for 66. After graduating from Cambridge, he became a clinical oncologist.
