= Jivan Lotay =

English cricketer

Personal information
- Full name: Jivan Daulat Singh Lotay
- Born: 25 July 1990 (age 36); High Wycombe, Buckinghamshire, England
- Batting: Left-handed
- Bowling: Right-arm off break

Domestic team information
- Years: Team
- 2009–2010: Cambridge UCCE/MCCU

Career statistics
Competition	First-class
Matches	5
Runs scored	87
Batting average	17.40
100s/50s	–/–
Top score	34*
Balls bowled	493
Wickets	7
Bowling average	47.57
5 wickets in innings	–
10 wickets in match	–
Best bowling	3/147
Catches/stumpings	2/–
- Source: Cricinfo, 16 August 2020

Jivan Daulat Singh Lotay (born 25 July 1990) is an English former first-class cricketer.

Lotay was born at High Wycombe in July 1990. He later studied at Anglia Ruskin University, where he played five first-class matches for Cambridge UCCE/MCCU in 2009 and 2010. (Note: Cambridge UCCE/MCCU differed from Cambridge University Cricket Club in that it was open to students at Anglia Ruskin University, whereas Cambridge University Cricket Club is exclusively for students of the constituent colleges of the University of Cambridge.) He scored 87 runs in his five matches, at an average of 17.40 and a high score of 34 not out. With his off break bowling, he took 7 wickets with best figures of 3 for 147. After graduating from Anglia Ruskin, he became an optometrist.
