= Jamie Abbott =

English cricketer (born 1994)

James Barrington Abbott (born 25 May 1994) is an English first-class cricketer active 2014–16 who has played for Cambridge University and the Cambridge Marylebone Cricket Club University team. He was born in Hammersmith. After Eton, he went up to Magdalene College, Cambridge, where he won cricket blues between 2014 and 2016; the last year as captain. After Cambridge he played for Wanderers Cricket Club. He has appeared in six first-class matches to the end of the 2016 season.
