= Timothy Jones (cricketer) =

English cricketer

Personal information
- Full name: Timothy David Jones
- Born: 26 April 1978 (age 48); South Shields, Tyne and Wear, England
- Batting: Right-handed
- Bowling: Right-arm medium

Domestic team information
- Years: Team
- 1999–2000: Essex Cricket Board

Career statistics
Competition	LA
Matches	3
Runs scored	46
Batting average	23.00
100s/50s	–/–
Top score	29*
Balls bowled	144
Wickets	4
Bowling average	26.75
5 wickets in innings	–
10 wickets in match	–
Best bowling	2/36
Catches/stumpings	–/–
- Source: Cricinfo, 7 November 2010

Timothy David Jones (born 26 April 1978) is a former English cricketer. Jones was a right-handed batsman who bowled right-arm medium pace. He was born at South Shields, Tyne and Wear.

Jones represented the Essex Cricket Board in 3 List A matches. These came against Ireland in the 1999 NatWest Trophy, the Lancashire Cricket Board and Warwickshire, both of which came in the 2000 NatWest Trophy. In his 3 List A matches, he scored 46 runs at a batting average of 23.00, with a high score of 29*. With the ball he took 4 wickets at a bowling average of 26.75, with best figures of 2/36.
