= Vikram Kumar (cricketer) =

English cricketer

Personal information
- Full name: Vikram Harsh Kumar
- Born: 21 January 1981 (age 45); Beckenham, Kent, England
- Batting: Right-handed
- Role: Wicket-keeper

Domestic team information
- Years: Team
- 2001–2003: Cambridge UCCE
- 2001–2003: Cambridge University

Career statistics
| Competition | First-class |
|---|---|
| Matches | 12 |
| Runs scored | 485 |
| Batting average | 28.52 |
| 100s/50s | –/4 |
| Top score | 86* |
| Catches/stumpings | 8/1 |
- Source: Cricinfo, 6 September 2020

Vikram Harsh Kumar (born 21 January 1981) is an English former first-class cricketer.

Kumar was born in January 1981 at Beckenham. He was educated at Dulwich College, before going up to St John's College, Cambridge. He played first-class cricket while at Cambridge for Cambridge University and Cambridge UCCE, with his debut in first-class cricket coming for the latter their inaugural first-class match against Kent. Kumar played first-class until 2003, making nine appearances for Cambridge UCCE and three appearances for Cambridge University against Oxford University in The University Matches of 2001, 2002 and 2003. (Note: Cambridge UCCE differed from Cambridge University Cricket Club in that it was open to students at Anglia Ruskin University, whereas Cambridge University Cricket Club is exclusively for students of the constituent colleges of the University of Cambridge.) Playing as a wicket-keeper, he scored 329 runs for Cambridge UCCE and 156 runs for Cambridge University, with Kumar recording two half centuries for both sides, with his high score of 86 not out for Cambridge UCCE. Behind the stumps he took 8 catches and made a single stumping.
