= Chris Scott (cricketer, born 1964) =

English cricketer

Christopher Wilmot Scott (born in Lincolnshire on 23 January 1964) is a first-class cricketer who played 129 first-class matches for Nottinghamshire and Durham between 1981 and 1996.

He was a wicket keeper/batsman who famously dropped Brian Lara on 18 while playing against Warwickshire at Edgbaston in 1994 off the bowling of Simon Brown. Lara, who had earlier been bowled by an Anderson Cummins no-ball, went on to score 501 not out, the highest individual score in first-class cricket history. Scott's fumble cost 483 runs.

He scored two centuries of his own during his career, and took 283 catches and completed 17 stumpings.

He continues his cricketing career by coaching the Cambridge UCCE side (now the Cambridge MCCU), based at Fenner's, famously coaching the MCCU side to the double in 2012

== Family link to other sport ==
Chris Scott is the nephew of 1960/1970s rugby league player Derek Whitehead who played for his hometown club Swinton as well as Oldham and Warrington. Playing predominantly at full-back he also won three caps for Great Britain against France (twice) and New Zealand. In the 1974 Challenge Cup Final he was awarded the Lance Todd Trophy in his team's victory over Featherstone Rovers by 24–9. In the following season's final he had to be content with a runners up medal against Widnes who beat Warrington by 14–7.
