= Stephen Hawinkels =

South African cricketer

Personal information
- Full name: Stephen John Hawinkels
- Born: 12 March 1982 (age 44); Cape Town, Cape Province, South Africa
- Batting: Right-handed
- Bowling: Right-arm medium

Domestic team information
- Years: Team
- 2001–2004: Oxford University
- 2002–2004: Oxford UCCE

Career statistics
Competition	First-class
Matches	7
Runs scored	322
Batting average	29.27
100s/50s	–/1
Top score	78
Balls bowled	180
Wickets	2
Bowling average	72.50
5 wickets in innings	–
10 wickets in match	–
Best bowling	1/44
Catches/stumpings	1/–
- Source: Cricinfo, 4 May 2020

Stephen John Hawinkels (born 12 March 1982) is a South African banker and former first-class cricketer.

Hawinkels was born at Cape Town in March 1982. He later studied in England at University College at the University of Oxford. While studying at Oxford, he played first-class cricket, making his debut for Oxford University against Cambridge University in The University Match of 2001, with Hawinkels also featuring in its 2002, 2003 and 2004 fixtures. In addition to playing for Oxford University, he also made three first-class appearances for Oxford UCCE in 2002 and 2004. (Note: Oxford UCCE differed from Oxford University Cricket Club in that it was open to students at Oxford Brookes University, whereas Oxford University Cricket Club is exclusively for students of the constituent colleges of the University of Oxford.) In seven first-class appearances, Hawinkels scored 322 runs at an average of 29.27 and with a high score of 78, his only first-class half century. With his right-arm medium pace bowling, he took 2 wickets.

After graduating from Oxford, he became a banker with Goldman Sachs. In 2017, he was promoted to become a managing director at the group.
