= Gareth James =

English cricketer

Personal information
- Full name: Gareth David James
- Born: 1 December 1984 (age 41); Walthamstow, London, England
- Batting: Right-handed
- Bowling: Leg break

Domestic team information
- Years: Team
- 2005/06: Tamil Union Cricket and Athletic Club
- 2007: Suffolk
- 2004-2007: CUCCE
- 2002-2003: Essex Cricket Board

Career statistics
Competition	FC	LA
Matches	13	2
Runs scored	378	52
Batting average	17.18	52.00
100s/50s	–/1	–/1
Top score	51	51*
Balls bowled	12	–
Wickets	–	–
Bowling average	–	–
5 wickets in innings	–	–
10 wickets in match	–	–
Best bowling	–	–
Catches/stumpings	4/–	–/–
- Source: Cricinfo, 8 November 2010

Gareth David James (born 1 December 1984) is an English cricketer. James is a right-handed batsman who bowls leg breaks. He was born at Walthamstow, London.

James was contracted on to the Essex CCC Academy and throughout that time made his List A debut for the Essex Cricket Board against the Surrey Cricket Board in the 2nd round of the 2003 Cheltenham & Gloucester Trophy which was held in 2002. His second and final List A match for the Board came against Essex in the 3rd round same competition which was played in 2003. In his 2 List A matches, he scored 52 runs at a batting average of 51.00, with a single half century high score of 51*.

In 2004, James made his first-class debut for CUCCE against Warwickshire. From 2004 to 2007, he represented the university in 9 first-class matches, the last of which came against Essex. During the 2005/06 Sri Lankan cricket season, James played first-class matches for Tamil Union Cricket and Athletic Club. His debut for the club came against Badureliya Sports Club. During the 2005/06 season, he played 4 first-class matches, the last of which came against Saracens Sports Club. In his career total of 13 first-class matches, he scored 378 runs at an average of 17.18, with a single half century high score of 51. In the field he took 4 catches.

In 2007, he played a single Minor Counties Championship match for Suffolk against Cumberland. In the same season, he also played a single MCCA Knockout Trophy match for the county against Norfolk.

He currently plays club cricket for Brentwood CC in the Essex Premier League, and is currently Director of Sport at St. John's School, Leatherhead.
