= Ian Massey =

English cricketer

Personal information
- Full name: Ian Robert Massey
- Born: 10 September 1985 (age 41); Hereford, Herefordshire, England
- Batting: Right-handed
- Bowling: Right-arm off break

Domestic team information
- Years: Team
- 2006–2007: Cambridge UCCE
- 2006–2007: Cambridge University
- 2006: Herefordshire

Career statistics
Competition	First-class
Matches	5
Runs scored	253
Batting average	28.11
100s/50s	–/1
Top score	65
Balls bowled	–
Wickets	–
Bowling average	–
5 wickets in innings	–
10 wickets in match	–
Best bowling	–
Catches/stumpings	–/–
- Source: Cricinfo, 22 August 2011

Ian Robert Massey (born 10 September 1985) is an English cricketer. Massey is a right-handed batsman who bowls right-arm off break. He was born in Hereford, Herefordshire and educated at Shrewsbury School.

While studying for his degree at Queens' College, Cambridge, Massey made his first-class debut for Cambridge UCCE against Kent in 2006. He made four further first-class appearances while at Cambridge, including two appearances for Cambridge University against Oxford University in the University Matches of 2006 and 2007. In his five first-class matches, he scored 253 runs at an average of 28.11, with a high score of 65. His highest score, which was his only first-class fifty, came against Oxford University in 2007.

In 2006, he made a single Minor Counties Championship appearance for Herefordshire against Cornwall.
