= Frankie Brown (cricketer) =

English cricketer

Francis Andrew Brown (born 21 March 1990 in Nottingham) played first-class cricket between 2009 and 2011.

Brown was educated at Nottingham High School and Jesus College, Cambridge, where he played his first-class matches, initially for Cambridge UCCE against Essex at Fenner's between 11 and 13 June 2009. He played a further six first-class games, including the University Match in 2009 and 2011 for which he won his Blue. He was also awarded Blues for playing in the one-day University Matches at Lord's in 2009, 2010 and 2011.
