= Chris Williams (rugby league) =

Australian rugby league footballer

Personal information
- Full name: Chris Williams
- Born: 19 August 1972 (age 53)

Playing information
- Position: Hooker
Club
Years	Team	Pld	T	G	FG	P
1990–92	Penrith Panthers	2	0	0	0	0
1993–95	Western Suburbs	12	4	0	0	16
	Total	14	4	0	0	16
- Source: As of 22 December 2022

Chris Williams is an Australian former professional rugby league footballer who played in the 1990s. He played for the Penrith Panthers and Western Suburbs in the NSWRL/ARL competition.

== Playing career ==
Williams made his first grade debut for Penrith in round 22 of the 1990 NSWRL season against Western Suburbs at Campbelltown Sports Ground. Williams played off the interchange bench in Penrith's 22–12 loss. In 1992, Williams made one appearance for Penrith in round 20 against the Illawarra Steelers. In 1993, Williams joined Western Suburbs and played three seasons with the club before being released at the end of 1995.
