= Toby Hembry =

English cricketer

Personal information
- Full name: Tobias Digby Charles Hembry
- Born: 16 November 1983 (age 42); Ipswich, Suffolk, England
- Batting: Left-handed

Domestic team information
- Years: Team
- 2004: Cambridge UCCE
- 2004–2007: Suffolk

Career statistics
Competition	First-class
Matches	3
Runs scored	128
Batting average	25.60
100s/50s	–/1
Top score	72
Catches/stumpings	1/–
- Source: Cricinfo, 11 July 2019

Tobias Digby Charles Hembry (born 16 November 1983) is an English former first-class cricketer.

Hembry made three appearances in first-class cricket for Cambridge UCCE, playing twice in 2004 against Essex and Warwickshire, and once in 2005 against Warwickshire. He scored 128 runs in these matches, at an average of 25.60 and a high score of 72, made against Warwickshire in 2005. In addition to playing first-class cricket, Hembry also played minor counties cricket for Suffolk from 2004–07, making eight appearances in the Minor Counties Championship and nine appearances in the MCCA Knockout Trophy.
