= Tom Savill =

English cricketer

Personal information
- Full name: Thomas Edward Savill
- Born: 16 May 1983 (age 43); Sheffield, Yorkshire, England
- Batting: Right-handed
- Bowling: Right-arm medium-fast

Domestic team information
- Years: Team
- 2002-2006: Cambridge University
- 2002: Nottinghamshire
- 2001: Nottinghamshire Cricket Board

Career statistics
Competition	FC	LA
Matches	17	2
Runs scored	363	50
Batting average	18.15	–
100s/50s	–/3	–/–
Top score	59	35*
Balls bowled	2,541	111
Wickets	36	1
Bowling average	50.88	90.00
5 wickets in innings	–	–
10 wickets in match	–	–
Best bowling	4/62	1/45
Catches/stumpings	12/–	1/–
- Source: Cricinfo, 28 September 2010

Thomas Edward Savill (born 16 May 1983) is a former English cricketer. Savill is a right-handed batsman who bowls right-arm medium-fast. He was born in Sheffield, Yorkshire.

Savill made his debut in List-A cricket for the Nottinghamshire Cricket Board against Bedfordshire in the 2001 Cheltenham & Gloucester Trophy at Wardown Park, Luton, with the Board losing by 3 wickets. His second and final List-A appearance for the Board came in 1st round of the 2002 Cheltenham & Gloucester Trophy against Oxfordshire at the Christ Church Ground, Oxford. This round of the competition was played in 2001, with the Board losing by 5 wickets. In his 2 List-A matches for the Board he scored 50 runs, with a high score of 35*. With the ball he took a single wicket at a bowling average of 90.00, with best figures of 1/45.

Savill made his only first-class appearance for Nottinghamshire against West Indies A in 2002. During 2002 he also made his first-class debut for Cambridge University against Middlesex. From 2002 to 2006, he represented the university in 16 first-class matches, the last of which came against Oxford University in the 2006 season. In his combined first-class career, he scored 363 runs at a batting average of 18.15, with 3 half centuries and a high score 59. With the ball he took 36 wickets at a batting average of 50.88, with best figures of 4/62. In the field he also took 12 catches. In local domestic cricket, he plays for Teddington Cricket Club in the Middlesex County Cricket League.
