= Brendan Smith (cricketer) =

English cricketer

Personal information
- Full name: Brendan Mitchell Smith
- Born: 24 September 1985 (age 41); Basildon, Essex, England
- Batting: Left-handed
- Bowling: Left-arm fast-medium

Domestic team information
- Years: Team
- 2007–2008: Cambridge UCCE

Career statistics
Competition	First-class
Matches	5
Runs scored	13
Batting average	13.00
100s/50s	–/–
Top score	11*
Balls bowled	558
Wickets	7
Bowling average	69.42
5 wickets in innings	–
10 wickets in match	–
Best bowling	4/102
Catches/stumpings	1/–
- Source: Cricinfo, 1 September 2020

Brendan Mitchell Smith (born 24 September 1985) is an English former first-class cricketer.

Smith was born at Basildon in September 1985. He later studied at Anglia Ruskin University, where he played first-class cricket for Cambridge UCCE in 2007–08, making five appearances. (Note: Cambridge UCCE differed from Cambridge University Cricket Club in that it was open to students at Anglia Ruskin University, whereas Cambridge University Cricket Club is exclusively for students of the constituent colleges of the University of Cambridge.) Playing as a left-arm fast-medium bowler, he took 7 wickets in his five matches at an average of 69.42, with best figures of 4 for 102.
