= Adnan Akram =

Pakistani-born English cricketer

Personal information
- Full name: Mohammad Adnan Akram
- Born: 23 June 1995 (age 31); Leytonstone, London
- Batting: Right-handed
- Bowling: Right-arm fast-medium

Domestic team information
- Years: Team
- 2002–2003: Essex Cricket Board
- 2003–2005: Cambridge UCCE
- FC debut: 12 April 2003 Cambridge UCCE v Essex
- Last FC: 1 June 2005 Cambridge UCCE v Middlesex
- LA debut: 12 September 2002 Essex Cricket Board v Surrey Cricket Board
- Last LA: 7 May 2003 Essex Cricket Board v Essex

Career statistics
Competition	First-class	List A
Matches	9	2
Runs scored	515	88
Batting average	42.91	44
100s/50s	2/1	0/1
Top score	129*	61
Balls bowled	251	12
Wickets	3	0
Bowling average	64.00	–
5 wickets in innings	0	–
10 wickets in match	0	–
Best bowling	2/85	–
Catches/stumpings	4/–	0/–
- Source: CricketArchive, 17 January 2009

Mohammad Adnan Akram (born 17 November 1983) is an English first-class cricketer who played for Cambridge University Centre of Cricketing Excellence, the Essex Cricket Board and the British Universities cricket team between 2002 and 2005.

== Cricket career ==
Akram's studies at Anglia Polytechnic University made him eligible to play cricket for the Cambridge UCCE team. His first-class debut, alongside his twin brother Arfan Akram, came against Essex in April 2003. He took two wickets in Essex's first innings but was otherwise unsuccessful. His batting form improved with 38 against Kent, before he scored a "match-winning" 98 from just 89 balls against Northants, putting on a rapid partnership of 139 with Tom Webley, as part of the first victory by a UCCE side over a first-class county. He averaged 40.50 with the bat across the first-class season. Following the end of his university term, he appeared for Essex second XI.

Akram played in two of the three Cambridge UCCE first-class matches in the 2004 season. He scored a maiden hundred, striking 20 fours and a six as he reached 128 in 133 balls against Middlesex in a drawn match. In his next first-class match, the first of the 2005 season, he made 129 not out, including a partnership of 230 with skipper Tom Webley. He finished his time at university having scored 515 first-class runs at an average of 42.91 and a strike rate of 67.85.

For the Essex Board XI in the Cheltenham & Gloucester Trophy, Akram scored 61 in the third round as the Essex Board XI were beaten by Essex.
