= Matthew Kay (cricketer) =

English cricketer (born 1962)

Personal information
- Full name: Matthew Cindy Kay
- Born: 9 November 1962 (age 64); London Borough of Enfield
- Bowling: Leg break

Domestic team information
- Years: Team
- 2004: Cambridge UCCE
- 2002–2004: Cambridgeshire

Career statistics
Competition	First-class
Matches	1
Runs scored	21
Batting average	21.00
100s/50s	–/–
Top score	21
Balls bowled	24
Wickets	–
Bowling average	–
5 wickets in innings	–
10 wickets in match	–
Best bowling	–
Catches/stumpings	1/–
- Source: Cricinfo, 22 August 2011

Matthew Cindy Kay (born 9 November 1962) is an English cricketer. Kay is a right-handed batman who bowls leg break. He was born in Enfield, London.

Kay made his only first-class appearance for Cambridge UCCE against Middlesex in 2004. In this match he was dismissed for 21 runs in the university's first-innings by Ed Joyce, while with the ball he bowled 4 wicket-less overs.

He also played Minor counties cricket for Cambridgeshire, making his debut for the county in the 1902 Minor Counties Championship against Hertfordshire. He played Minor counties cricket for Cambridgeshire from 1902 to 1904, making four Minor Counties Championship appearances and a single MCCA Knockout Trophy appearance.
