= Richard Timms =

English cricketer (born 1986)

Personal information
- Full name: Richard Thomas Timms
- Born: 23 August 1986 (age 40); Bristol, England
- Batting: Right-handed
- Bowling: Right-arm fast-medium

Domestic team information
- Years: Team
- 2002: Somerset Cricket Board
- 2005–2008: Cambridge University

Career statistics
Competition	First-class	List A
Matches	7	1
Runs scored	242	38
Batting average	18.61	–
100s/50s	0/2	0/0
Top score	57	38*
Balls bowled	96	0
Wickets	0	–
Bowling average	–	–
5 wickets in innings	0	–
10 wickets in match	0	n/a
Best bowling	0/75	–
Catches/stumpings	2/–	0/–
- Source: CricketArchive, 5 May 2010

Richard Thomas Timms (born 23 August 1986 in Bristol) is an English geneticist and molecular biologist and former cricketer.

== Personal life ==
Richard Timms is married and lives with his wife in Cambridge, UK.

== Cricketing ==
Richard is a right-handed batsman and fast-medium bowler. He attended Millfield School, and was captain of the first XI while there. He made his List A debut in 2002 for Somerset Cricket Board, playing in the first round of the Cheltenham and Gloucester Trophy. He scored 38 not out, batting at number eight. He played Second XI cricket for Somerset from 2004 until 2006, but failed to break into the first-team. While at Cambridge University, he played seven first-class matches for the university, including two Varsity matches. He scored two half-centuries in first-class cricket, against Warwickshire, and Oxford University.

== Scientific career ==
Richard Timms completed his PhD in at the Cambridge Institute for Medical Research in Cambridge, England where he performed genetic screens to identify functions of genes. In particular, he identified the HUSH complex as a regulator of epigenetic repression. After graduating, he continued in the laboratory of Stephen Elledge at Harvard Medical School, where he characterized N-end and C-end protein degradation pathways. He started his own laboratory at the University of Cambridge in 2020.
