= Utkarsh Chandra =

Indian cricketer

Personal information
- Full name: Utkarsh Saurabh Chandra
- Born: 24 March 1983 (age 43); Lucknow, Uttar Pradesh, India
- Nickname: Hupps
- Batting: Right-handed
- Bowling: Right-arm medium

Domestic team information
- Years: Team
- 2002/03–2006/07: Uttar Pradesh
- 2009: Cambridge UCCE

Career statistics
Competition	First-class	List A
Matches	1	6
Runs scored	–	26
Batting average	–	8.66
100s/50s	–/–	–/–
Top score	–	16
Balls bowled	114	204
Wickets	1	3
Bowling average	112.00	65.66
5 wickets in innings	–	–
10 wickets in match	–	–
Best bowling	1/112	2/32
Catches/stumpings	–/–	–/–
- Source: Cricinfo, 6 September 2020

Utkarsh Saurabh Chandra (born 24 March 1983) is an Indian former cricketer.

Chandra was born at Lucknow in March 1983. He played representative cricket for the Uttar Pradesh cricket team, making six List A one-day appearances in the Ranji Trophy One-Day competition between 2002 and 2007. Playing as a right-arm medium pace bowler, he took 3 wickets at an expensive average of 65.66, with best figures of 2 for 32. He later studied in England at Anglia Ruskin University, where he made a single appearance in first-class cricket for Cambridge UCCE against Sussex at Fenner's in 2009. (Note: Cambridge UCCE differed from Cambridge University Cricket Club in that it was open to students at Anglia Ruskin University, whereas Cambridge University Cricket Club is exclusively for students of the constituent colleges of the University of Cambridge.) He took a single wicket in the match, that of Sussex opener Michael Yardy in their first innings, though he was expensive, conceding 112 runs from 19 overs bowled. Returning to India, he was a selector for the Uttar Pradesh Cricket Association in 2017.
