= Arfan Akram =

British first-class cricketer

Personal information
- Full name: Arfan Akram
- Born: 17 November 1983 (age 42); Leytonstone, Essex, England
- Batting: Right-handed
- Bowling: Right-arm
- Relatives: Adnan Akram (twin brother)

Domestic team information
- Years: Team
- 2002–2003: Essex Cricket Board
- 2002–2005: Cambridge UCCE
- 2006–2018: MCC
- 2010: Unicorns
- FC debut: 12 April 2003 Cambridge UCCE v Essex
- Last FC: 1 June 2005 Cambridge UCCE v Middlesex
- LA debut: 12 September 2002 Essex Cricket Board v Surrey Cricket Board
- Last LA: 16 May 2010 Unicorns v Glamorgan

Career statistics
Competition	First-class	List A
Matches	8	3
Runs scored	308	18
Batting average	28	9.00
100s/50s	1/0	0/0
Top score	110	10*
Balls bowled	151	–
Wickets	5	–
Bowling average	26.40	–
5 wickets in innings	0	–
10 wickets in match	0	–
Best bowling	3/41	–
Catches/stumpings	3/–	0/–
- Source: CricketArchive, 18 May 2010

Arfan Akram (Arabic: عَرْفَان أَكْرَم) (born 17 November 1983) is a British cricketer. Akram played second XI cricket for Essex between 2001 and 2003, during which time he also played minor counties and List A cricket for Essex Cricket Board. In 2004 he played second XI cricket for Kent and Derbyshire. While studying leisure and tourism at Anglia Polytechnic University, between 2002 and 2005, he played for Cambridge University Centre of Cricketing Excellence, including eight first-class matches. Akram continued playing amateur cricket as captain of Wanstead and Snaresbrook CC, alongside his twin brother Adnan; he also played for the Marylebone Cricket Club (MCC) between 2006 and 2018.

In 2010, Akram was selected as one of 21 players to form the first Unicorns squad to take part in the Clydesdale Bank 40 domestic limited overs competition against the regular first-class counties. The Unicorns were made up of 15 former county cricket professionals and 6 young cricketers looking to make it in the professional game. In 2012, Akram was working as the university cricket co-ordinator at the University of East London, after which he worked for Essex Cricket as their cricket co-ordinator for East London.
