= Craig Buckham =

English cricketer (born 1983)

Personal information
- Full name: Craig Thomas Buckham
- Born: 9 August 1983 (age 43); Ashford, Kent, England
- Batting: Right-handed
- Bowling: Leg break

Domestic team information
- Years: Team
- 2002: Kent Cricket Board
- 2004–2006: Cambridge UCCE
- 2007–2009: Cambridgeshire

Career statistics
Competition	First-class
Matches	3
Runs scored	14
Batting average	14.00
100s/50s	–/–
Top score	8
Balls bowled	180
Wickets	0
Bowling average	–
5 wickets in innings	–
10 wickets in match	–
Best bowling	–
Catches/stumpings	2/–
- Source: Cricinfo, 19 July 2019

Craig Thomas Buckham (born 9 August 1983) is an English former first-class cricketer.

Buckham was born at Ashford in December 1983. While attending Anglia Ruskin University, Buckham made three appearances in first-class cricket for Cambridge UCCE from 2004–06, playing against Essex, Warwickshire and Kent. A leg break bowler, Buckham bowled a total of 30 overs without taking a wicket, while conceding 187 runs. In addition to playing first-class cricket, Buckham also played at minor counties level. He made two appearances for the Kent Cricket Board in the 2002 MCCA Knockout Trophy, later making seven appearances for Cambridgeshire in the Minor Counties Championship between 2007–2009.
