= James Heywood (cricketer) =

English cricketer (born 1982)

Personal information
- Full name: James John Neville Heywood
- Born: 24 September 1982 (age 44); Eastbourne, East Sussex, England
- Batting: Right-handed
- Role: Wicket-keeper

Domestic team information
- Years: Team
- 2003–2008: Cambridge University

Career statistics
Competition	First-class
Matches	10
Runs scored	86
Batting average	6.61
100s/50s	0/0
Top score	27
Catches/stumpings	16/0
- Source: CricketArchive, 8 February 2017

James John Neville Heywood (born 24 September 1982) is an English cricketer who played first-class cricket from 2003 to 2008.

James Heywood was educated at Worth School in East Sussex, and Pembroke College, Cambridge. A wicket-keeper, he was a regular member of the Cambridge University team from 2003 to 2008, playing six times in the University Match, a Cambridge record.
