= Essex Cricket League =

ECB Premier League

- Countries: England
- Administrator: Essex League Executive Committee
- Format: Single Innings Declaration and Limited Overs
- First edition: 1972
- Latest edition: 2026
- Next edition: 2027
- Tournament format: League
- Number of teams: 10 (Premier Division)
- Current champion: Chelmsford CC
- Most successful: Chelmsford CC (8)
- Website: https://www.essexcricket.com/

The Hamro Foundation Essex Cricket League is the top level of competition for recreational club cricket in Essex and East London, England. The league was founded in 1972. Since 1999 it has been a designated ECB Premier League.

== Champions ==
League Champions 1972–1991
Year	Club
1972	Gidea Park and Romford
1973	Gidea Park and Romford
1974	Orsett and Thurrock
1975	Chelmsford
1976	South Woodford
1977	Gidea Park and Romford
1978	Wanstead
1979	Wanstead
1980	Orsett and Thurrock
1981	Colchester and East Essex
1982	Colchester and East Essex
1983	Gidea Park and Romford
1984	Colchester and East Essex and Westcliff on Sea (Note: The Championship title was shared between Colchester and East Essex Cricket Club and Westcliff on Sea Cricket Club.)
1985	Colchester and East Essex
1986	Woodford Wells
1987	Woodford Wells
1988	Old Brentwoods
1989	Woodford Wells
1990	Ilford
1991	Old Brentwoods

League Champions 1992–2011
Year	Club
1992	Chelmsford
1993	Chelmsford
1994	Woodford Wells
1995	Saffron Walden
1996	Saffron Walden
1997	Wanstead
1998	Fives and Heronians
1999	Fives and Heronians
2000	Wanstead
2001	Saffron Walden
2002	Gidea Park and Romford
2003	Saffron Walden
2004	Saffron Walden
2005	Saffron Walden
2006	Hainault and Clayhall
2007	Ardleigh Green
2008	Wanstead and Snaresbrook
2009	Brentwood
2010	Brentwood
2011	Brentwood

League Champions 2012–Present
Year	Club
2012	Wanstead and Snaresbrook
2013	Wanstead and Snaresbrook
2014	Chingford
2015	Chelmsford
2016	Wanstead and Snaresbrook
2017	Chelmsford
2018	Hornchurch
2019	Brentwood
2020	no competition
2021	Chelmsford
2022	Wanstead and Snaresbrook
2023	Hornchurch
2024	Chelmsford
2025	Colchester and East Essex
2026	Chelmsford

=== Championships won ===
- League Championship
  Wins	Club
  8	Chelmsford
  6	Saffron Walden
  5	Gidea Park & Romford
  5	Wanstead & Snaresbrook
  5	Colchester & East Essex (Note: Colchester and East Essex Cricket Club have 1 shared title.)
  4	Brentwood
  4	Wanstead
  4	Woodford Wells
  2	Fives & Heronians
  2	Hornchurch
  2	Old Brentwoods
  2	Orsett & Thurrock
  1	Ardleigh Green
  1	Chingford
  1	Hainault & Clayhall
  1	Ilford
  1	South Woodford
  1	Westcliff on Sea (Note: Shared title.)

== Performance by season from 1999 ==
Key
Gold	Champions
Blue	Left League
Red	Relegated

Premier Division 1st XI performance by season, from 1999
Club	1999	2000	2001	2002	2003	2004	2005	2006	2007	2008	2009	2010	2011	2012	2013	2014	2015	2016	2017	2018	2019	2021	2022	2023 (Note: No teams were relegated from the premier division at the end of the 2023 season due to the ineligibility of clubs from the division below to be promoted.)	2024	2025	2026
Ardleigh Green (Note: Ardleigh Green entered into a merger after the 2018 season and became Ardleigh Green and Havering-Atte-Bower. They subsequently left the Hamro Foundation Essex League after the conclusion of the 2023 season and joined the T-Rippon Mid-Essex League for the 2024 season.)								5	1	2	10		8	10													
Belhus																					8	6	9				
Billericay	5	10																		6	6	10				10	
Brentwood								4	4	8	1	1	1	4	2	3	2	2	3	3	1	3	2	3	2	4	5
Buckhurst Hill														7	10		7	9			9			9	6	8	8
Chelmsford		9									4	3	6	2	5	5	1	3	1	5	3	1	6	4	1	2	1
Chingford									7	10					6	1	5	8	6	4	7	8	8	10	9		
Colchester & East Essex			5	5	9				5	7	6	6	5	5	9		4	6	9			7	3	2	5	1	7
Epping																											4
Fives & Heronians	1	7	3	8	8	10																				6	10
Gidea Park & Romford	7	8	4	1	2	6	5	6	6	5	8	10															
Hadleigh & Thundersley		3	9		10															7	4	4	4	6	8	10	
Hainault & Clayhall (Note: Hainault and Clayhall changed its name to Frenford in 2019.)	4	5	6	6	4	3	2	1	8	6	5	5	9														
Harold Wood																7	10					9					
Hornchurch							9											4	5	1	5	5	7	1	4	7	9
Horndon on the Hill (Note: Left the Hamro Foundation Essex League after the conclusion of the 2025 season and joined the T-Rippon Mid-Essex League for the 2026 season.)			10																								
Hutton																							5	7	7	5	2
Ilford					5	7	7	7	9			8	4	6	7	4	8	7	7	8	10						
Loughton	8	4	7	4	3	4	8	10				4	10			8	9							8	10		6
Orsett & Thurrock				9																							
Saffron Walden (Note: Saffron Walden left the league after the 2008 season to join the East Anglian Premier Cricket League.)	2	2	1	3	1	1	1	2	3	3																	
Shenfield	6	6	8	10		9								3	3	9		5	4	9			10				
South Woodford				7	6	5	6	9		9	9		3	8	4	6	6	10									
Southend on Sea and EMT (Note: Left the Hamro Foundation Essex League after the conclusion of the 2024 season and joined the T-Rippon Mid-Essex League for the 2025 season.)																			8	10							
Upminster										4	7	9			8	10			10								
Wanstead (Note: Wanstead entered into a merger after the 2005 season and became Wanstead and Snaresbrook.)	3	1	2	2	7	2	3																				
Wanstead & Snaresbrook								3	2	1	2	2	2	1	1	2	3	1	2	2	2	2	1	5	3	3	3
Westcliff on Sea						8	10																				
Wickford	10						4	8	10																		
Woodford Wells	9										3	7	7	9													
References																											
