= Essex Cricket Board =

The Essex Cricket Board is the governing body for all recreational cricket in the historic county of Essex.

From 1999 to 2003 the Board fielded a team in the English domestic one-day tournament, matches which had List-A status.

== See also ==
- List of Essex Cricket Board List A players
