= List of Durham UCCE & MCCU players =

This is a list in alphabetical order of cricketers who have played first-class cricket for the Durham University Centre of Cricketing Excellence (UCCE) and Durham MCC University (MCCU).

The Durham UCCE team first played cricket in 2000 and played its first first-class matches in 2001. It developed out of Durham University Cricket Club and was established under head coach Graeme Fowler, a former England Test cricketer. The UCCE team continued until the 2009 season, when the Marylebone Cricket Club (MCC) took over funding from the England and Wales Cricket Board, at which point it was renamed Durham MCCU. MCC funding came to an end in July 2020, although no matches were played in the 2020 season due to the restrictions put in place during the Coronavirus outbreak. In December 2019 the ECB announced that matches with MCCU teams would lose their first-class status as of the 2021 season.

Players listed are those who have played first-class cricket for the team, either as the UCCE team or the MCCU team. Some players will have played senior cricket for other teams.

As of 12 August 2020

== A ==
- Tim Alexander (cricketer)
- Will Angus
- Jamie Atkinson

== B ==
- David Balcombe
- Matthew Banes
- Tom Bartram
- Lewis Bedford (cricketer)
- Christian Begg
- Chris Benjamin (cricketer)
- Chaitanya Bishnoi
- Justin Bishop (cricketer)
- Luke Blackaby
- David Owen Brown
- Michael Brown (cricketer)
- James Bruce (English cricketer)
- Thomas Bruce (cricketer)
- Will Burnell
- Joe Buttleman

== C ==
- Jack Campbell (cricketer)
- Lucas Carlisle
- Ed Carpenter (cricketer)
- Jack Clark (cricketer)
- Adam Clarke (Durham University cricketer)
- Joe Cooke (cricketer)
- Rory Cox
- Matthew Creese

== D ==
- Lee Daggett
- Mark Dale
- Hugo Darby
- Alex Deuchar
- Adam Dewes
- Jonathan Dewes
- Paul Dixey
- Liam Dixon
- Will Dobson
- Jake Dunford
- Luc Durandt

== E ==
- Joe Emanuel
- Laurie Evans (cricketer)

== F ==
- Ed Fenwick
- Rob Ferley
- James Foster (cricketer, born 1980)
- Patrick Foster
- Will Fraine
- Gavin Franklin

== G ==
- Dan Gale
- Robert Gibson (cricketer, born 1994)
- Richard Gilbert (cricketer)
- John Glover (cricketer, born 1989)
- Benedict Graves
- Matt Green (cricketer)

== H ==
- William Hanson (cricketer)
- George Harper (cricketer, born 1988)
- Simon Hawk
- Marc Hazelton
- Ivo Hobson
- Will Hodson
- Andrew Hollingsworth
- Simon Hollingsworth (cricketer)
- Peter Howells (cricketer)

== J ==
- Matthew Jahanfar
- Will Jefferson
- Will Jenkins
- Paul Johnston (cricketer)
- Chris Jones (cricketer)
- Martin Jones (cricketer)

== K ==
- William Kirby (cricketer)
- Eben Kurtz

== L ==
- Nick Lamb (cricketer)
- James Lawrence (cricketer, born 1976)
- Charles Legget
- Neil Longhurst
- Alex Loudon
- Hugo Loudon

== M ==
- Nicholas MacDonagh
- Charlie Macdonell
- Alistair Maiden
- Jason Marshall (cricketer)
- James McCollum
- Alex McGrath
- Harry McInley
- Matt Milnes
- Charlie Morgan (cricketer)
- James Morris (cricketer)
- Mumtaz Habib

== N ==
- Daniel Newton (cricketer)
- Charlie Nicholls (cricketer)

== O ==
- Xavier Owen

== P ==
- Christopher Paget
- Anish Paraam
- Sean Parry
- Luke Patel
- Tim Phillips (cricketer)
- Will Phillips
- Mark Phythian
- Matthew Plater
- Sean Polley
- Ed Pollock
- Tom Powe
- Nick Prowting
- Chris Purshouse

== R ==
- Dimitri Ratnayake
- Hugo Rawlinson
- Glen Read
- Chris Roper
- James Rowe (cricketer)
- Freddie Ruffell
- Mungo Russell

== S ==
- Jonathan Salt (cricketer)
- Ajay Sangha
- Max Scarr
- Charlie Scott (cricketer)
- Shan Masood
- Daniel Shilvock
- Ben Sidwell
- Freddie Simon
- Abhiraj Singh
- Greg Smith (cricketer, born 1988)
- Joshua Smith (cricketer)
- Will Smith (cricketer)
- Vicram Sohal
- John Somerville-Hendrie
- James Sookias
- Martin Souter
- Alex Stead
- Cameron Steel
- Ollie Steele
- Seb Stewart-Taylor
- Jhathavedh Subramanyan

== T ==
- Delroy Taylor
- Greg Thompson (cricketer)
- Mark Thorburn

== V ==
- Freddie van den Bergh
- Charles van der Gucht

== W ==
- Cameron Wake
- Charlie Wallis
- Seren Waters
- Nathaniel Watkins
- Tom Westley
- Rob White
- James Wilkes-Green
- Ross Willett
- Ben Williams
- Darrel Williams
- Robbie Williams
- Jack Wood
- James Wood
