= List of British Universities cricketers =

The British Universities cricket team played in First-class cricket matches between 1996 and 2006 and List A cricket matches between 1996 and 1998. This is a list of the players who appeared in those matches.

== A ==
- Jimmy Adams (2002–2004): JHK Adams
- Adnan Akram (2005): Adnan Akram
- Omar Anwar (2004): OS Anwar

== B ==
- Jitin Bahl (1996): J Bahl
- Toby Bailey (1997–1998): TMB Bailey
- David Balcombe (2006): DJ Balcombe
- Matthew Banes (2000–2001): MJ Banes
- Justin Bishop (2003): JE Bishop
- Scott Boswell (1996–1997): SAJ Boswell
- Ruel Brathwaite (2006): RMR Brathwaite
- David Brown (2005): DO Brown
- Michael Brown (2001–2002): MJ Brown

== C ==
- Russell Cake (1996): RQ Cake
- Mark Chilton (1997–1998): MJ Chilton
- Richard Clinton (2006): RS Clinton
- Ed Cowan (2003): EJM Cowan

== D ==
- Lee Daggett (2004): LM Daggett
- Jamie Dalrymple (2001–2002): JWM Dalrymple
- Michael Davies (1997–1998): MK Davies
- Ismail Dawood (2003–2004): I Dawood
- Richard Dawson (2000): RKJ Dawson
- Richard Dibden (1996): RR Dibden
- Ryan Driver (1999): RC Driver

== E ==
- Alex Edwards (1997): AD Edwards
- Scott Ellis (1996): SWK Ellis
- Christopher Elstub (2001): CJ Elstub
- Matthew Evans (1996): MR Evans

== F ==
- Rob Ferley (2001–2003): RS Ferley
- James Ford (1997): JA Ford
- James Foster (2000–2001): JS Foster
- John Francis (2002–2003): JD Francis
- Simon Francis (1998–1999): SRG Francis
- Gavin Franklin (2000): GD Franklin
- Matthew Friedlander (2005): MJ Friedlander

== G ==
- Chinmay Gupte (1996): CM Gupte

== H ==
- Mark Hardinges (2000): MA Hardinges
- Paul Harrison (2006): PW Harrison
- Mark Harvey (1996): ME Harvey
- Christopher Hellings (1999): CJ Hellings
- Tom Hicks (1999): TC Hicks
- Tim Hodgson (1997): TP Hodgson
- Will House (1996–1998): WJ House
- Quentin Hughes (1999): QJ Hughes
- Ben Hutton (1998–1999): BL Hutton

== I ==
- Imraan Mohammad (1999): Imraan Mohammad

== J ==
- Will Jefferson (2000–2002): WI Jefferson
- Steffan Jones (1997): PS Jones

== K ==
- Gul Khan (1996): GA Khan
- Josh Knappett (2005–2006): JPT Knappett

== L ==
- Nick Lamb (2006): NJ Lamb
- James Lawrence (1998–1999): JRG Lawrence
- David Leather (1998–1999): D Leather
- Tim Linley (2004): TE Linley
- Greg Loveridge (1998–1999): GR Loveridge

== M ==
- Alistair Maiden (2005): AJ Maiden
- Kervin Marc (1996): K Marc
- Simon Marshall (2004): SJ Marshall
- Robin Martin-Jenkins (1996–1998): RSC Martin-Jenkins
- Paul McMahon (2004): PJ McMahon
- Tom Mees (2003): T Mees
- James Morris (2006): JC Morris
- Tim Murtagh (2000–2003): TJ Murtagh

== N ==
- Chris Nash (2004): CD Nash

== P ==
- Tony Palladino (2005): AP Palladino
- Monty Panesar (2002–2005): MS Panesar
- Luke Parker (2005–2006): LC Parker
- Charles Pimlott (2000): CR Pimlott
- Joe Porter (2000–2002): JJ Porter
- James Pyemont (1998–2001): JP Pyemont

== R ==
- Umer Rashid (1996–1997): UBA Rashid
- Glen Read (2005): GG Read
- Mali Richards (2006): MA Richards
- Andrew Ridley (1996): AC Ridley
- Timothy Roberts (1999): TW Roberts

== S ==
- Damian Shirazi (2004–2006): DC Shirazi
- Anurag Singh (1996–1998): A Singh
- Ed Smith (1997–1998): ET Smith
- Will Smith (2004–2005): WR Smith
- Andrew Strauss (1997–1998): AJ Strauss
- Amit Suman (2005): AK Suman
- Iain Sutcliffe (1996): IJ Sutcliffe
- Luke Sutton (1998): LD Sutton

== T ==
- Delroy Taylor (2003): DB Taylor
- James Tomlinson (2002–2003): JA Tomlinson
- Mark Tournier (2000–2002): MA Tournier

== W ==
- Mark Wagh (1996–1998): MA Wagh
- David Wainwright (2006): DJ Wainwright
- Rob White (2003): RA White
- Andy Whittall (1996): AR Whittall
- David Wigley (2004): DH Wigley
- Elliott Wilson (1999): EJ Wilson
