= Durham UCCE in 2005 =

Durham UCCE
2005 season

The British cricket team Durham UCCE played three first-class games in 2005. They started their first-class season on a batting paradise in Taunton, which secured them their first draw of the year. Thanks to a painfully slow innings against Leicestershire, they drew their second game. Their third and final first-class match of the year was also a draw, although a close one - they finished with nine wickets down in the second innings.

== Players ==
- W R Smith
- A J Maiden
- W F Burnell
- D O Brown
- M A P Dale
- M J Phythian
- T O Bruce
- D J F Shilvock
- D J Balcombe
- L M Daggett
- G G Read

== Somerset v Durham UCCE (9-11 April) ==
Match drawn

At Taunton, the first day of the season for these two teams made up Somerset's first innings. In 105 overs Somerset made a mammoth 580 for 5 declared. Ian Blackwell contributed 191, John Francis 123 and Matthew Wood 95 as Durham UCCE struggled. Francis and Wood's partnership is a new record fifth-wicket partnership for Somerset, beating the 235 put on by Box Case and Jack White in 1927. Somerset declared on their overnight total. However, on a good pitch, Durham UCCE fared well, making a mammoth 304 for the first wicket, and were 327 for 1 at close on the second day. Will Smith scored 156 and Alistair Maiden 211 not out before Durham UCCE were able to declare on 433 for 4, 147 behind. Also, this was against a first-class attack including Andy Caddick and Nixon McLean. Somerset chose to bat out the rest of the day for a draw, finishing on 211 for 2 declared, with John Francis scoring 112. (Cricinfo scorecard)

== Leicestershire v Durham UCCE (27-29 April) ==
Match drawn

Leicestershire batted first at Grace Road, and Darren Maddy made the most of his chance against the students. He has scored only one Championship ton in the last two seasons, but got to 124 on the first day. At close, Leicestershire were on 288 for 3. On the second day, they declared on 384 for 4. Durham UCCE went slowly. David Brown finished the day, having batted for over 4 hours and through 237 balls to get an undefeated 68. But after being reduced to 12 for 3, that's exactly what the students needed. They finished on 169 for 6 off 79 overs, 216 behind, but well on the way towards saving the game. On the third day, Durham UCCE went on to score 255 thanks to 73 from David Balcombe, avoiding the follow-on and saving the game. It was only batting practice from there with Leicestershire ending on 187 for 4. (BBC scorecard)

== Durham UCCE v Durham (25-27 May) ==
Match drawn

Despite Durham fielding a near first-string line-up, they were nowhere near dominant against the students, Durham making 277 on the first day after David Balcombe took five for 112. In reply, the students made 228 for 9 declared, after two bursts from New Zealand international Nathan Astle. Astle took three for 20, the best bowling figures, making up for his 11 in the first innings. Durham then scored reasonably quick runs, but the game were still heading towards a draw, as Durham were leading by 180 runs at stumps on day two with 8 wickets in hand. Durham made a good go at winning the match, though, making 258 for 7 declared to set the students 308 in 74 overs. With Gareth Breese (3-86) and Graeme Bridge (4-54) taking student wickets at regular intervals, it wasn't enough, as they finished 261 for 9 - 47 runs and one wicket short of a result. (Cricinfo scorecard)
