= William Dobson (disambiguation) =

William Dobson was an English Baroque painter of the 17th century.

William or Will Dobson may also refer to:

- William Dobson (academic) (1650–1731), English academic, president of Trinity College, Oxford
- William Polk Dobson (1793–1846), American politician, state senator for Surry County, North Carolina
- William Charles Thomas Dobson (1817–1898), English painter
- William Dobson (antiquary) (1820–1884), English journalist and antiquary
- William Lambert Dobson (1833–1898), Australian judge and politician
- William J. Dobson (born 1973), American journalist
- William Dobson (rugby union), Scottish international rugby union player
- Will Dobson (cricketer) (born 1986), English cricketer
- Will Dobson (soccer) (born 2007), Australian soccer player

== See also ==
- SS William A. Dobson, liberty ships (1944)
