= Ben Williams =

Ben Williams may refer to:

== Arts and entertainment ==
- Ben Williams (actor) (1892–1959), British actor of the 1940s
- Ben Williams (musician) (born 1984), American jazz bassist
- Ben Ames Williams (1899–1953), American writer
- Ben Williams (Family Affairs), character in UK soap opera Family Affairs

== Sports ==
=== Association football ===
- Ben Williams (footballer, born 1900) (1900–1968), Swansea Town, Everton and Wales international footballer
- Ben Williams (footballer, born 1982), English football
- Ben Williams (footballer, born 1999), Welsh footballer
- Ben Williams (referee) (born 1977), Australian soccer referee

=== Other sports ===
- Ben Williams (American football, born 1954) (1954–2020), American football defensive lineman
- Ben Williams (American football, born 1970), American football defensive lineman
- Ben Williams (rugby union, born 1989), English rugby union player
- Ben Williams (rugby union, born 2002), Welsh rugby union player
- Ben Williams (triple jumper) (born 1992), British triple jumper
- Ben Williams (cricketer, born 1992), English banker and cricketer
- Ben Williams (cricketer, born 1993), English cricketer

== Others ==
- Ben H. Williams (1877–1964), Industrial Workers of the World leader
- Ben T. Williams (1910–1982), Oklahoma Supreme Court judge
- Ben Clarence Williams (1914–1970), member of the Florida House of Representatives

== See also ==
- Benjamin Williams (disambiguation)
- Benny Williams (disambiguation)
