= Tim Alexander =

Tim Alexander may refer to:

- Timothy Alexander (born 1949), Australian sailor
- Tim Alexander (drummer) (born 1965), American musician (drummer for Primus)
- Tim Alexander (politician) (born 1966), American attorney, former law enforcement officer, and Democratic candidate for New Jersey's 2nd congressional district (nominee in both 2022 and 2024)
- Tim Alexander (footballer) (born 1973), English footballer
- Tim Alexander (cricketer) (born 1994), English cricketer
- Tim Alexander (visual effects), Academy Award–nominated visual effects supervisor
