= Adam Dewes =

English cricketer

Personal information
- Full name: Adam Herbert John Dewes
- Born: November 1996 (age 30); Ascot, Berkshire, England
- Batting: Right-handed
- Bowling: Slow left-arm orthodox
- Relatives: John Dewes (grandfather) Jim Dewes (father) Jonathan Dewes (brother)

Domestic team information
- Years: Team
- 2019: Durham MCCU
- 2018: Berkshire

Career statistics
Competition	First-class
Matches	2
Runs scored	11
Batting average	3.66
100s/50s	–/–
Top score	6
Balls bowled	132
Wickets	3
Bowling average	25.00
5 wickets in innings	–
10 wickets in match	–
Best bowling	1/1
Catches/stumpings	1/–
- Source: Cricinfo, 8 August 2020

Adam Herbert John Dewes (born November 1996) is an English former first-class cricketer.

Dewes was born in Ascot in November 1996. He was educated at Wellington College, before going up to Durham University. While studying at Durham, he played two first-class cricket matches for Durham MCCU against Durham and Northamptonshire in 2019. Playing as a slow left-arm orthodox bowler, he took 3 wickets in his two matches. In addition to playing first-class cricket, Dewes has also played minor counties cricket for Berkshire.
