= Blackaby =

Blackaby is a surname. Notable people with the surname include:

- Ethan Blackaby (1940–2022), American baseball player
- Henry Blackaby (1935–2024), American Christian writer and pastor
- Luke Blackaby (born 1991), English cricketer
