= William Kirby =

William Kirby may refer to:

- William Kirby (entomologist) (1759–1850), English entomologist
- William Kirby (author) (1817–1906), Canadian author
- William C. Kirby (born 1950), professor at Harvard University
- William F. Kirby (1867–1934), American politician
- William Forsell Kirby (1844–1912), English entomologist & folklorist
- William T. Kirby (1911–1990), businessman
- William Kirby (Gaelic footballer) (fl. 1990s–2010s), Gaelic footballer
- William Kirby (footballer, born 1883) (1883–1917), English footballer
- William Kirby (cricketer) (born 1981), English cricketer
- Bill Kirby (born 1975), Australian swimmer
- Cam Kirby or William J. Cameron Kirby (1909–2003), Canadian politician
