= International cricket in 1911 =

International cricket season

The 1911 International cricket season was from April 1911 to August 1911.

== Season overview ==
International tours
Start date	Home team	Away team	Results [Matches]			
Start date	Home team	Away team	Test	ODI	FC	LA
1 June 1911	England	England Rest	—	—	0–0 [1]	—
8 June 1911	England	India	—	—	1–0 [1]	—
July 1911	Netherlands	Belgium	—	—	1–0 [1]	—
20 July 1911	Ireland	Scotland	—	—	0–0 [1]	—
3 August 1911	Scotland	India	—	—	0–0 [1]	—

== June ==
=== Test trial in England ===
Three-day match series
No.	Date	Home captain	Away captain	Venue	Result
Match 1	1–3 June	Gilbert Jessop	Pelham Warner	Bramall Lane, Sheffield	Jessop's XI by 162 runs
Match 2	29 Jun–1 July	Pelham Warner	Gilbert Jessop	Lord's, London	England by 10 wickets
Match 3	26–28 August	Not mentioned	Not mentioned	Old Trafford Cricket Ground, Manchester	Match cancelled

=== All India in England ===
Two-day match
No.	Date	Home captain	Away captain	Venue	Result
Match	8–9 June	Not mentioned	Bhupinder Singh	Lord's, London	Marylebone by an innings and 168 runs

== July ==
=== Netherlands in Belgium ===
First-class match
No.	Date	Home captain	Away captain	Venue	Result
Match	July	Not mentioned	Not mentioned	Antwerp	Belgium by 33 runs

=== Ireland in Scotland ===
Three-day match
No.	Date	Home captain	Away captain	Venue	Result
Match	20–22 July	Mark Thorburn	Bob Lambert	Hamilton Crescent, Glasgow	Match drawn

== August ==
=== India in Scotland ===
Three-day match
No.	Date	Home captain	Away captain	Venue	Result
Match	3–5 August	Not mentioned	Not mentioned	Mossilee, Galashiels	Match drawn
