= Lewis Bedford =

Lewis Bedford may refer to:

- Lewis Bedford (footballer) (1899–1966), English footballer
- Lewis Bedford (cricketer) (born 1999), English cricketer
