= Benny Williams =

Benny Williams may refer to:

- Benny Williams (musician) (1931–2007)
- Benny Williams (basketball) (born 2002)
- Benny Williams (footballer) (born 1951)

== See also ==
- Ben Williams (disambiguation)
- Benjamin Williams (disambiguation)
