= Will Buttleman =

English cricketer (born 2000)

Personal information
- Full name: William Edward Lewis Buttleman
- Born: 20 April 2000 (age 26); Chelmsford, Essex, England
- Batting: Right-handed
- Bowling: Right-arm off break
- Role: Wicket-keeper
- Relatives: Joe Buttleman (brother)

Domestic team information
- Years: Team
- 2019–2023: Essex (squad no. 9)
- First-class debut: 3 June 2019 Essex v Yorkshire
- List A debut: 22 July 2021 Essex v Hampshire

Career statistics
Competition	FC	LA	T20
Matches	5	15	21
Runs scored	141	202	289
Batting average	20.14	16.83	18.06
100s/50s	0/1	0/1	0/1
Top score	65	50*	56*
Catches/stumpings	19/1	11/0	7/1
- Source: Cricinfo, 23 August 2023

William Edward Lewis Buttleman (born 20 April 2000) is an English cricketer, who bats right-handed and bowls right-arm off break. He represented Essex County Cricket Club in English domestic cricket. He completed his secondary education at Felsted School. His brother Joe Buttleman is also an English cricketer, who played for Durham MCC University.

He made his first-class debut on 3 June 2019, for Essex in the 2019 County Championship. He made his Twenty20 debut on June 11, 2021, for Essex in the 2021 T20 Blast. He made his List A debut on 22 July 2021, for Essex in the 2021 Royal London One-Day Cup. He was released by Essex at the end of the 2023 season.
