= Jack Wood =

Jack Wood can refer to:

- Jack Wood (referee) (1872–1921), English footballer and referee
- Leo Wood (1882–1929), American songwriter sometimes known as Jack Wood
- Jack Wood (footballer) (1889–1914), Australian rules footballer
- Jack Wood (director) (1924–2007), American television director
- Jack Wood (English cricketer) (born 1994), English cricketer
- Jack Wood (Australian cricketer) (born 1996), Australian cricketer
- Jack Wood (racing driver) (born 2000), American racing driver
