= Christopher Prowting =

English cricketer (born 1988)

Personal information
- Full name: Christopher George Prowting
- Born: 2 June 1988 (age 38); Chelmsford, Essex, England
- Batting: Right-handed
- Role: Wicket-keeper
- Relatives: Nick Prowting (brother)

Domestic team information
- Years: Team
- 2007: Marylebone Cricket Club

Career statistics
Competition	First-class
Matches	1
Runs scored	50
Batting average	25.00
100s/50s	–/–
Top score	48
Balls bowled	0
Wickets	–
Bowling average	–
5 wickets in innings	–
10 wickets in match	–
Best bowling	–
Catches/stumpings	–/–
- Source: Cricinfo, 27 October 2018

Christopher George Prowting (born 2 June 1988) is a former English first-class cricketer.

Born at Chelmsford, Prowting played Second XI cricket for Essex from 2004–2007, though he was unable to force his way into the first eleven. He made a single appearance in first-class cricket for the Marylebone Cricket Club against Sri Lanka A at Arundel. Keeping wicket in the match, Prowting scored 2 runs in the MCC first-innings, before being dismissed by Rangana Herath, while in their second-innings he was dismissed by Dilruwan Perera for 48.

His brother, Nick Prowting, played first-class cricket for Durham UCCE.
