= Mumtaz Habib =

Afghan former cricketer

Personal information
- Full name: Mumtaz Habib
- Born: 1 January 1987 (age 39); Kabul, Kabul Province, Afghanistan
- Nickname: None
- Height: 183 cm (6 ft 0 in)
- Batting: Right-handed
- Bowling: Right-arm medium-fast

Domestic team information
- Years: Team
- 2006-2008: Durham UCCE

Career statistics
| Competition | First-class |
|---|---|
| Matches | 3 |
| Runs scored | 20 |
| Batting average | 6.66 |
| 100s/50s | –/– |
| Top score | 10 |
| Balls bowled | 384 |
| Wickets | 4 |
| Bowling average | 58.52 |
| 5 wickets in innings | – |
| 10 wickets in match | – |
| Best bowling | 3/92 |
| Catches/stumpings | 1/– |
- Source: Cricinfo, 25 September 2010

Mumtaz Habib is an Afghan former cricketer who played for Durham MCC University between 2006 and 2008. Habib was a right-handed batsman who bowled right-arm medium-fast.

He was born in Kabul, Afghanistan and spent his early life in Quetta, Pakistan before moving to the United Kingdom.

== Early life ==
Habib's parents paid for him to smuggled out of Afghanistan in 2000 after the Taliban tried to force him to join their militia. His father, Habib Khan, had served King Zahir Shah. He was sent to Britain, along with his younger brother, where they lived with their sister in Harrow. He was initially educated at Rooks Heath College, where he learned to speak English, studied well and was made deputy head boy.

His cricketing skills caught the eye of Harrow's cricket master when he was practising at an indoor cricket centre owned by Harrow School. Habib was then asked to practice with the Harrow schoolboys and eventually he was offered a full bursary to cover the school's then fees of £20,985 a year. Passing nine GCSEs just two years after learning English, he was later educated at Durham University.

== First-class cricket ==
He made his first-class debut in England for Durham UCCE against Nottinghamshire, making him the first Afghan to play first-class cricket in England, and the second Afghan born cricketer after Salim Durani to play first-class cricket. His second first-class match came in the same season against Lancashire. He played his third and final first-class match in 2008 against Lancashire. In his 3 first-class matches, he scored 20 runs at a batting average of 6.66, with a high score of 10. In the field he took a single catch. With the ball he took 4 wickets at a bowling average of 58.52, with best figures of 3/92.
