= Peter Howells (cricketer) =

English cricketer (born 1981)

Personal information
- Full name: Peter William Howells
- Born: 9 October 1981 (age 45); Stockton-on-Tees, County Durham, England
- Batting: Right-handed
- Role: Wicket-keeper

Domestic team information
- Years: Team
- 2004–2005: Durham UCCE

Career statistics
Competition	First-class
Matches	4
Runs scored	111
Batting average	27.75
100s/50s	–/1
Top score	51*
Balls bowled	–
Wickets	–
Bowling average	–
5 wickets in innings	–
10 wickets in match	–
Best bowling	–
Catches/stumpings	9/–
- Source: Cricinfo, 21 August 2011

Peter William Howells (born 9 August 1981) is an English cricketer. Howells is a right-handed batsman who fields as a wicket-keeper. He was born in Stockton-on-Tees, County Durham.

While studying for his degree at Durham University, Howells made his first-class debut for Durham UCCE against Durham in 2004. He made three further first-class appearances for the university, the last of which came against Durham in 2005. In his four first-class matches, he scored 111 runs at an average of 27.75, with a high score of 51 not out. This score, his only first-class fifty, came against Durham in 2005.
