= George Harper (cricketer, born 1988) =

Personal information
- Full name: George Michael Harper
- Born: 5 December 1988 (age 37); Minnesota, United States
- Nickname: Harps
- Batting: Right-handed
- Bowling: Left-arm medium-fast

Domestic team information
- Years: Team
- 2009–2010: Durham UCCE
- 2008–present: Buckinghamshire

Career statistics
Competition	First-class
Matches	3
Runs scored	3
Batting average	1.00
100s/50s	–/–
Top score	3
Balls bowled	383
Wickets	6
Bowling average	49.50
5 wickets in innings	–
10 wickets in match	–
Best bowling	4/49
Catches/stumpings	–/–
- Source: Cricinfo, 4 May 2011

George Michael Harper (born 5 December 1988) is an American born English cricketer. Harper is a right-handed batsman who bowls left-arm medium-fast. He was born in Minnesota and educated at Harrow School, before undertaking studies at Durham University and Potchefstroom University.

Harper joined Buckinghamshire in 2008, making his Minor Counties Championship debut against Cumberland. He has made 13 further appearances for the county in that competition and 4 MCCA Knockout Trophy matches. Harper made his first-class debut for Loughborough UCCE against Warwickshire in 2009 at The Racecourse, Durham. On debut he made a pair, but did take 4 wickets in the Warwickshire first-innings. He played a further two first-class fixtures in 2010, against Nottinghamshire and Durham. In his three first-class matches, he took 6 wickets at a bowling average of 49.50, with best figures 4/49.
