= Hugo Loudon =

English cricketer (born 1978)

Hugo John Hope Loudon (born 11 December 1978) is a former English cricketer. A right-handed batsman and slow left-arm bowler, he made three first-class appearances for Durham University Centre of Cricketing Excellence and two List A appearances for the Kent Cricket Board.

He is the older brother of Alex Loudon, who played a single One Day International for England in 2006.
