= Harry McInley =

English cricketer (born 1993)

Personal information
- Full name: Harry Peter Stuart McInley
- Born: 10 August 1993 (age 33); Redhill, Surrey, England
- Batting: Right-handed
- Bowling: Right-arm medium

Domestic team information
- Years: Team
- 2015: Durham MCCU

Career statistics
Competition	First-class
Matches	2
Runs scored	12
Batting average	6.00
100s/50s	–/–
Top score	8
Balls bowled	172
Wickets	1
Bowling average	153.00
5 wickets in innings	–
10 wickets in match	–
Best bowling	1/30
Catches/stumpings	3/–
- Source: Cricinfo, 9 August 2020

Harry Peter Stuart McInley (10 August 1993) is an English former first-class cricketer.

McInley was born at Redhill in August 1993. He was educated at Caterham School, before going up to Hatfield College, Durham. While studying at Durham, he played two first-class cricket matches for Durham MCCU against Somerset and Durham in 2015. He scored 12 runs in his two matches, in addition to taking a single wicket with his right-arm medium pace bowling.
