= Daniel Shilvock =

English cricketer

Personal information
- Full name: Daniel James Francis Shilvock
- Born: 22 November 1983 (age 42); Birmingham, Warwickshire, England
- Batting: Right-handed
- Bowling: Leg break

Domestic team information
- Years: Team
- 2006–present: Berkshire
- 2005: Herefordshire
- 2005–2006: Durham UCCE

Career statistics
Competition	First-class
Matches	2
Runs scored	15
Batting average	15.00
100s/50s	–/–
Top score	15
Balls bowled	102
Wickets	3
Bowling average	41.33
5 wickets in innings	–
10 wickets in match	–
Best bowling	2/77
Catches/stumpings	–/–
- Source: Cricinfo, 20 August 2011

Daniel James Francis Shilvock (born 22 November 1983) is an English cricketer. Shilvock is a right-handed batsman who bowls leg break. He was born in Birmingham, Warwickshire.

While studying for his degree at Durham University, Shilvock made his first-class debut for Durham UCCE against Somerset in 2005. That same year he was selected, alongside Alistair Maiden, to train with the World Cricket Academy in India. He made a further first-class appearance in 2006, against Surrey. In his two first-class matches for the university, he took 3 wickets at an average of 41.33, with best figures of 2/77. With the bat, he scored 15 runs.

Shilvock has also played Minor counties cricket, starting with Herefordshire who he made three Minor Counties Championship appearances for in 2005. For the 2006 season, he joined Berkshire. To date, he has made 14 Minor Counties Championship appearances and a single MCCA Knockout Trophy appearance.
