= Robbie Williams (cricketer) =

English cricketer (born 1987)

Personal information
- Full name: Robert Edward Morgan Williams
- Born: 19 January 1987 (age 39); Pembury, Kent, England
- Height: 6 ft 0 in (1.83 m)
- Batting: Right-handed
- Bowling: Right-arm medium-fast

Domestic team information
- Years: Team
- 2007–2009: Durham UCCE
- 2007–2012: Middlesex (squad no. 13)
- 2013: Leicestershire
- 2014: Berkshire

Career statistics
Competition	FC	LA	T20
Matches	15	15	5
Runs scored	160	11	0
Batting average	10.66	11.00	0.00
100s/50s	0/0	0/0	0/0
Top score	31	5	0
Balls bowled	2,112	552	84
Wickets	33	8	1
Bowling average	38.66	80.12	129.00
5 wickets in innings	2	0	0
10 wickets in match	0	0	0
Best bowling	5/70	3/34	1/32
Catches/stumpings	5/–	2/–	0/–
- Source: Cricinfo, 27 January 2025

Robert Edward Morgan Williams (born 19 January 1987) is an English former professional cricketer.

Born at Pembury in Kent, Williams made his first-class debut for Durham University Centre of Cricketing Excellence in three matches during 2007 as a six-foot right-arm medium-fast bowler, before impressing for the Middlesex second XI. He made his List A and County Championship debuts for Middlesex in September 2007. Opening the bowling with Steven Finn versus Essex, he achieved the distinction of taking five wickets in his first innings in county cricket. He dismissed Tom Westley, Tim Phillips, Essex captain Mark Pettini, Graham Napier and centurion Grant Flower. His figures were 28.4-4-112-5.

Williams signed for Leicestershire on a one-year deal at the end of the 2012 domestic season, after being released by Middlesex.

== Career best performances ==
	Batting				Bowling (innings)			
	Score	Fixture	Venue	Season	Figures	Fixture	Venue	Season
First-class	31	Durham UCCE v Lancashire	Durham	2009	5/70	Durham UCCE v Lancashire	Durham	2007
List A	5	Leicestershire v Gloucestershire	Bristol	2013	3/34	Leicestershire v Gloucestershire	Leicester	2013
Twenty20	0	Leicestershire v Derbyshire	Derby	2013	1/32	Leicestershire v Derbyshire	Leicester	2013
