= Hugo Darby =

English cricketer

Personal information
- Full name: Hugo Richard Hilton Darby
- Born: 5 October 1993 (age 33); Kensington, London, England
- Batting: Right-handed
- Bowling: Right-arm medium-fast

Domestic team information
- Years: Team
- 2014: Durham MCCU
- 2014–2016: Oxfordshire

Career statistics
Competition	First-class
Matches	2
Runs scored	6
Batting average	2.00
100s/50s	–/–
Top score	3
Catches/stumpings	–/–
- Source: Cricinfo, 24 June 2019

Hugo Richard Hilton Darby (born 5 October 1993) is an English former first-class cricketer.

Darby was born at Kensington in October 1993. He was educated at Bradfield College, before going up to Durham University. While studying at Durham he played first-class cricket for Durham MCCU from 2009–11, making two appearances against Derbyshire and Durham. In addition to playing first-class cricket, Darby also played minor counties cricket for Oxfordshire between 2009–13, making fifteen appearances in the Minor Counties Championship, alongside eleven and four appearances in the MCCA Knockout Trophy and Minor Counties Twenty20 respectively.
