= Patrick Foster =

Kenyan-born English cricketer

Personal information
- Full name: Patrick John Foster
- Born: 20 March 1987 (age 39); Nairobi, Kenya
- Batting: Right-handed
- Bowling: Right-arm medium-fast

Domestic team information
- Years: Team
- 2007–2009: Durham UCCE
- 2013: Oxfordshire

Career statistics
Competition	First-class
Matches	9
Runs scored	97
Batting average	6.92
100s/50s	–/–
Top score	24
Balls bowled	1,403
Wickets	24
Bowling average	32.20
5 wickets in innings	–
10 wickets in match	–
Best bowling	4/26
Catches/stumpings	6/–
- Source: Cricinfo, 23 June 2019

Patrick John Foster (born 20 March 1987) is a Kenyan-born English former first-class cricketer.

Foster was born at Nairobi in March 1987, spending the first six years of his life living in the Rift Valley town of Gilgil. His parents ran the independent Pembroke House School. His parents returned to England when he was six, with Foster attending Oundle School. From there he went to Durham University, where he studied social sciences. While at Durham he made his debut in first-class cricket for Durham UCCE against Nottinghamshire at Durham in 2007. He played first-class cricket for Durham UCCE until 2009, having made a total of nine first-class appearances. He scored 97 runs in his nine matches, with a high score of 24. With his right-arm medium-fast bowling, he took 24 wickets at an average of 32.20, with best figures of 4 for 26. He later played minor counties cricket for Oxfordshire, making one appearance against Cornwall in the 2013 MCCA Knockout Trophy.

Following his graduation Foster found work in the City of London, where he developed a severe gambling addiction. Having borrowed money and reached desperation, he attempted to win back all his losses by staking £50,000 on a single horse - "when it lost, he accepted his life was over". His addiction led to him contemplating suicide. With help from the Professional Cricketers' Association he was able to stop his addiction. He now works to raise awareness about gambling addictions. He is an ambassador for the Mintridge Foundation, which seeks to promote an active lifestyle for children and young people.

== Personal life ==
Foster married Charlotte in 2019.

== Selected works ==
Patrick Foster: Might Bite: the secret life of a gambling addict Bloomsbury, London, 3 February 2022
