= Darrel Williams (cricketer) =

English cricketer (born 1995)

Personal information
- Full name: Darrel Ryan Williams
- Born: 21 September 1995 (age 31); Banbury, Oxfordshire, England
- Batting: Right-handed
- Bowling: Leg break

Domestic team information
- Years: Team
- 2015–2017: Durham MCCU

Career statistics
Competition	First-class
Matches	2
Runs scored	32
Batting average	32.00
100s/50s	–/–
Top score	32
Balls bowled	252
Wickets	3
Bowling average	75.33
5 wickets in innings	–
10 wickets in match	–
Best bowling	2/82
Catches/stumpings	2/–
- Source: Cricinfo, 11 August 2020

Darrel Ryan Williams (born 21 September 1995) is an English former first-class cricketer.

Williams was born at Banbury in September 1995. He was educated at Chipping Campden School, before going up to Durham University. While studying at Durham, he played two first-class cricket matches for Durham MCCU against Somerset in 2015 and Essex in 2017. He scored 32 runs in his two matches, while with his leg break bowling he took 3 wickets, with best figures of 2 for 82.
