= Will Phillips (cricketer) =

English cricketer

Personal information
- Full name: William David Beauclerk Phillips
- Born: 12 April 1993 (age 33); Auckland, New Zealand
- Batting: Right-handed
- Bowling: Right-arm fast

Domestic team information
- Years: Team
- 2015–2016: Durham MCCU

Career statistics
Competition	First-class
Matches	3
Runs scored	33
Batting average	8.25
100s/50s	–/–
Top score	14
Balls bowled	360
Wickets	7
Bowling average	38.85
5 wickets in innings	–
10 wickets in match	–
Best bowling	3/45
Catches/stumpings	1/–
- Source: Cricinfo, 9 August 2020

William David Beauclerk Phillips (born 12 April 1993) is a New Zealand-born English former first-class cricketer.

Phillips was born at Auckland in April 1993. Moving to England, he later studied at Grey College, Durham. While studying at Durham, he made three appearances in first-class cricket for Durham MCCU, playing against Durham in 2015 and Gloucestershire and Durham in 2016. He scored 33 runs in his three matches, with a high score of 14. With his right-arm fast pace bowler, he took 7 wickets at an average of 38.85, with best figures of 3 for 45.
