= Neil Longhurst =

English cricketer (born 1984)

Personal information
- Full name: Neil James Longhurst
- Born: 21 November 1984 (age 41); Rotherham, Yorkshire, England
- Batting: Left-handed
- Bowling: Right-arm medium-fast

Domestic team information
- Years: Team
- 2004: Durham UCCE

Career statistics
Competition	First-class
Matches	2
Runs scored	61
Batting average	20.33
100s/50s	–/–
Top score	29
Balls bowled	–
Wickets	–
Bowling average	–
5 wickets in innings	–
10 wickets in match	–
Best bowling	–
Catches/stumpings	2/–
- Source: Cricinfo, 21 August 2011

Neil James Longhurst (born 21 November 1984) is an English cricketer. Longhurst is a left-handed batsman who bowls right-arm medium-fast. He was born in Rotherham, Yorkshire.

Longhurst studied at Durham University. He was a member of John Snow College alongside fellow cricketer Justin Bishop. As a student, he made his first-class debut for Durham UCCE against Northamptonshire in 2004. He made a further first-class appearance in 2004, against Derbyshire. In his two first-class matches, he scored 61 runs at an average of 20.33, with a high score of 29.
