= Sean Parry =

Hong Kong cricketer (born 1987)

Personal information
- Full name: Sean Jonathan Pryce Parry
- Born: 1 June 1987 (age 39); Kowloon, Hong Kong
- Batting: Right-handed
- Bowling: Right-arm medium
- Relatives: Mother: Lydia Parry. Sisters: Claire, Katherine and Alipally

Domestic team information
- Years: Team
- 2006: Durham UCCE

Career statistics
Competition	First-class
Matches	1
Runs scored	66
Batting average	33.00
100s/50s	–/–
Top score	36
Balls bowled	–
Wickets	–
Bowling average	–
5 wickets in innings	–
10 wickets in match	–
Best bowling	–
Catches/stumpings	–/–
- Source: Cricinfo, 20 August 2011

Sean Jonathan Pryce Parry (born 1 June 1987) is a Hong Kong cricketer. Parry is a right-handed batsman who bowls right-arm medium pace. He was born in Kowloon, Hong Kong.

While studying for his degree at Durham University, Parry made a single first-class appearance for Durham UCCE against Lancashire in 2006. He scored 36 runs in the university's first-innings, before being dismissed by Gary Keedy, while in their second-innings he was dismissed for 30 runs by Simon Marshall.
