= Ollie Steele =

English cricketer

Personal information
- Full name: Oliver James Steele
- Born: 15 October 1993 (age 33); Worcester, Worcestershire, England
- Batting: Right-handed
- Role: Wicket-keeper

Domestic team information
- Years: Team
- 2013–2015: Durham MCCU

Career statistics
Competition	First-class
Matches	6
Runs scored	175
Batting average	35.00
100s/50s	–/1
Top score	53*
Catches/stumpings	4/–
- Source: Cricinfo, 11 August 2020

Oliver James Steele (born 15 October 1993) is an English former first-class cricketer.

Steele was born at Worcester in October 1993. He was educated in Worcester at Royal Grammar School, before going up to Collingwood College, Durham. While studying at Durham, he made six appearances in first-class cricket for Durham MCCU in 2013–15. Playing as a wicket-keeper, Steele scored a total of 175 at an average of 35.00, with a high score of 53 not out which he made against Durham in 2014.
