= Tom Bartram =

English cricketer

Personal information
- Full name: Thomas Stephen Bartram
- Born: 11 February 1986 (age 40); York, North Yorkshire, England
- Batting: Right-handed
- Bowling: Right-arm medium-fast

Domestic team information
- Years: Team
- 2006: Durham UCCE

Career statistics
Competition	First-class
Matches	2
Runs scored	4
Batting average	4.00
100s/50s	–/–
Top score	2*
Balls bowled	192
Wickets	3
Bowling average	48.33
5 wickets in innings	–
10 wickets in match	–
Best bowling	2/84
Catches/stumpings	–/–
- Source: Cricinfo, 20 August 2011

Thomas Stephen Bartram (born 11 February 1986) is an English cricketer. Bartram is a right-handed batsman who bowls right-arm medium-fast. He was born in York, Yorkshire.

While studying for his degree at Durham University, Bartram made his first-class debut for Durham UCCE against Surrey in 2006. He made a further first-class appearance for the university in 2006, against Lancashire. In his two first-class matches, he took 3 wickets at an average of 48.33, with best figures of 2/84.
