= Matt Green (cricketer) =

English cricketer

Personal information
- Full name: Matthew James Emrys Green
- Born: 19 April 1993 (age 33); Wakefield, Yorkshire, England
- Batting: Right-handed
- Bowling: Right-arm medium

Domestic team information
- Years: Team
- 2012–2013: Durham MCCU

Career statistics
Competition	First-class
Matches	3
Runs scored	4
Batting average	2.00
100s/50s	–/–
Top score	4
Balls bowled	450
Wickets	4
Bowling average	57.50
5 wickets in innings	–
10 wickets in match	–
Best bowling	2/60
Catches/stumpings	–/–
- Source: Cricinfo, 9 August 2020

Matthew James Emrys Green (born 19 April 1993) is an English former first-class cricketer.

Green was born at Wakefield in April 1993. Moving south to Kent as a child, he was educated at The Skinners' School, before going up to St Cuthbert's Society, Durham. While studying at Durham, he made three appearances in first-class cricket for Durham MCCU, playing against Middlsex and Durham in 2012 and Durham in 2013. Playing as a right-arm slow pace bowler, he took 4 wickets in his three matches at an average of 57.50, with best figures of 2 for 60.
