= Charlie Macdonell =

English cricketer (born 1995)

Personal information
- Full name: Charles Michael Macdonell
- Born: 23 February 1995 (age 31); Basingstoke, Hampshire, England
- Height: 5 ft 10 in (1.78 m)
- Batting: Right-handed
- Bowling: Right-arm off break
- Role: Batting all-rounder

Domestic team information
- Years: Team
- 2014–2015: Buckinghamshire
- 2015–2018: Durham MCCU
- 2016–2017: Derbyshire (squad no. 3)
- First-class debut: 2 April 2015 Durham MCCU v Somerset
- List A debut: 15 July 2016 Derbyshire v Sri Lanka A

Career statistics
Competition	FC	LA
Matches	7	2
Runs scored	347	19
Batting average	49.57	19.00
100s/50s	0/2	0/0
Top score	91	19
Balls bowled	492	–
Wickets	2	–
Bowling average	170.50	–
5 wickets in innings	0	–
10 wickets in match	0	n/a
Best bowling	2/57	–
Catches/stumpings	1/–	0/–
- Source: ESPNcricinfo, 4 April 2018

Charles Michael Macdonell (Note: Some sources, including Cricinfo, list his surname with the variant capitalisation "MacDonell".) (born 23 February 1995) is an English cricketer who has played for Durham MCCU and Derbyshire. Primarily a right-handed batsman, he also bowls right arm off spin.

== Education ==
He was educated at Wellingborough School and studied psychology at Durham University. In 2014 he attended the Darren Lehmann Cricket Academy in Adelaide, Australia.

== Career ==
Macdonell played minor counties cricket for Buckinghamshire, making his debut in 2014. Whilst playing for Durham MCCU, he scored a record number of runs for them against first-class opposition, including 146 against Warwickshire at Edgbaston in 2015 and 109 vs Derbyshire, 91 vs Gloucestershire and 81 vs Durham, all in 2016. He was released from his contract with Derbyshire in order to pursue other career opportunities in March 2018.
