= William Hanson (cricketer) =

English cricketer

Personal information
- Full name: William Thomas Daniel Hanson
- Born: 21 April 1982 (age 44); Leicester, Leicestershire, England
- Batting: Right-handed
- Role: Wicket-keeper

Domestic team information
- Years: Team
- 2006–2007: Devon
- 2003: Durham UCCE

Career statistics
Competition	First-class
Matches	3
Runs scored	13
Batting average	6.50
100s/50s	–/–
Top score	9*
Balls bowled	–
Wickets	–
Bowling average	–
5 wickets in innings	–
10 wickets in match	–
Best bowling	–
Catches/stumpings	5/3
- Source: Cricinfo, 21 August 2011

William Thomas Daniel Hanson (born 21 April 1982) is an English cricketer. Hanson is a right-handed batsman who fields as a wicket-keeper. He was born in Leicester, Leicestershire.

While studying for his degree at Durham University, Hanson made his first-class debut for Durham UCCE against Nottinghamshire in 2003. He made two further first-class appearance in 2003, against Durham and Lancashire. In his three first-class matches, he scored 13 runs at an average of 6.50, with a high score of 9 not out. Behind the stumps he took 5 catches and made a single stumping.

In 2006, he made his debut for Devon in the 2006 MCCA Knockout Trophy against Wales Minor Counties. The following year he made a further appearance for Devon in that competition against Berkshire, which was his final appearance for Devon.

He is currently a sports and cricket coach at St Paul's School, London.
