= Charlie Morgan (cricketer) =

English cricketer

Personal information
- Full name: Charlie Felix Derrington Morgan
- Born: 9 July 1989 (age 37); Leicester, Leicestershire, England
- Height: 6 ft 2 in (1.88 m)
- Batting: Right-handed
- Role: Wicket-keeper

Domestic team information
- Years: Team
- 2010: Durham MCCU
- 2008–2009: Durham UCCE

Career statistics
Competition	First-class
Matches	5
Runs scored	61
Batting average	10.16
100s/50s	–/–
Top score	38
Balls bowled	–
Wickets	–
Bowling average	–
5 wickets in innings	–
10 wickets in match	–
Best bowling	–
Catches/stumpings	5/1
- Source: Cricinfo, 19 August 2011

Charlie Felix Derrington Morgan (born 9 July 1989) is an English sports journalist and former cricketer. Morgan played as a right-handed batsman and fielded as a wicket-keeper. He was born in Leicester, Leicestershire.

While studying for his degree at Durham University, Morgan made his first-class debut for Durham UCCE against Lancashire in 2008. He appeared in two further first-class matches for the university in 2009, against Lancashire and Durham. Two more first-class appearances came in 2010 for the university, by now playing as Durham MCCU following a change of name, against Nottinghamshire and Durham. In his five first-class matches, he scored 61 runs at an average of 10.16, with a high score of 38. Behind the stumps, he took 5 catches and made a single stumping.

In a Daily Telegraph article on South Africa's pace bowling, published on 16 August 2022, Morgan commented that the Wikipedia page dedicated to his brief first-class cricket career contained "a vast overestimation of my height".
