= Joe Emanuel =

English cricketer (born 1998)

Personal information
- Full name: Joseph Francis Emanuel
- Born: October 11, 1998 (age 28); Camden, London, England
- Batting: Right-handed
- Bowling: Left-arm medium-fast

Domestic team information
- Years: Team
- 2019: Durham MCCU

Career statistics
Competition	First-class
Matches	1
Runs scored	20
Batting average	20.00
100s/50s	–/–
Top score	20
Balls bowled	138
Wickets	2
Bowling average	44.50
5 wickets in innings	–
10 wickets in match	–
Best bowling	2/81
Catches/stumpings	–/–
- Source: Cricinfo, 9 August 2020

Joseph Francis Emanuel (born October 1998) is an English former first-class cricketer.

Emanuel was born at Camden in October 1998. He was educated at the City of London School, before going up to Durham University. While studying at Durham, he made a single appearance in first-class cricket for Durham MCCU against Northamptonshire at Northampton in 2019. Batting once in the match, he was dismissed for 20 runs in the Durham MCCU first innings by Blessing Muzarabani, while with his left-arm medium-fast bowling he took 2 wickets in Northamptonshire's first innings, dismissing Rob Newton and Richard Levi to take figures of 2 for 81.
