= Joe Buttleman =

English cricketer

Personal information
- Full name: Joseph Edward Lewis Buttleman
- Born: 23 August 1987 (age 39); Basildon, Essex, England
- Height: 6 ft 3 in (1.91 m)
- Batting: Right-handed
- Bowling: Right-arm fast-medium
- Relatives: Will Buttleman (brother)

Domestic team information
- Years: Team
- 2007–2009: Durham UCCE

Career statistics
Competition	First-class
Matches	7
Runs scored	156
Batting average	14.18
100s/50s	0/1
Top score	56*
Balls bowled	550
Wickets	10
Bowling average	30.90
5 wickets in innings	0
10 wickets in match	0
Best bowling	2/32
Catches/stumpings	2/–
- Source: Cricinfo, 19 August 2011

Joseph Edward Lewis Buttleman (born 23 August 1987) is an English cricketer. Buttleman is a right-handed batsman who bowls right-arm fast-medium. He was born in Basildon, Essex and educated at Felsted School.

While studying for his degree at Durham University, Buttleman made his first-class debut for Durham UCCE against Durham in 2007. He made six further first-class appearances for the university, the last of which came against Warwickshire in 2009. In his seven first-class matches, he scored 156 runs at an average of 14.18, with a high score of 56 not out. This score, his only first-class fifty, came against Lancashire in 2008. With the ball, he took 10 wickets at a bowling average of 30.90, with best figures of 2/32.
