= Cameron Wake (cricketer) =

English cricketer (born 1985)

Personal information
- Full name: Cameron John Wake
- Born: 28 June 1985 (age 41); Kettering, Northamptonshire, England
- Batting: Right-handed
- Bowling: Leg break

Domestic team information
- Years: Team
- 2005: Bedfordshire
- 2006: Cambridgeshire
- 2006: Durham UCCE
- 2008–2013: Bedfordshire

Career statistics
Competition	First-class
Matches	3
Runs scored	47
Batting average	9.40
100s/50s	0/0
Top score	34
Balls bowled	66
Wickets	2
Bowling average	45.00
5 wickets in innings	0
10 wickets in match	0
Best bowling	1/24
Catches/stumpings	1/–
- Source: Cricinfo, 20 August 2011

Cameron John Wake (born 28 June 1985) is an English former cricketer. Wake is a right-handed batsman who bowls leg break. He was born in Kettering, Northamptonshire.

He attended Oundle School and was Captain in 2004. Whilst at School he played for England U17 and Captain England Schools’ U18 as well as appearing in several ECB Development teams. He was contracted to Northamptonshire as an academy player whilst in the 6th Form.

Wake made his debut for Bedfordshire in the 2005 Minor Counties Championship, making two appearances, one each against Norfolk and Cumberland. The following season he made his first-class debut while studying for his degree at Durham University for Durham UCCE against Surrey at the Oval.He made two further first-class appearances against Nottinghamshire and Lancashire. In his three first-class matches, he scored 47 runs at an average of 9.40, with a high score of 34. With the ball, he took 2 wickets at a bowling average of 45.00, with best figures of 1/24.

Toward the tailend of the 2006 season, Wake played three Minor Counties Championship matches for Cambridgeshire, before returning to Bedfordshire in 2008. He made four Minor Counties Championship appearances for the county in that season, but since then has only appeared in MCCA Knockout Trophy matches.

After two years teaching at Sherborne School, where he was the first XI cricket coach, he then spent five years teaching overseas in Dubai, UAE where he played club cricket. Wake returned to the UK in 2022 as a Geography specialist teaching at Repton School where he was appointed Master in charge of cricket.
