= Nick Prowting =

English cricketer (born 1985)

Personal information
- Full name: Nicholas Roger Prowting
- Born: 26 October 1985 (age 41); Chelmsford, Essex, England
- Batting: Right-handed
- Bowling: Right-arm medium
- Relatives: Christopher Prowting (brother)

Domestic team information
- Years: Team
- 2006–2008: Durham UCCE

Career statistics
Competition	First-class
Matches	9
Runs scored	314
Batting average	19.62
100s/50s	–/1
Top score	78
Balls bowled	24
Wickets	–
Bowling average	–
5 wickets in innings	–
10 wickets in match	–
Best bowling	–
Catches/stumpings	3/–
- Source: Cricinfo, 19 August 2011

Nicholas Roger Prowting (born 26 October 1985) is an English cricketer. Prowting is a right-handed batsman who bowls right-arm medium pace. He was born in Chelmsford, Essex.

While studying for his degree at Durham University, Prowting made his first-class debut for Durham UCCE against Surrey in 2006. He made eight further first-class appearances for the university, the last of which came against Lancashire in 2008. In his nine first-class matches, he scored 314 runs at an average of 19.62, with a high score of 78. This score, his only first-class fifty, came against Nottinghamshire in 2007.

His brother, Christopher, played first-class cricket for the Marylebone Cricket Club in 2007.
