= Will Jenkins =

English cricketer (born 1994)

Personal information
- Full name: William Henry Jenkins
- Born: 4 July 1994 (age 32); Yeovil, Somerset, England
- Batting: Right-handed
- Bowling: Right-arm medium

Domestic team information
- Years: Team
- 2014–2016: Durham MCCU

Career statistics
Competition	First-class
Matches	5
Runs scored	52
Batting average	6.50
100s/50s	–/–
Top score	19
Balls bowled	444
Wickets	5
Bowling average	81.40
5 wickets in innings	–
10 wickets in match	–
Best bowling	2/27
Catches/stumpings	2/–
- Source: Cricinfo, 9 August 2020

William 'Will' Henry Jenkins (born 4 July 1994) is an English former first-class cricketer.

Jenkins was born at Yeovil in July 1994. He was educated at Millfield, before going up to Durham University. While studying at Durham, he played first-class cricket for Durham MCCU, making five appearances from 2014 to 2016. He scored a total of 52 runs in his five matches, with a high score of 19, while with the ball he took 5 wickets with his right-arm medium pace bowling, at an average of 81.40 and with best figures of 2 for 27.
