= Ajay Sangha =

English cricketer

Personal information
- Full name: Ajay Singh Sangha
- Born: 6 June 1992 (age 34); Windsor, Berkshire, England
- Batting: Right-handed
- Bowling: Right-arm off break

Domestic team information
- Years: Team
- 2012: Durham MCCU

Career statistics
Competition	First-class
Matches	2
Runs scored	63
Batting average	15.75
100s/50s	–/–
Top score	32
Balls bowled	210
Wickets	3
Bowling average	54.00
5 wickets in innings	–
10 wickets in match	–
Best bowling	1/36
Catches/stumpings	–/–
- Source: Cricinfo, 10 August 2020

Ajay Singh Sangha (born 6 June 1992) is an English former first-class cricketer.

Sangha was born at Windsor in June 1992. He was educated at Eton College, before going up to Durham University. While studying at Durham, he played two first-class cricket matches for Durham MCCU against Middlesex and Durham in 2012. He scored 63 runs in his two matches, with a high score of 32. With his off break bowling he took 3 wickets, with best figures of 1 for 36.
