= Lucas Carlisle =

English cricketer

Personal information
- Full name: Lucas Jonathon Carlisle
- Born: 1 June 1988 (age 38); Nottingham, Nottinghamshire, England
- Height: 6 ft 0 in (1.83 m)
- Batting: Left-handed
- Bowling: Right-arm off break

Domestic team information
- Years: Team
- 2008: Durham UCCE

Career statistics
Competition	First-class
Matches	2
Runs scored	28
Batting average	14.00
100s/50s	–/–
Top score	18*
Balls bowled	–
Wickets	–
Bowling average	–
5 wickets in innings	–
10 wickets in match	–
Best bowling	–
Catches/stumpings	1/–
- Source: Cricinfo, 19 August 2011

Lucas Jonathon Carlisle (born 1 June 1988) is an English cricketer. Carlisle is a left-handed batsman who bowls right-arm off break. He was born in Nottingham, Nottinghamshire and was educated at Worksop College.

While studying for his degree at Durham University, Carlisle made his first-class debut for Durham UCCE against Derbyshire in 2008. He made a further first-class appearances for the university in 2008, against Durham. In his two first-class matches, he scored 28 runs at an average of 14.00, with a high score of 18 not out.
