= James Wood (South African cricketer) =

South African cricketer

Personal information
- Full name: James Robert Wood
- Born: 8 September 1985 (age 41); Cape Town, Cape Province, South Africa
- Batting: Right-handed
- Role: Wicket-keeper

Domestic team information
- Years: Team
- 2005–2007: Durham UCCE

Career statistics
Competition	First-class
Matches	6
Runs scored	170
Batting average	15.45
100s/50s	–/–
Top score	31
Balls bowled	–
Wickets	–
Bowling average	–
5 wickets in innings	–
10 wickets in match	–
Best bowling	–
Catches/stumpings	2/1
- Source: Cricinfo, 20 August 2011

James Robert Wood (born 8 September 1985) is a South African cricketer. Wood is a right-handed batsman who fields as a wicket-keeper. He was born in Cape Town, Cape Province.

While studying for his degree at Durham University, Wood made his first-class debut for Durham UCCE against Durham in 2005. He made five further first-class appearances for the university, the last of which came against Lancashire in 2007. In his six first-class matches, he scored 170 runs at an average of 15.45, with a high score of 31. Behind the stumps he took 2 catches and made a single stumping.
