= Simon Hawk =

English cricketer (born 1979)

Personal information
- Full name: Simon Laurence John McLeod Hawk
- Born: 22 September 1979 (age 47); Paddington, London, England
- Batting: Right-handed
- Bowling: Right-arm medium

Domestic team information
- Years: Team
- 2003: Durham UCCE

Career statistics
Competition	First-class
Matches	2
Runs scored	81
Batting average	20.25
100s/50s	–/1
Top score	59
Balls bowled	–
Wickets	–
Bowling average	–
5 wickets in innings	–
10 wickets in match	–
Best bowling	–
Catches/stumpings	–/–
- Source: Cricinfo, 21 August 2011

Simon Laurence John McLeod Hawk (born 22 September 1979) is an English cricketer. Hawk is a right-handed batsman who bowls right-arm medium pace. He was born in Paddington, London.

While studying for his degree at Durham University, Hawk made his first-class debut for Durham UCCE against Durham in 2003. He made a further first-class appearance in 2003, against Lancashire. In his two first-class matches, he scored 81 runs at an average of 20.25, with a high score of 59. This score came against Lancashire.

His great-uncle, Alan McCoy, played first-class cricket in New Zealand for Auckland in the early nineteen thirties.
