= James Sookias =

English cricketer (born 1999)

Personal information
- Full name: James Hovannes Sookias
- Born: 7 May 1999 (age 27); Solihull, Warwickshire, England
- Batting: Right-handed
- Bowling: Right-arm very slow
- Role: Wicket-keeper
- Relatives: Hannah Welch, Lauren Welch

Domestic team information
- Years: Team
- 2018: Staffordshire
- 2018-present: Durham MCCU

Career statistics
Competition	First-class
Matches	2
Runs scored	1
Batting average	0.5
100s/50s	–/–
Top score	–
Balls bowled	–
Wickets	–
Bowling average	–
5 wickets in innings	–
10 wickets in match	–
Best bowling	–
Catches/stumpings	6/–
- Source: Cricinfo, 29 September 2018

James Hovannes Sookias (born 7 May 1999) is an English first-class cricketer. Born at Solihull in May 1999, Sookias was educated at Repton School, before attending the University of Durham. While studying at Durham, Sookias made his debut in first-class cricket in April 2018 for Durham MCCU against Warwickshire at Edgbaston. Playing as a wicket-keeper, he took three catches in the match. He made his debut in minor counties cricket for Staffordshire in the 2018 Minor Counties Championship.

Sookias made his second appearance in first-class cricket in April 2019 against Durham CCC at the Emirates Riverside.
