= Chris Roper =

English cricketer

Personal information
- Full name: Christopher George William Roper
- Born: 20 May 1991 (age 35); Bristol, England
- Batting: Right-handed
- Bowling: Right-arm Fast medium

Domestic team information
- Years: Team
- 2010–2011: Durham MCCU

Career statistics
| Competition | First-class |
|---|---|
| Matches | 4 |
| Runs scored | 107 |
| Batting average | 21.75 |
| 100s/50s | –/– |
| Top score | 46 |
| Balls bowled | 496 |
| Wickets | 10 |
| Bowling average | 26.00 |
| 5 wickets in innings | – |
| 10 wickets in match | – |
| Best bowling | 3/110 |
| Catches/stumpings | 1/– |
- Source: Cricinfo, 19 August 2011

Christopher George William Roper (born 20 May 1991) is an English cricketer. Roper is a right-handed batsman who bowls right-arm fast medium pace. He was born in Bristol.

While studying for his degree at Durham University, Roper made his first-class debut for Durham MCCU against Nottinghamshire in 2010. He has made three further first-class appearances for the team, the last of which came against Warwickshire in 2011. In his four first-class matches, he has taken 6 wickets at an average of 26.00, with best figures of 5/110.
