= Charles Legget =

Scottish cricketer (born 1988)

Personal information
- Full name: Charles William Stuart Legget
- Born: 21 January 1988 (age 38); Edinburgh, Midlothian, Scotland
- Nickname: Legs, Chuck
- Height: 6 ft 2 in (1.88 m)
- Batting: Right-handed
- Bowling: Right-arm medium fast
- Role: Bowling all-rounder

Domestic team information
- Years: Team
- 2005-: Durham UCCE, Scotland A, Scotland U19, Carlton CC

Career statistics
Competition	First-class
Matches	1
Runs scored	4
Batting average	4.00
100s/50s	–/–
Top score	4
Balls bowled	60
Wickets	2
Bowling average	21.50
5 wickets in innings	–
10 wickets in match	–
Best bowling	2/43
Catches/stumpings	–/–
- Source: Cricinfo, 19 August 2011

Charles William Stuart Legget (born 21 January 1988) is a Scottish cricketer. Legget is a right-handed batsman who bowls right-arm medium fast pace. He was born in Edinburgh, Midlothian and educated at Merchiston Castle School.

While studying for his degree at Durham University, Legget made his first-class debut for Durham UCCE against Durham in 2008. In his only first-class appearance for the university, he was dismissed for 4 runs in the university's first-innings by Graham Onions, with the university being bowled out for 76. In Durham's only innings, he took the wickets of Phil Mustard and Mark Davies for the cost of 43 runs from 10 overs.

After University Legget joined forces with fellow Durham student, James Coe, to form a new cricket brand that is based in Edinburgh, Scotland. The brand, Legget & Coe, launched in July 2011 with one range of bat called "Legacy" and was highly rated with several cricketers in the UK. Through sponsoring the Carlton CC Summer Sixes and Edinburgh University Indoor Sixes the brand has become known throughout Scotland. During the summer of 2011, Legget & Coe introduced the "L&C 1 Stump Challenge" which can be seen on the website's videos. Legget & Coe is preparing for the much anticipated launch of a full range of soft leather gear in the "Legacy" range and will be introducing 2012's new range called "Prophecy".
