= Chris Purshouse =

English cricketer

Personal information
- Full name: Christopher John Purshouse
- Born: September 1992 (age 34); Rotherham, Yorkshire, England
- Batting: Right-handed
- Bowling: Right-arm medium

Domestic team information
- Years: Team
- 2014: Durham MCCU

Career statistics
Competition	First-class
Matches	2
Runs scored	19
Batting average	6.33
100s/50s	–/–
Top score	11
Catches/stumpings	–/–
- Source: Cricinfo, 9 August 2020

Christopher John Purshouse (born September 1992) is an English former first-class cricketer.

Purshouse was born at Rotherham in September 1992. He was educated at Worksop College, before going up to Durham University. While studying at Durham, he played two first-class cricket matches for Durham MCCU against Derbyshire and Durham in 2014. He struggled against first-class county opposition, scoring just 19 runs in his two matches.
