= Ivo Hobson =

English cricketer

Personal information
- Full name: Ivo Hamilton Hobson
- Born: 29 December 1990 (age 35); Lambeth, London, England
- Batting: Right-handed
- Bowling: Right-arm off break

Domestic team information
- Years: Team
- 2013: Durham MCCU

Career statistics
Competition	First-class
Matches	2
Runs scored	17
Batting average	4.25
100s/50s	–/–
Top score	13
Balls bowled	24
Wickets	0
Bowling average	–
5 wickets in innings	–
10 wickets in match	–
Best bowling	–
Catches/stumpings	2/–
- Source: Cricinfo, 9 August 2020

Ivo Hamilton Hobson (29 December 1990) is an English former first-class cricketer.

Hobson was born at Lambeth in 1991. He was educated at Eton College, before going up to Durham University. While studying at Durham, he played two first-class cricket matches for Durham MCCU against Durham and Nottinghamshire in 2013. He tried hard against first-class county opposition, scoring just 17 runs in four innings'.
