= Rory Cox =

English cricketer

Personal information
- Full name: Rory Denzil Cox
- Born: 1991 (age 34–35); Winchester, Hampshire, England
- Batting: Left-handed
- Bowling: Left-arm medium

Domestic team information
- Years: Team
- 2013: Durham MCCU

Career statistics
Competition	First-class
Matches	2
Runs scored	20
Batting average	10.00
100s/50s	–/–
Top score	15
Balls bowled	108
Wickets	3
Bowling average	23.66
5 wickets in innings	–
10 wickets in match	–
Best bowling	3/49
Catches/stumpings	–/–
- Source: Cricinfo, 8 August 2020

Rory Denzil Cox (born 1991 in England) is an English former first-class cricketer.

Cox was born at Winchester in 1991. He was educated at Eton College, before going up to Collingwood College, Durham. While studying at Durham, he played two first-class cricket matches for Durham MCCU against Durham and Nottinghamshire in 2013. He scored 20 runs in his two matches, in addition to taking 3 wickets with his left-arm medium pace bowling.
