= Benjamin Williams (disambiguation) =

Benjamin Williams (1751–1814) was an American politician, last Federalist governor of North Carolina.

Benjamin Williams may also refer to:

- Benjamin Franklin Williams (1819–1886), Methodist minister and Texas politician
- Benjamin Williams (Vermont politician) (1876–1957), American politician, lieutenant governor of Vermont, 1931–1933
- Benjamin Samuel Williams (1822–1890), English orchidologist and nurseryman
- Benjamin Thomas Williams (1832–1890), British Member of Parliament for Carmarthen, 1878–1882
- Benjamin Williams (triple jumper) (born 1992), British triple jumper
- Benny Williams (musician) (1931–2007), American bluegrass musician

== See also ==
- Ben Williams (disambiguation)
- Benny Williams (disambiguation)
