= Christopher Paget =

English cricketer

Christopher Paget (born 2 November 1987) is an English cricketer. Born in Stafford, he is a right-handed batsman and a right-arm off break bowler who has played for Derbyshire since 2004.

At the time of his debut, he was the youngest ever player to line up for the Derbyshire team in the Championship, at 16 years and 282 days. Paget quickly proved to be an off-spinner remarkably adept at achieving the scalps of right-handers, such as those of the West Indian touring team of 2004. In his debut season, he played four matches, taking three wickets at an average of 68.66.

In his County Championship debut, in the same year, he was to prove expensive in a draw at Headingley against Derbyshire. He appeared in two more matches in the same month of August 2004, and has since lined up for the team in the Second XI Championship. In 2007, Paget represented Durham UCCE.

In 2013, Chris Paget was given a suspected diagnosis of multiple sclerosis (MS). By 2017, he received a formal diagnosis of MS. After receiving his diagnoses, Chris later started the mental health charity Milestone. Milestone was created with the mission to normalise vulnerabilities and support individual's mental health.
