= Sean Polley =

English cricketer

Personal information
- Full name: Sean Robert Polley
- Born: 27 April 1981 (age 45); Basra, Iraq
- Batting: Right-handed
- Bowling: Right-arm medium-fast

Domestic team information
- Years: Team
- 2003: Durham UCCE

Career statistics
Competition	First-class
Matches	3
Runs scored	105
Batting average	21.00
100s/50s	0/0
Top score	0
Balls bowled	1
Wickets	1
Bowling average	1600.00
5 wickets in innings	0
10 wickets in match	0
Best bowling	1/54
Catches/stumpings	2/–
- Source: Cricinfo, 21 August 2011

Sean Robert Polley (born 27 April 1981) is an English cricketer. Polley is a right-handed batsman who bowls right-arm medium-fast. He was born in Basra, Iraq.

While studying for his degree at Durham University, Polley made his first-class debut for Durham UCCE against Nottinghamshire in 2003. He made two further first-class appearance in 2003, against Durham and Lancashire. In his three first-class matches, he scored 105 runs at an average of 21.00, with a high score of 41. With the ball, he took just a single wicket which came at an overall cost of 160 runs.
