= Christian Begg =

English cricketer

Personal information
- Full name: Christian George Begg
- Born: 19 May 1986 (age 40); Johannesburg, Transvaal Province, South Africa
- Batting: Left-handed
- Bowling: Left-arm slow-medium

Domestic team information
- Years: Team
- 2006: Durham UCCE

Career statistics
Competition	First-class
Matches	2
Runs scored	4
Batting average	1.33
100s/50s	–/–
Top score	2
Balls bowled	–
Wickets	–
Bowling average	–
5 wickets in innings	–
10 wickets in match	–
Best bowling	–
Catches/stumpings	2/–
- Source: Cricinfo, 20 August 2011

Christian George Begg (born 19 May 1986) is an English cricketer. Begg is a left-handed batsman who bowls left-arm slow-medium. He was born in Johannesburg, Transvaal Province, South Africa.

While studying for his degree at Durham University, Begg made his first-class debut for Durham UCCE against Surrey in 2006. He made a further first-class appearance in 2006, against Nottinghamshire. In his two first-class matches for the university, he failed to impress with the bat, scoring 4 runs at an average of 1.33, with a high score of 2.
