= Max Scarr =

English cricketer

Personal information
- Full name: Max James Liam Scarr
- Born: 8 September 1991 (age 35); Oxford, Oxfordshire, England
- Nickname: Scarry
- Height: 5 ft 8 in (1.73 m)
- Batting: Left-handed
- Bowling: Slow left-arm orthodox

Career statistics
Competition	First-class
Matches	2
Runs scored	31
Batting average	7.75
100s/50s	–/–
Top score	16
Balls bowled	84
Wickets	–
Bowling average	–
5 wickets in innings	–
10 wickets in match	–
Best bowling	–
Catches/stumpings	–/–
- Source: Cricinfo, 18 August 2011

Max James Liam Scarr (born 8 September 1991) is an English cricketer. Scarr is a left-handed batsman who bowls slow left-arm orthodox. He was born in Oxford, Oxfordshire and educated at Monmouth School in Wales.

While studying for his degree at Durham University, Scarr made his first-class debut for Durham MCCU against Durham in 2011. He played a further first-class match for the university in 2011, against. Max famously once bowled the record number of front foot no-balls (15) in a single innings for Durham MCCU against Nottingham MCCU. He never played for Durham again after that. In his two first-class appearances that season, Scarr scored 31 runs at an average of 7.75, with a high score of 16. With the ball, he bowled a total of 14 wicket-less overs.
