= Charlie Wallis (cricketer) =

English cricketer

Personal information
- Full name: Charles Alexander Wallis
- Born: 14 October 1991 (age 35); Westminster, London, England
- Batting: Right-handed
- Bowling: Right-arm medium

Domestic team information
- Years: Team
- 2012–2013: Durham MCCU

Career statistics
Competition	First-class
Matches	4
Runs scored	21
Batting average	4.20
100s/50s	–/–
Top score	10
Balls bowled	564
Wickets	5
Bowling average	101.20
5 wickets in innings	–
10 wickets in match	–
Best bowling	2/63
Catches/stumpings	2/–
- Source: Cricinfo, 11 August 2020

Charles Alexander Wallis (born 14 October 1991) is an English former first-class cricketer.

Wallis was born at Westminster in October 1991. He was educated at Radley College, before going up to Hatfield College, Durham. While studying at Durham, he made four appearances in first-class cricket for Durham MCCU, playing twice in 2012 against Middlesex and Durham and twice in 2013 against Durham and Nottinghamshire. Playing as a right-arm medium pace bowler, he took 5 wickets in his four matches at an expensive average of 101.20, with best figures of 2 for 63.
