= Richard Gilbert (cricketer) =

English cricketer

Personal information
- Full name: Richard George Gilbert
- Born: 29 June 1980 (age 46); Scarborough, Yorkshire, England
- Batting: Right-handed
- Bowling: Right-arm medium-fast

Domestic team information
- Years: Team
- 2009–2010: Oxfordshire
- 2001: Durham UCCE

Career statistics
Competition	First-class
Matches	1
Runs scored	0
Batting average	0.00
100s/50s	–/–
Top score	0
Balls bowled	108
Wickets	–
Bowling average	–
5 wickets in innings	–
10 wickets in match	–
Best bowling	–
Catches/stumpings	–/–
- Source: Cricinfo, 24 May 2011

Richard George Gilbert (born 19 June 1980) is an English cricketer. Gilbert is a right-handed batsman who bowls left-arm medium-fast. He was born in Scarborough, Yorkshire.

Gilbert played his only first-class match for Durham UCCE in 2001 against Durham. In this match, he was dismissed for a duck by Danny Law in his only batting innings. With the ball, he bowled 18 wicket-less overs.

Gilbert made his debut for Oxfordshire in the 2009 MCCA Knockout Trophy against Bedfordshire. Gilbert played Minor counties cricket for Oxfordshire from 2009 to 2010, which included 2 Minor Counties Championship matches and 9 MCCA Knockout Trophy matches.
