= Dan Gale =

English cricketer (born 1989)

Personal information
- Full name: Daniel James Gale
- Born: 15 June 1989 (age 37); Tadworth, Surrey, England
- Height: 6 ft 1 in (1.85 m)
- Batting: Right-handed
- Bowling: Slow left-arm orthodox

Domestic team information
- Years: Team
- 2010: Durham MCCU
- 2008: Marylebone Cricket Club
- 2008–2009: Durham UCCE

Career statistics
Competition	First-class	List A
Matches	7	1
Runs scored	59	1
Batting average	29.50	–
100s/50s	–/–	–/–
Top score	37	1*
Balls bowled	725	54
Wickets	9	–
Bowling average	48.33	–
5 wickets in innings	–	–
10 wickets in match	–	–
Best bowling	4/94	–
Catches/stumpings	4/–	–/–
- Source: Cricinfo, 19 August 2011

Daniel James Gale (born 15 June 1989) is an English cricketer. Gale is a right-handed batsman who bowls slow left-arm orthodox. He was born in Tadworth, Surrey and educated at Glyn School in Epsom.

While studying for his degree at Durham University, Gale made his first-class debut for Durham UCCE against Derbyshire in 2008. He appeared in six further first-class matches for the university, the last of which against in 2010 against Durham, by which time the university was playing as Durham MCCU following a change of name in 2010. In his five first-class matches, he scored 59 runs at an average of 48.33, with a high score of 37. With the ball, he took 9 wickets at a bowling average of 48.33, with best figures of 4/94.

In 2008, he made a single List A appearance for the Marylebone Cricket Club against Bangladesh A. In this match, he scored an unbeaten single with the bat, while with the ball he bowled 9 wicket-less overs for the cost of 58 runs.

Gale graduated from Durham in 2010 with a Bachelor of Arts degree in Sport.
