= Freddie van den Bergh =

English cricketer

Personal information
- Full name: Frederick Oliver Edward van den Bergh
- Born: 14 June 1992 (age 34); Bickley, London, England
- Height: 6 ft 0 in (1.83 m)
- Batting: Right-handed
- Bowling: Slow left-arm orthodox

Domestic team information
- Years: Team
- 2011–2019: Surrey (squad no. 5)
- 2012–2014: Durham MCCU
- FC debut: 11 May 2011 Surrey v Cambridge MCCU
- LA debut: 27 July 2014 Surrey v Glamorgan

Career statistics
Competition	FC	LA	T20
Matches	9	5	4
Runs scored	78	51	27
Batting average	7.80	25.50	13.50
100s/50s	0/0	0/0	0/0
Top score	34	29*	19*
Balls bowled	1,589	216	36
Wickets	19	0	0
Bowling average	47.15	–	–
5 wickets in innings	0	–	–
10 wickets in match	0	–	–
Best bowling	4/84	–	–
Catches/stumpings	1/–	0/–	1/–
- Source: CricketArchive, 14 June 2019

Frederick Oliver Edward van den Bergh (born 14 June 1992) is an English cricketer. Van Den Bergh is a right-handed batsman who bowls slow left-arm orthodox. He was born in Bickley, London and educated at Whitgift School and Durham University.

Van den Bergh made his first-class debut for Surrey against Cambridge MCCU in 2011. In this match, he took three wickets in Cambridge MCCU's first-innings for the cost of 79 runs from 24 overs. In Surrey's second-innings, he was dismissed by Josh Poysden for a duck. He made his Twenty20 debut for Surrey in the 2018 t20 Blast on 6 July 2018.
