= Martin Souter =

English cricketer

Personal information
- Full name: Martin Andrew Souter
- Born: 19 February 1976 (age 50); Guildford, Surrey, England
- Batting: Right-handed
- Bowling: Right-arm medium

Domestic team information
- Years: Team
- 2002: Durham UCCE

Career statistics
| Competition | First-class |
|---|---|
| Matches | 1 |
| Runs scored | 1 |
| Batting average | 1.00 |
| 100s/50s | –/– |
| Top score | 1 |
| Balls bowled | 120 |
| Wickets | 1 |
| Bowling average | 83.00 |
| 5 wickets in innings | – |
| 10 wickets in match | – |
| Best bowling | 1/54 |
| Catches/stumpings | 1/– |
- Source: Cricinfo, 21 August 2011

Martin Andrew Souter (born 19 February 1976) is an English cricketer. Souter is a right-handed batsman who bowls right-arm medium pace. He was born in Guildford, Surrey.

Souter was schooled at Charterhouse and Durham University. While studying for his degree, Souter made his only first-class appearance for Durham UCCE against Durham in 2002. In this match, he was dismissed for a single run in the university's first-innings by Steve Harmison, while with the ball he took the wicket of Gary Pratt in Durham's first-innings for the cost of 54 runs from 12 overs, while in their second-innings he bowled 8 wicket-less overs for the cost of 29 runs.
