= Jonathan Dewes =

English cricketer

Personal information
- Full name: Jonathan James Northam Dewes
- Born: 19 August 1995 (age 31); Frimley, Surrey, England
- Batting: Right-handed
- Bowling: Slow left-arm orthodox
- Relatives: Jim Dewes (father); John Dewes (grandfather); Adam Dewes (brother)

Domestic team information
- Years: Team
- 2013: Dorset
- 2016: Durham MCCU

Career statistics
Competition	First-class
Matches	3
Runs scored	7
Batting average	–
100s/50s	0/0
Top score	4*
Balls bowled	372
Wickets	4
Bowling average	55.00
5 wickets in innings	0
10 wickets in match	0
Best bowling	2/93
Catches/stumpings	0/–
- Source: Cricinfo, 5 October 2018

Jonathan James Northam Dewes (born 19 August 1995) is an English first-class cricketer.

The son of the first-class cricketer Jim Dewes, and the grandson of the Test cricketer John Dewes, he was born at Frimley in August 1995. Dewes played minor counties cricket for Dorset in 2013, making one appearance in the Minor Counties Championship against Wales Minor Counties at Bournemouth. He later studied at Durham University, where he played two first-class matches for Durham MCCU in 2016, against Gloucestershire at Bristol, and Durham at Chester-le-Street.
