= Jim Dewes =

English cricketer

Personal information
- Full name: Anthony Roy Dewes
- Born: 2 June 1957 (age 69); Rugby, Warwickshire, England
- Batting: Right-handed
- Bowling: Leg break
- Relatives: John Dewes (father); Jonathan Dewes (son); Adam Dewes (son)

Domestic team information
- Years: Team
- 1978–1979: Cambridge University

Career statistics
Competition	First-class	List A
Matches	14	1
Runs scored	368	0
Batting average	18.40	0.00
100s/50s	0/2	0/0
Top score	84	0
Balls bowled	198	–
Wickets	1	–
Bowling average	146.00	–
5 wickets in innings	0	–
10 wickets in match	0	–
Best bowling	1/52	–
Catches/stumpings	3/–	0/–
- Source: Cricinfo, 4 September 2019

Anthony Roy "Jim" Dewes (born 2 June 1957) is an English former cricketer.

The son of the Test cricketer John Dewes, who played for England between 1948–50, Dewes was born in June 1957 at Rugby, Warwickshire. He was educated at Dulwich College, where his father taught, before going up to St John's College, Cambridge. While studying at Cambridge, he made his debut in first-class cricket for Cambridge University against Surrey at Fenner's in 1978. He played first-class cricket for Cambridge until 1979, making fourteen appearances. In his fourteen matches, he scored a total of 368 runs at an average of 18.40 and a high score of 84. In addition to playing first-class cricket while at Cambridge, he also made a single List A one-day appearance for the Combined Universities cricket team against Northamptonshire in the 1979 Benson & Hedges Cup, during which he was dismissed without scoring by Tim Lamb. After graduating from Cambridge, he became a schoolteacher. He currently teaches geography at Wellington College, Berkshire. His sons, Jonathan and Adam Dewes, have also played first-class cricket.
