= Simon Hollingsworth (cricketer) =

English cricketer (born 1983)

Personal information
- Full name: Simon Christopher Hollingsworth
- Born: 1 October 1983 (age 43); Chertsey, Surrey, England
- Batting: Right-handed
- Bowling: Right-arm medium

Domestic team information
- Years: Team
- 2004: Durham UCCE

Career statistics
Competition	First-class
Matches	3
Runs scored	65
Batting average	13.00
100s/50s	0/0
Top score	30
Catches/stumpings	2/0
- Source: Cricinfo, 21 August 2011

Simon Christopher Hollingsworth (born 1 October 1983) is an English cricketer. Hollingsworth is a right-handed batsman who bowls right-arm medium pace. He was born in Chertsey, Surrey.

While studying for his degree at Durham University, Hollingsworth made his first-class debut for Durham UCCE against Durham in 2004. He made two further first-class appearance in 2004, against Derbyshire. In his two first-class matches, he scored 65 runs at an average of 13.00, with a high score of 30.
