= Alex Loudon =

English cricketer

- Loudon at Lord's Cricket Ground

Personal information
- Full name: Alexander Guy Rushworth Loudon
- Born: 6 September 1980 (age 46); Westminster, London, England
- Height: 6 ft 3 in (1.91 m)
- Batting: Right-handed
- Bowling: Right arm off break
- Relatives: Hugo Loudon (brother)

International information
- National side: England
- Only ODI (cap 195): 24 June 2006 v Sri Lanka

Domestic team information
- Years: Team
- 2001–2003: Durham UCCE
- 2003–2004: Kent
- 2005–2007: Warwickshire

Career statistics
Competition	ODI	FC	LA	T20
Matches	1	76	77	25
Runs scored	0	3,594	1,312	222
Batting average	0.00	31.25	23.42	10.57
100s/50s	0/0	5/20	0/8	0/0
Top score	0	172	73*	27
Balls bowled	36	8,381	2,199	270
Wickets	0	116	44	20
Bowling average	–	39.75	40.43	16.35
5 wickets in innings	–	7	0	1
10 wickets in match	–	0	0	0
Best bowling	–	6/47	4/48	5/33
Catches/stumpings	0/–	52/–	29/–	12/–
- Source: CricInfo, 15 February 2010

Alexander Guy Rushworth Loudon (born 6 September 1980) is an English former professional cricketer. A right-handed batsman and off spin bowler, he was considered a promising future international player.

== Early life ==
Raised in the family home at Olantigh near Wye, Kent, Loudon was educated at Wellesley House School and Eton College, where he was President of the Eton Society. There he captained the 1st XI, and subsequently the Durham University 1st XI while studying at Collingwood College, and captained both the England Under-15 and England Under-19 teams. He was awarded the NBC Denis Compton Award in 1999.

== Cricket career ==
He started his professional career at Kent before moving to Warwickshire in 2005. Initially known for his batting, in later years he worked hard to improve his bowling, gaining recognition as an all-rounder. An off spin bowler, he was reported to be working on the doosra, the much-discussed variation ball which turns the other way, although by his own admission his technique was still at an inconsistent stage.

Loudon was selected for the 17-man Test squad to tour Pakistan in autumn 2005, when England were looking for a second spinner in addition to Ashley Giles. However, he was not called upon to play.

He was subsequently called up as a part of the 15-man squad for the One Day Internationals versus Sri Lanka in June 2006, playing a solitary game. He took 0/36 off 6 overs and was run out without facing a ball. He was not selected for either the Test or One Day legs of England's tour to Australia the following winter.

== Retirement ==
On 19 October 2007, Loudon announced his retirement from cricket to pursue a business career. In 2008, Loudon enrolled in the full-time MBA programme at the London Business School. As of 2017, he was a partner in investment firm Abercross Holdings.

== Personal life ==
Loudon attracted significant media attention in 2011, when he was dating Pippa Middleton, although the duo subsequently broke up.
