= Alex Deuchar =

English cricketer

Personal information
- Full name: Alexander John Wilfred Deuchar
- Born: 10 December 1988 (age 37); Darlington, County Durham, England
- Height: 6 ft 2 in (1.88 m)
- Batting: Right-handed
- Bowling: Right-arm medium

Domestic team information
- Years: Team
- 2011: Durham MCCU

Career statistics
| Competition | First-class |
|---|---|
| Matches | 2 |
| Runs scored | 0 |
| Batting average | 0.00 |
| 100s/50s | –/– |
| Top score | 0* |
| Balls bowled | 264 |
| Wickets | 5 |
| Bowling average | 30.00 |
| 5 wickets in innings | – |
| 10 wickets in match | – |
| Best bowling | 4/50 |
| Catches/stumpings | 1/– |
- Source: Cricinfo, 19 August 2011

Alexander John Wilfred Deuchar (born 10 December 1988) is an English cricketer. Deuchar is a right-handed batsman who bowls right-arm medium pace. He was born in Darlington, County Durham.

Deuchar was educated at the British International School in Riyadh, Saudi Arabia, and at Carmel Roman Catholic School in Darlington. While studying for his degree at Durham University, Deuchar made his first-class debut for Durham MCCU against Durham in 2011. He made a further first-class appearance for the team in 2011, against Warwickshire. In these two first-class matches, he took five wickets at an average of 30.00, with best figures of 4/50.

Deuchar emigrated to Australia where he featured in the Victorian Sub-District Cricket Association, including four seasons as captain of Mount Waverley and a spell as coach of Taylors Lakes.
