= Luc Durandt =

South African born English cricketer

Personal information
- Full name: Luc Etienne Durandt
- Born: 1 September 1989 (age 37); Johannesburg, Transvaal Province, South Africa
- Batting: Left-handed
- Bowling: Right-arm medium

Domestic team information
- Years: Team
- 2010–2011: Durham MCCU
- 2009: Berkshire

Career statistics
Competition	First-class
Matches	5
Runs scored	280
Batting average	40.00
100s/50s	–/–
Top score	131
Balls bowled	179
Wickets	3
Bowling average	42.00
5 wickets in innings	–
10 wickets in match	–
Best bowling	3/65
Catches/stumpings	1/–
- Source: Cricinfo, 17 August 2011

Luc Etienne Durandt (born 1 September 1989) is a South African born English cricketer. Durandt is a left-handed batsman who bowls right-arm medium. He was born in Johannesburg, Transvaal Province and was educated at Wellington College.

Durandt made a single Minor Counties Championship appearance for Berkshire against Cheshire in 2009. Later, while studying for his degree in Sport at Collingwood College, Durham, Durandt made his first-class debut for Durham MCCU against Nottinghamshire in 2010. He has made four further first-class appearances for the team, the last of which came against Yorkshire in 2011. In his five first-class matches, he scored 280 runs at an average of 40.00, with a high score of 131. This score came against Warwickshire in 2011. With the ball, he took 3 wickets at a bowling average of 42.00, with best figures of 3/65.

Durandt has also played for a number of county Second XI's.
