= John Somerville-Hendrie =

English cricketer

Personal information
- Full name: John William Somerville-Hendrie
- Born: 22 June 1983 (age 43); Hillingdon, London, England
- Batting: Right-handed
- Bowling: Right-arm medium-fast

Domestic team information
- Years: Team
- 2003–2004: Durham UCCE

Career statistics
Competition	First-class
Matches	4
Runs scored	31
Batting average	10.33
100s/50s	–/–
Top score	23
Balls bowled	526
Wickets	8
Bowling average	44.75
5 wickets in innings	–
10 wickets in match	–
Best bowling	3/51
Catches/stumpings	–/–
- Source: Cricinfo, 21 August 2011

John William Somerville-Hendrie (born 22 June 1983) is an English cricketer. He is a right-handed batsman who bowls right-arm medium-fast. He was born in Hillingdon, London.

While studying for his degree at Durham University, Somerville-Hendrie made his first-class debut for Durham UCCE against Durham in 2003. He made three further first-class appearances for the university, the last of which came against Derbyshire in 2004. In his four first-class matches, he scored 31 runs at an average of 10.33, with a high score of 23. With the ball, he took 8 wickets at a bowling average of 44.75, with best figures of 3/51.
