= Alex Stead =

English cricketer

Personal information
- Full name: Roger Alexander Stead
- Born: 18 September 1980 (age 46); Dewsbury, Yorkshire, England
- Batting: Right-handed
- Bowling: Right-arm medium

Domestic team information
- Years: Team
- 2001: Durham UCCE
- 2007–2009: Cumberland
- 2010–2011: Staffordshire

Career statistics
Competition	First-class
Matches	2
Runs scored	28
Batting average	14.00
100s/50s	0/0
Top score	28
Balls bowled	210
Wickets	0
Bowling average	–
5 wickets in innings	–
10 wickets in match	–
Best bowling	–
Catches/stumpings	1/–
- Source: CricketArchive, 26 March 2011

Roger Alexander Stead (born 18 April 1980) is an English cricketer. Stead is a right-handed batsman who bowls right-arm medium pace. He was born in Dewsbury, Yorkshire.

Stead made his first-class debut for Durham UCCE against Durham in 2001. He played his second and final first-class match in the same season against Worcestershire. In his two first-class matches, he scored 28 runs at a batting average of 14.00, with a single high score of 28. With the ball he bowled 35 wicket-less overs.

Stead later joined Cumberland in 2007, making his Minor Counties Championship debut against Staffordshire. He played for Cumberland in seven Minor Counties Championship and 4 MCCA Knockout Trophy to 2009, before joining Staffordshire in 2010.

He has previously played Second XI cricket for the Yorkshire Second XI.
