= Matthew Creese =

English cricketer

Matthew Leonard Creese (born 13 February 1982) is an English former cricketer. Born in Enfield, Middlesex, he played for Middlesex County Cricket Club.

Creese represented the Second XI at Middlesex between 1997 and 2002, and was the youngest player in the club's history to debut for the second team at the time.

Despite being a promising left arm spinner and effective lower order batsman he only played in one first-class match for Middlesex against Cambridge UCCE in 1999 and one first-class match representing Durham UCCE against Lancashire County Cricket Club in 2002.

Creese also played for the MCC Young Cricketers for a number of years.

Creese played club cricket for Southgate Cricket Club competing in the Middlesex League until 2012. On Saturday 30 July 2011 against Harrow Town CC Creese took 9 wickets for 65 runs and then scored 111 not out to win the game, registering the best combined bowling and batting figures in league history.
