= Luke Blackaby =

English cricketer

Personal information
- Full name: Luke Alexander Blackaby
- Born: 1 February 1991 (age 35); Farnborough, Kent, England
- Nickname: Blackers
- Batting: Left-handed
- Bowling: Left-arm medium

Domestic team information
- Years: Team
- 2010–2011: Durham MCCU

Career statistics
Competition	First-class
Matches	5
Runs scored	116
Batting average	16.57
100s/50s	–/–
Top score	38
Balls bowled	204
Wickets	1
Bowling average	133.00
5 wickets in innings	–
10 wickets in match	–
Best bowling	1/41
Catches/stumpings	1/–
- Source: Cricinfo, 18 August 2011

Luke Alexander Blackaby (born 1 February 1991) is an English cricketer. Blackaby is a left-handed batsman who bowls left-arm medium pace. He was born in Farnborough, Kent and was educated at Wildernesse School.

While studying for his degree in sports at Durham University, Blackaby made his first-class debut for Durham MCCU against Durham in 2010. He made four further first-class appearances for the team, the last of which came against Yorkshire in 2011. In his five first-class matches, he scored 116 runs at an average of 16.57, with a high score of 38. With the ball, he took a single wicket which came at an overall cost of 133 runs.

A member of MCC, since 2017 Blackaby has worked for Shell Energy in London.

== See also ==
- Marylebone Cricket Club
