= Tim Alexander (cricketer) =

English cricketer

Personal information
- Full name: Timothy David Alexander
- Born: 1 December 1994 (age 31); Norwich, Norfolk, England
- Batting: Right-handed
- Bowling: Right-arm fast-medium

Domestic team information
- Years: Team
- 2014–2016: Durham MCCU

Career statistics
| Competition | First-class |
|---|---|
| Matches | 3 |
| Runs scored | 3 |
| Batting average | 3.00 |
| 100s/50s | –/– |
| Top score | 2 |
| Balls bowled | 269 |
| Wickets | 5 |
| Bowling average | 40.00 |
| 5 wickets in innings | – |
| 10 wickets in match | – |
| Best bowling | 4/80 |
| Catches/stumpings | –/– |
- Source: Cricinfo, 8 August 2020

Timothy David Alexander (born 1 December 1994) is an English former first-class cricketer.

Alexander was born at Norwich in December 1994. He was educated at Framlingham College, before going up to Durham University. While studying at Durham, he played three first-class cricket matches for Durham MCCU. He played twice against Derbyshire and Durham in 2014, but did not feature for the team in 2015, with his third appearance coming against Durham in 2016. Playing as a right-arm fast-medium bowler, he took 5 wickets at an average of 40.00 and best figures of 4 for 80.
