= Mark Phythian =

English cricketer

Personal information
- Full name: Mark John Phythian
- Born: 26 April 1985 (age 41); Peterborough, Cambridgeshire, England
- Nickname: Monty
- Height: 5 ft 9 in (1.75 m)
- Batting: Right-handed
- Role: Wicket-keeper

Domestic team information
- Years: Team
- 2005–2007: Durham UCCE

Career statistics
Competition	First-class
Matches	7
Runs scored	158
Batting average	22.57
100s/50s	–/1
Top score	62*
Balls bowled	–
Wickets	–
Bowling average	–
5 wickets in innings	–
10 wickets in match	–
Best bowling	–
Catches/stumpings	15/1
- Source: Cricinfo, 20 August 2011

Mark John Phythian (born 26 April 1985) is an English cricketer. Phythian is a right-handed batsman who fields as a wicket-keeper. He was born in Peterborough, Cambridgeshire and educated at Oundle School.

While studying for his degree at Durham University, Phythian made his first-class debut for Durham UCCE against Somerset in 2005. He made six further first-class appearances for the university, the last of which came against Lancashire in 2007. In his seven first-class matches, he scored 158 runs at an average of 22.57, with a high score of 62 not out. Behind the stumps he took 15 catches and made a single stumping. His highest score of 62, which was his only first-class fifty, came against Nottinghamshire in 2006.
