= Lewis Bedford (cricketer) =

English cricketer (born 1999)

Personal information
- Full name: Lewis Bedford
- Born: 10 March 1999 (age 27); Guildford, Surrey, England
- Batting: Right-handed

Domestic team information
- Years: Team
- 2019: Durham MCCU

Career statistics
Competition	First-class
Matches	2
Runs scored	2
Batting average	0.66
100s/50s	–/–
Top score	2
Catches/stumpings	1/–
- Source: Cricinfo, 8 August 2020

Lewis Bedford (born 10 March 1999) is an English former first-class cricketer.

Bedford was born at Guildford in March 1999. He was educated at Cranleigh School, where he played cricket for the school team and in June 2017 recorded the highest individual score playing for the school, making 172 against Royal Grammar School, Guildford. He surpassed the previous highest individual score of 150, which had stood since 1903. From Cranleigh he went up to Durham University, where he played two first-class cricket matches for Durham MCCU against Durham and Northamptonshire in 2019. Bedford struggled at first-class level against county opposition, scoring just 2 from three batting innings'.
