= Matthew Banes =

English cricketer

Personal information
- Full name: Matthew John Banes
- Born: 10 December 1979 (age 46); Pembury, Kent, England
- Batting: Right-handed
- Bowling: Right-arm medium

Domestic team information
- Years: Team
- 1999–2003: Kent
- 2001–2002: Durham University
- 2001–2003: Kent Cricket Board

Career statistics
Competition	First-class	List A
Matches	11	4
Runs scored	388	110
Batting average	22.82	27.50
100s/50s	0/3	0/1
Top score	69	82
Balls bowled	294	12
Wickets	3	1
Bowling average	58.33	11.00
5 wickets in innings	0	0
10 wickets in match	0	0
Best bowling	3/65	1/11
Catches/stumpings	4/–	2/–
- Source: CricInfo, 21 March 2017

Matthew John Banes (born 10 December 1979) is a former English professional cricketer. Banes played first-class cricket for Durham University and Kent County Cricket Club between 1999 and 2003. He batted right-handed and bowled right-arm medium pace.

== Life and career ==
Banes was born in Pembury in Kent and attended Tonbridge School where he set school records for the total number of runs and centuries scored, surpassing the records of Colin Cowdrey. He went up to Durham University studying Ancient History at Collingwood College.

Having made his Kent Second XI debut in 1998, Banes made his senior debut for the county in July 1999 against the touring New Zealanders at Canterbury, scoring a half century. He made his County Championship debut the following week against Nottinghamshire. He captained Durham University in its first two years of first-class cricket in 2001 and played in six first-class matches for the university in 2001 and 2002 as well as appearing in two first-class matches for the British Universities cricket team.

Banes made his List A cricket debut in September 2001 in the early rounds of the 2002 Cheltenham & Gloucester Trophy for Kent Cricket Board. He was released by Kent at the end of the 2002 season, although after a successful Sydney Grade Cricket season in 2002/03 playing for Randwick Petersham Cricket Club he earned a recall to the Kent team for the 2003 season.

After making his only Kent one-day appearance in the 2003 ECB National League and playing for Kent Cricket Board in the 2003 Cheltenham & Gloucester Trophy, Banes played his final match for the county against the touring South Africans in August 2003 at Canterbury. He left Kent at the end of the 2003 season and became a school teacher, teaching at Eastbourne College where he was master-in-charge of cricket.
