= Will Dobson (cricketer) =

English cricketer

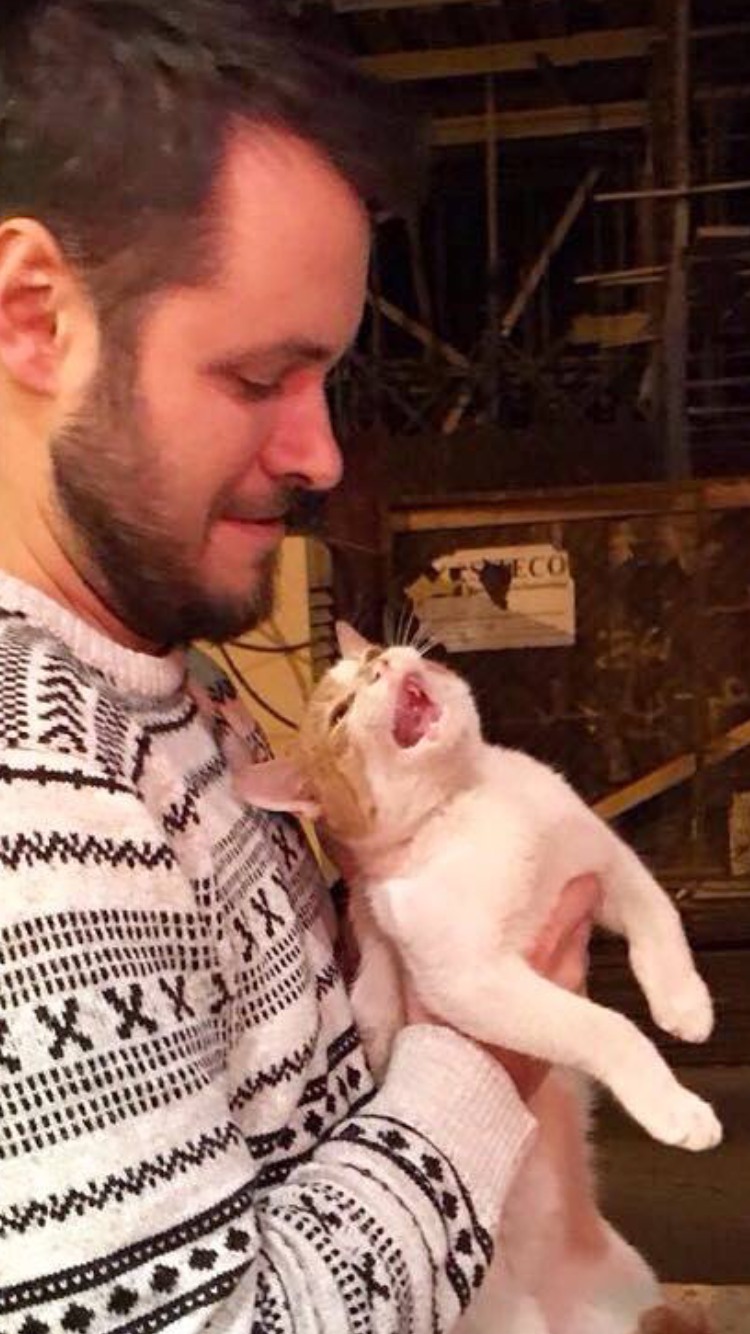

Personal information
- Full name: William Thomas Dobson
- Born: 11 March 1986 (age 40); Oxford, Oxfordshire, England
- Batting: Right-handed
- Bowling: Right-arm off-spin

Domestic team information
- Years: Team
- 2006–2007: Durham UCCE

Career statistics
| Competition | First-class |
|---|---|
| Matches | 3 |
| Runs scored | 29 |
| Batting average | 14.50 |
| 100s/50s | 0/0 |
| Top score | 13* |
| Balls bowled | 210 |
| Wickets | 1 |
| Bowling average | 144.00 |
| 5 wickets in innings | 0 |
| 10 wickets in match | 0 |
| Best bowling | 1/67 |
| Catches/stumpings | 1/– |
- Source: Cricinfo, 20 August 2011

William Thomas Dobson (born 11 March 1986) is an English cricketer. Dobson is a right-handed batsman who bowls right-arm off-spin. He was born in Oxford, Oxfordshire and was educated at Eton College.

While studying for his degree at Durham University, Dobson made his first-class debut for Durham UCCE against Nottinghamshire in 2006. He made two further first-class appearances for the university, one in 2007 against Lancashire, while the other came against Durham in 2007. In his three first-class matches, he scored 29 runs at an average of 14.50, with a high score of 13 not out. With the ball, he took just a single wicket which came at an overall cost of 144 runs.
