= Omar Anwar =

English cricketer

Personal information
- Full name: Omar Anwar
- Born: 1 July 1983 (age 43); Harrow, Middlesex, England
- Batting: Right handed
- Bowling: Unknown

Domestic team information
- Years: Team
- 2003–2006: Oxford UCCE
- First-class debut: 12 April 2003 Oxford UCCE v Middlesex
- Last First-class: 31 May 2006 Oxford UCCE v Durham

Career statistics
| Competition | First-class |
|---|---|
| Matches | 13 |
| Runs scored | 402 |
| Batting average | 23.64 |
| 100s/50s | -/2 |
| Top score | 99 |
| Balls bowled | 3 |
| Wickets | 0 |
| Bowling average | – |
| 5 wickets in innings | – |
| 10 wickets in match | – |
| Best bowling | – |
| Catches/stumpings | 2/– |
- Source: CricketArchive, 11 October 2008

Omar Anwar (born 1 July 1983) is a former English cricketer who played for Oxford UCCE. He was born in Harrow.

He made his first appearance for the team against Middesex in 2003, scoring 99 in his first innings, which would remain his first-class best for the entirety of his career. He made two further first-class appearances during 2003, and two appearances for Middlesex Second XI at the end of the University year.

Anwar continued to appear for Oxford University until 2006, playing for Stanmore in the Cockspur Cup for the first time in 2005.
