= Mark Dale =

English cricketer

Personal information
- Full name: Mark Adam Paul Dale
- Born: 16 March 1982 (age 44); Nottingham, Nottinghamshire, England
- Batting: Right-handed

Domestic team information
- Years: Team
- 2006-present: Northumberland
- 2004-2005: Herefordshire
- 2003-2005: Durham UCCE
- 2001-2002: Worcestershire Cricket Board

Career statistics
Competition	FC	LA
Matches	6	2
Runs scored	241	0
Batting average	26.77	0.00
100s/50s	–/–	–/–
Top score	48	0
Balls bowled	72	–
Wickets	1	–
Bowling average	66.00	–
5 wickets in innings	–	–
10 wickets in match	–	–
Best bowling	1/34	–
Catches/stumpings	–/–	–/–
- Source: Cricinfo, 1 November 2010

Mark Adam Paul Dale (born 16 March 1982) is an English cricketer. Dale is a right-handed batsman. He was born at Nottingham, Nottinghamshire.

Dale represented the Worcestershire Cricket Board in two List A matches against Buckinghamshire in the 1st round of the 2002 Cheltenham & Gloucester Trophy which was played in 2001 and the Sussex Cricket Board 2nd round of the 2003 Cheltenham & Gloucester Trophy which was played in 2002.

In 2003, Dale made his debut in first-class cricket for Durham University CCCE against Nottinghamshire. From 2003 to 2005, he represented the university in six first-class matches, the last of which came against Leicestershire. In his six first-class matches, he scored 241 runs at a batting average of 26.77, with a high score of 48. With the ball he took a single wicket at a bowling average of 66.00, with best figures of 1/34.

Dale joined Herefordshire in 2004, making his debut for the county in the Minor Counties Championship against Dorset. From 2004 to 2005, he represented the county in five Minor Counties Championship matches, the last of which came against Berkshire. In 2006, Dale joined Northumberland, making his debut for the county in the Minor Counties Championship against Lincolnshire. From 2006 to present, he has played 18 Championship matches for the county. Dale has also represented the county in 9 MCCA Knockout Trophy matches to date.
