= Will Burnell =

English cricketer

Personal information
- Full name: William Fleet Burnell
- Born: 7 January 1984 (age 42); Havering, Greater London, England
- Batting: Right-handed
- Bowling: Right-arm medium

Domestic team information
- Years: Team
- 2004–2005: Durham UCCE

Career statistics
| Competition | First-class |
|---|---|
| Matches | 4 |
| Runs scored | 64 |
| Batting average | 10.66 |
| 100s/50s | –/– |
| Top score | 49 |
| Balls bowled | 24 |
| Wickets | – |
| Bowling average | – |
| 5 wickets in innings | – |
| 10 wickets in match | – |
| Best bowling | – |
| Catches/stumpings | –/– |
- Source: Cricinfo, 21 August 2011

William Fleet Burnell (born 7 January 1984) is an English cricketer. Burnell is a right-handed batsman who bowls right-arm medium pace. He was born in Havering, Greater London.

While studying for his degree at Durham University, Burnell made his first-class debut for Durham UCCE against Durham in 2004. He made three further first-class appearances for the university, the last of which came against Leicestershire in 2005. In his four first-class matches, he scored 64 runs at an average of 10.66, with a high score of 49.
