= James Lawrence (cricketer, born 1976) =

English cricketer (born 1976)

James Richard Geoffrey Lawrence (born 29 November 1976 in Portsmouth) is a former English cricketer. He was a right-handed tail-end batsman and a left-arm medium-fast bowler who played first-class cricket for Durham in 1995 and British Universities in 1998.

James Lawrence represented Durham in one match during the 1995 County Championship. From 1997 to 1999 he played in three consecutive finals in the Halifax British Universities Sports Association Championship, two of which were won by his Durham University team. He also played two matches in the Benson & Hedges Cup competition in 1998, before making his second and final first-class appearance, for British Universities against the New Zealanders.
