= Michael Davies (cricketer) =

English cricketer

Michael Davies (born 17 July 1976) was an English cricketer. He was a right-handed batsman and a left-arm slow bowler.

Having spent three years prior to the beginning of his first-class career in Second XI cricket, playing for Leicestershire, Northamptonshire and Essex. Moving to First Class cricket, he played for Northamptonshire and the full Essex team in a four-year-long career. He then played for Essex CB in the Minor Counties Trophy of 2001 and played in the Essex Second XI before retiring.
