= William Kirby (cricketer) =

English cricketer

Personal information
- Full name: William Anthony Kirby
- Born: 2 June 1981 (age 45); Hull, Yorkshire, England
- Batting: Right-handed
- Bowling: Right-arm medium

Domestic team information
- Years: Team
- 2009-present: Lincolnshire
- 2002: Durham UCCE
- 2000: Nottinghamshire Cricket Board

Career statistics
Competition	FC	LA
Matches	2	1
Runs scored	78	3
Batting average	26.00	3.00
100s/50s	–/–	–/–
Top score	37	3
Balls bowled	–	–
Wickets	–	–
Bowling average	–	–
5 wickets in innings	–	–
10 wickets in match	–	–
Best bowling	–	–
Catches/stumpings	2/–	–/–
- Source: Cricinfo, 23 November 2010

William Anthony Kirby (born 2 June 1981) is an English cricketer. Kirby is a right-handed batsman who bowls right-arm medium pace. He was born in Hull, Yorkshire.

Kirby represented the Nottinghamshire Cricket Board in a single List A match against the Gloucestershire Cricket Board in the 1st round of the 2000 NatWest Trophy. In his only List A match, he scored 3 runs.

In 2002, he played 2 first-class matches for Durham UCCE against Durham and Nottinghamshire. In those 2 matches, he scored 78 runs at a batting average of 26.00, with a high score of 37, while in the field he took 2 catches.

In 2009, he joined Lincolnshire, making his debut for the county in the Minor Counties Championship against Norfolk. From 2009 to present, he has represented the county in 7 Championship matches. Is debut for Lincolnshire in the MCCA Knockout Trophy came against Norfolk in 2009, and to present he has played 2 further Trophy matches for the county.
