= Mark Thorburn =

English cricketer and cricket coach

Personal information
- Full name: Mark Thorburn
- Born: 11 August 1978 (age 48); Bath, Somerset, England
- Batting: Right-handed
- Bowling: Right-arm medium-fast

Domestic team information
- Years: Team
- 2001–2002: Durham UCCE
- 2003: Hampshire

Career statistics
Competition	First-class
Matches	6
Runs scored	35
Batting average	8.75
100s/50s	–/–
Top score	12
Balls bowled	708
Wickets	12
Bowling average	43.58
5 wickets in innings	–
10 wickets in match	–
Best bowling	2/53
Catches/stumpings	1/–
- Source: Cricinfo, 7 December 2009

Mark Thorburn (born 1 August 1978) is an English cricket coach and former first-class cricketer.

Thorburn was born in August 1978 at Bath, Somerset. He was educated at Beechen Cliff School, before matriculating to Durham University. There, he played first-class cricket for Durham UCCE, making his debut against Lancashire at Durham. He played first-class cricket for Durham UCCE until 2002, making five appearances. He trialled for Hampshire in 2003, making a single first-class appearance for the county against Oxford UCCE at Oxford. In six first-class appearances, Thorburn took 12 wickets with his right-arm medium-fast bowling at an average of 43.58 and took best figures of 2 for 53.

After his first-class career, Thorburn moved into a coaching role at Gloucestershire. He was initially a performance analyst, before being appointed bowling coach in 2014. In 2022, he became one of the highest qualified coaches in county cricket when he completed his master's degree in sport, strength and conditioning from the University of Gloucestershire. In October 2022, he replaced Tim Hancock as Gloucestershire's head of talent pathway on an interim basis, prior to the appointment of Paul Muchall in the role in March 2023.
