= SS William A. Dobson =

Two Liberty ships were named William A. Dobson. Both were launched in 1944 so they are disambiguated by month of launch.

- SS William A. Dobson (September 1944)
- SS William A. Dobson (November 1944)
