= Benny Williams (footballer) =

English former professional footballer who played as a Winger

Personal information
- Date of birth: 14 April 1951 (age 75)
- Place of birth: Lincoln, England
- Height: 5 ft 8 in (1.73 m)
- Position: Winger

Senior career*
Years	Team	Apps	(Gls)
1968–1969	Lincoln United		
1969–1970	Grimsby Town	2	(0)
1970–1971	Lincoln United		
1971–1972	Brigg Town		
1972–197?	Gainsborough Trinity		
- * Club domestic league appearances and goals

Benny Williams (born 14 April 1951) is an English former professional footballer who played as a winger.
