= Charles Pimlott =

English cricketer and barrister

Personal information
- Full name: Charles Robert Pimlott
- Born: 25 September 1979 (age 47); Stockport, Cheshire, England
- Batting: Right-handed
- Bowling: Right-arm fast-medium

Domestic team information
- Years: Team
- 1999–2000: Cambridge University
- 2000: British Universities
- 2001: Lincolnshire

Career statistics
Competition	First-class
Matches	11
Runs scored	72
Batting average	24.00
100s/50s	–/–
Top score	31*
Balls bowled	1,130
Wickets	17
Bowling average	34.47
5 wickets in innings	–
10 wickets in match	–
Best bowling	3/10
Catches/stumpings	3/–
- Source: Cricinfo, 16 February 2019

Charles Robert Pimlott (born 25 February 1979) is an English barrister and a former first-class cricketer.

Pimlott was born at Stockport and was educated at Stockport Grammar School, before going up to Downing College, Cambridge to study law. While at Cambridge he made his debut in first-class cricket for Cambridge University against Lancashire at Fenner's in 1999. He made six first-class appearances for Cambridge in 1999, alongside four in 2000. He also played in one first-class match for the British Universities cricket team in 2000, against the touring Zimbabweans. Across his eleven appearances at first-class level, Pimlott scored 72 runs with a high score of 31 not out, alongside 17 wickets with his right-arm fast-medium bowling, taken at an average of 34.47, with best figures of 3 for 10. He played briefly for Lincolnshire in minor counties cricket, making one appearance against the Nottinghamshire Cricket Board in the 2001 MCCA Knockout Trophy.

After graduating from Cambridge, Pimlott was called to the bar in 2001 as a member of the Middle Temple. He currently practices as a barrister specialising in construction and energy disputes, insurance, professional negligence, and commercial litigation.
