= Jack Wood (English cricketer) =

English cricketer (born 1994)

Personal information
- Full name: Jack Michael Wood
- Born: 4 November 1994 (age 32); Reading, Berkshire, England
- Batting: Right-handed
- Bowling: Right-arm medium

Domestic team information
- Years: Team
- 2015–2016: Durham MCCU

Career statistics
Competition	FC
Matches	4
Runs scored	16
Batting average	8.00
100s/50s	–/–
Top score	14
Balls bowled	354
Wickets	3
Bowling average	78.33
5 wickets in innings	–
10 wickets in match	–
Best bowling	2/32
Catches/stumpings	–/–
- Source: Cricinfo, 11 August 2020

Jack Michael Wood (born 4 November 1994) is an English former first-class cricketer.

Wood was born at Reading in November 1994. He later studied at Durham University, where he made four appearances in first-class cricket for Durham MCCU, playing twice in 2015 against Somerset and Durham and twice in 2016 against Gloucestershire and Durham. Playing as a right-arm medium pace bowler, he took 3 wickets in his four matches at an average of 78.33, with best figures of 2 for 32.
