= William Dobson (antiquary) =

British journalist and antiquary (1820–1884)

William Dobson (1820–1884) was an English journalist and antiquary.

== Life ==
William Dobson came from a family of agriculturists seated at Tarleton in Lancashire. His father was Lawrence Dobson, a stationer and part proprietor with Isaac Wilcockson of the Preston Chronicle. He was born at Preston in 1820, and educated at the grammar school of that town. He afterwards engaged in the various branches of newspaper work. On the retirement of Wilcockson he acquired a partnership interest in the Chronicle, and was for some years the editor. His career as a journalist came practically to an end in March 1868, when the proprietorship of the Chronicle was transferred to Anthony Hewitson. He continued, however, along with his brother, to carry on the stationery business in Fishergate. In August 1866 he first entered the town council, with the especial object of opening up more fully for the public the advantages of Dr. Shepherd's library. He remained in the town council until November 1872, and subsequently sat from 1874 to November 1883.

Dobson died on 8 August 1884, aged sixty-four, at Churton Road, Chester, and was buried on 11 August in Chester cemetery.

== Works ==
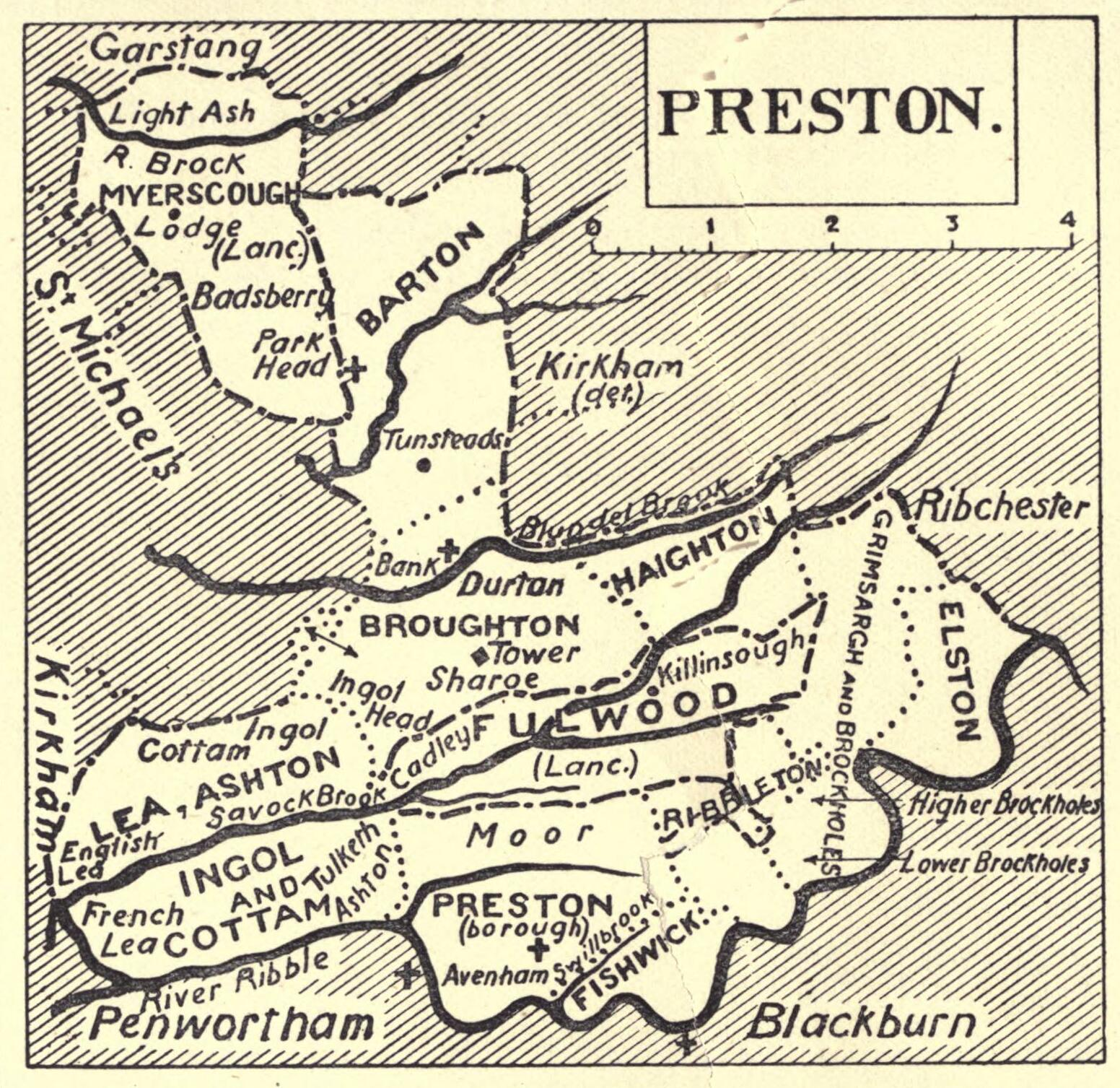
Map of the parish of Preston.

Dobson, who was a member of the Chetham Society, possessed an extensive knowledge of local history and antiquities. He was the author of:

- History of the Parliamentary Representation of Preston during the last Hundred Years, 8vo, Preston, 1856 (2nd edition), 12mo, Preston [printed], London, 1868.
- Preston in the Olden Time; or, Illustrations of the Manners and Customs in Preston in the Seventeenth and Eighteenth Centuries. A Lecture, 12mo, Preston, 1857.
- An Account of the Celebration of Preston Guild in 1862, 12mo, Preston [1862].
- Rambles by the Ribble, 3 series (1, 2, 3), 8vo, Preston, 1864–83, 3rd edition, 8vo, Preston, 1877, &c.
- The Story of our Town Hall, 8vo, Preston, 1879.

Some of his other writings were:

- A Memoir of John Gornall,
- A Memoir of Richard Palmer, formerly Town Clerk of Preston,
- The Story of Proud Preston,
- A History and Description of the Ancient Houses in the Market Place, Preston,
- A History of Lancashire Signboards,
- The Preston Municipal Elections from 1835 to 1862.

He also published Extracts from the Diary of the Rev. Peter Walkden, Nonconformist Minister, for the years 1725, 1729, and 1730, with Notes, 12mo, Preston [printed], London, 1866, a piece of local biography, and joined John Harland, FSA, of Manchester, in writing A History of Preston Guild; the Ordinances of various Guilds Merchant, the Custumal of Preston, the Charters to the Borough, the Incorporated Companies, List of Mayors from 1327, &c., 12mo, Preston [1862], followed by two other editions.

== Sources ==
- Farrer, William; Brownbill, J., eds. (1912). The Victoria History of the County of Lancaster. Vol. 7. London: Constable & Co. Ltd. pp. 72, 81.
- Lawson, Zoë (2004). "Dobson, William (bap. 1820, d. 1884), journalist and antiquary". Oxford Dictionary of National Biography. Oxford University Press. Retrieved 8 September 2022.
- "Search Results for: "William Dobson"". Preston History. Retrieved 8 September 2022.

Attribution:

- This article incorporates text from a publication now in the public domain: Goodwin, Gordon (1888). "Dobson, William (1820-1884)". In Stephen, Leslie (ed.). Dictionary of National Biography. Vol. 15. London: Smith, Elder & Co. p. 138.
