= Ben Williams (cricketer, born 1992) =

English cricketer

Personal information
- Full name: Ben Williams
- Born: 24 June 1992 (age 34); Whiston, Lancashire, England
- Height: 6 ft 0 in (1.83 m)
- Batting: Right-handed
- Bowling: Right-arm slow-medium

Domestic team information
- Years: Team
- 2011–2013: Oxford MCCU
- 2011–2013: Oxford University

Career statistics
Competition	First-class
Matches	9
Runs scored	399
Batting average	30.69
100s/50s	–/2
Top score	92
Balls bowled	138
Wickets	1
Bowling average	130.00
5 wickets in innings	–
10 wickets in match	–
Best bowling	1/55
Catches/stumpings	5/–
- Source: Cricinfo, 9 April 2020

Ben Williams (born 24 June 1992) is an English banker and former first-class cricketer.

Williams was born in June 1992 at Whiston, Lancashire. He was educated initially at the Wade Deacon High School in Widnes, before attending Shrewsbury School at a sixth form entrant. From Shrewsbury, he went up to Hertford College, Oxford. He played first-class cricket while at Oxford, making his debut for Oxford MCCU against Lancashire at Oxford in 2011. (Note: Oxford MCCU differs from Oxford University Cricket Club in that it is open to students at Oxford Brookes University, whereas Oxford University Cricket Club is exclusively for students of the constituent colleges of the University of Oxford.) He played first-class cricket while at Oxford until 2013, making six appearances for Oxford MCCU, in addition to playing for Oxford University against Cambridge University in The University Matches of 2011, 2012 and 2013. In nine first-class matches, Williams scored 399 runs at an average of 30.69, with a high score of 92. In September 2011, he was twelfth man for England during the Third Test of their series against India.

After graduating from Oxford, Williams moved into the financial industry and is currently employed by Morgan Stanley.
