= Delroy Taylor =

Jamaican cricketer

Personal information
- Full name: Delroy Bertram Taylor
- Born: 30 June 1975 (age 51); St Catherine, Jamaica
- Nickname: Michael Masters
- Batting: Right-handed
- Bowling: Right-arm medium

Domestic team information
- Years: Team
- 2003: Durham UCCE
- 1995/96: Jamaica

Career statistics
Competition	First-class
Matches	3
Runs scored	206
Batting average	34.33
100s/50s	–/2
Top score	82
Balls bowled	102
Wickets	2
Bowling average	50.00
5 wickets in innings	–
10 wickets in match	–
Best bowling	1/35
Catches/stumpings	1/–
- Source: Cricinfo, 21 August 2011

Delroy Bertram Taylor (born 30 June 1975) is a former Jamaican cricketer. Taylor was a right-handed batsman who bowled right-arm medium pace. He was born in St Catherine, Jamaica.

Having played Youth Test and Youth One Day Internationals for West Indies Under-19s, Taylor made a single first-class appearance for Jamaica against the touring English county of Lancashire in 1996. In this match, he took the wicket of Michael Atherton in Lancashire's first-innings for the cost of 65 runs from 10 overs, while in Lancashire's second-innings he took the wicket of Warren Hegg for the cost of 35 runs from 7 overs. In Jamaicas first-innings, Taylor scored 60 runs before he was dismissed by Mike Watkinson, while in their second-innings he was dismissed by the same bowler for 20. Despite what was a fairly successful debut, Taylor made no further appearances for Jamaica in any format.

Later in 2003, while he studying at Durham University in England for his degree, Taylor made a single first-class appearance for Durham UCCE against Nottinghamshire. In this match, he scored 82 runs in the university's first-innings, before being dismissed by Paul Franks, while in their second-innings the same bowler dismissed him for a single run. In that same season, he made a single first-class appearance for British Universities against the touring Zimbabweans. In this match, he was dismissed in the teams first-innings for 16 runs by Douglas Hondo, while in their second-innings the same bowler dismissed him for 27 runs.
