= Ben Williams (cricketer, born 1993) =

English cricketer

Personal information
- Full name: Benjamin Peter Robert Williams
- Born: 28 October 1993 (age 33); Plymouth, Devon, England
- Height: 6 ft 0 in (1.83 m)
- Batting: Right-handed
- Bowling: Left-arm medium-fast

Domestic team information
- Years: Team
- 2015: Durham MCCU
- 2015: Devon

Career statistics
| Competition | First-class |
|---|---|
| Matches | 1 |
| Runs scored | 0 |
| Batting average | 0.00 |
| 100s/50s | –/– |
| Top score | 0* |
| Balls bowled | 102 |
| Wickets | 1 |
| Bowling average | 85.00 |
| 5 wickets in innings | – |
| 10 wickets in match | – |
| Best bowling | 1/66 |
| Catches/stumpings | –/– |
- Source: Cricinfo, 11 August 2020

Benjamin Peter Robert Williams (born 28 October 1993) is an English former first-class cricketer.

Williams was born at Plymouth in October 1993. He was educated at Mount Kelly School, before going up to Durham University. While studying at Durham, he made a single appearance in first-class cricket for Durham MCCU against Durham in 2015. Williams batted twice in the match, being dismissed without scoring by Scott Borthwick in the Durham MCCU first innings, while in their second innings he was unbeaten without scoring. With his left-arm medium-fast bowling, he took a single wicket, that of Mark Stoneman. In addition to playing first-class cricket, Williams has also played minor counties cricket for Devon in 2015.
