= Tim Alexander (politician) =

American attorney and politician

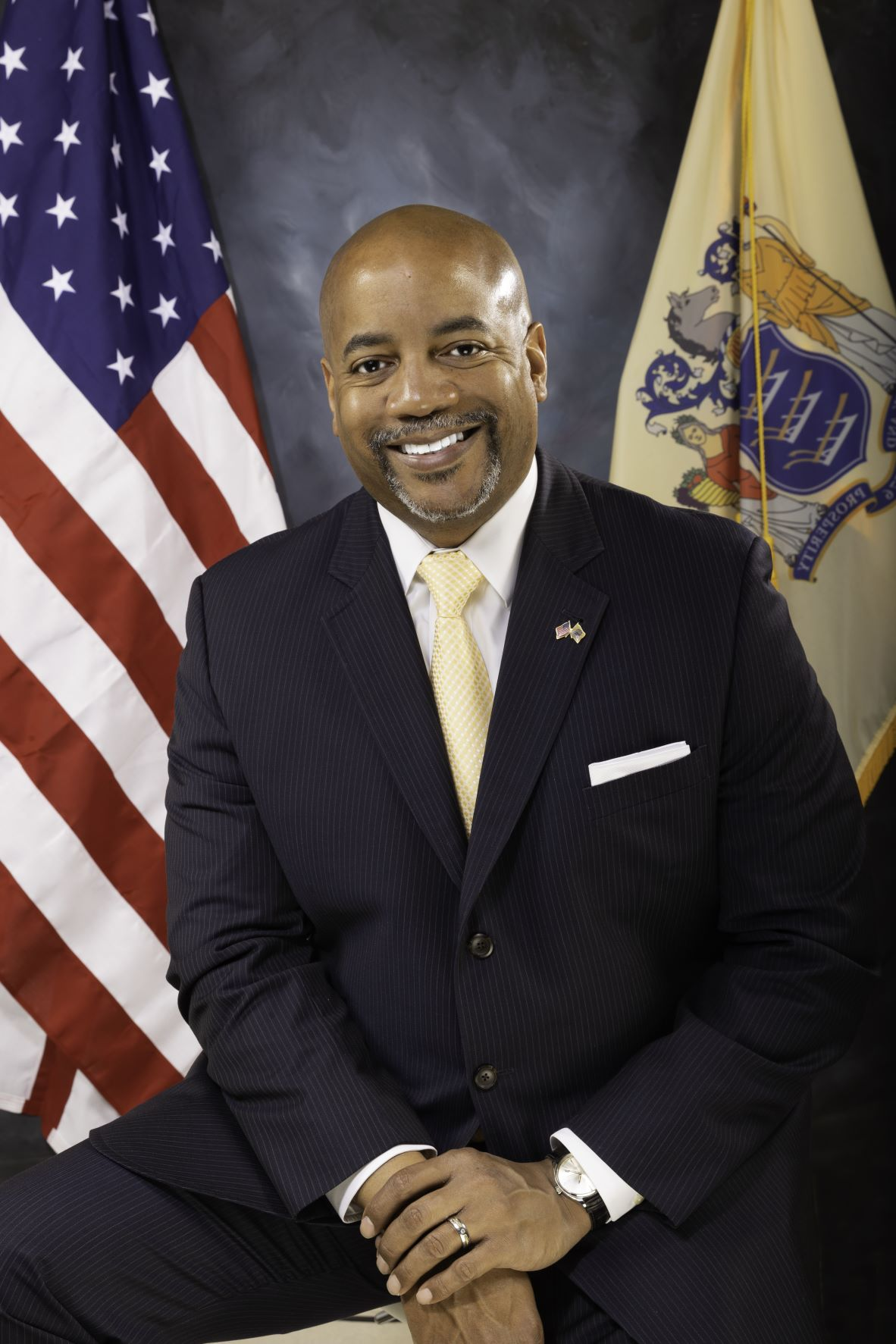
- Tim Alexander’s official portrait, with the United States and New Jersey state flags in the background.

Personal details
- Born: Newark, New Jersey, U.S.
- Party: Democratic
- Spouse: Anna Alexander
- Children: 3
- Education: Drexel University (BS, MBA) Rutgers University School of Law–Camden (JD)
- Occupation: Attorney

Tim Alexander is an American former law enforcement officer, attorney, and political candidate from New Jersey. He is a member of the Democratic Party and the party’s nominee in the 2024 U.S. House race for New Jersey's 2nd congressional district. He was also the Democratic nominee in the 2022 election for the same seat.

== Early life and education ==
Alexander was born in Newark, New Jersey, and moved to South Jersey in 1980. He earned a Bachelor of Science degree in business management, graduating summa cum laude from Drexel University in 2006. He received an MBA in 2008 and a Juris Doctor from Rutgers University School of Law–Camden in 2012.

== Career ==
Alexander served as a Detective Captain leading the Criminal Investigation Section at the Atlantic County Prosecutor’s Office. He later worked as a Major Trials Prosecutor at the Philadelphia District Attorney’s Office and in Philadelphia’s Civil Rights Unit. He is currently “Of Counsel” at the law firm Helmer, Conley & Kasselman, P.A., specializing in civil litigation.

== Political career ==
=== 2022 congressional campaign ===
In 2022, Alexander was the Democratic nominee for New Jersey’s 2nd Congressional District, challenging incumbent Jeff Van Drew. He lost the general election with approximately 40 percent of the vote.

=== 2024 congressional campaign ===
In August 2024, Alexander announced his second bid for Congress, with campaign launch events in Millville and Atlantic City. He won the Atlantic County Democratic convention with 58% of delegate votes.

Alexander has received endorsements from Assemblywoman Shavonda Sumter, Atlantic City Council President Aaron Randolph and Council Members Kaleem Shabazz and Stephanie Marshall, UNITE HERE Local 54, Moms Demand Action (Gun Sense Candidate distinction), the Berkeley Township Democratic Club, and Pleasantville Mayor Judy M. Ward.

== Political positions ==
According to Ballotpedia and The Well News, Alexander has expressed support for:

- Expanding public transit and federal infrastructure investment
- Civil rights and criminal justice reform
- Women’s rights, including equal pay and paid family leave
- LGBTQ+ rights, including the Equality Act
- Voting rights protections, including H.R. 1 and the John Lewis Voting Rights Act
- Environmental protections and climate action
- Refusal of corporate PAC money in his campaigns

== Personal life ==
Alexander lives in South Jersey with his wife, Anna, and their three children.

== Electoral history ==
New Jersey’s 2nd congressional district, 2022
Party	Candidate	Votes	%	±%
Democratic	Tim Alexander	116,891	40.1	
Republican	Jeff Van Drew	174,680	59.9	
