= William Polk Dobson =

American politician

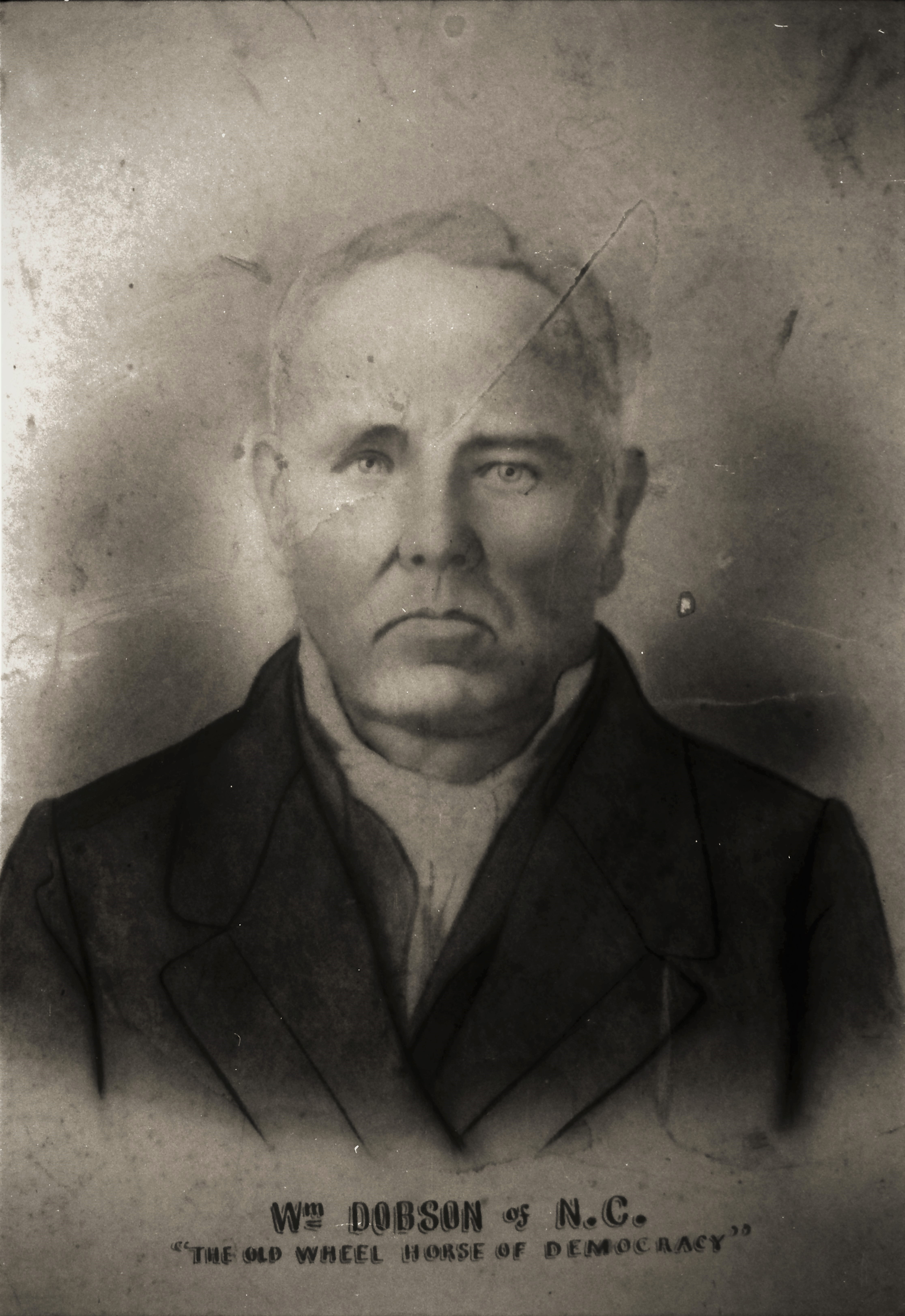
William Polk Dobson

William Polk Dobson (1783–1846) was a prominent 19th century North Carolina politician in Surry County

Born in Rockford, North Carolina, Dobson was a state senator, representing Surry County in the state senate in Raleigh in 1818–1819, 1827, 1830–1834, 1836, and 1842. The current county seat of Surry County, Dobson, is named for him.

William Polk Dobson was first cousins and allies of President James Knox Polk.

Polk died in Rockford, Surry County, North Carolina, 1846 (age about 53 years).
