= John Dewes =

English cricketer

Personal information
- Full name: John Gordon Dewes
- Born: 11 October 1926; Latchford, Cheshire, England
- Died: 12 May 2015 (aged 88)
- Batting: Left-handed
- Bowling: Right-arm medium
- Relatives: Jim Dewes (son); Jonathan Dewes (grandson)

International information
- National side: England
- Test debut: 14 August 1948 v Australia
- Last Test: 22 December 1950 v Australia

Domestic team information
- Years: Team
- 1948–1950: Cambridge University
- 1948–1956: Middlesex
- 1948–1950/51: Marylebone Cricket Club

Career statistics
Competition	Test	First-class
Matches	5	137
Runs scored	121	8,564
Batting average	12.09	41.77
100s/50s	0/1	18/45
Top score	67	212
Balls bowled	–	114
Wickets	–	2
Bowling average	–	35.50
5 wickets in innings	–	0
10 wickets in match	–	0
Best bowling	–	1/0
Catches/stumpings	0/–	48/–
- Source: CricInfo, 10 September 2022

John Gordon Dewes (11 October 1926 – 12 May 2015) was an English cricketer, who played for Cambridge University and Middlesex, and was chosen for five Test matches between 1948 and 1950.

== Life and career ==
Dewes was a protégé of E. J. H. Nash, the British Evangelical Anglican clergyman and founder of the Iwerne camps (along with fellow cricketer David Sheppard). In 1945, he was one of three relative unknowns from public schools included in the England side for the third Victory Test against Australia at Lord's (it was his first-class debut). The others were Donald Carr from Repton School and the Etonian, Luke White. Dewes had left Aldenham School the previous year. In the event, the three contributed little, and did not appear again in the other Victory matches.

Dewes did National Service in the Royal Navy, then went up to St John's College, Cambridge, in 1947. At Cambridge he won Blues for both cricket and hockey. His cricket Test debut came against Donald Bradman's formidable side in 1948, when he struggled to make runs against the opening attack of Ray Lindwall and Keith Miller. The next season, he shared a record unbeaten stand of 429 with Hubert Doggart for Cambridge against Essex and, in 1950, added 343 for the first wicket with David Sheppard in the Cambridge total of 594-4 declared against the touring West Indians. The 1950 season was Dewes' peak, and he scored 2,432 runs in the full season at an average of 59.31, with nine centuries.

He played two Test matches against the West Indies that summer and, in the first of them, made 67 in an unsuccessful rearguard action against the spin of Sonny Ramadhin and Alf Valentine. He was also picked for the tour to Australia of 1950-51 and played two Tests there. But in all Tests he reached double figures on just three occasions, and only once passed 50.

After this tour, he became a teacher and was never able to play more than a few matches each season, although as late as 1955 he made 644 runs in seven matches. His final first-class match was in 1957. He was a master at Tonbridge School and Rugby School and was headmaster of Barker College, Sydney, from 1958 to 1963. He then returned to England as a housemaster and head of careers at Dulwich College until his retirement in 1987. Among his pupils was Nigel Farage who paid tribute in his autobiography to the advice he received.

His son, Anthony ('Jim'), played first-class cricket as a batsman for Cambridge University in 1978 and 1979. Dewes died on 12 May 2015 at the age of 88.
