= Alistair Maiden =

English cricketer

Personal information
- Full name: Alistair Jonathan Maiden
- Born: 15 September 1982 (age 44); Stourbridge, Worcestershire, England
- Batting: Right-handed

Domestic team information
- Years: Team
- 2002–2005: Durham UCCE
- 2006: Staffordshire
- 2007–2009: Northumberland

Career statistics
Competition	First-class
Matches	10
Runs scored	468
Batting average	36.00
100s/50s	1/2
Top score	211*
Catches/stumpings	3/–
- Source: Cricinfo, 15 February 2022

Alistair Jonathan Maiden (born 15 September 1982) is an English cricket coach.

Maiden was a right-handed batsman, born in Stourbridge, Worcestershire.

While studying for his degree in management at Durham University, Maiden made his first-class debut for Durham UCCE against Lancashire in 2002. He made eight first-class appearances, the last of which came against Durham in 2005.

In his nine first-class matches for the university, he scored 448 runs at an average of 37.33, with a high score of 211 not out. This score, which was his only first-class century, came against Somerset in 2005. It became the highest individual first-class score for Durham University, and the first to be a double-century. While studying at Durham University, he also made a single first-class appearance for British Universities against the touring Bangladeshis in 2005. He batted once in this match, scoring 20 runs before being dismissed by Mashrafe Mortaza.

Maiden also played Minor counties cricket, starting with Staffordshire who he made three Minor Counties Championship appearances for in 2006. For the 2007 season he joined Northumberland, who he made four Minor Counties Championship appearances and a single MCCA Knockout Trophy appearance for between 2007 and 2009.

He was appointed an assistant coach by Yorkshire in February 2022.

In August 2024, Maiden was appointed as head coach of Warwickshire-based Bears Women for the 2025 season. Three months later he was also announced as the new Birmingham Phoenix women's head coach for the 2025 edition of The Hundred.
