= Glen Read =

English cricketer

Glen George Read was born on 4 September 1981 in Cuckfield, West Sussex and played cricket in his formative years for Sussex 2nd XI before going to Durham University and making his first-class debut for the university side. Read also represented the British Universities. Read is a tall left arm medium-fast swing bowler. He has had strong performances against the counties and Bangladesh, with the prize scalp of Mohammad Ashraful. Read also played against the Sri Lankan A touring side in 2004 picking up three wickets. Read also played in the North East Premier League for Philadelphia and Chester-le-Street Cricket Clubs, and in the Middlesex League for Southgate CC. He now works for the MCC.
