= David Owen Brown =

English cricketer (born 1982)

David Owen Brown (born 8 December 1982 in Burnley, Lancashire) is an English first-class cricketer. He is a right-handed batsman and right-armed medium bowler.

== Early life ==
Brown was born in Burnley, Lancashire, attending Queen Elizabeth's Grammar School in neighbouring Blackburn. Like many of his family, he began playing cricket for Burnley Cricket Club. His older brother, Michael, played for Surrey.

== Career ==
Brown played for Gloucestershire County Cricket Club from 2006 until 2009. At the end of the 2009 season Brown joined Glamorgan County Cricket Club. He has also represented Durham UCCE, British Universities and Lancashire 2nd XI.
