= Durham University Centre of Cricketing Excellence =

UK cricket team

Durham MCC University
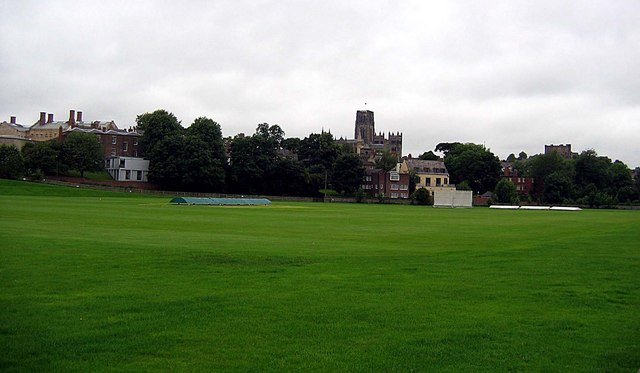

Personnel
- Coach: Paul Grayson

Team information
- Founded: 1846 (Durham University Cricket Club); 1996 (Durham UCCE)
- Home ground: The Racecourse
- Secondary home ground: Maiden Castle sports centre

History
- First-class debut: Durham County Cricket Club in 2001 at the Riverside Ground

Durham University Centre of Cricketing Excellence (Durham UCCE), known as Durham MCC University (Durham MCCU) from 2010 to 2020, is a cricket coaching centre based at Durham University in Durham, County Durham, England, and the name under which the Durham University Cricket Club (DUCC) first team plays.

== History ==
The earliest record of cricket being played by Durham University was in 1842, at Sunderland on 17 June 1842, with the university taking a 58 run victory. The earliest recorded home match was in 1843, against a Sunderland team at The Racecourse, which has remained the university's home ground ever since and is the oldest university ground in England. (Note: Oxford University Cricket Club's ground at The Parks has been in use since 1881, while Cambridge University Cricket Club have used Fenners since 1848) Durham University Cricket Club was formed in 1846. It initially played against other local teams, with the first inter-university fixture being a match against the University of Edinburgh, played at Durham in June 1896. In 1981, Durham became the first university other than Oxford or Cambridge to play against a county side, with a three-day match against Nottinghamshire at The Racecourse.

The Durham University Centre of Cricketing Excellence was established as a training centre by Graeme Fowler in 1996; he would continue as Durham's head coach until stepping down in protest at changes introduced by the MCC in 2015. He was succeeded by Essex coach Paul Grayson.

The UCCE model was adopted nationally by the England and Wales Cricket Board (ECB) in 2000, with the establishment of five other UCCEs at Cambridge, Cardiff, Oxford, Leeds/Bradford and Loughborough. With the exception of Loughborough, these were all multi-institution centres. The scheme transferred to the Marylebone Cricket Club (MCC) in 2004, with the UCCEs becoming MCC Universities from 2010. As Durham MCC University, the coaching centre was largely funded by the Marylebone Cricket Club (MCC). In 2020, the universities programme returned to the ECB.

From 2001, Durham joined Oxford and Cambridge in having matches against first-class counties considered as first-class matches, playing their first first-class match against Durham County Cricket Club at the Riverside Ground in Chester-le-Street on 16 April 2021. Their first home first-class match was played at The Racecourse against Lancashire on 13 June 2001. This would eventually expand to include Loughborough UCCE from 2003 and all of the MCCUs from 2012. In 2012, Durham MCCU were dismissed for 18 against Durham County Cricket Club, the lowest first-class innings total since 1983. First class status was removed from all university matches after 2020, with the final first-class matches in 2020 being cancelled due to the Covid pandemic.

After obtaining first-class status in 2001, the university produced a large number of cricketers who obtained professional county contracts, while others such as James Foster went on to play international cricket. Prior to first-class status, players such as Andrew Strauss and Nasser Hussain played for the university's cricket club.

As Durham University Centre of Cricketing Excellence, the team played 27 first-class matches from 2001 to 2009. As Durham Marylebone Cricket Club University, the team played 21 first-class matches (not including one abandoned and two cancelled) from 2010 to 2020.

An expansion of the university's Maiden Castle sports centre in 2019 included the construction of an indoor cricket hall. This allowed Durham to host indoor cricket matches, which had previously been played at the Riverside Ground's indoor facility.

== Honours ==
- MCC Universities Two-Day Championship winners 2010
- MCC Universities Challenge Final winners 2010 and 2018
- BUCS Cricket Men's National Division winners 2018
- BUCS Cricket Men's Indoor Championship Finals winners 2022
- BUCS Cricket Women's National Championship winners 2022
- BUCS Cricket Men's Indoor Championship Super 8's winners 2023
- BUCS Cricket Men's Indoor Championship Finals winners 2024

== See also ==
- List of Durham UCCE & MCCU players – people who played first-class cricket for Durham UCCE or Durham MCCU
- List of Durham University people § Cricketers - notable cricketing alumni of Durham University
