= List of Loughborough MCCU players =

Loughborough MCC University, formerly Loughborough University Centre of Cricketing Excellence, was formed in 2003, and has appeared in first-class cricket since its formation. The players in this list have all played at least one first-class match for Loughborough MCCU. MCC funding came to an end in July 2020, although no matches were played in the 2020 season due to the restrictions put in place during the Coronavirus outbreak. In December 2019 the ECB announced that matches with MCCU teams would lose their first-class status as of the 2021 season.

Players are listed in order of appearance, where players made their debut in the same match, they are ordered by batting order.

== Key ==
General

- † – Wicket-keeper
- First – Year of First-class debut for Loughborough MCCU
- Last – Year of latest First-class match for Loughborough MCCU
- Mat – Number of First-class appearances for Loughborough MCCU

Batting

- Runs – Runs scored in career
- HS – Highest score
- Avg – Runs scored per dismissal
- * – Batsman remained not out

Bowling

- Balls – Balls bowled in career
- Wkt – Wickets taken in career
- BBI – Best bowling in an innings
- Ave – Average runs per wicket

Fielding

- Ca – Catches taken
- St – Stumpings effected
All statistics correct as of the end of the English 2019 cricket season.

== List of players ==
Loughborough MCC University First-class players
No.	Name	Nationality	First	Last	Mat	Runs	HS	Avg	Balls	Wkt	BBI	Ave	Ca	St	Ref(s)
No.	Name	Nationality	First	Last	Mat	Batting			Bowling				Fielding		Ref(s)
1	Rob White	England	2003	2003	3	144	76	24.00	66	0	–	–	2	0	
2	James Adams ‡	England	2003	2004	6	318	107	28.90	90	2	2/24	24.00	1	0	
3	John Francis	England	2003	2003	3	127	57	21.16	0	–	–	–	0	0	
4	Vikram Atri	England	2003	2005	9	435	82*	31.07	6	0	–	–	3	0	
5	Chris Nash	England	2003	2004	6	363	63	36.30	352	3	1/5	95.33	3	0	
6	Zoheb Sharif	England	2003	2003	3	199	67	39.80	312	2	2/101	121.00	0	0	
7	Richard King	England	2003	2008	11	171	31	11.40	1,071	16	4/34	51.43	1	0	
8	Lee Goddard †	England	2003	2003	3	48	23*	16.00	0	–	–	–	2	0	
9	David Wigley ‡	England	2003	2004	4	49	23*	12.25	678	10	4/133	49.50	2	0	
10	James Anyon	England	2003	2004	5	23	21	7.66	630	7	3/57	70.57	2	0	
11	Ryan Cummins	England	2003	2005	6	29	26	9.66	1,020	8	3/34	86.12	0	0	
12	Phil Lewis	England	2003	2004	5	115	43*	28.75	606	10	3/58	40.20	1	0	
13	Richard Clinton	England	2004	2006	6	360	108*	45.00	24	0	–	–	2	0	
14	Chris Benham	England	2004	2004	3	128	38*	32.00	0	–	–	–	0	0	
15	Paul Harrison †	England	2004	2006	7	261	54	29.00	0	–	–	–	11	0	
16	Marc Rosenberg	South Africa	2004	2004	2	6	3	3.00	37	1	1/27	27.00	0	0	
17	Monty Panesar	England	2004	2004	3	12	12*	6.00	516	5	3/28	39.40	1	0	
18	Richard Wilkinson	England	2004	2005	5	119	49	19.83	516	5	2/24	64.20	5	0	
19	George Walker	England	2004	2004	1	5	5	5.00	42	0	–	–	0	0	
20	Will Gifford ‡	England	2005	2007	8	252	71	22.90	0	–	–	–	4	0	
21	Krishana Singh	England	2005	2005	3	54	29*	13.50	0	–	–	–	3	0	
22	Chris Murtagh	England	2005	2007	8	259	107	23.54	6	0	–	–	5	0	
23	Steven Clark	England	2005	2005	3	57	47*	28.50	506	11	5/29	23.09	1	0	
24	David Wainwright	England	2005	2006	5	116	47	29.00	719	12	4/48	36.58	4	0	
24	Nick Clewley	England	2005	2005	2	3	2*	–	444	3	2/132	85.66	1	0	
25	David Holt	France	2005	2006	2	5	5	5.00	0	–	–	–	1	0	
26	Edward Foster †	England	2005	2007	6	291	105	32.33	0	–	–	–	5	1	
27	Damian Shirazi	Wales	2006	2006	2	104	46*	52.00	36	1	1/33	33.00	2	0	
28	Richard Morris	England	2006	2008	5	97	88	24.25	360	5	2/58	54.80	1	0	
29	Ruel Brathwaite	Barbados	2006	2008	5	129	76*	24.25	690	7	3/77	67.85	1	0	
30	Daniel Miller	England	2006	2006	2	0	0*	–	276	2	1/11	75.00	0	0	
31	Liam Lewis	England	2007	2007	2	26	21	6.50	0	–	–	–	1	0	
32	Matthew Spriegel ‡	England	2007	2008	6	217	48	21.70	468	6	2/73	41.66	4	0	
33	Stephen Wheeler	England	2007	2007	3	33	13	8.25	412	1	1/72	312.00	1	0	
34	Arun Harinath	England	2007	2009	6	182	69	22.75	24	0	–	–	3	0	
35	Jonny Hughes	England	2007	2008	6	149	45	21.28	355	7	3/33	34.14	0	0	
36	Jigar Naik	England	2007	2007	2	26	15	26.00	234	2	1/72	102.50	0	0	
37	Tom Parsons	England	2007	2008	5	24	12	6.00	599	8	3/70	39.00	0	0	
38	Johan Malcolm	Denmark	2007	2008	4	262	93	37.42	132	1	1/40	83.00	2	0	
39	Daniel Williams	England	2008	2008	2	25	11	8.33	0	–	–	–	0	0	
40	Paul Borrington	England	2008	2009	6	352	105	70.40	0	–	–	–	2	0	
41	Thomas Flowers	England	2008	2008	2	51	25*	25.50	0	–	–	–	1	0	
42	Daniel Pratt †	England	2008	2008	3	52	47	26.00	0	–	–	–	2	1	
43	Henry Jones	England	2008	2009	5	8	6*	2.66	546	6	4/47	57.33	1	0	
44	Alan Cope ‡	England	2008	2010	3	84	51	16.80	24	0	–	–	0	0	
45	Michael Baer	Wales	2008	2009	4	12	8	12.00	516	3	2/19	110.00	0	0	
46	Phil Hayes	England	2009	2009	2	38	38	38.00	0	–	–	–	0	0	
47	Ashleigh Lynch ‡	England	2009	2009	3	96	61	32.00	6	0	–	–	2	0	
48	Charl Malan	England	2009	2010	4	43	24	10.75	402	4	1/28	44.50	0	0	
49	David Murphy ‡†	Scotland	2009	2011	8	313	76	31.30	0	–	–	–	16	3	
50	Gavin Baker	England	2009	2014	8	305	66	30.50	933	8	2/35	93.87	1	0	
51	Peter Groves	England	2009	2010	5	139	52	69.50	474	11	5/72	31.72	0	0	
52	Alasdair Evans	Scotland	2009	2009	2	–	–	–	150	3	2/41	42.33	0	0	
53	Rhodri Evans	Wales	2009	2010	6	123	44	17.57	288	2	1/57	114.50	2	0	
54	James Ord	England	2009	2009	1	10	9	5.00	0	–	–	–	0	0	
55	William Tavaré	England	2010	2012	5	262	61	32.75	0	–	–	–	0	0	
56	Tom Winslade	England	2010	2010	1	18	17	9.00	0	–	–	–	0	0	
57	Harveer Gandam	England	2010	2011	3	69	33	17.25	6	0	–	–	1	0	
58	Alex Welsh	England	2010	2010	2	30	21	15.00	256	4	3/32	38.00	1	0	
59	Robert Taylor ‡	Scotland	2010	2012	7	238	101*	23.80	933	16	3/82	46.93	3	0	
60	Simon Rose	England	2010	2010	2	14	14	14.00	318	1	1/72	216.00	0	0	
61	DannyJo Cox	England	2011	2011	2	32	18	8.00	0	–	–	–	0	0	
62	Darius D'Souza	Canada	2011	2013	3	56	23	11.20	12	0	–	–	0	0	
63	Sam Billings †	England	2011	2012	4	321	131	45.85	0	–	–	–	3	0	
64	Nitesh Patel	England	2011	2012	5	101	46	11.22	0	–	–	–	2	0	
65	Dimitri Ratnayake	Sri Lanka	2011	2013	5	164	46	18.22	120	2	1/22	38.00	2	0	
66	Oliver Wilkin	England	2011	2011	3	138	38	23.00	300	4	2/63	53.25	1	0	
67	Adam Soilleux	England	2011	2014	6	50	22	7.14	828	16	3/37	33.37	1	0	
68	Ravi Patel	England	2011	2011	3	23	9*	7.66	406	7	3/25	33.42	0	0	
69	Maurice Holmes	England	2011	2011	2	6	4*	6.00	270	3	3/46	61.00	0	0	
70	Michael Turns	England	2011	2011	2	120	80	60.00	144	3	1/22	36.00	2	0	
71	Oliver James	Wales	2011	2011	1	8	8	8.00	134	1	1/91	102.00	1	0	
72	Martin Fearon	England	2011	2011	1	8	8	4.00	90	0	–	–	1	0	
73	Ian Sturmer	England	2011	2012	2	12	5	6.00	180	2	1/35	80.50	2	0	
74	Frederick Daeche-Marshall	England	2012	2012	2	36	32	12.00	0	–	–	–	0	0	
75	Devon Endersby	South Africa	2012	2014	6	107	53	11.88	414	4	1/38	72.75	6	0	
76	Adam Riley ‡	England	2012	2014	5	49	22*	8.16	733	16	5/62	26.93	3	0	
77	Toby Lester	England	2012	2014	6	5	2*	1.66	840	6	2/58	88.33	0	0	
78	Aiden Morris	England	2012	2013	2	33	18*	11.00	162	2	1/47	53.50	1	0	
79	Adam Wilson	England	2012	2012	1	6	6	6.00	168	1	1/24	97.00	0	0	
80	Jack Cornick	England	2013	2013	2	11	10	3.66	0	–	–	–	1	0	
81	Anish Patel ‡	England	2013	2015	6	218	83	24.22	0	–	–	–	1	0	
82	Matthew Cross †	Scotland	2013	2013	2	61	29	20.33	0	–	–	–	5	0	
83	Will MacVicar	England	2013	2014	4	188	79	31.33	390	3	2/46	77.00	3	0	
84	Mark Best	England	2014	2015	4	120	50	20.00	0	–	–	–	1	0	
85	Jack Sterland	England	2014	2014	2	42	27	14.00	6	0	–	–	1	0	
86	Michael Burgess ‡†	England	2014	2016	6	245	51	40.83	0	–	–	–	5	0	
87	Basil Akram	England	2014	2017	6	348	160	58.00	680	17	5/54	34.82	2	0	
88	Sam Grant	England	2014	2016	4	66	52	33.00	469	1	1/42	401.00	0	0	
89	Hasan Azad	Pakistan	2015	2019	9	331	99	33.10	6	0	–	–	3	0	
90	Nitish Kumar	Canada	2015	2017	6	214	141	40.66	444	8	2/63	50.37	1	0	
91	Ian Prowse	Ireland	2015	2015	2	23	15	11.50	186	2	1/12	60.50	0	0	
92	Robbie White †	England	2015	2017	6	110	69	18.33	0	–	–	–	6	0	
93	Robert McKinley	Ireland	2015	2015	2	39	39	19.50	234	4	3/67	50.25	0	0	
94	Bobby Gamble ‡	England	2015	2017	6	51	32	8.50	1,038	9	2/16	76.00	2	0	
95	Stu Whittingham	Scotland	2015	2015	1	0	0	0.00	108	1	1/77	109.00	0	0	
96	Tom Nugent	England	2015	2015	1	4	4*	–	150	3	2/32	35.66	1	0	
97	Charlie Thurston	England	2016	2018	6	158	126	26.33	18	0	–	–	1	0	
98	Charles Lowen †	England	2016	2016	2	121	66	60.50	0	–	–	–	2	2	
99	Oliver Haley	England	2016	2016	1	8	8	8.00	96	1	1/24	88.00	0	0	
100	Sam Cook	England	2016	2017	4	4	3	1.33	613	7	3/64	50.14	0	0	
101	Connor Nurse	England	2016	2016	1	4	4*	–	66	1	1/58	58.00	0	0	
102	Sam Evans	England	2017	2018	4	161	114	40.25	36	0	–	–	0	0	
103	James Bracey †	England	2017	2018	4	113	56	22.60	0	–	–	–	2	0	
104	Adam Tillcock ‡	England	2017	2019	6	139	60	23.16	710	1	1/53	401.00	3	0	
105	Ben Ladd-Gibbon	England	2017	2017	2	10	6*	10.00	198	4	3/47	45.50	0	0	
106	Oli Soames	England	2018	2018	2	21	19	10.50	0	–	–	–	1	0	
107	Nick Hammond	England	2018	2019	4	29	18	7.25	0	–	–	–	0	0	
108	Andrew Rishton	England	2018	2018	2	55	32*	55.00	210	2	1/44	55.50	0	0	
109	Chris Sanders	England	2018	2019	4	80	56	16.00	582	5	2/67	74.80	0	0	
110	Will Rollings	England	2018	2018	2	4	4	2.00	228	2	2/78	69.50	1	0	
111	William Pereira	England	2018	2019	4	32	28*	8.00	540	5	3/61	55.60	0	0	
112	Tom Haynes	England	2019	2019	1	19	13	9.50	0	–	–	–	0	0	
113	Nick Welch	Zimbabwe	2019	2019	2	67	44	22.33	0	–	–	–	0	0	
114	Louis Kimber	England	2019	2019	2	99	62	33.00	141	2	1/34	43.00	1	0	
115	Joseph Kendall	England	2019	2019	2	95	37*	47.50	0	–	–	–	0	0	
116	Adam King †	England	2019	2019	2	53	33	17.66	0	–	–	–	2	0	
117	Ben Bhabra	England	2019	2019	2	14	10	4.66	226	1	1/101	149.00	0	0	
118	Alex Evans	England	2019	2019	2	11	7*	11.00	366	3	3/49	50.00	0	0	
