= Danny Cox =

Daniel or Danny Cox may refer to:

- Daniel Allen Cox (born 1976), Canadian author and screenwriter
- Danny Cox (baseball) (born 1959), American baseball pitcher
- Daniel Cox (bishop) (1931–2021), American Anglican bishop
- Danny Cox (cricketer) (born 1992), English cricketer
- Danny Cox (ice hockey) (1903–1982), Canadian ice hockey forward
- Danny Cox (musician) (1943–2025), American musician
- Daniel Cox (physicist), American physicist
- Dan Cox (footballer) (born 2006), Welsh footballer
- Dan Cox (born 1974), American politician from Maryland
- Daniel Cox (born 1990), British tennis player
- Daniel Cox (physician) (died 1750), British physician
- Danny Cox (radio presenter), British radio presenter and journalist

== See also ==
- Daniel Coxe (1640–1730), governor of West Jersey
