= Sturmer =

Sturmer may refer to:

- Sturmer (comics), a fictional character in DC Comics
- Sturmer, Essex, a village in England
- Sturmer railway station
- Sturmer Pippin, an apple cultivar
- Andy Sturmer (born 1965), American singer-songwriter and music producer
- Ian Sturmer (born 1991), English cricketer
- Manfred Sturmer, a fictional classical musician invented by Michael Berkeley for a humorous BBC radio programme

== See also ==
- Stürmer (disambiguation)
