= Dawid Malan =

English cricketer (born 1987)

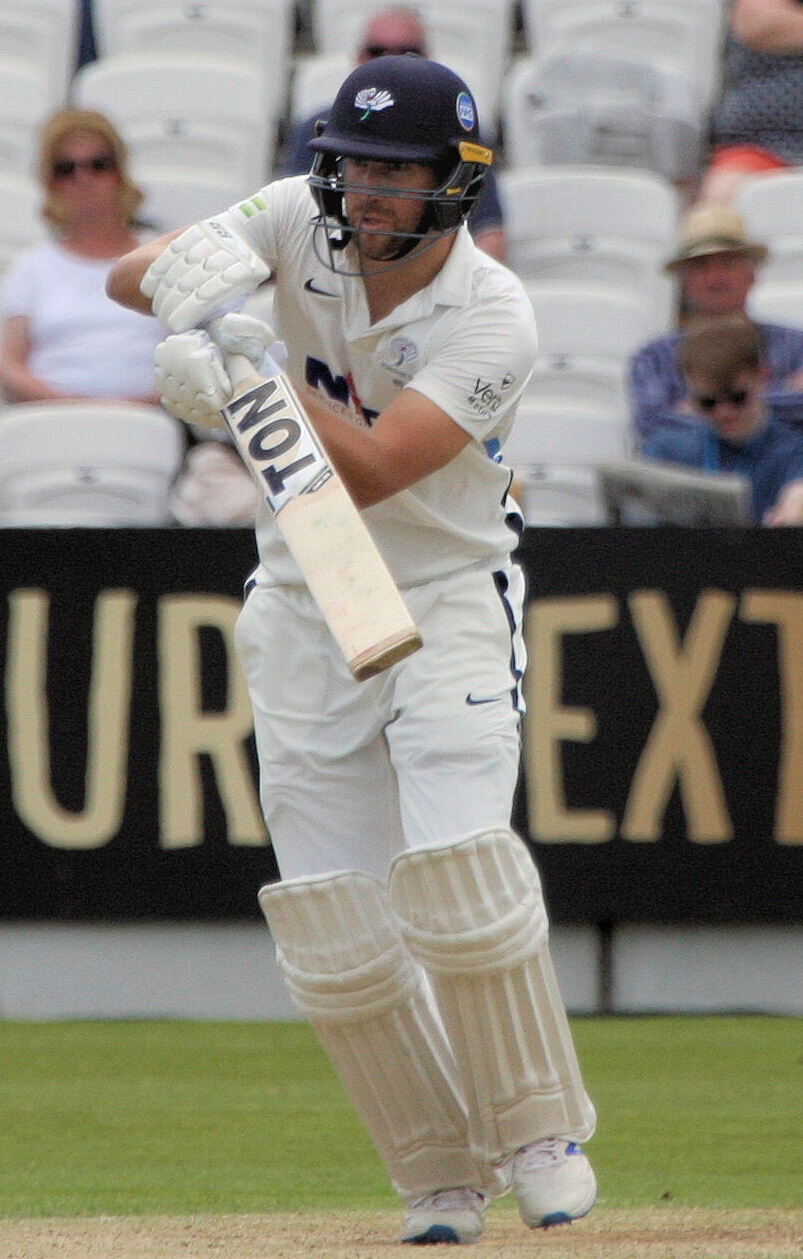
- Malan in 2021

Personal information
- Full name: Dawid Johannes Malan Jnr
- Born: 3 September 1987 (age 39); Roehampton, London, England
- Batting: Left-handed
- Bowling: Right-arm leg break
- Role: Top-order batter
- Relatives: Charl Malan (brother)

International information
- National side: England (2017–2023)
- Test debut (cap 677): 27 July 2017 v South Africa
- Last Test: 14 January 2022 v Australia
- ODI debut (cap 254): 3 May 2019 v Ireland
- Last ODI: 11 November 2023 v Pakistan
- ODI shirt no.: 29
- T20I debut (cap 81): 25 June 2017 v South Africa
- Last T20I: 5 September 2023 v New Zealand
- T20I shirt no.: 29

Domestic team information
- Years: Team
- 2005/06 (Note: Only teams that Malan has played for in more than one season or those for which he has appeared in first-class cricket are listed here.): Boland
- 2006–2019: Middlesex
- 2013/14–2014/15: Prime Doleshwar Sporting Club
- 2016–2017, 2019: Peshawar Zalmi
- 2020–2025: Yorkshire
- 2021: Punjab Kings
- 2021–2023: Trent Rockets
- 2025-2026: Chitwan Rhinos

Career statistics
Competition	Test	ODI	T20I	FC
Matches	22	30	62	217
Runs scored	1,074	1,450	1,892	13,593
Batting average	27.53	55.76	36.38	38.83
100s/50s	1/9	6/7	1/16	30/71
Top score	140	140	103*	219
Balls bowled	222	15	12	4,261
Wickets	2	1	1	63
Bowling average	65.50	17.00	27.00	40.76
5 wickets in innings	0	0	0	1
10 wickets in match	0	0	0	0
Best bowling	2/33	1/5	1/27	5/61
Catches/stumpings	13/–	11/–	22/–	207/–
- Source: ESPNcricinfo, 26 July 2025

Dawid Johannes Malan Jnr (/ˈdɑːvɪd məˈlæn/ DAH-vid mə-LAN; born 3 September 1987) is an English cricketer who has played for Yorkshire and Middlesex in English domestic cricket and in multiple Twenty20 leagues, including for Punjab Kings in the Indian Premier League. He played for England in all formats from 2017 until his retirement from international cricket in 2024.

Malan made his Test and Twenty20 International (T20I) debuts in 2017, and his One Day International (ODI) debuts in 2019. In 2020, his rating in the ICC Men's Player Rankings hit 915, which was a record in the format. He was part of the England team that won the 2022 T20 World Cup.

Malan is a left-handed top-order batter and occasional leg break bowler. He is also one of the only four batsmen from England to score a T20I century.

== Early life and education ==
Malan, who is of South African Afrikaner descent, was born in Roehampton, London. At the age of seven he and his family moved to South Africa, where he subsequently attended Paarl Boys' High School. Shortly after making his first class debut for Boland, he joined Middlesex, where he stayed for over a decade. He is also a supporter of Liverpool F.C.

His father, Dawid Malan Snr, represented Western Province B, Northern Transvaal B and Teddington, as a right-handed batter and a right-arm fast-medium bowler. His brother, Charl Malan, also played first-class cricket for Loughborough MCCU, whilst his sister, Liné, was an international field hockey player for South Africa.

== Personal life ==
Malan is married to Claire. They have one daughter.

== Domestic career ==
Malan is a left-handed batter and occasional leg-spin bowler who originally represented Boland in South Africa (2005/2006 season) and the MCC Young Cricketers in 2006. He joined Middlesex on 7 July 2006 and made his first XI debut in a Twenty20 Cup tie versus Surrey at The Oval on the same day.

In 2007 Malan was the top run scorer in the Second XI Championship with 969 runs at 51.00. He made his first-class debut for Middlesex in June 2008, scoring 132 not out. On 8 July 2008, Malan hit the 24th century in the history of the Twenty20 Cup, compiling 103 off 54 balls in the quarter-final against the Lancashire Lightning. This made him the first player to score a century batting at number six in a T20 match and he held the record for the highest score at the position until July 2018.

Malan played List-A domestic cricket for Prime Doleshwar Sporting Club in the Dhaka Premier League of Bangladesh for two seasons from 2013 to 2015, contributing with both bat and ball.

Malan was appointed as Middlesex captain across all three formats before the start of the 2018 season. He stepped down following the 2019 season and in November 2019, he signed a four-year contract to play for Yorkshire from the 2020 season. In August 2020, in the third round of matches in the 2020 Bob Willis Trophy, Malan scored his maiden double century in first-class cricket, with 219 runs.

He agreed a deal to play only limited overs cricket for Yorkshire in 2024. On 21 November 2025, it was announced Malan had left Yorkshire by "mutual consent" after the club released him from his contract a year early. Five days later he signed a deal with Gloucestershire to play for the club in the T20 Blast in 2026 and 2027.

== International career ==
Malan was named in England's Twenty20 International (T20I) squad for their home series against South Africa in June 2017. He made 78 on his debut, on 25 June 2017, with England winning the match and Malan adjudged 'man of the match' for his batting performance. He was added to England's Test squad, ahead of the third Test against South Africa, and made his Test debut on 27 July 2017 as a number 5 batsman. In the first innings, he made 1 before being bowled out by a yorker from Kagiso Rabada; in the second innings he was dismissed for 10. He also failed to impress in his second Test, raising questions over his Test future. However, Malan kept his place for the series against the West Indies and scored his maiden Test 50, helping England to win their first day-night Test.

Malan was selected for the winter tours to Australia and New Zealand, during the 3rd Ashes Test at the WACA in December 2017, Malan scored his first Test century: his 100 was the first century of the series from the England team. Malan continued his good form in T20Is on the tour, adding another three half-centuries in the four games he played in the Trans-Tasman Tri-Series, though this was not enough to see him keep his place in the team once rested players were recalled during the following English summer. He did retain his place for the two Tests against Pakistan and the first Test against India that summer, but was dropped after a poor run of form.

Malan was added to England's One Day International (ODI) squad for their one-off match against Ireland on 3 May 2019. He made 24 runs on his ODI debut for England in the match, as a number of their World Cup squad were rested.

Malan was recalled to the T20I squad for tour to New Zealand, and, on 8 November 2019 in the fourth T20I, Malan scored his first century. It was the second, and fastest, by an England batsman, coming from just 48 balls. He played in all six of England's T20Is against Pakistan and Australia in the summer of 2020, scoring 213 runs, with his performances moving him to first position in the ICC T20I batter rankings in September 2020. His good form in the format continued on the winter tour to South Africa, where two 'Player of the Match' performances of 55 and 99 not out in the second and third T20Is saw him reach the highest ever rating (915 points) in the ICC rankings.

In March 2021, during England's tour of India, Malan became the fastest batter to score 1,000 runs in T20Is in 24 innings.

In August 2021, Malan was recalled for the third Test of the 2021 test series against India. Malan scored 70 in the first innings. The following month, Malan was named in England's squad for the 2021 ICC Men's T20 World Cup.

In June 2022, in the opening match against the Netherlands, Malan scored his first century in ODI cricket. He made 125 runs, as part of England's score of 498 runs, the highest team total in ODI history. Malan was one of three centurions in the innings, along with Phil Salt and Jos Buttler. Malan also became the third English player to score a century in all three formats after Heather Knight and Jos Buttler; he also took his maiden ODI wicket, becoming the first and only English male player to have scored a century and taken a wicket in all three formats.

Later in the year, Malan was part of the winning England squad at the 2022 ICC Men's T20 World Cup. He scored a total of 56 runs in the group stage, but was injured in the final group game and missed the semi-final and final.

He was announced as part of England's provisional 15 man squad for the 2023 Cricket World Cup. He scored 140 runs off just 107 balls in the second game against Bangladesh.

Malan announced his retirement from international cricket on 28 August 2024. At the time, he had the fifth highest batting average (55.76) in one-day cricket, and after Kevin Pietersen, the second highest (36.38) amongst England players in T20 cricket. In the latter format, he was ranked the world's best player between September 2020 and November 2021, but struggled to gain public and media acceptance. Writing in Wisden Cricket Monthly, however, Laurence Booth commented that Malan deserved to be remembered for how "exhilarating he could be once he got into the groove".

== T20 franchise cricket ==
Malan played for Peshawar Zalmi in the first season of the Pakistan Super League (PSL) and continued with them the following season, in which they won the Final played in Lahore. He also played for Barisal Bulls in the fourth season of the Bangladesh Premier League (BPL).

In October 2018, Malan was named in Cape Town Blitz's squad for the first edition of the Mzansi Super League T20 tournament. Later the same month, he was named in the squad for the Khulna Titans team, following the draft for the 2018–19 Bangladesh Premier League. In November 2019, he was selected to play for the Comilla Victorians in the 2019–20 Bangladesh Premier League. In October 2020, he was drafted by the Jaffna Stallions for the inaugural edition of the Lanka Premier League.

In December 2020, Malan made his debut for the Australian Big Bash League, joining the Hobart Hurricanes.

In February 2021, Malan was bought by the Punjab Kings in the IPL auction ahead of the 2021 Indian Premier League. However, he only managed to play one match in the season.

Malan was drafted by Trent Rockets for the inaugural season of The Hundred. In April 2022, he was bought by the Trent Rockets for the 2022 season of The Hundred.
