= Paul Harrison (English cricketer) =

English cricketer

Personal information
- Full name: Paul William Harrison
- Born: 22 May 1984 (age 42); Cuckfield, Sussex
- Nickname: Harry, Potter
- Height: 6 ft 2 in (1.88 m)
- Batting: Right-handed
- Bowling: Right-arm medium
- Role: Batsman

Domestic team information
- Years: Team
- 2004–2006: Loughborough UCCE
- 2005: Warwickshire
- 2006–2007: Leicestershire
- 2009–: Northamptonshire

Career statistics
| Competition | FC | LA | T20 |
|---|---|---|---|
| Matches | 18 | 11 | 14 |
| Runs scored | 488 | 178 | 132 |
| Batting average | 21.21 | 17.80 | 11.00 |
| 100s/50s | 0/1 | 0/1 | 0/0 |
| Top score | 256* | 61 | 26 |
| Catches/stumpings | 23/2 | 7/– | 2/– |
- Source: CricketArchive, 20 July 2010

Paul William Harrison (born 22 May 1984) is an English cricketer who most recently played first-class cricket for Northamptonshire. He is a middle-order batsman who can also keep wicket.

== Career ==
Harrison was signed by Leicestershire in 2006 after impressing at Loughborough UCCE and graduating from the university in 2006. He has previously had spells at Sussex between 2002 and 2004, then Warwickshire in 2005. Harrison was released by Leicestershire at the end of the 2007 season. In 2008, he played Second XI cricket for Surrey and Worcestershire before joining Northamptonshire until the end of the season. He made his debut for Northamptonshire against one of his former trialist clubs, Surrey on 8 September. At the start of the 2010 season, Harrison was a first team regular and kept wicket due to Niall O'Brien being on international duty and David Murphy still at University.
