= Mark Powell (cricketer, born 1980) =

English cricketer (born 1980)

Personal information
- Full name: Mark John Powell
- Born: 4 November 1980 (age 46); Northampton, England
- Batting: Right-handed
- Bowling: Right-arm off spin
- Role: Batsman

Domestic team information
- Years: Team
- 2000–2004: Northamptonshire
- 2000–2002: Loughborough UCCE

Career statistics
Competition	First-class	List A
Matches	27	15
Runs scored	1,024	259
Batting average	24.97	21.58
100s/50s	2/4	0/2
Top score	108*	70
Balls bowled	12	–
Wickets	0	–
Bowling average	–	–
5 wickets in innings	–	–
10 wickets in match	–	–
Best bowling	–	–
Catches/stumpings	40/–	4/–
- Source: Cricinfo, 28 July 2009

Mark John Powell (born 4 November 1980) was an English professional cricketer for Northamptonshire from the years 2000 to 2004. Since then he has retired from professional cricket to take up a business career in London, England where he also continued to play club Cricket in the Middlesex Premier League for Finchley between 2006 and 2009. He was born at Northampton in 1980.

== Career ==
Mark Powell played a total of 42 matches for Northamptonshire in first-class and One day competitions, as well as appearances for the England Under-15 team in 1996 and the Loughborough UCCE in 2000 to 2002. His First Class high score of 108 not out in 2002 was achieved during a record-breaking first wicket partnership of 375, in which Rob White scored 277.
