= Chris Saunders =

Chris Saunders may refer to:

- Chris Saunders (headmaster) (born 1940), English former headmaster and first-class cricketer
- Chris Saunders (boxer) (born 1969), British former boxer, British welterweight champion between 1995 and 1996
- Chris Saunders (mixed martial artist) (born 1986), American fighter
- Chris Saunders, musician with Nigel Durham
- Chris Saunders, creator of Lola T95/30

== See also ==
- Chris Sanders (disambiguation)
