= Philip Hayes =

Philip Hayes may refer to:

- Philip Hayes (composer) (1738–1797), English organist and conductor
- Philip C. Hayes (1833–1916), U.S. Representative from Illinois
- Philip H. Hayes (1940–2023), U.S. Representative from Indiana
- Philip Maurice Hayes, British Canadian actor/voice actor
- Philip Hayes (United States Army officer) (1887–1949), U.S. Army general
- Phil Hayes (born 1986), English cricketer
- Phillip Hayes (Spiderman), fictional Spider-Man villain

== See also ==
- Phil Hay (disambiguation)
- Philip Hays (born 1930), American illustrator
- Philip Boucher-Hayes, head of RTÉ's Radio Investigative Unit
