= Nitesh =

- Gender: Male
- Language: Hindi; Bengali

Origin
- Region of origin: India

Nitesh is an Indian masculine given name.

- Nitesh Pandey (born 1973), Indian actor
- Nitesh Patel (born 1989), English cricketer
- Nitesh Narayan Rane (born 1982), Indian politician
- Nitesh Tiwari, Indian director

== See also ==
- Nitesh Hub, former shopping mall in Pune, India
