= Basil Akram =

English cricketer

Personal information
- Full name: Basil Mohammad Ramzan Akram
- Born: 23 February 1993 (age 33); Waltham Forest, Essex, England
- Batting: Right-handed
- Bowling: Right-arm fast-medium

Domestic team information
- Years: Team
- 2014–2017: Loughborough MCCU
- 2014: Hampshire (squad no. 46)

Career statistics
Competition	First-class	List A
Matches	6	1
Runs scored	348	1
Batting average	58.00	1.00
100s/50s	2/–	–/–
Top score	160	1
Balls bowled	680	12
Wickets	17	0
Bowling average	34.82	–
5 wickets in innings	1	–
10 wickets in match	–	–
Best bowling	5/54	–
Catches/stumpings	2/–	–/–
- Source: Cricinfo, 16 September 2014

Basil Mohammad Ramzan Akram (born 23 February 1993) is an English former first-class cricketer.

Akram was born at Waltham Forest in February 1993. He was educated at Brentwood School, before matriculating to Loughborough University. Having represented Essex at youth level, Akram made his debut in first-class cricket for Loughborough MCCU against Sussex at Hove in 2014, with him claiming the wicket of England Test cricketer Matt Prior. He made his second first-class appearance for Loughborough the following season, against Hampshire. In September 2014, Akram signed a development contract with Hampshire for the 2015 season. He would make just one senior appearance for Hampshire, playing in a List A one-day match against Yorkshire at the Rose Bowl in the 2014 Royal London One-Day Cup. In this match, he was dismissed for a single run by Adil Rashid and bowled two wicketless overs, conceding 24 runs. At the end of the 2015 season, Akram was one of three players (the others being Joe Gatting and Tom Barber) who were released by Hampshire as their contracts had expired.

Following his release by Hampshire, he continued to play for Loughborough MCCU, having a successful season in 2016. Against Surrey, he recorded his maiden first-class century with a score of 160, and followed this up with an unbeaten 100 against Kent, sharing in a 130 runs partnership for the 8th wicket with Sam Grant (52). He played his final season of first-class cricket for Loughborough in 2017, making two appearances against Leicestershire and Northamptonshire, taking his career best bowling figures of 5 for 54 against Leicestershire. In six first-class matches, Akram scored 348 runs at an average of exactly 58. With the ball, he took 17 wickets at a bowling average of 34.82. As of 2019, Akram was playing club cricket for Potterne Cricket Club in Wiltshire.
