= Simon Rose =

Simon Rose may refer to:

- Simon Rose (author) (born 1961), Canadian author of science fiction and fantasy novels for children and young adults
- Simon Rose (journalist) (born 1957), former BBC Radio researcher
- Simon Rose (cricketer) (born 1989), English cricketer
