= Alex Welsh =

Alex Welsh may refer to:

- Alex Welsh (musician)
- Alex Welsh (cricketer)
- Alex Welsh (curler)
- Alex Welsh (cyclist)

== See also ==
- Alexander Welsh, American philologist
