= Daniel Pratt =

Daniel Pratt may refer to:

- Daniel Pratt (industrialist) (1799–1873), Alabama industrialist
- Daniel D. Pratt (1813–1877), U.S. Senator from Indiana
- Daniel Pratt (eccentric) (1809–1887), American itinerant speaker, author, performance-artist, eccentric, and poet
- Daniel Pratt (footballer) (born 1983), Australian rules footballer
- Daniel Pratt (New York politician) (1806–1884), New York State Attorney General 1874–1875
- Daniel Pratt (cricketer) (born 1986), English cricketer
