= Michael Baer =

Welsh cricketer

Personal information
- Full name: Michael Baer
- Born: 31 March 1987 (age 39); Rhuddlan, Flintshire, Wales
- Batting: Left-handed
- Bowling: Slow left-arm orthodox

Domestic team information
- Years: Team
- 2008–2010: Cumberland
- 2008–2009: Loughborough UCCE

Career statistics
Competition	First-class
Matches	4
Runs scored	12
Batting average	12.00
100s/50s	–/–
Top score	8
Balls bowled	516
Wickets	3
Bowling average	110.00
5 wickets in innings	–
10 wickets in match	–
Best bowling	2/19
Catches/stumpings	–/–
- Source: Cricinfo, 26 March 2011

Michael Baer (born 31 March 1987), is a Welsh cricketer. Baer is a left-handed batsman who bowls slow left-arm orthodox. He was born in Rhuddlan, Flintshire and educated at Lancaster Royal Grammar School in Lancashire.

Baer made his first-class debut for Loughborough UCCE against Worcestershire in 2008 at the Chester Road North Ground, Kidderminster. He played a further three first-class fixtures in 2009, the last of which came against Hampshire. In his four first-class matches, he scored 12 runs at a batting average of 12.00, with high score of 8. With the ball he took 3 wickets at an expensive bowling average of 110.00. His best bowling figures of 2/19 came against Leicestershire in 2009 and included the wickets of Wayne White and Nathan Buck. His other first-class wicket came against Hampshire and was that of James Vince.

Baer joined Cumberland in 2008, making his Minor Counties Championship debut against Hertfordshire. He made two further appearances in 2010 against Norfolk and Lincolnshire. He has played Second XI cricket for both the Lancashire Second XI and Middlesex Second XI.
