= Gavin Baker =

English cricketer (born 1988)

Personal information
- Full name: Gavin Charles Baker
- Born: 3 October 1988 (age 38); Edgware, Middlesex, England
- Batting: Right-handed
- Bowling: Right-arm fast-medium
- Role: All-rounder

Domestic team information
- Years: Team
- 2009–2010: Loughborough MCCU
- 2010–2011: Northamptonshire

Career statistics
Competition	First-class	List A
Matches	9	1
Runs scored	354	0
Batting average	29.50	0.00
100s/50s	0/3	0/0
Top score	66	0
Balls bowled	1,011	42
Wickets	8	1
Bowling average	100.62	63.00
5 wickets in innings	0	0
10 wickets in match	0	0
Best bowling	2/35	1/63
Catches/stumpings	1/–	0/–
- Source: Cricinfo, 18 April 2011

Gavin Charles Baker (born 3 October 1988) is an English professional cricket player currently playing for Northamptonshire County Cricket Club after playing for his University, Loughborough MCCU. He is predominantly a right arm medium fast bowler who can also bat. He was born at Edgware in London in 1988.

== Career ==
Baker signed a professional deal with Northamptonshire at the end of the 2010 season, after impressing the coaching staff with solid performances in the 2nd XI. He made his first team debut in an LV= County Championship match against Derbyshire in August last season. The right arm seamer was picked up after playing against Northants for Loughborough University.
