= Liam Lewis =

English cricketer (born 1986)

Personal information
- Full name: Liam James Lewis
- Born: 23 October 1986 (age 40); Exeter, Devon, England
- Batting: Right-handed

Domestic team information
- Years: Team
- 2011: Devon
- 2007: Loughborough UCCE

Career statistics
Competition	First-class
Matches	2
Runs scored	26
Batting average	6.50
100s/50s	–/–
Top score	21
Balls bowled	–
Wickets	–
Bowling average	–
5 wickets in innings	–
10 wickets in match	–
Best bowling	–
Catches/stumpings	1/–
- Source: Cricinfo, 16 August 2011

Liam James Lewis (born 23 October 1986) is an English cricketer. Lewis is a right-handed batsman. He was born in Exeter, Devon.

While studying for his degree at Loughborough University, Lewis made his first-class debut for Loughborough UCCE against Somerset in 2007. He made a further first-class appearance for the team in 2007, against Worcestershire. In his two first-class matches, he scored 26 runs at an average of 6.50, with a high score of 21.

Lewis later played for Devon in the 2011 season, so far making just a single appearance in the Minor Counties Championship against Cheshire.
