= Alan Cope =

English cricketer (born 1988)

Personal information
- Full name: Alan Charles Cope
- Born: 17 July 1988 (age 38); Guildford, Surrey, England
- Nickname: Copey
- Height: 6 ft 1 in (1.85 m)
- Batting: Right-handed
- Bowling: Right-arm medium

Domestic team information
- Years: Team
- 2010: Loughborough MCCU
- 2008: Loughborough UCCE

Career statistics
Competition	First-class
Matches	3
Runs scored	84
Batting average	16.80
100s/50s	–/1
Top score	51
Balls bowled	24
Wickets	–
Bowling average	–
5 wickets in innings	–
10 wickets in match	–
Best bowling	–
Catches/stumpings	–/–
- Source: Cricinfo, 16 August 2011

Alan Charles Cope (born 17 July 1988) is an English cricketer. Cope is a right-handed batsman who bowls right-arm medium pace. He was born in Guildford, Surrey and was educated at Cranleigh School.

While studying for his degree at Loughborough University, Cope made his first-class debut for Loughborough UCCE against Warwickshire in 2008. Injuries hampered Cope, with him missing the entire 2009 season. Returning from injury for the 2010 season, he was named captain of Loughborough MCCU (as it was now called following a renaming). He made two further first-class appearances in 2010, against Kent and Yorkshire. In his three first-class matches, he scored 84 runs at an average of 16.80, with a high score of 51.
