= Oli Soames =

English cricketer

Personal information
- Full name: Oliver Courtenay Soames
- Born: 27 October 1995 (age 31); Kingston upon Thames, Surrey, England
- Batting: Right-handed
- Bowling: Right-arm medium

Domestic team information
- Years: Team
- 2018: Loughborough MCCU
- 2018–2020: Hampshire (squad no. 27)
- 2021–2022: Dorset
- 2023–present: Bedfordshire

Career statistics
Competition	First-class
Matches	12
Runs scored	238
Batting average	11.90
100s/50s	–/1
Top score	62
Catches/stumpings	3/–
- Source: Cricinfo, 8 July 2019

Oliver Courtenay Soames (born 27 October 1995) is an English cricketer.

Soames was born at Kingston upon Thames in October 1995. He was educated at Cheltenham College, where he captained the cricket eleven in 2014. From there, he matriculated to Loughborough University. Whilst studying at Loughborough, Soames wished to play top-level cricket for Loughborough MCCU. Though he was unsuccessful with getting into their team in his first year, he did play club cricket for Kegworth Town Cricket Club in 2015, where his performances saw him selected for Loughborough MCCU's winter squad. He later broke into the Loughborough eleven in 2018, making two first-class appearances against Sussex at Hove, and Lancashire at Loughborough. Having been a member of the Hampshire academy, Soames also made his debut for Hampshire in the 2018 County Championship, against Worcestershire. Following the retirement of James Adams at the end of the 2018 season, Soames filled his vacant position at the top of the order. However, except for a half century he made against Nottinghamshire, Soames struggled for consistency in the six first-class matches he played in 2019, leading to him losing his place in the Hampshire side. In total, Soames made ten first-class appearances for Hampshire, scoring 217 runs at an average of 12.05. He was released by Hampshire following the end of the 2020 season, alongside teammate Harry Came.

Following his release by Hampshire, Soames joined Dorset in 2021, playing national counties cricket for them until 2022. He made seven appearances in the National Counties Championship, ten appearances in the NCCA Knockout Trophy, and a single appearance in the National Counties T20. In the winter of 2021, Soames played club cricket in South Africa for Brackenfell Cricket Club in Brackenfell, near Cape Town. In 2023, he began playing national counties cricket for Bedfordshire. Running concurrently to his national counties cricket with Bedfordshire, Soames is also director of cricket at Guildford Cricket Club.
