= Adam King (cricketer) =

English cricketer (born 1999)

Personal information
- Full name: Adam Edward King
- Born: 14 September 1999 (age 27); Aylesbury, Buckinghamshire, England
- Batting: Left-handed
- Role: Wicket-keeper

Domestic team information
- Years: Team
- 2019: Loughborough MCCU

Career statistics
Competition	First-class
Matches	2
Runs scored	53
Batting average	17.66
100s/50s	–/–
Top score	33
Catches/stumpings	2/–
- Source: Cricinfo, 7 August 2020

Adam Edward King (born 14 September 1999) is an English former first-class cricketer.

King was born at Aylesbury in September 1999. He was educated at Stowe School, before going up to Loughborough University. While studying at Loughborough, he played two first-class cricket matches for Loughborough MCCU against Leicestershire and Kent in 2019. Playing as a wicket-keeper, he scored 53 runs in his two matches with a high score of 33. King is also a member of the Northamptonshire academy and has represented the county at second eleven level.
