= Olchfa School =

Secondary school in Swansea, Wales

Location
- Gower Road; Swansea, City and County of Swansea, SA2 7AB; Wales

Information
- Type: Secondary School
- Motto: Dysg, Dawn, Daioni (Learning, Talent, Goodness)
- Opened: 3 September 1969
- Local authority: Swansea
- Headmaster: Julian Kennedy (2023–Present)
- Age: 11 to 19
- Enrolment: 1,907
- Colours: Blue and red
- Website: Official website

Olchfa School (Welsh: Ysgol Gyfun yr Olchfa) is the largest secondary school in Swansea, South Wales, with approximately 1,900 pupils, including a sixth form of over 400 students. Situated in Sketty Park to the west of Sketty, it provides secondary education for GCSE and A-Level qualifications. In 2024, it was named one of the top 100 state secondary schools in the UK. Olchfa (part of the Sketty Swansea suburb) means 'washing place' in the English language.

Around 4.5% of pupils have a special educational need and 1.7% have a statement of special educational needs. Both of these figures are below the Welsh averages of 21.1% and 11.2% respectively. Nearly a quarter of pupils come from an ethnic minority background, 3.8% speak English as an additional language and 0.8% speak Welsh at home.

The headteacher is Julian Kennedy, who has been in post since 2023. The Welsh Government has selected the school as a Pioneer School to participate in the development of its curriculum.

== Academic performance ==
In its most recent Estyn inspection in 2018, Olchfa School received the highest possible judgement, 'Excellent' in all five inspection areas. In the same year, the school reported a GCSE pass rate of 85% (based on 5 GCSEs at grades A*-C), placing it among the top five schools in Wales, and top three for the percentage of A*-A grades. It ranked 74th in the UK in 2018, based on combined A-level (A*-B) and GCSE (A*-C) performance. In 2023, 33.7% of A-level results at Olchfa were awarded A*-A grades. The school was named the second-best state secondary in Wales by the Sunday Times Parent Power Guide in 2023, 2024 and 2025. In its September 2025 inspection, Estyn reported that Olchfa School provided a nurturing and inclusive environment with pupils making secure progress, but recommended the school share good teaching practices and strengthen how leaders monitor teaching and pupil progress.

== Facilities ==
The school consists of several sections — the main building, a south block, two purpose-built assembly halls, and a professionally equipped Theatre Hall that also serves as a third assembly venue when required. Additional facilities include a P.E. department with multiple indoor sports halls, a dedicated maths and science block, an on-site swimming pool, and a range of outdoor pitches for Tennis, Rugby, Football, Netball, Basketball and Cricket. A £1.6 million investment is currently underway to develop a full-size, all-weather 3G pitch. There is also an on-site specialist facility supporting the needs of hearing-impaired pupils.

== Notable former pupils ==
Sports

- Daniel Alfei, Welsh U21 International and former Swansea City footballer.
- Matthew Benjamin, Commonwealth Games squash player
- Simon Davey, former Swansea City footballer and football manager
- Robert Folland, Football Player
- Janet Gedrych – Great Britain and Wales international rugby union player and United Rugby Championship disciplinary panel member
- Aaron Lewis, Welsh U21 International and Mansfield Town footballer
- Mark Harris, Welsh International and Oxford United footballer
- Keston Davies, Welsh U21 International and former Notts County and Yeovil Town footballer.
- David Hemp, Bermudan International Cricketer
- Charles Lowen, English International Cricketer
- Richie Rees, Rugby Player
- Ellie Simmonds OBE, Paralympian Gold Medalist Swimmer
- Mingge Xu, Welsh tennis player

Arts and Entertainment

- Russell T Davies, screenwriter and television producer
- Joe Dunthorne, poet and author
- Liz Fuller, actress, model and beauty pageant titleholder
- Stephen Harris, rock musician with stage name "Kid Chaos"
- Georgia Henshaw, Actress
- Andrew Jones, film producer

Law, Academia and Public Service

- Richard Barrett, Composer
- Sir Andrew Dilnot, Economist
- Nerys Jefford, High Court judge
- Heather Nicholson, animal rights activist
- Jennifer Rodd, Professor of Cognitive Psychology

List of Headteachers

- John Curtis Grove; 1969 - tbd
- John Booth; tbd- 1994
- Trevor Church; 1995 - 2001
- Hugh Davies; 2001 - 2023
- Julian Kennedy; 2023–present
