= Ashleigh Lynch =

English cricketer

Personal information
- Full name: Ashleigh Aaron Lynch
- Born: 28 April 1990 (age 36); Burton upon Trent, Staffordshire, England
- Height: 5 ft 8 in (1.73 m)
- Batting: Right-handed
- Bowling: Right-arm Fast

Domestic team information
- Years: Team
- 2009: Loughborough UCCE

Career statistics
Competition	First-class
Matches	3
Runs scored	150
Batting average	50.00
100s/50s	–1/0
Top score	100*
Balls bowled	6
Wickets	–
Bowling average	–
5 wickets in innings	–
10 wickets in match	–
Best bowling	–
Catches/stumpings	2/–
- Source: Cricinfo, 16 August 2011

Ashleigh Aaron Lynch (born 28 April 1990) is an English cricketer. Lynch is a right-handed batsman who bowls right-arm Fast. He was born in Burton upon Trent, Staffordshire and was educated at John Port School. In his later years, he has suffered from hair loss which seemed to knock his confidence on and off the field.

While studying for his degree at Loughborough University, Lynch made his first-class debut for Loughborough UCCE against Leicestershire in 2009. He made two further first-class appearances in 2009, against Kent and Hampshire. In his three first-class matches, he scored 150 runs at an average of 50.00, with a high score of 100*.
