= Henry Jones (cricketer) =

English cricketer (born 1989)

Personal information
- Full name: Henry David Jones
- Born: 8 March 1989 (age 37); Kingston-upon-Thames, Greater London, England
- Height: 6 ft 7 in (2.01 m)
- Batting: Right-handed
- Bowling: Right-arm medium

Domestic team information
- Years: Team
- 2008–2009: Loughborough UCCE

Career statistics
| Competition | First-class |
|---|---|
| Matches | 5 |
| Runs scored | 8 |
| Batting average | 2.66 |
| 100s/50s | –/– |
| Top score | 6* |
| Balls bowled | 546 |
| Wickets | 6 |
| Bowling average | 57.33 |
| 5 wickets in innings | – |
| 10 wickets in match | – |
| Best bowling | 4/57 |
| Catches/stumpings | 1/– |
- Source: Cricinfo, 16 August 2011

Henry David Jones (born 8 March 1989) is an English cricketer. Jones is a right-handed batsman who bowls right-arm medium pace. He was born in Kingston-upon-Thames, Greater London and was educated at Caterham School.

While studying for his degree at Loughborough University, Jones made his first-class debut for Loughborough UCCE against Gloucestershire in 2008. He made four further appearances for the team, the last of which came against Hampshire in 2009. In his five first-class matches, Jones scored 8 runs at an average of 2.66, with a high score of 6 not out. With the ball, he took 6 wickets at a bowling average of 57.33, with best figures of 4/57.
