= Charl Malan =

English cricketer

Chad Malan
Personal information
- Full name: Charl Christiaan Malan
- Born: 23 February 1989 (age 37); Wandsworth, London
- Height: 6 ft 0 in (1.83 m)
- Batting: Right-handed
- Bowling: Right-arm off break
- Relatives: Dawid Malan Snr (father); Dawid Malan Jnr (brother)

Domestic team information
- Years: Team
- 2010: Loughborough MCCU
- 2009: Loughborough UCCE

Career statistics
| Competition | First-class |
|---|---|
| Matches | 4 |
| Runs scored | 43 |
| Batting average | 10.75 |
| 100s/50s | 0/0 |
| Top score | 24 |
| Balls bowled | 402 |
| Wickets | 4 |
| Bowling average | 44.50 |
| 5 wickets in innings | 0 |
| 10 wickets in match | 0 |
| Best bowling | 1/28 |
| Catches/stumpings | 0/– |
- Source: Cricinfo, 16 August 2011

Charl Christiaan Malan (born 23 February 1989) is a former English cricketer. Malan is a right-handed batsman who bowls right-arm off break. He was born in Wandsworth in London but was educated at Paarl Boys' High School in South Africa.

While studying for his degree at Loughborough University in England, Malan made his first-class cricket debut for Loughborough UCCE against Leicestershire in 2010. He made two further appearances for the team in 2010, against Kent and Hampshire. The following season he played one match for the team, this time called Loughborough MCCU following a name change, against Yorkshire.

His father, Dawid Malan Snr, played first-class cricket in South Africa for Western Province and Northern Transvaal, whilst his brother, Dawid Malan Jnr plays first-class cricket for Yorkshire and the England national team.
