= Chris Sanders (disambiguation) =

Chris Sanders (born 1962) is an American filmmaker, animator, and voice actor.

Chris Sanders may also refer to:

- Chris Sanders (quarterback) (born 1977), quarterback for the Dallas Desperados
- Chris Sanders (running back) (born 1973), running back for Washington Redskins
- Chris Sanders (wide receiver) (born 1972), wide receiver for the Houston Oilers/Tennessee Titans
- Chris Sanders (cricketer) (born 1998), English cricketer
- C. J. Sanders (born 1996), American football wide receiver for the Notre Dame Fighting Irish
