= Adam Soilleux =

English cricketer

Personal information
- Full name: Adam Charles Soilleux
- Born: 29 November 1991 (age 34); Southend-on-Sea, Essex, England
- Nickname: Churchill, Adza
- Batting: Right-handed
- Bowling: Right-arm medium-fast

Domestic team information
- Years: Team
- 2011: Loughborough MCCU

Career statistics
Competition	First-class
Matches	1
Runs scored	9
Batting average	4.50
100s/50s	–/–
Top score	6
Balls bowled	102
Wickets	2
Bowling average	28.00
5 wickets in innings	–
10 wickets in match	–
Best bowling	2/56
Catches/stumpings	–/–
- Source: Cricinfo, 16 August 2011

Adam Charles Soilleux (born 29 November 1991) is an English cricketer. Soilleux is a right-handed batsman who bowls right-arm medium-fast. He was born in Southend-on-Sea, Essex.

While studying for his degree in Banking Finance and Management at Loughborough University, Soilleux made his first-class debut for Loughborough MCCU against Northamptonshire in 2011. In this match, he was dismissed for three runs in Loughborough's first-innings by David Lucas, while in their second-innings he scored six runs, before being dismissed by Lee Daggett. With the ball, he took the wickets of Niall O'Brien and Alex Wakely in Northamptonshire's first and only innings, in what was a drawn match. This remains his only first-class appearance.
