= Tom Parsons (cricketer) =

English cricketer (born 1987)

Personal information
- Full name: Thomas William Parsons
- Born: 2 May 1987 (age 39); Melbourne, Victoria, Australia
- Height: 6 ft 3 in (1.91 m)
- Batting: Right-handed
- Bowling: Right arm fast-medium

Domestic team information
- Years: Team
- 2007–2008: Loughborough UCCE
- 2007: Kent
- 2009–2011: Hampshire (squad no. 11)
- 2011: Berkshire
- 2011: Middlesex

Career statistics
Competition	First-class	List A
Matches	7	1
Runs scored	31	–
Batting average	6.20	–
100s/50s	0/0	–
Top score	12	–
Balls bowled	833	36
Wickets	11	2
Bowling average	41.63	20.50
5 wickets in innings	0	0
10 wickets in match	0	0
Best bowling	3/39	2/41
Catches/stumpings	0/–	0/–
- Source: Cricinfo, 30 January 2016

Thomas William Parsons (born 2 May 1987) is an Australian-born English former professional cricketer who played as a bowler for Kent, Hampshire, and Middlesex in county cricket, and for Loughborough UCCE in varsity cricket.

== Cricket career ==
Parsons was born at Melbourne in Australia and educated at Maidstone Grammar School in Kent and at Loughborough University. While studying at Loughborough, Parsons made his debut in first-class cricket for Loughborough UCCE against Worcestershire at Worcester in 2007, with him playing a second match in the same season against Yorkshire. Later in that same season, Parsons played a single List A one-day match for Kent in a rain-affected match against Sri Lanka A at Canterbury, with Parsons taking figures of 2 for 42 in the match. In 2008, he made three further first-class appearances for Loughborough UCCE against Surrey, Gloucestershire, and Worcestershire.

After graduating from Loughborough in 2008, Parsons signed a professional contract for Hampshire ahead of the 2009 season, during which he played one first-class match against Loughborough UCCE. Following the 2009 season, Parsons signed a one-year contract extension with Hampshire, alongside Benny Howell, Chris Morgan, Hamza Riazuddin, and James Vince. However, having not appeared for the first eleven in 2009 due to injury sustained playing for Rockingham Mandurah in Western Australia Premier Cricket, Parsons was released alongside Tom Burrows and Chris Morgan. Following his release by Hampshire, he played minor counties cricket for Berkshire in 2010 and 2011, making six appearances in the Minor Counties Championship and two in the MCCA Knockout Trophy. In 2011, he returned to first-class cricket when he played for Middlesex against Sri Lanka A. In the seven first-class matches in which he appeared, he took 11 wickets with his right-arm fast-medium bowling, at an average of 41.63. Away from county cricket, he played club cricket for Kent Cricket League (KCL) for The Mote and Sevenoaks Vine, playing alongside Zak Crawley and Steve Smith for the latter, whom he captained to the KCL title in 2014. He later joined Leeds Cricket Club in Kent.

After his first-class career came to an end in 2011, Parsons began working for a company run by former Hampshire cricketer Jono McLean as its social media manager. After the company failed, he and McLean established their own company, Wildfire, which promoted brands across the world. He is currently Head of Marketing at Six Nations Rugby.
