= Nick Clewley =

English cricketer (born 1983)

Personal information
- Full name: Nicholas James Clewley
- Born: 13 June 1983 (age 43); Wolverhampton, Staffordshire, England
- Batting: Right-handed
- Bowling: Right-arm fast-medium

Domestic team information
- Years: Team
- 2005: Loughborough UCCE
- 2004–2006: Shropshire

Career statistics
Competition	First-class
Matches	2
Runs scored	3
Batting average	–
100s/50s	–/–
Top score	2*
Balls bowled	444
Wickets	3
Bowling average	85.66
5 wickets in innings	–
10 wickets in match	–
Best bowling	2/132
Catches/stumpings	1/–
- Source: Cricinfo, 17 August 2011

Nicholas James Clewley (born 13 June 1983) is an English cricketer. Clewley is a right-handed batsman who bowls right-arm fast-medium. He was born in Wolverhampton, Staffordshire.

Clewley made his debut for Shropshire against Oxfordshire in the 2004 Minor Counties Championship. He played Minor counties cricket for Shropshire from 2004 to 2006, making six appearances in the Minor Counties Championship and three MCCA Knockout Trophy appearances.

While studying for his degree at Loughborough University, Clewley made his first-class debut for Loughborough UCCE against Sussex in 2005. He made a further first-class appearance for the team in 2005, against Nottinghamshire. In his two first-class matches, he scored 3 runs with a high score of 2 not out. With the ball, he took 3 wickets at an average of 85.66, with best figures of 2/132.
