= Jack Cornick =

Bermudian cricketer (born 1992)

Personal information
- Full name: Jack Paris Pattison Cornick
- Born: 24 November 1992 (age 33); Nottingham, Nottinghamshire, England
- Batting: Right-handed
- Role: Wicket-keeper

Domestic team information
- Years: Team
- 2013: Loughborough MCCU

Career statistics
Competition	First-class
Matches	2
Runs scored	11
Batting average	3.66
100s/50s	–/–
Top score	10
Catches/stumpings	1/–
- Source: Cricinfo, 6 August 2020

Jack Paris Pattison Cornick (born 24 November 1992) is an English former first-class cricketer.

Cornick was born at Nottingham in November 1992. He was educated at King Edward's School, Birmingham before going up to Loughborough University. While studying at Loughborough, he made two appearances in first-class cricket for Loughborough MCCU against Sussex and Hampshire in 2013. He struggled as a batsman against first-class county opposition, scoring just 11 runs with a high score of 10.
