= Anish Patel =

English cricketer (born 1990)

Personal information
- Full name: Anish Kirtesh Patel
- Born: 26 May 1990 (age 36); Manchester, Lancashire, England
- Batting: Right-handed
- Bowling: Right-arm off break

Domestic team information
- Years: Team
- 2013–2015: Loughborough MCCU
- 2013–2016: Lincolnshire

Career statistics
Competition	First-class
Matches	6
Runs scored	218
Batting average	24.22
100s/50s	–/1
Top score	83
Catches/stumpings	1/–
- Source: Cricinfo, 16 February 2019

Anish Kirtesh Patel (born 26 May 1990) is an English former first-class cricketer.

Patel was born at Manchester and attended Loughborough University. While at Loughborough he made his debut in first-class cricket for Loughborough MCCU against Sussex at Hove in 2013. He played first-class cricket for Loughborough until 2015, having made six appearances. Across his six first-class matches, he scored 218 runs at an average of 24.22, with a high score of 83.

Patel played minor counties cricket for Lincolnshire, debuting against Norfolk in the 2013 Minor Counties Championship. He played minor counties cricket for Lincolnshire until 2016, making a total of seven appearances in the Minor Counties Championship, six in the minor counties one-day competition, as well as one match in the minor counties 20-over competition.

He captained England at the 2017 Indoor Cricket World Cup; his sister captained the women's team at the same competition. He runs a sports centre for indoor cricket in Birmingham. He is a distant cousin of the former New Zealand spin bowler Dipak Patel.
