= Zoheb Sharif =

English cricketer

Personal information
- Full name: Zoheb Khalid Sharif
- Born: 22 February 1983 (age 43); Leytonstone, Essex, England
- Batting: Left-handed
- Bowling: Leg break

Domestic team information
- Years: Team
- 2001–2003: Essex
- 2003: Loughborough MCCU
- 2005–2007: Cambridge MCCU
- 2007: Marylebone Cricket Club

Career statistics
Competition	First-class
Matches	15
Runs scored	771
Batting average	40.57
100s/50s	2/4
Top score	140*
Balls bowled	1,278
Wickets	15
Bowling average	62.86
5 wickets in innings	–
10 wickets in match	–
Best bowling	4/98
Catches/stumpings	4/–
- Source: Cricinfo, 17 June 2022

Zoheb Khalid Sharif (born 22 February 1983) is an English cricketer. He is a left-handed batsman and a leg spin bowler. He played first-class cricket for Essex, Loughborough UCCE, Cambridge UCCE and the MCC.

Sharif was born in Leytonstone, Essex. He made his debut for Essex Second XI in July 2000, and made his first-class debut in the County Championship in September the following season, against Yorkshire. He was a regular Second XI player for Essex until he was released following the 2004 season, during which he scored 811 runs at an average of over 100; he was subsequently named Les Hatton Second Eleven Player of the Season. While at Essex, he also played in three further County Championship matches, two in 2002, and one in 2003. In early 2003, he also played three first-class matches for Loughborough UCCE.

After leaving Essex, Sharif continued to play second XI county cricket, firstly for Derbyshire in 2005, then for Surrey and Sussex in 2006, before re-joining Essex in 2007, where he was again a second XI regular. Between 2005 and 2007 Sharif also played six first-class matches for Cambridge UCCE; he also played two first-class matches for MCC in 2007. In 2010, he was named in the Unicorns squad for the Clydesdale Bank 40; he appeared in two warm-up matches but did not play in the competition itself.
