= Ryan Cummins =

English cricketer (born 1984)

Personal information
- Full name: Ryan Anthony Gilbert Cummins
- Born: 14 April 1984 (age 42); Sutton, England
- Height: 6 ft 4 in (1.93 m)
- Batting: Right-handed
- Bowling: Right-arm medium
- Role: Bowler
- Relatives: Rob White (brother-in-law)

Domestic team information
- Years: Team
- 2003–2005: Loughborough UCCE
- 2005–2008: Leicestershire
- 2009: Northamptonshire

Career statistics
Competition	FC	LA	T20
Matches	22	24	1
Runs scored	221	36	–
Batting average	13.81	9.00	–
100s/50s	0/0	0/0	–
Top score	34*	12*	–
Balls bowled	3,526	941	40
Wickets	49	30	0
Bowling average	44.57	25.86	–
5 wickets in innings	1	0	–
10 wickets in match	0	0	–
Best bowling	5/60	3/21	–
Catches/stumpings	7/–	6/–	1/–
- Source: CricInfo, 28 April 2009

Ryan Anthony Gilbert Cummins (born 14 April 1984) is an English former cricketer, who represented Leicestershire County Cricket Club. He was born in Sutton, London.

Ryan's junior cricket was played at Beddington Cricket Club where he played at all levels. He also played in junior age groups for Surrey County Cricket Club and for his high school (Wallington County Grammar School).

Cummins was a right-arm fast bowler who joined Leicestershire from Loughborough UCCE. He made his County Championship debut against Essex in 2005, taking figures of 3/49 including Andy Flower as his maiden Championship wicket. Cummins was a surprise selection for Leicestershire in the final of the 2006 Twenty20 Cup replacing Adam Griffith who had played in the semi-final. On his Twenty20 debut, Cummins bowled three overs for 40 runs but took a fine catch at deep square-leg as Leicestershire won the title. His career best figures of 5/60 were taken against Northamptonshire at Grace Road in 2007.

With injury issues, he struggled to hold down a place in the Leicestershire team and was released at the end of the 2008 season. He joined Northamptonshire in the winter of 2008 but a back injury restricted his appearances and he was released at the end of following season.
