= Will MacVicar =

English cricketer

Personal information
- Full name: William Angus MacVicar
- Born: 16 January 1992 (age 34); Lambeth, London, England
- Batting: Right-handed
- Bowling: Right-arm medium

Domestic team information
- Years: Team
- 2013–2014: Loughborough MCCU

Career statistics
Competition	First-class
Matches	4
Runs scored	188
Batting average	31.33
100s/50s	–/1
Top score	79
Balls bowled	390
Wickets	3
Bowling average	77.00
5 wickets in innings	–
10 wickets in match	–
Best bowling	2/46
Catches/stumpings	3/–
- Source: Cricinfo, 6 August 2020

William Angus MacVicar (born 16 January 1992) is an English former first-class cricketer.

MacVicar was born at Lambeth in January 1992. He was educated at Dulwich College, before going up to Loughborough University. While studying at Loughborough, he made four appearances in first-class cricket for Loughborough MCCU, making two appearances each in 2013 and 2014. He scored 188 runs in his four matches at an average of 31.33, with a high score of 79 which came against Kent in 2014. With his right-arm medium pace bowling he took 3 wickets with best figures of 2 for 46. MacVicar has consistently played second eleven cricket for Kent since 2012, but is yet to feature for the first eleven.
