= Charles Lowen =

English cricketer

Personal information
- Full name: Charles Timothy Lowen
- Born: 12 September 1992 (age 34); Enfield, London, England
- Batting: Right-handed
- Role: Wicket-keeper

Domestic team information
- Years: Team
- 2012–2013: Wales Minor Counties
- 2015: Herefordshire
- 2016: Loughborough MCCU

Career statistics
Competition	First-class
Matches	2
Runs scored	121
Batting average	60.50
100s/50s	–/2
Top score	66
Catches/stumpings	2/2
- Source: Cricinfo, 6 August 2020

Charles Timothy Lowen (born 12 September 1992) is an English former first-class cricketer.

Lowen was born at Enfield in September 1992. He moved to Wales as a child, where he was educated in Swansea at both Olchfa School and Gower College. From there he went up to Loughborough University, where he played two first-class cricket matches for Loughborough MCCU against Surrey and Kent in 2016. Playing as a wicket-keeper, he scored 121 runs in his two matches, recording two half centuries and a high score of 66. Behind the stumps he took two catches and stumpings. In addition to playing first-class cricket, Lowen has also played minor counties cricket for Wales Minor Counties and Herefordshire.
