= Vikram Atri =

English cricketer

Personal information
- Full name: Vikram Atri
- Born: 9 March 1983 (age 43); Hull, Yorkshire, England
- Batting: Right-handed
- Bowling: Right-arm off break

Domestic team information
- Years: Team
- 2001: Nottinghamshire Cricket Board
- 2002–2003: Nottinghamshire
- 2002–2005: Loughborough UCEE
- 2004–2013: Lincolnshire

Career statistics
| Competition | First-class | List A |
|---|---|---|
| Matches | 12 | 1 |
| Runs scored | 548 | 0 |
| Batting average | 28.84 | 0.00 |
| 100s/50s | 0/4 | 0/0 |
| Top score | 98 | 0 |
| Balls bowled | 6 | – |
| Wickets | 0 | – |
| Bowling average | – | – |
| 5 wickets in innings | – | – |
| 10 wickets in match | – | – |
| Best bowling | – | – |
| Catches/stumpings | 8/– | 0/– |
- Source: Cricinfo, 28 September 2010

Vikram Atri (born 9 March 1983) is an English first-class cricketer. Atri is a right-handed batsman who bowls right-arm off break. He was born at Hull, Yorkshire.

Atri made his only appearance in List A cricket for the Nottinghamshire Cricket Board against Bedfordshire in the 2001 Cheltenham & Gloucester Trophy at Wardown Park, Luton, with the Board losing by 3 wickets. In his only List-A match he was dismissed for a duck.

Atri made his first-class debut for Nottinghamshire against West Indies A in 2002, and, batting as an opener, made a score of 98 against bowling that included past and future Test players Marlon Black and Tino Best. Wisden Cricketers' Almanack reported that "the calm and compact Vikram Atri caught the eye, before he trudged off dejectedly, two shy of a century in his maiden first-class knock". Atri's innings was characterised as "patient" and "dogged" in another report, which noted, however, nine "graceful" boundaries on the first day alone, when rain curtailed play. In the event, Atri played only two further first-class matches for Nottinghamshire, both of them in the 2003 County Championship against Middlesex and Kent. In 2003, he made his first-class debut for Loughborough UCCE against Somerset and from 2003 to 2005, he represented Loughborough UCCE in nine first-class matches, the last of which came against Worcestershire. In his combined total of 12 first-class matches, he scored 548 runs at a batting average of 28.84, with four half centuries, although he never surpassed his 98 on debut. In the field he took 8 catches.

In 2004, Atri made his Minor Counties Championship debut for Lincolnshire against Norfolk. He played for Lincolnshire until 2013.
