= Oliver Wilkin =

English cricketer (born 1992)

Oli Wilkin
Personal information
- Full name: Oliver Wilkin
- Born: 6 April 1992 (age 34); Ealing, London, England
- Batting: Right-handed
- Bowling: Right-arm medium

Domestic team information
- Years: Team
- 2011: Loughborough MCCU
- 2012–2014: Middlesex (squad no. 30)
- FC debut: 2 April 2011 Loughborough MCCU v Northamptonshire
- Only LA: 26 August 2013 Middlesex v Surrey

Career statistics
Competition	FC	LA	T20
Matches	3	1	3
Runs scored	138	20	38
Batting average	23.00	20.00	19.00
100s/50s	0/0	0/0	0/0
Top score	38	20	28
Balls bowled	300	48	24
Wickets	4	2	4
Bowling average	53.25	22.00	5.00
5 wickets in innings	0	0	0
10 wickets in match	0	0	0
Best bowling	2/63	2/44	3/12
Catches/stumpings	1/–	1/–	4/–
- Source: CricketArchive, 7 January 2014

Oliver Wilkin (born 6 April 1992) is an English cricketer. Wilkin is a right-handed batsman who also keeps wicket. He was born in Ealing, London and known for rarely leaving W5, W13

While studying for his degree in Materials Engineering at Loughborough University, Wilkin made his first-class debut for Loughborough MCCU against Northamptonshire in 2011. He has made two further first-class appearances for Loughborough MCCU in 2011, against Leicestershire and Kent. His three first-class appearances have so far seen him score 138 runs at an average of 23.00, with a high score of 38. With the ball, he has taken 4 wickets at a bowling average of 53.25, with best figures of 2/63.
