= Ian Prowse (cricketer) =

Irish cricketer

Personal information
- Full name: Ian Prowse
- Born: 31 January 1991 (age 35); Lisburn, Northern Ireland
- Batting: Right-handed
- Bowling: Right-arm medium Right-arm off break

Domestic team information
- Years: Team
- 2015: Loughborough MCCU

Career statistics
Competition	First-class
Matches	2
Runs scored	23
Batting average	11.50
100s/50s	–/–
Top score	15
Balls bowled	186
Wickets	2
Bowling average	60.50
5 wickets in innings	–
10 wickets in match	–
Best bowling	1/12
Catches/stumpings	–/–
- Source: Cricinfo, 6 August 2020

Ian Prowse (born 31 January 1991) is an Irish former first-class cricketer.

Prowse was born in Northern Ireland at Lisburn in January 1991. He was educated in England at Hampton School, before going up to Loughborough University. While studying at Loughborough, he made two appearances in first-class cricket for Loughborough MCCU against Hampshire and Nottinghamshire in 2015. He scored 23 runs in his two matches, with a high score of 15, in addition to taking 2 wickets with his mixture of right-arm medium pace and off break bowling.
