= Jennifer Rodd =

British psychologist and professor

Jennifer Mary Rodd
- Education: University of Cambridge; University of Edinburgh
- Scientific career
- Workplaces: University College London; University of Cambridge
- Thesis: Semantic representation and lexical competition : evidence from ambiguity (2001)

Jennifer Mary Rodd is a British psychologist who is Professor of Cognitive Psychology at University College London. Her research investigates how people learn and process words and their meanings.

== Early life and education ==
Rodd completed her secondary education at Olchfa School in Swansea. She then studied natural sciences at the University of Cambridge. She moved to the University of Edinburgh for graduate studies, where she specialised in cognitive science. She returned to the MRC CBU in Cambridge for her doctorate supervised by Prof William Marslen-Wilson, where she investigated how word meanings are processed. Her experiments showed that while words with multiple related senses are recognised faster, words with multiple unrelated meanings are recognised more slowly due to competition between meanings.

Rodd returned to the University of Cambridge and joined Peterhouse as a Research Fellow in the Department of Experimental Psychology. She then moved to University College London as a Leverhulme Trust Early Career Fellow.

== Research and career ==
Rodd works in the Department of Experimental Psychology within the Division of Psychology and Language Sciences at University College London. She was programme director of the BSc/Msci Psychology (2021-2023) and is now Director of Education for the Division of Psychology and Language Sciences. The lab studies how children and adults learn new words, how they access the meanings of words when reading or listening to speech, and why some people are better than others at understanding words.

In 2025 she was awarded the Mid-Career Prize by the Experimental Psychology Society. Her prize lecture was titled "Word Meanings: Are they accessed or constructed?".

== Selected publications ==
- Jennifer M. Rodd. (2020). "Settling into semantic space: An ambiguity-focused account of word-meaning access".Perspectives on Psychological Science 15 (2), 411-427. doi:10.1177/1745691619885860.
- Rodd, Jennifer Mary; Davis, Matthew; Ingrid S Johnsrude (2005). "The neural mechanisms of speech comprehension: fMRI studies of semantic ambiguity". Cerebral Cortex. 15 (8): 1261–1269. doi:10.1093/cercor/bhi009. PMID 15635062. Wikidata Q34382126.
- Rodd, Jennifer Mary; Gareth Gaskell; William Marslen-Wilson (2002). "Making Sense of Semantic Ambiguity: Semantic Competition in Lexical Access". Journal of Memory and Language. 46 (2): 245–266. doi:10.1006/jmla.2001.2810. Wikidata Q54239433.
- M R Coleman; Davis, Matthew; Rodd, Jennifer Mary; T Robson; A Ali; A M Owen; J D Pickard (2009). "Towards the routine use of brain imaging to aid the clinical diagnosis of disorders of consciousness". Brain. 132 (Pt 9): 2541–2552. doi:10.1093/brain/awp183. PMID 19710182. Wikidata Q34999707.

== Personal life ==
Rodd receive a kidney transplant from her brother in 2020.

She is currently secretary of Meridian Triathlon Club.
