= Daniel Miller (cricketer) =

English cricketer

Personal information
- Full name: Daniel James Miller
- Born: 12 June 1983 (age 43); Hammersmith, London, England
- Nickname: Windy, Funky
- Height: 6 ft 4 in (1.93 m)
- Batting: Left-handed
- Bowling: Right-arm medium-fast

Domestic team information
- Years: Team
- 2006: Loughborough UCCE
- 2002: Surrey

Career statistics
Competition	First-class	List A
Matches	2	1
Runs scored	0	1
Batting average	–	1.00
100s/50s	–/–	–/–
Top score	0*	1
Balls bowled	276	42
Wickets	2	–
Bowling average	75.00	–
5 wickets in innings	–	–
10 wickets in match	–	–
Best bowling	1/11	–
Catches/stumpings	–/–	–/–
- Source: Cricinfo, 17 August 2011

Daniel James Miller (born 12 June 1983) is an English cricketer. Miller is a left-handed batsman who bowls right-arm medium-fast. He was born in Hammersmith, London and educated at Ewell Castle School and Kingston College.

Miller made a single appearances for Surrey in 2002, in a List A match against Northamptonshire in the Norwich Union League. Later, while studying for his degree at Loughborough University, Miller made his first-class debut for Loughborough UCCE against Essex in 2006. He made a further first-class appearance for the team in 2006, against Hampshire. In his two first-class matches, he failed to score any runs, while with the ball he took 2 wickets at an average of 75.00, with best figures of 1/11.
