= David Holt (cricketer) =

English cricketer

Personal information
- Full name: David Robert Holt
- Born: 29 December 1981 (age 44); Hammersmith, London, England
- Batting: Right-handed
- Bowling: Right-arm medium

Domestic team information
- Years: Team
- 2005–2006: Loughborough UCCE
- FC debut: 13 April 2005 Loughborough UCCE v Nottinghamshire
- Last FC: 17 May 2006 Loughborough UCCE v Hampshire

Career statistics
Competition	First-class
Matches	2
Runs scored	5
Batting average	5.00
100s/50s	0/0
Top score	5
Catches/stumpings	1/0
- Source: CricketArchive, 17 October 2007

David Robert Holt (born 29 December 1981) is an English cricketer who has also represented the France national cricket team.

== Career ==
David Holt's cricket career began in 1999 when he began to play for the Middlesex second XI. The same year, he represented England Under-19s at the Under-19 European Championship in Belfast, though the next year, he was playing for France at the senior European Championship, qualifying for them due to his French mother. He played just one match in the tournament, against Greece.

He did not play for France again after that year, continuing to play for the Middlesex second XI alongside various other teams before making his first-class debut for Loughborough UCCE against Nottinghamshire in 2005. He played a further first-class match for the university side against Hampshire the following season.
