= Phil Lewis (cricketer) =

English cricketer

Personal information
- Full name: Philip David Lewis
- Born: 4 October 1981 (age 45); Liss, Hampshire, England
- Batting: Right-handed
- Bowling: Right-arm fast-medium

Domestic team information
- Years: Team
- 2005–2007: Dorset
- 2003–2004: Loughborough UCCE

Career statistics
Competition	First-class
Matches	5
Runs scored	115
Batting average	28.75
100s/50s	–/–
Top score	43*
Balls bowled	606
Wickets	10
Bowling average	40.20
5 wickets in innings	–
10 wickets in match	–
Best bowling	3/58
Catches/stumpings	1/–
- Source: Cricinfo, 2 June 2011

Philip David Lewis (born 4 October 1981) is an English cricketer. Lewis is a right-handed batsman who bowls right-arm fast-medium. He was born in Liss, Hampshire.

Having played Second XI cricket for the Somerset Second XI in 2002, Lewis made his first-class debut for Loughborough UCCE against Surrey in 2003. He appeared in 4 further first-class matches for Loughborough UCCE, the last coming against Sussex in 2004. In his 5 matches, he scored 115 runs at a batting average of 28.75, with a high score of 43 not out. With the ball, he took 10 wickets at a bowling average of 40.20, with best figures of 3/58.

Lewis made his debut for Dorset in the 2005 Minor Counties Championship against Wales Minor Counties. He played 2 further matches for Dorset, against Berkshire in 2006 and Herefordshire. He also played a single MCCA Knockout Trophy match against Staffordshire in 2006.
