= Richard Wilkinson (cricketer, born 1982) =

English cricketer

Personal information
- Full name: Richard Malcolm Wilkinson
- Born: 24 November 1982 (age 43); Birkenhead, Cheshire, England
- Batting: Right-handed
- Bowling: Right-arm medium

Domestic team information
- Years: Team
- 2010–2011: Cheshire
- 2004–2005: Loughborough UCCE

Career statistics
| Competition | First-class |
|---|---|
| Matches | 5 |
| Runs scored | 119 |
| Batting average | 19.83 |
| 100s/50s | 0/0 |
| Top score | 49 |
| Balls bowled | 516 |
| Wickets | 5 |
| Bowling average | 64.20 |
| 5 wickets in innings | 0 |
| 10 wickets in match | 0 |
| Best bowling | 2/24 |
| Catches/stumpings | 5/– |
- Source: Cricinfo, 4 April 2011

Richard Malcolm Wilkinson (born 24 November 1982) is an English cricketer. Wilkinson is a right-handed batsman who bowls right-arm medium pace. He was born in Birkenhead, Cheshire.

Wilkinson played for the Worcestershire Second XI in one Second XI Championship and two Second XI Trophy matches in the 2000 season. He then played a further four Second XI Trophy matches for the Marylebone Cricket Club Young Cricketers in 2002.

Wilkinson made his first-class debut for Loughborough UCCE against Gloucestershire in 2004. He played four further first-class matches, one in 2004 and three in 2005. His final first-class match came against Worcestershire. In his five first-class matches, he scored 119 runs at a batting average of 19.83, with a high score of 49. With the ball he took 5 wickets at an expensive bowling average of 62.50, with best figures of 2/24. His highest first-class score with the bat came on debut against Gloucestershire, with Wilkinson sharing in a partnership of 78 with Chris Benham, which was the largest partnership in the Loughborough UCCE first-innings.

In 2010, he joined Cheshire where he played seven Minor Counties Championship and four MCCA Knockout Trophy matches from 2010 to 2011.
