= Will Gifford =

English cricketer

Personal information
- Full name: William McLean Gifford
- Born: 10 October 1985 (age 41); Sutton Coldfield, England
- Batting: Right-handed

Career statistics
Competition	FC	LA
Matches	8	1
Runs scored	252	1
Batting average	22.90	1.00
100s/50s	0/2	0/0
Top score	71	1
Balls bowled	0	0
Wickets	0	0
Bowling average	–	–
5 wickets in innings	0	0
10 wickets in match	0	0
Best bowling	–	–
Catches/stumpings	4/0	2/0
- Source: CricketArchive, 6 May 2009

William McLean Gifford (born 10 October 1985) is an English cricketer who has played first-class cricket for Loughborough UCCE and one List A game for Worcestershire. He is, as Wisden put it, "no known relation" to former Worcestershire captain Norman Gifford.

== Early life and career ==
Gifford was educated at Malvern College, where he was captain of the First XI cricket team, and played against a Worcestershire Development XI in 2000. In 2002 he scored 104 for Worcestershire Under-19s against their Glamorgan counterparts, putting on 292 for the fourth wicket with Craig Everett (215 not out). In 2003 and 2004 Gifford made a number of appearances for Worcestershire Second XI, his innings including 104 against Gloucestershire II in May 2004. In 2004–05 he was selected for the England Under-19s' tour of India, playing in two Youth Tests and four Youth ODIs.

== Loughborough UCCE ==
In April 2005, Gifford made his first-class debut, captaining Loughborough UCCE against Sussex at Hove, scoring 19 and 12 in a drawn game. He played seven further first-class matches for Loughborough UCCE between then and May 2007, including leading the side to an eight-wicket victory over Worcestershire at Kidderminster in May 2005. His highest score of 71 was made against Yorkshire at Headingley in May 2007; Yorkshire won by a single run. Gifford was not captain in this match.

== Worcestershire and after ==
Gifford made only one first-team appearance for Worcestershire, when he played in a List A game at Worcester against West Indies A in July 2006, scoring just 1. While at Worcestershire, he played club cricket for Kidderminster Victoria in the Cockspur Cup, hitting 94 in a narrow quarter-final defeat by Kibworth.

Although he scored 125 for Worcestershire II against Leicestershire seconds in early August 2007, the following month Worcestershire announced that his summer scholarship deal would not be upgraded to a full contract.

Gifford played for Esher against Mitcham in the 2008 Cockspur Cup.
