= Phil Hay =

Phil Hay may refer to:

- Phil Hay (footballer) (born 1938), Australian footballer for Hawthorn
- Phil Hay (screenwriter), American screenwriter

== See also ==
- Philip Hayes (disambiguation)
- Philip Hays (born 1930), American illustrator
