= Jack Sterland =

English cricketer (born 1993)

Personal information
- Full name: Jack Lee Sterland
- Born: 7 January 1993 (age 33); Chelmsford, Essex, England
- Batting: Right-handed
- Bowling: Right-arm off break

Domestic team information
- Years: Team
- 2014: Loughborough MCCU

Career statistics
Competition	First-class
Matches	2
Runs scored	42
Batting average	14.00
100s/50s	–/–
Top score	6
Balls bowled	0
Wickets	2
Bowling average	–
5 wickets in innings	–
10 wickets in match	–
Best bowling	–
Catches/stumpings	1/–
- Source: Cricinfo, 6 August 2020

Jack Lee Sterland (born 7 January 1993) is an English former first-class cricketer.

Sterland was born at Chelmsford in January 1993. He later studied at Loughborough University, where he played two first-class cricket matches for Loughborough MCCU against Sussex and Kent in 2014. He scored 42 runs in his two matches, with a high score of 27.
