= Michael Turns =

English cricketer

Personal information
- Full name: Michael Turns
- Born: 14 November 1990 (age 35); Sunderland, County Durham, England
- Nickname: Turnsy, Chris Evans
- Batting: Right-handed
- Bowling: Right-arm medium

Domestic team information
- Years: Team
- 2011: Loughborough MCCU
- 2009–present: Northumberland

Career statistics
Competition	First-class
Matches	2
Runs scored	120
Batting average	60.00
100s/50s	–/1
Top score	80
Balls bowled	144
Wickets	3
Bowling average	36.00
5 wickets in innings	–
10 wickets in match	–
Best bowling	1/22
Catches/stumpings	2/–
- Source: Cricinfo, 15 August 2011

Michael Turns (born 14 November 1990) is an English cricketer. Turns is a right-handed batsman who bowls right-arm medium pace. He was born in Sunderland, County Durham.

Turns made his debut for Northumberland in the 2009 Minor Counties Championship against Bedfordshire. He had made six further appearances to date for Northumberland. While studying for his degree in Sport and Exercise Science at Loughborough University, Turns made his first-class debut for Loughborough MCCU against Leicestershire in 2011. He has made a further first-class appearance against Kent. His two first-class appearances have so far seen him score 120 runs at an average of 60.00, with a high score of 80. With the ball, he has taken 3 wickets at a bowling average of 36.00, with best figures of 1/22.
