= Rhodri Evans =

Welsh cricketer

Personal information
- Full name: Rhodri Francis Evans
- Born: 6 December 1989 (age 36); Swansea, Glamorgan, Wales
- Batting: Left-handed
- Bowling: Right-arm medium

Domestic team information
- Years: Team
- 2009–2010: Loughborough UCCE
- 2007–2013: Wales Minor Counties

Career statistics
Competition	First-class
Matches	4
Runs scored	67
Batting average	16.75
100s/50s	–/–
Top score	44
Balls bowled	264
Wickets	2
Bowling average	108.50
5 wickets in innings	–
10 wickets in match	–
Best bowling	1/57
Catches/stumpings	2/–
- Source: Cricinfo, 13 July 2011

Rhodri Francis Evans (born 6 December 1989) is a Welsh cricketer. Evans is a left-handed batsman who bowls right-arm medium pace. He was born in Swansea, Glamorgan.

Evans made his debut for Wales Minor Counties in the 2007 Minor Counties Championship against Oxfordshire. He has played Minor counties cricket for Wales Minor Counties from 2007 to present, which has included 9 Minor Counties Championship appearances and 7 MCCA Knockout Trophy matches.

While studying at Loughborough University, Evans made his first-class debut for Loughborough UCCE against Kent in 2009. He made 3 further first-class appearances for Loughborough UCCE, the last of which came against Yorkshire. In his 4 first-class matches, he scored 67 runs at an average of 16.75, with a high score of 44. With the ball, he took 2 wickets at an expensive bowling average of 108.50, with best figures of 1/57.
