= Peter Groves =

English cricketer (born 1988)

Personal information
- Full name: Peter Richard Groves
- Born: 30 June 1988 (age 38); Bromley, Kent, England
- Height: 6 ft 1 in (1.85 m)
- Batting: Right-handed
- Bowling: Right-arm medium-fast

Domestic team information
- Years: Team
- 2010: Loughborough MCCU
- 2009: Loughborough UCCE

Career statistics
Competition	First-class
Matches	5
Runs scored	139
Batting average	69.50
100s/50s	–/1
Top score	52
Balls bowled	474
Wickets	11
Bowling average	31.72
5 wickets in innings	1
10 wickets in match	–
Best bowling	5/72
Catches/stumpings	–/–
- Source: Cricinfo, 16 August 2011

Peter Richard Groves (born 30 June 1988) is an English cricketer. Groves is a right-handed batsman who bowls right-arm medium-fast. He was born in Bromley, Kent, and was educated at Hull Grammar School.

While studying for his degree at Loughborough University, Groves made his first-class debut for Loughborough UCCE against Leicestershire in 2010. He made two further appearances for the team in 2010, against Kent and Hampshire. The following season he played two further first-class matches for the team (by now called Loughborough MCCU following a name change) against Kent and Yorkshire. In his five first-class matches, Groves scored 139 runs at an average of 69.50, with a high score of 52. With the ball, he took 11 wickets at a bowling average of 31.72, with best figures of 5/72.
