= Marc Rosenberg (cricketer) =

South African cricketer (born 1982)

Personal information
- Full name: Marc Christopher Rosenberg
- Born: 10 February 1982 (age 44); Johannesburg, Transvaal, South Africa
- Batting: Right-handed
- Bowling: Right-arm medium
- Role: All-rounder

Domestic team information
- Years: Team
- 2004: Loughborough University
- 2004–2005: North West
- 2006–2007: Leicestershire
- 2009: Cambridge University
- First-class debut: 10 April 2004 Loughborough University v Somerset
- Last First-class: 11 April 2009 Cambridge University v Yorkshire
- List A debut: 24 October 2004 North West v Griqualand West
- Last List A: 19 August 2007 Leicestershire v Yorkshire

Career statistics
Competition	First-class	List A
Matches	14	6
Runs scored	385	29
Batting average	22.64	9.66
100s/50s	0/2	0/0
Top score	86	26
Balls bowled	225	18
Wickets	4	3
Bowling average	42.50	5.66
5 wickets in innings	0	0
10 wickets in match	0	n/a
Best bowling	2/56	3/17
Catches/stumpings	3/–	1/–
- Source: ESPNcricinfo, 2 April 2017

Marc Christopher Rosenberg (born 10 February 1982 in Johannesburg, South Africa) is a South African cricketer who played first-class cricket for Leicestershire.

Rosenberg has also played first-class games for Loughborough UCCE, for North West in South Africa, and, in 2009, for the Cambridge University Centre of Cricketing Excellence. He graduated from Loughborough University in 2004.

Rosenberg was an all rounder.

Post his professional career Rosenberg completed his Post Graduate Studies at Cambridge University where he played for the Blues in Golf, Rugby and Cricket. His man of the match performance in The Blues Match at Lords was a fitting last hurrah in his short career.
