= Tom Winslade =

English cricketer

Personal information
- Full name: Thomas Simon Winslade
- Born: 28 May 1990 (age 36); Epsom, Surrey, England
- Height: 6 ft 1 in (1.85 m)
- Batting: Right-handed
- Bowling: Right-arm off break

Domestic team information
- Years: Team
- 2010: Loughborough MCCU

Career statistics
Competition	First-class
Matches	1
Runs scored	18
Batting average	9.00
100s/50s	–/–
Top score	17
Balls bowled	–
Wickets	–
Bowling average	–
5 wickets in innings	–
10 wickets in match	–
Best bowling	–
Catches/stumpings	–/–
- Source: Cricinfo, 16 August 2011

Thomas Simon Winslade (born 28 May 1990) is an English cricketer. Winslade is a right-handed batsman who bowls right-arm off break. He was born in Epsom, Surrey.

While studying for his degree at Loughborough University, Winslade made his only first-class appearance for Loughborough MCCU against Kent in 2010. Opening the batting in this match, he scored a single run in Loughborough's first-innings, before being dismissed Simon Cook, while in their second-innings he was dismissed for 17 by Joe Denly, with the match ending in a draw.
