= Jonny Hughes =

English cricketer (born 1985)

Personal information
- Full name: Jonathan Adam Hughes
- Born: 12 September 1985 (age 41); Slough, Berkshire, England
- Batting: Right-handed
- Bowling: Right-arm medium-fast

Domestic team information
- Years: Team
- 2007–2008: Loughborough UCCE
- 2003 & 2008: Buckinghamshire

Career statistics
Competition	First-class
Matches	6
Runs scored	149
Batting average	21.28
100s/50s	–/–
Top score	45
Balls bowled	355
Wickets	7
Bowling average	34.14
5 wickets in innings	–
10 wickets in match	–
Best bowling	3/33
Catches/stumpings	–/–
- Source: Cricinfo, 4 May 2011

Jonathan Adam Hughes (born 12 September 1985) is an English cricketer. Hughes is a right-handed batsman who bowls right-arm medium-fast. He was born in Slough, Berkshire.

Hughes made his debut for Buckinghamshire in the 2003 MCCA Knockout Trophy against Wiltshire. His next Minor counties appearance for Buckinghamshire did not come until 2008, when he played a further Trophy match against Cambridgeshire. He played a single Minor Counties Championship match in 2008 against Norfolk.

Hughes made his first-class debut for Loughborough UCCE against Somerset in 2007. He played a further five first-class fixtures spread over 2007 and 2008, the last coming against Worcestershire. In his six first-class matches he scored 149 runs at a batting average of 21.28, with a high score of 45. With the ball he took seven wickets at a bowling average of 34.14, with best figures 3/33.
