= Frederick Daeche-Marshall =

English cricketer (born 1991)

Personal information
- Full name: Frederick William Daeche-Marshall
- Born: 10 August 1991 (age 35); Enfield, London, England
- Height: 5 ft 11 in (1.80 m)
- Batting: Right-handed
- Bowling: Right-arm medium

Domestic team information
- Years: Team
- 2012: Loughborough MCCU

Career statistics
Competition	First-class
Matches	2
Runs scored	36
Batting average	12.00
100s/50s	–/–
Top score	32
Catches/stumpings	–/–
- Source: Cricinfo, 6 August 2020

Frederick William Daeche-Marshall (born 10 August 1991) is an English former first-class cricketer.

Daeche-Marshall was born at Enfield in August 1991. He was educated at Mill Hill School, before going up to Loughborough University. While studying at Loughborough, he made two appearances in first-class cricket for Loughborough MCCU against Nottinghamshire and Hampshire in 2012. He scored 36 runs in his two matches, with a high score of 32.
