= Martin Fearon =

English cricketer (born 1991)

Personal information
- Full name: Richard Martin Fearon
- Born: 30 July 1991 (age 35); South Shields, County Durham, England
- Nickname: Fearsome, Fearon, Ron
- Batting: Right-handed
- Bowling: Right-arm off break

Domestic team information
- Years: Team
- 2010–2011: Northumberland
- 2011: Loughborough MCCU

Career statistics
Competition	List A
Matches	1
Runs scored	8
Batting average	4.00
100s/50s	0/0
Top score	8
Balls bowled	90
Wickets	0
Bowling average	–
5 wickets in innings	–
10 wickets in match	–
Best bowling	–
Catches/stumpings	1/–
- Source: Cricinfo, 30 June 2011

Richard Martin Fearon (born 30 July 1991) is an English former cricketer. Fearon played as a right-handed batsman who bowled right-arm off break. He was born in South Shields, County Durham.

Having appeared once for the Durham Second XI in 2009, Fearon proceeded to make a single appearance for Northumberland in the 2010 Minor Counties Championship against Norfolk. While studying Automotive Materials Engineering at Loughborough University, Fearon made his first-class debut for Loughborough MCCU against Kent. In Loughborough's first-innings, he was dismissed for a duck by Neil Saker, while in their second-innings he was dismissed by Adam Riley. This is his only first-class match to date.
