= Toby Lester (cricketer) =

English cricketer (born 1993)

Personal information
- Full name: Toby James Lester
- Born: 5 April 1993 (age 33); Blackpool, Lancashire, England
- Height: 6 ft 4 in (1.93 m)
- Batting: Right-handed
- Bowling: Left-arm fast-medium
- Role: Bowler

Domestic team information
- Years: Team
- 2012–2014: Loughborough MCCU
- 2015–2020: Lancashire (squad no. 5)
- 2019: → Warwickshire (on loan)
- First-class debut: 1 April 2012 Loughborough MCCU v Nottinghamshire
- Twenty20 debut: 6 July 2018 Lancashire v Derbyshire

Career statistics
| Competition | First-class | T20 |
|---|---|---|
| Matches | 13 | 13 |
| Runs scored | 22 | 8 |
| Batting average | 3.66 | 4.00 |
| 100s/50s | 0/0 | 0/0 |
| Top score | 8 | 7* |
| Balls bowled | 1,771 | 238 |
| Wickets | 17 | 15 |
| Bowling average | 66.58 | 23.33 |
| 5 wickets in innings | 0 | 0 |
| 10 wickets in match | 0 | 0 |
| Best bowling | 4/41 | 4/25 |
| Catches/stumpings | 3/– | 3/– |
- Source: CricketArchive, 20 August 2019

Toby James Lester (born 5 April 1993) is an English cricketer who last played for Lancashire County Cricket Club. Primarily a left-arm fast-medium bowler, he also bats right handed. He made his Twenty20 debut for Lancashire in the 2018 t20 Blast on 6 July 2018. Lester was released by Lancashire at the end of the 2020 season after six years with the club.
