= Stephen Wheeler =

English cricketer

Personal information
- Full name: Stephen James Wheeler
- Born: 16 October 1986 (age 40); Frimley, Surrey, England
- Height: 6 ft 0 in (1.83 m)
- Batting: Right-handed
- Bowling: Right-arm fast-medium

Domestic team information
- Years: Team
- 2010–present: Berkshire
- 2007: Loughborough UCCE

Career statistics
Competition	First-class
Matches	3
Runs scored	33
Batting average	8.25
100s/50s	–/–
Top score	13
Balls bowled	412
Wickets	1
Bowling average	312.00
5 wickets in innings	–
10 wickets in match	–
Best bowling	1/72
Catches/stumpings	1/–
- Source: Cricinfo, 16 August 2011

Stephen James Wheeler (born 16 October 1986) is an English cricketer. Wheeler is a right-handed batsman who bowls right-arm fast-medium. He was born in Frimley, Surrey, England.

While studying for his degree at Loughborough University, Wheeler made his first-class debut for Loughborough UCCE against Somerset in 2007. He made a further two first-class appearances for the team in 2007, against Worcestershire and Yorkshire. In his three first-class matches, he scored 33 runs at an average of 8.25, with a high score of 13. With the ball, he took a single wicket, which came at an overall cost of 312 runs. Wheeler consequently has a first-class bowling average of 312.00, which is the worst by an Englishman and third-worst of all time – only two Indian players, Krishna Kumar (375.00) and Ashok Malhotra (347.00), have higher first-class averages.

Wheeler later made his debut for Berkshire in the 2010 MCCA Knockout Trophy against Norfolk. To date, he has made six appearances each in the Minor Counties Championship and MCCA Knockout Trophy.
