= Tom Burrows =

English cricketer and lawyer (born 1985)

Personal information
- Full name: Thomas George Burrows
- Born: 5 May 1985 (age 41); Wokingham, Berkshire, England
- Nickname: T
- Height: 5 ft 8 in (1.73 m)
- Batting: Right-handed
- Role: Wicket-keeper

Domestic team information
- Years: Team
- 2001–2003: Berkshire
- 2005–2009: Hampshire (squad no. 32)

Career statistics
Competition	FC	LA	T20
Matches	12	10	2
Runs scored	247	51	0
Batting average	19.00	10.20	0.00
100s/50s	–/–	–/–	–/–
Top score	42	25	0
Catches/stumpings	36/1	9/2	2/–
- Source: Cricinfo, 27 August 2009

Thomas George Burrows (born 5 May 1985) is an English lawyer and former cricketer.

Burrows was born at Wokingham in May 1985. He was educated at Reading School. A wicket-keeper, Burrows initially played minor counties cricket for Berkshire, making his debut against Wales Minor Counties in the 2001 Minor Counties Championship. He played minor counties cricket for Berkshire until 2003, making five appearances in the Minor Counties Championship and one in the MCCA Knockout Trophy. He also made his debut in List A one-day cricket for Berkshire, against Durham at Reading in the 3rd round of the 2003 Cheltenham & Gloucester Trophy. Burrows was a member of the Hampshire academy, whom he played club cricket for in the Southern Premier League. In the 2002 season, he stood in as a substitute for wicket-keeper Nic Pothas (who had injured his knee) midway through Hampshire's County Championship match against Yorkshire.

However, it would be a further three years before he made his full debut for Hampshire, with Burrows' full debut coming in a first-class match against Kent in the 2005 County Championship at Canterbury. His debut was notable for his innings of 42 in Hampshire's first innings, which assisted Shane Warne (107 not out) in making his maiden first-class century; the two of them shared a partnership for the eighth wicket of 131. Over the following four years, Burrows made a further eleven first-class appearances. He made his one-day debut for Hampshire against Glamorgan in the 2006 Cheltenham & Gloucester Trophy and made a further eight one-day appearances for Hampshire to 2009; he also made two appearances in Twenty20 cricket against Sussex in the 2005 Twenty20 Cup, and Northamptonshire in the 2009 Twenty20 Cup. In first-class cricket, he scored 247 runs at an average of exactly 19; in one-day cricket, he scored 50 runs with a highest score of 25. His opportunities at Hampshire were limited by the presence of first-choice wicket-keeper Nic Pothas. As a result, Burrows was released by Hampshire at the end of the 2009 season, alongside Tom Parsons and Chris Morgan.

Following the end of his cricket career, Burrows has become a sports lawyer. He joined DAZN Group in 2015, where he works in a rights acquisition strategy role.
