= Alex Welsh (cricketer) =

English cricketer

Personal information
- Full name: Alex Stephen Welsh
- Born: 1 September 1988 (age 38); Sheffield, South Yorkshire, England
- Nickname: Welshie, Badger
- Height: 5 ft 11 in (1.80 m)
- Batting: Right-handed
- Bowling: Slow left-arm orthodox

Domestic team information
- Years: Team
- 2010: Loughborough MCCU

Career statistics
Competition	First-class
Matches	2
Runs scored	30
Batting average	15.00
100s/50s	–/–
Top score	21
Balls bowled	256
Wickets	4
Bowling average	38.00
5 wickets in innings	–
10 wickets in match	–
Best bowling	3/32
Catches/stumpings	1/–
- Source: Cricinfo, 16 August 2011

Alex Stephen Welsh (born 1 September 1988) is an English cricketer. Welsh is a right-handed batsman who bowls slow left-arm orthodox. He was born in Sheffield, Yorkshire.

While studying for his degree at Loughborough University, Welsh made his first-class debut for Loughborough MCCU against Kent in 2010. He made a further first-class appearance in 2010, against Yorkshire. His two first-class appearances saw him score 30 runs at an average of 15.00, with a high score of 21. With the ball, he took 4 wickets at a bowling average of 38.00, with best figures of 3/32.
