= Simon Rose (cricketer) =

English cricketer (born 1989)

Personal information
- Full name: Simon Alexander Leslie Rose
- Born: 6 January 1989 (age 37); Huntingdon, Cambridgeshire, England
- Height: 6 ft 4 in (1.93 m)
- Batting: Right-handed
- Bowling: Right-arm medium-fast

Domestic team information
- Years: Team
- 2011: Wiltshire
- 2010: Loughborough MCCU

Career statistics
Competition	First-class
Matches	2
Runs scored	14
Batting average	14.00
100s/50s	0/0
Top score	14
Balls bowled	318
Wickets	1
Bowling average	216.00
5 wickets in innings	0
10 wickets in match	0
Best bowling	1/72
Catches/stumpings	0/–
- Source: Cricinfo, 16 August 2011

Simon Alexander Leslie Rose (born 6 January 1989) is an English cricketer. Rose is a right-handed batsman who bowls right-arm medium-fast. He was born in Huntingdon, Cambridgeshire.

While studying for his degree at Loughborough University, Rose made his first-class debut for Loughborough MCCU against Kent in 2010. He made a further appearance for the team in 2010, against Yorkshire. In his two first-class matches, he scored 14 runs, while with the ball he took a single wicket at an overall cost of 216 runs.

In 2011, he joined Wiltshire, making his debut for the county against Oxfordshire in the Minor Counties Championship. He made two further appearances in that competition in 2011.
