= Danny Cox (cricketer) =

English cricketer (born 1992)

Dannyjo Cox
Personal information
- Full name: Dannyjo McEvoy Cox
- Born: 30 July 1992 (age 34); Wolverhampton, Staffordshire, England
- Nickname: Coxy
- Height: 6 ft 1 in (1.85 m)
- Batting: Right-handed
- Bowling: Right-arm off spin
- Role: Occasional wicket-keeper

Domestic team information
- Years: Team
- 2011: Loughborough MCCU
- 2011–2014: Herefordshire County Cricket Club

Career statistics
Competition	First-class
Matches	2
Runs scored	32
Batting average	8.00
100s/50s	0/0
Top score	18
Catches/stumpings
- Source: Cricinfo, 16 August 2011

Dannyjo Cox (born 30 July 1992) is an English cricketer. Cox is a right-handed batsman who fields occasionally as a wicket-keeper. He was born in Wolverhampton, Staffordshire.

While studying for his degree in Mathematics and Sport Science at Loughborough University, Cox made his first-class debut for Loughborough MCCU against Northamptonshire in 2011. He made a further first-class appearance in 2011, against Leicestershire. His two first-class appearances have so far seen him score 32 runs at an average of 8.00, with a high score of 18.

He is now club captain at Old Hill Cricket Club in the Birmingham and District Premier League. He has also represented Herefordshire County Cricket Club averaging 39.92 with the bat in all competitions over 3 seasons (2011–2014).
