= Daniel Cox (physician) =

British physician

- Died: January 1750
- Occupation: Physician

Daniel Cox (died January 1750) was a British physician.

== Biography ==
Cox proceeded M.D. at St. Andrews on 8 November 1742, was admitted licentiate of the Royal College of Physicians on 26 June 1749, elected physician to the Middlesex Hospital on 16 October 1746, resigned 23 May 1749, and died in January 1750. He wrote ‘Observations on the Epidemic Fever of 1741, … with Remarks on the use of Cortex,’ published anonymously 1741; ‘with new cases, and on the benefit of the cool method,’ 1742; third edition, ‘with … the benefit of bleeding and purging,’ 1742. Cox is said by Munk to have died in January 1750; if so, he cannot have written, as Munk says, ‘An Appeal to the Public on behalf of Elizabeth Canning’, 1st and 2nd editions 1753; the introduction to Lorenz Heister's ‘Medical and Anatomical Cases,’ 1755; letter on the subject of inoculation, 1757, 1758; and ‘Observations on the Intermittent Pulse,’ 1758. To this Daniel Cox, Munk and the compilers of the catalogue of the Library of the Royal Medical Society attribute ‘Family Medical Compendium,’ published at Gloucester. This appears to be an error; for the ‘Medical Compendium’ seems to have been first published about 1690, and an enlarged and improved edition in 1808, by D. Cox, chemist and druggist, of Gloucester. It is dedicated to Sir Walter Farquhar, and the 1808 edition ends with advertisements of the author's wares.
