= David Murphy (cricketer) =

English cricketer (born 1989)

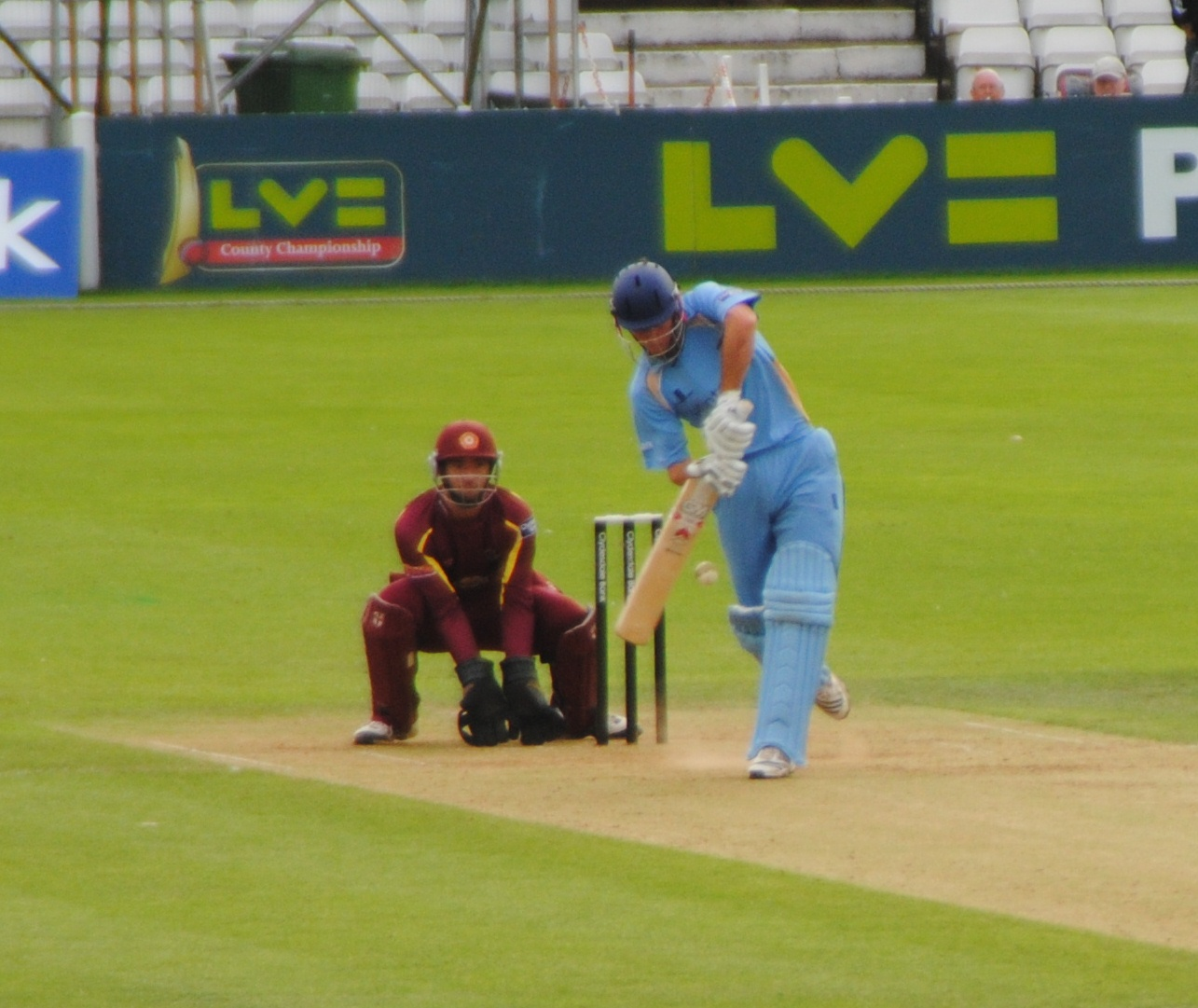

Personal information
- Full name: David Murphy
- Born: 24 June 1989 (age 37); Welwyn Garden City, Hertfordshire, England
- Height: 6 ft 1 in (1.85 m)
- Batting: Right-handed
- Role: Wicket-keeper

International information
- National side: Scotland (2012–2016)
- ODI debut (cap 49): 6 March 2013 v Afghanistan
- Last ODI: 8 September 2013 v Ireland
- T20I debut (cap 31): 3 March 2013 v Afghanistan
- Last T20I: 19 November 2013 v Kenya

Domestic team information
- Years: Team
- 2009–2011: Loughborough MCCU
- 2009–2017: Northamptonshire (squad no. 19)

Career statistics
Competition	ODI	T20I	FC	LA
Matches	8	4	78	40
Runs scored	58	35	2,205	272
Batting average	11.60	35.00	26.56	22.66
100s/50s	0/0	0/0	1/12	0/0
Top score	20*	20	135*	31*
Balls bowled	–	–	36	–
Wickets	–	–	1	–
Bowling average	–	–	43.00	–
5 wickets in innings	–	–	0	–
10 wickets in match	–	–	0	–
Best bowling	–	–	1/40	–
Catches/stumpings	8/3	1/0	207/19	26/12
- Source: CricketArchive, 28 September 2017

David Murphy (born 24 June 1989) is a former English cricketer. who played for Northamptonshire and Scotland and is primarily a wicket-keeper.

== Career ==
=== Domestic ===
He made his first-class debut for Loughborough UCCE in April 2009 and made his county debut with Northants against Surrey two months later. His first One Day game came against the Netherlands the following season, Murphy scoring 31 not out, taking two catches and one stumping. Niall O'Brien, Northamptonshire's established wicket-keeper, underwent finger surgery in July 2010; Murphy was chosen to take over as wicketkeeper in O'Brien's absence.

In October 2012, Murphy signed a new two-year contract in response to Niall O'Brien's impending move to Leicestershire. It was planned that Murphy would become Northants' first choice keeper from the 2013 season. He played 14 first-class matches in that season, but subsequently found opportunities limited by injuries and the presence of Ben Duckett and Adam Rossington, both of whom can keep wicket.

Murphy was on the winning side in the 2013 Twenty20 competition, playing in all of Northants' 13 matches, including the final against Surrey. Hitherto, he has scored just one first-class century, 135* against Surrey at The Oval, in September 2015.

=== International ===
In September 2012, Murphy was selected by Scotland to be part of a tour group to South Africa in October 2012. Although born in Hertfordshire, Murphy qualifies to play for Scotland by having a Scottish parent. He made his Twenty20 international debut on 3 March 2013, against Afghanistan, and his ODI debut three days later against the same opposition. He has played four international T20 matches and 8 ODIs, all of which took place in 2013.
