= Stürmer =

Stürmer may refer to:

- Der Stürmer, Nazi newspaper published from 1923 to 1945.

== People named Stürmer (Stuermer) ==
- Bartholomäus von Stürmer (1787–1863), Austrian diplomat
- Boris Stürmer (1848–1917), prime minister of Russia during several months in 1916
- Christina Stürmer (b. 1982), Austrian pop singer
- Daryl Stuermer (b. 1952), American musician
- Marcel Stürmer (born 1985), Brazilian artistic roller skater
- Michael Stürmer (1938 –2026), German historian
