= Chris Sanders (cricketer) =

English cricketer (born 1998)

Personal information
- Full name: Christopher William Gibbon Sanders
- Born: 9 October 1998 (age 28); Stockport, Greater Manchester, England
- Batting: Right-handed
- Bowling: Right-arm fast-medium
- Relatives: Erica Sanders (Great Britain Hockey)

Domestic team information
- Years: Team
- 2017–2018: Cheshire
- 2018–2019: Loughborough MCCU

Career statistics
Competition	First-class
Matches	4
Runs scored	80
Batting average	16.00
100s/50s	0/1
Top score	56
Balls bowled	582
Wickets	5
Bowling average	74.80
5 wickets in innings	0
10 wickets in match	0
Best bowling	2/67
Catches/stumpings	0/–
- Source: Cricinfo, 4 August 2025

Christopher William Gibbon Sanders (born 9 October 1998) is an English first-class cricketer.

Born at Stockport, Sanders was educated at Sedbergh School, where he played for the school cricket team. From Sedbergh, he went up to Loughborough University, where he made his debut in first-class cricket for Loughborough MCCU against Sussex at Hove in 2018. He played a further first-class match for Loughborough in 2018, against Lancashire. Sanders made his debut in minor counties cricket for Cheshire in 2017, appearing in two Minor Counties Championship matches to date.
