= Ian Sturmer =

English cricketer

Personal information
- Full name: Ian Sturmer
- Born: 23 August 1991 (age 35); Chiddingly, Sussex, England
- Nickname: Sturms, Sturmo
- Batting: Right-handed
- Bowling: Right-arm medium

Domestic team information
- Years: Team
- 2011–2012: Loughborough MCCU
- 2012: Berkshire

Career statistics
Competition	First-class
Matches	2
Runs scored	12
Batting average	6.00
100s/50s	0/0
Top score	5
Balls bowled	180
Wickets	2
Bowling average	80.50
5 wickets in innings	0
10 wickets in match	0
Best bowling	1/35
Catches/stumpings	2/–
- Source: Cricinfo, 16 August 2014

Ian Sturmer (born 23 August 1991) is an English former cricketer. Sturmer played as a right-handed batsman who bowled right-arm medium pace. He was born in Chiddingly, Sussex.

While studying for his degree in Information Management and Business Studies at Loughborough University, Sturmer made his first-class debut for Loughborough MCCU against Kent in 2011. In this match, he bowled 7 wicket-less overs in Kent's only innings of the match. With the bat, Sturmer scored 2 not out in Loughborough's first-innings, while in their second he was dismissed for 5 runs by Adam Riley.
