= Daniel Cox (physicist) =

- Known for: Physicist and Biophysicist

Daniel L. Cox is an American condensed matter physicist and biophysicist.

Cox earned his doctorate from Cornell University in 1985, and was a postdoctoral researcher at the University of California, San Diego. He began teaching at Ohio State University in 1986 as an assistant professor. He was promoted to an associate professorship in 1990, and became a full professor in 1994. Cox subsequently joined the University of California, Davis in 1996. He is the lead researcher of the Cox Group. Cox was awarded a Guggenheim fellowship in 2004, and elected a fellow of the American Physical Society in 2011 "[f]or identifying energetic and symmetry principles for observation of non-Fermi liquid and Kondo impurity physics".
