= Rob White (cricketer) =

English cricketer and umpire

Robert White
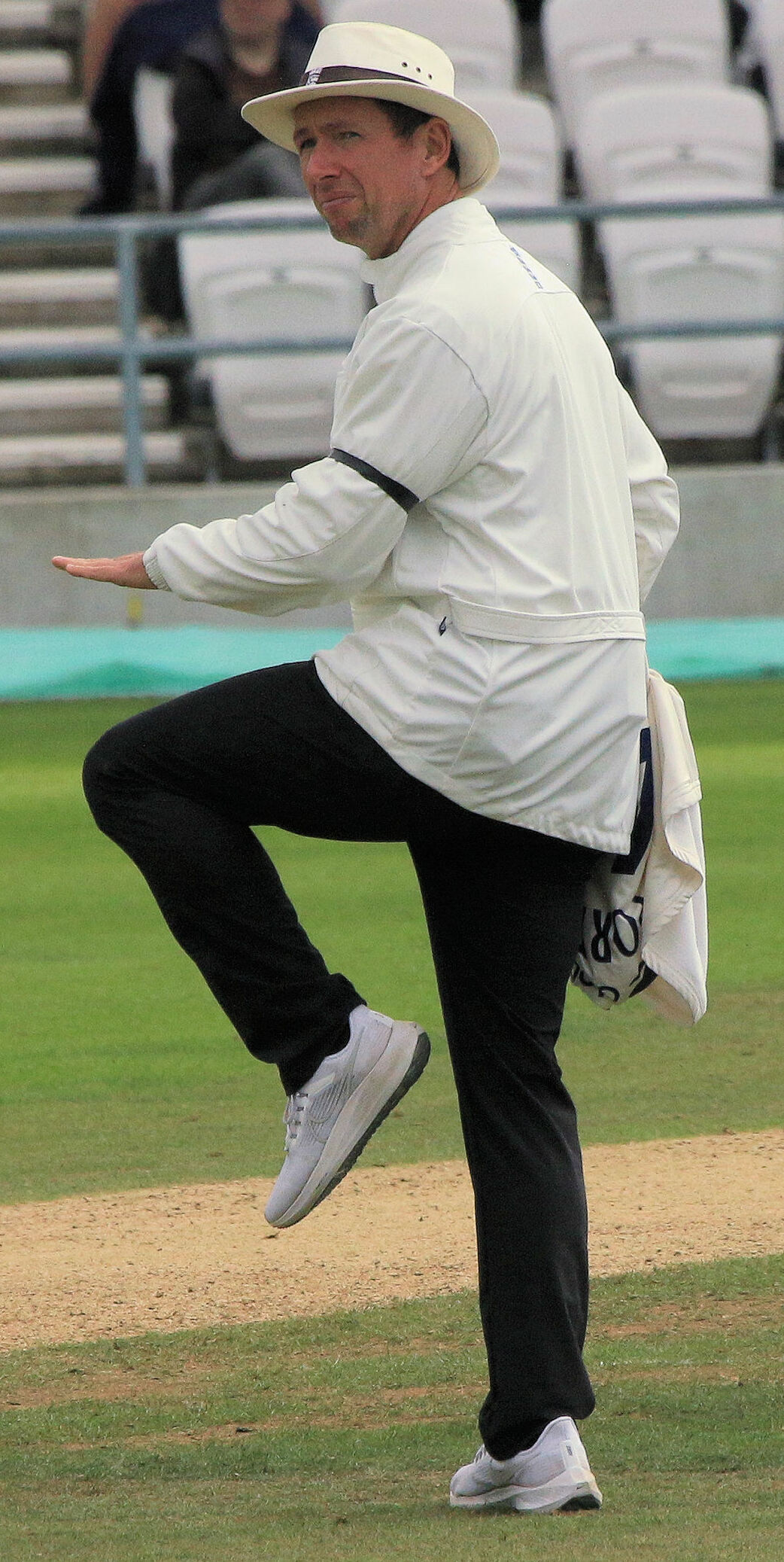
- White in 2022

Personal information
- Full name: Robert Allan White
- Born: 15 October 1979 (age 47); Chelmsford, England
- Nickname: Toff
- Height: 5 ft 11 in (1.80 m)
- Batting: Right-handed
- Bowling: Right-arm off spin
- Role: Middle Order Batsman
- Relatives: Ryan Cummins (Brother in Law)

Domestic team information
- Years: Team
- 2002–2012: Northamptonshire (squad no. 18)

Umpiring information
- WODIs umpired: 4 (2024–2025)
- WT20Is umpired: 2 (2023)

Career statistics
Competition	FC	LA	T20
Matches	100	83	55
Runs scored	5,173	1,782	1,122
Batting average	32.94	23.44	23.31
100s/50s	7/27	2/10	0/6
Top score	277	111	94*
Balls bowled	1,240	54	0
Wickets	16	2	–
Bowling average	53.75	27.50	–
5 wickets in innings	0	0	–
10 wickets in match	0	0	–
Best bowling	2/30	2/18	–
Catches/stumpings	60/–	18/–	11/–
- Source: Cricinfo, 18 April 2011

Robert Allan White (born 15 October 1979) is a former English professional cricketer and current umpire.

== Biography ==
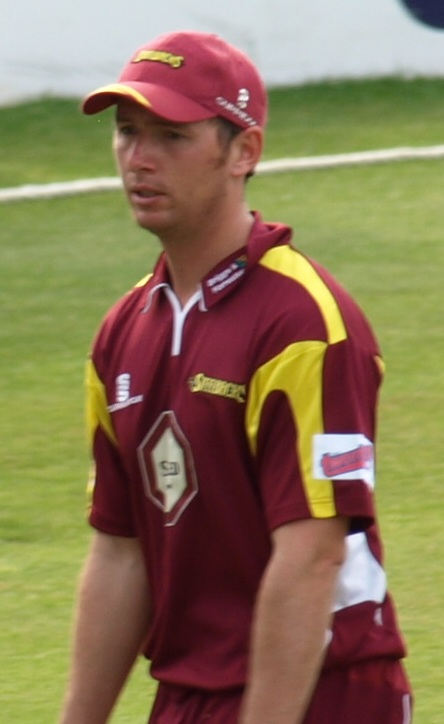
White playing for Northamptonshire

Born 15 October 1979, Chelmsford, Essex, White received his upper school education at Stowe School in Buckinghamshire before attending Durham (St John's College) and Loughborough Universities.

He played cricket for Northamptonshire. He was a right-handed batsman and bowl off breaks. His limited overs high score was 111 versus Warwickshire at Northampton in 2008, while his first-class high score is 277 versus Gloucester at Northampton, which holds the record for the highest maiden century in the United Kingdom including 107 before lunch on the first day. During the same innings, he set the club's record first wicket partnership of 375 with Mark Powell. His nickname amongst teammates is 'Toff', whilst a 'player profile' set up for a televised Twenty20 match listed his 'favourite food' as 'anything posh' – a joke by team-mates. His brother-in-law, Ryan Cummins, has also played for Northamptonshire.

In July 2012, it was announced that White would be leaving the Northamptonshire club at the season end.
