= Sam Grant =

English cricketer (born 1995)

Personal information
- Full name: Samuel Edward Grant
- Born: 30 August 1995 (age 31); Shoreham-by-Sea, Sussex, England
- Batting: Left-handed
- Bowling: Left-arm medium-fast

Domestic team information
- Years: Team
- 2014–2016: Loughborough MCCU

Career statistics
Competition	First-class
Matches	4
Runs scored	66
Batting average	33.00
100s/50s	–/1
Top score	52
Balls bowled	469
Wickets	1
Bowling average	401.00
5 wickets in innings	–
10 wickets in match	–
Best bowling	1/42
Catches/stumpings	–/–
- Source: Cricinfo, 6 August 2020

Samuel Edward Grant (born 30 August 1995) is an English former first-class cricketer.

Grant was born at Shoreham-by-Sea in August 1995. He was educated at Brighton College, before going up to Loughborough University. While studying at Loughborough, he made four appearances in first-class cricket for Loughborough MCCU from 2014 to 2016. He scored 66 runs in his four matches at an average of 33.00, with a high score of 50 against Kent in 2016. An expensive left-arm medium-fast bowler, Grant has a first-class economy rate of 5.13 from 78 overs bowled, in which he took a single wicket while conceding a total of 401 runs.
