= Phil Hayes =

English cricketer and businessman

Personal information
- Full name: Phillip Lee Hayes
- Born: 17 May 1986 (age 40); Bolton, Greater Manchester, England
- Height: 5 ft 11 in (1.80 m)
- Batting: Left-handed
- Bowling: Leg break

Domestic team information
- Years: Team
- 2009: Loughborough UCCE

Career statistics
Competition	First-class
Matches	2
Runs scored	38
Batting average	38.00
100s/50s	–/–
Top score	38
Balls bowled	–
Wickets	–
Bowling average	–
5 wickets in innings	–
10 wickets in match	–
Best bowling	–
Catches/stumpings	–/–
- Source: Cricinfo, 16 August 2011

Phillip Lee Hayes (born 17 May 1986) is a former English cricketer and current co-founder and CEO of Kloodle. Hayes is a left-handed batsman who bowls leg break. He was born in Bolton, Greater Manchester and educated at Bury College.

While studying for his degree at Loughborough University, Hayes made his first-class debut for Loughborough UCCE against Leicestershire in 2009. He made a further appearance for the team in 2009, against Kent. In his two first-class matches, he batted once, scoring 38 runs in the match against Leicestershire.

Phillip is co-founder of Kloodle, a social network for graduate recruitment.
