= Daniel Pratt (cricketer) =

English cricketer

Personal information
- Full name: Daniel Matthew Pratt
- Born: 31 January 1986 (age 40); Croydon, Surrey, England
- Batting: Right-handed
- Role: Wicket-keeper

Domestic team information
- Years: Team
- 2008: Loughborough UCCE

Career statistics
Competition	First-class
Matches	3
Runs scored	52
Batting average	26.00
100s/50s	–/–
Top score	47
Balls bowled	–
Wickets	–
Bowling average	–
5 wickets in innings	–
10 wickets in match	–
Best bowling	–
Catches/stumpings	2/1
- Source: Cricinfo, 16 August 2011

Daniel Matthew Pratt (born 31 January 1986) is an English cricketer. Pratt is a right-handed batsman who fields as a wicket-keeper. He was born in Croydon, Surrey.

While studying for his degree at Loughborough University, Pratt made his first-class debut for Loughborough UCCE against Surrey in 2008. He made two further first-class appearances in 2008, against Gloucestershire and Worcestershire. In his three first-class matches, he scored 52 runs at an average of 26.00, with a high score of 47. Behind the stumps he took 2 catches and made a single stumping.
