= Loughborough MCC University =

- The main academy building

Team information
- Founded: 2003
- Home ground: Haslegrave Ground

History
- First-class debut: Somerset in 2003 at Taunton
- Official website: Loughborough MCCU

Loughborough MCC University (previously known as Loughborough University Centre of Cricketing Excellence) is a cricket coaching centre based at Loughborough University in Loughborough, Leicestershire, England, and the name under which the university's cricket team plays.

The former Loughborough University Centre of Cricketing Excellence played 27 first-class matches from 2001 to 2009. As Loughborough Marylebone Cricket Club University, the team has played fourteen first-class matches from 2010 to 2015.

== About ==
The coaching centre is largely funded by the Marylebone Cricket Club (MCC). It is also the location of England's National Cricket Academy and is frequently used by the England team as a training base.

Loughborough MCCU are one of six MCCU teams in Britain, and were considered first-class when playing against other first-class sides between 2003 and 2020. This meant that a game against another university would not be considered first class; one against a county side which holds first-class status would. The cricket coaching was overseen by assistant coach and former Test opening bowler Graham Dilley being Loughborough's head coach, until his death in 2011, in charge of the technical programme. He was assisted by coaching support which has recently included Nottinghamshire’s Paul Johnson (batting) and Chris Read (wicket-keeping). Dilley was assisted by: a director of cricket for development monitoring and academic mentoring; a fitness advisor experienced with both county clubs and ECB; a sports psychologist; a physiotherapist working with the squad on physical screening, injury prevention regimes and remedial treatment; and a range of additional generic sports science and sports medicine back-up on the Loughborough campus.

Since obtaining first-class status in 2003, the university has produced a large number of cricketers who have obtained professional county contracts, while others such as Monty Panesar have gone on to play international cricket.

== Facilities ==
On-campus facilities include:

- Two first-class standard cricket grounds
- Full run-up indoor nets
- Grass and artificial outdoor net provision
- Access to the university's strength and conditioning and aerobic fitness centres
- Facilities for technical analysis, and integrated cross-training
