= List of Surrey County Cricket Club players =

This is a list in alphabetical order of male cricketers who have played for Surrey County Cricket Club in top-class matches since it was founded in 1845. The club is one of the first-class counties competing in the County Championship and its matches are classified as first-class cricket. It has been classified as a List A team since the beginning of limited overs cricket in 1963 and classified as a top-level Twenty20 team since the inauguration of the Twenty20 Cup in 2003.

The details are the player's usual name followed by the years in which he was active as a Surrey player and then his name as would appear on modern match scorecards. Note that many players represented other top-class teams besides Surrey. Current players are shown as active to the latest season in which they played for the club.

The list does not include Surrey women cricketers, and excludes Second XI and other players who did not play for the club's first team and players whose first team appearances were in minor matches only.

== Key ==
- † preceding a player's name means that the original article is now a redirect to this list.

== A ==
- Sean Abbott (2021, 2023) : S. A. Abbott
- William Abbott (1877) : W. Abbott
- Abdul Razzaq (2008) : Abdul Razzaq
- Bobby Abel (1881–1904) : R. Abel
- Tom Abel (1919–1920) : T. E. Abel
- William Abel (1909–1926) : W. J. Abel
- Donald Adams (1902) : D. Adams
- Henry Adams (1887–1889) : H. J. Adams
- Usman Afzaal (2008–2010) : Usman Afzaal
- Bayly Akroyd (1872–1873) : B. N. Akroyd
- Swainson Akroyd (1869–1878) : S. H. Akroyd
- George Alexander (1869) : G. C. Alexander
- Rehan Alikhan (1989–1993) : R. I. Alikhan
- Anthony Allom (1960) : A. T. C. Allom
- Maurice Allom (1927–1937) : M. J. C. Allom
- Harry Altham (1908–1912) : H. S. Altham
- Rupesh Amin (1997–2002) : R. M. Amin
- Hashim Amla (2013–2014, 2020-2022) : H. M. Amla
- Zafar Ansari (2010–2017) : Zafar Ansari or Z. S. Ansari
- Walter Anstead (1870–1872) : W. H. Anstead
- James Anyon (2009) : J. E. Anyon
- Geoff Arnold (1963–1989) : G. G. Arnold
- David Ashby (1874) : D. A. Ashby
- Ravichandran Ashwin (2021) : Ravichandran Ashwin
- Paul Atkins (1988–1993) : P. D. Atkins
- Gus Atkinson (2020-2023) : A. A. P. Atkinson
- Henry Avory (1876) : H. K. Avory
- Christopher Aworth (1974–1976) : C. J. Aworth
- George Ayres (1892–1896) : G. W. Ayres
- Azhar Mahmood (2002–2015) : Azhar Mahmood

== B ==
- Thomas Baggallay (1865–1874) : T. W. Baggallay or T. W. Weeding
- Robert Baily (1904–1906) : R. E. H. Baily
- Herbert Bainbridge (1883–1885) : H. W. Bainbridge
- Albert Baker (1900–1907) : A. Baker
- Raymond Baker (1973–1978) : R. P. Baker
- William Baker (1847–1851) : W. D. Baker
- Charles Baldwin (1892–1898) : C. Baldwin
- Herbert Baldwin (1922–1930) : H. G. Baldwin
- Ernest Bale (1904) : E. W. Bale
- Kenneth Barker (1899–1903) : K. E. M. Barker
- William Barker (1882) : W. Barker
- Tom Barling (1927–1948) : H. T. Barling
- Woolf Barnato (1928–1930) : J. W. Barnato
- Alex Barnett (1995) : A. A. Barnett
- Ted Barratt (1876–1885) : E. D. Barratt
- Ken Barrington (1953–1968) : K. F. Barrington
- Hugh Bartlett (1933–1935) : H. T. Bartlett
- Michael Barton (1948–1954) : M. R. Barton
- Arthur Batchelar (1862) : A. Batchelar (Note: Batchelar played twice for Surrey in 1862, taking a single wicket and scoring 11 runs in matches against Kent and Yorkshire. Born at Brockham in 1831, he died in the village in 1912 aged 80.)
- Gareth Batty (1998–2001, 2010–2021) : G. J. Batty
- Jonathan Batty (1997–2009) : J. N. Batty
- Robert Bayford (1860–1861) : R. A. Bayford
- John Bayley (1846–1847) : J. Bayley
- Morton Bayley (1866) : M. Bayley
- Thomas Beard (1857–1858) : T. A. Beard
- John Beauchamp (1854–1855) : J. Beauchamp
- John Beaumont (1885–1890) : J. Beaumont
- Luke Beaven (2014) : L. E. Beaven
- Alec Bedser (1939–1960) : A. V. Bedser
- Eric Bedser (1939–1961) : E. A. Bedser
- Michael Bell (1998) : M. A. V. Bell
- Roland Bell (1876) : R. Bell
- Joey Benjamin (1992–1999) : J. E. Benjamin
- Tris Bennett (1922) : C. T. Bennett
- Nigel Harvie Bennett (1946) : N. H. Bennett
- James Benning (2002–2009) : J. G. E. Benning
- Edwin Berrington (1872) : E. H. Berrington
- Fred Berry (1934–1939) : F. Berry
- Zubin Bharucha (1995) : Z. M. Bharucha
- John Bickley (1852) : J. Bickley
- Darren Bicknell (1987–1999) : D. J. Bicknell
- Martin Bicknell (1986–2006) : M. P. Bicknell
- Alfred Bigwood (1878) : A. Bigwood
- Morice Bird (1909–1921) : M. C. Bird
- Francis Birley (1879) : F. H. Birley
- Ian Bishop (1999–2000) : I. E. Bishop
- Henry Blacklidge (1908–1913) : H. G. Blacklidge
- Arthur Blackman (1878) : A. Blackman
- Emmanuel Blamires (1878–1881) : E. Blamires
- Greg Blewett (2004) : G. S. Blewett
- Spencer Block (1928–1933) : S. A. Block
- Horace Bloomfield (1921–1922) : H. O. Bloomfield
- Alfred Boardman (1878–1880) : A. J. Boardman
- James Boiling (1988–1994) : J. Boiling
- Scott Borthwick (2017–2020) : S. G. Borthwick
- Farrington Boult (1872–1873) : F. H. Boult
- St John Boultbee (1867) : S. Boultbee
- Monty Bowden (1883–1888) : M. P. Bowden
- Thomas Bowley (1885–1891) : T. Bowley
- Thomas Box (1849) : T. Box
- Len Braund (1896–1898) : L. C. Braund
- Edward Bray (1870–1878) : E. Bray
- Alan Brazier (1948–1954) : A. F. Brazier
- John Bridges (1876) : J. H. Bridges
- John Bristow (1867–1873) : J. Bristow
- George Brockwell (1846–1857) : G. Brockwell
- Bill Brockwell (1886–1903) : W. Brockwell
- Ted Brooks (1925–1939) : E. W. J. Brooks
- Richard Brooks (1889) : R. Brooks
- Ali Brown (1990–2008) : A. D. Brown
- Freddie Brown (1931–1948) : F. R. Brown
- Graham Brown (1986–1988) : G. E. Brown
- Michael Brown (2009–2011) : M. J. Brown
- Thomas Brown (1868–1874) : T. Brown
- James Bryant (1852) : J. M. Bryant
- Rudi Bryson (1992) : R. E. Bryson
- Frederick Buckle (1867–1872) : F. Buckle
- Harry Budgen (1904–1909) : H. Budgen
- Chris Bullen (1982–1991) : C. K. Bullen
- Burnett Bullock (1922–1924) : B. W. Bullock
- Arthur Burbidge (1857) : A. Burbidge
- Frederick Burbidge (1854–1866) : F. Burbidge
- James Burke (2015–2016) : J. E. Burke
- Charles Burls (1873–1880) : C. W. Burls
- John Burnett (1862) : J. D. Burnett
- Rory Burns (2011–2023) : R. J. Burns
- Montagu Brocas Burrows (1921) : M. B. Burrows
- Henry Burton (1904) : H. H. Burton
- Frederick Bush (1879–1885) : F. W. Bush
- Harry Bush (1901–1912) : H. S. Bush
- Robert Bush (1864–1868) : R. T. Bush
- Robert Bushell (1857–1858) : R. H. Bushell
- Sydney Busher (1908) : S. E. Busher
- Clarence Buss (1934) : C. H. H. Buss
- Alan Butcher (1971–1998) : A. R. Butcher
- Douglas Butcher (1900–1913) : D. H. Butcher
- Gary Butcher (1999–2002) : G. P. Butcher
- Mark Butcher (1991–2009) : M. A. Butcher
- Martin Butcher (1982) : M. S. Butcher

== C ==
- Frederick Caesar (1859–1862) : F. B. Caesar
- Julius Caesar (1849–1867) : J. Caesar
- Bill Caesar (1922) : W. C. Caesar
- James Caffarey (1881–1882) : J. Caffarey
- William Caffyn (1849–1873) : W. Caffyn
- Charles Calvert (1868) : C. Calvert
- Gerald Campbell (1912) : G. V. Campbell
- Ion Campbell (1910–1927) : I. P. F. Campbell
- Michael Carberry (2001–2002) : M. A. Carberry
- John Carmichael (1876–1881) : J. Carmichael
- William Carter (1871–1874) : W. J. Carter
- George Carver (1907) : G. J. Carver
- Arthur Cattley (1882–1884) : A. C. Cattley
- Stephen Cattley (1879–1883) : S. W. Cattley
- Allen Chandler (1873–1877) : A. Chandler
- William Charman (1875) : W. Charman
- Giles Cheatle (1980–1983) : R. G. L. Cheatle
- Steven Cheetham (2010) : S. P. Cheetham
- Charles Chenery (1872–1873) : C. J. Chenery
- Arthur Chester (1872–1883) : A. Chester
- James Chester (1846–1858) : J. Chester
- Esmé Chinnery (1906) : E. F. Chinnery
- Harry Chinnery (1897–1904) : H. B. Chinnery
- Alfred Christy (1857) : A. Christy
- Jordan Clark (2019–2023) : J. Clark
- Tom Clark (1947–1959) : T. H. Clark
- Alfred Clarke (1890–1892) : A. F. Clarke (Note: A wicket-keeper who played for Mitcham Cricket Club, Clarke made eight first-class appearances for Surrey between 1890 and 1892. He scored total of 61 runs. He also played for Surrey Second XI, Guy's Hospital and the Gentlemen of Surrey in non-first-class matches. Born at Farnworth in Lancashire in 1865, he died at Hastings in 1935 aged 69.)
- Charles Clarke (1873–1882) : C. F. C. Clarke
- Morice Clarke (1875–1880) : M. C. Clarke
- Rikki Clarke (2001–2007, 2017–2021) : R. Clarke
- Sylvester Clarke (1979–1989) : S. T. Clarke
- William Clarke (1852) : W. Clarke
- George Clifford (1871–1878) : G. Clifford
- Grahame Clinton (1979–1990) : G. S. Clinton
- Richard Clinton (2004–2008) : R. S. Clinton
- Harry Clode (1899–1903) : H. P. Clode
- William Collett (1869–1874) : W. E. Collett
- Pedro Collins (2008–2009) : P. T. Collins
- William Collyer (1866–1869) : W. J. Collyer
- Stanley Colman (1882) : S. Colman
- Charles Coltson (1847–1851) : C. Coltson
- George Comber (1880–1885) : G. Comber
- Robert Comber (1851) : R. H. Comber
- Bernie Constable (1939–1964) : B. Constable
- William Cook (1921–1933) : W. T. Cook
- Sydney Cooper (1936) : S. H. Cooper
- Nick Cosh (1969) : N. J. Cosh
- Darren Cousins (1999) : D. M. Cousins
- John Cowderoy (1876) : J. Cowderoy
- Dennis Cox (1949–1957) : D. F. Cox
- Jack Crawford (1904–1921) : J. N. Crawford
- Vivian Crawford (1896–1902) : V. F. S. Crawford
- Henry Crouch (1946) : H. R. Crouch
- Cameron Cuffy (1994) : C. E. Cuffy
- Charles Cumberlege (1872) : C. F. Cumberlege
- Jim Cumbes (1968–1970) : J. Cumbes
- Anderson Cummins (1995) : A. C. Cummins
- Sam Curran (2015–2023) : S. M. Curran
- Tom Curran (2013–2023) : T. K. Curran
- Ian Curtis (1983–1984) : I. J. Curtis
- Wilfred Curwen (1909) : W. J. H. Curwen
- John Cuthbertson (1963) : J. L. Cuthbertson

== D ==
- Charles Daily (1923–1929) : C. E. Daily
- John Daley (1936–1938) : J. V. Daley
- Harry Primrose, 6th Earl of Rosebery (1903–1908) : Lord Dalmeny
- Alec Davies (1985) : A. G. Davies
- Steven Davies (2010–2016) : S. M. Davies
- James Davis (1850) : J. Davis
- William Davis (1903–1911) : W. E. Davis
- Daniel Day (1846–1852) : D. Day
- William Deane (1880) : M. W. Deane
- Theunis de Bruyn (2018) : T. B. de Bruyn
- Zander de Bruyn (2011–2013) : Z. de Bruyn
- Jason de la Peña (1994–1995) : J. M. de la Pêna
- Jade Dernbach (2003–2019) : J. W. Dernbach
- William Dible (1882) : W. G. Dible
- Patrick Dickinson (1939) : P. J. Dickinson
- Tillakaratne Dilshan (2014) : T. M. Dilshan
- Edwin Diver (1883–1886) : E. J. Diver
- Hugh Dolbey (1899–1902) : H. O. Dolbey
- Nayan Doshi (2004–2007) : N. D. Doshi
- Richard Doughty (1985–1987) : R. J. Doughty
- Archie Douglas (1887) : A. P. Douglas
- Robert Noel Douglas (1890–1891) : R. N. Douglas
- Edward Dowson, sen (1860–1870) : E. Dowson
- Edward Dowson, jun (1900–1903) : E. M. Dowson
- Burrell Driver (1847–1852) : B. N. Driver
- Frank Druce (1895–1897) : N. F. Druce
- Andy Ducat (1906–1931) : A. Ducat
- John Dunn (1881) : J. Dunn
- Matt Dunn (2010–2022) : M. P. Dunn

== E ==
- Guy Earle (1911–1921) : G. F. Earle
- Alfred Earnshaw (1847) : A. Earnshaw
- George Earnshaw (1880) : G. R. B. Earnshaw
- John Edrich (1958–1978) : J. H. Edrich
- Frank Edwards (1909) : F. Edwards
- George Edwards (2011–2013) : G. A. Edwards
- Mike Edwards (1961–1974) : M. J. Edwards
- Richard Eglington (1938) : R. Eglington
- Dean Elgar (2015, 2018–2019) : D. Elgar
- Grant Elliott (2009) : G. D. Elliott
- George Elliott (1875–1880) : G. F. Elliott
- George Estridge (1859–1860) : G. T. Estridge
- Laurie Evans (2009–2010, 2020–2023) : L. J. Evans

== F ==
- Nick Falkner (1984–1987) : N. J. Falkner
- Nicholas Felix (1846–1852) : N. Felix
- Mark Feltham (1983–1992) : M. A. Feltham
- Percy Fender (1914–1935) : P. G. H. Fender
- Stanley Fenley (1924–1929) : S. Fenley
- Felix Fielding (1889) : F. Fielding
- Aaron Finch (2016–2019) : A. J. Finch
- Adam Finch (2020) : A. W. Finch
- Ian Finlay (1965–1967) : I. W. Finlay
- Laurie Fishlock (1931–1952) : L. B. Fishlock
- David Fletcher (1946–1961) : D. G. W. Fletcher
- Luke Fletcher (2015) : L. J. Fletcher
- Ben Foakes (2015–2023) : B. T. Foakes
- Mark Footitt (2016–2017) : M. H. A. Footitt
- Charles Fox (1876) : C. J. M. Fox
- Henry Franklin (1921) : H. W. F. Franklin
- Albert Freeman (1871–1875) : A. Freeman (Note: Born at Croydon in 1844, Freeman was a professional who played 29 times for Surrey and once for the Surrey Club in first-class matches. He took 11 wickets and scored 419 runs between 1871 and 1875. He died at Upper Holloway in 1920 aged 75.)
- Albert J Freeman (1919) : A. J. Freeman
- Alex French (2025-present) : A. M. French
- Mark Frost (1988–1989) : M. Frost
- Robert Frylinck (2008) : R. Frylinck

== G ==
- Frederick Gamble (1933–1935) : F. C. Gamble
- George Gamble (1906) : G. F. Gamble
- William Game (1871–1883) : W. H. Game
- Edward Garland (1846) : E. Garland
- Monty Garland-Wells (1928–1939) : H. M. Garland-Wells
- Albert Geary (1922–1931) : A. C. T. Geary
- Jack Gentry (1922–1923) : J. S. B. Gentry
- David Gibson (1957–1969) : D. Gibson
- Ed Giddins (2001–2002) : E. S. H. Giddins
- Charles Gilbert (1877–1878) : C. A. W. Gilbert
- Francis Gillespie (1913) : F. S. Gillespie
- Arthur Gilligan (1919) : A. E. R. Gilligan
- Edward Goatly (1901–1914) : E. G. Goatly
- Leonard Gooder (1901–1905) : L. M. H. Gooder
- John Gordon (1906–1907) : J. H. Gordon
- Spencer Gore (1874–1875) : S. W. Gore
- Alf Gover (1928–1947) : A. R. Gover
- William Graburn (1894) : W. T. Graburn
- Tony Gray (1985–1990) : A. H. Gray
- W. Green (1883) : W. Green (Note: Green played in a single match for the county in 1883 against Derbyshire, scoring a total of two runs. Other than a surname and initial, no biographical details are known.)
- George Greenfield (1867–1869) : G. P. Greenfield
- Carl Greenidge (1998–2001) : C. G. Greenidge
- John Greenwood (1874) : J. F. Greenwood
- John Gregory (1870–1871) : J. C. Gregory
- Bob Gregory (1925–1947) : R. J. Gregory
- Ian Greig (1987–1992) : I. A. Greig
- Neville Griffin (1963) : N. F. Griffin
- George Griffith (1856–1871) : G. Griffith
- Billy Griffith (1934) : S. C. Griffith
- Robert Groom (1846) : R. Groom
- Thomas Gunn (1863–1869) : T. W. Gunn

== H ==
- J. V. Haden (1882) : J. V. Haden (Note: Haden played in seven first-class matches for Surrey, all in 1882, scoring a total of 42 runs, with a highest score of 22. He is also known to have played for a Colts of England team against MCC and a Surrey Club and Ground team in the same year. Other than a surname and initials, no biographical details are known.)
- George Hadfield (1903–1904) : G. H. Hadfield
- Anthony Hadingham (1932) : A. W. G. Hadingham
- Charles Hall (1868–1873) : C. J. Hall
- John Hall (1958–1962) : J. K. Hall
- Rory Hamilton-Brown (2005–2012) : R. J. Hamilton-Brown
- William Hammersley (1848–1850) : W. J. Hammersley
- Edwin Hanbury (1871) : E. C. Hanbury
- Reginald Hankey (1855–1856) : R. Hankey
- Thomas Hansell (1975–1977) : T. M. G. Hansell
- Harbhajan Singh (2005–2007) : Harbhajan Singh
- Aaron Hardie (2022) : A. M. Hardie
- Arun Harinath (2009–2016, 2018) : A. Harinath
- Roger Harman (1961–1968) : R. Harman
- Leonard Harper (1904) : L. V. Harper
- Ryan Harris (2009) : R. J. Harris
- Stanley Harris (1904) : S. S. Harris
- Henry Harrison (1909–1923) : H. S. Harrison
- Hartley Hartley-Smith (1880) : H. Hartley-Smith
- Edward Hartnell (1853) : E. G. Hartnell
- Frederick Harwood (1851–1865) : F. Harwood
- Ernie Hayes (1896–1919) : E. G. Hayes
- Daniel Hayward senior (1847) : D. Hayward senior
- Tom Hayward (1893–1914) : T. W. Hayward
- John Hearsum (1871) : J. Hearsum (Note: Both of Hearsum's first-class matches were played in 1871 at The Oval. He made his debut against MCC in July and then played against Sussex in August, scoring a total of 43 runs and failing to take a wicket. He was born at Chelsea in 1852 and died at Chelmsford in 1931 aged 78.)
- James Heartfield (1860–1867) : J. H. Heartfield
- John Heath (1846–1854) : J. Heath
- Walter Heath (1919) : W. H. G. Heath
- Robert Henderson (1883–1896) : R. Henderson
- Moisés Henriques (2015) : M. C. Henriques
- Rangana Herath (2009) : H. M. R. K. B. Herath
- William Hillyer (1849) : W. R. Hillyer
- Edmund Hinkly (1848–1853) : E. Hinkly
- Bill Hitch (1907–1925) : J. W. Hitch
- Arthur Hoare (1846–1847) : A. M. Hoare
- Charles Hoare senior (1846–1853) : C. H. Hoare
- Charles Hoare junior (1871–1874) : C. T. Hoare
- Jack Hobbs (1905–1934) : J. B. Hobbs
- Andrew Hodd (2005) : A. J. Hodd
- Lee Hodgson (2008) : L. J. Hodgson
- Fred Holland (1894–1908) : F. C. Holland
- Adam Hollioake (1992–2004) : A. J. Hollioake
- Ben Hollioake (1996–2001) : B. C. Hollioake
- Errol Holmes (1924–1955) : E. R. T. Holmes
- Mike Hooper (1967–1972) : J. M. M. Hooper
- Fraser Hore (1861) : F. S. Hore
- Charles Horner (1882–1886) : C. E. Horner
- Geoff Howarth (1971–1985) : G. P. Howarth
- Leonard Howell (1869–1880) : L. S. Howell
- Miles Howell (1919–1925) : M. Howell
- Reginald Howell (1878–1879) : R. Howell
- Richard Humphrey (1870–1881) : R. Humphrey
- Richard G. Humphrey (1964–1970) : R. G. Humphrey
- Thomas Humphrey (1862–1874) : T. Humphrey
- William Humphrey (1864) : W. Humphrey
- James Hyndson (1927) : J. G. W. Hyndson

== I ==
- Iftikhar Anjum (2010) : Iftikhar Anjum
- Imran Tahir (2019) : Imran Tahir
- Intikhab Alam (1969–1981) : Intikhab Alam

== J ==
- Robin Jackman (1966–1982) : R. D. Jackman
- Will Jacks (2018–2023) : W. G. Jacks
- McIvor Jackson (1903–1907) : M. T. Jackson
- Douglas Jardine (1921–1933) : D. R. Jardine
- Alfred Jeacocke (1920–1934) : A. Jeacocke
- Richard Jefferson (1961–1966) : R. I. Jefferson
- Tom Jennings (1921–1924) : T. S. Jennings
- Digby Jephson (1894–1904) : D. L. A. Jephson
- Trevor Jesty (1985–1987) : T. E. Jesty
- Tom Jewell (2008–2013) : T. M. Jewell
- Frederick Johnson (1878–1883) : F. Johnson
- George Jones (1875–1888) : G. G. Jones
- Chris Jordan (2007–2012) : C. J. Jordan
- Peter Judd (1960) : P. Judd
- Brendon Julian (1996) : B. P. Julian
- Harry Jupp (1862–1881) : H. Jupp
- William Jupp (1876) : W. T. Jupp

== K ==
- Aneesh Kapil (2014–2015) : A. Kapil
- Murali Kartik (2012) : M. Kartik
- Gary Keedy (2013) : G. Keedy
- John Keene (1897) : J. W. Keene
- Harry Kelleher (1955) : H. R. A. Kelleher
- Owen Kember (1962–1963) : O. D. Kember
- Neil Kendrick (1988–1994) : N. M. Kendrick
- Mark Kenlock (1994–1996) : S. G. Kenlock
- Gregor Kennis (1994–1997) : G. J. Kennis
- Jarvis Kenrick (1876) : J. Kenrick
- Graham Kersey (1993–1996) : G. J. Kersey
- Tom Kersley (1899) : T. Kersley
- Kingsmill Key (1882–1904) : K. J. Key
- William Killick (1876) : W. Killick
- Kenneth King (1936–1938) : K. C. W. King
- Percival King (1871) : P. King
- Simon King (2009–2011) : S. J. King
- Robert Kingsford (1872–1874) : R. K. Kingsford
- Geoffrey Kirby (1948–1953) : G. N. G. Kirby
- Ernest Kirk (1906–1921) : E. C. Kirk
- Donald Knight (1911–1937) : D. J. Knight
- Roger Knight (1968–1984) : R. D. V. Knight
- James Knott (1995–1998) : J. A. Knott
- Frank Knox (1899–1902) : F. P. Knox
- Neville Knox (1904–1910) : N. A. Knox
- Anil Kumble (2006) : A. Kumble

== L ==
- Reginald Lagden (1912) : R. B. Lagden
- Jim Laker (1946–1959) : J. C. Laker
- Tom Lancefield (2009–2011) : T. J. Lancefield
- C. G. Lane (1856–1861) : C. G. Lane
- William Lane (1868–1870) : W. W. C. Lane
- Tom Latham (2023) : T. W. M. Latham
- Tom Lawes (2022-2023) : T. E. Lawes
- Charles Lawrence (1854–1857) : C. Lawrence
- Herbert Leaf (1877) : H. Leaf
- Frederick Lee (1861–1862) : F. Lee
- John Lee (1847–1850) : J. M. Lee
- Walter Lees (1896–1911) : W. S. Lees
- H. D. G. Leveson Gower (1895–1920) : H. D. G. Leveson-Gower
- Chris Lewis (1996–2008) : C. C. Lewis
- Jon Lewis (2012–2013) : J. Lewis
- Roy Lewis (1968–1973) : R. M. Lewis
- David Ligertwood (1992) : D. G. C. Ligertwood
- William Lindsay (1876–1882) : W. Lindsay
- Tim Linley (2009–2015) : T. E. Linley
- Peter Loader (1951–1963) : P. J. Loader
- Tony Lock (1946–1963) : G. A. R. Lock
- Bert Lock (1926–1932) : H. C. Lock
- Norman Lock (1934) : N. W. Lock
- John Lockton (1919–1926) : J. H. Lockton
- Bill Lockwood (1889–1904) : W. H. Lockwood
- Tom Lockyer (1849–1866) : T. Lockyer
- Richard Logan (2009) : R. J. Logan
- George Lohmann (1884–1896) : G. A. Lohmann
- Arnold Long (1960–1975) : A. Long
- Robert Long (1870) : R. Long
- Henry Longman (1901–1908) : H. K. Longman
- Ronald Lowe (1923) : R. F. Lowe
- George Lowles (1887) : G. W. Lowles
- Arthur Lucas (1874) : A. C. Lucas
- A. P. Lucas (1874–1882) : A. P. Lucas
- Alfred Luff (1867) : A. Luff
- Edward Lutterlock (1874) : E. Lutterlock
- Monte Lynch (1977–1994) : M. A. Lynch
- Godfrey Lyons (1880) : G. L. Lyons
- Lewis Lywood (1927–1928) : L. W. Lywood

== M ==
- Reginald Machin (1927–1930) : R. S. Machin
- Andy Mack (1975–1977) : A. J. Mack
- Kevin Mackintosh (1981–1983) : K. S. Mackintosh
- Steve Magoffin (2007) : S. J. Magoffin
- Nick Majendie (1963) : N. L. Majendie
- Dennis Marriott (1965–1967) : D. A. Marriott
- Alan Marshal (1907–1910) : A. Marshal
- Alexander Marshall (1849–1857) : A. Marshall
- Charles Marshall (1893–1899) : C. Marshall
- Henry Marshall (1853–1854) : H. Marshall
- William Marten (1871–1872) : W. G. Marten
- Will Martingell (1846–1859) : W. Martingell
- Frederick Mathews (1883) : F. J. Mathews
- Glenn Maxwell (2013) : G. J. Maxwell
- Peter May (1950–1963) : P. B. H. May
- Percy May (1902–1909) : P. R. May
- Tom Maynard (2011–2012) : T. L. Maynard
- Henry Mayo (1868–1870) : H. E. Mayo
- Christopher Mays (1987–1988) : C. S. Mays
- Maurice McCanlis (1926–1927) : M. A. McCanlis
- Harold McDonell (1901–1904) : H. C. McDonell
- Kenneth McEntyre (1965–1966) : K. B. McEntyre
- Arthur McIntyre (1938–1963) : A. J. W. McIntyre
- Patrick McKelvey (1959–1960) : P. G. McKelvey
- Conor McKerr (2017–2019) : C. McKerr
- John McMahon (1947–1953) : J. W. J. McMahon
- Thomas McMurray (1933–1939) : T. McMurray
- Edward McNiven (1851) : E. McNiven
- James Meads (1905) : J. W. Meads
- Stuart Meaker (2008–2019) : S. C. Meaker
- Keith Medlycott (1984–1991) : K. T. Medlycott
- John Merrall (1932–1933) : J. E. Merrall
- Charles Meymott (1847) : C. Meymott
- Daniel Miller (2002) : D. J. Miller
- Frederick Miller (1851–1867) : F. P. Miller
- Neville Miller (1899–1903) : N. Miller
- Charles Mills (1888) : C. H. Mills
- Edwin Mills (1885–1887) : E. Mills
- Gerald Mobey (1930–1948) : G. S. Mobey
- Mohammad Akram (2005–2007) : Mohammad Akram
- Trevor Molony (1921) : T. J. Molony
- Walter Money (1869) : W. B. Money
- Graham Monkhouse (1981–1986) : G. Monkhouse
- Bill Montgomery (1901–1904) : W. Montgomery
- Charles Morgan (1871) : C. Morgan (Note: Morgan, who was born at Greenwich in 1839, played four first-class matches for Surrey in 1871. A left-arm fast bowler, he made his first-class debut for the Gentlemen of England in 1865 and played club cricket for Richmond, the Civil Service, Streatham and Wimbledon. He had played occasionally for the Gentlemen of Kent and was considered "well-known" in London club cricket. He took a total of four first-class wickets and scored 60 runs. Morgan died at Clapham in 1904 aged 65.)
- Dan Moriarty (2020) : D. T. Moriarty
- Morné Morkel (2018–2020) : M. Morkel
- Norman Morris (1873) : N. Morris
- Will Mortlock (1851–1870) : W. Mortlock
- Philip Morton (1884) : P. H. Morton
- John Moulder (1902–1906) : J. H. Moulder
- William Mudie (1856–1865) : W. Mudie
- Andrew Muggleton (1995) : A. N. Muggleton
- Tony Murphy (1989–1994) : A. J. Murphy
- Chris Murtagh (2005–2009) : C. P. Murtagh
- Tim Murtagh (2000–2006) : T. J. Murtagh
- Murtaza Hussain (2007–2009) : Murtaza Hussain
- Mushtaq Ahmed (2002) : Mushtaq Ahmed
- Edwin Myers (1910–1914) : E. B. Myers

== N ==
- Dirk Nannes (2011–2012) : D. P. Nannes
- Frank Naumann (1919–1921) : F. C. G. Naumann
- Andrew Needham (1977–1986) : A. Needham
- André Nel (2009–2010) : A. Nel
- William Nevell (1939) : W. T. Nevell
- Frederick Newman (1919–1921) : F. C. W. Newman
- Scott Newman (2001–2009) : S. A. Newman
- Stanley Newnham (1932) : S. W. Newnham
- Ernest Nice (1895–1905) : E. H. L. Nice
- Matthew Nicholson (2007–2008) : M. J. Nicholson
- James Nightingale (1868) : J. Nightingale
- Charles Noble (1868) : C. Noble
- John Noble (1866–1869) : J. W. Noble
- Richard Nowell (1995–1996) : R. W. Nowell

== O ==
- Kevin O'Brien (2013–2014) : K. J. O'Brien
- Joseph O'Gorman (1927) : J. G. O'Gorman
- Pragyan Ojha (2011) : P. P. Ojha
- Frederick Oliver (1855–1856) : F. W. Oliver
- James Ormond (2002–2008) : J. Ormond
- Jamie Overton (2020–2023) : J. Overton
- Glyn Owen (1930–1933) : J. G. Owen
- Dudley Owen-Thomas (1970–1979) : D. R. Owen-Thomas

== P ==
- William Palmer (1872–1876) : W. T. Palmer
- James Parfitt (1881–1882) : J. J. A. Parfitt
- Jack Parker (1932–1952) : J. F. Parker
- George Parr (1852) : G. Parr
- Brian Parsons (1958–1963) : A. B. D. Parsons
- Ryan Patel (2017–2020) : R. S. Patel
- Mark Patterson (1996–1999) : M. W. Patterson
- Duncan Pauline (1978–1985) : D. B. Pauline
- Ian Payne (1977–1984) : I. R. Payne
- Alan Peach (1919–1931) : H. A. Peach
- Richard Pearson (1996–1997) : R. M. Pearson
- Alexander Penfold (1929) : A. G. Penfold
- Nick Peters (1988–1989) : N. H. Peters
- Robin Peterson (2014) : R. J. Peterson
- John Peto (1847) : J. Peto
- William Pickering (1846–1848) : W. P. Pickering
- Frederick Pierpoint (1936–1946) : F. G. Pierpoint
- Kevin Pietersen (2010–2015) : K. P. Pietersen
- Julian Piggott (1910–1913) : J. I. Piggott
- Tony Pigott (1994–1996) : A. C. S. Pigott
- Alfred Pilkington (1926) : A. F. Pilkington
- Mathew Pillans (2016–2018) : M. W. Pillans
- George Platt (1906–1914) : G. J. W. Platt
- Liam Plunkett (2019–2020) : L. E. Plunkett
- Pat Pocock (1964–1986) : P. I. Pocock
- Spencer Ponsonby-Fane (1848–1853) : S. C. B. Ponsonby
- Dudley Pontifex (1881) : D. D. Pontifex
- Ricky Ponting (2013) : R. T. Ponting
- Ted Pooley (1861–1883) : E. W. Pooley
- Frederick Pooley (1876–1877) : F. W. Pooley
- Ollie Pope (2017–2023) : O. J. D. Pope
- Stephen Pope (2006) : S. P. Pope
- Joe Porter (2001) : J. J. Porter
- Charles Potter (1869–1871) : C. W. Potter
- Joseph Potter (1875–1881) : J. Potter
- Ernest Powell (1882) : E. O. Powell
- Derek Pratt (1954–1957) : D. E. Pratt
- John Pratt (1868) : J. Pratt
- Ron Pratt (1952–1959) : R. E. C. Pratt
- Harold Pretty (1899) : H. C. Pretty
- Vincent Price (1919) : V. R. Price

== R ==
- Carl Rackemann (1995) : C. G. Rackemann
- Ravi Rampaul (2016–2017) : R. Rampaul
- Mark Ramprakash (2001–2012) : M. R. Ramprakash
- Victor Ransom (1951–1955) : V. J. Ransom
- John Raphael (1903–1909) : J. E. Raphael
- John Ratcliff (1876) : J. Ratcliff
- Alan Ratcliffe (1932–1933) : A. Ratcliffe
- Jason Ratcliffe (1995–2002) : J. D. Ratcliffe
- Frederick Read (1881) : F. H. Read
- Hopper Read (1933) : H. D. Read
- Maurice Read (1880–1895) : J. M. Read
- Walter Read (1873–1897) : W. W. Read
- Gilly Reay (1913–1923) : G. M. Reay
- Louis Redgewell (1922–1923) : L. J. Redgewell
- Edmund Reeves (1848–1852) : E. Reeves
- Charles Reiner (1906) : C. F. Reiner
- Jack Richards (1976–1988) : C. J. Richards
- James Richards (1881) : J. H. Richards
- Harold Richardson (1899) : H. B. Richardson
- Tom Richardson (1892–1904) : T. Richardson
- George Ricketts (1887) : G. W. Ricketts
- Desmond Roberts (1921) : D. Roberts
- Frederick Roberts (1867–1868) : F. Roberts
- Frederick Robertson (1877) : F. M. Robertson
- Jonathan Robinson (1988–1992) : J. D. Robinson
- Andy Robson (1990–1991) : A. G. Robson
- George Rogers (1870) : G. R. Rogers
- Charles Roller (1886) : C. T. Roller
- William Roller (1881–1890) : W. E. Roller
- Graham Roope (1964–1982) : G. R. J. Roope
- Franklyn Rose (2003) : F. A. Rose
- John Rose (1878) : J. Rose
- Paul Roshier (1995) : P. G. Roshier
- Jason Roy (2008–2023) : J. J. Roy
- William Rudd (1904) : W. J. Rudd
- Jacques Rudolph (2012) : J. A. Rudolph
- Tom Rushby (1903–1921) : T. Rushby
- William Rushworth (1946) : W. R. Rushworth
- Stephen Russell (1967) : S. G. Russell
- Arthur Rutty (1910) : A. W. F. Rutty

== S ==
- Zahid Sadiq (1987–1989) : Z. A. Sadiq
- Bill Sadler (1923–1925) : W. C. H. Sadler
- Neil Saker (2003–2008) : N. C. Saker
- Ian Salisbury (1997–2007) : I. D. K. Salisbury
- Philip Sampson (2000–2005) : P. J. Sampson
- Andy Sandham (1911–1937) : A. Sandham
- Kumar Sangakkara (2015–2017) : K. C. Sangakkara
- Saqlain Mushtaq (1997–2008) : Saqlain Mushtaq
- William Sarel (1904–1909) : W. G. M. Sarel
- Neil Sargeant (1989–1995) : N. F. Sargeant
- Chris Schofield (2006–2011) : C. P. Schofield
- Ben Scott (2002–2003) : B. J. M. Scott
- Mike Selvey (1968–1971) : M. W. W. Selvey
- Tom Sewell senior (1846–1849) : T. Sewell senior
- Tom Sewell junior (1859–1868) : T. Sewell junior
- Francis Shadwell (1880) : F. B. Shadwell
- Nadeem Shahid (1995–2004) : N. Shahid
- John Sharpe (1889–1893) : J. W. Sharpe
- Edward Sheffield (1930–1932) : E. J. Sheffield
- Tom Shepherd (1919–1932) : T. F. Shepherd
- William Shepherd (1864–1865) : W. Shepherd
- Robert Sheppard (1904–1905) : R. A. Sheppard
- Tom Sherman (1847–1870) : T. Sherman
- Shoaib Akhtar (2008) : Shoaib Akhtar
- John Shuter (1877–1909) : J. Shuter
- Leonard Shuter (1876–1883) : L. A. Shuter
- Dominic Sibley (2013–2017, 2023) : D. P. Sibley
- Arthur Simmonds (1872–1873) : A. Simmonds
- Edward Skinner (1871–1881) : E. A. Skinner
- Lonsdale Skinner (1971–1977) : L. E. Skinner
- Philip Slater (1911) : P. H. Slater
- Andy Smith (1993–1996) : A. W. Smith
- David Smith (1973–1988) : D. M. Smith
- Edward Smith (1858) : E. Smith
- Frank Smith (1893–1908) : F. E. Smith
- Graeme Smith (2013–2014) : G. C. Smith
- G. O. Smith (1896) : G. O. Smith
- Jamie Smith (2018–2023) : J. L. Smith
- Thomas Smith (1876) : T. Smith (Note: Born in 1854 at Guildford, Smith played in one match for Surrey, an 1876 fixture against Sussex. Nothing more is known regarding his cricket career.)
- Tom Smith (2009) : T. M. J. Smith
- Bill Smith (1961–1970) : W. A. Smith
- Razor Smith (1900–1914) : W. C. Smith
- Frederick Soden (1870–1871) : F. B. Soden
- Vikram Solanki (2013–2015) : V. S. Solanki
- James Southerton (1854–1879) : J. Southerton
- William Spicer (1870) : W. B. Spicer
- Matthew Spriegel (2008–2012) : M. N. W. Spriegel
- Amos Spring (1906–1913) : W. A. Spring
- Stan Squires (1928–1949) : H. S. Squires
- Charles Stacey (1901) : C. F. Stacey
- James Stafford (1864) : J. P. Stafford
- Miles Staveley (1870) : M. Staveley
- Fred Stedman (1899–1908) : F. Stedman
- Cameron Steel (2022-2023) : C.T. Steel
- H. H. Stephenson (1853–1871) : H. H. Stephenson
- John Stevens (1874–1875) : J. Stevens
- Alec Stewart (1981–2003) : A. J. Stewart
- Micky Stewart (1954–1972) : M. J. Stewart
- Tony Stockley (1968) : A. J. Stockley
- Mark Stoneman (2017–2021) : M. D. Stoneman
- Arthur Stoner (1899–1900) : A. H. Stoner
- Stewart Storey (1960–1976) : S. J. Storey
- George Strachan (1872–1880) : G. Strachan
- William Strahan (1846–1849) : W. Strahan
- Edward Streatfeild (1890–1892) : E. C. Streatfeild
- Alfred Street (1892–1898) : A. E. Street
- James Street (1863–1878) : J. Street
- Eric Stroud (1930) : E. G. Stroud
- Bert Strudwick (1902–1927) : H. Strudwick
- Raman Subba Row (1953–1954) : R. Subba Row
- Dennis Sullivan (1914–1921) : D. Sullivan
- Stuart Surridge junior (1978) : S. S. Surridge
- Stuart Surridge (1947–1959) : W. S. Surridge
- John Swan (1870–1876) : J. J. Swan
- Roy Swetman (1954–1961) : R. Swetman
- David Sydenham (1957–1972) : D. A. D. Sydenham
- Ollie Sykes (2024) : O. F. M. Sykes (Note: Sykes has played in five matches, all in 2024. This includes three List A matches, in which he scored a total of 115 runs, one first-class match, and one T20 match.)
- Andrew Symonds (2010) : A. Symonds

== T ==
- Arthur Tabor (1878) : A. S. Tabor
- William Tanner (1866–1868) : W. Tanner
- Andrew Taylor (1865) : A. Taylor
- Derek Taylor (1966–1969) : D. J. S. Taylor
- Edward Taylor (1865–1867) : E. F. Taylor
- James Taylor (2020) : J. P. A. Taylor
- Nick Taylor (1984–1985) : N. S. Taylor
- William Taylor (1852–1855) : W. Taylor
- Dirk Tazelaar (1989) : D. Tazelaar
- Hugh Teesdale (1906–1908) : H. Teesdale
- Caryl Thain (1923) : C. Thain
- David Thomas (1977–1987) : D. J. Thomas
- Adam Thomas (2025–2026) : A. R. G. Thomas
- David Thompson (1994) : D. J. J. Thompson
- Herbert Thompson (1894–1919) : H. Thompson
- Dominic Thornely (2005) : D. J. Thornely
- Graham Thorpe (1988–2005) : G. P. Thorpe
- Charles Tillard (1874–1875) : C. Tillard
- Ron Tindall (1956–1966) : R. A. E. Tindall
- Fred Titmus (1978) : F. J. Titmus
- Matthew Todd (2003) : M. J. Todd
- Don Topley (1985) : T. D. Topley
- Reece Topley (2020) : R. J. W. Topley
- Gareth Townsend (1995) : G. T. J. Townsend
- Chris Tremlett (2010–2015) : C. T. Tremlett
- Thomas Trodd (1879–1880) : T. Trodd
- William Trodd (1869) : W. Trodd
- William Trollope (1877–1882) : W. S. Trollope
- Charles Trouncer (1888) : C. A. Trouncer
- Alex Tudor (1995–2009) : A. J. Tudor
- Neville Tufnell (1922) : N. C. Tufnell

== V ==
- Freddie van den Bergh (2011–2014, 2017–2019) : F. O. E. van den Bergh
- Alan Verrinder (1974–1976) : A. O. C. Verrinder
- Herbert Vigar (1906–1911) : H. E. Vigar
- John Vince (1870) : J. Vince
- John Vincett (1921) : J. H. Vincett
- Amar Virdi (2017–2022) : G. S. Virdi
- Adolph von Ernsthausen (1900–1901) : A. C. E. von Ernsthausen
- Ralph Voss (1883–1886) : R. Voss
- Edmund Vyse (1857) : E. W. Vyse

== W ==
- Owen Wait (1950–1951) : O. J. Wait
- Livingstone Walker (1900–1903) : L. Walker
- Chris Waller (1967–1973) : C. E. Waller
- Clarence Walter (1859) : C. R. Walter
- Stewart Walters (2005–2010) : S. J. Walters
- Waqar Younis (1990–1993) : Waqar Younis
- David Ward (1984–2002) : D. M. Ward
- Ian Ward (1992–2003) : I. J. Ward
- Peter Waterman (1983–1985) : P. A. Waterman
- James Watney junior (1851) : J. Watney
- Eddie Watts (1933–1949) : E. A. Watts
- George Watts (1890–1892) : G. H. Watts
- Thomas Watts (1922–1926) : T. Watts
- Donald Weeks (1933) : D. Weeks
- Evelyn Wellings (1931) : E. M. Wellings
- Cyril Wells (1892–1893) : C. M. Wells
- Peter Westerman (1949–1951) : P. Westerman
- George Whale (1861–1867) : G. Whale
- Garth Wheatley (1947) : G. A. Wheatley
- Alfred Wheeler (1872–1873) : A. Wheeler
- Walter Wheeler (1875) : W. C. Wheeler
- White (1850) : Captain White (Note: Played in one match for Surrey, scoring three runs. Other than a surname and the rank of Captain, no biographical details are known.)
- Alfred White (1881) : A. C. White
- Charles White (1850) : C. White
- Jack White (1926) : J. White
- Edward Whitfield (1930–1939) : E. W. Whitfield
- Robert Whitley (1873) : R. T. Whitley
- Geoff Whittaker (1937–1953) : G. J. Whittaker
- Cyril Wilkinson (1909–1920) : C. T. A. Wilkinson
- Mike Willett (1955–1967) : M. D. Willett
- Henry Willis (1868) : H. Willis
- Bob Willis (1969–1971) : R. G. D. Willis
- Claude Wilson (1881) : C. W. Wilson
- Ernest Wilson (1928–1936) : E. F. Wilson
- Gary Wilson (2008–2016) : G. C. Wilson
- Hugh Wilson (1978–1982) : P. H. L. Wilson
- Edgar Wiltshire (1902–1903) : E. Wiltshire
- † William Wingfield : W. H. Wingfield
- Roger Winlaw (1932–1934) : R. D. K. Winlaw
- Jack Winslade (2014) : J. R. Winslade
- Gary Winterborne (1986) : G. Winterborne
- Daniel Worrall (2022-2023) : D.J. Worrall
- Henry Wood (1884–1900) : H. Wood
- W. Wood (1883) : W. Wood (Note: Wood played in two first-class matches for Surrey in 1883, scoring a total of nine runs and taking one wicket. He is known to have played in two other matches during the same season, including one for Surrey against a Leicestershire team which is not considered first-class. Other than a surname and initial, no biographical details are known.)
- Thomas Woodgate (1877) : T. W. Woodgate
- George Wyatt (1877–1879) : G. N. Wyatt
- † William Wyld (1879–1887) : W. G. Wyld

== Y ==
- Yasir Arafat (2011) : Yasir Arafat
- G. Yates (1851–1854) : G. Yates (Note: Yates played in four first-class matches between 1851 and 1854, two for Surrey XIs and two for the Surrey Club. Other than a surname and initial no biographical details are known.)
- Rex Yeatman (1946–1947) : R. H. Yeatman
- Younis Ahmed (1965–1978) : Younis Ahmed
- Younis Khan (2010) : Younus Khan

== Z ==
- Zaheer Khan (2004) : Zaheer Khan

== See also ==
- List of Surrey cricket captains
