= Albert Freeman =

Albert Freeman can refer to:

- Albert Freeman (cricketer, born 1844) (1844–1920), English cricketer
- Albert Freeman (cricketer, born 1887) (1887–1945), English cricketer
- Albert Freeman (footballer) (1899–?), an English footballer
- Al Freeman Jr. (1934–2012), American actor
- Bert Freeman (1885–1995), English footballer

== See also ==
- Albert Freedman (1922–2017), American television producer
