= Ian Finlay =

Ian Finlay may refer to:

- Ian Finlay (art historian) (1906–1995), Scottish art historian and museum director
- Ian Finlay (cricketer) (born 1946), English cricketer
- Ian Hamilton Finlay (1925–2006), Scottish poet, writer, artist and gardener
