= Cattley =

Cattley is a surname, and may refer to:

- Arthur Cattley (1861–1895), English cricketer
- Henry Cattley (1887–1961), British gymnast
- Stephen Cattley (1860–1925), English cricketer
- William Cattley (1788–1835), British merchant and horticulturist
