= Joseph Pearson (cricketer) =

English cricketer

Personal information
- Full name: Joseph Garside Pearson
- Born: 26 March 1860; Worksop, Nottinghamshire, England
- Died: 18 January 1892 (aged 31); Boughton, Nottinghamshire, England
- Batting: Unknown
- Bowling: Unknown

Domestic team information
- Years: Team
- 1883: Nottinghamshire

Career statistics
Competition	First-class
Matches	1
Runs scored	1
Batting average	1.00
100s/50s	0/0
Top score	1
Balls bowled	13
Wickets	3
Bowling average	0.33
5 wickets in innings	0
10 wickets in match	0
Best bowling	3/1
Catches/stumpings	0/–
- Source: Cricinfo, 3 June 2012

Joseph Garside Pearson (26 March 1860 – 18 January 1892) was an English cricketer. Pearson's batting and bowling styles are unknown. He was born at Worksop, Nottinghamshire.

Pearson made a single first-class appearance for Nottinghamshire against Surrey at The Oval in 1883. Surrey won the toss and elected to bat, making 236 all out in their first-innings. Pearson bowled 3.1 overs toward the end of the innings, taking the wickets of William Roller, Frederick Johnson, and Ted Barratt, conceding just one run off his bowling. Nottinghamshire responded to Surrey's total by posting 405 all out in their first-innings, with Pearson being dismissed for a single run by Barratt. Surrey reached 112/3 in their second-innings, at which point the match was declared a draw. This was his only major appearance for Nottinghamshire.

He died at Boughton, Nottinghamshire, on 18 January 1892.
