= William Spicer =

William Spicer may refer to:

- William Spicer (14th-century MP), MP for Devizes
- William A. Spicer (1865–1952), Seventh-day Adventist minister and president of the General Conference of Seventh-day Adventists
- William C. Spicer (1868–?), American college football player and coach
- William E. Spicer (1929–2004), American engineering academic
- William L. Spicer (1918–1991), American businessman and state chairman of the Arkansas Republican Party
- William Spicer (cricketer) (1846–1892), English cricketer
- William Spicer (Medal of Honor) (1864–1949), gunner's mate in the United States Navy who received the Medal of Honor
- William Spicer (MP for Exeter) (c. 1735–1788), British MP for Exeter, 1767–1768
