= Muggleton =

Muggleton is a surname of English origin. People with the surname include:

- Amanda Muggleton (born 1951), Australian actress
- Andrew Muggleton (born 1974), English cricketer
- Brian Muggleton (1941–2022), Australian cricketer
- Carl Muggleton (born 1968), English footballer
- John Muggleton (born 1960), Australian rugby league player
- Josh Muggleton (born 1989), a participant in the British television series Yeardot
- Lodowicke Muggleton (1609–1698), English religious leader
- Louis Muggleton (1922–2015), South African born British physicist and engineer
- Sam Muggleton (born 1995), English footballer
- Stephen Muggleton (born 1959), British computer scientist
