= Frederick Bush =

English cricketer

Frederick William Bush
Personal information
- Born: 27 February 1852; East Dulwich, Surrey
- Died: 8 January 1937 (aged 84); Bournemouth, Hampshire
- Source: Cricinfo, 12 March 2017

Frederick William Bush (27 February 1852 – 8 January 1937) was an English cricketer. He was educated at Dulwich College.

He played 22 first-class matches for Surrey between 1879 and 1897. He was a county cricketer for Surrey, Suffolk, and Shropshire (for which he appeared at five two day matches during 1904) while playing club cricket for Shrewsbury and Nesscliff.

He was brother of another Surrey County cricketer, Harry Bush.

== See also ==
- List of Surrey County Cricket Club players
