= Majendie =

Majendie (/ˈmædʒəndi/ MAJ-ən-dee) is a surname and may refer to:

- Henry Majendie (1754–1830), English bishop
- James Majendie (1871–1939), British politician
- John James Majendie (1709–1783), Canon of Windsor, 1774-83
- Lewis Majendie (1835–1885), British politician
- Musette Majendie (1903–1981), owner of Hedingham Castle
- Nick Majendie (born 1942), English cricketer
- Vivian Dering Majendie (1836–1898), English bomb disposal expert
- Vivian Majendie (1886–1960), English cricketer and general
