= Ray Baker =

Ray or Raymond Baker may refer to:

- Ray Stannard Baker (1870–1946), American journalist and author
- Ray Baker (record producer), country-western music producer
- Ray Baker (actor) (born 1948), American actor
- Ray Jerome Baker (1880–1972), American photographer, film maker and lecturer
- Raymond T. Baker (1877–1935), Director of the U.S. Mint 1917–22
- Raymond W. Baker (born 1935), American businessman, scholar and author
- Raymond Baker (chemist) (born 1936), former CEO of the BBSRC
- Raymond Baker (cricketer) (born 1954), English cricketer
- Ora Ray Baker (a.k.a. Ameena Begum), wife of Sufi mystic Inayat Khan (1882–1927)
- R. Stan Baker (born 1977), American federal judge
