= Thomas Beard (disambiguation) =

Thomas Beard (died 1632) was an English clergyman and theologian of Puritan views.

Thomas Beard may also refer to:

- Thomas Beard (cricketer) (1817–1903), English first-class cricketer
- Thomas P. Beard (1837–1918), African-American state legislator in Georgia
- Tom Beard (born 1948), American football center
