= Roy Lewis =

Roy Lewis may refer to:

- Roy Lewis (writer) (1913–1996), English writer
- Roy Lewis (American football) (born 1985), American football cornerback
- Roy Lewis (cricketer) (1948–2022), English cricketer
- Roy Lewis (photographer) (born 1937), American photographer
- Roy Lewis Sr., of The Lewis Family, a family of gospel and bluegrass musicians from Lincolnton, Georgia
