= Vigar =

Vigar is a surname. Notable people with the surname include:

- Billy Vigar (2003–2025), English footballer
- Frank Vigar (1917–2004), English cricketer
- Geoff Vigar, British academic
- Herbert Vigar (1883–1946), English cricketer
