= McEntyre =

McEntyre is a surname. Notable people with the surname include:

- Kenneth McEntyre (born 1944), English cricketer
- Kenny McEntyre (born 1970), American football player
- William McEntyre Dye (1831–1899), American soldier

== See also ==
- McIntyre
- McEntyre, Alabama, an unincorporated community
