= Henry Mayo =

Henry Mayo may refer to:

- Henry T. Mayo (1856–1937), admiral of the United States Navy
- Henry Mayo (cricketer) (1847–1891), English cricketer
- Henry Mayo (minister) (1733–1793), English dissenting minister and tutor
