= Matthew Todd =

Matthew Todd may refer to:

- Matthew Todd (cricketer), (born 1983) English cricketer
- Matthew Todd (chemist), (born 1973) British chemist
- Matthew Todd (footballer) (born 2001), Scottish footballer
- Matty Todd (1924–2020), British submariner
- Matthew Todd (writer), British writer
