= George Hadfield =

George Hadfield may refer to:

- George Hadfield (architect) (1763–1826), English architect
- George Hadfield (politician) (1787–1879), English author and politician
- George Hadfield, former bass player for This World Fair
- George Hadfield (cricketer) (1880–1935), English cricketer
