= Neville Miller =

Neville Miller may refer to:

- Neville Miller (politician) (1894–1977), mayor of Louisville, Kentucky
- Neville Miller (footballer) (born 1951), Australian rules footballer
- Neville Miller (cricketer) (1874–1967), English cricketer
