= Umiak =

Skin-covered boat

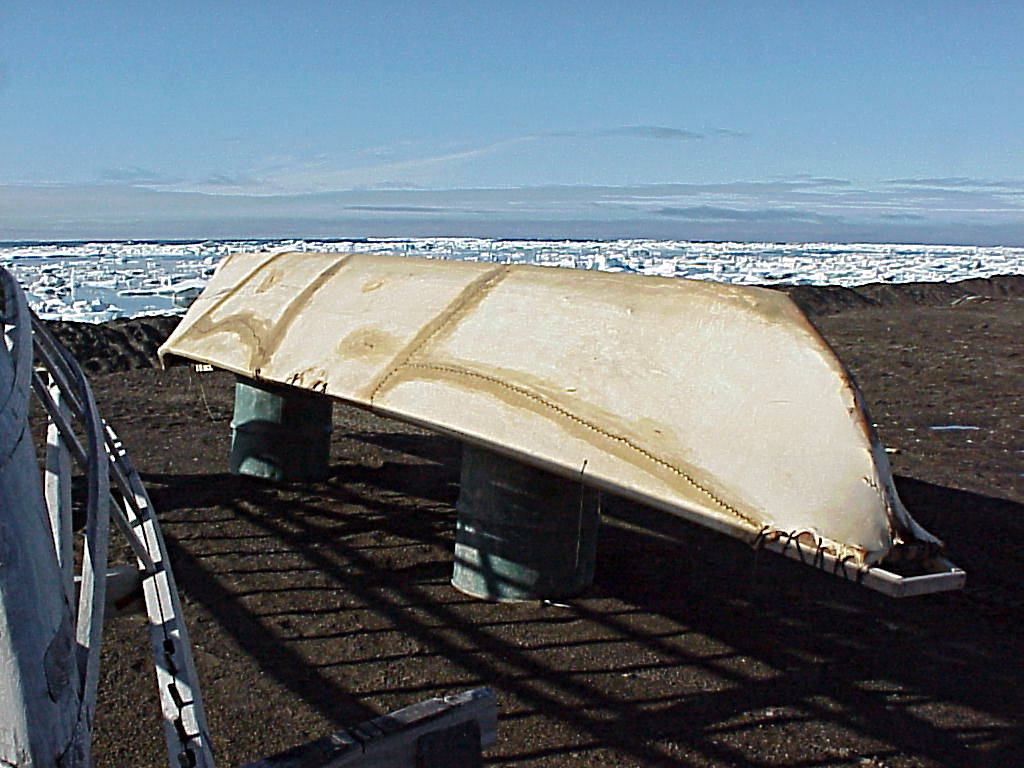
Umiak in Barrow, Alaska

The umiak, umialak, umiaq, umiac, oomiac, oomiak, ongiuk, or anyak is a type of open skin boat, used by the Yupik and Inuit, and was originally found in all coastal areas from Siberia to Greenland. First used in Thule times, it has traditionally been used in summer, for moving people and possessions to seasonal hunting grounds, and for hunting whales and walrus. Although the umiak was usually propelled by oars (women) or paddles (men), sails—sometimes made from seal intestines—were also used, and, in the 20th century, outboard motors. Because the umiak has no keel, the sails cannot be used for tacking.

== Size and construction ==
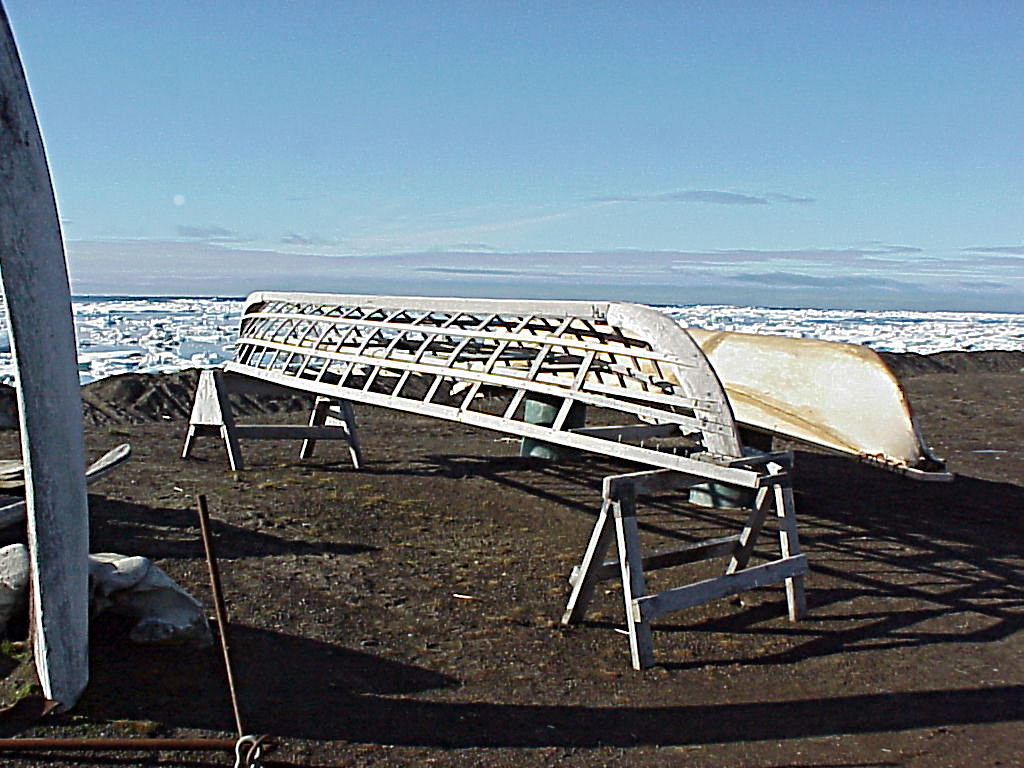
Umiak frame

Like the kayak, the traditional umiak was made from a driftwood or whalebone frame pegged and lashed together, sometimes with antlers or ivory, over which walrus or bearded seal skins are stretched. Oil, usually from seals, would be used to coat and waterproof the seams. A large umiak, 9.1 m (30 ft), would require that about seven skins be sewn together, stretched over the frame and allowed to dry. Modern versions are essentially identical, with the exception of the use of metal bolts and screws.

The open umiak is significantly larger than the enclosed kayak, which was built to carry one or two men while hunting. Normally 9 or 10 m (30 or 33 ft), the umiak could be anywhere from 6 to 10 m (20 to 33 ft) long and 1.5 to 2 m (5 to 7 ft) wide. Hans Egede, a Norwegian-Danish Lutheran missionary to Greenland in 1721, stated that he had seen umiaks 18 m (60 ft) long.

Although an umiak could carry up to 15 passengers, its light weight and lack of a keel allows it to be carried over the drift or shore ice to the open water by a few people. A modern company which trains people to hand make umiaks says that a 7.3 m (24 ft) boat weighs about 68 kg (150 lb) compared to 340 kg (750 lb) for a modern vessel.

== Modern usage ==
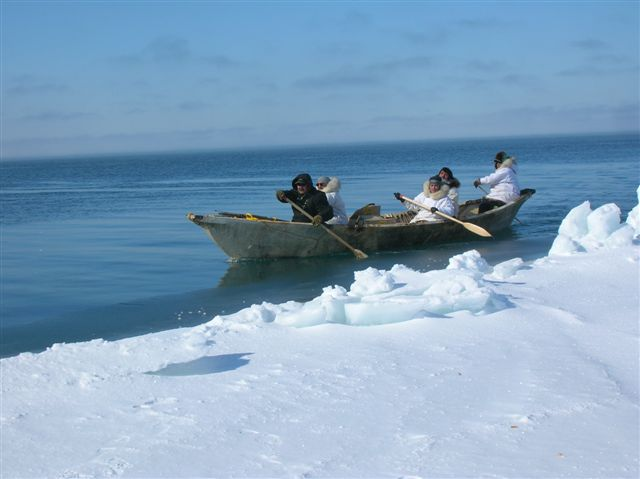
An expedition in Alaska

Although the usage of the umiak and the kayak has died out in most areas of the Arctic it is still very much a part of life in the Yupik and Inupiat whaling villages of Alaska. The boat must be hauled on a sled pulled by snowmobile over very rough trails cut through the ice ridges to locations where there are open leads in the ice pack, where it is used to catch whales.

The skin cover on an umiak will last for two or three years, as does an aluminum boat used in the same way; however, replacing the skin on an umiak is much easier than repairing an aluminum boat. Additionally, the bowhead whale is sensitive to the metallic noise from aluminum boats, and tend to move away under the ice, to avoid them.

In Utqiaġvik, Alaska, the process for replacing the skin of an umiak begins when the ice moves away from the shores of the Arctic Ocean in July. At their first summer access to the ocean, whaling crews hunt for oogruk, the bearded seal, for suitable skins. The skins are packed into seal oil and allowed to ferment while they are stored until March. At that time the skins are scraped free of hair, sewn together with a waterproof stitch, and then stretched over the wooden frame and tied into place using the sinew from caribou.

With a new skin on the frame, the umiak is placed out in the wind and cold, to dry. In May when the bowhead whales migrate eastward past Point Barrow, umiak skin boats are hauled on sleds pulled by snowmobiles out onto the ice.

== Name ==
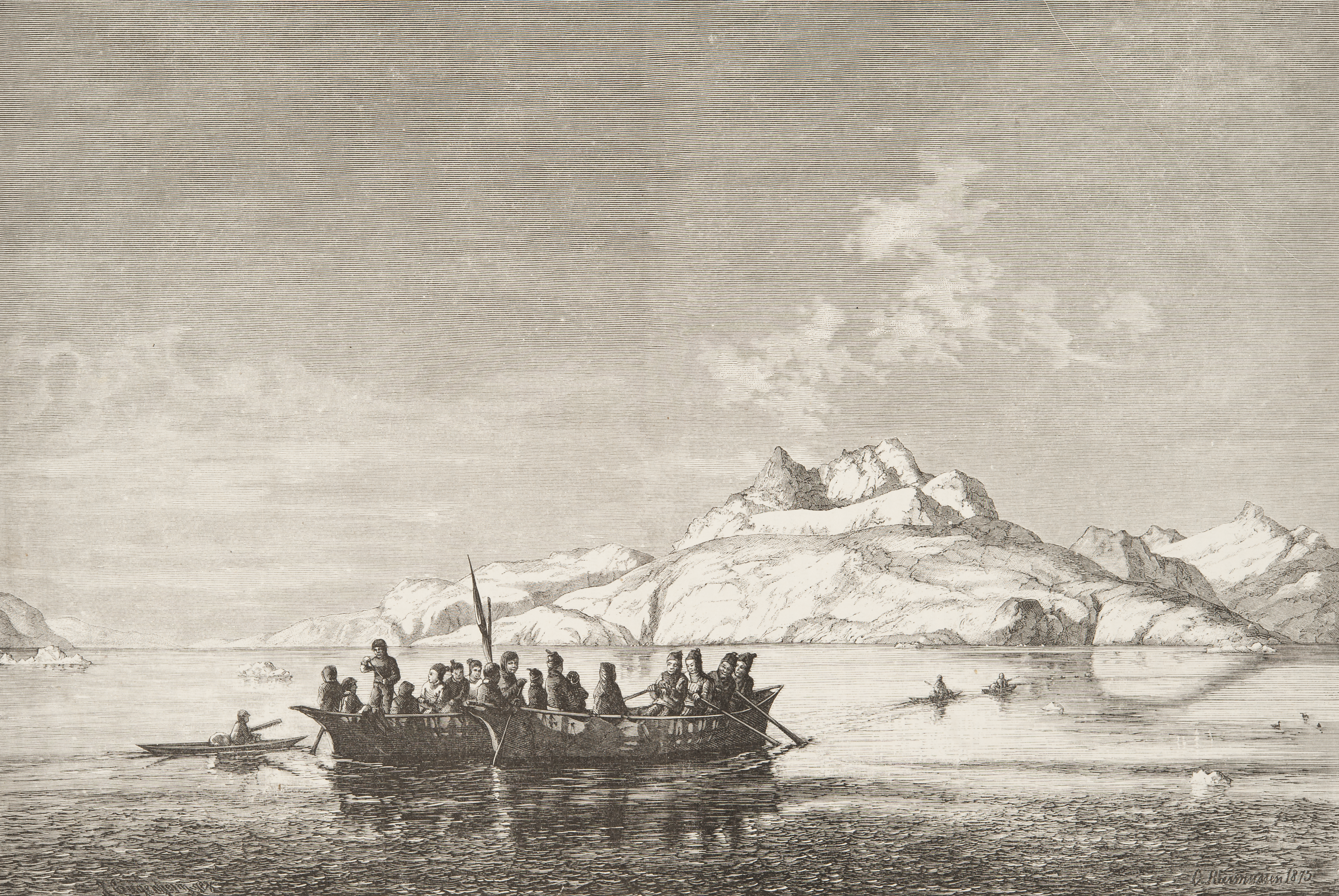
Umiaks being used for transport in Greenland in the summer of 1875, with kayaks travelling alongside.

Although it is sometimes called a "woman's boat", modern Inuit dictionaries such as Kangiryuarmiut Uqauhingita Numiktittitdjutingit by Ronald Lowe, the Inuinnaqtun English Dictionary, and Asuilaak Inuktitut Living Dictionary translate umiak as boat, traditional skin boat, or any type of boat.

In the Eastern Arctic, where the umiak was rarely used for hunting, it was used mainly as summer transport for women and children, while men travelled by kayak, and thus was known as a "woman's boat".

== See also ==
- Sea kayak
- Baidarka
- Wilhelm August Graah
