= George Jones (Surrey cricketer) =

English cricketer

Personal information
- Born: 8 January 1856; Mitcham, Surrey
- Died: 1 April 1936 (aged 80); Watford, Hertfordshire
- Source: Cricinfo, 13 March 2017

George Jones (8 January 1856 – 1 April 1936) was an English cricketer. He played 102 first-class matches for Surrey between 1875 and 1888.

== See also ==
- List of Surrey County Cricket Club players
