= Leonard Gooder =

English cricketer

Personal information
- Born: 11 February 1876; Paddington, London
- Died: 26 November 1928 (aged 52); Kilburn, London
- Source: Cricinfo, 12 March 2017

Leonard Gooder (11 February 1876 – 26 November 1928) was an English cricketer. He played nineteen first-class matches for Surrey between 1901 and 1905.

== See also ==
- List of Surrey County Cricket Club players
