= Kenneth King (cricketer) =

English cricketer

Personal information
- Born: 4 December 1915; Beddington, Surrey
- Died: 5 July 1997 (aged 81); Peterborough
- Source: Cricinfo, 13 March 2017

Kenneth King (4 December 1915 – 5 July 1997) was an English cricketer. He played 32 first-class matches for Surrey between 1936 and 1955.

== See also ==
- List of Surrey County Cricket Club players
