= McIvor Jackson =

English cricketer

Personal information
- Born: 24 May 1880; Merton, Surrey
- Died: 15 June 1936 (aged 56); Southwark, London
- Source: Cricinfo, 13 March 2017

McIvor Jackson (24 May 1880 – 15 June 1936) was an English cricketer. He played eleven first-class matches for Surrey between 1903 and 1907.

== See also ==
- List of Surrey County Cricket Club players
