= Fred Berry (cricketer) =

English cricketer

Personal information
- Full name: Fred Berry
- Born: 13 February 1910; Kirkheaton, Yorkshire
- Died: 2 January 1989 (aged 78); Bracknell, Berkshire
- Batting: Right-handed
- Bowling: Right-arm fast-medium

Domestic team information
- Years: Team
- 1934-1939: Surrey

Career statistics
Competition	FC
Matches	47
Runs scored	1,053
Batting average	19.14
100s/50s	1/4
Top score	104*
Balls bowled	5,283
Wickets	83
Bowling average	28.62
5 wickets in innings	2
10 wickets in match	0
Best bowling	6/81
Catches/stumpings	29/0
- Source: Cricinfo, 12 March 2017

Fred Berry (13 February 1910 – 2 January 1989) was an English cricketer. He played 47 first-class matches for Surrey between 1934 and 1939 as an enterprising lower-order batter and a right-arm medium-fast bowler.

Berry's obituary in Wisden Cricketers' Almanack states that he "was perhaps not always given the chances he needed". He was a heavy scorer and consistent wicket-taker for Surrey's second eleven in the Minor Counties Championship, but only in 1938, when he played 21 first-class matches, was he a regular in the first team.

== See also ==
- List of Surrey County Cricket Club players
