= James Meads =

English cricketer

James Wilford Meads
Personal information
- Born: 28 October 1877; Calverton, Nottinghamshire
- Died: 3 November 1957 (aged 80); Calverton, Nottinghamshire
- Source: Cricinfo, 13 March 2017

James Meads (28 October 1877 – 3 November 1957) was an English cricketer. He played three first-class matches for Surrey in 1905. He played as a bowler (right-arm slow).

== See also ==
- List of Surrey County Cricket Club players
