= William Graburn =

English cricketer

Personal information
- Full name: William Turbett Graburn
- Born: 16 March 1865; Filey, Yorkshire
- Died: 13 December 1944 (aged 79); Kent Town, West Molesey, Surrey
- Batting: Right-handed
- Bowling: Right-arm slow

Domestic team information
- Years: Team
- 1890: Hurst Park
- 1894: Surrey
- Source: Cricinfo, 12 March 2017

William Turbett Graburn (16 March 1865 – 13 December 1944) was an English cricketer and cricket coach. He played two first-class matches between 1890 and 1894.

Born at Filey in Yorkshire, the son of Captain John Grabburn, a former British Army officer who became a solicitor. His father had played cricket at Cheltenham College and for a United Ireland XI whilst serving at Dublin during the 1850s. William Grabburn was educated at Repton School, playing cricket for the school XI during his final year in 1884. He played club cricket for Scarborough, captained Yorkshire Colts sides, and played for the Gentlemen of Yorkshire during the 1880s, scoring a century for Scarborough against the Indian Parsee team which toured England in 1886.

In around 1890, Graburn was appointed to coach young players at Surrey County Cricket Club, taking up one of the first "instructor" roles at a county club. He played club cricket Thames Ditton and was a member of East Molesey Cricket Club. He made his first-class debut for the Hurst Park club against the touring Australians at East Molesey, opening the batting and making scores of 22 and two runs in his two innings.

In his role as instructor, Graburn captained Surrey's Club and Ground and Second XI sides for twenty years. Wisden considered him a "sound bat" who was "'well known" in connection with the county club, and he was considered a "highly respected coach". He made his only appearance for the county's senior side in 1894, captaining the side against Essex at Leyton as the only amateur available. He made 39 runs in his only innings as Essex, in their first season of first-class cricket, were beaten by an innings.

Graburn continued to play club cricket until the outbreak of World War I. He died at East Molesey in 1944, aged 79.
