= Harry Clode =

English cricketer

Personal information
- Born: 7 September 1877; Kensington, London
- Died: 19 October 1964 (aged 87); Sunderland, County Durham
- Source: Cricinfo, 12 March 2017

Harry Clode (7 September 1877 – 19 October 1964) was an English cricketer. He played 40 first-class matches for Surrey between 1899 and 1903.

Clode joined Surrey County Cricket Club at the age of 17 and made his first class debut two years later in 1899. In 1904, he moved to North East England to become the professional at Wearmouth C.C.. Between 1912 and 1921 he played for Durham County and was then appointed by the club as a coach.

After retiring from the professional game, Clode played for Wearmouth as an amateur, serving as captain. He later joined the club's committee as secretary. He was later made an honorary vice-president of the club. Clode's son, also called Harry, was also captain of Wearmouth. Clode's ashes were scattered at the Wearmouth C.C. cricket ground at Carley Hill, Sunderland.

== See also ==
- List of Surrey County Cricket Club players
