= George Comber =

English cricketer and undertaker

Personal information
- Born: 12 October 1856; Redhill, Surrey
- Died: 18 October 1929 (aged 73); Redhill, Surrey
- Batting: Right-handed
- Role: Wicket-keeper

Domestic team information
- Years: Team
- 1880–1885: Surrey
- Source: Cricinfo, 12 March 2017

George Comber (12 October 1856 – 18 October 1929) was an English undertaker and professional cricketer. He played six first-class matches for Surrey County Cricket Club between 1880 and 1885.

Comber was born at Redhill in 1856. His father ran an undertakers business in the town which had been established by Comber's grandfather. Comber later ran the business himself.

As a young man, Comber played club cricket for the Redhill and Reigate Priory clubs, becoming "well-known in local cricketing circles". He was considered a "fine" batsman and wicket-keeper, the Surrey Mirror writing that he had a "penchant" for the position, whilst Wisden described him as "useful both as batsman and wicket-keeper" He played alongside Surrey cricketer Walter Read for Reigate Priory and was recommended to the Surrey club, taking up a position as a professional cricketer with the county side in around 1880.

Comber made six first-class appearances for Surrey. He scored four runs in his only innings on his first-class debut against Middlesex at Lord's in 1880, before playing four matches for the county side during the 1882 season. After a final first-class match in 1885, he retired as a professional cricketer and returned to the family business. In his six first-class matches he scored a total of 44 runs, with a highest score of 19 coming against Kent at Mote Park in 1882. Nis most notable performance as a club cricketer came in the same year, Comber scoring 154 runs for Reigate Priory against Guildford Cricket Club, part of a partnership of 368 for the third wicket with Walter Read.

Following his father's death, Comber took over the family undertakers business. He married in 1883 and died, aged 74, at Redhill in 1929.

== See also ==
- List of Surrey County Cricket Club players
