= Patrick McKelvey =

English cricketer

Personal information
- Born: 25 December 1935 (age 90); Barnet, Hertfordshire
- Source: Cricinfo, 13 March 2017

Patrick McKelvey (born 25 December 1935) is an English cricketer. He played two first-class matches for Surrey between 1959 and 1960.

== See also ==
- List of Surrey County Cricket Club players
