= Frederick Buckle =

English cricketer

Personal information
- Born: 25 September 1849; Thames Ditton, Surrey
- Died: 7 November 1884 (aged 35); Long Ditton, Surrey
- Source: Cricinfo, 12 March 2017

Frederick Buckle (25 September 1849 – 7 November 1884) was an English cricketer. He played fifteen first-class matches for Surrey between 1867 and 1872.

== See also ==
- List of Surrey County Cricket Club players
