= Harry Budgen =

English cricketer

Personal information
- Born: 1 April 1879; Reigate, Surrey
- Died: 13 March 1944 (aged 64); Redhill, Surrey
- Source: Cricinfo, 12 March 2017

Harry Budgen (1 April 1879 – 13 March 1944) was an English cricketer. He played three first-class matches for Surrey between 1904 and 1909.

He died in the Royal Earlswood Institution for Mental Defectives.

== See also ==
- List of Surrey County Cricket Club players
