= William Barker (Surrey cricketer) =

English cricketer

Personal information
- Born: 1857; Manchester, Lancashire
- Died: Unknown
- Source: Cricinfo, 12 March 2017

William Barker (born 1857, date of death unknown) was an English cricketer. He played one first-class match for Surrey in 1882.

== See also ==
- List of Surrey County Cricket Club players
