= William Charman =

English cricketer

Personal information
- Born: 23 September 1850; Epsom, Surrey
- Died: 8 December 1924 (aged 74); Hove, Sussex
- Source: Cricinfo, 12 March 2017

William Charman (23 September 1850 – 8 December 1924) was an English cricketer. He played one first-class match for Surrey in 1875.

== See also ==
- List of Surrey County Cricket Club players
