= Norman Lock =

English cricketer

Personal information
- Born: 13 March 1912; Ham Common, Surrey
- Died: February 1999; Surrey
- Source: Cricinfo, 13 March 2017

Norman Lock (13 March 1912 – February 1999) was an English cricketer. He played one first-class match for Surrey in 1934.

== See also ==
- List of Surrey County Cricket Club players
