= Geoffrey Kirby =

English cricketer

Personal information
- Born: 6 November 1923; Reading, Berkshire
- Died: 7 January 2004 (aged 80); Nettlebed, Oxfordshire
- Source: Cricinfo, 13 March 2017

Geoffrey Kirby (6 November 1923 – 7 January 2004) was an English cricketer. He played 23 first-class matches for Surrey between 1947 and 1953.

== See also ==
- List of Surrey County Cricket Club players
