= Morton Bayley =

English cricketer

Morton Bailey (7 May 1843 – 6 March 1926) was an English cricketer. He was a right-handed batsman and a right-arm medium-pace bowler who played for Surrey. He was born and died in Mitcham.

Bayley made a single first-class appearance, in 1866, against Lancashire. Batting as a tailender, he scored 8 not out in the only innings in which he batted, as the game concluded in a draw.

Bayley's uncle, John, played first-class cricket for Middlesex, Marylebone Cricket Club and Surrey.
