= George Clifford (cricketer) =

English cricketer

Personal information
- Born: 19 April 1852; Barnes, Surrey
- Died: 4 February 1941 (aged 88); Thames Ditton, Surrey
- Source: Cricinfo, 12 March 2017

George Clifford (19 April 1852 – 4 February 1941) was an English cricketer. He played sixteen first-class matches for Surrey between 1871 and 1879.

== See also ==
- List of Surrey County Cricket Club players
