= Thomas Brown (cricketer, born 1845) =

English cricketer

Personal information
- Born: 9 August 1845; Rusper, Sussex
- Source: Cricinfo, 12 March 2017

Thomas Brown (born 9 August 1845, date of death unknown) was an English cricketer. He played nine first-class matches for Surrey between 1868 and 1874.

== See also ==
- List of Surrey County Cricket Club players
