= Hugh Dolbey =

English cricketer

Personal information
- Born: 27 November 1879; Sutton, Surrey
- Died: 14 July 1936 (aged 56); Glemsford, Suffolk
- Source: Cricinfo, 12 March 2017

Hugh Dolbey (27 November 1879 – 14 July 1936) was an English cricketer. He played three first-class matches for Surrey between 1899 and 1902. Below first-class level he also played at county level for Shropshire between 1898 and 1902 while playing at club level for Ludlow.

Born in 1879 at Sutton, Surrey he was educated at Dulwich College and Cranleigh School. He died at Stanstead House, Glemford, Suffolk in 1936 aged 56.

== See also ==
- List of Surrey County Cricket Club players
