= Ernest Kirk =

English cricketer

Personal information
- Born: 21 March 1884; Clapham, London
- Died: 19 December 1932 (aged 48); Fulham, London
- Source: Cricinfo, 13 March 2017

Ernest Kirk (21 March 1884 – 19 December 1932) was an English cricketer. He played 40 first-class matches for Surrey between 1905 and 1921.

== See also ==
- List of Surrey County Cricket Club players
