= Charles Fox (cricketer) =

English cricketer

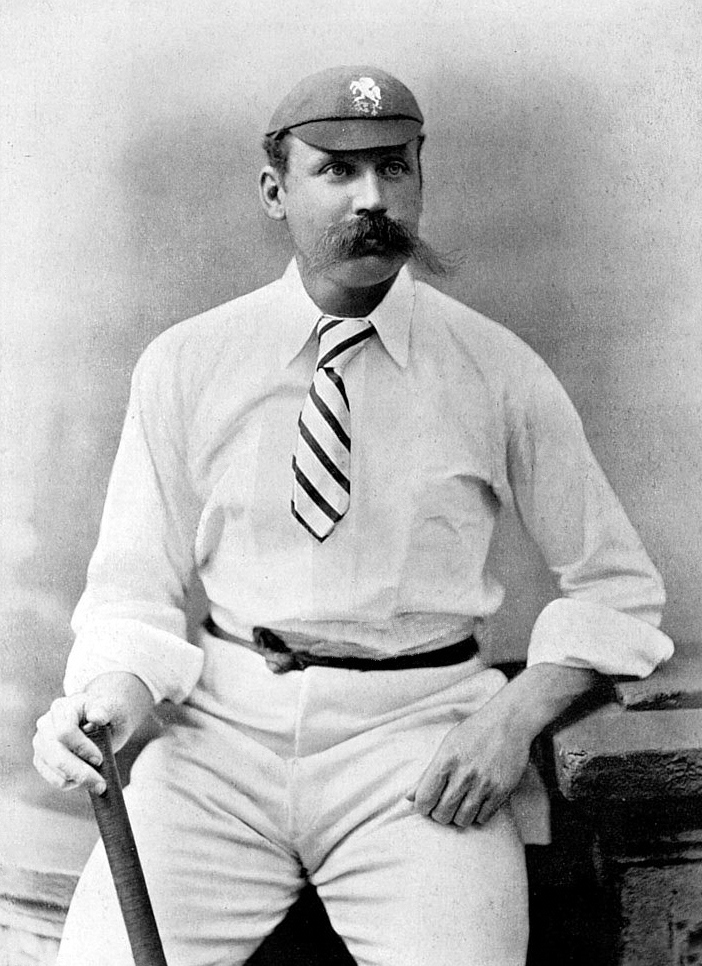
- Fox pictured in the 1890s

Personal information
- Full name: Charles John MacDonald Fox
- Born: 5 December 1858; Dum Dum, Bengal, British India
- Died: 1 April 1901 (aged 42); Albury, New South Wales, Australia
- Batting: Right-handed
- Bowling: Right-arm medium
- Role: All-rounder

Domestic team information
- Years: Team
- 1876: Surrey
- 1888–1893: Kent
- FC debut: 8 June 1876 Surrey v Gloucestershire
- Last FC: 29 June 1893 Kent v Somerset

Career statistics
Competition	First-class
Matches	80
Runs scored	2,147
Batting average	17.17
100s/50s	1/6
Top score	103
Balls bowled	2,044
Wickets	46
Bowling average	17.78
5 wickets in innings	3
10 wickets in match	0
Best bowling	5/21
Catches/stumpings	40/–
- Source: Cricinfo, 27 April 2023

Charles John MacDonald Fox (5 December 1858 – 1 April 1901) was an English cricketer. He played 80 first-class matches, mainly for Kent County Cricket Club, in a career that lasted from 1876 until 1893. A heavy scorer in club cricket, Fox played as an all-rounder in county cricket.

== Early life ==
Fox was born in British India in 1858, the son of William and Rebecca Fox (née Richmond). His father was a school teacher at Murshidabad, and Fox was educated at Doveton College (Note: Fox's Wisden obituary gives the name of the school as Dufton College. This would seem likely to be an error and the most likely school is Doveton College.) in Calcutta and, between 1870 and 1876, at Westminster School in London. He played cricket for Westminster between 1874 and 1876, scoring 87 runs against Charterhouse School in his first season and taking five-wicket hauls against the same opposition in 1875 and 1876.

== Cricket ==
Fox made his first-class cricket debut for Surrey in June 1876 whilst still at school, playing against Gloucestershire at The Oval. He scored only four runs in the match, although his fielding was noted as "fine", and, despite playing other matches for the Surrey Club and Gentlemen of Surrey, this was his only first-class appearance for the county. He played some club cricket for Crystal Palace Cricket Club in 1876 and 1877, but then returned to India where he lived until his father's death in 1884.

After the family returned to England, Fox rejoined Crystal Palace and established a reputation as a good club cricketer, scoring almost 6,000 runs, including 14 centuries, between 1885 and 1888. He had qualified to play for Kent by residence by 1888, and played his first match for the county in June, appearing against Surrey at The Oval―his first first-class match for 12 years. He immediately made an impact, being Kent's top scoring batsman with 42 runs in a tight victory against Nottinghamshire in his second match later in June, before going on to score 93 not out on a difficult batting wicket against Yorkshire―an innings described as "altogether an excellent display of cricket".

He went on to play regularly for Kent until 1893, making 74 first-class appearances before playing his final county matches in 1893. As an amateur who did not need to work, he was able to play regularly throughout the season and was a valuable all-rounder. As well as his matches for Kent, he appeared in first-class matches for the Gentlemen of England in 1888, for the South against the North in 1889 and 1891, and for CI Thornton's XI in 1890. In the same year he captained Hurst Park Club in a victory against the touring Australians, Fox top scoring in the first innings with 31 runs. (Note: This was the only match that Hurst Park played which has been given first-class status.)

Fox scored a total of 2,147 first-class runs and took 46 wickets. Despite his reputation in club cricket, he failed to score 500 runs in any of his first-class seasons. His only first-class century, a score of 103 runs, was made against Nottinghamshire at Tonbridge in July 1891―an innings which Cricket magazine praised as "a most brilliant display of sound and judicious batting", noting that he did not give a chance during the innings. He scored a further six half-centuries, all for Kent, and took five wickets in an innings three times, twice in 1889―including his best bowling analysis of five wickets for 21 runs taken against Surrey at Blackheath―and once in 1890. His Wisden obituary described him as a batsman with "plenty of hitting power" who was, at times, "a very fast scorer" as well as "a useful bowler―keeping a good length and using his head well―and a splendid field". Despite this, Fox is considered to have "not ... taken cricket too seriously". In 1891 he was one of Kent's not out batsmen in a match again Sussex at Hove at lunch but did not complete his inning, returning late from lunch having been lunching with a widow.

== Later life ==
As well as cricket, Fox played association football, playing as a fullback. He lived at Beckenham and Gipsy Hill, later in his life describing his occupation as an "agent". (Note: At the 1891 census he was described as being of independent means.) Fox married Alice Robinson in 1896, but died from a heart attack in 1901 at the age of 42 at Albury in New South Wales on a visit to Australia.

== Bibliography ==
- Carlaw, Derek (2020). Kent County Cricketers, A to Z: Part One (1806–1914) (PDF). Cardiff: ACS.
