= James Caffarey =

English cricketer

Personal information
- Born: 16 May 1859; Mitcham, Surrey
- Died: 25 December 1913 (aged 54); Tooting Grove, London
- Source: Cricinfo, 12 March 2017

James Caffarey (16 May 1859 – 25 December 1913) was an English cricketer. He played three first-class matches for Surrey between 1881 and 1882.

== See also ==
- List of Surrey County Cricket Club players
