= Edward Goatly =

English cricketer

Personal information
- Full name: Edward Garnett Goatly
- Born: 3 December 1882; Twickenham, Middlesex
- Died: 12 February 1958 (aged 75); Brighton, Sussex
- Batting: Right-handed
- Bowling: Left-arm orthodox spin
- Role: Batter

Domestic team information
- Years: Team
- 1901–1914: Surrey

Career statistics
Competition	FC
Matches	126
Runs scored	4,419
Batting average	24.96
100s/50s	3/25
Top score	147*
Balls bowled	1,391
Wickets	19
Bowling average	38.57
5 wickets in innings	0
10 wickets in match	0
Best bowling	4/48
Catches/stumpings	23/0
- Source: Cricinfo, 12 March 2017

Edward Garnett Goatly (3 December 1882 – 12 February 1958) was an English cricketer who played 126 first-class matches for Surrey between 1901 and 1914. Goatly was a middle-order, right-handed batter and an occasional left-arm spin bowler.

Goatly's obituary in Wisden Cricketers' Almanack explains that despite a 14-season first-class cricket career, he was only occasionally a regular in Surrey's first team: "A very sound if unattractive batsman," it stated, "he was too slow in the field to command a regular place." He played in 23 matches in the 1913 season, making 884 runs at an average of 23.26. In 22 matches in 1911, he scored 883 runs at an average of 30.44 runs per innings.

== See also ==
- List of Surrey County Cricket Club players
