= John Bristow (cricketer) =

English cricketer

Personal information
- Born: 13 April 1840; Esher, Surrey
- Died: 25 January 1912 (aged 71); Brookwood, Surrey
- Source: Cricinfo, 12 March 2017

John Bristow (13 April 1840 – 25 January 1912) was an English cricketer. He played 32 first-class matches for Surrey between 1867 and 1873.

== See also ==
- List of Surrey County Cricket Club players
