= Ernest Wilson (English cricketer) =

English cricketer

Personal information
- Born: 24 June 1907; Godstone, Surrey, England
- Died: 3 March 1981 (aged 73); Swansea, Wales
- Source: ESPNcricinfo, 28 May 2016

Ernest Wilson (24 June 1907 – 3 March 1981) was an English cricketer. He played 81 first-class matches for Surrey County Cricket Club between 1928 and 1936.

== See also ==
- List of Surrey County Cricket Club players
