= Edwin Berrington =

English cricketer

Personal information
- Born: 20 April 1850; Waterloo, London
- Died: 11 May 1880 (aged 30); Uxbridge, Middlesex
- Source: Cricinfo, 12 March 2017

Edwin Henry Berrington (20 April 1850 – 11 May 1880) was an English cricketer. He played one first-class match for Surrey in 1872.

== See also ==
- List of Surrey County Cricket Club players
