= Percival King =

English cricketer

Personal information
- Born: 9 December 1835; Stockwell, London
- Died: 29 October 1910 (aged 74); Edinburgh, Scotland
- Source: Cricinfo, 13 March 2017

Percival King (9 December 1835 – 29 October 1910) was an English cricketer. He played one first-class match for Surrey in 1871.

== See also ==
- List of Surrey County Cricket Club players
