= Garth Wheatley =

English cricketer

Garth Angus Wheatley (28 May 1923 – 4 September 2001) was an English first-class cricketer active 1946–50 who played for Surrey and Oxford University. He was born in Twickenham; died in Uppingham.

Wheatley was educated at Uppingham School and Balliol College, Oxford. After achieving a first-class honours degree and a doctorate he returned to Uppingham in 1951 to teach physics, but was also master-in-charge of cricket for 32 years.
