= Philip Slater (cricketer) =

English cricketer

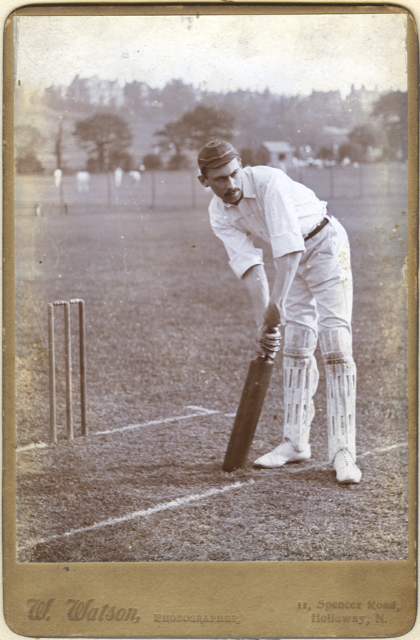
Philip Hugh Slater at bat during a cricket match in England

Philip Hugh Slater (1 April 1876 – 20 August 1958) was an English first-class cricketer active 1907–11 who played for Surrey. He was born in Canterbury; died in Fleet, Hampshire.
