= Albert Freeman (cricketer, born 1887) =

English cricketer

Personal information
- Full name: Albert James Freeman
- Born: 19 July 1887; Kennington, London, England
- Died: 7 January 1945 (aged 57); Greenwich, London, England
- Source: Cricinfo, 12 March 2017

Albert James Freeman (19 July 1887 – 7 January 1945) was an English cricketer. He played one first-class match for Surrey in 1919. He was killed by enemy action, dying at Miller Hospital, Greenwich, during World War II.

== See also ==
- List of Surrey County Cricket Club players
