= Christopher Mays =

English cricketer

Personal information
- Full name: Christopher Sean Mays
- Born: 11 May 1966 (age 60); Brighton, Sussex, England
- Batting: Right-handed
- Bowling: Right-arm off break

Domestic team information
- Years: Team
- 1987–1988: Surrey
- 1986: Sussex

Career statistics
Competition	First-class
Matches	12
Runs scored	39
Batting average	7.80
100s/50s	–/–
Top score	13*
Balls bowled	1,763
Wickets	16
Bowling average	63.06
5 wickets in innings	–
10 wickets in match	–
Best bowling	3/77
Catches/stumpings	5/–
- Source: Cricinfo, 12 March 2012

Christopher Sean Mays (born 11 May 1966) is an English former cricketer. Mays was a right-handed batsman who bowled right-arm off break. He was born at Brighton, Sussex.

Prior to appearing in first-class cricket, Mays played for England Young Cricketers, playing two Youth Test matches and a single Youth One Day International against West Indies Young Cricketers in 1985. Mays later made his first-class debut for Sussex against Glamorgan in the 1986 County Championship. He made seven further first-class appearances for the county in that season, the last of which came against Somerset. In what was his only season with his home county, Mays took 13 wickets in his eight first-class appearances, which came at an average of 54.30, with best figures of 3/77. A tailend batsman, with the bat, Mays scored just 19 runs at an average of 4.75, with a high score of 8 not out.

He left Sussex at the end of the 1986 season to join Surrey. He made his debut for his new county against Sussex in the 1987 County Championship. Mays was unable to establish himself in the Surrey starting eleven, making a further first-class appearance in 1987 against Lancashire, and two more in the 1988 County Championship against Essex and Yorkshire. At the end of the 1988 season Mays qualified as a doctor of medicine and retired from county cricket to pursue a career in medicine.
