= Ian Finlay (art historian) =

Scottish art historian, museum director and writer

William Ian Robertson Finlay, CBE, FRSA (1906–1995) was a Scottish art historian, museum director and writer.

== Biography ==
Born in Auckland, New Zealand on 2 December 1906, Finlay grew up in Scotland and attended the Edinburgh Academy. He later studied at Edinburgh University and started working for the Royal Scottish Museum in 1932 where he worked for 39 years, eventually directing the museum from 1961 to 1971. In addition, Finlay was the secretary of the Royal Fine Art Commission for Scotland from 1953 to 1961. After leaving the Royal Scottish Museum in 1971, he joined the Royal Scottish Academy where he was a Professor of Antiquities until his passing in 1995.

Finlay regularly appeared on BBC radio programmes.

Finlay married Mary Pringle in 1933 and the couple had three children. Finlay died on 10 December 1995.

== Selected works ==
See Ian Finlay's WorldCat page.
