= Stephen Cattley =

English cricketer (1860–1925)

Personal information
- Full name: Stephen Wildman Cattley
- Born: 28 October 1860; Croydon, Surrey
- Died: 11 April 1925 (aged 64); Winchester, Hampshire
- Source: Cricinfo, 12 March 2017

Stephen Cattley (28 October 1860 – 11 April 1925) was an English cricketer. He played 23 first-class matches for Surrey between 1879 and 1883. He was educated at Eton College and was the elder brother of Arthur Cattley.

== See also ==
- List of Surrey County Cricket Club players
