= Albert Freeman (footballer) =

English footballer

Personal information
- Date of birth: 21 October 1899
- Place of birth: Preston, England
- Date of death: Unknown
- Height: 5 ft 8 in (1.73 m)
- Position: Inside forward

Senior career*
Years	Team	Apps	(Gls)
1922–1929	Burnley	78	(19)
1929–1930	Swansea Town	23	(0)
- * Club domestic league appearances and goals

Albert Freeman (21 October 1899 – ?) was an English professional association footballer who played as an inside forward.
