= Miles Staveley =

English cricketer

Miles Staveley (born 12 August 1846) was an English cricketer. He was a right-handed batsman and a right-arm round-arm bowler who played for Surrey. He was born in St. Pancras.

Staveley made a single first-class appearance for the side, in 1870, against Sussex. He scored 3 runs in the first innings and a duck in the second - and took figures of 1–24 with the ball.
