= St John Boultbee =

English cricketer

St John Boultbee (30 April 1843 – 4 September 1898) was an English first-class cricketer active 1867 who played for Surrey. He was born in Bedford; died in Minster, Kent.
