= Andrew Muggleton =

English cricketer (born 1974)

Personal information
- Born: 26 February 1974 (age 52); Barnstaple, Devon
- Source: Cricinfo, 13 March 2017

Andrew Muggleton (born 26 February 1974) is an English cricketer. He played one List A match for Surrey in 1995.

In 2003, Muggleton co-founded the sport and entertainment agency, Generate, which was sold to Mongoose Sports and Entertainment in 2016. In 2019, he joined Marylebone Cricket Club as the new Assistant Secretary for Commercial.

== See also ==
- List of Surrey County Cricket Club players
