= Arthur Cattley =

English cricketer

Personal information
- Born: 27 November 1861; Croydon, Surrey
- Died: 21 September 1895 (aged 33); Dorking, Surrey
- Source: Cricinfo, 12 March 2017

Arthur Cyril Cattley (27 November 1861 – 21 September 1895) was an English cricketer. He played one first-class match for Surrey in 1882.

In addition to his first class cricket career, Cattley worked as a hop merchant. His father, Wildman Cattley (1837–1918) was Master of the Worshipful Company of Grocers and a cattle breeder, but was also a keen amateur cricketer. Arthur was educated at Eton College and was the younger brother of Stephen Cattley.

Arthur Cattley married Margaret Eliza Richardson (1864–1908) in 1887. They had two sons, Cyril Francis Cattley (1888-1917) and Gerald Wildman Cattley (1889-1918), both of whom died while on active duty during the First World War. The couple had moved to Meadowbank, Dorking by 1891, by which time Arthur was already in poor health. He died on 21 September 1895 and was buried at Dorking Cemetery four days later.

Margaret married her second husband, Ernest Brooke Sewell (1865–1946), in 1898. They had a son (Francis Brooke Sewell; 1898–1918) and a daughter (Irene Agnes Brooke Sewell; 1900–70).

== See also ==
- List of Surrey County Cricket Club players
