= Godfrey Lyons =

English cricketer

Personal information
- Full name: Godfrey Louis Lyons
- Born: 23 May 1853; Fleetwood, Lancashire, England
- Died: 30 March 1931 (aged 77); Brighton, Sussex, England
- Batting: Right-handed

Domestic team information
- Years: Team
- 1880: Surrey

Career statistics
Competition	First-class
Matches	1
Runs scored	8
Batting average	4.00
100s/50s	–/–
Top score	8
Balls bowled	–
Wickets	–
Bowling average	–
5 wickets in innings	–
10 wickets in match	–
Best bowling	–
Catches/stumpings	–/–
- Source: Cricinfo, 24 June 2012

Godfrey Louis Lyons (23 May 1853 – 30 March 1931) was an English cricketer. Lyons was a right-handed batsman. He was born at Fleetwood, Lancashire.

Lyons made a single first-class appearance for Surrey against Nottinghamshire in 1880 at The Oval. Nottinghamshire won the toss and elected to bat, making 266 all out. Surrey responded in their first-innings by being dismissed for just 16, at the time the joint fourth lowest total by a team in first-class cricket. Lyons was dismissed in the innings for a duck by Fred Morley. Forced to follow-on in their second-innings, Surrey were dismissed for 185, with Lyons scoring 8 runs before he was dismissed by Billy Barnes. Nottinghamshire won by an innings and 65 runs. This was his only major appearance for Surrey.

He died at Brighton, Sussex, on 30 March 1931.
