= Alfred Boardman (cricketer) =

English cricketer (1859–1928)

Personal information
- Full name: Alfred Joseph Boardman
- Born: 11 May 1859; Barnsbury, Middlesex, England
- Died: 11 November 1928 (aged 69); Carshalton, Surrey, England
- Batting: Right-handed
- Bowling: Right-arm medium

Domestic team information
- Years: Team
- 1878–1880: Surrey

Career statistics
Competition	First-class
Matches	10
Runs scored	162
Batting average	9.52
100s/50s	–/–
Top score	33
Balls bowled	32
Wickets	0
Bowling average	–
5 wickets in innings	–
10 wickets in match	–
Best bowling	–
Catches/stumpings	1/–
- Source: Cricinfo, 24 June 2019

Alfred Joseph Boardman (11 May 1859 – 11 November 1928) was an English first-class cricketer.

Boardman was born at Barnsbury in Islington in May 1859. He made his debut in first-class cricket for Surrey against Nottinghamshire at Nottingham in 1878. He played first-class cricket for Surrey until 1880, making nine appearances, as well as appearing in one first-class match during that time for London United Eleven against the United North of England Eleven at Birmingham in 1879. In ten first-class matches, he scored 162 runs at an average of 9.52, with a high score of 33. He died at Carshalton in November 1928.
