= Peter Waterman (cricketer) =

English cricketer (born 1961)

Personal information
- Full name: Peter Andrew Waterman
- Born: 26 March 1961 (age 65); Pinner, Middlesex, England
- Batting: Right-handed
- Bowling: Right-arm medium-fast

Domestic team information
- Years: Team
- 1990–1997: Hertfordshire
- 1987–1988: Bedfordshire
- 1983–1985: Surrey

Career statistics
Competition	First-class	List A
Matches	11	10
Runs scored	7	27
Batting average	2.33	13.50
100s/50s	–/–	–/–
Top score	6*	17*
Balls bowled	1,274	450
Wickets	18	3
Bowling average	40.38	123.33
5 wickets in innings	–	–
10 wickets in match	–	–
Best bowling	3/22	1/25
Catches/stumpings	4/–	2/–
- Source: Cricinfo, 26 August 2012

Peter Andrew Waterman (born 26 March 1961) is a former English cricketer. Waterman was a right-handed batsman who bowled right-arm medium-fast. He was born at Pinner, Middlesex.

== Career ==
Waterman made his first-class debut for Surrey against Sussex at The Oval in the 1983 County Championship. He made ten further first-class appearances for the county, the last of which came against Gloucestershire in the 1985 County Championship. As a bowler, he took 18 wickets in his eleven first-class matches, which came at an average of 40.38, with best figures of 3/22. His List A debut for Surrey also came in 1983, against the touring New Zealanders. He made nine further List A appearances for the county, the last of which came against Gloucestershire in the 1985 John Player Special League. However, in his ten matches, he only took 3 wickets, which came at an expensive average of 123.33. He left Surrey at the end of the 1985 season.

In 1987, he joined Bedfordshire, making his debut for the county against Cambridgeshire at Fenner's in the Minor Counties Championship. He made ten further Minor Counties Championship appearances for Bedfordshire, the last of which came against Cumberland in the 1988 Minor Counties Championship. He also made one appearance in the MCCA Knockout Trophy, against Suffolk in 1988. He later joined Hertfordshire, making his debut for the county in the 1990 Minor Counties Championship against Northumberland at Osborne Avenue, Jesmond. He made 24 further appearances in the Minor Counties Championship for the county, the last of which came against Lincolnshire in 1997. He also made seven MCCA Knockout Trophy appearances for Hertfordshire.
