= Edmund Vyse =

English cricketer

Edmund Waller Vyse (20 February 1831 – 11 April 1890) was an English first-class cricketer active 1854–66 who played for Surrey. He was born in Luton and died in Westgate-on-Sea. He played in 13 first-class matches.
