= John Vince =

English cricketer

Personal information
- Full name: John Vince
- Born: 31 December 1849; Hackbridge, Surrey, England
- Died: 5 May 1886 (aged 36); Beddington, Surrey, England
- Batting: Right-handed
- Bowling: Right-arm fast

Domestic team information
- Years: Team
- 1870: Surrey

Career statistics
Competition	First-class
Matches	11
Runs scored	60
Batting average	2.85
100s/50s	–/–
Top score	10*
Balls bowled	895
Wickets	15
Bowling average	30.26
5 wickets in innings	–
10 wickets in match	–
Best bowling	4/58
Catches/stumpings	11/–
- Source: Cricinfo, 23 June 2012

John Vince (31 December 1849 – 5 May 1886) was an English cricketer. Vince was a right-handed batsman who bowled right-arm fast. He was born at Hackbridge, Surrey.

Vince made his first-class debut for Surrey against the Marylebone Cricket Club in 1870 at Lord's. He made ten further first-class appearances for the county in 1870, the last of which came against the Marylebone Cricket Club at The Oval. Primarily a bowler, Vince took 15 wickets at an average of 30.26, with best figures of 4/58. With the bat, he scored 60 runs at a batting average of 2.85, with a high score of 10 not out.

He died at Beddington, Surrey, on 5 May 1886.
