= Edgar Wiltshire =

English cricketer

Edgar Wiltshire (25 September 1877 – 25 August 1912) was an English first-class cricketer active 1902–03 who played for Surrey. He was born in Addiscombe; died in London.
