= Edward Lutterlock =

English cricketer

Personal information
- Full name: Edward Lutterlock
- Born: 26 February 1852; Stockwell, Surrey, England
- Died: 30 July 1938 (aged 86); St Albans, Hertfordshire, England
- Height: 5 ft 7 in (1.70 m)
- Batting: Right-handed
- Bowling: Right-arm roundarm fast

Domestic team information
- Years: Team
- 1874: Surrey

Career statistics
Competition	First-class
Matches	3
Runs scored	23
Batting average	3.83
100s/50s	–/–
Top score	8
Balls bowled	–
Wickets	–
Bowling average	–
5 wickets in innings	–
10 wickets in match	–
Best bowling	–
Catches/stumpings	2/–
- Source: Cricinfo, 25 June 2012

Edward Lutterlock (26 February 1852 – 30 July 1938) was an English cricketer. Lutterlock was a right-handed batsman who bowled right-arm roundarm fast. He was born at Stockwell, Surrey.

Lutterlock made three first-class appearances for Surrey in 1874, against Yorkshire at Bramall Lane, Sheffield, Nottinghamshire at Trent Bridge, with his third appearance being a return fixture against Nottinghamshire at The Oval. In his three first-class matches, he scored 23 runs in his two matches, at an average of 3.83, with a high score of 8.

He died at St Albans, Hertfordshire, on 30 July 1938.
