= Felix Fielding =

English cricketer

Personal information
- Full name: Felix Fielding
- Born: 24 February 1858; Lewisham, Kent, England
- Died: 4 February 1910 (aged 51); Surbiton, Surrey, England
- Batting: Right-handed
- Role: Wicket-keeper

Domestic team information
- Years: Team
- 1889: Surrey

Career statistics
Competition	First-class
Matches	4
Runs scored	100
Batting average	20.00
100s/50s	–/1
Top score	75
Balls bowled	–
Wickets	–
Bowling average	–
5 wickets in innings	–
10 wickets in match	–
Best bowling	–
Catches/stumpings	4/3
- Source: Cricinfo, 23 June 2012

Felix Fielding (24 February 1858 – 4 February 1910) was an English cricketer. Fielding was a right-handed batsman who fielded as a wicket-keeper. He was born at Lewisham, Kent, and was educated at Malvern College.

Fielding made his first-class debut for Surrey against Oxford University in 1889 at The Oval. He made a further first-class appearance for the county in that season, against Middlesex at The Oval. He also appeared in a first-class match for the South against the North in 1889 at Old Trafford, as well as appearing in the repeat fixture in 1890 at Lord's. In four first-class matches, Fielding scored 100 runs at an average of 20.00, with a high score of 75. This score came for Surrey on debut.

He died at Surbiton, Surrey, on 4 February 1910.
