= William Jupp =

English cricketer

Personal information
- Full name: William Thomas Jupp
- Born: 11 December 1851; Dorking, Surrey, England
- Died: 3 August 1878 (aged 26); Chertsey, Surrey, England
- Batting: Right-handed
- Bowling: Right-arm roundarm fast
- Relatives: Harry Jupp (cousin)

Domestic team information
- Years: Team
- 1876: Surrey

Career statistics
Competition	First-class
Matches	3
Runs scored	27
Batting average	6.75
100s/50s	–/–
Top score	11
Balls bowled	68
Wickets	–
Bowling average	–
5 wickets in innings	–
10 wickets in match	–
Best bowling	–
Catches/stumpings	2/–
- Source: Cricinfo, 24 June 2012

William Thomas Jupp (11 November 1851 – 3 August 1878) was an English cricketer. Jupp was a right-handed batsman who bowled right-arm roundarm fast. He was born at Dorking, Surrey.

Jupp made two first-class appearances for Surrey in 1876, against Kent at Mote Park, Maidstone, and Gloucestershire at Clifton College. He scored 25 runs in his two matches, at an average of 12.50, with a high score of 11. He made a single first-class appearance in that same season for a United South of England Eleven against a United North of England Eleven at Argyle Street, Hull.

He died at Chertsey, Surrey, on 3 August 1878, after suffering a brain injury during a cricket match. His cousin, Harry Jupp, played Test cricket for England.
