= Charles Meymott =

English cricketer (1813–1867)

Charles Meymott (8 January 1813 – 24 June 1867) was an English first-class cricketer active 1846–47 who played for Surrey. He was born in Southwark and died in Sydney. He played in two first-class matches.
