= William Tanner (cricketer) =

English cricketer

William Tanner (11 April 1841 – unknown) was an English first-class cricketer active 1863–68 who played for Surrey. He was born in Weybridge.
