= Frederick Caesar =

English cricketer (1827–1882)

Frederick Bowles Caesar (11 October 1827 – 5 October 1882) was an English first-class cricketer active 1859–62 who played for Surrey. A brother of Julius Caesar, he was born in Godalming and died in Bermondsey. He played in eight first-class matches.
