= Robert Whitley =

English cricketer

Personal information
- Full name: Robert Thomas Whitley
- Born: c. 1837; Pimlico, London, England
- Died: 26 October 1887 (aged 49/50); Fulham, London, England
- Role: Wicket-keeper

Domestic team information
- Years: Team
- 1873: Surrey

Career statistics
Competition	First-class
Matches	1
Runs scored	8
Batting average	4.00
100s/50s	0/0
Top score	5
Catches/stumpings	2/–
- Source: Cricinfo, 16 April 2013

Robert Thomas Whitley (c. 1837 – 26 October 1887) was an English cricketer. Whitley's batting style is unknown, though it is known he played as a wicket-keeper. He was born at Pimlico in London.

Whitley made a single first-class appearance for Surrey in 1873 against Nottinghamshire at Trent Bridge. In a match which Nottinghamshire won by six wickets, Whitley scored 5 runs in Surrey's first-innings, before being dismissed by James Shaw. In Surrey's second innings, he was dismissed for 3 runs by the same bowler. He also took two catches behind the stumps, both in Nottinghamshire's second-innings. This was his only first-class appearance.

He died at Fulham, London on 26 October 1887.
