= Kenneth McEntyre =

English cricketer (born 1944)

Personal information
- Born: 24 March 1944 (age 82); Chester, Cheshire
- Source: Cricinfo, 13 March 2017

Kenneth McEntyre (born 24 March 1944) is an English cricketer. He played three first-class matches for Surrey between 1965 and 1966.

== See also ==
- List of Surrey County Cricket Club players
