= George Whale (cricketer) =

English cricketer

George Whale (27 March 1833 – 22 November 1896) was an English first-class cricketer active 1861–67 who played for Surrey. He was born in Guildford and died in Lambeth. He played in five first-class matches.
