= Lee Hodgson =

English cricketer (born 1986)

Personal information
- Full name: Lee John Hodgson
- Born: 29 June 1984 (age 42); Middlesbrough, England
- Height: 5 ft 6 in (1.68 m)
- Batting: Right-handed
- Bowling: Right-arm fast-medium
- Role: All-Rounder

Domestic team information
- Years: Team
- 2008: Surrey
- 2009–2011: Yorkshire (squad no. 15)

Career statistics
Competition	FC	LA	T20
Matches	4	8	2
Runs scored	165	9	39
Batting average	33.00	4.50	–
100s/50s	0/1	0/0	0/0
Top score	63	9	39*
Balls bowled	299	228	36
Wickets	2	4	2
Bowling average	108.00	53.25	29.50
5 wickets in innings	0	0	0
10 wickets in match	0	0	0
Best bowling	1/42	2/44	2/29
Catches/stumpings	3/–	4/–	1/–
- Source: Cricinfo, 12 May 2022

Lee John Hodgson (born 29 June 1986) is an English first-class cricketer. He is a right-handed batsman and a right-arm medium-fast bowler who played for Yorkshire, having previously appeared for Surrey.

Hodgson began his cricketing career playing in the Cockspur Cup for Saltburn C.C. - playing one match in the 2004 competition, and one the following year. Hodgson started his Second XI career for MCC Young Cricketers in 2006, continuing to play for them in 2007.

Hodgson's one day career began in August 2008, making his Pro40 debut against Warwickshire. While he did not bat in the game, he bowled four overs, without capturing a wicket. Hodgson picked up his debut first-class appearance for Surrey against Nottinghamshire in September 2008. He appeared in three first-class matches for Yorkshire between 2009 and 2011.

In September 2011, Yorkshire County Cricket Club announced that Hodgson was being released by the county.
