= Ian Finlay (cricketer) =

English cricketer (born 1946)

Ian William Finlay (born 14 May 1946 in Woking) was an English first-class cricketer active 1971–74 who played for Surrey.

== See also ==
- Cricket in England
- Cricket in Ireland
- Cricket in Scotland
- Cricket in Wales
- England cricket team
- England women's cricket team
- List of Surrey County Cricket Club players
