= Robert Long (English cricketer) =

English cricketer

Personal information
- Full name: Robert Long
- Born: 9 November 1846; Richmond, Surrey, England
- Died: 6 August 1924 (aged 77); Enfield, Middlesex, England
- Batting: Right-handed
- Bowling: Right-arm fast

Domestic team information
- Years: Team
- 1870: Surrey

Career statistics
Competition	First-class
Matches	2
Runs scored	0
Batting average	0.00
100s/50s	–/–
Top score	0
Balls bowled	36
Wickets	–
Bowling average	–
5 wickets in innings	–
10 wickets in match	–
Best bowling	–
Catches/stumpings	–/–
- Source: Cricinfo, 14 January 2012

Robert Long (9 November 1846 – 6 August 1924) was an English cricketer. Long was a right-handed batsman who bowled right-arm fast. He was born at Richmond, Surrey.

Long made two first-class appearances for Surrey in 1870 against the Marylebone Cricket Club at Lord's, and Lancashire at Old Trafford. He batted four times in these two matches, being dismissed for a duck each time he batted. He also went wicketless in both matches.

He died at Enfield, Middlesex on 6 August 1924.
