= Henry Mayo (cricketer) =

English cricketer

Personal information
- Born: 13 November 1847; South Lambeth, London
- Died: 30 October 1891 (aged 43); Brixton, London
- Source: Cricinfo, 13 March 2017

Henry Mayo (13 November 1847 – 30 October 1891) was an English cricketer. He played fourteen first-class matches for Surrey between 1868 and 1870.

== See also ==
- List of Surrey County Cricket Club players
