= Gary Winterborne =

English cricketer

Personal information
- Full name: Gary Winterborne
- Born: 26 June 1967 (age 59); Hammersmith, London, England
- Batting: Right-handed
- Bowling: Right-arm medium

Domestic team information
- Years: Team
- 1986: Surrey

Career statistics
Competition	First-class
Matches	1
Runs scored	–
Batting average	–
100s/50s	–/–
Top score	–
Balls bowled	120
Wickets	–
Bowling average	–
5 wickets in innings	–
10 wickets in match	–
Best bowling	–
Catches/stumpings	–/–
- Source: Cricinfo, 26 August 2012

Gary Winterborne (born 26 June 1967) is a former English cricketer. Winterborne was a right-handed batsman who bowled right-arm medium. He was born at Hammersmith, London.

Winterborne made a single first-class appearance for Surrey against Cambridge University at Fenner's in 1986. He wasn't required to bat during the match, while with the ball he bowled a total of twenty wicketless overs, with the match ending in a draw. This was his only major appearance for Surrey.
