= Robert Bushell =

English cricketer

Robert Hitchens Bushell (c. 1836 – 13 July 1883) was an English first-class cricketer active 1857–58 who played for Surrey. He was born in England and died in Kew. He played in two first-class matches.
