= Robert Bush (Surrey cricketer) =

English cricketer

Robert Thompson Bush (14 January 1839 – 24 December 1874) was an English first-class cricketer active 1864–68 who played for Surrey. He was born and died in Kennington.
