= Donald Weeks =

English cricketer

Donald Weeks (5 February 1903 – 11 April 1967) was an English first-class cricketer active 1933 who played for Surrey. He was born in Lewisham; died in Rye, East Sussex.
