= Louis Redgewell =

English cricketer

Louis John Redgewell (13 October 1894 – 17 February 1966) was an English first-class cricketer active 1922–25 who played for Surrey. He was born in Battersea; died in Wandsworth.
