= William Roller =

English cricketer

Personal information
- Full name: William Eyton Roller
- Born: 1 February 1858; Clapham Common, England
- Died: 27 August 1949 (aged 91); Bayswater, England
- Batting: Right-handed
- Bowling: Right-arm medium
- Relatives: Charles Roller (brother)

Domestic team information
- Years: Team
- 1881–1890: Surrey
- FC debut: 25 July 1881 Surrey v Kent
- Last FC: 28 August 1890 Gentlemen of England v I Zingari

Career statistics
Competition	First-class
Matches	120
Runs scored	3,820
Batting average	21.10
100s/50s	7/15
Top score	204
Balls bowled	10,507
Wickets	190
Bowling average	19.62
5 wickets in innings	4
10 wickets in match	0
Best bowling	6/44
Catches/stumpings	78/–
- Source: CricketArchive, March 2012

William Eyton Roller (1 February 1858 — 27 August 1949) was an English cricketer who played for Surrey from 1881 to 1890 when they were Champion County six years running.

Roller was born in Clapham Common, the son of Frederick William Roller, a merchant of the Grange, Clapham Common, Surrey. He was educated at Westminster School, where he was a member of the cricket XI in 1873 and was the only one with a double figure average. He matriculated from Caius College, Cambridge in Autumn 1876. He did not play first-class cricket for the university but he made his debut for Surrey in July 1881 Kent. This was the first of 102 matches for Surrey, between then and 1890.

Against Lancashire at The Oval in 1883 Surrey were set 234 to win, but lost seven wickets for 122. When K. J. Key joined Roller, they scored 56 of the 112 runs required by the evening and the remaining 56 the next morning in what was considered as one of the best performances of the season. In 1885 he scored 204 and managed a hat-trick against Sussex at The Oval and made 144 in the return match at Brighton. In 1887 against Lancashire at Old Trafford, Roller and WW Read shared a third wicket partnership of 305 in which Roller made 120 and W. W. Read 247. Altogether he scored 3,822 runs for the county and took 188 wickets.

Roller also played five times for Gentlemen of England, four times for the South and once each for Cambridge University Past and Present and the Lyric Club. In 1885 and 1886 he toured the United States and Canada with E. J. Sanders' team, and was acting captain in the latter year.

Roller was a right-handed batsman and played 193 innings in 120 first-class matches with an average of 21.10 and a top score of 204. He was a right-arm medium pace bowler and took 190 first-class wickets at an average of 19.62 and a best performance of 6 for 44. He was one of the finest all-round cricketers.

Roller was a fine swimmer and Association football player. He was a fine golfer and in 1898 was elected captain of the Biarritz Golf Club. He was Vice President of Surrey.

Roller died in Bayswater at the age of 91 on 27 August 1949.

Roller married firstly Ada Isabel Tickle, daughter of J. B. Tickle, of Sydney, New South Wales, and had issue. He married secondly in 1908 Mabel Edith Hill, sister of his first wife.
