= Tony Stockley =

English cricketer

Anthony John ("Tony") Stockley (4 April 1940 – 29 May 1991) was an English first-class cricketer active 1967–73 who played for Surrey. He was born in Kingston-upon-Thames; died in Adelaide.
