= James Stafford (cricketer) =

English cricketer

Personal information
- Full name: James Pratt Stafford
- Born: 1 January 1844; Godalming, Surrey, England
- Died: 24 September 1919 (aged 75); Fratton, Hampshire, England
- Batting: Unknown
- Bowling: Unknown

Domestic team information
- Years: Team
- 1864: Surrey

Career statistics
Competition	First-class
Matches	1
Runs scored	0
Batting average	0.00
100s/50s	–/–
Top score	0
Balls bowled	48
Wickets	–
Bowling average	–
5 wickets in innings	–
10 wickets in match	–
Best bowling	–
Catches/stumpings	–/–
- Source: Cricinfo, 29 August 2012

James Pratt Stafford (1 January 1844 – 24 August 1919) was an English cricketer. Stafford's batting and bowling styles are unknown. He was born at Godalming, Surrey.

Stafford made a single first-class appearance for Surrey against Yorkshire in 1864 at Brammall Lane, Sheffield. Surrey won the toss and elected to bat first, making 195 all out, with Stafford the last man out in the innings, dismissed for a duck by Luke Greenwood. Yorkshire were then dismissed for 236 in their first-innings, during which Stafford bowled twelve wicketless overs, which conceded 31 runs. In response, Surrey made 247 all out in their second-innings, with Stafford once again the last man out when he was dismissed for a duck by Roger Iddison. Yorkshire reached 33/2 in their second-innings, at which point the match was declared a draw.

He died at Fratton, Hampshire, on 24 August 1919.
