= Peter Westerman =

English cricketer

Peter Westerman (12 August 1920 – 3 February 1992) was an English first-class cricketer active 1949–51 who played for Surrey. He was born in East Sheen; died in Hampton, Middlesex.

Peter Westerman is an artist based in Denver, Colorado. He is also the founder and creative director of Threyda, an art and apparel company.
