= Walter Heath (Surrey cricketer) =

English cricketer

Personal information
- Full name: Walter Hodsoll Gordon Heath
- Born: 3 December 1897; Streatham, London
- Died: 4 December 1965 (aged 68); Kingswear, Devon
- Role: Wicket-keeper

Domestic team information
- Years: Team
- 1919: Surrey
- Source: CricInfo, 12 March 2017

Walter Hodsoll Gordon Heath (3 December 1897 – 4 December 1965) was an English cricketer. He played seven first-class matches between 1919 and 1924.

Born at Streatham in 1897, Heath was educated at Haileybury and Imperial Service College where he played as a wicket-keeper in the school cricket XI. After leaving school in 1914, he attended Royal Military Academy, Woolwich and was commissioned as a second lieutenant in the Royal Artillery in April 1915. Promoted to lieutenant, he saw service on the Western Front before being attached to the Royal Flying Corps (RFC) as an observer in 1917. When the RFC became the Royal Air Force in 1918, Heath transferred to the RAF, serving as a Flying Officer Observer until being demobilised in 1919. He played some cricket for the Royal Air Force cricket team in 1919.

Heath's first-class cricket debut also came during the 1919 season. He played twice for Surrey County Cricket Club in the County Championship during May, holding four catches and scoring 58 not out against Essex at The Oval. The following month he played twice against Oxford University, first for a side organised by Plum Warner before making his third and final first-class appearance for Surrey. At the beginning of July he played against he university for a third time, this time in a side organised by HDG Leveson-Gower.

During 1920 Heath played for the Gentlemen of the South in a sixth first-class fixture, before making his final first-class appearance in 1924, playing for Leveson-Gower's side against the Minor Counties. He also played for Surrey's Second XI in the Minor Counties Championship during 1920. In his seven first-class matches Heath scored a total of 170 runs, with the 58 he made against Essex his highest score.

Immediately before the start of World War II Heath was activated from the RAF Reserve. He died at Kingswear in Devon in 1965, the day after his 68th birthday.
