= Roland Bell =

English cricketer

Personal information
- Full name: Roland Bell
- Born: 16 May 1857; Bishop's Stortford, Hertfordshire, England
- Died: 29 January 1935 (aged 77); Leamington Spa, Warwickshire, England
- Batting: Right-handed
- Bowling: Unknown-arm roundarm slow

Domestic team information
- Years: Team
- 1876: Surrey

Career statistics
Competition	First-class
Matches	1
Runs scored	4
Batting average	2.00
100s/50s	–/–
Top score	3
Balls bowled	–
Wickets	–
Bowling average	–
5 wickets in innings	–
10 wickets in match	–
Best bowling	–
Catches/stumpings	–/–
- Source: Cricinfo, 30 December 2011

Roland Bell (16 May 1857 – 29 January 1935) was an English cricketer. Bell was a right-handed batsman who bowled roundarm slow, though with which arm he bowled with is not known. He was born at Bishop's Stortford, Hertfordshire.

Bell made a single first-class appearance for Surrey against Nottinghamshire at The Oval in 1876. Bell was dismissed for a single run in Surrey's first-innings of 83 by Alfred Shaw, with Nottinghamshire replying to this innings by making 153 in their first-innings. Surrey made 142 in their second-innings, with Bell being dismissed again by Shaw, this time for 3 runs. Nottinghamshire chased down their target of 73 to win the match by 10 wickets. This was his only major appearance for Surrey.

He later became the headmaster of Huntingdon Grammar School, a position he held from 1885 to 1905. He died at Leamington Spa, Warwickshire on 29 January 1935.
