= Clarence Walter =

English cricketer

Personal information
- Full name: Clarence Richard Walter
- Born: 26 March 1837; Brentford, Middlesex, England
- Died: 11 December 1918 (aged 80); Cardiff, Glamorgan, Wales

Domestic team information
- Years: Team
- 1859: Surrey

Career statistics
Competition	First-class
Matches	1
Runs scored	0
Batting average	0.00
100s/50s	0/0
Top score	0
Catches/stumpings	0/–
- Source: Cricinfo, 2 April 2012

Clarence Richard Walter (26 March 1837 – 11 December 1918) was an English cricketer. His batting style is unknown. He was born at Brentford, Middlesex. Walter made a single first-class appearance for Surrey against a combined Kent and Sussex team in 1859 at the Royal Brunswick Ground, Hove. In a match which Surrey won by four wickets, Walter batted once in Surrey's first-innings and was dismissed for a duck by Edgar Willsher. This was his only major appearance for Surrey. He died in Cardiff, Glamorgan, Wales, on 11 December 1918.
