= Stuart Surridge junior =

English cricketer (born 1951)

Stuart Spicer Surridge (born 28 October 1951 in Westminster) is an English former first-class cricketer active 1971–80 who played for Surrey as a wicket-keeper. He is the son of Surrey's 1950s captain Stuart Surridge.
