= Frederick Johnson (Surrey cricketer) =

English cricketer

Personal information
- Born: 14 March 1851; Rolvenden, Kent
- Died: 24 November 1923 (aged 72); Lambeth, London
- Source: Cricinfo, 13 March 2017

Frederick Johnson (14 March 1851 – 24 November 1923) was an English cricketer. He played twenty first-class matches for Surrey between 1878 and 1883.

== See also ==
- List of Surrey County Cricket Club players
