= George Earnshaw (cricketer) =

English cricketer

Personal information
- Full name: George Russell Bell Earnshaw
- Born: 5 May 1857; Clapham, Surrey, England
- Died: 29 December 1894 (aged 37); Merano, Tyrol, Austria-Hungary
- Batting: Right-handed
- Relatives: Alfred Earnshaw (father)

Domestic team information
- Years: Team
- 1881: Surrey

Career statistics
| Competition | First-class |
|---|---|
| Matches | 2 |
| Runs scored | 31 |
| Batting average | 10.33 |
| 100s/50s | 0/0 |
| Top score | 13* |
| Balls bowled | 8 |
| Wickets | 0 |
| Bowling average | – |
| 5 wickets in innings | – |
| 10 wickets in match | – |
| Best bowling | – |
| Catches/stumpings | 1/– |
- Source: Cricinfo, 24 June 2012

George Russell Bell Earnshaw (5 May 1857 – 29 December 1894) was an English cricketer. Earnshaw was a right-handed batsman, although his bowling style is unknown. He was born at Clapham, Surrey.

Earnshaw made two first-class appearances for Surrey in 1880, against Middlesex and Yorkshire, with both matches played at The Oval. In his first match, Middlesex won the toss and elected to bat first, making 179 all out. Surrey responded in their first-innings by making just 80 all out, with Earnshaw being dismissed for 5 runs by Augustus Ford. Forced to follow-on in their second-innings, Surrey were dismissed for 69, with Earnshaw ending the innings not out on 13. Middlesex won the match by an innings and 30 runs. In his second match, Yorkshire won the toss and elected to bat first, making 398 all out. Surrey responded in their first-innings by making 176 all out, with Earnshaw being dismissed for 13 runs by Allen Hill. Forced to follow-on in their second-innings, Surrey were dismissed for 99, with Earnshaw being dismissed by Hill for a duck. Yorkshire won the match by an innings and 123 runs.

He died at Merano in Austria-Hungary on 29 December 1894. His father, Alfred Earnshaw, also played first-class cricket.
