= James Heartfield (cricketer) =

English cricketer

Personal information
- Full name: James Henry Heartfield
- Born: 19 January 1823; Mitcham, Surrey, England
- Died: 28 November 1891 (aged 68); Greenwich, London, England
- Batting: Right-handed
- Bowling: Right-arm roundarm fast

Domestic team information
- Years: Team
- 1860–1867: Surrey

Career statistics
Competition	First-class
Matches	10
Runs scored	29
Batting average	2.41
100s/50s	–/–
Top score	10*
Balls bowled	937
Wickets	21
Bowling average	16.09
5 wickets in innings	2
10 wickets in match	–
Best bowling	6/28
Catches/stumpings	5/–
- Source: Cricinfo, 29 August 2012

James Henry Heartfield (19 January 1823 – 28 November 1891) was an English cricketer. Heartfield was a right-handed batsman who bowled right-arm roundarm fast. He was born at Mitcham, Surrey.

Heartfield made his first-class debut for Surrey against Sussex at The Oval in 1860. He made nine further first-class appearances for the county, the last of which came against Yorkshire. A bowler, he took 21 wickets at an average of 16.09, with best figures of 6/28. One of two five wicket hauls he took during his career, his best figures came against Sussex in 1860 at the Royal Brunswick Ground, Hove. He also made a single first-class appearance for a New All England Eleven against a New England Eleven in 1862.

He later stood as an umpire in three first-class matches in 1875. He died at Greenwich, London, on 28 November 1891.
