= Arthur Rutty =

English cricketer

Arthur William Forder Rutty (22 August 1872 – 10 January 1932) was an English first-class cricketer active 1908–20 who played for Surrey. He was born in Reading and died in West Jesmond.
