= Charles Burls =

English cricketer

Personal information
- Full name: Charles William Burls
- Born: 8 March 1847; Peckham Rye, Surrey
- Died: 17 December 1923 (aged 76); Datchet, Buckinghamshire
- Batting: Right-handed

Domestic team information
- Years: Team
- 1873–1880: Surrey
- Source: Cricinfo, 12 March 2017

Charles William Burls (8 March 1847 – 17 December 1923) was an English cricketer.

Burls was born at Peckham Rye in Surrey in 1847. He played a total of 17 first-class cricket matches, making his debut in a match between Surrey and Gloucestershire at The Oval in 1873. He played ten first-class matches for Surrey between 1873 and 1880 and later also appeared in first-class cricket for a variety of other sides, including The Orleans Club, CI Thornton's England XI and The Gentlemen of England. In his 17 matches he scored a total of 304 runs.

Burls died at Datchet in Buckinghamshire in 1923 aged 76.
