= William Carter (Surrey cricketer) =

English cricketer

Personal information
- Full name: William John Carter
- Born: 23 January 1841; Kennington, Surrey, England
- Died: 18 November 1888 (aged 47); Kingston upon Thames, Surrey, England
- Batting: Right-handed
- Bowling: Right-arm fast

Domestic team information
- Years: Team
- 1871–1874: Surrey

Career statistics
Competition	First-class
Matches	8
Runs scored	91
Batting average	8.27
100s/50s	–/–
Top score	21*
Balls bowled	116
Wickets	4
Bowling average	10.25
5 wickets in innings	–
10 wickets in match	–
Best bowling	2/15
Catches/stumpings	2/–
- Source: Cricinfo, 23 June 2012

William John Carter (21 January 1841 – 18 November 1888) was an English cricketer. Carter was a right-handed batsman who bowled right-arm fast. He was born at Kennington, Surrey.

Carter made his first-class debut for Surrey against the Kent in 1871 at The Oval. He made six further first-class appearances for the county, the last of which came against Gloucestershire in 1874. In his seven first-class matches for the county, he scored 77 runs at an average of 8.55, with a high score of 21 not out. With the ball, he took 4 wickets at a bowling average of 10.25, with best figures of 2/15. He also made a single first-class appearance in 1874 for a United South of England Eleven against Yorkshire at Great Horton Road, Bradford.

He died at Kingston upon Thames, Surrey, on 18 November 1888.
