= Alfred Earnshaw =

English cricketer

Personal information
- Full name: Alfred Earnshaw
- Born: 7 August 1814; Bloomsbury, Middlesex, England
- Died: 8 March 1895 (aged 80); Bromley, Kent, England
- Relatives: George Earnshaw (son)

Domestic team information
- Years: Team
- 1847: Surrey

Career statistics
Competition	First-class
Matches	5
Runs scored	62
Batting average	6.20
100s/50s	0/0
Top score	15
Catches/stumpings	0/–
- Source: Cricinfo, 7 April 2013

Alfred Earnshaw (7 August 1814 – 8 March 1895) was an English cricketer. Earnshaw's batting style is unknown. He was born at Bloomsbury, Middlesex.

Earnshaw made his first-class debut for the Surrey Club against the Marylebone Cricket Club at Lord's in 1846. The following year he made his debut for Surrey against the Marylebone Cricket Club. He made three further first-class appearances for Surrey in 1847, playing twice against Kent and one further match against the Marylebone Cricket Club. Earnshaw made a total of five appearances in first-class cricket, scoring a total of 62 at an average of 6.20, with a high score of 15.

He died at Bromley, Kent on 8 March 1895. His son George Earnshaw also played first-class cricket.
