= Thomas Watts (cricketer) =

English cricketer

Thomas Watts (21 August 1899 – 19 January 1976) was an English first-class cricketer active 1921–26 who played for Surrey. He was born in Kennington; died in St Helens, Lancashire.
