= William Rushworth (cricketer) =

English cricketer

William Robert Rushworth (4 November 1914 – 19 January 1966) was an English first-class cricketer active 1946–47 who played for Surrey. He was born in Dulwich; died in Bedford.
