= Thomas Trodd =

English cricketer

Thomas Trodd (c. 1842 – 26 July 1908) was an English first-class cricketer active 1879–80 who played for Surrey. He was born in Cobham; died in Macclesfield.
