= Sydney Cooper =

English cricketer

Sydney Hyde Cooper (5 February 1913 – 20 January 1982) was an English first-class cricketer active 1936 who played for Surrey. He was born in Carshalton and died in Wallington.
