= Andy Robson (cricketer) =

English cricketer

Personal information
- Full name: Andrew George Robson
- Born: 27 April 1971 (age 55); East Boldon, County Durham, England
- Batting: Right-handed
- Bowling: Right-arm fast-medium

Domestic team information
- Years: Team
- 1995: Northumberland
- 1992: Sussex
- 1990–1991: Surrey

Career statistics
Competition	First-class	List A
Matches	7	19
Runs scored	3	5
Batting average	0.75	2.50
100s/50s	–/–	–/–
Top score	3	3
Balls bowled	948	906
Wickets	9	20
Bowling average	56.44	29.90
5 wickets in innings	–	–
10 wickets in match	–	–
Best bowling	4/37	3/42
Catches/stumpings	1/–	2/–
- Source: Cricinfo, 27 August 2012

Andrew George Robson (born 27 April 1971) is an English former cricketer. Robson was a right-handed batsman who bowled right-arm fast-medium. He was born at East Boldon, County Durham.

Robson made his debut for Surrey in a List A match against Derbyshire in the 1990 Refuge Assurance League, in what was his only appearance in 1990. The following season, he made his first-class debut against Essex in the County Championship at the County Ground, Chelmsford. He made a further first-class appearance for the county in 1991, against Kent. He also made three List A appearances in the Refuge Assurance League against Kent, Lancashire and Hampshire. In four List A matches for Surrey, he took 8 wickets at an average of 20.62, with best figures of 3/42. With opportunities limited at Surrey, Robson proceeded to join Surrey for the 1992 season, making his first-class debut for his new county against Hampshire in the County Championship, with him making four further first-class appearances in that season, the last of which came against Durham. In five first-class matches for Sussex, he took 8 wickets at an average of 50.62, with best figures of 4/37. In his only season with Sussex, he did feature more in limited overs cricket, making fifteen List A appearances, the last of which came against Hampshire in the 1992 Sunday League. In his limited overs appearances for Sussex, he took a total of 12 wickets at an average of 36.08, with best figures of 2/14.

He later made two appearances for Northumberland in the 1995 Minor Counties Championship, against Hertfordshire and Buckinghamshire.
