= Frederick Pierpoint =

English cricketer

Frederick George Pierpoint (24 April 1915 – 23 July 1997) was an English first-class cricketer active 1936–46 who played for Surrey. He was born in Camberwell; died in Telford.
