= Reginald Howell =

English cricketer

Reginald Howell (16 April 1856 – 3 August 1912) was an English first-class cricketer active 1878–79 who played for Surrey. He was born in Streatham; died in Esher.
