= Charles Reiner (cricketer) =

English cricketer

Charles Frederick Reiner (15 February 1884 – 9 January 1947) was an English first-class cricketer active 1906–08 who played for Surrey. He was born in Sutton, Surrey; died in Maida Vale.
