= Nick Cosh =

English cricketer (born 1946)

Nicholas John Cosh (born 6 August 1946 in Denmark Hill) is an English former first-class cricketer active 1966–69 who played for Surrey and Cambridge University.
