= Thomas Woodgate =

English cricketer

Thomas Woodgate (12 May 1857 – 30 January 1929) was an English cricketer. He was a right-handed batsman who played for Surrey. He was born in Holborn and died in Shepherd's Bush.

Woodgate made a single first-class appearance for the team, during the 1877 season, against Cambridge University. In the twelve-a-side match, he scored 11 runs in the first innings in which he batted, and a duck in the second.
