= Ronald Lowe =

English cricketer

Personal information
- Born: 28 July 1905; Shepherd's Bush, London
- Died: 29 August 1960 (aged 55); Colchester, Essex
- Source: Cricinfo, 13 March 2017

Ronald Lowe (28 July 1905 – 29 August 1960) was an English cricketer. He played ten first-class matches for Surrey in 1923.

== See also ==
- List of Surrey County Cricket Club players
