= William Taylor (Surrey cricketer) =

English cricketer

Personal information
- Full name: William Taylor
- Born: 7 May 1821; Dorking, Surrey, England
- Died: 29 March 1878 (aged 56); Kennington, Surrey, England
- Batting: Unknown
- Bowling: Unknown

Domestic team information
- Years: Team
- 1852–1855: Surrey

Career statistics
Competition	First-class
Matches	3
Runs scored	15
Batting average	3.00
100s/50s	0/0
Top score	10
Balls bowled	104
Wickets	2
Bowling average	43.00
5 wickets in innings	0
10 wickets in match	0
Best bowling	1/23
Catches/stumpings	0/–
- Source: Cricinfo, 7 May 2012

William Taylor (7 May 1821 – 29 March 1878) was an English cricketer. Taylor's batting and bowling styles are unknown. He was born at Dorking, Surrey.

Taylor made his first-class debut for Surrey against Kent at The Oval in 1852. He made two further first-class appearances for the county, against Kent at The Oval in 1853, and Sussex at the Royal Brunswick Ground in 1855. In his three first-class appearances for the county, he took a total of 2 wickets at an average of 43.00, with best figures of 1/23. With the bat, he scored 15 runs at a batting average of 3.00, with a high score of 10.

He died at Kennington, Surrey, on 29 March 1878.
