= Herbert Vigar =

British cricketer

Herbert Evelyn Vigar (29 November 1883 – 27 October 1946) was an English footballer from 1898 to 1904, and a first-class cricketer active from 1906 to 1911 who played for Surrey. He was born and died in Redhill. He played as a wicket-keeper, and served as understudy to Bert Strudwick.

== Football career ==
Vigar "had a distinguished career both as a cricketer and a footballer", though he was noted to have "made the greatest name for himself" as a cricketer. Vigar first played football for Redhill Star, where his brother Fred was a prominent member of the team. At the age of 15, Vigar joined the team, which had just lost four straight matches, and helped lead them to a win over a strong opponent. He was nicknamed "the Midget", a name which followed him in his career. An 1899 game report noted that Vigar was "as good as ever on the left, notwithstanding the close attention paid [him]. It was by splendid work that the Star 'midget' scored the only goal of the match". Turning professional, Vigar played for Wales, and then for several seasons for Norwich City F.C. He retired from the football due to ankle injuries from a Southern League match at Brighton.

== Cricket career ==
In 1904, Vigar switched from football to cricket, and was "given a trial at the Oval", where he was named captain of one of the trial teams. Though his team lost, "Vigar stood up to all the bowling in capital style and quite pleased the authorities by his display behind the sticks". On September 6, 1910, Vigar married Alice J. Smith; reporting of the marriage noted Vigar's popularity as a cricketer. The following year, Vigar began the cricket season with a strong game that was lauded in the sporting news:

Residents of Redhill and followers of the game in the district will note with feelings of satisfaction the capital manner in which H. E. Vigar got off the mark in the Surrey trial match at the Oval on Monday. Playing for Mr. A. W. F. Rutty's team, Vigar was the top scorer for his side, carrying his bat out for an excellently-compiled 46. In addition to being a first-class stumper, Vigar is frequently good for a big number of runs, and is to be congratulated upon starting the season so well.

== Death ==
Vigar died in the Royal Earlswood Institution for Mental Defectives, at the age of 62.
