= Hurst Park Club Ground =

Cricket ground in East Molesey, Surrey

Coordinates: 51.40789°N 0.35320°W

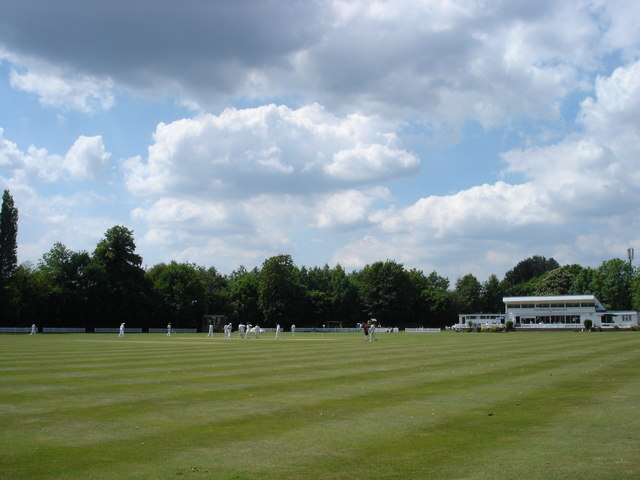

Ground information
- Location: East Molesey, Surrey
- Establishment: 1890 (first recorded match)

Team information
Hurst Park Club	(1890)
- As of 29 August 2010; Source: Ground profile

Hurst Park Club Ground is a cricket ground in East Molesey, Surrey. The ground formerly occupied the round area inside Hurst Park Racecourse. The first recorded match was in 1890 when it hosted its only first-class match between Hurst Park Club and the touring Australians. The ground moved to the far east of the park.

In local domestic cricket, the ground is the home venue of East Molesey Cricket Club. The pavilion at the ground was constructed in the 1950s.
