= Roy Lewis (cricketer) =

English cricketer (1948–2022)

Personal information
- Full name: Roy Markham Lewis
- Born: 29 June 1948; Bromley, Kent, England
- Died: 5 May 2022 (aged 73)
- Batting: Right-handed

Domestic team information
- Years: Team
- 1968–1973: Surrey

Career statistics
Competition	FC	List A
Matches	38	14
Runs scored	1746	149
Batting average	29.59	13.54
100s/50s	0/13	0/1
Top score	87	50
Balls bowled	24	24
Wickets	0	0
Bowling average	–	–
5 wickets in innings	0	0
10 wickets in match	0	–
Best bowling	–	–
Catches/stumpings	26/0	3/0
- Source: Cricinfo, 25 February 2023

Roy Markham Lewis (29 June 1948 – 5 May 2022) was an English cricketer. A right-handed opening batsman, he played 38 first-class and 14 List A matches for Surrey between 1968 and 1973.

Lewis's highest first-class score was 87 against Kent in 1969. He often played for Surrey's first team when other players were playing for England. He was a stalwart for Spencer Cricket Club in Surrey from 1968 to 1990. He was the first player in the Surrey Championship to score 10,000 runs.
