= Neville Miller (cricketer) =

English cricketer

Personal information
- Born: 27 August 1874; Shanghai, China
- Died: 3 March 1967 (aged 92); Tooting Graveney, London
- Batting: Right-handed

Domestic team information
- Years: Team
- 1899–1903: Surrey
- Source: Cricinfo, 13 March 2017

Neville Miller MC (27 August 1874 – 3 March 1967) was an English cricketer. He played nine first-class matches for Surrey between 1899 and 1903. In 1899, he scored 124 runs on first-class debut, a record for Surrey that stood until Jamie Smith scored 127 on debut in March 2019.

Miller was awarded the Military Cross for his service with the Royal Warwickshire Regiment in the First World War.

Miller was captain of Streatham Cricket Club from 1908 to 1934, having joined the club in 1903. He served as its president from December 1934 until his death.

On his death on 3 March 1967, Miller, a retired actuary, left an estate valued at £34,413.
