= George Hadfield (cricketer) =

English cricketer (1880–1935)

George Hugh Hadfield (16 July 1880 – 30 November 1935) was an English first-class cricketer active 1902–06 who played for Surrey. He was born in Edmonton, Middlesex; died in Lambeth.
