= Raymond Baker (cricketer) =

English cricketer (born 1954)

Ray Baker
Personal information
- Full name: Raymond Paul Baker
- Born: 9 April 1954 (age 72); Carshalton, Surrey
- Batting: Right-handed
- Bowling: Right-arm medium
- Role: Bowler

Domestic team information
- Years: Team
- 1973–1978: Surrey
- FC debut: 2 May 1973 Surrey v Oxford Univ.
- Last FC: 29 July 1978 Surrey v Worcestershire
- LA debut: 19 May 1973 Surrey v essex
- Last LA: 30 July 2025 Surrey v Worcestershire

Career statistics
Competition	First-class	List A
Matches	54	45
Runs scored	563	190
Batting average	21.65	13.57
100s/50s	0/2	0/0
Top score	91	48*
Balls bowled	5,572	1,769
Wickets	104	37
Bowling average	28.28	33.45
5 wickets in innings	1	0
10 wickets in match	0	0
Best bowling	6/64	4/39
Catches/stumpings	24/–	12/–
- Source: CricketArchive, 19 June 2025

Raymond Paul Baker (born 9 April 1954) is an English former cricketer who played for Surrey County Cricket Club between 1973 and 1978.

A right-arm medium-pace bowler, Baker was born at Carshalton in Surrey in 1954 and educated at Wallington High School for Boys. After playing age-group cricket for Surrey in 1972, he made his first-class and List A debuts for the side in 1973. In the summer of 1976, he was injured in a car accident and required 63 stitches to his face.

In a career that lasted until 1978, Baker played a total of 54 first-class and 45 List A matches for Surrey. He took 104 first-class wickets with a best analysis of six for 29 runs taken against Essex in 1974. This was his only senior five-wicket haul.

During the 1980s Baker played for the Metropolitan Police cricket XI. He later worked as an ECB coach based at Loughborough University.
