= Matthew Todd (cricketer) =

English cricketer (born 1983)

Matthew Julian Todd (born 25 May 1983 in Chertsey) is an English first-class cricketer active 2003 who played for Surrey. He is a right-handed batsman and a right-arm off break bowler.
