= Thomas Beard (cricketer) =

English cricketer

Thomas Arthur Beard (c. 1817–1903) was an English first-class cricketer active 1855–58 who played for Surrey. He was born in Westminster and died in Forehoe, Hampshire. He played in seven first-class matches, taking 42 wickets.
