= Nick Majendie =

English cricketer and investment manager

Personal information
- Full name: Nicholas Lionel Majendie
- Born: 9 June 1942 (age 84); Cheltenham, Gloucestershire, England
- Batting: Right-handed
- Role: Wicketkeeper

Domestic team information
- Years: Team
- 1961–1963: Oxford University
- 1963: Surrey

Career statistics
Competition	First-class
Matches	26
Runs scored	313
Batting average	11.59
100s/50s	0/1
Top score	54
Catches/stumpings	64/4
- Source: Cricinfo, 24 May 2019

Nicholas Lionel Majendie (born 9 June 1942 in Cheltenham) is a former English first-class cricketer who played for Oxford University and Surrey in the 1960s. He became an investment manager in Canada.

== Life and career ==
Nick Majendie was educated at Winchester College, where he played cricket for the school, and at Christ Church, Oxford, playing for Oxford University from 1961 to 1963. A wicket-keeper and lower-order batsman, after appearing in a few matches for Surrey late in the 1963 season he was named by the Test player Colin Cowdrey as one of the most promising young players in England: "[he did] enough to raise every eyebrow, for nothing eluded him and his obvious class became apparent to all". However, Majendie played no further first-class cricket after the 1963 season.

After receiving an MA from Oxford, Majendie moved to Canada in 1964. He became a chartered accountant with Price Waterhouse in 1967, and in 1969 entered the investment business as a research analyst. Since then he has run his own investment companies. Among other positions, he is a Director of Canaccord Genuity Corporation and Majendie Wealth Management. He has also been a frequent investment commentator in the media.
