= Harry Bush (English cricketer) =

English cricketer

Personal information
- Full name: Harry ‘thumb’ Bush
- Born: 7 October 1871; Dulwich, Surrey, England
- Died: 18 March 1942 (aged 70); Farnborough, Hampshire, England
- Batting: Right-handed
- Bowling: Right-arm medium

Domestic team information
- Years: Team
- 1901–1914: Surrey

Career statistics
Competition	First-class
Matches	72
Runs scored	2,607
Batting average	24.59
100s/50s	4/13
Top score	135
Balls bowled	204
Wickets	2
Bowling average	102.00
5 wickets in innings	0
10 wickets in match	0
Best bowling	1/12
Catches/stumpings	40/–
- Source: ESPNcricinfo, 25 April 2017

Harry Stebbing Bush CMG, (7 October 1871 – 18 March 1942) was an English first-class cricketer active 1901–14 who played for Surrey. He was born in Dulwich; died in Farnborough.

He became a Companion of the Order of St Michael and St George in 1916.
