= Charles Roller (cricketer) =

British cricketer

Charles Trevor Roller (28 February 1865 – 15 November 1912) was an English first-class cricketer active 1885–86 who played for Surrey. He was born in Clapham; died in Eastbourne.
