= John Bayley (cricketer) =

English cricketer (1794–1874)

John Bayley (17 May 1794 – 7 November 1874) was an English professional cricketer who played from 1822 to 1850. He was mainly associated with Surrey and was a member of the county team when Surrey County Cricket Club was founded in 1845. Bayley was employed by Marylebone Cricket Club (MCC) on its ground staff from 1832 to 1850 and played for the MCC team. He also played for Hampshire and Middlesex.

Bayley was a right-handed batsman and a slow roundarm bowler. He was in addition an occasional wicket-keeper. He made 83 known appearances in important cricket, including matches for The Bs (1822 to 1837), the South (1836) and the Players (1836).

== Bibliography ==
- Haygarth, Arthur (1996) [1862]. Scores & Biographies, Volume 1 (1744–1826). Kennington: Frederick Lillywhite. ISBN 978-19-00592-23-9.
- Haygarth, Arthur (1997) [1862]. Scores & Biographies, Volume 2 (1827–1840). Kennington: Frederick Lillywhite. ISBN 978-19-00592-23-9.
