= William Spicer (cricketer) =

English cricketer

William Spicer (18 May 1846 – 22 September 1892) was an English cricketer. He was a left-arm roundarm medium-pace bowler who played for Surrey. He was born in Kensington and died in Kennington.

Spicer made a single first-class appearance for the team during the 1870 season, against Yorkshire. Batting in the tailend, Spicer made 2 in the first innings and 14 in the second, and took second-innings bowling figures of 1–17.
