= List of Surrey first-class cricket records =

This is a list of Surrey first-class cricket records; that is, record team and individual performances in first-class cricket for Surrey. Surrey have played over 3,500 first-class matches since first doing so in the mid-1800s. This dwarfs the number of List A and Twenty20 matches played. Records for those shorter forms of the game are found at List of Surrey List A cricket records and List of Surrey Twenty20 cricket records. Generally, the top five in each category are listed here.

All statistics are up-to-date as of 6 August 2011.

== Listing notation ==
Team notation

- (300–3) indicates that a team scored 300 runs for three wickets and the innings was closed, either due to a successful run chase or if no playing time remained.
- (300–3 d) indicates that a team scored 300 runs for three wickets, and declared its innings closed.
- (300) indicates that a team scored 300 runs and was all out.

Batting notation

- (100) indicates that a batsman scored 100 runs and was out.
- (100*) indicates that a batsman scored 100 runs and was not out.

Bowling notation

- (5–100) indicates that a bowler has captured 5 wickets while conceding 100 runs.

Currently playing

- Record holders who are currently playing for the county (i.e. their record details listed could change) are shown in **bold**.

== Team records ==
=== Results by opponent ===
Opponent	Played	Won	Tied	Lost	Drawn	Abandoned	% Won
All England Eleven	5	2	0	1	2	0	40.00
Australian Imperial Forces	2	0	0	0	2	0	0.00
(Australia) Australians	48	9	0	20	19	0	18.75
Bangladesh A	1	0	0	0	1	0	0.00
(Bangladesh) Bangladeshis	1	0	0	0	1	0	0.00
Cambridge Marylebone Cricket Club University	2	0	0	1	1	0	0.00
Cambridge University Centre of Cricketing Excellence	1	0	0	0	1	0	0.00
Cambridgeshire	8	4	0	2	2	0	50.00
Cambridge University	123	57	0	21	45	1	46.34
CI Thornton's XI	1	0	0	0	1	0	0.00
Combined Services	5	1	0	0	4	0	20.00
Derbyshire	139	72	0	20	47	2	51.80
Durham	14	10	0	2	2	0	71.43
Durham University Centre of Cricketing Excellence	1	0	0	0	1	0	0.00
England	13	5	0	4	4	0	38.46
Essex	184	70	0	41	73	3	38.04
Gentlemen of England	3	2	0	0	1	0	66.67
Gentlemen of Philadelphia	3	2	0	1	0	0	66.67
Glamorgan	109	40	0	18	51	0	36.70
Gloucestershire	213	92	0	54	67	1	43.19
Hampshire	178	85	0	28	65	2	47.75
India A	1	0	0	0	1	0	0.00
(India) Indians	12	3	0	3	6	0	25.00
Kent and Sussex	4	3	0	0	1	0	75.00
Kent	274	104	2	64	104	0	37.96
Lancashire	210	64	1	58	87	6	30.48
Leicestershire	157	71	0	19	67	3	45.22
London County	10	3	0	3	4	0	30.00
Loughborough University Centre of Cricketing Excellence	2	0	0	0	2	0	0.00
Manchester	1	0	0	1	0	0	0.00
Marylebone Cricket Club	53	13	1	23	16	0	24.53
Middlesex	256	89	2	74	91	0	34.77
New South Wales	1	0	0	0	1	0	0.00
(New Zealand) New Zealanders	10	2	0	2	6	0	20.00
North	13	7	0	4	2	0	53.85
Northamptonshire	117	51	0	21	45	1	43.59
Nottinghamshire	240	82	0	69	89	0	34.17
Oxford University Centre of Cricketing Excellence	1	0	0	0	1	0	0.00
Oxford University	91	41	0	17	33	0	45.05
(Pakistan) Pakistanis	7	0	0	3	4	0	0.00
The Rest	3	1	0	2	0	0	33.33
Rhodesia	2	0	0	1	1	0	0.00
Scotland	4	2	0	0	2	0	50.00
Somerset	165	78	0	31	56	0	47.27
South	2	0	0	0	2	0	0.00
South Africa A	1	0	0	1	0	0	0.00
(South Africa) South Africans	16	3	0	5	8	0	18.75
Sri Lanka A	1	1	0	0	0	0	100.00
(Sri Lanka) Sri Lankans	2	1	0	0	1	0	50.00
Sussex	266	122	0	42	102	2	45.86
Warwickshire	158	59	0	29	70	3	37.34
(Cricket West Indies) West Indians	14	2	0	4	8	1	14.29
WG Grace's XI	1	1	0	0	0	0	100.00
Worcestershire	123	44	0	23	56	0	35.77
Yorkshire	239	67	0	85	87	2	28.03
(Zimbabwe) Zimbabweans	2	0	0	0	2	0	0.00
Middlesex	4	3	0	0	1	0	75.00
Yorkshire	6	4	0	2	0	0	66.67
Total	3523	1372	6	799	1346	27	38.94

=== Margins of victory ===
Margin	Opponent	Venue	Season
Innings and 485 runs	v Sussex	The Oval	1888
Innings and 468 runs	v Hampshire	The Oval	1909
Innings and 379 runs	v Somerset	The Oval	1899
Innings and 375 runs	v Somerset	The Oval	1891
Innings and 367 runs	v Oxford University	The Oval	1889
Innings and 367 runs	v Warwickshire	The Oval	1898

Margin	Opponent	Venue	Season
483 runs	v Leicestershire	The Oval	2002
388 runs	v Sussex	The Oval	1939
380 runs	v Hampshire	Southampton	1896
352 runs	v Essex	Southend	1907
343 runs	v Worcestershire	The Oval	1905

Margin	Opponent	Venue	Season
1 run	v Lancashire	The Oval	1899
1 run	v Yorkshire	The Oval	1909
2 runs	v Leicestershire	Woodbridge Road	1926
2 runs	v Hampshire	The Oval	1900
4 runs	v Warwickshire	Edgbaston	1947

=== Scores ===
Score	Opponent	Venue	Season
820-9 d	v Durham	The Oval	2025
811	v Somerset	The Oval	1899
742	v Hampshire	The Oval	1909
722-4 d	v Glamorgan	The Oval	2021
717	v Somerset	Woodbridge Road	1926
707–9 d	v Lancashire	The Oval	1990
706–4 d	v Nottinghamshire	Trent Bridge	1947

Score	Opponent	Venue	Season
14	v Essex	Chelmsford	1983
16	v Nottinghamshire	The Oval	1880
26	v Nottinghamshire	Trent Bridge	1876
27	v Gloucestershire	Cheltenham	1974
31	v Yorkshire	Holbeck	1883

== Individual records ==
=== Appearances ===
Appearances	Player	Seasons
598	(England) Jack Hobbs	1905–1934
593	(England) Tom Hayward	1893–1914
554	(England) Bert Strudwick	1902–1927
525	(England) Andrew Sandham	1911–1937
514	(England) Bobby Abel	1881–1904

=== Batting ===
==== Career ====
Runs	Player	Seasons
43,554	(England) Jack Hobbs	1905–1934
36,171	(England) Tom Hayward	1893–1914
33,312	(England) Andy Sandham	1911–1937
29,305	(England) John Edrich	1958–1978
27,609	(England) Bobby Abel	1881–1904

Centuries	Player	Seasons
144	(England) Jack Hobbs	1905–1934
88	(England) Tom Hayward	1893–1914
83	(England) Andy Sandham	1911–1937
81	(England) John Edrich	1958–1978
64	(England) Bobby Abel	1881–1904
61	(England) Mark Ramprakash	2001–2012

==== Season ====
Runs	Player	Season
3,246	(England) Tom Hayward	1906
2,849	(England) Bobby Abel	1901
2,734	(England) Tom Hayward	1904
2,499	(England) Jack Hobbs	1914
2,417	(England) Andy Sandham	1928

Centuries	Player	Season
13	(England) Tom Hayward	1906
13	(England) Jack Hobbs	1925
10	(England) Bobby Abel	1900
10	(England) Tom Hayward	1904
10	(England) Jack Hobbs	1914
10	(England) Mark Ramprakash	2007

==== Innings ====
Runs	Player	Opponent	Venue	Season
357*	(England) Bobby Abel	v Somerset	The Oval	1899
355*	(England) Kevin Pietersen	v Leicestershire	The Oval	2015
338	(England) Walter Read	v Oxford University	The Oval	1888
316*	(England) Jack Hobbs	v Middlesex	Lord's	1926
315*	(England) Tom Hayward	v Lancashire	The Oval	1898
306*	(England) Andy Ducat	v Oxford University	The Oval	1919
305	(England) Dom Sibley	v Durham	The Oval	2025
301*	(England) Mark Ramprakash	v Northamptonshire	The Oval	2006

=== Bowling ===
==== Career ====
Wickets	Player	Seasons
1,775	(England) Tom Richardson	1892–1904
1,713	(England) Tony Lock	1946–1963
1,586	(England) Percy Fender	1914–1935
1,459	(England) Alec Bedser	1939–1960
1,437	(England) Alf Gover	1928–1947

Five-fers	Player	Seasons
169	(England) Tom Richardson	1892–1904
128	(England) George Lohmann	1884–1896
123	(England) Tony Lock	1946–1963
115	(England) James Southerton	1854–1879
93	(England) Bill Lockwood	1889–1904

==== Season ====
Wickets	Player	Season
252	(England) Tom Richardson	1895
238	(England) Tom Richardson	1897
225	(England) Razor Smith	1910
202	(England) Tom Richardson	1896
196	(England) Tom Richardson	1894

Five-fers	Player	Season
32	(England) Tom Richardson	1906
30	(England) Tom Richardson	1925
24	(England) George Lohmann	1900
24	(England) Razor Smith	1904
22	(England) Tom Richardson	1914

==== Innings ====
Figures	Player	Opponent	Venue	Season
10–43	(England) Thomas Rushby	v Somerset	Taunton	1921
10–45	(England) Tom Richardson	v Essex	The Oval	1894
10–54	(England) Tony Lock	v Kent	Blackheath	1956
10–67	(England) Eddie Watts	v Warwickshire	Edgbaston	1939
10–88	(England) Jim Laker	v (Australia) Australians	The Oval	1956

=== Fielding ===
==== Career ====
Catches	Player	Seasons
605	(England) Micky Stewart	1954–1972
555	(England) Ernie Hayes	1896–1919
534	(England) Tony Lock	1946–1963
505	(England) Graham Roope	1964–1982
492	(England) Bobby Abel	1881–1904

==== Season ====
Catches	Player	Season
77	(England) Micky Stewart	1957
64	(England) Ken Barrington	1957
59	(England) Graham Roope	1971
58	(England) Tony Lock	1957
58	(England) Micky Stewart	1958

==== Innings ====
Catches	Player	Opponent	Venue	Season
7	(England) Micky Stewart	v Northamptonshire	Northampton	1957
6	(England) Graham Thorpe	v Kent	The Oval	1998
5	(England) Bobby Abel	v Hampshire	Portsmouth	1898
5	(England) Ernie Hayes	v London County	The Oval	1901
5	(England) Tony Lock	v Lancashire	Old Trafford	1953
5	(England) Stuart Surridge	v Lancashire	The Oval	1955
5	(England) Graham Roope	v Cambridge University	FP Fenner's Ground, Cambridge	1980
5	(Pakistan) Azhar Mahmood	v Worcestershire	The Oval	2006

=== Wicket-keeping ===
==== Career ====
Dismissals	Player	Seasons
1,222	(England) Bert Strudwick	1902–1927
810	(England) Ted Brooks	1925–1939
805	(England) Arnold Long	1960–1975
752	(England) Arthur McIntyre	1938–1963
615	(England) Harry Wood	1884–1900

==== Season ====
Dismissals	Player	Season
91	(England) Arnold Long	1962
87	(England) Fred Stedman	1901
81	(England) Arthur McIntyre	1949
81	(England) Ted Brooks	1933
81	(England) Arthur McIntyre	1955

==== Innings ====
Dismissals	Player	Opponent	Venue	Season
7	(England) Jonathan Batty	v Northamptonshire	The Oval	2004
6	(England) Arnold Long	v Sussex	Hove	1964
5	Achieved on eighteen different occasions			

== Partnership records ==
Partnership	Runs	Batsmen	Opponents	Venue	Season
1st	428	(England) Jack Hobbs and (England) Andy Sandham	v Oxford University	The Oval	1926
2nd	371	(England) Jack Hobbs and (England) Ernie Hayes	v Hampshire	The Oval	1909
3rd	413	(England) Darren Bicknell and (England) David Ward	v Kent	Canterbury	1990
4th	448	(England) Bobby Abel and (England) Tom Hayward	v Yorkshire	The Oval	1899
5th	318	(England) Mark Ramprakash and (Pakistan) Azhar Mahmood	v Middlesex	The Oval	2005
6th	298	(England) Andy Sandham and (England) Henry Harrison	v Sussex	The Oval	1913
7th	262	(England) Jack Richards and (England) Keith Medlycott	v Kent	The Oval	1987
8th	244	(England) Jamie Smith and (England) Jordan Clark	v Gloucestershire	Bristol	2022
9th	168	(England) Errol Holmes and (England) Edward Brooks	v Hampshire	The Oval	1936
10th	173	(England) Andy Ducat and (England) Andy Sandham	v Essex	Leyton	1921
