= List of Surrey List A cricket records =

This is a list of Surrey List A cricket records; that is, record team and individual performances in List A cricket for Surrey. Surrey have played over 900 List A matches since first doing so in 1963. Records for Surrey in first-class cricket, the longer form of the game, are found at List of Surrey first-class cricket records. Those for Twenty20 cricket are found at List of Surrey Twenty20 cricket records.

All statistics are up-to-date as of 8 August 2011.

== Listing notation ==
Team notation

- (300–3) indicates that a team scored 300 runs for three wickets and the innings was closed, either due to a successful run chase or if no playing time remained.
- (300–3 d) indicates that a team scored 300 runs for three wickets, and declared its innings closed.
- (300) indicates that a team scored 300 runs and was all out.

Batting notation

- (100) indicates that a batsman scored 100 runs and was out.
- (100*) indicates that a batsman scored 100 runs and was not out.

Bowling notation

- (5–100) indicates that a bowler has captured 5 wickets while conceding 100 runs.

Currently playing

- Record holders who are currently playing for the county (i.e. their record details listed could change) are shown in **bold**.

== Team records ==
=== Results by opponent ===
Opponent	Played	Won	Tied	Lost	No result	Abandoned	% Won
(Australia) Australians	1	1	0	0	0	1	100.00
Berkshire	1	1	0	0	0	0	100.00
British Universities	2	2	0	0	0	0	100.00
Buckinghamshire	1	1	0	0	0	1	100.00
Cambridge University	1	1	0	0	0	0	100.00
Cheshire	2	2	0	0	0	0	100.00
Combined Universities	9	8	0	1	0	0	88.89
Derbyshire	44	24	1	17	2	4	54.55
Devon	1	1	0	0	0	0	100.00
Dorset	1	1	0	0	0	0	100.00
Durham University Centre of Cricketing Excellence	19	14	0	5	0	1	73.68
Essex	64	32	0	27	5	3	50.00
Glamorgan	56	35	0	17	4	2	62.50
Gloucestershire	54	30	0	24	0	4	55.56
Hampshire	57	30	1	25	1	3	52.63
Hertfordshire	2	2	0	0	0	0	100.00
(India) Indians	1	0	0	1	0	0	0.00
Ireland	5	3	0	1	1	1	60.00
Kent	67	29	1	37	0	3	43.28
Lancashire	46	22	0	22	2	1	47.83
Leicestershire	57	27	0	20	3	0	47.37
Lincolnshire	2	2	0	0	0	0	100.00
Middlesex	61	26	1	28	6	5	42.62
Minor Counties	3	3	0	0	0	0	100.00
Netherlands	1	1	0	0	0	0	100.00
New Zealand A	1	1	0	0	0	0	100.00
(New Zealand) New Zealanders	2	1	0	1	0	0	50.00
Northamptonshire	48	24	0	21	3	1	50.00
Northumberland	1	1	0	0	0	0	100.00
Nottinghamshire	39	16	0	21	2	5	41.03
Oxfordshire	2	0	0	0	2	0	0.00
Scotland	6	6	0	0	0	0	100.00
Shropshire	1	1	0	0	0	0	100.00
Somerset	52	15	0	36	1	3	28.85
(Sri Lanka) Sri Lankans	1	1	0	0	0	0	100.00
Staffordshire	4	4	0	0	0	0	100.00
Surrey Cricket Board	1	1	0	0	0	0	100.00
Sussex	65	26	1	34	4	3	40.00
Unicorns	1	1	0	0	0	1	100.00
Warwickshire	45	24	0	21	0	4	53.33
(Cricket West Indies) West Indians	1	0	0	1	0	0	0.00
Wiltshire	1	1	0	0	0	0	100.00
Worcestershire	42	17	1	22	2	0	40.48
Yorkshire	53	30	0	23	0	2	56.60
Young Australia	1	0	0	1	0	0	0.00
Total	918	468	6	406	38	47	50.98

=== Margins of victory ===
Margin	Opponent	Venue	Season
257 runs	v Gloucestershire	The Oval	2007
205 runs	v Yorkshire	Scarborough	1994
184 runs	v Derbyshire	The Oval	1967
174 runs	v Nottinghamshire	The Oval	2001
168 runs	v Minor Counties	The Oval	1992

Margin	Opponent	Venue	Season
1 run	Occurred on ten different occasions		

=== Scores ===
Score	Opponent	Venue	Season
496–4 (Note: This represents a world record total in List A matches.)	v Gloucestershire	The Oval	2007
438–5	v Glamorgan	The Oval	2002
386–3	v Glamorgan	The Oval	2010
375–4	v Yorkshire	Scarborough	1994
361–8	v Nottinghamshire	The Oval	2001

Score	Opponent	Venue	Season
64	v Worcestershire	Worcester	1978
74	v Kent	The Oval	1967
77	v Glamorgan	Swansea	1998
80	v Kent	Canterbury	1983
82	v Lancashire	Old Trafford	1971

== Individual records ==
=== Appearances ===
Appearances	Player	Seasons
357	(England) Ali Brown	1990–2008
323	(England) Martin Bicknell	1986–2005
321	(England) Alec Stewart	1981–2002
318	(England) Pat Pocock	1977–1994
312	(England) Monte Lynch	1966–1986

=== Batting ===
==== Career ====
Runs	Player	Seasons
10,358	(England) Ali Brown	1990–2008
9,667	(England) Alec Stewart	1981–2002
7,773	(England) Graham Thorpe	1988–2005
6,833	(England) Monte Lynch	1977–1994
6,264	(England) Alan Butcher	1971–1986

Centuries	Player	Seasons
18	(England) Ali Brown	1990–2008
14	(England) Alec Stewart	1981–2002
10	(England) Mark Ramprakash	2001–2010
9	(England) Graham Thorpe	1988–2005
7	(England) Darren Bicknell	1987–1999

==== Season ====
Runs	Player	Season
1,085	(England) Darren Bicknell	1992
968	(England) David Ward	1994
952	(England) Mark Ramprakash	2002
943	(England) Ali Brown	1996
899	(England) Ali Brown	2002

Centuries	Player	Season
4	(England) Alec Stewart	1996
4	(England) Ali Brown	2001
3	(England) Darren Bicknell	1992
3	(England) Mark Ramprakash	2009

==== Innings ====
Runs	Player	Opponent	Venue	Season
268 (Note: This represents a world record score List A cricket.)	(England) Ali Brown	v Glamorgan	The Oval	2002
203	(England) Ali Brown	v Hampshire	Woodbridge Road	1997
189*	(England) James Benning	v Gloucestershire	Bristol	2006
177	(England) Scott Newman	v Yorkshire	The Oval	2009
176	(England) Ali Brown	v Gloucestershire	The Oval	2007

=== Bowling ===
==== Career ====
Wickets	Player	Seasons
409	(England) Martin Bicknell	1986–2005
399	(England) Robin Jackman	1968–1982
326	(England) Pat Pocock	1966–1986
313	(England) Adam Hollioake	1992–2004

==== Season ====
Wickets	Player	Season
48	(England) Adam Hollioake	1996

==== Innings ====
Figures	Player	Opponent	Venue	Season
7–30	(England) Martin Bicknell	v Glamorgan	The Oval	1999
7–33	(England) Robin Jackman	v Yorkshire	Harrogate	1970
6–17	(England) Adam Hollioake	v Kent	Canterbury	2003
6–22	(England) Robin Jackman	v Hampshire	Southampton	1982
6–25	(Pakistan) Intikhab Alam	v Derbyshire	The Oval	1974

=== Fielding ===
==== Career ====
Catches	Player	Seasons
121	(England) Graham Roope	1966–1982
120	(England) Monte Lynch	1974–1994
119	(England) Ali Brown	1990–2008
106	(England) Graham Thorpe	1988–2005
75	(England) Martin Bicknell	1986–2005

==== Innings ====
Catches	Player	Opponent	Venue	Season
4	(England) Monte Lynch	v Yorkshire	The Oval	1984
4	(England) Andy Smith	v Yorkshire	The Oval	1993
4	(England) Graham Thorpe	v Leicestershire	The Oval	1997
3	Achieved on forty different occasions			

=== Wicket-keeping ===
==== Career ====
Dismissals	Player	Seasons
248	(England) Alec Stewart	1981–2002
229	(England) Jack Richards	1977–1988
215	(England) Jonathan Batty	1997–2009
131	(England) Arnold Long	1963–1975
72	(Cricket West Indies) Lonsdale Skinner	1971–1977

==== Season ====
Dismissals	Player	Season
32	(England) Jack Richards	1982
30	(England) Jonathan Batty	2007
29	(England) Jack Richards	1984
28	(England) Arnold Long	1971
28	(England) Alec Stewart	1992

==== Innings ====
Dismissals	Player	Opponent	Venue	Season
7	(England) Alec Stewart	v Northamptonshire	Swansea	1994
6	(England) Alec Stewart	v Sussex	The Oval	1995
5	(England) Jonathan Batty	v Sussex	The Oval	2001
5	(England) Alec Stewart	v Sussex	The Oval	2002
5	(England) Jonathan Batty	v Sussex	The Oval	2007
5	(England) Jonathan Batty	v Sussex	Chesterfield	2008

== Partnership records ==
Wicket	Runs	Batsmen	Opponents	Venue	Season
1st	294	(England) James Benning and (England) Ali Brown	v Gloucestershire	The Oval	2007
2nd	212		v Lancashire	The Oval	1993
3rd	200		v Glamorgan	The Oval	1989
4th	181	(England) Ian Ward and (England) Adam Hollioake	v Glamorgan	The Oval	2000
5th	166		v Durham	The Oval	1982
6th	132	(England) Alec Stewart and (England) Mark Butcher	v Hampshire	The Oval	1996
7th	160*		v Lincolnshire	Sleaford	1983
8th	78*		v Derbyshire	The Oval	1998
9th	83		v Worcestershire	Worcester	1997
10th	57	(England) James Benning and (England) Neil Saker	v Gloucestershire	Bristol	2006
