= List of Surrey Twenty20 cricket records =

This is a list of Surrey Twenty20 cricket records; that is, record team and individual performances in Twenty20 cricket for Surrey. Surrey have played nearly 100 Twenty20 matches since first doing so in 2003. Records for Surrey in first-class cricket, the longest form of the game, are found at List of Surrey first-class cricket records. Those for List A cricket are found at List of Surrey List A cricket records.

All statistics are up-to-date as of 8 August 2011.

== Listing notation ==
Team notation

- (300–3) indicates that a team scored 300 runs for three wickets and the innings was closed, either due to a successful run chase or if no playing time remained.
- (300–3 d) indicates that a team scored 300 runs for three wickets, and declared its innings closed.
- (300) indicates that a team scored 300 runs and was all out.

Batting notation

- (100) indicates that a batsman scored 100 runs and was out.
- (100*) indicates that a batsman scored 100 runs and was not out.

Bowling notation

- (5–100) indicates that a bowler has captured 5 wickets while conceding 100 runs.

Currently playing

- Record holders who are currently playing for the county (i.e. their record details listed could change) are shown in **bold**.

== Team records ==
=== Results by opponent ===
Opponent	Played	Won	Tied	Lost	No result	Abandoned	% Won
Essex	12	2	0	9	1	1	16.67
Glamorgan	4	1	0	2	1	0	25.00
Gloucestershire	6	4	0	2	0	0	66.67
Hampshire	13	7	0	6	0	0	53.85
Kent	16	10	0	6	0	0	62.50
Lancashire	2	1	0	1	0	0	50.00
Leicestershire	1	0	0	1	0	0	0.00
Middlesex	16	11	0	5	0	0	68.75
Nottinghamshire	1	0	0	1	0	0	0.00
Somerset	3	2	0	1	0	0	66.67
Sussex	16	7	0	9	0	0	43.75
Warwickshire	2	1	1	0	0	0	50.00
Worcestershire	1	1	0	0	0	0	100.00
Total	93	47	1	43	2	2	50.54

=== Margins of victory ===
Margin	Opponent	Venue	Season
107 runs	v Kent	The Oval	2006
100 runs	v Sussex	Hove	2004
100 runs	v Sussex	Hove	2007
97 runs	v Glamorgan	The Oval	2019
86 runs	v Middlesex	Lord's	2013

Margin	Opponent	Venue	Season
1 run	v Lancashire	Edgbaston	2006
1 run	v Hampshire	The Oval	2006
1 run	v Kent	Canterbury	2019
2 runs	v Essex	County Cricket Ground, Chelmsford	2017

=== Scores ===
Score	Opponent	Venue	Season
224–5	v Gloucestershire	Bristol	2006
221–8	v Sussex	Hove	2004
218–7	v Middlesex	Lord's	2006
217–4	v Sussex	Canterbury	2006
203–2	v Kent	Whitgift School	2011

Score	Opponent	Venue	Season
94	v Essex	Chelmsford	2008
97	v Gloucestershire	The Oval	2010

== Individual records ==
=== Appearances ===
Appearances	Player	Seasons
144	(England) Gareth Batty	2010–2021
120	(England) **Jason Roy**	2008–2022
111	(England) Jade Dernbach	2005–2021
75	(Pakistan) Azhar Mahmood	2003–2016
74	(England) Steven Davies	2010–2016

=== Batting ===
==== Career ====
Runs	Player	Seasons
3,421	(England) **Jason Roy**	2008–2022
1,735	(Australia) Aaron Finch	2016–2019
1,719	(England) Mark Ramprakash	2003–2010
1,584	(England) Steven Davies	2010–2016
1,272	(England) **Will Jacks**	2018–2022

Centuries	Player	Seasons
4	(England) **Jason Roy**	2008–2022
4	(Australia) Aaron Finch	2016–2019

==== Season ====
Runs	Player	Season
677	(England) Jason Roy	2014
589	(Australia) Aaron Finch	2018
495	(England) Jason Roy	2016
489	(Australia) Aaron Finch	2017
398	(Australia) Aaron Finch	2019

Centuries	Player	Season
2	(England) Jason Roy	2016
2	(Australia) Aaron Finch	2018
1	(England) Jason Roy	2010
1	(England) Jason Roy	2015
1	(Australia) Aaron Finch	2017
1	(Australia) Aaron Finch	2019

==== Innings ====
Runs	Player	Opponent	Venue	Season
131*	(Australia) Aaron Finch	v Sussex	Hove	2018
122*	(England) Jason Roy	v Somerset	The Oval	2015
120*	(England) Jason Roy	v Kent	The Oval	2016
117*	(Australia) Aaron Finch	v Middlesex	The Oval	2018
114*	(Australia) Aaron Finch	v Sussex	The Oval	2017

=== Bowling ===
==== Career ====
Wickets	Player	Seasons
114	(England) Gareth Batty	2010–2021
114	(England) Jade Dernbach	2005–2021
82	(Pakistan) Azhar Mahmood	2003–2016
75	(England) **Tom Curran**	2014–2021
56	(England) **Sam Curran**	2015–2022

==== Season ====
Wickets	Player	Season
24	(England) Chris Tremlett	2010
21	(England) Nayan Doshi	2006
20	(England) Adam Hollioake	2004
19	(Australia) Dirk Nannes	2011
19	(South Africa) Imran Tahir	2019
18	(England) Jade Dernbach	2013

==== Innings ====
Figures	Player	Opponent	Venue	Season
6–24	(England) Tim Murtagh	v Middlesex	Lord's	2005
5–18	(Australia) Andrew Symonds	v Kent	Beckenham	2010
5–21	(England) Adam Hollioake	v Hampshire	Rose Bowl	2003
5–26	(England) James Ormond	v Middlesex	The Oval	2003
5–30	(England) Sam Curran	v Hampshire	The Oval	2022

=== Fielding ===
==== Career ====
Catches	Player	Seasons
59	(England) **Jason Roy**	2008–2022
38	(England) Rikki Clarke	2003–2021
34	(England) Ali Brown	2003–2008
29	(England) Gareth Batty	2010–2021
25	(England) **Rory Burns**	2012–2021
25	(England) **Tom Curran**	2014–2021

==== Season ====
Catches	Player	Seasons
10	(England) Jamie Overton	2020
9	(England) Stewart Walters	2010
9	(England) Jason Roy	2011
9	(England) Rikki Clarke	2018
8	(England) Ali Brown	2004
8	(England) Ali Brown	2005
8	(England) Jason Roy	2016
8	(England) Rory Burns	2020

==== Innings ====
Catches	Player	Opponent	Venue	Season
4	(New Zealand) Grant Elliott	v Kent	The Oval	2009
3	11 occasions			

=== Wicket-keeping ===
==== Career ====
Dismissals	Player	Seasons
49	(England) Jonathan Batty	2003–2009
48	(England) Steven Davies	2010–2016
38	(England) **Ben Foakes**	2015–2020
36	(Ireland) Gary Wilson	2008–2016
8	(England) **Jamie Smith**	2018–2022

==== Season ====
Dismissals	Player	Season
17	(England) Jonathan Batty	2006
15	(England) Steven Davies	2010
13	(England) Steven Davies	2011
13	(Ireland) Gary Wilson	2014
11	(England) Jonathan Batty	2007
11	(England) Ben Foakes	2016

==== Innings ====
Dismissals	Player	Opponent	Venue	Season
5	(Ireland) Gary Wilson	v Hampshire	The Oval	2014
4	(England) Jonathan Batty	v Sussex	Hove	2007
4	(Ireland) Gary Wilson	v Glamorgan	Cardiff	2015
3	9 occasions			

== Partnership records ==
Wicket	Runs	Batsmen	Opponents	Venue	Season
1st	194	(England) Jason Roy and (Australia) Aaron Finch	v Middlesex	The Oval	2018
2nd	139*	(England) Usman Afzaal and (England) Mark Ramprakash	v Middlesex	Lord's	2009
3rd	104	(England) Laurie Evans and (England) Sam Curran	v Somerset	Taunton	2021
4th	139	(England) Mark Ramprakash and (England) Rikki Clarke	v Gloucestershire	Bristol	2006
5th	117*	(England) Matthew Spriegel and (Ireland) Gary Wilson	v Middlesex	Lord's	2012
6th	90*	(England) Mark Ramprakash and (England) Adam Hollioake	v Hampshire	The Oval	2004
7th	79	(England) Jordan Clark and (England) Rory Burns	v Essex	Chelmsford	2019
8th	46*	(England) Zafar Ansari and (England) Tom Curran	v Middlesex	The Oval	2016
9th	38*	(South Africa) Robin Peterson and (England) Jade Dernbach	v Gloucestershire	Cheltenham	2014
10th	27	(Ireland) Gary Wilson and (South Africa) André Nel	v Essex	The Oval	2009
