= Fred Stedman =

English cricketer (1870–1918)

Cricket information
- Batting: Right-handed
- Bowling: Wicket-keeper

Career statistics
Competition	First-class
Matches	140
Runs scored	1,535
Batting average	12.37
100s/50s	0/5
Top score	62
Catches/stumpings	266/50
- Source: CricketArchive, 12 January 2023

Fred Stedman (4 March 1870 – 5 February 1918) was an English cricketer. A wicket-keeper and tail-end batsman, his first-class career extended from 1899 to 1912.

He played for Surrey from 1899 to 1908, and he was their first choice of keeper from 1900 to 1902. However Bert Strudwick then usurped his regular position in the side, and he appeared infrequently thereafter. After the 1908 season he emigrated to Ireland, where he worked as a groundsman at the Woodbrook Cricket Club Ground in Bray. He played in four fixtures on the ground which are rated as first-class, one in 1909 and three in 1912. One of the 1912 games was for Ireland against the touring South Africans. He had also appeared in two games for London County, one in 1900 and one in 1903. He stood as umpire in a single first-class match, Surrey against the touring Philadelphians in 1908.

His best year was 1901, when he made 87 dismissals (71 catches, 16 stumpings), all for Surrey. This remained a Surrey record until 1962, when Arnold Long managed 91.

He was run down and killed by a train from Bray near Woodbrook station in Dublin. Stedman was crossing the railway line when he was struck. Ironically, he was noted for protecting his chest with a copy of the South Western Railway timetable when keeping wicket. According to Bert Strudwick, once when he got hurt, Stedman said : "I shall have to catch a later train tonight; that ball knocked off the 7:30".
