= Gerald Mobey =

English cricketer

Personal information
- Full name: Gerald Spencer Mobey
- Born: 5 March 1904; Surbiton, Surrey, England
- Died: 2 March 1979 (aged 74); Woking, Surrey, England
- Batting: Right-handed
- Role: Wicketkeeper

Domestic team information
- Years: Team
- 1930–1948: Surrey

Career statistics
Competition	First-class
Matches	81
Runs scored	1,684
Batting average	18.10
100s/50s	–/6
Top score	75
Catches/stumpings	127/11
- Source: CricketArchive, 20 October 2024

Gerald Spencer Mobey (5 March 1904 – 2 March 1979) was an English professional first-class cricketer. He was a right-handed batsman and wicketkeeper.

Mobey played for Surrey from 1930 to 1948 but he was essentially their reserve wicketkeeper to Ted Brooks up to 1938 and to Arthur McIntyre in 1947 and 1948. He was first-choice wicketkeeper only in 1939 and 1946. Mobey would have toured India with the England national cricket team in 1939–40 if Marylebone Cricket Club's scheduled tour had gone ahead. The team had been selected but the outbreak of the Second World War on 3 September 1939 caused the tour's immediate cancellation.

== Bibliography ==
- Caple, S. Canynge (1959). England versus India: 1886 – 1959. Worcester: Littlebury & Co. Ltd. ASIN B001EN6QX2. OCLC 451210.
