= Jack Hobbs =

English cricketer (1882–1963)

Sir Jack Hobbs
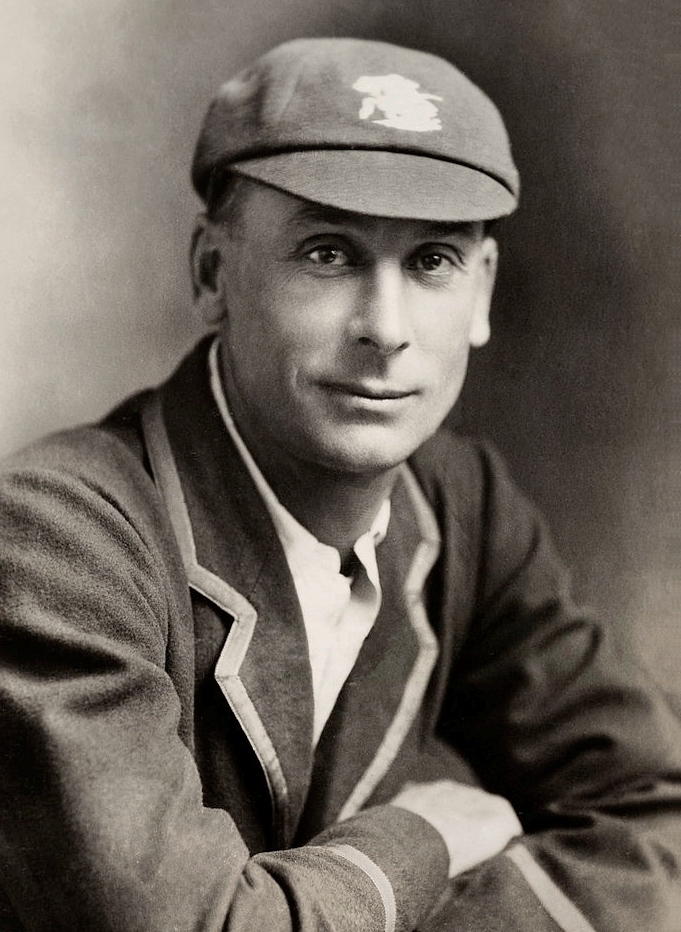
- Hobbs in about 1920

Personal information
- Full name: John Berry Hobbs
- Born: 16 December 1882; Cambridge, England
- Died: 21 December 1963 (aged 81); Hove, East Sussex, England
- Nickname: The Master
- Batting: Right-handed
- Bowling: Right-arm medium
- Role: Opening batsman

International information
- National side: England
- Test debut (cap 157): 1 January 1908 v Australia
- Last Test: 16 August 1930 v Australia

Domestic team information
- Years: Team
- 1905–1934: Surrey

Career statistics
Competition	Test	First-class
Matches	61	834
Runs scored	5,410	61,760
Batting average	56.94	50.70
100s/50s	15/28	199/273
Top score	211	316*
Balls bowled	376	5,217
Wickets	1	108
Bowling average	165.00	25.03
5 wickets in innings	0	3
10 wickets in match	0	0
Best bowling	1/19	7/56
Catches/stumpings	17/–	342/–
- Source: ESPNcricinfo, 10 March 2017

Sir John Berry Hobbs (16 December 1882 – 21 December 1963) was an English professional cricketer who played for Surrey from 1905 to 1934 and for England in 61 Test matches between 1908 and 1930. Known as "The Master", he is widely regarded as one of the greatest batsmen in the history of cricket. He is the leading run-scorer and century-maker in first-class cricket, with 61,760 runs and 199 centuries. (Note: Some sources, such as Wisden Cricketers' Almanack until recently, credit Hobbs with 61,237 runs and 197 centuries. This is because at the end of his career he played two matches whose first-class status was not accepted by Wisden and some other authorities. If those disputed matches are included, he scored 61,760 runs with 199 hundreds.) A right-handed batsman and an occasional right-arm medium pace bowler, Hobbs also excelled as a fielder, particularly in the position of cover point. Hobbs was named as one of the five Wisden Cricketers of the Century alongside Sir Donald Bradman, Sir Garfield Sobers, Shane Warne, and Sir Viv Richards.

His early batting was undistinguished, but a sudden improvement in 1901 brought him to the attention of local teams. In 1903, he successfully applied to join Surrey, with the support of England batsman Tom Hayward. His reputation grew and when he qualified to play for Surrey, he scored 88 on his first-class debut and a century in his next game. Over the following seasons, he established himself as a successful county player and in 1908 made his Test debut for England, scoring 83 in his first innings. After some mixed early performances for England, Hobbs's success against South African googly bowlers made his place secure, and by 1911–12, when he scored three centuries in the Test series against Australia, critics judged him the world's best batsman. In county cricket, he developed an attacking, dynamic style of play and was very successful up until 1914. After serving in the Royal Flying Corps during the First World War, he maintained his reputation when cricket resumed in 1919, but his career was threatened by appendicitis, which caused him to miss most of the 1921 season. When he returned, he was a more cautious batsman and used a safer style of play. Subsequently, he became more consistent and scored prolifically in both Test and domestic cricket until his retirement. During this period, he played some of his most acclaimed innings.

Hobbs's success was based on fast footwork, an ability to play many different shots, and excellent placement of the ball. Among the first batsmen to succeed against previously devastating googly bowlers, he adapted his technique to meet the new styles of bowling that arose early in his career; he mixed classical shots with an effective defence. He was particularly successful on difficult pitches for batting. An opening batsman, Hobbs established several effective opening partnerships; with Tom Hayward and Andy Sandham for Surrey and with Wilfred Rhodes and Herbert Sutcliffe for England. Despite batting against "ruthless bowlers on very hostile pitches with [fewer] safety regulations", his partnership with Sutcliffe remains in 2022 the highest average for a first-wicket partnership in Test history by a wide margin. Contemporaries rated Hobbs extremely highly, and critics continue to list him among the best batsmen of all time.

Hobbs was very close to Ada, his wife of 56 years; the pair were able to live comfortably in later life through Hobbs's substantial wage from Surrey, his commercial endorsements, and the proceeds of the sporting goods shop he opened in 1921 and ran for nearly the rest of his life. After his retirement from cricket, he also worked in journalism. Knighted in 1953—the first professional cricketer to be so honoured—he spent his later years nursing his wife. He died, aged 81, a few months after her in 1963.

== Early life ==
=== Childhood and early cricket ===
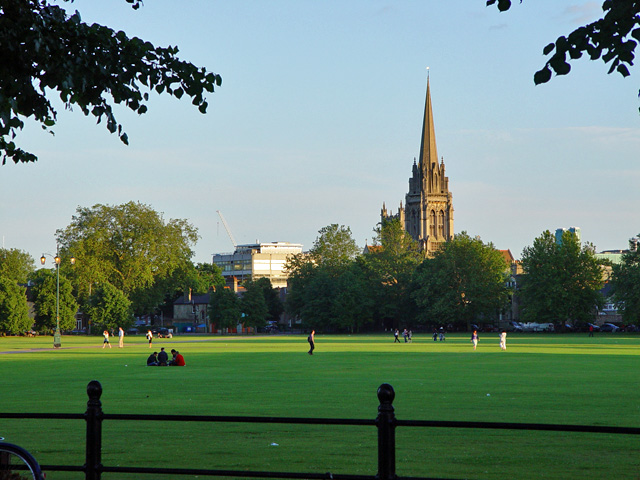
Hobbs regularly practised cricket on Parker's Piece in his youth.

Hobbs was born in Cambridge on 16 December 1882, the first of 12 children to John Cooper Hobbs, a slater, and his wife Flora Matilda Berry. Hobbs was raised in a poor, run-down area of the city, and he spent most of his childhood in near poverty. Hobbs senior, a lover of cricket, changed his career to become a professional cricketer, and in 1889 was appointed groundsman and umpire at Jesus College.

From an early age, Hobbs wished to pursue a career in cricket, and played whenever he could. His first games were played in the streets near his house. He followed his father's matches at Cambridge University colleges, and played for teams on Parker's Piece.

He was educated at a primary school affiliated with his local Anglican church, St Matthew's, and moved in 1891 to York Street Boys' School, a fee-paying establishment; Hobbs later admitted to being a poor scholar but was successful at sports. He played cricket regularly for the St Matthew's choir team and the York Street school team, and during holidays helped his father at Jesus College. In his final year at York Street, to supplement the family budget, Hobbs took a job working before school hours in the domestic service of a private house. On leaving school in 1895, he worked as an errand boy until his father's connections at the university secured him a summer job as a college servant, chiefly assisting the cricket team. Aged 16, Hobbs became an apprentice gas fitter, and practised cricket on Parker's Piece, an open area of common land in Cambridge, in his spare time. He played for various local clubs but did not initially stand out as a cricketer: although better than most other Cambridge batsmen, no coaches or major teams approached him, and his batting gave little indication of the success which came later.

Hobbs's breakthrough came in 1901. His batting improved throughout the season, during which he scored 102 for Ainsworth against the Cambridge Liberals, (Note: Hobbs played for both of these teams throughout the season.) his first century. At the end of the season, he was included in a Cambridge XI, a team chosen from the best local cricketers, to play a prestigious match against a team of professional cricketers brought by the Cambridge-born Surrey cricketer Tom Hayward. Hobbs's overall record was unremarkable, but at the end of the season he was invited to play as an amateur for Cambridgeshire; he achieved little in his appearances.

Early in 1902, Hobbs was appointed as assistant to the professional cricket coach at Bedford School, working as a groundsman and bowling in the nets. In late August, he returned to Cambridge to play as a professional for the first time. For a fee of ten shillings, Hobbs appeared for a team from the nearby town of Royston against Hertfordshire Club and Ground and scored 119 runs. His success delighted his family and made him a local celebrity. Hobbs's father, who had helped to arrange his appearance in the match, died from pneumonia a week later. Despite local fund-raising efforts for the bereaved family, Hobbs senior's death left his wife and children facing great financial hardship. Francis Hutt, a former friend and colleague of the father, contacted Essex County Cricket Club to request a trial for Hobbs. That county never replied—Hobbs later scored his maiden first-class century against them—but Hutt was more successful when he asked Hayward to look at Hobbs with a view to recommending him to Surrey. Consequently, in late 1902, Hobbs batted on Parker's Piece against Hayward and Bill Reeves, an Essex cricketer born in Cambridge, impressing Hayward in the process. In the winter of 1902–03 Hobbs assumed his father's duties as groundsman at Jesus College.

=== Surrey cricketer ===
Hobbs was summoned to Surrey for a trial in April 1903, and subsequently offered a contract with the ground staff at the Oval on a basic wage during the season of 30 shillings a week. (Note: On top of this, Hobbs received match fees. During the winter, he received a retainer of one pound each week. At the time, the average weekly wage was 28 shillings.) Hobbs could not immediately play for Surrey owing to the qualification rules in place at the time for the County Championship—a player had to be born in a county or to have lived there for two years in order to represent it. To achieve qualification, he moved to the Surrey area of London. Around this time he played football for local teams as a forward with some success, but struggled financially during the winter months and found it hard to find employment.

While qualifying, Hobbs played for Surrey's Colts side and for the Club and Ground Eleven, both of which were teams for young cricketers. Although he made some substantial scores, according to his biographer, Leo McKinstry, "just as he had done for much of his early life, [Hobbs] performed satisfactorily without doing anything startling". In the 1903 season he scored 480 runs at an average of 34.29, as well as taking 19 wickets as his bowling improved. The following season, Hobbs played only for the Club and Ground, increased his average to 43.90, and impressed people connected with the Surrey county side. His sudden improvement brought about a temporary return to the Cambridgeshire team, for which he remained qualified by birth. His batting was praised, particularly when he scored 195 and 129 in two matches against Hertfordshire. In total, he scored 696 runs in 13 innings for Cambridgeshire, averaging 58.00.

== First-class cricketer ==
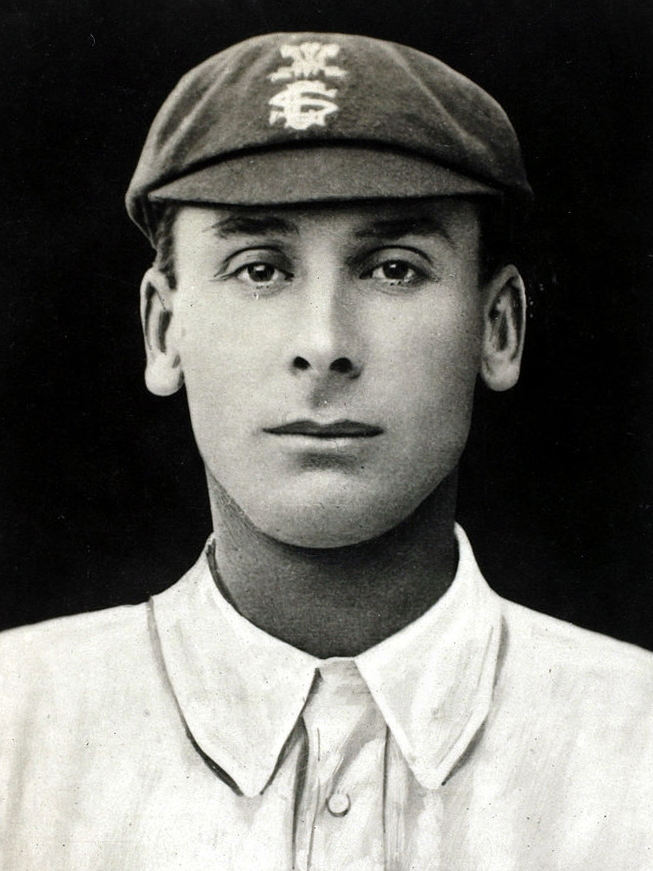
Hobbs in his early career

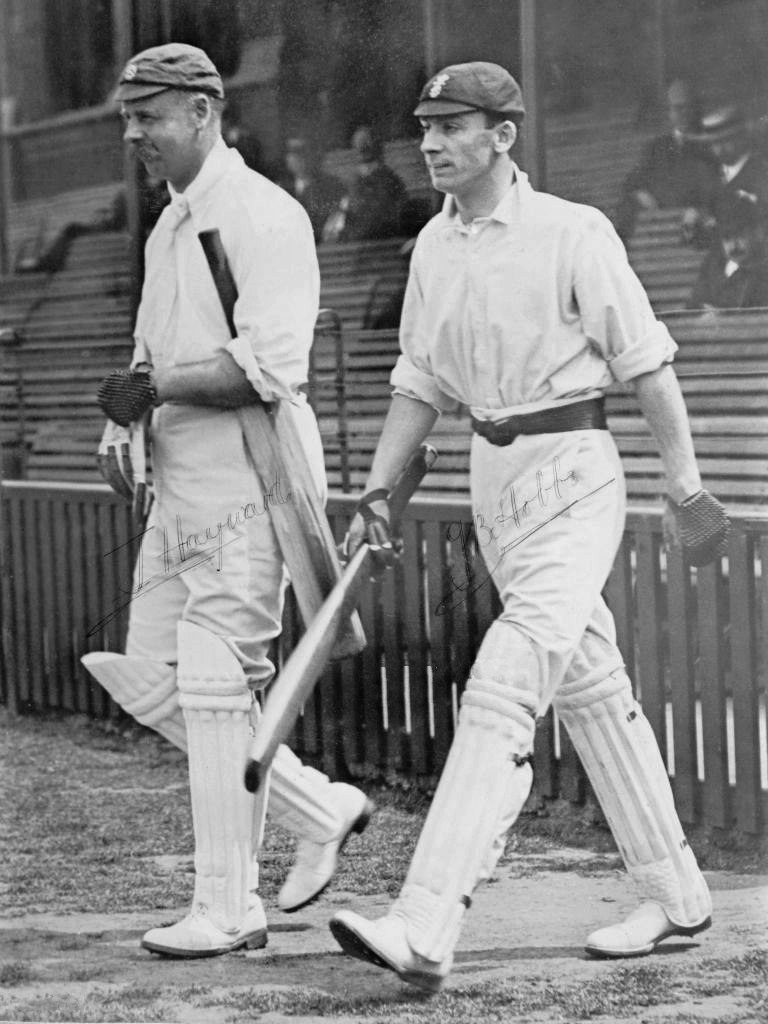
Hobbs (right) opening the batting with Tom Hayward during the County Championship match between Surrey and Warwickshire at the Oval on 2 May 1910

By the start of the 1905 season, Hobbs had qualified for Surrey and was already being noted as a player of promise. At the time, Surrey needed an opening batsman to partner Tom Hayward. Although Hobbs had rarely opened the batting, he was selected as Hayward's opening partner for Surrey's first game of the season. (Note: Hayward captained Surrey in that game—the regular, amateur Surrey captain was absent—and it was he who chose Hobbs to open.) He made his debut on 24 April 1905 against a team representing the "Gentlemen of England"; after scoring 18 runs in the first innings, he scored a rapid 88 in the second before rain ensured the match was drawn. Surrey and its committee were impressed, and Hobbs retained his place for the club's opening County Championship match against Essex. When he scored 155 runs in around three hours during Surrey's second innings, the Surrey captain Lord Dalmeny awarded Hobbs his County Cap. Over the following weeks, Hobbs scored consistently, hitting another century against Essex and 94 runs against the touring Australian cricket team. But a combination of fatigue from continuous cricket and the pressure of first-class cricket adversely affected his form, and he struggled for the remainder of the season even as the county tried various measures to help him. In first-class cricket that season, Hobbs scored 1,317 runs at an average of 25.82, including two centuries and four other scores over fifty, to finish ninth in the Surrey batting averages. As an occasional medium-paced bowler, he took six wickets. Reviewing Surrey's season, Wisden Cricketers' Almanack singled Hobbs out for attention, praising his early-season form; it suggested that he was the best professional batsman Surrey had found for a long time. The Times noted that, while performing well, Hobbs had fallen short of the standards suggested by his start.

After a winter of practice, Hobbs displayed greater consistency in 1906. Displaying a wider range of shots, he scored four centuries, including another against Essex, and established an effective opening partnership with Hayward. Between his debut and Hayward's retirement in 1914, the pair shared 40 opening partnerships in excess of 100 runs. Hobbs was generally the junior partner, and was overawed by Hayward, to the extent that he did not feel confident enough to invite him to his wedding. Hayward influenced Hobbs's mental approach, particularly his running between the wickets, but the pair were dissimilar in style. (Note: Hayward batted in the style of the late-nineteenth century, generally playing forward and driving the ball in most circumstances, and accustomed to facing fast bowlers. Hobbs, by contrast, played either forward or back depending on the delivery, used fast footwork to reach the ball, and developed methods such as leg side shots to combat new bowling strategies.) In all first-class cricket in 1906, Hobbs scored 1,913 runs at an average of 40.70 with a highest score of 162, placing him second in the Surrey averages. Wisden praised his improved fielding and commented that he was "one of the best professional bats of the year". Hobbs made further advances in 1907. Unusually frequent rain during the season—Wisden described the season as the wettest ever—meant that pitches often favoured bowlers. After a poor start, Hobbs successfully adapted to the conditions, and scored consistently well. In June, he and Hayward shared four century opening partnerships in one week. Hobbs scored four centuries in total and by the end of the season had scored 2,135 runs, averaging 37.45. He was one of only three men to pass 2,000 runs; he was second to Hayward in the Surrey averages, and eighth nationally. His performances brought him to the attention of the Marylebone Cricket Club (MCC) selectors, and he was chosen for the Players in the prestigious Gentlemen v Players matches in July, although he scored few runs in either game.

== Test match cricketer ==
=== First appearances ===
Hobbs was selected to tour Australia in the 1907–08 season with an MCC team, (Note: Throughout Hobbs's career, the MCC organised and administered English cricket. Official English touring teams always played under the name, colours and badge of the MCC and were only styled "England" during Test matches.) given his opportunity by the unavailability of several leading players. Throughout the outward voyage, Hobbs was severely affected by sea-sickness, a condition which afflicted him on sea voyages throughout his life; in later tours, he travelled overland as far as possible to reduce his time on ships. Consequently, he missed the first two games of the tour against the Australian state teams. His appearances were further limited by the reluctance of the MCC captain, Arthur Jones, to select him. He played in only two of the early matches, failing on both occasions, and was left out of the team for the first Test match. After England lost the game, Hobbs was chosen for the second Test. Hobbs made his Test debut on 1 January 1908 at Melbourne Cricket Ground. Opening the England batting on the second day, Hobbs scored 83 runs in 182 minutes. Eventually, England needed 282 to win and did so by one wicket; Hobbs scored 28. He retained his place for the rest of the series. In the fourth match, he scored 57 on a pitch badly affected by rain; by adopting a policy of attacking the bowling he hit ten fours. He concluded his series with an innings of 72 in the final game, but could not prevent a third successive English defeat—the home side won the five-match series 4–1. He scored 302 runs in the Tests at an average of 43.14. In other first-class matches, he scored centuries against Tasmania and Victoria, totalling 876 runs at 41.71.

Hobbs scored fewer runs in 1908, despite better conditions for batting. Even so, he scored 81 in the Gentlemen v Players game, achieved a batting average over 40 in the County Championship and scored six centuries for Surrey. In all first-class games, Hobbs scored 1,904 runs at 37.33. For his achievements that season, Hobbs was chosen as one of Wisden's Cricketers of the Year. The citation noted that "at the present time there is perhaps no better professional batsman in England except Hayward and Tyldesley".

Hobbs began the 1909 season with a succession of large scores, including a double century in one match and two separate centuries in another. Such form placed him in contention for a place in the team to play Australia that year, despite the English batting strength. But the England captain, Archie MacLaren, was unconvinced that Hobbs possessed the required quality. The Surrey captain and England selector H. D. G. Leveson Gower persuaded the committee to include Hobbs in the squad, then convinced a reluctant MacLaren to play him in the team. In the first Test, played at Edgbaston, Hobbs opened the batting with MacLaren but was dismissed from the first ball he received. The match was a low-scoring one, and Australia set England 105 runs to win. Hobbs, this time opening the batting with C. B. Fry, hit 62 not out and England passed the target without losing a wicket. England lost the next two matches, and Hobbs was unsuccessful, with a top-score of 30 in four innings. A badly injured finger meant that he missed the remainder of the Test series; in three games, he scored 132 runs at an average of 26.40. England lost the series when the remaining two matches were drawn. Hobbs struggled to regain his form when he recovered; he averaged 40.65 for the season, but of the 2,114 first-class runs he scored, nearly half came in the first month of the season.

=== Dominance in South Africa ===
Hobbs accepted an invitation to tour South Africa that winter with the MCC. The cricketing conditions were challenging: matches were played on matting pitches, unfamiliar to English players, and the South African googly bowlers had previously troubled most leading English batsmen, provoking debate over how batsmen could combat the new delivery. The MCC captain, Leveson Gower, selected Wilfred Rhodes to open the batting with Hobbs for the first Test. Rhodes, a defensively-minded batsman who excelled at taking quick singles, had begun his career as a bowler who batted down the order. He steadily improved his batting, eventually becoming an opening batsman. Hobbs and Rhodes, between 1910 and 1921, opened the batting 36 times for England and shared eight century partnerships; their average of 61.31 runs per opening partnership remains the second highest in Test history. In other first-class cricket, they shared a further five century opening partnerships. Their association was notable for effective running; the pair developed such an unusually good understanding that they were able to run without calling to each other. They scored singles by pushing the ball just past nearby fielders and running quickly. Critics believed that they raised the art of running to a new level.

This tactic developed from the first day that Hobbs and Rhodes batted together in the first Test; they added 159 runs for the first wicket. Hobbs scored 89 in the first innings and 35 in the second, and while England lost narrowly, he appeared much more comfortable than the other English batsmen against the googly. Hobbs and Rhodes shared a partnership of 207 in the tour match following the Test, in which Hobbs scored 163. England also lost the second Test, but Hobbs scored 53 and 70, sharing two substantial opening partnerships with Rhodes. The failure of the other batsmen, defeated by the googly bowlers, caused consternation in the English press. As England had few effective pace bowlers on the tour, Hobbs opened the bowling in the first two Tests, as well as the batting. In the third Test, he scored 93 not out to guide England to a three-wicket victory. However, the series was lost when England were defeated in the fourth match; Hobbs scored 0 and 1, the only time in his Test career that he failed to reach double figures in either innings, and his worst match return in first-class cricket. In the final game of the series, he scored his first Test hundred, opening the batting and sharing a partnership of 221 with Rhodes which was a record at the time for the first wicket in Test matches. Hobbs scored 187, an innings praised by Wisden for its "brilliancy". In this match he once more opened the bowling, dismissing Reggie Schwarz, his only Test wicket. England won the match by nine wickets and the series finished 3–2 against them. Hobbs scored 1,124 first-class runs at an average of 66.11 on the tour, while in the Test matches, he scored 539 runs at 67.37. None of the other English batsmen came close to matching his success against the googly, and by the end of the series, critics were beginning to describe him as the world's leading batsman. Wisden commented: "Beyond everything else from the English point of view the feature of the trip was the superb batting of Hobbs, who easily adapted himself to the matting wickets and scored from the famous googly bowlers with amazing skill and facility. When they came home the other members of the team could not say too much in his praise."

Fatigue from the South African tour affected Hobbs in 1910. He scored 1,982 runs at an average of 33.03, the lowest average of his career apart from his first season. More effective during 1911, after a long rest during the winter, Hobbs was consistently successful in a hot, dry summer which produced good batting pitches. He played few large innings, but was very effective in high-pressure games, and scored 2,376 runs at 41.68. Bowling more frequently than in other seasons, Hobbs took 28 first-class wickets. Against Oxford University, Hobbs bowled throughout the second innings to take seven wickets for 56 runs, the best figures of his career.

=== Success against Australia ===
Hobbs was an automatic selection for the MCC tour of Australia in the winter of 1911–12. During the first Test, which Australia won by 146 runs, Hobbs scored 63 in the first innings, although by his own admission he did not play well. Rhodes was in the team, but did not open the batting owing to his poor form; Hobbs opened with Septimus Kinneir. England recovered to win the second Test; after bowling Australia out for 184 and taking a first-innings lead of 81, the visiting team eventually faced a target of 219 to win. Hobbs and Rhodes, restored to the opening position, began with a partnership of 57. Hobbs scored 126 not out, his first century against Australia, and scored particularly well from the bowling of H. V. "Ranji" Hordern, a googly bowler who had taken 12 wickets in the first Test. Wisden commented that Hobbs "played one of the finest innings of his life", and England won by eight wickets. Australia were once more bowled out for a low score in the third Test; this time Hobbs and Rhodes added 147 for the first wicket and Hobbs scored 187. England reached a total of 501 and won the match by seven wickets.

I have long since exhausted my vocabulary of praise in favour of Rhodes and Hobbs, and, thanks in a very large degree to their superlative work, our batting was eminently successful. Too much stress cannot be laid on what they accomplished, for in innings after innings they gave us a wonderful start.

— Pelham Warner, the MCC captain in 1911–12, on Hobbs and Rhodes during the series

Having established a lead in the series, England began the fourth Test by bowling Australia out for 191. At the end of the first day, Hobbs and Rhodes had scored 54 together, and the next day they took their partnership for the first wicket to 323, setting a new record for the highest partnership for any wicket in Test matches. Their partnership remained an overall Test record for 22 years and the highest for the first wicket until 1948. (Note: The record partnership for any wicket was passed by Donald Bradman and Bill Ponsford who added 388 for the fourth wicket in 1934. Len Hutton and Cyril Washbrook established a new first wicket record of 359 in 1948.) As of 2016, this remains England's highest opening partnership against Australia. The pair scored easily from the bowling but faced criticism for slow batting. Even so, Hobbs reached a century in 133 minutes and proceeded to play more aggressively afterwards. He was finally dismissed for 178. England reached a total of 589 and bowled Australia out for 173 to win the match by an innings and regain the Ashes. England also won the final Test to take the series 4–1; Hobbs scored 32 and 45, sharing a partnership of 76 with Rhodes in the second innings. Hobbs ended the series with an aggregate of 662 runs at an average of 82.75, setting a new record number of runs for an individual batsman in a Test series. His average was far greater than any other batsman on either team, and the tour established him as the world's best batsman. In addition, in all first-class matches he ran out 15 batsmen while fielding at cover point. The Australians did not dare run when he fielded the ball for fear of the speed of his throw. In all first-class matches, Hobbs scored 943 runs at 55.47.

The 1912 season was unusually wet, which resulted in some very difficult pitches for batting. Wisden remarked that Hobbs did not bat particularly well for Surrey. The press criticised him for trying to score too quickly and losing his wicket in the process. During the summer, both Australia and South Africa toured England, taking part in the Triangular Tournament. Hobbs made a slow start to the competition when he was bowled in the first over in England's opening match, and his form was uncertain in the early part of the season. However, he scored a century against Australia at Lord's Cricket Ground on a very difficult batting pitch in England's second game, sharing a partnership of 112 with Rhodes. He continued with scores of 55 and 68 in the next two games against South Africa, and his batting was praised by the press; for the first time, in the Times, he was referred to as "a great master". South Africa were defeated in five of their six games (the other was drawn). As the first two games between England and Australia were drawn, the final match was designated as the deciding match for the tournament. Hobbs and Rhodes opened with 107, and Hobbs scored 66. These runs were crucial and England won the game by 244 runs. Hobbs had the best batting average for the summer from all three teams; he averaged 40.75 against South Africa and 56.00 against Australia. In all first-class cricket his aggregate was 2,042 runs at 37.81.

=== Years before the war ===
In 1913, batting in a more controlled fashion, Hobbs scored 2,605 runs at an average of 50.09, placing him second in the national averages. He continued to score quickly, twice scoring 100 runs before lunch on the first day of a match; against Worcestershire, he and Hayward shared an opening partnership of 313 in 190 minutes. In the winter of 1913–14, the MCC sent a strong team to South Africa. The opposition team lacked effective players, and England won the five-Test series 4–0, mainly as a result of the bowling of Sydney Barnes. Hobbs scored 443 runs at an average of 63.28 in the series; he did not score a century, but accumulated scores of 82, 92 and 97, while he and Rhodes shared two century opening partnerships and another of 92. Hobbs adopted a cautious approach, and Wisden noted that he was "not quite so brilliant as in England" but said that he was "an absolute master on matting wickets [pitches]." In all first-class matches, he scored 1,489 runs at 74.45.

After a slow start to the 1914 season, Hobbs recorded a string of centuries, including a score of 226, his highest at that time. The looming First World War overshadowed much of the season. Cricket initially continued once the war began, but as the Oval had been requisitioned by the military, Hobbs's benefit match was moved from the Oval to Lord's. This move, and the public's preoccupation with the war, consigned the game to a financial failure; in total, Hobbs's benefit raised £657 (£80,663 in 2021 terms), lower than most benefits and far less than usually raised for cricketers of Hobbs's standing. The Surrey committee agreed to give him another benefit when the war concluded. Hobbs scored his 11th century of the season before public pressure terminated the cricket season. During the winter, the MCC declared Surrey as County Champions; although the war prevented the completion of all the matches, Surrey led comfortably enough for the other counties not to object. This was the only time in Hobbs's career that Surrey were champions. In all first-class games in 1914, he scored 2,697 runs at 58.63. As the war began, Hobbs reputation was at its peak; he was described by Wisden as "one of the greatest bats of his generation". McKinstry states that during the season: "With his free-scoring method, [Hobbs] had dazzled in a way that he was never to do again."

== First World War ==
Unlike many other cricketers, Hobbs did not immediately join the army, but worked in a munitions factory, possibly as a clerk. Writing later, Hobbs related that he was criticised for not joining up, but suggested he did not realise how serious the war would be, and was conscious of the need to care for his family. From March 1915 he found extra work as coach at Westminster School, and in May began to play on Saturdays as a professional for Idle in the Bradford Cricket League. The continuation of competitive cricket in Bradford, when all other such cricket had ceased, was controversial. Several clubs hired top-class professionals and matches became very popular. Although his arrival was eagerly anticipated, Hobbs never reached the expected heights, averaging 36.63 throughout the 1915 season. But his signing provoked an angry exchange of correspondence between the Yorkshire president Lord Hawke, who was highly critical of the employment of professionals, and John Booth, the president of the Bradford League. Hobbs never publicly commented on the matter, but was instrumental in recruiting Frank Woolley to play in the league. He continued to play for Idle in 1916, and was more successful, scoring 790 runs at 52.60 and taking 65 wickets at 6.27. But his conscription after the season into the Royal Flying Corps ended his regular cricket in the league.

Hobbs joined the Corps in October 1916 as an air mechanic and after training was posted to London, then Norfolk; at first he had time to appear in charity cricket matches and in several games for Idle. In November 1917, he joined 110 Squadron which remained in England despite plans to send it to France. By 1918, the cricket authorities began to arrange more matches and Hobbs played successfully several times at Lord's. In September 1918, 110 Squadron, as part of the newly formed Royal Air Force (RAF), was sent to France and took an active part in the fighting, but Hobbs never discussed his career in the RAF. Even so, some of his family remained critical and felt that the worst of the war was over when Hobbs went to France. He was demobilised in February 1919, three months after the Armistice with Germany which ended the war.

== Career after the war ==
=== Resumption of cricket ===
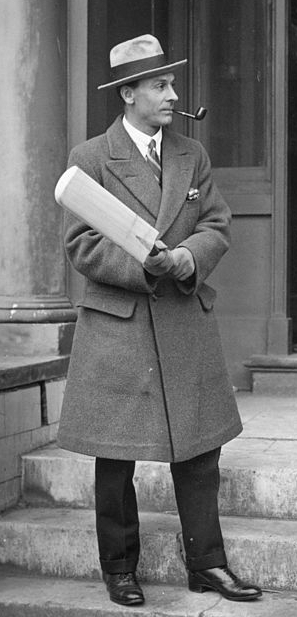
Hobbs in 1922

When first-class cricket resumed in 1919, Surrey awarded Hobbs a five-year contract worth £400 a year (£24,185 in 2021 money). During the season, he began to open the batting with Andy Sandham, who succeeded to Hayward's position as Hobbs's partner; in the following years, the pair established an effective partnership. In total, they shared 66 century opening partnerships and averaged over 50 for the first wicket. (Note: Although Hobbs and Sandham played three Test matches together, they never opened the batting in these matches, and shared just one partnership.) Like Hobbs's other successful partnerships, this one was based on quick running. Sandham, even when successful, was often overshadowed by his partner; on one occasion, Sandham scored a century but the headlines were reserved for Hobbs's duck. Sandham usually played the subordinate role and Hobbs took most of the bowling.

Hobbs made a good start to the 1919 season and, despite a brief spell of failure through over-aggression, batted consistently. He scored a double century for Surrey against a touring Australian Imperial Forces cricket team and centuries in each of the three Gentlemen v Players matches—the only player ever to do so in one season. His rescheduled benefit match raised £1,670 (£91,750 in 2021 terms), money he used to open a sports shop in London. The shop was successful, and he ran it until just before his death. The additional income gave him considerable financial independence. In total that year, Hobbs scored 2,594 runs in first-class matches, more than anyone else, at an average of 60.32. After a winter working in his shop, his good form continued into 1920. Four of his eleven first-class centuries came in consecutive innings in June, and he totalled 2,827 runs at 58.89. He also took five wickets for 21 runs against Warwickshire, and his 17 wickets at an average of 11.82 placed him at the top of the Surrey bowling averages.

Hobbs toured Australia with the MCC during the 1920–21 season, under the captaincy of J. W. H. T. Douglas, when Australia won every match of the five-Test series. He was one of the few English successes. He scored two centuries in the opening three first-class games, and in the first Test top-scored in both England innings with 49 and 59. In the second Test, he scored 122 on a difficult pitch which had been affected by rain. Wisden commented that this was "from the English point of view, the finest innings of the tour". He also scored a century in defeat in the third Test, hitting 123 in the final innings as England failed to score 489 to win the game. He did not pass 50 again in the series; after a failure on the fourth Test, he tore a thigh muscle batting in a game before the final Test. Persuaded by Douglas to play anyway, he scored 40 and 34 but struggled to field effectively. One unsuccessful attempt to chase the ball caused some of the crowd to jeer him, which led to controversy when two amateur members of the team, Percy Fender and Rockley Wilson, wrote scathingly about the incident. Hobbs scored a total of 924 first-class runs on the tour, at an average of 51.33; in Test matches, he scored 505 runs at 50.50. Although he and Rhodes resumed their opening partnership, apart from in the first Test, when C. A. G. Russell partnered Hobbs, they could not replicate their former successes, and shared only one stand worth more than fifty.

Hobbs played just five first-class matches in 1921, when Australia toured England. In his opening first-class game, he played against the touring team, but tore the same thigh muscle injured in Australia. He missed the opening two Tests, but once recovered, scored a century for Surrey; as England trailed 2–0 in the five-Test series, the selectors chose him for the third Test. In the days approaching the match, played in Leeds, he suffered from increasing stomach pain but reluctantly played. On the first day of the match, he had to leave the field, and after a day of rest the pain worsened. He consulted Sir Berkley Moynihan, a prominent surgeon based in Leeds, who diagnosed acute appendicitis and operated the same day. In the opinion of the surgeon, Hobbs would not have lived another five hours without surgery. He missed the rest of the season.

Hobbs returned to cricket in 1922 and batted effectively throughout the first months of the season, scoring 10 first-class centuries in total. One of the centuries came in the Gentlemen v Players match at Lord's, in which he captained the Players team for the first time. Towards the end of the season, his form faded owing to the lingering effects of his illness and operation the previous year. Wisden observed that he frequently tired during longer innings and often tried to get out soon after reaching three figures; this habit of giving up his innings continued throughout the remainder of his career. The season also marked a turning point in his batting approach where he preferred to score more slowly and take fewer risks, in contrast to his adventurous pre-war tactics. Second in the national batting averages for 1922, he scored 2,552 runs at an average of 62.24, but declined an invitation to tour South Africa that winter with the MCC. Less successful during the wet 1923 season, Hobbs failed on many occasions and was unsuccessful in both Gentlemen v Players games. He was still struggling with the after-effects of his operation and Wisden noticed he once more tried to score too quickly early in an innings. However, against Somerset, he scored the 100th century of his first-class career, the third man to reach the landmark after W. G. Grace and Hayward. Overall in the season, he scored 2,087 runs at 37.95.

=== Partnership with Sutcliffe ===
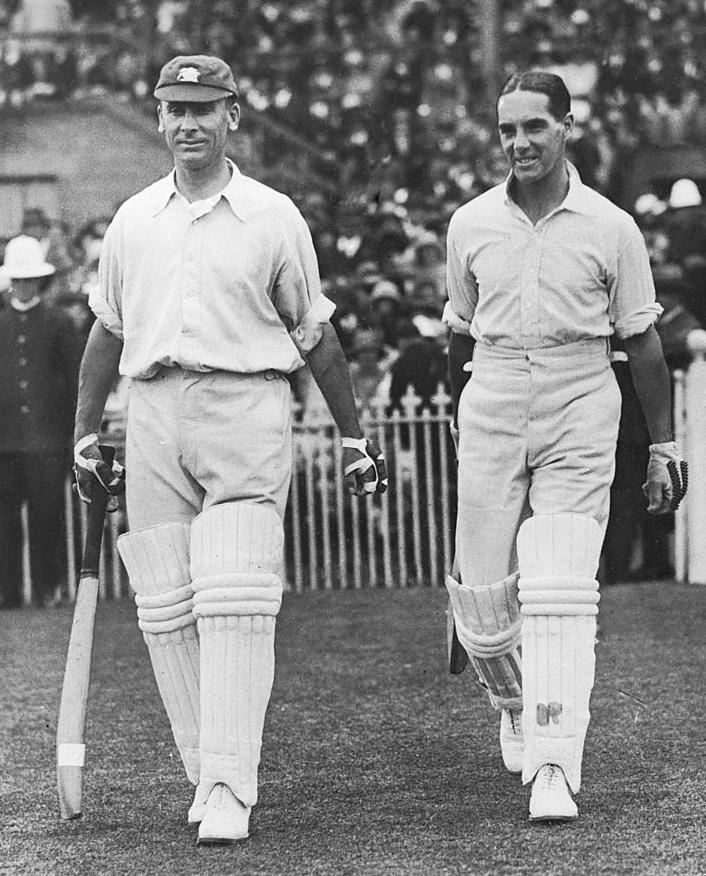
Hobbs (left) and Sutcliffe opening the batting in Melbourne, Australia, during the second Test in February 1925

Hobbs signed a new contract worth £440 (£28,463 in 2021 terms) a season before the 1924 season. His form recovered to the extent that his biographer, John Arlott, described it as the beginning of "his quite phenomenal second lease of cricketing life". Batting conditions were good throughout the summer and Hobbs's opening partnership with Sandham for Surrey began to approach its peak of effectiveness. Hobbs also established an opening partnership with Yorkshire's Herbert Sutcliffe; the pair had opened together briefly in previous seasons and were chosen to open in a Test trial early in 1924, beginning a six-year Test association. They were often successful in difficult batting conditions; Hobbs, generally the dominant partner, usually faced more of the bowling. By the time of his retirement, they had opened the batting 38 times in Tests, shared 15 century opening partnerships, and added 3,249 runs together; their average partnership was 87.81, the highest in all Tests for a pair of opening batsmen as of 2016. (Note: The second best average opening partnership in Tests among pairs that have scored over 2,000 runs is that of 61.31 between Hobbs and Rhodes.) In all first-class matches, they had added 100 for the first wicket 26 times and had an average partnership of over 77. As with Hobbs's other partnerships, they ran well between the wickets, and established a particular reputation for reliability; according to McKinstry, they became an "English institution". The cricket writer Gerald Howat suggests that "'Hobbs and Sutcliffe' became almost a synonym for English stability."

Following their success in the 1924 trial match, Hobbs and Sutcliffe were selected for England to play the first Test against South Africa. When England batted first, the pair added 136 for the first wicket; Hobbs, playing a Test innings in England for the first time since 1912, scored 76. England won the match by a large margin. In the second Test, Hobbs and Sutcliffe opened with 268 runs for the first wicket; Hobbs scored 211, his highest Test score. At the time, the innings was the highest played at Lord's in a Test and equalled the highest in a Test match in England. England scored 531 for the loss of two wickets and won the match by an innings. Having initially declined an invitation to tour Australia with the MCC in the coming winter, Hobbs was left out of the team for the fourth Test. After the MCC accepted his request to allow his wife Ada to accompany him—the wives of professionals were not usually permitted to tour—he changed his mind, and was added to the team for the fifth Test. In the series, he scored 355 runs at an average of 71.00, while in all first-class matches he totalled 2,094 runs at 58.16. He finished second in the national averages, and the cricket press noted that, although Hobbs scored more slowly and in less spectacular fashion than previously, he batted in a safer, secure style which was more successful in terms of run-scoring.

The MCC team which toured Australia under the captaincy of Arthur Gilligan in 1924–25 lost the Test series 4–1, but critics thought the winning margin flattered the host country. Between them in the Test matches, Hobbs and Sutcliffe scored seven centuries and shared four opening partnerships which passed 100 runs. Hobbs began the tour well, and scored consistently in the matches before the Tests. In the first Test, in reply to Australia's first innings of 450, Hobbs and Sutcliffe opened with 157 runs. Hobbs went on to his seventh century against Australia, beating the previous record number in England-Australia Tests by Victor Trumper. Australia eventually set England a target of 605 runs. Hobbs and Sutcliffe shared their second century opening partnership of the game, but England lost by 193 runs. During the match, Hobbs became the leading run-scorer in Test cricket, passing the previous record of 3,412 runs set by Clem Hill in 1912. In the second Test, Australia scored 600 during the opening two days. In reply, Hobbs and Sutcliffe batted throughout the third day without being separated, scoring 283. They concentrated on defence but both men reached centuries, and the press praised their achievements. Even so, Australia won the game by 81 runs, and in the aftermath of the defeat, Cecil Parkin, a former Test bowler and vocal critic of Gilligan's captaincy, wrote a newspaper article suggesting that Hobbs should assume the leadership of the side. This suggestion provoked a reaction from Lord Hawke—"Pray God, no professional will ever captain England"—and subsequent press debate over the idea of Hobbs as captain. (Note: Traditionally, captains in English county and Test cricket were amateurs, who usually came from privileged backgrounds, in contrast to professionals, who often came from the working classes. Consequently, class distinction pervaded cricket which was organised and administered by former and current amateurs, many of whom reasoned that professionals would not make good captains owing to their worries over safeguarding their contracts or concerns about affecting the livelihoods of other professionals.) In reality, Hobbs had no desire to captain England.

Australia once more batted first in the third Test, scoring 489. For tactical reasons, Hobbs did not open the batting but scored 119 and shared another century partnership with Sutcliffe. Wet weather altered the course of the match and, despite an opening partnership of 63 between Hobbs and Sutcliffe, Australia won by 11 runs. The opening batsmen shared their fourth century partnership of the series in the fourth Test as England won by an innings, but Australia won the final match to win the series 4–1 and in a heavy defeat, Hobbs failed in both innings. In the series, he scored 573 runs at an average of 63.66, and made two half-centuries in addition to his three hundreds. Critics in Australia and England once more recognised him as the leading batsman in the world. Hobbs and Sutcliffe far outscored the remaining MCC batsmen and Wisden judged that with better support from other batsmen they could have won the series. In all games, Hobbs scored 865 first-class runs at 54.06.

=== Peak of popularity ===
Hobbs was particularly successful in 1925. Early in the season a string of centuries, including a run of four in consecutive innings, made him the first batman to reach 1,000 runs that season and brought him close to Grace's record of 126 first-class hundreds. He scored the 125th century of his career against Kent on 20 July, but amid intense press and public interest, Hobbs lost form through a combination of anxiety and fatigue. He continued to score well, but could not reach three figures in an innings—after one innings of 54, a newspaper headline proclaimed that "Hobbs Fails Again". It was not until 15 August, against Somerset, that Hobbs scored 101 to reach the landmark, an achievement praised and feted throughout the country over the following weeks. On the final day of the match, Hobbs scored another century to become the outright record holder. He ended his season with an innings of 266 in a Gentlemen v Players match at the Scarborough Festival, his highest to date and the best score made in the Gentlemen v Players series, and 104 for the Rest of England against Yorkshire, the County Champions. In total, he scored 16 centuries—setting a record for most centuries in a season—and totalled 3,024 runs at an average of 70.32 to top the national averages for the first time. Following his successful season, Hobbs was in great demand. He attended several functions in his honour but rejected offers to appear on stage, in film and to stand as a Liberal parliamentary candidate.

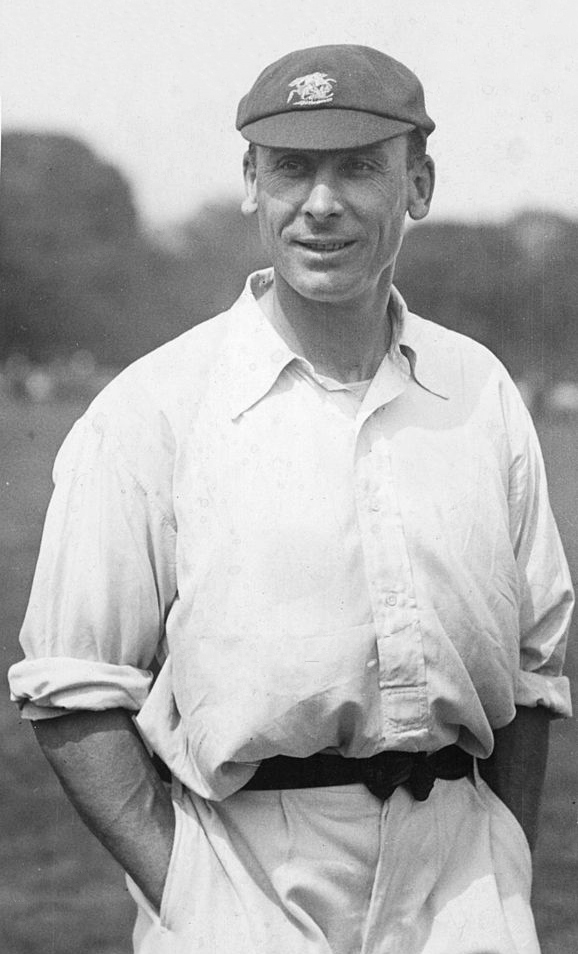
Hobbs c. 1925

Hobbs was given a third benefit by Surrey in 1926, which raised £2670 (£173,651 in 2021 terms). Further recognition came when he and Rhodes joined the England selection committee for the Ashes series to be played that summer; for professional cricketers to serve as England selectors was unprecedented. Hobbs began the season well, and after the first Test, which was badly affected by rain, he remained in form by scoring 261 against Oxford University, sharing an opening partnership of 428 with Sandham; this remained a Surrey first wicket record as of 2016. In the drawn second Test, he and Sutcliffe shared an opening stand of 182. Hobbs scored 119 but was criticised for slowing down later in his innings, leading to accusations that he was more concerned with reaching three figures than batting for the team. The third Test was also drawn. England followed on in the face of a large Australian total, but Hobbs and Sutcliffe opened the second innings with a partnership of 156 and Hobbs scored 88 as the game was saved. During the fourth Test, he temporarily assumed the captaincy when Arthur Carr withdrew from the match owing to illness; Hobbs became the first professional to captain England at home. The selectors and players on both teams believed Hobbs performed well tactically. He scored 74 in England's innings, but heavy rain ensured a fourth successive draw.

As everything depended on the final game, the Imperial Cricket Conference agreed that the match be played to a finish. Carr was replaced as captain by Percy Chapman, a decision which proved controversial in the press; Rhodes was also recalled to the team, aged 48. Amid huge public interest, the match was evenly balanced at the end of the second day when England began their second innings. Overnight rain seriously damaged the pitch before the third morning and few critics—including members of the home team—expected England to score many runs. But Hobbs and Sutcliffe, who had scored 49 on the second evening, began to bat confidently before the effects of a hot sun drying a damp pitch made batting even more hazardous. Concentrating on defence, but scoring whenever possible, the pair added 172 in total. Immediately after reaching 100, Hobbs was out and received a prolonged ovation from the crowd. Many critics believed that, given the conditions, match situation and pressure, this was his greatest innings. England built up a large lead and bowled Australia out to win the Ashes. Late in the season, Hobbs made the highest score of his career, 316 not out for Surrey against Middlesex at Lord's, establishing a record individual innings for Lord's which survived until 1990. In total, Hobbs scored 2,949 runs at 77.60, including 12 centuries, to be placed first in the national batting averages.

Hobbs missed a large part of the 1927 season with a combination of illness and injury. In between his absences, he performed well, although he was left out of the Gentlemen v Players match. He scored 1,641 runs at 52.93, including seven centuries. He began the 1928 season with four centuries in the first month, but another leg injury kept him out of cricket for six weeks. When he recovered, he was selected in the last two of the three Tests against the West Indies, playing their first Test series. In his first game, he and Sutcliffe shared a century partnership; in the third, Hobbs scored 159, having opened with a 155-run partnership with Sutcliffe. England won the series 3–0. Hobbs maintained his batting form until the end of the season; he finished second in the batting averages, scoring 2,542 runs at an average of 82.00 and hitting 12 centuries. Critics believed he remained unsurpassed among English batsmen.

=== Final Tests ===
Hobbs toured Australia for a final time as a player in 1928–29 as part of a strong MCC team, and despite substantial scores in early games, did not bat well. He made little contribution to England's victories in the first two Tests, and some critics noticed a decline in his batting, a judgement reinforced when he was out to a poorly-chosen shot in the first innings of the third Test for 20. Australia were able to build up a substantial lead, and overnight rain before the sixth day of the match made them likely winners. England needed 332 to win, but on a pitch growing more difficult as it dried, a total of 100 was considered unlikely. Hobbs and Sutcliffe survived to add 105 for the first wicket; observers praised their technique against the turning ball, although the Australian bowlers were criticised for ineffective tactics. Hobbs was out for 49; at his suggestion, Douglas Jardine came in to bat next, and England reached the end of the day having lost just one wicket for a score of 199. Next day, the team won the game to take a 3–0 lead in the series with two to play and ensure they retained the Ashes. In the fourth Test, Hobbs scored 74 and shared a partnership of 143 with Sutcliffe as England won by 12 runs; in the final game, won by Australia, he scored 142 on the first day, his final Test century and 12th against Australia. Scoring his hundred at the age of 46 years 82 days, he remained as of 2016 the oldest player to score a Test century. In first-class games on the tour, Hobbs scored 962 runs at 56.58. and 451 runs at 50.11 in the Tests.

Hobbs missed more cricket with injuries and illnesses in 1929; between 1926 and 1930, he missed more than a third of Surrey's matches. However, he scored heavily and compiled 2,263 runs at an average of 66.55 to lead the first-class averages. Unfit for the first two Tests against South Africa, he chose to miss the next two, and played in the final game, scoring 10 and 52. Critics observed a general slowing in Hobbs's scoring throughout the season, and he scored more often in singles than in his earlier years.

Hobbs began 1930 in good form, and, with Rhodes, was added to the selection panel again for the Ashes series that season. In the first Test, Hobbs scored 78 and 74; he top-scored in both innings, but failed in the next two Tests. Before the third and fourth Tests, feeling tired and concerned by his form, he offered to stand down but the other selectors declined his suggestion. When he batted in the fourth Test, he shared an opening partnership of 108 with Sutcliffe, their 11th century stand against Australia. After two hours batting, he was out for 31. With the series level at 1–1, the final Test was to be played to a finish, but before it began, Hobbs announced that it would be his last. Shortly after making the decision, he returned to form, scoring a century and passing, in his next game, W. G. Grace's record career-aggregate of 54,896 first-class runs. Before the deciding Test, the selectors sacked Percy Chapman as captain. The press speculated that Hobbs would replace him, but Bob Wyatt was chosen; Hobbs may have turned down an offer of the captaincy at the meeting of selectors. (Note: The News Chronicle newspaper reported that Hobbs had declined the captaincy, and a story circulated among county cricketers that such an offer had been made. Sutcliffe later told a team-mate that he was "disappointed" that Hobbs turned it down. The chairman of selectors, Leveson Gower, was a longtime supporter of Hobbs, which makes such a story plausible, according to McKinstry.) In the match, Hobbs scored 47 in the first innings. When he came out to bat in the second, in the face of a large Australian first-innings lead, Hobbs was given an ovation by the crowd and the Australian fielders gave him three cheers. Hobbs was moved by his reception but scored only nine runs before he was dismissed, and Australia won the match and series. In his final series, he scored 301 runs at 33.44. In 61 Tests, he had scored 5,410 runs at an average of 56.94. He retired as the leading run-scorer in Test matches, a record he held until it was passed by Wally Hammond in 1937. Maintaining his form for the rest of the season, Hobbs scored 2,103 first-class runs in 1930 at 51.29.

=== End of career ===
During the winter of 1930–31, Hobbs and Sutcliffe joined a private team run by the Maharajkumar of Vizianagram which toured India and Ceylon. Hobbs was very popular with the crowds, and scored 593 runs. These runs, and in particular the two centuries he scored, were to prove controversial. Hobbs never believed that the matches were, or should have been, of first-class status, but statisticians later judged them to be first-class. Wisden never recognised the centuries and so records his century total as 197. Other authorities give 199 centuries. Despite using a more limited batting technique, Hobbs remained successful in 1931. He played several representative matches and took part in the 150th century opening partnership of his career. In total, he scored 2,418 first-class runs in the season at 56.23. In 1932, despite missing several matches owing to injuries and fatigue, he scored 1,764 runs at 56.90, including centuries in each innings against Essex. According to Mason, this latter performance prompted Douglas Jardine to coin the nickname "The Master" for Hobbs. Hobbs scored 161 not out for the Players against the Gentlemen, his 16th century in the fixture, to pass the record total of WG Grace for the Gentlemen.

Hobbs was partially involved in the Bodyline controversy in Australia in 1932–33. Late in the 1932 season, Bill Bowes consistently bowled short-pitched deliveries against him in a match between Surrey and Yorkshire. Bowes was criticised in the press and particularly by Pelham Warner, who was to manage the MCC team in Australia. Hobbs accompanied the team to Australia as a journalist, writing for the News Chronicle and The Star, accompanied by his ghostwriter Jack Ingham. During the tour, Hobbs neither condemned Bodyline nor fully described the English tactics. Other journalists admired Hobbs but dismissed his writing as "bland". When he returned to England, Hobbs openly criticised the English tactics in newspaper columns and in a book he wrote about the tour. In 1933, playing less frequently, he scored 1,105 runs at 61.38, aged 50. After missing the first games with illness, he scored 221 against the touring West Indian team, to the acclaim of the press. He did not play every game, and the Surrey committee allowed him to choose which matches to play. More centuries followed later that season, which took him to 196 in his career, fuelling anticipation that he would reach 200 centuries. That winter he accompanied the MCC team in India as a journalist. Before the next season, Surrey constructed a new entrance to the Oval which was named after Hobbs. In 1934, he scored 624 runs at 36.70. After a solid start, he scored his final first-class century against Lancashire. After this he played irregularly, and his batting began to appear uncomfortable. Hobbs realised his career was over: in February 1935, he announced his retirement. There were many tributes and a public dinner was held in his honour which was attended by many leading figures in cricket. In all first-class cricket, Hobbs scored 61,760 runs at an average of 50.70 according to Cricinfo. Later in 1935, Hobbs was made an honorary life member of Surrey.

== Style and technique ==
On all kinds of pitches, hard and dry, in this country or in Australia, on sticky pitches here and anywhere else, even on the "gluepot" of Melbourne, on the matting of South Africa, against pace, spin, swing and every conceivable device of bowlers Hobbs reigned supreme.

— Obituary of Hobbs by Neville Cardus

For much of Hobbs's career, critics judged him to be the best batsman in the world. E. W. Swanton described him in 1963 as "a supreme master of his craft, and the undisputed head of his profession". Neville Cardus said that Hobbs was the first batsman to develop a technique to succeed consistently against googly bowlers, and that he mastered all types of bowling, all over the world and in a variety of conditions. Other critics have suggested that Hobbs moved the focus of batting from aesthetic off side shots to leg side play more suited to swing and googly bowling. Swanton wrote that Hobbs combined classical play with effective defence—including protecting the wickets using his pads—against the ball unexpectedly moving towards the stumps. His pad-play was controversial: it removed any possibility of dismissal but was regarded by some cricket authorities as negative and unsporting.

Many of his English contemporaries rated Hobbs superior to Donald Bradman, often regarded as the greatest batsman in the history of cricket, on difficult pitches. In difficult batting conditions Hobbs batted with great success, and several of his most highly regarded innings came in such circumstances. Murphy suggests: "Before Bradman, he was the most consistent run-getter of all time, yet no one worried less about the sheer slog of carving out big scores." Hobbs frequently was out deliberately soon after reaching a century—roughly a quarter of his centuries were scores less than 110—and was not particularly interested in most statistics. An article in Wisden in 2000 stated: "He was never as dominant as Bradman; he never wanted to be. But his contemporaries were in awe of his ability to play supremely and at whim, whatever the conditions."

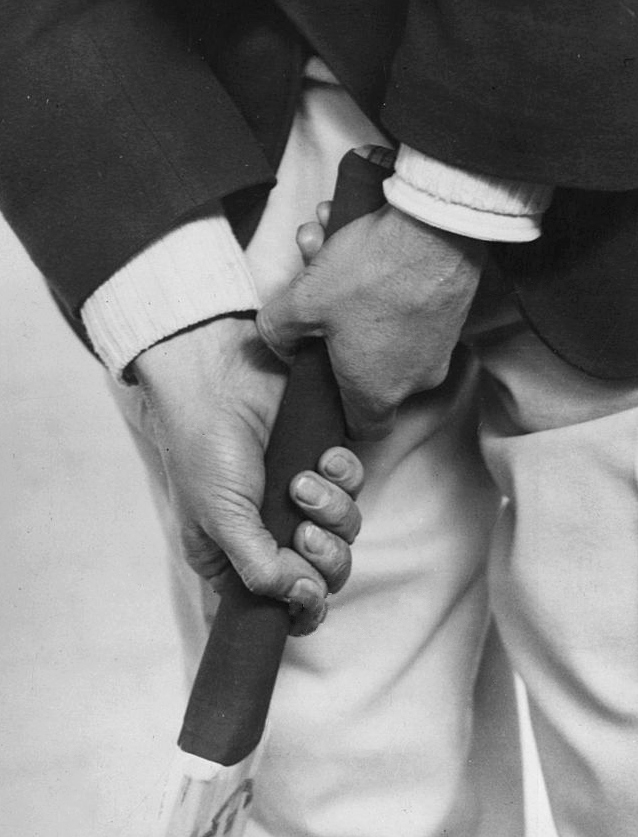
Hobbs grip

Hobbs's technique was based on strong forearms and good foot movement. R. C. Robertson-Glasgow suggested that "his footwork was, as near as is humanly possible, perfect. In every stroke, he moved into line with the ball with so little effort that he could bat for hours without over-taxing energy of mind or body." He played every type of shot—he did not have a "signature" shot like other batsmen, but selected his strokes effectively; according to Alec Kennedy, who bowled to Hobbs, it seemed that he could predict what the bowler would do. In contrast to many leading batsmen from his time, Hobbs preferred to play off the back foot as he believed it gave him more time to see the ball and adapt his shot. Capable of playing all the strokes, he hit the ball precisely between fielders and sometimes delayed his shot to make the ball travel more slowly and allow more time to run; he also ran well between the wickets. He liked to score his first run quickly when he came into bat, and he often looked to score quickly at the start of an innings, before the bowlers had settled; on occasion, Hobbs targeted the main bowling threats from the opposition in an attempt to neutralise them. Early in his career, mainly before the First World War, Hobbs was an aggressive, fast-scoring batsman who played many shots. After the war, he was more circumspect and adapted his technique to account for both his increased age, and the increased pressure and expectation from the public and teammates. He concentrated to a greater extent on batting for longer periods; many critics, including Hobbs himself, recognised the change and suggested that he was a better batsman before 1914. However, commentators also noted that he displayed greater certainty and control in this later period; Cardus wrote that "he scored his centuries effortlessly now; we hardly noted the making of them." This was the period in which he became known as "The Master", and he was more consistent than before the war. This was the time when the public regarded him with the most respect and affection; 98 of his centuries and 26,411 of his runs (at an average of 58.62) in first-class cricket were scored after he reached the age of 40.

Hobbs was an occasional medium-paced bowler who bowled a good length and made the ball swing. Some critics judged him to be a potentially good bowler, but both Surrey and England were reluctant for him to bowl regularly, fearing it would affect his batting. As a fielder, Hobbs improved greatly from his early days. He fielded in the covers and was expert in cutting off potential runs and returning the ball quickly to the wicket-keeper. Contemporaries believed him to be one of the best cover fielders there had been, and remarked on his powers of anticipation in getting to the ball. They also noted he sometimes deceived batsmen with his casual attitude and occasional deliberate mis-fields; these would be followed by very sharp fielding which often produced a run out.

Although a professional—captains at the time were almost exclusively amateurs—the respect in which Hobbs was held meant that he was accepted as a captain. Many, but not all, critics considered him a competent tactician and leader. He regularly led the Players team against the Gentlemen and sometimes at Surrey in the absence of Percy Fender, but he was a reluctant captain. He disliked the responsibility and decision-making of leadership, and rarely even offered tactical advice.

== Reputation and legacy ==
Hobbs was twice selected as Wisden's Cricketer of the Year, in 1909 and 1926; only he and Pelham Warner have received this award twice. In 1963, Neville Cardus chose him as one of the best six cricketers of the previous 100 years, to mark Wisden's centenary. More recently, Hobbs was selected by a panel of experts in 2000 as one of five Wisden cricketers of the 20th century. In 2009, he was selected by cricket historians and writers as a member of England's all-time best team, and included in a similar team to represent the best players worldwide in the history of cricket. Hobbs's Test batting average of 56.94 remained as of 2016 the sixth best among batsmen to have passed 5,000 runs, despite a rise in the number of batsmen who average more than 50 since 2000. Among openers who have scored 5,000 Test runs, he has the third best average behind Sutcliffe and Len Hutton. He was comfortably the leading Test run-scorer during his career, and had the highest number of Test runs at the time of his retirement. Between 1910 and 1929, he averaged 65.55 in Test cricket.

Gideon Haigh suggests that Hobbs was a "spontaneous and original", trend-setting batsman who was not afraid to depart from orthodoxy. Gerald Howat notes that, aside from his batting achievements, "Hobbs's biographers and obituarists could strike no discordant note. He was a man of moral probity, religious conviction, and personal commitment. And he was humble enough to see himself as an ordinary person blessed with one extraordinary talent, which he put into its proper perspective. It was an attitude of mind which tempered the sternness of his approach with an engaging humour and a delight in playing practical jokes." Among his contemporaries, Hobbs was regarded as modest and kind, and never criticised other players. He avoided confrontation, although he was "quietly determined", according to Wisden, and tried to avoid publicity. According to Fender, Hobbs "gave stature" to the profession of cricket. Modern critics have expressed some reservations: some have pointed out that his batting average, although high, has been surpassed by others, and that among his many centuries, few were as large as other players managed. However, others contend that his impact on the game, his achievement in showing that professionals could bat as freely and stylishly as amateurs, and his kindness place him among the top cricketers of all time. Wisden described him in 2000: "More than anyone else, he lifted the status and dignity of the English professional cricketer." In summing up his place in history, it said: "He was not an artist, like some of his predecessors, nor yet a scientist, like some of the moderns; he was perhaps the supreme craftsman."

== Personal life ==
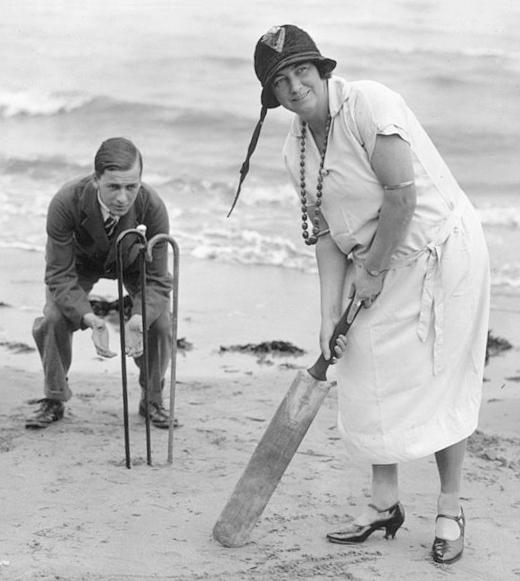
Hobbs's wife and son in 1925

=== Family life ===
In 1900, Hobbs met Ada Ellen Gates, a cobbler's daughter, at an evening church service held in St Matthew's, Cambridge. The progress of their relationship was slowed by Hobbs's shyness and devotion to cricket, but the pair eventually married on 26 September 1906 at the church in which they met. They planned to keep the event quiet, but it was reported in the press and the couple received gifts and messages from Hobbs's team-mates at Surrey. Hobbs so disliked being separated from his wife during cricket tours that in later years she often accompanied the team overseas. They had four children: Jack, born in 1907, Leonard in 1909, Vera in 1913 and Ivor in 1914.

Hobbs and his wife lived in rented property for the first years of their marriage. His earnings placed them roughly in the bracket of lower middle class according to McKinstry: although more prosperous than he had been during his childhood, the family were not initially financially comfortable. Hobbs's wages increased with his reputation so that by 1913, he was earning £375 (£46,040 in 2021 terms) each year, placing his family within the bracket of the London middle class. After several years of moving from one property to another, he was able to buy his own house in 1913, in Clapham Common, a prosperous area of London. By the middle of the 1920s, cricket in England was extremely popular and the players were famous. Hobbs was the biggest attraction to the sport, and a combination of his cricket earnings (estimated to be around £780 [£50,457 in 2021 terms] each year), the income from his business, product endorsement—he was one of the first cricketers to benefit from lending his name to commercial products—and ghostwritten books and articles made him relatively wealthy. According to McKinstry, his annual earnings probably reached £1,500 (£97,032 in 2021 terms) a year by 1925, more than a family doctor at the time. Consequently, in 1928, the family moved to a large house in private grounds, and Hobbs was able to send his children to private schools. He had greater financial independence than most contemporary cricketers, but he was always first concerned to give his family the security lacking from his childhood.

=== Health ===
Hobbs was teetotal.

=== Retirement and final years ===
Following his retirement from cricket in 1934, Hobbs continued to work as a journalist, first with Jack Ingham then with Jimmy Bolton as his ghostwriters. He accompanied the MCC team to Australia in 1936–37 and published four books which sold well in the 1930s. In addition, he produced two ghostwritten autobiographies, but generally avoided self-publicity or controversy. He continued to work at his sports shop and he and Ada moved home several times. By the mid-1930s, his wife was becoming mentally and physically frail. Hobbs supported several charities in his spare time and continued to play cricket at club and charity level.

During the Second World War, Hobbs served in the Home Guard at New Malden. In 1946, he became the first professional to be elected to the Surrey committee. The same year, he and his wife moved to Hove, following several years of health concerns and worries over his business and children. Ada's health continued to deteriorate, and the couple spent some time in South Africa in an attempt to aid her recuperation.

Hobbs was knighted for services to cricket in the 1953 Coronation Honours, the first professional cricketer to be so honoured; he was reluctant to accept it and only did so when convinced that it was an honour to all professional cricketers, not just himself. In the same year, John Arlott formed the "Master's Club", a group of Hobbs's admirers who met regularly to celebrate him. Hobbs remained active into the 1960s, including working in his shop. By the late 1950s, Ada required the use of a wheelchair, and Hobbs spent most of his time caring for her. She died in March 1963. Hobbs's own health began to fail shortly afterwards, and he died on 21 December 1963 at the age of 81. He left £19,445 (£433,263 in 2021 terms) in his will and was buried in Hove Cemetery. A memorial service was held at Southwark Cathedral in February 1964.

== Bibliography ==
- Arlott, John (1981). Jack Hobbs: Profile of "The Master". London: John Murray/David-Poynter. ISBN 0-7195-3886-6.
- Green, Benny, ed. (1982). Wisden Anthology 1900–1940. London: Queen Anne Press. ISBN 0-7472-0706-2.
- Mason, Ronald (1960). Jack Hobbs: A Portrait of an Artist as a Great Batsman. London: Hollis & Carter. OCLC 752987944.
- Marshall, Michael (1987). Gentlemen and Players: Conversations with Cricketers. London: Grafton Books. ISBN 0-246-11874-1.
- McKinstry, Leo (2011). Jack Hobbs: England's Greatest Cricketer. London: Yellow Jersey Press. ISBN 978-0-224-08329-4.
- Murphy, Patrick (2009). The Centurions: From Grace to Ramprakash. Bath: Fairfield Books. ISBN 978-0-9560702-4-1.
- Robertson-Glasgow, R. C. (1943). Cricket Prints: Some Batsmen and Bowlers, 1920–1940. London: T. Werner Laurie. OCLC 3257334.
- Swanton, E. W. (1999). Cricketers of My Time. London: Andre Deutsch. ISBN 0-233-99746-6.
