= Innings =

Period of activity in a cricket match

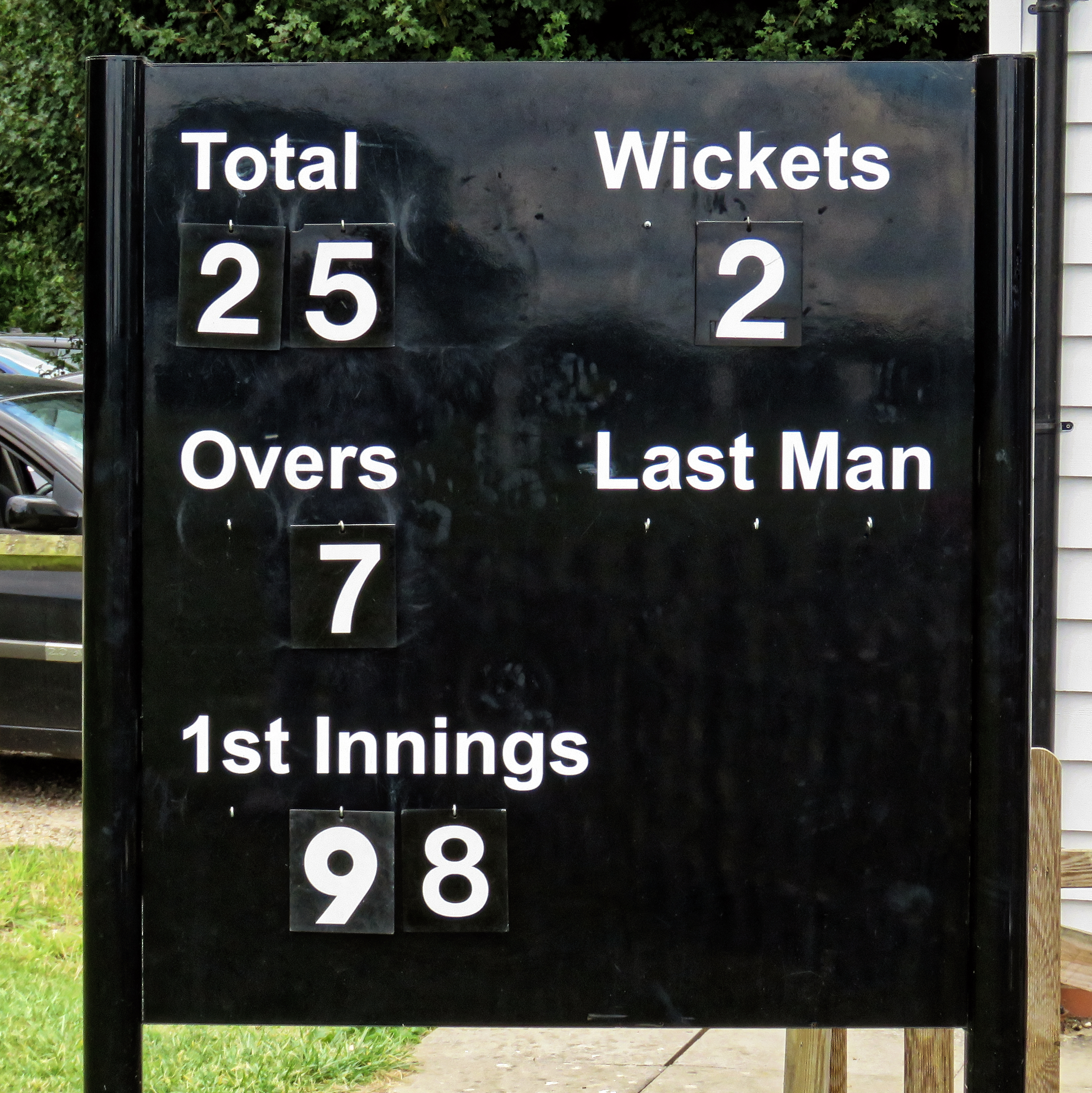

An innings is one of the divisions of a cricket match during which one team takes its turn to bat. Innings also means the period in which an individual player bats (acts as either striker or nonstriker). In cricket and rounders, "innings" is both singular and plural; this contrasts with baseball and softball in which the singular is "inning".

== Origin ==
The earliest known record of the term concerns a match in August 1730 at Blackheath between Kent and London. The London-based St. James Evening Post reported: "'Twas thought that the Kentish champions would have lost their honours by being beaten at one innings if time had permitted".

== Usage in cricket ==
An innings is one of the divisions of a match during which one team takes its turn to bat, and is said to be "in to bat". Innings is the subject of Law 13 in the Laws of Cricket.

- In a first-class match, there are up to four innings, with each team due to bat twice (in practice, this is not always the case). In a limited overs match, there are only two innings, with each team batting once (though there can be extra, shortened innings in the case of a tie).
- An innings may end in a number of ways, such as when all but one batsman on the team is gotten out, or in limited overs cricket, when the limited number of overs for that innings have been bowled.
- In a double innings match, if one team scores more runs in one innings than their opponents can score in two completed innings, the winning team is said to have won the match by an innings and the number of runs they are ahead. They have thus achieved an innings victory and their opponents have suffered an innings defeat.

The term is also used with the meaning of "score" for both the team and each individual batsman. For example, it may be said that "he played an innings of 101", meaning that the player scored 101 runs in his innings (while batting during one of the team's innings). Similarly, it may be said that the team had a first innings (score) of 501.

== See also ==
- Cricket terminology

== Bibliography ==
- Buckley, G. B. (1935). Fresh Light on 18th Century Cricket. Cotterell.
- Chambers (2006). The Chambers Dictionary, 10th Edition. Edinburgh: Chambers Harrap. ISBN 0-550-10185-3.
- Maun, Ian (2009). From Commons to Lord's, Volume One: 1700 to 1750. Roger Heavens. ISBN 978-1-900592-52-9.
- Oxford (2004). Oxford English Dictionary, 11th Edition. Oxford: Oxford University Press. ISBN 0-19-860864-0.
