= Ronald Mason (cricket writer) =

English writer (1912 – 2001)

Ronald Charles Mason (1912 – 5 August 2001) was an English writer of novels, biographies, literary criticism and cricket books.

== Life and career ==
After attending King's College School, Wimbledon, Mason entered the civil service, working most of his life in the estate duty office, employed in the collection of death duties. He also had a career as a writer, beginning as a novelist of modest success before devoting his energies to cricket books. After the Second World War he completed a first-class honours degree in English from the University of London, studying externally.

Mason had trouble getting his first cricket book, Batsman's Paradise: An Anatomy of Cricketomania, published, until he sent it to Errol Holmes, the former Surrey captain, who recommended it to a publisher. In Mason's obituary notice, Wisden said his cricket books were "marked by a genuine affection for the subject as well as a flowing style". It also praised the balance of Ashes in the Mouth, his account of the Bodyline series of 1932-33.

Mason and his wife Peggie had two sons (one of whom, Nick, was a journalist for The Guardian) and a daughter.

== Prose style ==
Mason was a master of the long sentence. Here, in Batsman's Paradise, he describes in two sentences a rare appearance in higher company for the Surrey stalwart Tom Shepherd, in a Test trial at Lord's in 1927:

That he proceeded to engage with Leyland in a stand of over 200, driving beautifully and seeming never for a moment at a loss with the wiliest bowlers in the kingdom, never surprised me for a moment; that his innings of 90 or so was very correctly singled out as one of the gems of the match was entirely right and proper and to be expected. That the selectors would never do anything about it, or that he would never get his chance to appear in any other representative matches of any kind, was almost as inevitable a corollary; and Tom Shepherd from that time forth obediently and I do not doubt quite contentedly continued to bat and bowl at the Oval, where he was known and honoured and knew his way about.

== Books ==
=== Novels ===
- Timbermills (1939)
- The Gold Garland (1939)
- The House of the Living (1946)
- Cold Pastoral (1946)

=== Non-fiction ===
- The Spirit above the Dust: A Study of Herman Melville (1951)
- Batsman's Paradise: An Anatomy of Cricketomania (1955)
- Jack Hobbs: A Portrait of an Artist as a Great Batsman (1960)
- Walter Hammond: A Biography (1962)
- Sing All a Green Willow (1967)
- "Plum" Warner's Last Season (1970)
- Warwick Armstrong's Australians (1971)
- Ashes in the Mouth: The Story of the Bodyline Tour of 1932-33 (1982)
