= St Matthew's Primary School =

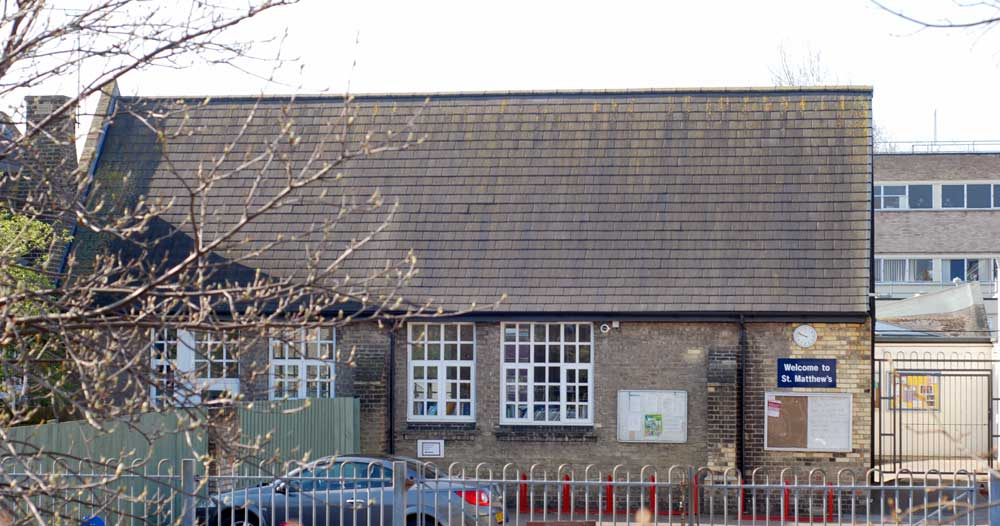

Location
- 19 Norfolk Street; Cambridge, Cambridgeshire, CB1 2LD; England; 52°12′16″N 0°08′05″E

Information
- Type: Community primary school
- Established: 1836 / 1963
- Local authority: Cambridgeshire
- Department for Education URN: 110750 Tables
- Ofsted: Reports
- Head teacher: Anthony Davies
- Gender: Mixed
- Age range: 3–11
- Enrolment: 670 (2018)
- Capacity: 660
- Website: www.stmatthews.cambs.sch.uk

St Matthew's Primary School is a 3–11 mixed community primary school in Cambridge, Cambridgeshire, England. It is non-denominational, and catering for 615 pupils with an affiliated after-school kids’ club. The school was established in 1963, though there have been various schools on the site since 1836. It is a feeder school for Parkside Community College.

== History ==
The first schools on the St Matthew's site were the Barnwell National schools for boys, girls, and infants, opened by the Old Schools in 1836. At the time the site was on the eastern edge of a rapidly expanding Cambridge. The infants’ school was on East Road, the boys’ and girls’ schools accessed through Schoolhouse Lane (off East Road).

National schools were founded by the National Society (founded in 1811), which had the aim of founding a Church school in every parish in England and Wales. The Old Schools was a trust founded in 1704 which at the time managed most of the schools in Cambridge. Previously these were dame schools, but from the early 19th century the trust adopted a policy of supporting Church of England schools.

From the 1870s, the newly established St Matthew's parish had a complex history of different schools’ sites and movement of pupils between them. There were four schools opened: Norfolk Street infants in 1875, York Street boys in 1878, Norfolk Street girls and Sturton Street infants in 1883.

The Barnwell schools were enlarged and rebuilt towards the end of the nineteenth century. In 1900 (at which time the school leaving age was 12) there was an average attendance of around 700 boys, girls & infants at Barnwell National, and 680 at the St Matthew's schools in Norfolk Street, York Street, and Sturton Street. Barnwell boys’ school was occupied by the army in the First World War but restored to use afterwards.

In 1931 the Barnwell boys’ and girls’ schools were reconstituted as St George's Senior School. The pupils at the infants school were transferred to St Matthew's School, and the seniors at St Matthew's Norfolk Street and York Street schools were transferred to St George's (the juniors remaining). In 1933, the Norfolk Street girls’ and York Street boys’ were amalgamated. Under the Education Act 1944 St George's became East Road secondary modern school.

In 1963, East Road school was closed, being replaced by the current St Matthew's primary school, with the infants and juniors being transferred from the Norfolk Street and York Street schools, leaving St Matthew's the only school remaining in the Barnwell area (the Norfolk Street schools survive today as a private house).

The site has now been extensively redeveloped, with much of the surrounding terraced housing being demolished (along Norfolk Street, Caroline Place, and Broad Street), and Schoolhouse Lane being incorporated into the school site. The main entrance is now from Norfolk Street (Caroline Place), with other entrances off Broad Street and Flower Street.

2012–13 saw the school extended from two-form intake to three-form intake, with the addition of a new 12-classroom 3-storey building facing East Road. During construction, a number of skeletal remains were discovered, and subsequently excavated by Oxford Archaeology East, from what had been the cemetery of a Baptist chapel.
