= Ted Brooks =

English cricketer (1898–1960)

Personal information
- Full name: Edward William John Brooks
- Born: 8 July 1898; Camberwell, Surrey, England
- Died: 10 February 1960 (aged 61); Rustington, Sussex, England
- Batting: Right-handed
- Bowling: Right-arm medium
- Role: Wicket-keeper

Domestic team information
- Years: Team
- 1925–1939: Surrey

Career statistics
Competition	First-class
Matches	359
Runs scored	4,497
Batting average	13.07
100s/50s	0/9
Top score	70
Balls bowled	6
Wickets	0
Bowling average	–
5 wickets in innings	0
10 wickets in match	0
Best bowling	–
Catches/stumpings	727/97
- Source: CricketArchive

Edward William John Brooks (8 July 1898 – 10 February 1960) was an English cricketer. A wicket-keeper, he played first-class cricket for Surrey from 1925 to 1939, all but five of his first-class appearances being for the county. Only Bert Strudwick has exceeded his 810 dismissals for the county.

He originally joined the Surrey staff as a medium-paced bowler. In a minor match in 1923 he kept wicket when the regular wicketkeeper was injured, and did so well that he concentrated on his keeping from then on. When Strudwick retired after the 1927 season, Brooks succeeded him as the regular first team keeper, having already played in some matches from 1925 to 1927 when Strudwick was injured or away playing for England. He was notably acrobatic behind the stumps and kept particularly well to fast bowling. That he was regarded highly as a keeper is indicated by the fact that he played four times for the Players against the Gentlemen between 1931 and 1935. He took six catches in an innings against Kent at Blackheath in 1935, which equalled the Surrey record.

Though no better than a useful tail-end batsman, when he made his highest score of 70, against Hampshire at the Oval in 1936, he shared a stand of 168 for the ninth wicket with Errol Holmes in just 75 minutes. This remains the Surrey record partnership for that wicket.

He was noted as a humorist, both on and off the field. In one match he missed two stumpings off Freddie Brown in one over and another in Brown's next over, all from the same batsman. In the following over he held a fine diving catch off Alf Gover to dismiss the batsman. Brooks walked up to Brown and said: "I can catch 'em if I can't stump 'em."
