= Arthur McIntyre (cricketer, born 1918) =

English cricketer (1918–2009)

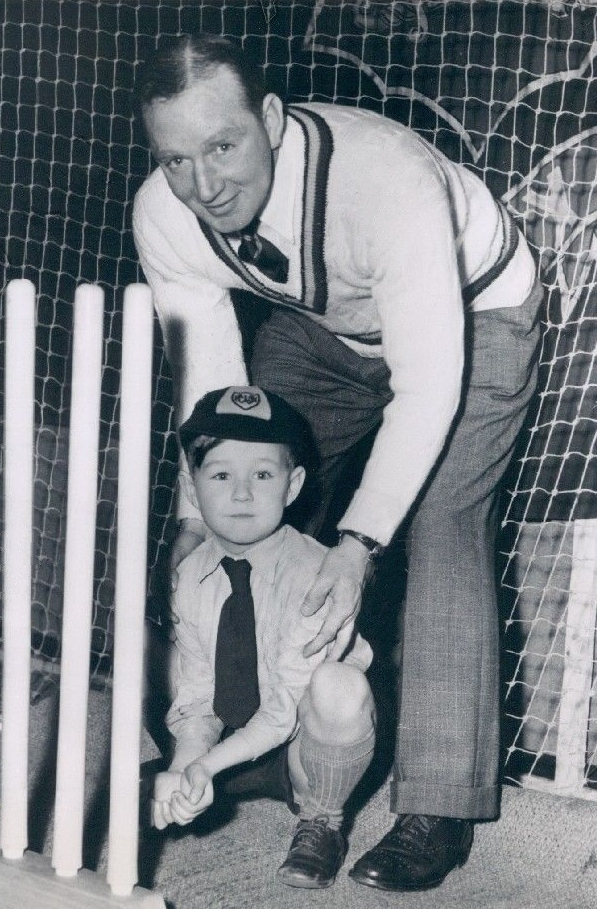
- McIntyre teaching cricket to a boy in 1955

Personal information
- Full name: Arthur John William McIntyre
- Born: 14 May 1918; Kennington, London, England
- Died: 26 December 2009 (aged 91); Hordle, Hampshire, England
- Batting: Right-handed
- Bowling: Right-arm leg break
- Role: Wicket-keeper

International information
- National side: England
- Test debut (cap 352): 12 August 1950 v West Indies
- Last Test: 21 July 1955 v South Africa

Domestic team information
- Years: Team
- 1938–1963: Surrey
- 1950–1951: Marylebone Cricket Club

Career statistics
Competition	Test	FC
Matches	3	390
Runs scored	19	11,145
Batting average	3.16	22.83
100s/50s	0/0	7/51
Top score	7	143*
Balls bowled	–	287
Wickets	–	4
Bowling average	–	45.00
5 wickets in innings	–	0
10 wickets in match	–	0
Best bowling	–	1/10
Catches/stumpings	8/–	637/158
- Source: CricketArchive, 14 August 2010

Arthur John William McIntyre (14 May 1918 – 26 December 2009) was an English cricketer. A wicket-keeper, he was an integral part of the Surrey side that won the County Championship in every season from 1952 to 1958 inclusive, and played in three Tests for the English cricket team, two in 1950 and one in 1955. According to McIntyre's obituary in The Daily Telegraph, Peter May wrote: "Godfrey Evans could touch great heights of wicketkeeping but day in, day out, Arthur was the most reliable wicketkeeper of the 1950s... He should have kept many times for England."

== Life and career ==
McIntyre was born in Kennington in London, within a quarter of a mile of The Oval. He was educated at Kennington Road School, and played cricket as wicket-keeper for London Schools alongside Denis Compton. After a short period outside cricket after leaving school, he joined the ground staff at the Oval in 1936, and made his debut in first-class cricket for Surrey in 1938, originally as all-rounder batsman and leg-spinner.

In World War II, McIntyre served in the British Army in North Africa, and was wounded in the Anzio landings, ending as a sergeant in the APTC. He became friends with the Bedser twins near the end of the war when all three served in Italy. After the war, he successfully filled in for Surrey as an emergency wicket-keeper, and took over the position permanently from Gerald Mobey when he retired in 1946. In addition to his excellent wicket-keeping, he was a strong first-class batsman, and passed 1,000 runs on three occasions, scoring seven centuries. He was kept out of the England cricket team by Godfrey Evans. He made his Test debut alongside David Sheppard and Malcolm Hilton in the fourth Test against the West Indies at The Oval in 1950, when Evans was incapacitated with a broken thumb. He toured Australia and New Zealand with the MCC that winter, and played in the first Test of the 1950–51 Ashes series as a batsman, with Evans keeping wicket. He played his third and last Test in the fourth Test against South Africa at Headingley in 1955, his benefit season, when Evans was again injured. Evans was still not available for the fifth Test, but McIntyre was also not able to play. He was one of the Wisden Cricketers of the Year in 1958.

In his autobiography, Peter May wrote that McIntyre should have played many times for England (he played in only three Tests and in one of those not as wicket-keeper). May commented on McIntyre's reliability and how he kept superbly to the great Surrey bowling attack of Alec Bedser, Peter Loader, Jim Laker and Tony Lock on difficult wickets. McIntyre, said May, made it look easy and was "never acrobatic" (unlike Evans). McIntyre himself said he had the greatest difficulty keeping wicket to Laker, who "spun the ball so viciously".

McIntyre retired from regular first-class cricket after the 1958 season and became Surrey's coach, a position he held until the end of the 1976 season. He made a few first-class appearances while coach when the usual wicket-keeper was injured or unavailable: six in 1959, two in 1960 and two in 1963. Following the death of Ken Cranston on 9 January 2007, he became England's oldest living former Test cricketer. He died on Boxing Day, 2009.
