= David Ward (Surrey cricketer) =

English cricketer (born 1961)

Personal information
- Full name: David Mark Ward
- Born: 10 February 1961 (age 65); Croydon, Surrey, England
- Nickname: Gnasher
- Batting: Right-handed
- Bowling: Right-arm off-break
- Role: Batter, occasional wicketkeeper

Domestic team information
- Years: Team
- 1984–2002: Surrey
- 1997–2008: Hertfordshire

Career statistics
Competition	First-class	List A
Matches	156	240
Runs scored	8,139	5,439
Batting average	38.39	30.38
100s/50s	16/33	5/33
Top score	294*	114
Balls bowled	107	6
Wickets	2	–
Bowling average	56.50	–
5 wickets in innings	–	–
10 wickets in match	–	–
Best bowling	2/66	0/6
Catches/stumpings	122/3	102/3
- Source: CricketArchive, 16 November 2024

David Mark Ward (born 10 February 1961 at Croydon, Surrey) is a former aggressive batsman and occasional wicket-keeper for Surrey County Cricket Club, playing from 1985 until 2004. In all first-class matches, he scored 8139 runs at an average of 38.39, with 16 centuries and a highest score of 294 not out. He scored "a remarkable 2,072 first-class runs in 1990, including seven hundreds".

Nicknamed "Gnasher" for his prominent teeth, Ward was something of a cult personality as a player. He is now a coach at Whitgift School in South Croydon, where his pupils have included England opening batsmen Rory Burns, Jason Roy and Dom Sibley, wicket-keeper Jamie Smith, and several other players for Surrey, such as Freddie van den Bergh and Laurie Evans.

Within the conservative and restrictive world of cricket whites, Ward was able to demonstrate a little eccentricity, occasionally choosing to wear a cap or even helmet decorated in the traditional Harlequin pattern more associated with Douglas Jardine and other players of yester-year.

Ward currently plays club cricket for Old Whitgiftians C.C. in the Surrey Championship when his school duties allow.
