= Arnold Long =

English cricketer (1940–2026)

Personal information
- Born: 18 December 1940; Cheam, Surrey, England
- Died: 1 January 2026 (aged 85)
- Batting: Left-handed
- Role: Wicket-keeper

Domestic team information
- Years: Team
- 1976–1980: Sussex
- 1963–1973: Marylebone Cricket Club
- 1960–1975: Surrey

Career statistics
Competition	First-class	List A
Matches	452	232
Runs scored	6,801	1,502
Batting average	16.75	12.83
100s/50s	–/13	–/1
Top score	92	71
Balls bowled	6	–
Wickets	–	–
Bowling average	–	–
5 wickets in innings	–	–
10 wickets in match	–	–
Best bowling	–	–
Catches/stumpings	923/124	213/34
- Source: Cricinfo, 20 July 2012

Arnold Long (18 December 1940 – 1 January 2026) was an English first-class cricketer. He played for Surrey between 1960 and 1975, then spent the remainder of his career at Sussex, whom he captained between 1978 and 1980, during which time they won the 1978 Gillette Cup. A wicket-keeper and left-handed batsman, Long claimed 1046 victims from his 452 games over a 20-year career. Of these, 805 were for Surrey between 1960 and 1975, putting him third in the county's all-time wicketkeeping records. In 1962 he took 74 catches, and made 91 dismissals in all, both of which are Surrey records for one season. He was a member of the Surrey side that won the County Championship in 1971.

Long was a Trustee of the Hornsby Professional Cricketers' Fund charity. He died from cancer on 1 January 2026, at the age of 85.

== Sources ==
- Arnold Long at Cricinfo

Sporting positions
Preceded by Tony Greig	Sussex county cricket captain 1978–1980	Succeeded by John Barclay
