= End of an innings =

Concept in the sport of cricket

In cricket, a team's innings ends in one of the following ways. In cases 1 and 2, the team are said to be all out, because they do not have two players available to bat.

1. All but one of the batsmen are out.
2. The batting side only has one not-out batsman who is still able to bat (the others are incapacitated through injury, illness or absence; see retirement).
3. The team batting last scores the required number of runs to win.
4. The game runs out of time for either side to win, and so finishes as a draw.
5. The set number of overs (sets of 6 deliveries) have been bowled (in limited overs cricket).
6. The team's captain declares the innings closed.
7. The Match Referee decides that one team has forfeited the game.

Law 13 covers the end of the innings.

== Taking wickets ==
When the bowling team has dismissed all but one of the batsmen the innings is said to be over. The batting team is said to be 'all out' or 'bowled out'.

For example, in most games, each side has 11 players, so 10 wickets need to be taken to bowl a side out.

There is an exception to this rule if one or more batsmen are injured and/or ill and cannot bat. In such cases, when only one batsman remains not out and capable of batting, the innings is over.

In the case of a Super Over innings, only two batsmen must be dismissed for the innings to be over.

== Overs bowled ==
In some games, each team is allocated a set number of overs and its innings is closed once they have been bowled (subject to the innings not ending by another method beforehand).

A restriction can be imposed in a one-innings game, or in the first innings of a two innings game.

Where such a restriction is imposed in a one-innings game, it is said to be a limited overs match. An example of this is an ODI match, where each team can bat for only 50 consecutive overs. Once the 50 overs are up, and the team has not been bowled out, the innings is closed. If rain intervenes so that all the allocated overs cannot be bowled in the time available for the game, the overs restriction may be modified so that the game may be completed in the time that remains.

== Declaration ==
If the captain of the batting team feels that his team has amassed a sufficiently large score, he, or the batsmen at the crease deputising for him, may end his team's innings voluntarily by declaring. This option does not apply to limited overs matches. Declarations allow the declaring side to use all the remaining time to attempt to gain the wickets necessary for victory. The strategic consideration is to gamble a certain draw for a possible victory, while risking defeat if the target is achieved by the incoming batting side.

== Achieving the target ==
If one team has completed all of their scheduled innings, while the other team has not, then the initial team is said to have set a "target", which is the number of runs they have scored plus one, that the other team must "chase". If the chasing team manages to achieve the target, their innings is ended and they win. In rain-affected matches in which the Duckworth-Lewis method applies, the target to be reached may be less than the actual target set by the first batting side. In a two-innings match where the follow-on has been enforced, the initial batting team may have to chase the target set by the other team.

== Forfeiture ==
In the event of the match being disrupted by unruly fans of the host team, the Match Referee may cede the match to the visiting team, if they are in a vantage position.
