= Bert Strudwick =

English cricketer (1880–1970)

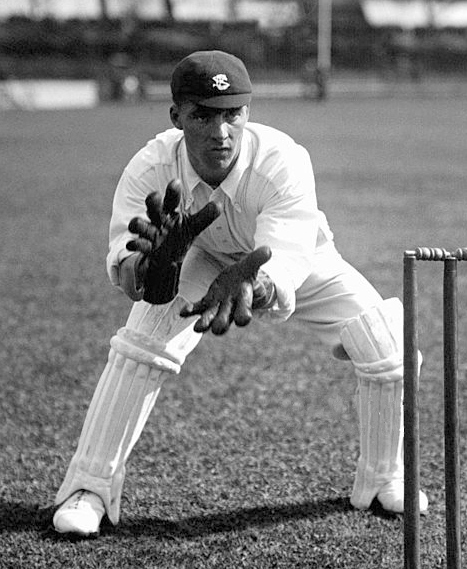

Personal information
- Full name: Herbert Strudwick
- Born: 28 January 1880; Mitcham, Surrey, England
- Died: 14 February 1970 (aged 90); Shoreham-by-Sea, Sussex, England
- Batting: Right-handed

International information
- National side: England
- Test debut: 1 January 1910 v South Africa
- Last Test: 18 August 1926 v Australia

Career statistics
Competition	Test	First-class
Matches	28	674
Runs scored	230	6,445
Batting average	7.93	10.88
100s/50s	0/0	0/9
Top score	24	93
Balls bowled	–	138
Wickets	–	1
Bowling average	–	102.00
5 wickets in innings	–	0
10 wickets in match	–	0
Best bowling	–	1/93
Catches/stumpings	61/12	1237/258
- Source: CricketArchive, 30 December 2021

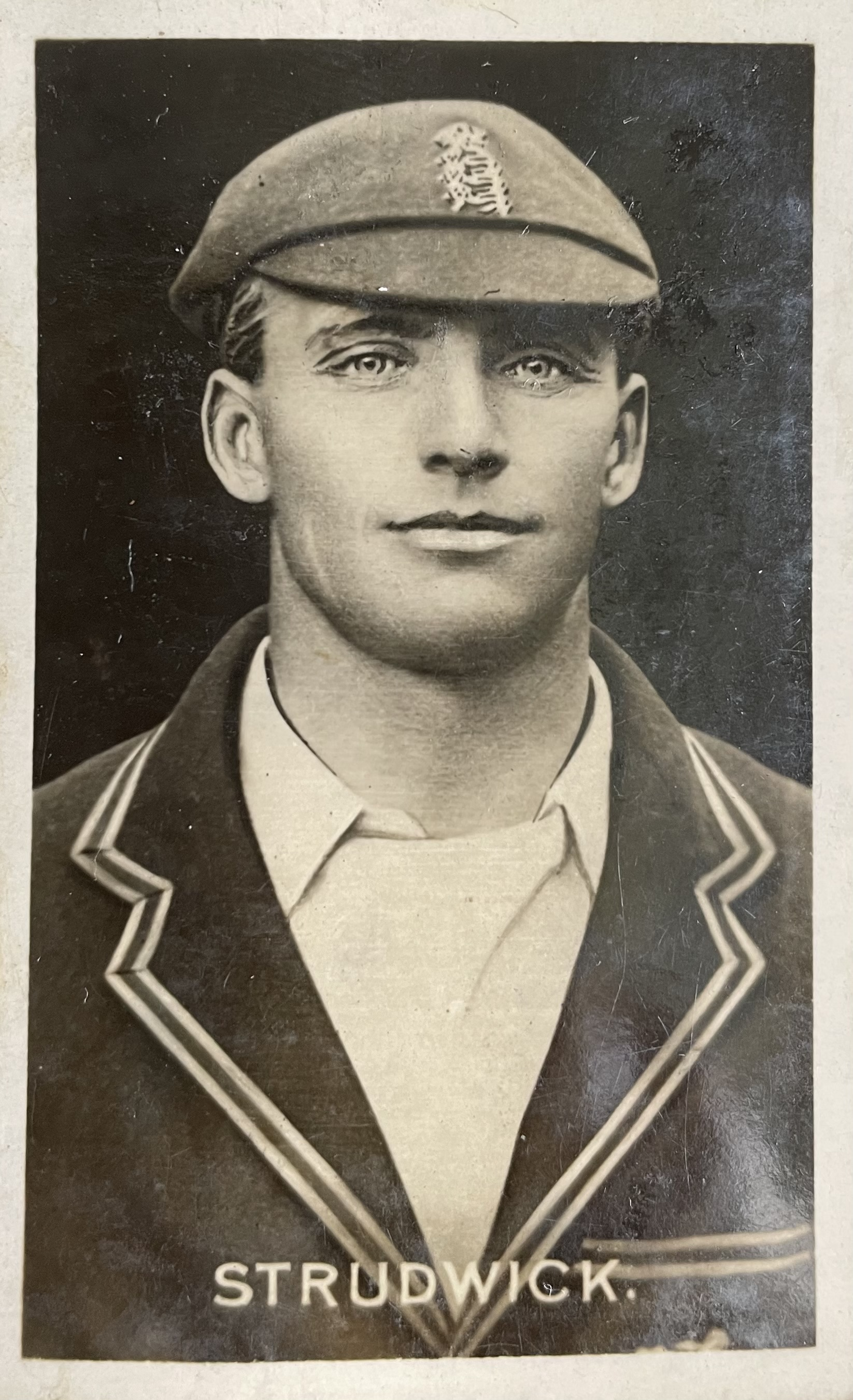
Bert Strudwick

Herbert Strudwick (28 January 1880 – 14 February 1970) was an English wicket-keeper. His record of 1,493 dismissals is the third-highest by any wicket-keeper in the history of first-class cricket.

== Biography ==
Born in Mitcham, Surrey, Strudwick took to wicket-keeping, apparently on the advice of a local lady, at the age of ten. He first played for Surrey in a few games in 1902, but during his first full season the following year dismissed a record 91 batsmen (71 catches and 20 stumpings) – a feat made more remarkable by the decline of Surrey's top fast bowlers Tom Richardson and William Lockwood and the exceptionally wet weather of that summer. From that time on, Strudwick became regarded as the natural successor to Dick Lilley as England's Test wicket-keeper, and he toured Australia in 1903/1904 without playing a Test.

Continuing his good form, Strudwick maintained his place among the top wicket-keepers right through the 1900s and played his first Test in 1909/1910 against South Africa. In 1911, though overshadowed in county cricket by Kent veteran Fred Huish, Strudwick was chosen as the first-choice wicket-keeper to Australia because of his relative youth and did not disappoint, taking the bowling of Frank Foster and Sydney Barnes with skill. His skill was seen to even greater effect taking Barnes on the matting wickets of South Africa in 1914: with Barnes' bowling bouncing and turning. In the following season, Strudwick's skill was an essential part of Surrey's success in winning the County Championship for the only time during his career.

After World War I halted county cricket, Strudwick re-established himself as an England player until he retired in 1927 – though he was dropped to improve the batting during the disastrous 1921 series against Armstrong's Australians. Gilbert Jessop said "Struddy was a specialist" and "year after year our most reliable 'stumper'", but in Test matches that wasn't enough. After his playing days he became a respected coach and for many years was the Surrey scorer.

In his later years Strudwick, renowned for his abstinence from tobacco and alcohol at a time when the health of sportsmen was not taken seriously, wrote many articles about the game in Wisden. The most famous of these is From Dr. Grace to Peter May in the 1959 Wisden, which outlines how Strudwick saw the game both during his career and as a spectator after retiring.

Not much of a batsman, he nonetheless twice added over 100 for the last wicket with Bill Hitch (one of only four pairs with more than one tenth-wicket century stand in first-class cricket). His record of 1,493 dismissals is the third-highest by any wicket-keeper in the history of first-class cricket.

== Death ==
He died in Shoreham-by-Sea, Sussex, aged 90.
