= Jonathan Batty =

English cricketer

Personal information
- Full name: Jonathan Neil Batty
- Born: 18 April 1974 (age 52); Chesterfield, Derbyshire, England
- Batting: Right-handed
- Role: Wicket-keeper

Domestic team information
- Years: Team
- 1994–2009: Surrey
- 2010–2012: Gloucestershire

Career statistics
Competition	FC	LA	T20
Matches	220	209	64
Runs scored	9,673	2,992	656
Batting average	31.50	21.83	21.86
100s/50s	20/41	1/14	0/2
Top score	168*	158*	59
Balls bowled	78	–	–
Wickets	1	–	–
Bowling average	61.00	–	–
5 wickets in innings	0	–	–
10 wickets in match	0	–	–
Best bowling	1/21	–	–
Catches/stumpings	605/68	220/40	38/21
- Source: Cricinfo, 17 September 2012

Jonathan Neil Batty (born 18 April 1974) is an English former first-class cricketer who played for Surrey and Gloucestershire. Batty was educated at Repton School, St Chad's College, Durham University and Keble College, Oxford.

On graduating from Durham University in 1995, Batty joined Hampshire. However, he was not retained. He continued his career on in minor county cricket before being offered contracts with Somerset and Surrey. He chose to become Surrey's third-choice wicket-keeper after Graham Kersey and Alec Stewart. Kersey, however, died from injuries in a car crash in Australia. With Stewart often unavailable to Surrey due to England duties, Batty was able to enjoy regular first team action, often opening the batting when Mark Butcher was also playing for England. Batty was a regular player in Surrey's sustained success, winning three county championships around the turn of the century.

Following Stewart's retirement from international cricket at the end of the 2003 season, Batty was surprisingly not mentioned in media discussions over Stewart's replacement – despite a county average of 57 that season. England's chairman of selectors, David Graveney said Batty's performances do not go unnoticed, but he remained in the international wilderness.

Batty captained Surrey in 2004. However, after a poor season, which saw champions Surrey relegated in the One Day Pro40 tournament, Batty was replaced as captain by Mark Butcher. However, Batty retained his place in the team and was awarded a benefit year by the county in 2009.

Batty equalled the world record for most catches in an innings with 8, against Kent at The Oval in 2004. Shortly afterwards he broke the record for most catches in a match with 11, against Lancashire, breaking the record of then Surrey coach Steve Rixon.

It was announced in October 2009 that Batty was leaving Surrey, having signed a three-year contract with Gloucestershire. He retired following the end of the 2012 season. In an article in the Daily Telegraph reviewing his career, Simon Briggs claimed that he was "the finest uncapped player of the last 20 years".

Batty was named as coach of Surrey's and Oval Invincibles' women's teams in March 2021. Under his coaching, Oval Invincibles won the inaugural season of The Women's Hundred in August 2021. Batty was also named as coach of Melbourne Stars in the Women's Big Bash League in May 2022.

== Career best performances ==
	Batting				Bowling (innings)			
	Score	Fixture	Venue	Season	Figures	Fixture	Venue	Season
First-class	168 not out	Surrey v Essex	Chelmsford	2003	1/21	Surrey v Lancashire	Manchester	2000
List A	158 not out	Surrey Lions v Hampshire Hawks	The Oval	2005	–			
T20	59	Surrey v Essex	The Oval	2006	–			
