= Comber (surname) =

Comber is a surname, and may refer to:

- Bobbie Comber (1886–1942), British comedian, singer and actor
- Casey Comber (born 1996), American middle-distance runner
- Charles Comber (1891–1966), Australian rules footballer
- George Comber (1856–1929), English undertaker and cricketer
- Harold Frederick Comber (1897–1969), English horticulturist and plant collector
- Jack Comber (1919–1992), Australian politician
- James Boughtwood Comber (1929–2005), Scottish plantation manager and botanist
- John Comber (1861–1903), English cricketer
- John William Comber (1906–1998), American Catholic missionary
- Joseph Comber (1911–1976), English cricketer
- Karen Le Comber (born 1969), New Zealand cricketer
- Ken Comber (1939–1998), New Zealand politician and accountant
- Leon Comber (1921–2023), British military and police officer and book publisher, in British India
- Lillian Comber, pen name Lillian Beckwith (1916–2004), English writer
- Michael Comber (born 1989), English cricketer
- Mick Comber (1903–1975), Australian rules footballer
- Robert Comber (c.1816–1858), English cricketer
- Thomas Comber (dean of Carlisle) (1575–1653), English cleric and linguist
- Thomas Comber (dean of Durham) (1645–1699), English churchman
- Thomas J. Comber (1852–1887), English Baptist missionary in the Congo region
- Tony Comber (1927–2022), Archdeacon of Leeds
