= List of orchidologists =

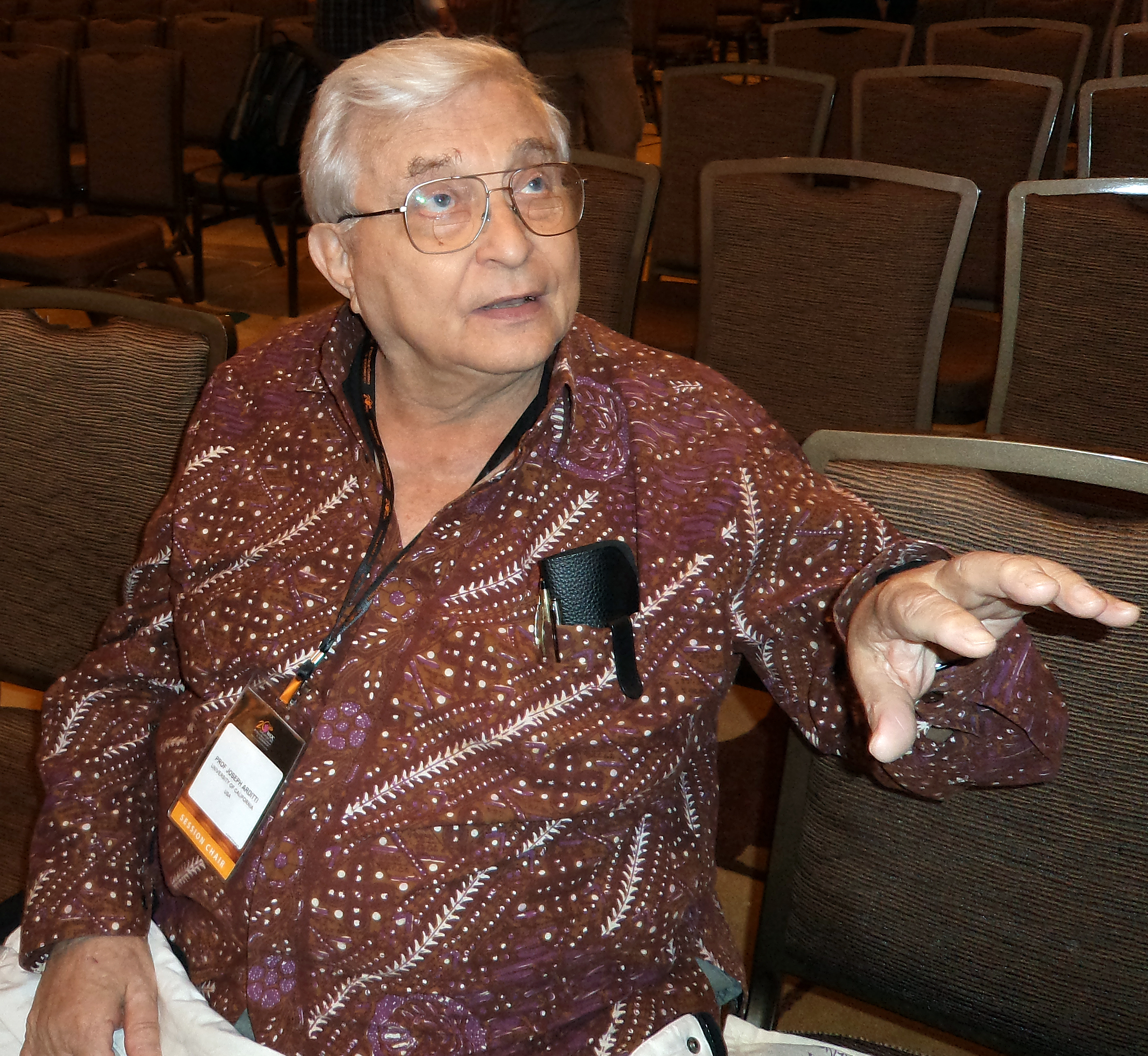
Professor Joseph Arditti, photograph by Sathish Kumar

Note that an entry is required "usually" or "in general," not always.

This list is far from complete.

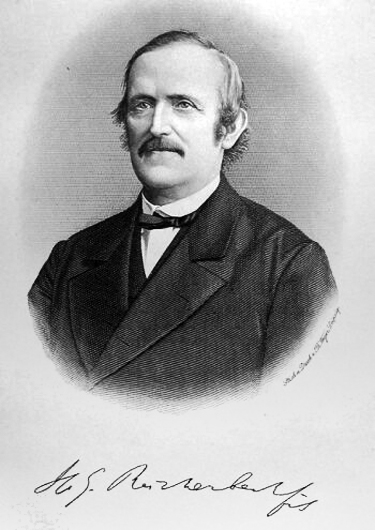
Heinrich Gustav Reichenbach, a german bontanist and orchidologist who was born in 1823 and died in 1889.

This is a list of orchidologists, botanists specializing in the study of orchids. The list is sorted in the surname alphabetical order.

== A ==
- Oakes Ames (botanist) (1874–1950), American biologist specializing in orchids
- Joseph Arditti (born 1932), American plant physiologist specializing in orchids. Doctorate from the University of Southern California, 1965. Professor of Biology University of California, Irvine, 1966-2001. Professor Emeritus, 2001-

== B ==
- Ray Barkalow (born 1952), US scientist and engineer, known for using science to explain or dispel orchid-growing myths.
- James Bateman (1811–1897), British landowner and accomplished horticulturist
- Carl Ludwig Blume (1796–1862), German-Dutch botanist
- Diego Bogarín (born 1982), Costa Rican biologist specialising in orchid phylogenetics, systematics and taxonomy of neotropical Orchidaceae

== C ==
- Cedric Errol Carr (1892–1936), New Zealand botanist, specialising in orchids
- Arthur Chadwick (born 1962), american orchid grower
- James Boughtwood Comber (1929–2005), British botanist
- Harold Frederick Comber (1897–1969), English horticulturist and plant collector
- Eugène Jacob de Cordemoy (1835–1911), French physician and botanist
- Benjamin J. Crain (born 1977), US biologist specializing in orchid ecology, biogeography, and conservation, primarily in the Caribbean, Pacific Islands, Latin America, and the United States.

== D ==
- Walter Davis (botanist)
- John Day (botanist) (1824–1888), English orchid-grower and collector, noted for producing some 4000 illustrations of orchid species
- Helga Dietrich (1940–2018), German botanist and orchidologist
- Margaret A. Dix (1939–2025), English-born Guatemalan biologist and taxonomist
- Donald Dungan Dod (1912–2008), American missionary and orchidologist
- Calaway H. Dodson (1928–2020), American botanist, orchidologist, and taxonomist
- Robert Louis Dressler (1927–2019), American botanist specialist of the taxonomy of the Orchidaceae

== E ==
- Rica Erickson (1908–2009), Australian naturalist, botanical artist, historian, author and teacher
- Ekrem Sezik, Turkish academician, pharmacist and author
- Choy sin Hew, Singapore plant physiologist specializing in orchids

== F ==
- Achille Eugène Finet (1863–1913), French botanist best known for his study of orchids native to Japan and China
- Ernesto Foldats (1925–2003), Latvian-Venezuelan botanist and orchidologist
- Noriaki Fukuyama (1912–1946), Japanese botanist and orchidologist

== G ==
- Leslie Andrew Garay (1924–2016), American botanist
- Samuel Goodenough (1743–1827), amateur botanist and collector
- Barbara Gravendeel (born 1968), Dutch evolutionary biologist, specialising in orchid phylogenetics, systematics and developmental studies

== H ==
- Karl Theodor Hartweg (1812–1871), German botanist
- Alex Drum Hawkes (1927–1977), American botanist and cookbook author from Coconut Grove, Florida and Kingston, Jamaica; specialized in orchids, bromeliads, palm trees, ferns, vegetables and fruits
- Abel Aken Hunter (1877–1936), American botanist in Panama

== K ==
- Adam P. Karremans (born 1986), Dutch-Costa Rican botanist specialised in phylogenetics and systematics of Neotropical Orchidaceae
- Carolus Adrianus Johannes Kreutz (born 1954), Dutch botanist and taxonomist, specialising in European orchids
- Pankaj Kumar (born 1975), Indian botanist, conservationist, ecologist and taxonomist, specialising in Asian orchids and now exploring orchids of the New World

== L ==
- Charles H. Lankester (1879–1969), British born, known for his orchid work in Costa Rica
- Carlos Adolfo Lehnebach (born 1974), Chilean born botanist. Moved to New Zealand in 2000. Research interests are pollination, taxonomy and conservation of New Zealand orchids. His collections are stored at the WELT herbarium (Museum of New Zealand Te Papa Tongarewa)
- Jean Jules Linden (1817–1898), Belgian botanist and explorer, horticulturist and businessman, specialising in orchids
- John Lindley
- Hugh Low

== M ==
- Hanna Margońska (born 1968), Polish botanist
- Theodore Luqueer Mead (1852–1936), American naturalist, entomologist and horticulturist known for his pioneering work on the growing and cross-breeding of orchids
- Brian John Peter Molloy (1930–2022), New Zealand botanist
- Henry Moon (1857–1905), English landscape and botanical painter, noted for his orchid paintings

== P ==
- Ernst Hugo Heinrich Pfitzer (1846–1906), German botanist specialist of the taxonomy of the Orchidaceae
- Charles Wesley Powell (1854–1927), American hobbyist and self-taught horticulturist specializing in the orchids of Panama
- George Harry Pring, British born orchid and water lily specialist known for his work at the Missouri Botanical Garden
- Franco Pupulin (born 1960), Italian botanist specialising in orchid taxonomy and systematics

== Q ==
- Eduardo Quisumbíng (1895–1986), Filipino plant biologist

== R ==
- Heinrich Gustav Reichenbach (1823–1889), botanist and the foremost German orchidologist of the 19th century
- Benedikt Roezl (1823–1885), Czech botanist, gardener, and explorer, among the most famous orchid collectors of his time
- Robert Allen Rolfe (1855–1921), British botanist and the first curator of the orchid herbarium at the Royal Botanic Gardens, Kew, England
- Santosh Kumar Reddy (born 1984), Indian Forest Service officer, among the most famous orchidologists in Arunachal Pradesh, India

== S ==
- Henry Frederick Conrad Sander
- Rudolf Schlechter (1872–1925), German taxonomist, botanist and author of several works on orchids
- Alexander Skutch
- Paul Carpenter Standley, American botanist, specializing in the flora of Central America, including orchids
- Olof Swartz (1760–1818), Swedish botanist and taxonomist, and the first specialist of orchid taxonomy
- Dariusz Szlachetko (born 1961), Polish botanist

== T ==
- Louis-Marie Aubert du Petit-Thouars (1758–1831), French botanist known for his work collecting and describing orchids from the three islands of Madagascar, Mauritius and Réunion

== V ==
- Louis van Houtte (1810–1876), Belgian horticulturist
- Ed de Vogel (born 1942), Dutch orchidologist, specialist of the orchid flora of Southeast Asia

== W ==
- Józef Warszewicz (1812–1866), Polish botanist, plant and animal collector and biologist
- Benjamin Samuel Williams (1822–1890), English orchidologist and nurseryman in London
