= Harold Comber =

English horticulturist and plant collector (1897–1969)

Harold Frederick Comber ALS (31 December 1897 – 23 April 1969) was an English horticulturist and plant collector who was to specialise in the study of lilies Lilium sp. The eldest child of three, and only son of James and Ethel Comber, he was born at Nymans, Staplefield, Sussex, where his father was Head Gardener. He was educated at Handcross Council School until aged 12, when he entered Ardingly College for two years. He did not excel academically, failing his Oxford Local examinations, but was noted for his keen powers of observation and a retentive memory.

== Career ==
On leaving Ardingly College, Comber worked with his father at Nymans for two years, during which time he visited other famous gardens, notably Leonardslee, whose owner, Sir Edmund Loder, recommended him to Henry Elwes, who engaged him at his home, Colesbourne Park, Gloucestershire. Elwes admired his skills, and encouraged him to write an article for the Gardeners' Chronicle which was accepted for publication; Comber was just 17. Such was his precocity that at this same age he was entrusted with the management of the glasshouses and botanical collections when the older staff duly left for service in World War I. A knee injury prevented Comber himself seeing active service in the war, and he was eventually directed to 'work of national importance', namely hardening and tempering parts of Lewis guns at Earlswood.

After the cessation of hostilities, Comber joined Bletchingley Castle Gardens, before being sponsored by Elwes and Loder to study for the Diploma Horticulture at the Royal Botanic Garden Edinburgh, where he also wrote a paper on the sterility of Rhododendrons. He obtained very good marks: 100% in Cryptogam Botany, 96% in each of Botanical Nomenclature and Classification of Plants, making him the ideal candidate for two plant-hunting expeditions in the Andes sponsored by the Andes Syndicate (a group of aristocratic gardening enthusiasts, including Lord Aberconway) in 1925–26 and 1926–27. Despite the occasionally extreme privations, and accompanied only by a boy guide, Comber sent back seeds and herbarium specimens of over 1200 species, including Embothrium coccineum (Chilean Fire Bush), Nothofagus antarctica, and several species of Berberis and Eucryphia.

On completion of his studies and expeditions, Comber left Edinburgh to become head gardener for the McEacharn family at Galloway House until its sale in 1930. Later that year he made a plant-hunting expedition to Tasmania where, occasionally joined by Leonard Rodway, he collected seeds of 147 plants. On his return, he took up the post of manager of the Burnham Lily Nursery in Buckinghamshire which, owned by W. A. Constable Ltd., Tunbridge Wells, turned to vegetable production during the Second World War. After the war, Comber moved briefly to Exbury Gardens for Edmund de Rothschild, followed by another short stint with R. H. Bath Ltd. at Wisbech. In 1952, he addressed a Royal Horticultural Society lily meeting, attended by Jan de Graaff, proprietor of the Oregon Bulb Farm in the USA. De Graaff offered Comber the job of lily hybridiser, which he accepted, and he duly emigrated to Gresham, Oregon. Comber excelled at his work, rearing new strains of lily such as the Green Magic Group, reorganising record systems and streamlining production methods, until retirement beckoned in 1962. He remained very active during his retirement, writing prodigiously and listing the native plants of specific areas for the Native Plant Society of Oregon. In 1965, he travelled to Sabah, British North Borneo, to join his son James for three months collecting specimens for the Kew Herbarium, incidentally enjoying fishing and hunting trips with the natives.

== Personal life ==
Comber married Lilian Bertha Boughtwood (1894–1962) in March 1928. Their first son James (1929–2005), was an orchidologist affiliated to Kew, and their second son Richard was born in 1931. Their daughter, Mary Comber-Miles, became resident botanical artist at the University of British Columbia.

== Death ==
Harold Comber died on 23 April 1969 aged 72 in Gresham, Oregon. He was interred at the Cliffside Cemetery, Sandy.

== Selected publications ==
- Comber, H. F. (1925). Self-sterility in the rhododendrons. Gardeners' Chronicle, London, Vol. 77, p. 300,
- Comber, H. F. (1936). Embothrium coccineum and E. lanceolatum. Gardeners' Chronicle, London. Vol. 99.
- Comber, H. F. (1949). A New Classification of the Genus Lilium, in the Royal Horticultural Society Lily Yearbook

== Eponymy ==
- Solanaceae, genus Combera
- Escallonia × stricta 'Harold Comber'
- Gaultheria leucocarpa 'Harold Comber'
- Harold F. Comber Award. The North American Lily Society presents the Harold F. Comber Award to the grower of the best lily species exhibited at its annual shows.
