= Helga Dietrich =

German orchidologist and author (1940–2018)

- Born: 1940
- Died: 2018 (aged 77–78)
- Education: University of Jena
- Awards: Order of Merit of the Federal Republic of Germany (2012)
- Scientific career
- Fields: Orchidology
- Workplaces: Botanischer Garten Jena
- Thesis: The Pollen Morphology of the Plantaginaceae (1964)
- Author abbrev. (botany): H.Dietr.

Helga Dietrich (1940–2018) was a German orchidologist and author who is noted for her comprehensive guides to literature on orchids, and for her work as curator of the Botanischer Garten Jena.

== Education and Career Milestones ==
She described over eighty species of orchids, many from Cuba. The standard author abbreviation H.Dietr. is used to indicate this person as the author when citing a botanical name. She was a 2012 recipient of the Order of Merit of the Federal Republic of Germany.

Dietrich studied biology at the University of Jena from 1959 and graduated in 1964 with a diploma on the topic The Pollen Morphology of the Plantaginaceae. Afterwards she was a research assistant at the Institute of Special Botany/Botanical Garden of the University. After receiving her doctorate in 1975, she was appointed curator of the Jena Botanical Garden. Her dissertation was on the subject of On the Trait Inventory of the Plantaginaceae and its Significance for Systematics. In 1980 she received the teaching qualification, between 1989 and 1994 she completed a PhD-B procedure, which was recognized as habilitation a short time later. From 1994 to 2006 she was a lecturer at the Institute of Special Botany, since April 2006 she was a lecturer there.

== Works ==
- Dietrich, Helga (1980–1991). Bibliographia Orchidacearum: aussereuropäische Arten (in German). Universitätsbibliothek der Friedrich-Schiller-Universität. ISBN 9783910014213. OCLC 8052753.
- Dietrich, Helga (1984). Orchideenmosaik (in German). Univ.-Bibl. OCLC 263103694.
- Dathe, Susanne; Dietrich, Helga (27 February 2006). "Comparative molecular and morphological studies in selected orchids". Willdenowia. 36 (1): 89–102. doi:10.3372/wi.36.36106.
