= Caesiana =

- Discipline: Orchidology
- Language: Italian / English
- Edited by: Roma : Borgia editore

Publication details
- History: Since 1993
- Publisher: Italian Orchid Association (Italy)

Standard abbreviations
- ISO 4: Caesiana

Indexing
- ISSN: 1123-5217
- OCLC no.: 45734581

Links
- Journal homepage

Caesiana (printed as CAESIANA) is an Italian journal of orchidology and the official journal of the Italian Orchid Association.

Publication began in 1993. Since 2001 it has also become the official journal of the European Orchid Congress (EOC). The publication is printed twice a year and is available for subscription outside the European Union.

A typical issue includes roughly 60 pages of Italian/English articles, taxonomic works, EOC proceedings, culture sheets, field work, propagation about tropical, subtropical and temperate orchids with color photographs.
