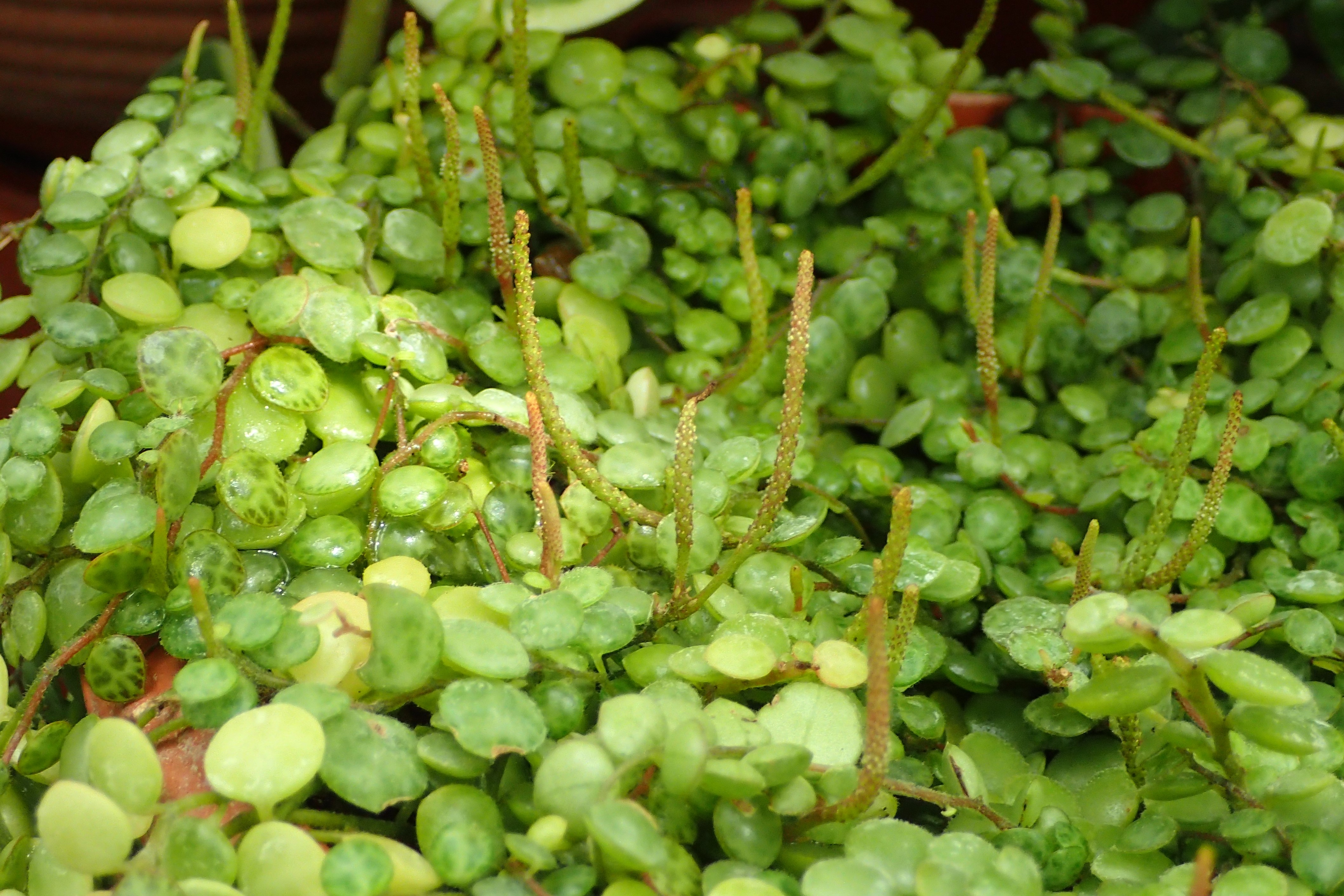

Scientific classification
- Kingdom: Plantae
- Clade: Tracheophytes
- Clade: Angiosperms
- Clade: Magnoliids
- Order: Piperales
- Family: Piperaceae
- Genus: Peperomia
- Species: P. prostrata

Binomial name
- Peperomia prostrata B.S.Williams ex Mast. & T.Moore

= Peperomia prostrata =

Species of plant

Peperomia prostrata is a species of plant in the genus Peperomia. It is endemic to Ecuador. It is sometimes called string of turtles.

Peperomia prostrata is not toxic to animals according to ASPCA.
