= Plant physiology =

Subdiscipline of botany

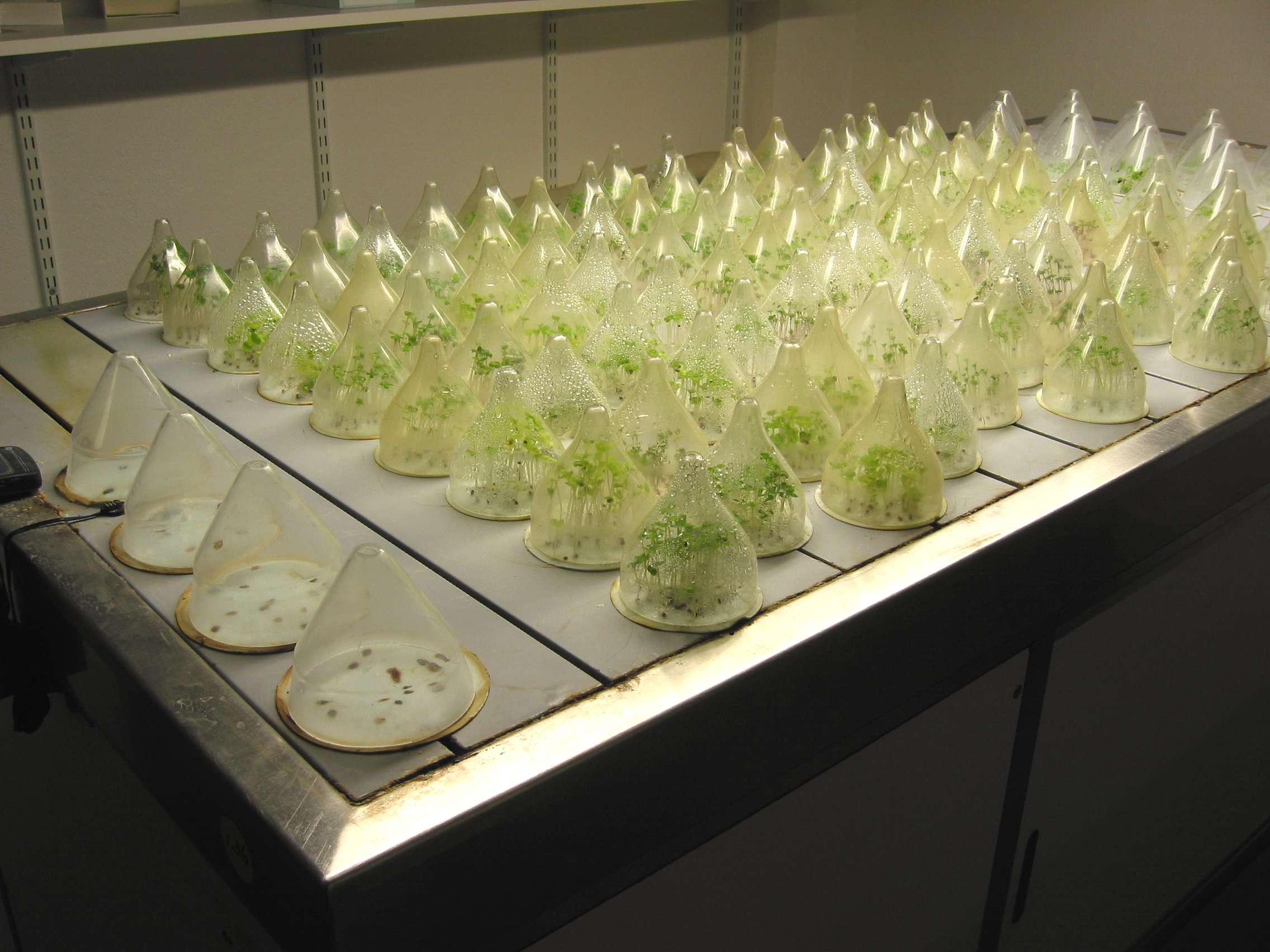
A germination rate experiment

Plant physiology is a subdiscipline of botany concerned with the functioning, or physiology, of plants. A professional in this field is called a Plant physiologist.

Plant physiologists study fundamental processes of plants, such as photosynthesis, respiration, plant nutrition, plant hormone functions, tropisms, nastic movements, photoperiodism, photomorphogenesis, circadian rhythms, environmental stress physiology, seed germination, dormancy and stomata function, and transpiration. Plant physiology interacts with the fields of plant morphology (structure of plants), plant ecology (interactions with the environment), phytochemistry (biochemistry of plants), cell biology, genetics, biophysics and molecular biology.

== Aims ==
The field of plant physiology includes the study of all the internal activities of plants—those chemical and physical processes associated with life as they occur in plants. This includes study at many levels of scale of size and time. At the smallest scale are molecular interactions of photosynthesis and internal diffusion of water, minerals, and nutrients. At the largest scale are the processes of plant development, seasonality, dormancy, and reproductive control. Major subdisciplines of plant physiology include phytochemistry (the study of the biochemistry of plants) and phytopathology (the study of disease in plants). The scope of plant physiology as a discipline may be divided into several major areas of research.

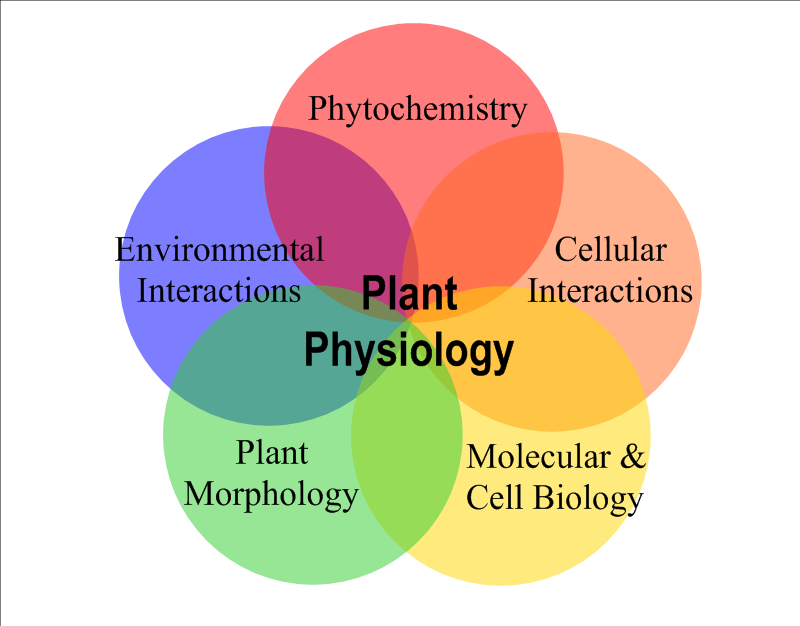
Five key areas of study within plant physiology

First, the study of phytochemistry (plant chemistry) is included within the domain of plant physiology. To function and survive, plants produce a wide array of chemical compounds not found in other organisms. Photosynthesis requires a large array of pigments, enzymes, and other compounds to function. Because they cannot move, plants must also defend themselves chemically from herbivores, pathogens and competition from other plants. They do this by producing toxins and foul-tasting or smelling chemicals. Other compounds defend plants against disease, permit survival during drought, and prepare plants for dormancy, while other compounds are used to attract pollinators or herbivores to spread ripe seeds.

Secondly, plant physiology includes the study of biological and chemical processes of individual plant cells. Plant cells have a number of features that distinguish them from cells of animals, and which lead to major differences in the way that plant life behaves and responds differently from animal life. For example, plant cells have a cell wall which maintains the shape of plant cells. Plant cells also contain chlorophyll, a chemical compound that interacts with light in a way that enables plants to manufacture their own nutrients rather than consuming other living things as animals do.

Thirdly, plant physiology deals with interactions between cells, tissues, and organs within a plant. Different cells and tissues are physically and chemically specialized to perform different functions. Roots and rhizoids function to anchor the plant and acquire minerals in the soil. Leaves catch light in order to manufacture nutrients. For both of these organs to remain living, minerals that the roots acquire must be transported to the leaves, and the nutrients manufactured in the leaves must be transported to the roots. Plants have developed a number of ways to achieve this transport, such as vascular tissue, and the functioning of the various modes of transport is studied by plant physiologists.

Fourthly, plant physiologists study the ways that plants control or regulate internal functions. Like animals, plants produce chemicals called hormones which are produced in one part of the plant to signal cells in another part of the plant to respond. Many flowering plants bloom at the appropriate time because of light-sensitive compounds that respond to the length of the night, a phenomenon known as photoperiodism. The ripening of fruit and loss of leaves in the winter are controlled in part by the production of the gas ethylene by the plant.

Finally, plant physiology includes the study of plant response to environmental conditions and their variation, a field known as environmental physiology. Stress from water loss, changes in air chemistry, or crowding by other plants can lead to changes in the way a plant functions. These changes may be affected by genetic, chemical, and physical factors.

== Biochemistry of plants ==
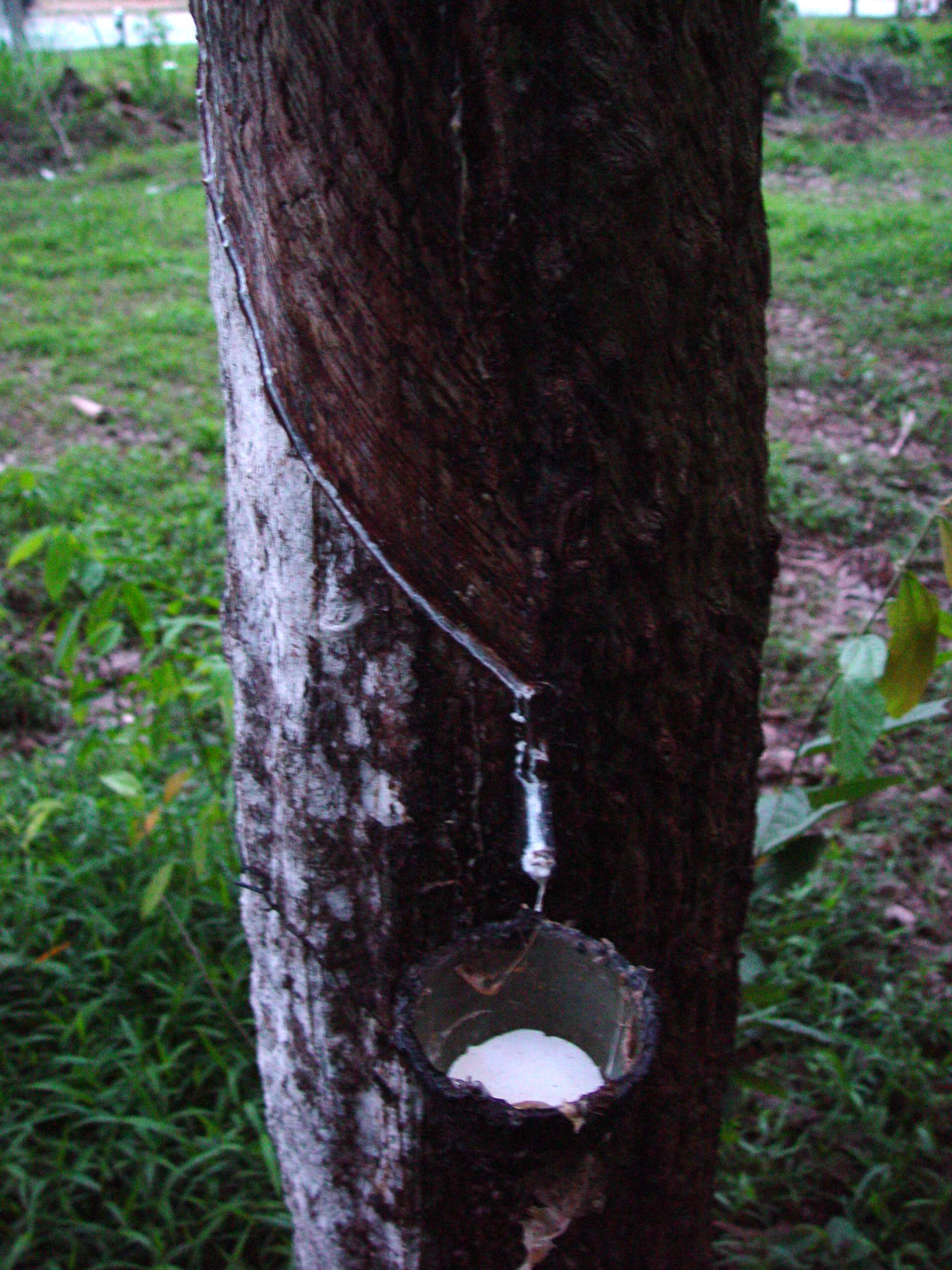
Latex being collected from a tapped rubber tree

The chemical elements of which plants are constructed—principally carbon, oxygen, hydrogen, nitrogen, phosphorus, sulfur, etc.—are the same as for all other life forms: animals, fungi, bacteria and even viruses. Only the details of their individual molecular structures vary.

Despite this underlying similarity, plants produce a vast array of chemical compounds with unique properties which they use to cope with their environment. Pigments are used by plants to absorb or detect light, and are extracted by humans for use in dyes. Other plant products may be used for the manufacture of commercially important rubber or biofuel. Perhaps the most celebrated compounds from plants are those with pharmacological activity, such as salicylic acid from which aspirin is made, morphine, and digoxin. Drug companies spend billions of dollars each year researching plant compounds for potential medicinal benefits.

=== Constituent elements ===
Plants require some nutrients, such as carbon and nitrogen, in large quantities to survive. Some nutrients are termed macronutrients, where the prefix macro- (large) refers to the quantity needed, not the size of the nutrient particles themselves. Other nutrients, called micronutrients, are required only in trace amounts for plants to remain healthy. Such micronutrients are usually absorbed as ions dissolved in water taken from the soil, though carnivorous plants acquire some of their micronutrients from captured prey.

The following tables list element nutrients essential to plants. Uses within plants are generalized.

Macronutrients – necessary in large quantities
Element	Form of uptake	Notes
Nitrogen	NO_{3}^{−}, NH_{4}^{+}	Nucleic acids, proteins, hormones, etc.
Oxygen	O_{2,} H_{2}O	Cellulose, starch, other organic compounds
Carbon	CO_{2}	Cellulose, starch, other organic compounds
Hydrogen	H_{2}O	Cellulose, starch, other organic compounds
Potassium	K^{+}	Cofactor in protein synthesis, water balance, etc.
Calcium	Ca^{2+}	Membrane synthesis and stabilization
Magnesium	Mg^{2+}	Element essential for chlorophyll
Phosphorus	H_{2}PO_{4}^{−}	Nucleic acids, phospholipids, ATP
Sulphur	SO_{4}^{2−}	Constituent of proteins

Micronutrients – necessary in small quantities
Element	Form of uptake	Notes
Chlorine	Cl^{−}	Photosystem II and stomata function
Iron	Fe^{2+}, Fe^{3+}	Chlorophyll formation and nitrogen fixation
Boron	HBO_{3}	Crosslinking pectin
Manganese	Mn^{2+}	Activity of some enzymes and photosystem II
Zinc	Zn^{2+}	Involved in the synthesis of enzymes and chlorophyll
Copper	Cu^{+}	Enzymes for lignin synthesis
Molybdenum	MoO_{4}^{2−}	Nitrogen fixation, reduction of nitrates
Nickel	Ni^{2+}	Enzymatic cofactor in the metabolism of nitrogen compounds

=== Pigments ===
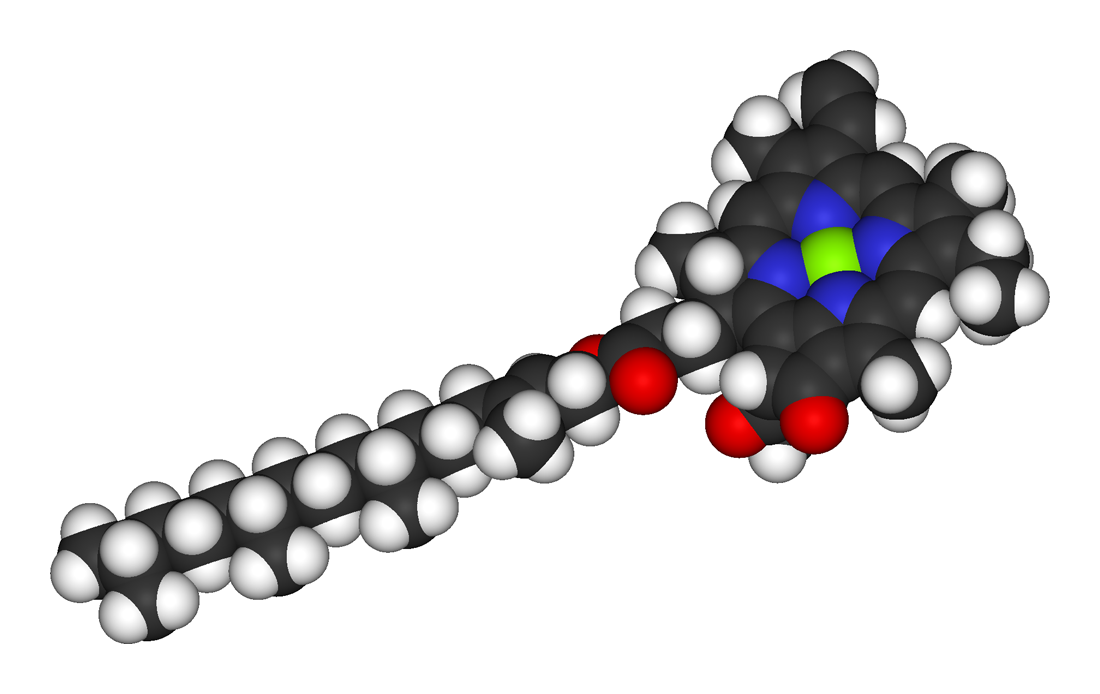
Space-filling model of the chlorophyll molecule

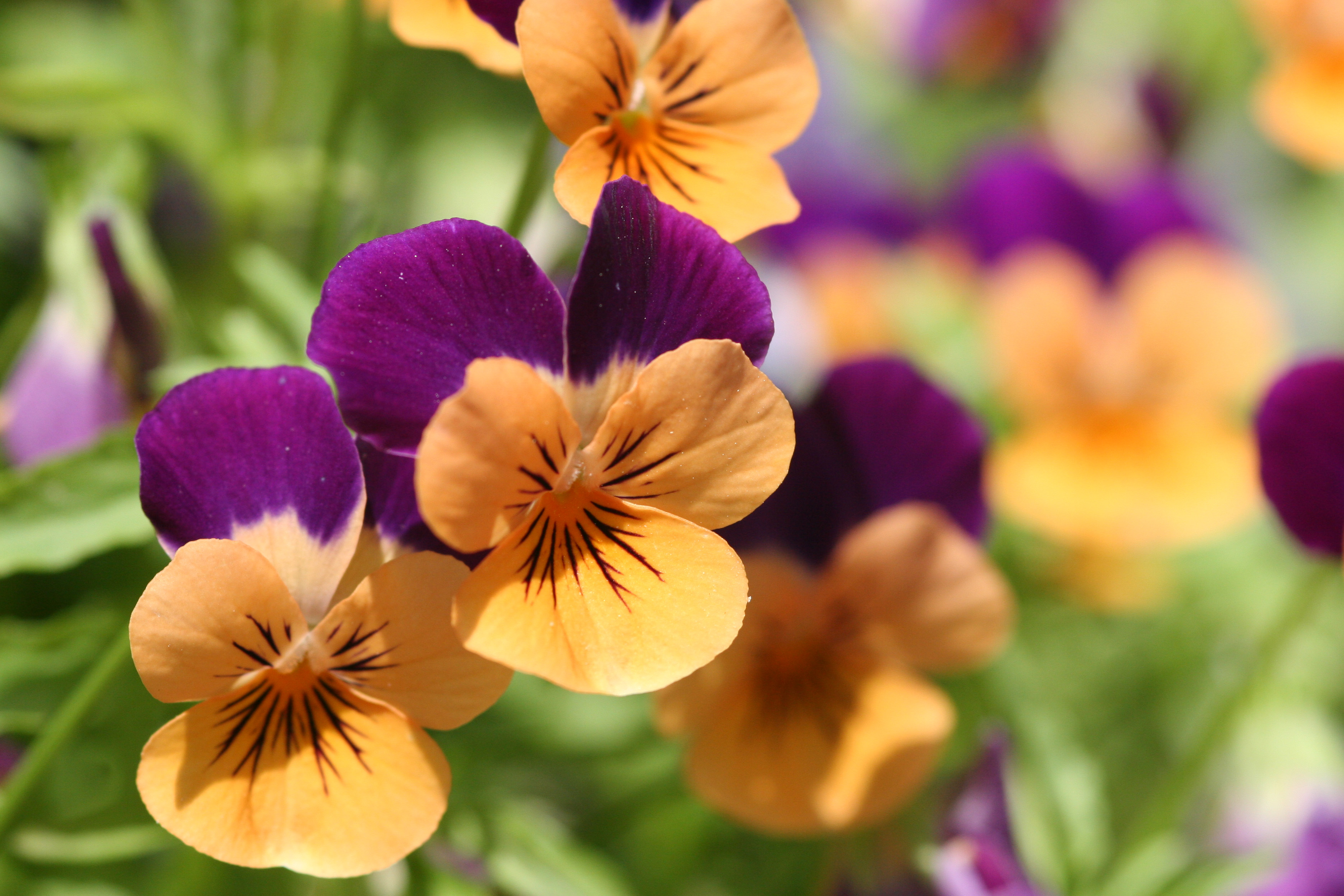
Anthocyanin gives these pansies their dark purple pigmentation.

Among the most important molecules for plant function are the pigments. Plant pigments include a variety of different kinds of molecules, including porphyrins, carotenoids, and anthocyanins. All biological pigments selectively absorb certain wavelengths of light while reflecting others. The light that is absorbed may be used by the plant to power chemical reactions, while the reflected wavelengths of light determine the color the pigment appears to the eye.

Chlorophyll is the primary pigment in plants; it is a porphyrin that absorbs red and blue wavelengths of light while reflecting green. It is the presence and relative abundance of chlorophyll that gives plants their green color. All land plants and green algae possess two forms of this pigment: chlorophyll a and chlorophyll b. Kelps, diatoms, and other photosynthetic heterokonts contain chlorophyll c instead of b, red algae possess chlorophyll a. All chlorophylls serve as the primary means plants use to intercept light to fuel photosynthesis.

Carotenoids are red, orange, or yellow tetraterpenoids. They function as accessory pigments in plants, helping to fuel photosynthesis by gathering wavelengths of light not readily absorbed by chlorophyll. The most familiar carotenoids are carotene (an orange pigment found in carrots), lutein (a yellow pigment found in fruits and vegetables), and lycopene (the red pigment responsible for the color of tomatoes). Carotenoids have been shown to act as antioxidants and to promote healthy eyesight in humans.

Anthocyanins (literally "flower blue") are water-soluble flavonoid pigments that appear red to blue, according to pH. They occur in all tissues of higher plants, providing color in leaves, stems, roots, flowers, and fruits, though not always in sufficient quantities to be noticeable. Anthocyanins are most visible in the petals of flowers, where they may make up as much as 30% of the dry weight of the tissue. They are also responsible for the purple color seen on the underside of tropical shade plants such as Tradescantia zebrina. In these plants, the anthocyanin catches light that has passed through the leaf and reflects it back towards regions bearing chlorophyll, in order to maximize the use of available light

Betalains are red or yellow pigments. Like anthocyanins they are water-soluble, but unlike anthocyanins they are indole-derived compounds synthesized from tyrosine. This class of pigments is found only in the Caryophyllales (including cactus and amaranth), and never co-occur in plants with anthocyanins. Betalains are responsible for the deep red color of beets, and are used commercially as food-coloring agents. Plant physiologists are uncertain of the function that betalains have in plants which possess them, but there is some preliminary evidence that they may have fungicidal properties.

== Signals and regulators ==
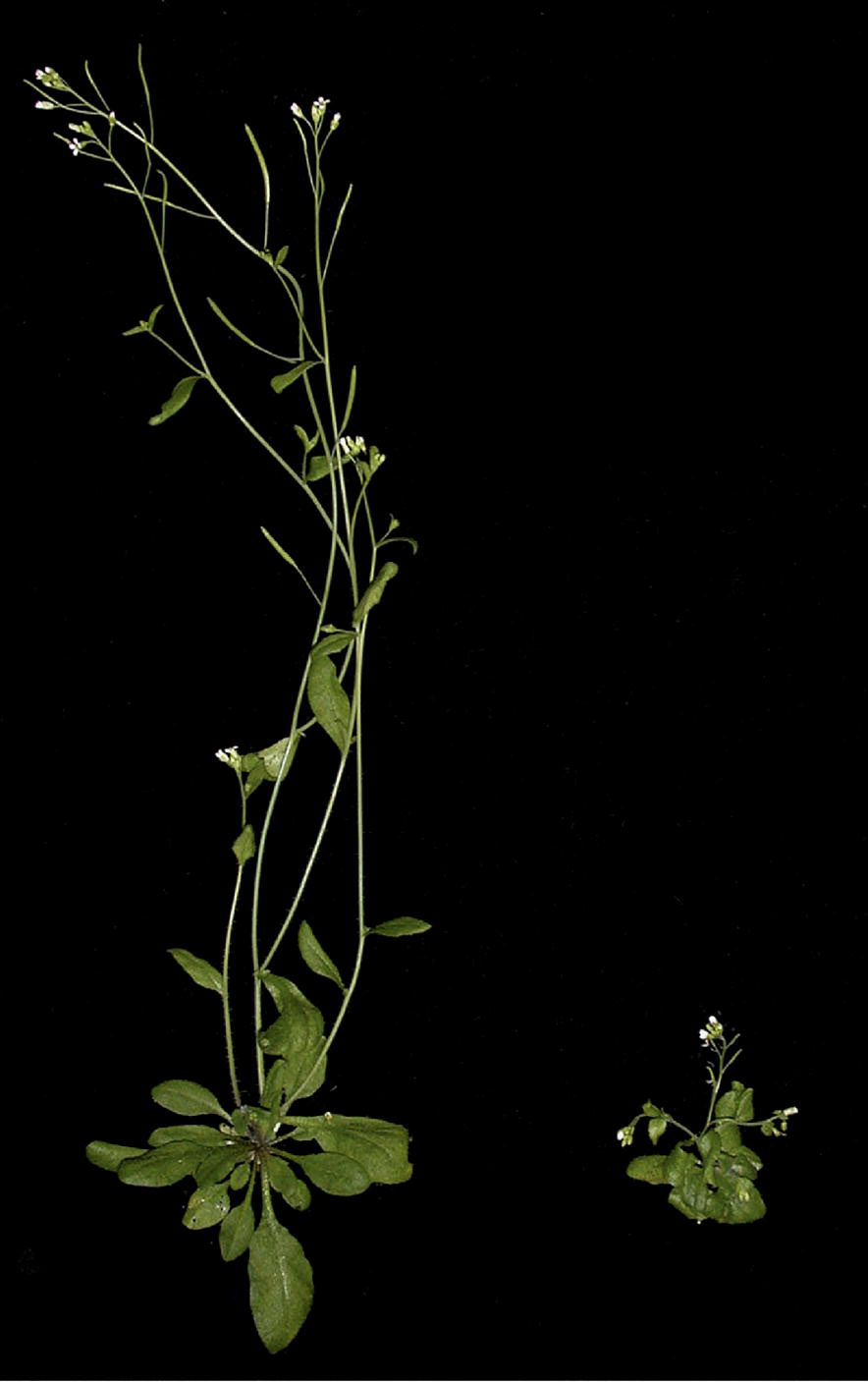
A mutation that stops Arabidopsis thaliana responding to auxin causes abnormal growth (right)

Plants produce hormones and other growth regulators which act to signal a physiological response in their tissues. They also produce compounds such as phytochrome that are sensitive to light and which serve to trigger growth or development in response to environmental signals.

=== Plant hormones ===
Plant hormones, known as plant growth regulators (PGRs) or phytohormones, are chemicals that regulate a plant's growth. According to a standard animal definition, hormones are signal molecules produced at specific locations, that occur in very low concentrations, and cause altered processes in target cells at other locations. Unlike animals, plants lack specific hormone-producing tissues or organs. Plant hormones are often not transported to other parts of the plant and production is not limited to specific locations.

Plant hormones are chemicals that in small amounts promote and influence the growth, development and differentiation of cells and tissues. Hormones are vital to plant growth; affecting processes in plants from flowering to seed development, dormancy, and germination. They regulate which tissues grow upwards and which grow downwards, leaf formation and stem growth, fruit development and ripening, as well as leaf abscission and even plant death.

The most important plant hormones are abscissic acid (ABA), auxins, ethylene, gibberellins, and cytokinins, though there are many other substances that serve to regulate plant physiology.

=== Photomorphogenesis ===
While most people know that light is important for photosynthesis in plants, few realize that plant sensitivity to light plays a role in the control of plant structural development (morphogenesis). The use of light to control structural development is called photomorphogenesis, and is dependent upon the presence of specialized photoreceptors, which are chemical pigments capable of absorbing specific wavelengths of light.

Plants use four kinds of photoreceptors: phytochrome, cryptochrome, a UV-B photoreceptor, and protochlorophyllide a. The first two of these, phytochrome and cryptochrome, are photoreceptor proteins, complex molecular structures formed by joining a protein with a light-sensitive pigment. Cryptochrome is also known as the UV-A photoreceptor, because it absorbs ultraviolet light in the long wave "A" region. The UV-B receptor is one or more compounds not yet identified with certainty, though some evidence suggests carotene or riboflavin as candidates. Protochlorophyllide a, as its name suggests, is a chemical precursor of chlorophyll.

The most studied of the photoreceptors in plants is phytochrome. It is sensitive to light in the red and far-red region of the visible spectrum. Many flowering plants use it to regulate the time of flowering based on the length of day and night (photoperiodism) and to set circadian rhythms. It also regulates other responses including the germination of seeds, elongation of seedlings, the size, shape and number of leaves, the synthesis of chlorophyll, and the straightening of the epicotyl or hypocotyl hook of dicot seedlings.

=== Photoperiodism ===
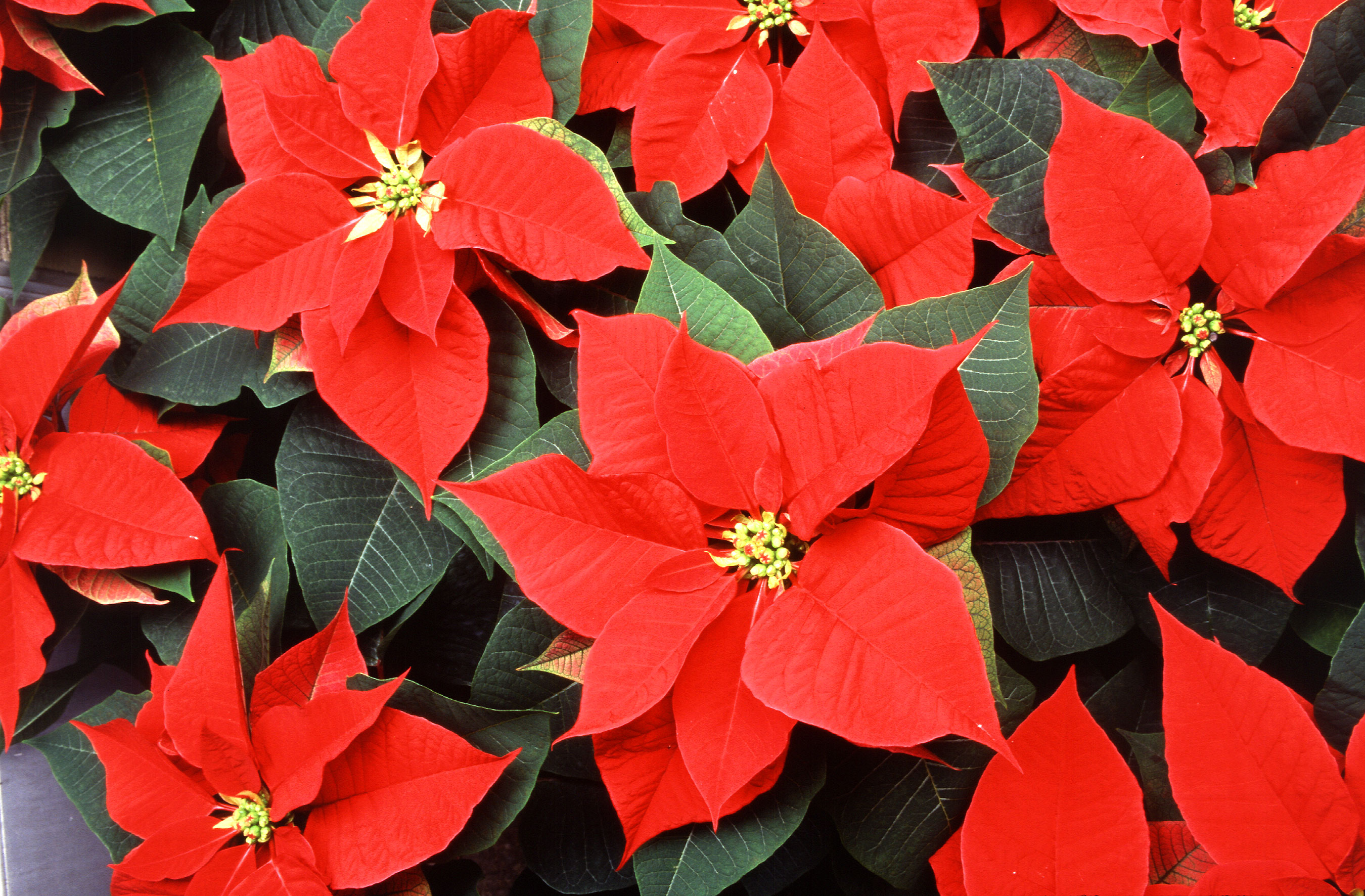
The poinsettia is a short-day plant, requiring two months of long nights prior to blooming.

Many flowering plants use the pigment phytochrome to sense seasonal changes in day length, which they take as signals to flower. This sensitivity to day length is termed photoperiodism. Broadly speaking, flowering plants can be classified as long day plants, short day plants, or day neutral plants, depending on their particular response to changes in day length. Long day plants require a certain minimum length of daylight to start flowering, so these plants flower in the spring or summer. Conversely, short day plants flower when the length of daylight falls below a certain critical level. Day neutral plants do not initiate flowering based on photoperiodism, though some may use temperature sensitivity (vernalization) instead.

Although a short day plant cannot flower during the long days of summer, it is not actually the period of light exposure that limits flowering. Rather, a short day plant requires a minimal length of uninterrupted darkness in each 24-hour period (a short daylength) before floral development can begin. It has been determined experimentally that a short day plant (long night) does not flower if a flash of phytochrome activating light is used on the plant during the night.

Plants make use of the phytochrome system to sense day length or photoperiod. This fact is utilized by florists and greenhouse gardeners to control and even induce flowering out of season, such as the poinsettia (Euphorbia pulcherrima).

== Environmental physiology ==
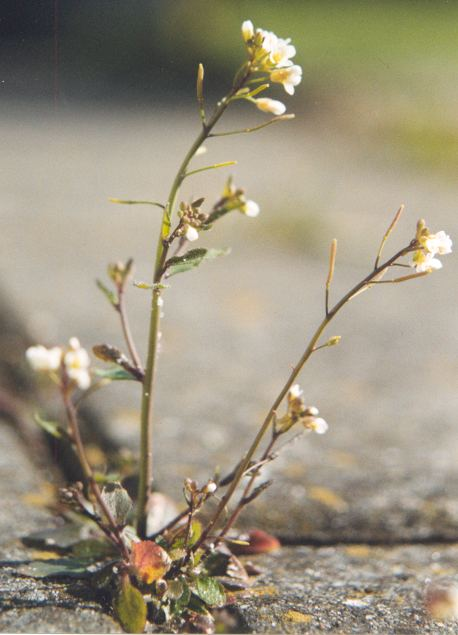
Phototropism in Arabidopsis thaliana is regulated by blue to UV light.

Paradoxically, the subdiscipline of environmental physiology is on the one hand a recent field of study in plant ecology and on the other hand one of the oldest. Environmental physiology is the preferred name of the subdiscipline among plant physiologists, but it goes by a number of other names in the applied sciences. It is roughly synonymous with ecophysiology, crop ecology, horticulture and agronomy. The particular name applied to the subdiscipline is specific to the viewpoint and goals of research. Whatever name is applied, it deals with the ways in which plants respond to their environment and so overlaps with the field of ecology.

Environmental physiologists examine plant response to physical factors such as radiation (including light and ultraviolet radiation), temperature, fire, and wind. Of particular importance are water relations (which can be measured with the Pressure bomb) and the stress of drought or inundation, exchange of gases with the atmosphere, as well as the cycling of nutrients such as nitrogen and carbon.

Environmental physiologists also examine plant response to biological factors. This includes not only negative interactions, such as competition, herbivory, disease and parasitism, but also positive interactions, such as mutualism and pollination.

While plants, as living beings, can perceive and communicate physical stimuli and damage, they do not feel pain as members of the animal kingdom do simply because of the lack of any pain receptors, nerves, or a brain, and, by extension, lack of consciousness. Many plants are known to perceive and respond to mechanical stimuli at a cellular level, and some plants such as the venus flytrap or touch-me-not, are known for their "obvious sensory abilities". Nevertheless, the plant kingdom as a whole do not feel pain notwithstanding their abilities to respond to sunlight, gravity, wind, and any external stimuli such as insect bites, since they lack any nervous system. The primary reason for this is that, unlike the members of the animal kingdom whose evolutionary successes and failures are shaped by suffering, the evolution of plants are simply shaped by life and death.

=== Tropisms and nastic movements ===
Plants may respond both to directional and non-directional stimuli. A response to a directional stimulus, such as gravity or sun light, is called a tropism. A response to a nondirectional stimulus, such as temperature or humidity, is a nastic movement.

Tropisms in plants are the result of differential cell growth, in which the cells on one side of the plant elongates more than those on the other side, causing the part to bend toward the side with less growth. Among the common tropisms seen in plants is phototropism, the bending of the plant toward a source of light. Phototropism allows the plant to maximize light exposure in plants which require additional light for photosynthesis, or to minimize it in plants subjected to intense light and heat. Geotropism allows the roots of a plant to determine the direction of gravity and grow downwards. Tropisms generally result from an interaction between the environment and production of one or more plant hormones.

Nastic movements results from differential cell growth (e.g. epinasty and hiponasty), or from changes in turgor pressure within plant tissues (e.g., nyctinasty), which may occur rapidly. A familiar example is thigmonasty (response to touch) in the Venus fly trap, a carnivorous plant. The traps consist of modified leaf blades which bear sensitive trigger hairs. When the hairs are touched by an insect or other animal, the leaf folds shut. This mechanism allows the plant to trap and digest small insects for additional nutrients. Although the trap is rapidly shut by changes in internal cell pressures, the leaf must grow slowly to reset for a second opportunity to trap insects.

=== Plant disease ===
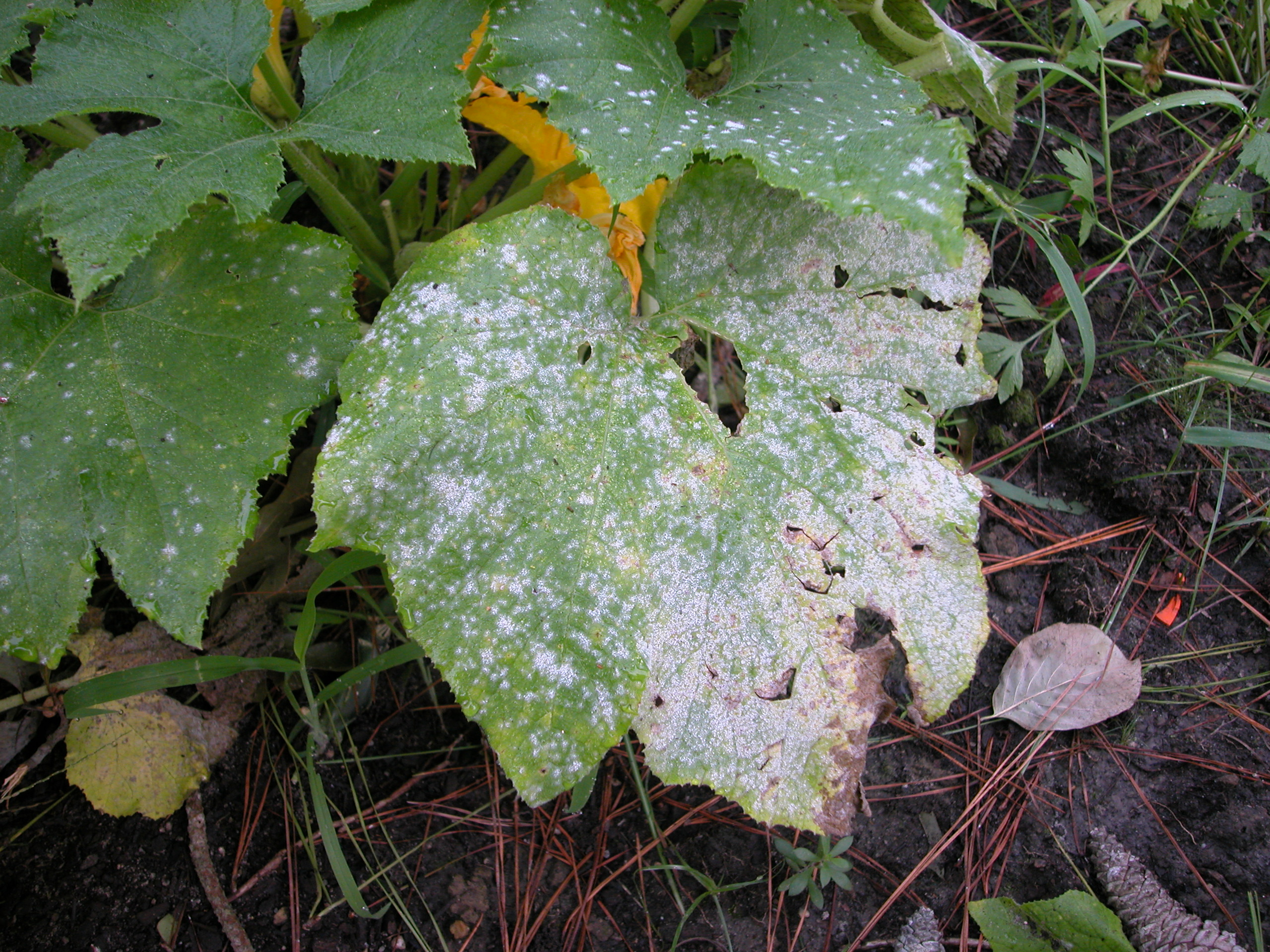
Powdery mildew on crop leaves

Economically, one of the most important areas of research in environmental physiology is that of phytopathology, the study of diseases in plants and the manner in which plants resist or cope with infection. Plant are susceptible to the same kinds of disease organisms as animals, including viruses, bacteria, and fungi, as well as physical invasion by insects and roundworms.

Because the biology of plants differs with animals, their symptoms and responses are quite different. In some cases, a plant can simply shed infected leaves or flowers to prevent the spread of disease, in a process called abscission. Most animals do not have this option as a means of controlling disease. Plant diseases organisms themselves also differ from those causing disease in animals because plants cannot usually spread infection through casual physical contact. Plant pathogens tend to spread via spores or are carried by animal vectors.

One of the most important advances in the control of plant disease was the discovery of Bordeaux mixture in the nineteenth century. The mixture is the first known fungicide and is a combination of copper sulfate and lime. Application of the mixture served to inhibit the growth of downy mildew that threatened to seriously damage the French wine industry.

== History ==
=== Early history ===
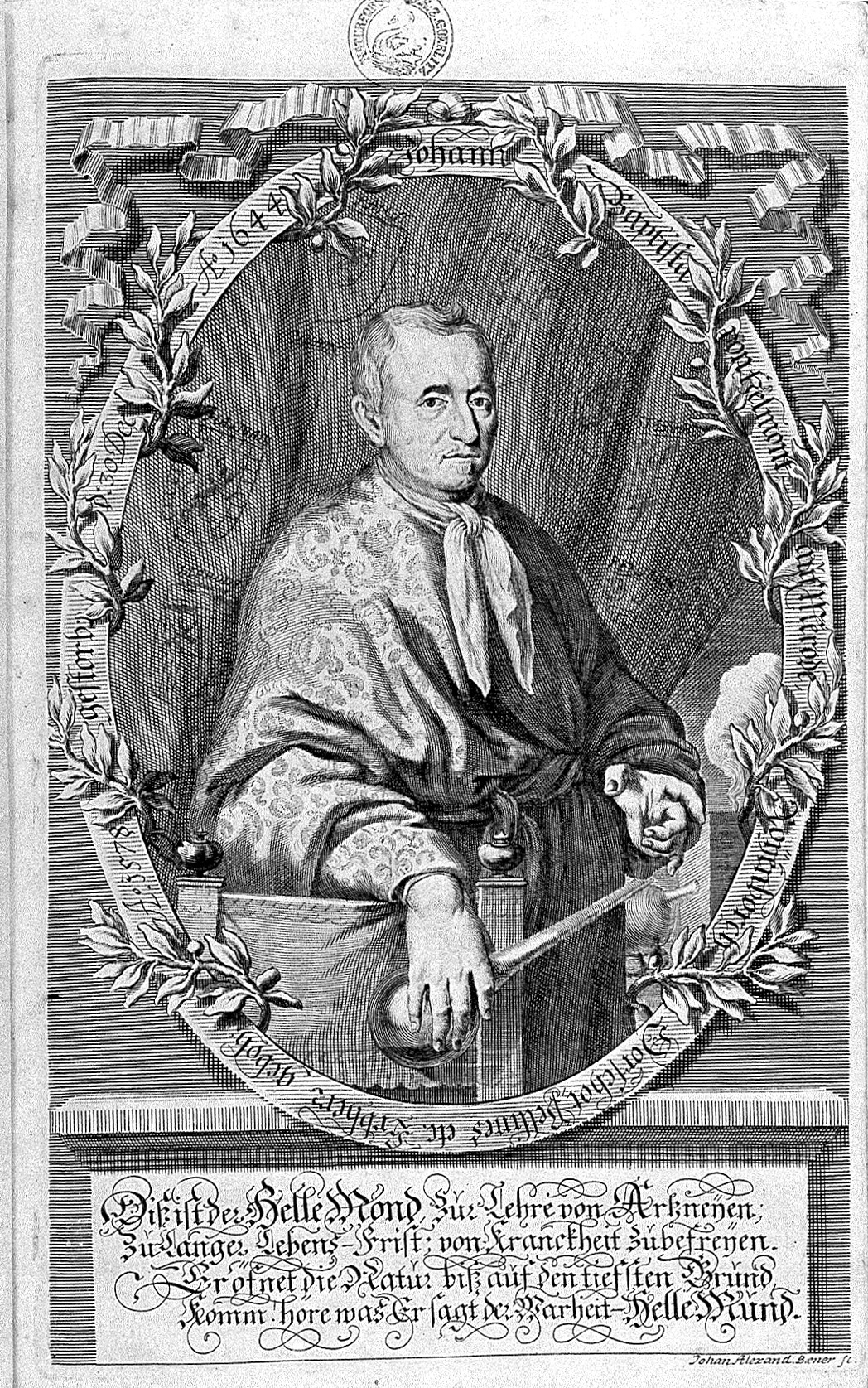
Jan Baptist van Helmont

Francis Bacon published one of the first plant physiology experiments in 1627 in the book, Sylva Sylvarum. Bacon grew several terrestrial plants, including a rose, in water and concluded that soil was only needed to keep the plant upright. Jan Baptist van Helmont published what is considered the first quantitative experiment in plant physiology in 1648. He grew a willow tree for five years in a pot containing 200 pounds of oven-dry soil. The soil lost just two ounces of dry weight and van Helmont concluded that plants get all their weight from water, not soil. In 1699, John Woodward published experiments on growth of spearmint in different sources of water. He found that plants grew much better in water with soil added than in distilled water.

Stephen Hales is considered the Father of Plant Physiology for the many experiments in the 1727 book, Vegetable Staticks; though Julius von Sachs unified the pieces of plant physiology and put them together as a discipline. His Lehrbuch der Botanik was the plant physiology bible of its time.

Researchers discovered in the 1800s that plants absorb essential mineral nutrients as inorganic ions in water. In natural conditions, soil acts as a mineral nutrient reservoir but the soil itself is not essential to plant growth. When the mineral nutrients in the soil are dissolved in water, plant roots absorb nutrients readily, soil is no longer required for the plant to thrive. This observation is the basis for hydroponics, the growing of plants in a water solution rather than soil, which has become a standard technique in biological research, teaching lab exercises, crop production and as a hobby.

== Economic applications ==
=== Food production ===
In horticulture and agriculture along with food science, plant physiology is an important topic relating to fruits, vegetables, and other consumable parts of plants. Topics studied include: climatic requirements, fruit drop, nutrition, ripening, fruit set. The production of food crops also hinges on the study of plant physiology covering such topics as optimal planting and harvesting times and post harvest storage of plant products for human consumption and the production of secondary products like drugs and cosmetics.

Crop physiology steps back and looks at a field of plants as a whole, rather than looking at each plant individually. Crop physiology looks at how plants respond to each other and how to maximize results like food production through determining things like optimal planting density.

== See also ==
- Biomechanics
- Hyperaccumulator
- Phytochemistry
- Plant anatomy
- Plant morphology
- Plant secondary metabolism
- Branches of botany
