= John Lindley =

English botanist, gardener and orchidologist (1799–1865)

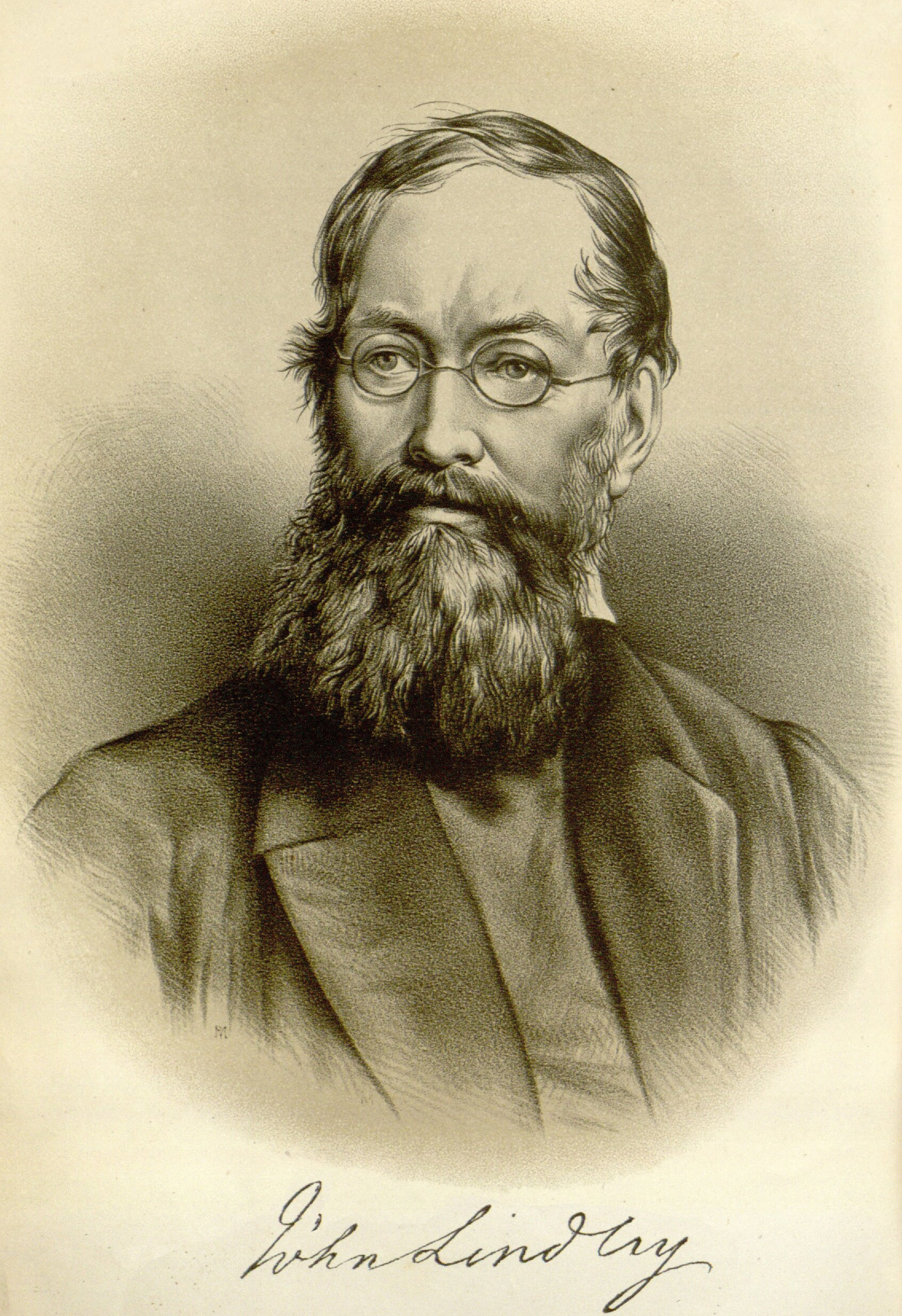
- Born: 5 February 1799; Catton, Norfolk, England
- Died: 1 November 1865 (aged 66); Chiswick, Middlesex, England
- Education: Norwich School
- Awards: Royal Medal (1857)
- Scientific career
- Fields: Botany; Orchidology
- Workplaces: Royal Horticultural Society
- Author abbrev. (botany): Lindl.

John Lindley FRS (5 February 1799 – 1 November 1865) was an English botanist, gardener and orchidologist.

== Early years ==
Born in Catton, near Norwich, England, John Lindley was one of four children of George and Mary Lindley. George Lindley was a nurseryman and pomologist and ran a commercial nursery garden. Although he had great horticultural knowledge, the undertaking was not profitable and George lived in a state of indebtedness. As a boy, John would assist in the garden and also collected wild flowers he found growing in the Norfolk countryside. Lindley was educated at Norwich School. He would have liked to go to university or to buy a commission in the army but the family could not afford either. He became the Belgian agent for a London seed merchant in 1815.

At this time Lindley became acquainted with the botanist William Jackson Hooker who allowed him to use his botanical library and who introduced him to Sir Joseph Banks who offered him employment as an assistant in his herbarium. His first publication, in 1819, a translation of the Analyse du fruit by Louis Claude Richard, was followed in 1820 by an original Monographia Rosarum, with descriptions of new species, and drawings executed by himself, then in 1821 by Monographia Digitalium and Observations on Pomaceae, which were both contributed to the Linnean Society.

== Career ==
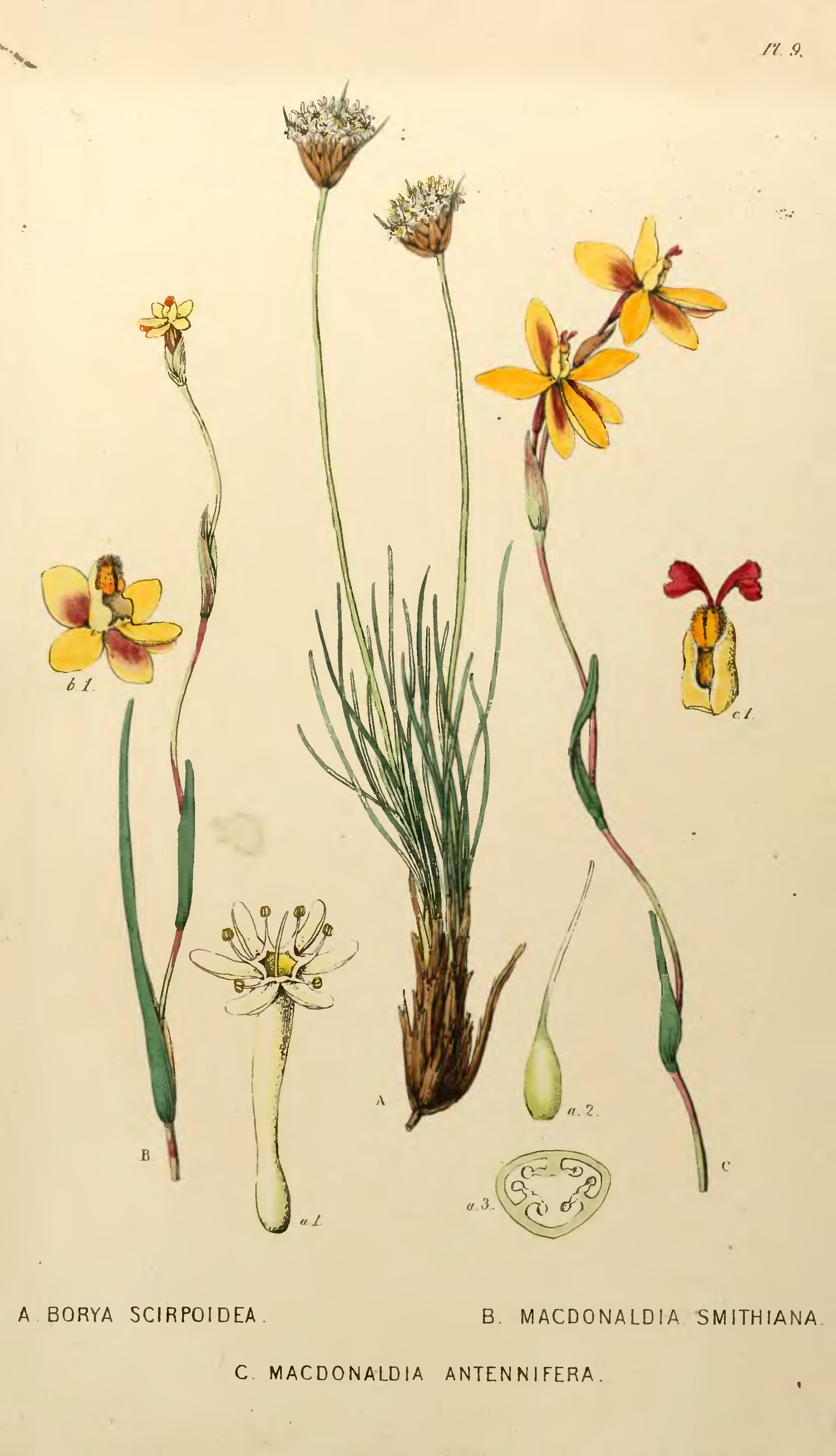
Plate from 'A sketch of the vegetation of the Swan River Colony' by John Lindley

Lindley went to work at Banks' house in London. He concentrated on the genera Rosa and Digitalis and published the monograph "A Botanical History of Roses" which distinguished seventy-six species, describes thirteen new ones and was illustrated by nineteen coloured plates painted by himself. He became acquainted with Joseph Sabine who grew a large assortment of roses and was the Secretary of the Horticultural Society of London. His employment came to an abrupt end with the death of Banks a few months later. One of Banks' friends, a wealthy merchant called William Cattley, paid Lindley to draw and describe new plants in his garden at Barnet. He also paid for the publication of "Digitalia Monographia". (Later Lindley honoured him by naming the orchid genus Cattleya after him.) In 1820, at the age of twenty-one, Lindley was elected a fellow of the Linnean Society of London.

From 1821 to 1826, he published a folio work with coloured illustrations that he had painted himself, "Collectanea botanica or Figures and botanic Illustrations of rare and curious exotic Plants". Many of these plants came from the family Orchidaceae with which he had a lifelong fascination.

Lindley was appointed assistant secretary to the Royal Horticultural Society and its new garden at Chiswick in 1822, where he supervised the collection of plants.

Assistant secretary to the Horticultural Society since 1822, in 1829 Lindley was appointed to the chair of botany at University College, London, which he retained until 1860. He also lectured on botany from 1831 at the Royal Institution, including delivering the 1833 Royal Institution Christmas Lecture, and from 1836 at the Chelsea Physic Garden, starting the society's flower show in the late 1830s.

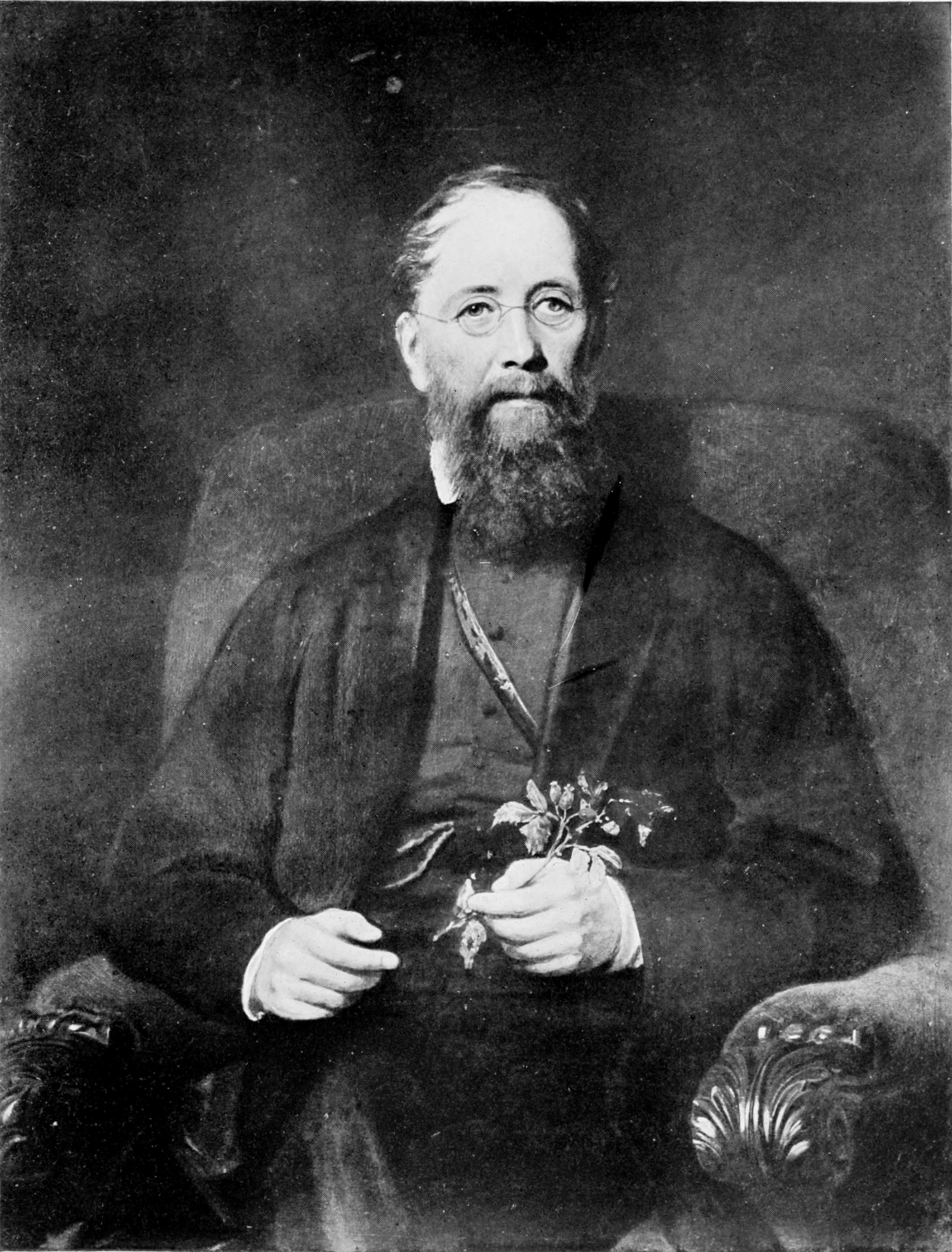
Portrait from the Makers of British botany (1913)

Lindley described the plants collected on Thomas Livingstone Mitchell's expeditions of 1838 and wrote an Appendix to Edwards's Botanical Register of 1839, describing plants collected by James Drummond and Georgiana Molloy of the Swan River Colony in Western Australia. According to John Ryan, Lindley's 1840 'Sketch of the Vegetation of the Swan River Colony' provided 'the most succinct portrait to date of the flora of the Swan River Settlement', which had been established in 1829. The Sketch, which was published during November 1839 and January 1840 in Edwards' Botanical Register and separately on its completion, was illustrated by nine hand-coloured lithographs and four wood-cuts. He also played a large part in having Charles Moore appointed as Director of the Sydney Botanical Gardens.

During his professorship, he wrote many scientific and popular works as well as making significant contributions to the Botanical Register, of which he was the editor for many years, and to The Gardeners' Chronicle, which he co-founded with Joseph Paxton, William Bradbury and Wentworth Dilke, and where he was in charge of the horticultural department from 1841. He was a fellow of the Royal, Linnean and Geological Societies. He received the Royal Society's royal medal in 1857, and in 1853 became a corresponding member of the Institut de France. In 1862, he was elected as a member of the American Philosophical Society.

=== Horticultural Society of London ===
About this time, the Horticultural Society of London, which became the Royal Horticultural Society at a later date, asked Lindley to draw roses and in 1822 he became the Assistant Secretary of the Society's garden. The Society's historian, Harold R Fletcher, later described him as " ... the backbone of the Society and possibly the greatest servant it had ever had." Now with a steady income, in 1823 he married Sarah Freestone (1797–1869). They rented a house in rural Acton Green, a location convenient for the Society's garden at Turnham Green.

The Secretary of the Horticultural Society of London at that time was Joseph Sabine and he authorised expenditure on large projects beyond the Society's means. Lindley could only expostulate and was unsuccessful in moderating his actions. By 1830, the Society had mounting debts and a committee of enquiry was set up. Sabine resigned as Secretary and Lindley successfully defended his own position and carried the Society forward with the new Honorary Secretary, George Bentham.

== Middle years ==
An eminent botanist of the time, John Claudius Loudon, sought Lindley's collaboration on his "Encyclopedia of Plants". This covered nearly fifteen thousand species of flowering plants and ferns. It was a massive undertaking and Lindley was responsible for most of it.

During his labour on this undertaking, which was completed in 1829, and through arduous study of character patterns, he became convinced of the superiority of the "natural" classification system devised by Antoine Laurent de Jussieu – a system that he believed reflected the great plan of nature as distinct from the "artificial" system of Linnaeus followed in the Encyclopaedia of Plants. This conviction found expression in A Synopsis of British Flora, arranged according to the Natural Order (1829) and in An Introduction to the Natural System of Botany (1830).

In 1828, Lindley was elected a fellow of the Royal Society of London and in 1833 was awarded the honorary degree of Doctor of Philosophy from the Ludwig-Maximilians-Universität München. Other honours came from France, the United States and Switzerland.

In 1829, Lindley sought to augment his income and became professor of botany at the newly established London University while still continuing his post at the Royal Horticultural Society. He had not been to university himself but apparently was an excellent teacher, giving six hour-long lectures each week. Being dissatisfied with what was available, he wrote some botanical textbooks for his students.

After the death of Joseph Banks and the death also of their patron, King George III, the Royal Botanic Gardens at Kew went into a decline. The Government commissioned a report on their future to be prepared by Lindley, Joseph Paxton and John Wilson, head gardener to the Earl of Surrey. The report recommended that the Gardens be retained but the Government did not accept their findings and proposed to abolish it, distribute the plants and pull down the glasshouses. On 11 February 1840, Lindley told the Prime Minister that the matter was to be raised in Parliament. This caused an outcry. The public was indignant, the Government backed down and the Gardens were saved. William Jackson Hooker was appointed to be the new Director.

In 1845, Lindley was part of a scientific commission set up by the Government to investigate potato blight and the Irish famine. The cause of the fungal disease was not known at the time and the weather was thought to be to blame. Although the commission was powerless to solve the problem, their report brought about the repeal of the 1815 Corn Laws which had forbidden the import of cheap wheat from America. This helped to alleviate the effects of the disease on populations that had become reliant on the monoculture of potatoes. He was elected a Foreign Honorary Member of the American Academy of Arts and Sciences in 1859.

Lindley was very industrious and published a number of works including The Genera and Species of Orchidaceous Plants, the writing of which occupied him for ten years. He was acknowledged to be the top authority on the classification of orchids of his time. Bentham and Hooker, writing in 1883, accepted 114 genera he had named and described, and Pfitzer, in 1889, accepted 127. Over many years, Lindley had described a large number of orchid species, and many other plants, naming them and giving each a concise description of the plant's characteristics.

He was held in high regard by other botanists and was honoured by naming more than 200 species with the epithets "lindleyi", "lindleyana", "lindleyanum", "lindleyanus", "lindleya" and "lindleyoides".

== Later years ==
In 1861, Lindley took charge of organising the exhibits from the British colonies for the International Exhibition at South Kensington. This was exhausting work and seems to have taken a toll on his health. His memory also began deteriorating. He resigned his university professorship that year and his position as Secretary to the Royal Horticultural Society two years later.

In 1863, he travelled to Vichy, a spa in the center of France, but his health continued to decline. He died at his home at Acton Green, near London, aged 66. He was survived by his wife, two daughters including Barbara (1830–1927; later Barbara Thompson), who assisted in the illustration of some of his later works, and Sarah Lindley Crease and a son. The daughters were accomplished artists themselves and the son, Nathaniel, became a distinguished lawyer, the Master of the Rolls and a life peer.

== List of selected publications ==
- Translation of Analyse du fruit by L. C. M. Richard (1819)
- Rosarum Monographia (1820)
- Digitalium Monographia (1821)
- Observations on the natural Group of Plants called Pomaceæ (1821)
- Instructions for packing living plants in foreign countries, especially within the tropics; and directions for their treatment during the voyage to Europe (1824)
- Monographie du genre rosier, traduit de l'anglais de J. Lindley ...par M. de Pronville (1824) With Auguste de Pronville
- A Botanical History of Roses
- Digitalia Monographia
- Collectanea botanica or Figures and botanic Illustrations of rare and curious exotic Plants (1821–1826) With Richard and Arthur Taylor
- A Synopsis of British Flora, arranged according to the Natural Order (1829)
- An Outline of the First Principles of Horticulture (1832)
- An Outline of the Structure and Physiology of Plants (1832)
- Lindley, John (1833). Nixus plantarum. London: Apud Ridgway et filios.
- Einleitung in das natürliche System der Botanik (1833)
- Lindley, John (1835). The Genera and Species of Orchidaceous Plants. Ridgways, Piccadilly.
- Lindley, John (1836). A Systematic View of the Organisation, Natural Affinities, and Geographical Distribution, of the Whole Vegetable Kingdom; Together With the Uses of the Most Important Species in Medicine, the Arts, and Rural or Domestic Economy. Longman, Rees, Orme, Brown, Green and Longman.
- The Fossil Flora of Great Britain (with William Hutton) (1831–1837)
- Ladies' Botany or, A familiar introduction to the study of the natural system of botany (1834–37) [2 vols.] London: James Ridgway
- Lindley, John (1838). "Exogens". The Penny Cyclopaedia of the Society for the Diffusion of Useful Knowledge. vol. X Ernesti–Frustum. London: Charles Knight. pp. 120–123.
- Flora Medica (1838)
- Sertum orchidaceum:a wreath of the most beautiful orchidaceous flowers selected by John Lindley. (1838)
- Appendix to the first twenty-three volumes of Edwards's botanical register (1839)
- Lindley, John (1839). "Primary Distribution of the Vegetable Garden". Botanical Register. xxv: 76–81.
- Theory of Horticulture (1840)
- Sketch of the Vegetation of the Swan River Colony (1840)
- The genera and species of orchidaceous plants /by John Lindley. (1830–1840)
- Edwards' botanical register (1829–1847) With James Ridgway. Vol. 15–33.
- Medical and oeconomical botany /by John Lindley (1849)
- "A Catalogue of Coniferous Plants, with their Synonyms" (with George Gordon) (1850) in: The Journal of the Horticultural Society of London, volume 5, p. 199–228.
- Folia Orchidacea (1852)
- Paxton's flower garden by Professor Lindley and Sir Joseph Paxton et al. (1853) Three volumes.
- Descriptive Botany (1858)

=== Taxonomic works ===
- A Natural System of Botany (1830–1836)
  - Lindley, John (1830). An introduction to the natural system of botany: or, A systematic view of the organisation, natural affinities, and geographical distribution, of the whole vegetable kingdom: together with the uses of the most important species in medicine, the arts, and rural or domestic economy (1st ed.). London: Longman.
  - Lindley, John (1836) [1830]. A natural system of botany; or, A systematic view of the organization, natural affinities, and geographical distribution of the whole vegetable kingdom: together with the uses of the most important species in medicine, the arts, and rural or domestic economy (2nd ed.). London: Longman.
- The Vegetable Kingdom (1846–1853)
  - Lindley, John (1846). The Vegetable Kingdom: or, The structure, classification, and uses of plants, illustrated upon the natural system (1st ed.). London: Bradbury.
  - Lindley, John (1847) [1846]. The Vegetable Kingdom: or, The structure, classification, and uses of plants, illustrated upon the natural system (2nd ed.). London: Bradbury & Evans.
  - Lindley, John (1853) [1846]. The Vegetable Kingdom: or, The structure, classification, and uses of plants, illustrated upon the natural system (3rd. ed.). London: Bradbury & Evans.

=== Edited works ===
- In 1841 he co-founded The Gardeners' Chronicle alongside Joseph Paxton, Charles Wentworth Dilke and William Bradbury and became its first editor.
- The Botanical Register 1820–1847

== See also ==
- Lindley system
- Hundred of Lindley

== Bibliography ==
- Stearn, William T. The life, times and achievements of John Lindley., in Stearn (1998)
- Stearn, William T., ed. (1998). John Lindley (1799-1865): gardener, botanist and pioneer orchidologist : Bi-centenary celebration volume. Woodbridge: Antique Collectors Club & Royal Horticultural Society. ISBN 978-1-85149-296-1.
  - Green, Peter S. (November 1999). "William T. Stearn: John Lindley 1799–1865. Gardener-Botanist and Pioneer Orchidologist". Curtis's Botanical Magazine (Review). 16 (4): 301–302. doi:10.1111/1467-8748.00234.
- The Penny Cyclopaedia of the Society for the Diffusion of Useful Knowledge. vol. X Ernesti–Frustum. London: Charles Knight. 1838. (see Penny Cyclopedia)
- Boulger, George Simonds (1893). "Lindley, John" . In Lee, Sidney (ed.). Dictionary of National Biography. Vol. 33. London: Smith, Elder & Co.
- Rines, George Edwin, ed. (1920). "Lindley, John" . Encyclopedia Americana.
- Drayton, Richard. "Lindley, John (1799–1865)". Oxford Dictionary of National Biography (online ed.). Oxford University Press. doi:10.1093/ref:odnb/16674. (Subscription, Wikipedia Library access or UK public library membership required.)
- "Contributions to the Bibliography of John Lindley". Occasional Papers from the RHS Lindley Library. 13. November 2015. ISSN 2043-0477.
- Lucas, A. M. (April 2008). "Disposing of John Lindley's library and herbarium: the offer to Australia". Archives of Natural History. 35 (1): 15–70. doi:10.3366/E0260954108000053.
