= Branches of botany =

Botany is a natural science concerned with the study of plants. The main branches of botany (also referred to as "plant science") are commonly divided into three groups: core topics, applied topics which study the ways in which plants may be used for economic benefit in horticulture, core topics which associate with agriculture and forestry concerned with the study of the fundamental natural phenomena and processes of plant life, the classification and description of plant diversity, and organismic topics which focus on plant groups such as algae, mosses or flowering plants.

== Applied topics ==
- Agronomy – Application of plant science to crop production
- Arboriculture – Culture and propagation of trees
- Astrobotany - The study of plants in space
- Biotechnology – Use of plants to synthesize products
- Dendrology – Study of woody plants, shrubs, trees and lianas
- Economic botany – Study of plants of economic use or value
- Ethnobotany – Plants and people. Use and selection of plants by humans
- Floristics - The study of plants in a specific geographical region.
- Forestry – Forest management and related studies
- Horticulture – cultivation of garden plants
- Marine botany – Study of aquatic plants and algae that live in seawater
- Micropropagation – rapid propagation of plants using cell and tissue culture
- Pharming (genetics) – Genetic engineering of plants to produce pharmaceuticals
- Plant breeding – Breeding of plants with desirable genetic characters
- Plant pathology (Phytopathology) – Plant diseases
- Plant propagation – propagation of plants from seed, bulbs, tubers, cuttings and grafting
- Pomology – Fruit and nuts
- Seed technology - Seed technology is the science dealing with the methods of improving physical and genetical characteristics of seed.

== Core topics ==
- Cytology – cell structure
- Epigenetics – Control of gene expression
- Paleobotany – Study of fossil plants and plant evolution
- Palynology – Pollen and spores
- Plant biochemistry – Chemical processes of primary and secondary metabolism
- Phenology – the timing of germination, flowering and fruiting
- Phytochemistry – Plant secondary chemistry and chemical processes
- Phytogeography – Plant Biogeography, the study of plant distributions
- Phytosociology – Plant communities and interactions
- Plant anatomy – Structure of plant cells and tissues
- Plant ecology – Role and function of plants in the environment
- Plant evolutionary developmental biology – Plant development from an evolutionary perspective
- Plant genetics – Genetic inheritance in plants
- Plant morphology – Structure of plants
- Plant physiology – Life functions of plants
- Plant reproduction – Processes of plant reproduction
- Plant systematics – Classification and naming of plants
- Plant taxonomy – Classification and naming of plants

== Organismal topics ==
=== Groups of organisms — clades, grades and guilds ===
- Agrostology – Poaceae
- Bryology – Bryophytes
- Citrology – Citrus
- Dendrology – trees
- Lichenology – lichens
- Mycology – fungi
- Orchidology – Orchidaceae
- Phycology – algae
- Pteridology – ferns
- Synantherology – Asteraceae

=== Study of chronological dating using plants ===
- Acanthochronology – Cactaceae
- Dendrochronology – Wood
