= Carolus Adrianus Johannes Kreutz =

Dutch orchidologist and taxonomist (born 1954)

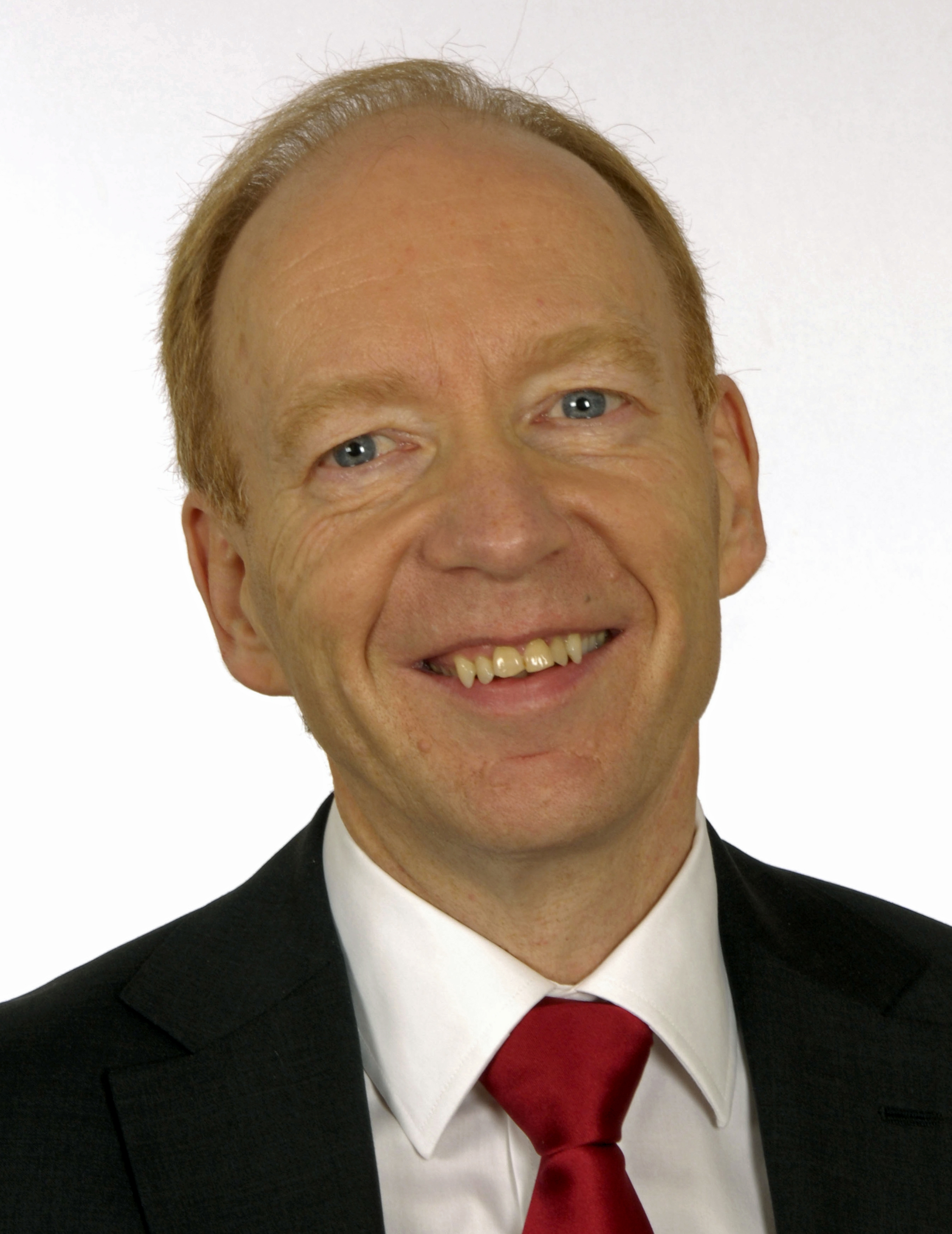
- Carolus Adrianus Johannes Kreutz (2011)
- Born: 1954 (age 71–72)
- Scientific career
- Fields: orchidologist, botanist, taxonomist
- Author abbrev. (botany): Kreutz

Carolus Adrianus Johannes "Karel" Kreutz (born 1954) is a Dutch orchidologist, botanical writer and taxonomist, currently affiliated with the Centre for Biodiversity Naturalis in Leiden, Netherlands. He is regarded as an exceptionally experienced orchidologist, and has published orchid floras of Cyprus, Turkey, Rhodes, Crimea, Netherlands, Belgium and Germany, and is currently preparing a major overview in ten volumes of all orchid taxa in Europe, North Africa and the Middle East, employing modern taxonomy, nomenclature and research techniques.

Kreutz has published over 200 scientific papers, and is the scientific authority for over four hundred plant taxa, predominantly in the Orchidaceae, but also in the genus Orobanche.

== Honours ==
The following orchid species have been named in recognition of Kreutz' work on the Orchidaceae:

- (Orchidaceae) Ophrys kreutzii W.Hahn, R.Wegener & J.Mast
- (Orchidaceae) Ophrys × kreutziana P.Delforge

== Publications ==
- Kreutz, C.A.J. (1987). De verspreiding van de inheemse orchideeën in Nederland. Zutphen : Thieme. ISBN 978-9003901613.
- Kreutz, C.A.J. (1992). Orchideeën in Zuid-Limburg. KNNV. ISBN 978-9050110297.
- Kreutz, C.A.J. (1995). OROBANCHE: Die Sommerwurzarten Europas / The European broomrape species. Meijs Publishers. ISBN 978-9074508056.
- Kreutz, C.A.J. (1998). Die Orchideen der Türkei. Kreutz & Seckel. ISBN 978-90-9011307-4.
- Kreutz, C.A.J. (2002). The Orchids of Rhodes and Karpathos. Reulte & Landgraaf, Netherlands: Seckel & Kreutz. ISBN 90-805149-2-6.
- Kreutz, C.A.J. (2004). Kompendium der Europäischen Orchideen / Catalogue of European Orchids. Kreutz Publishers, Landgraaf. ISBN 978-90-806626-4-3.
- Kreutz, C.A.J. (2004). Die Orchideen von Zypern / The Orchids of Cyprus. ISBN 978-9080662636.
