= Art Chadwick =

American orchid grower (born 1962)

Arthur Everett Chadwick
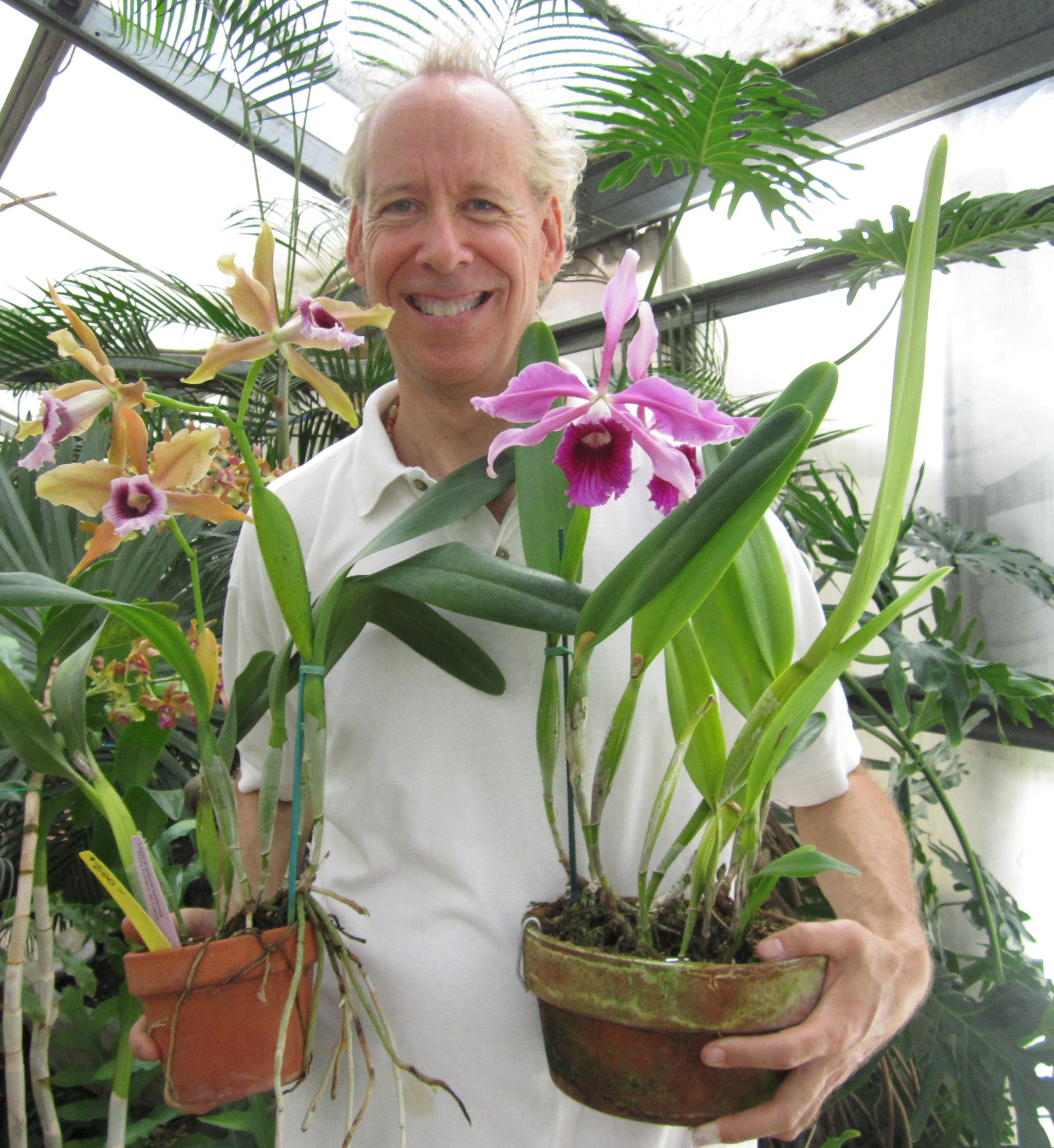
- Born: 1962 (age 62–63); Hockessin, Delaware, U.S.
- Other names: Art Chadwick
- Education: BS in electrical engineering, MBA
- Known for: Contributions to orchid culture and owner of an orchid business.
- Awards: Various awards for his orchids by the American Orchid Society including FCC, AM/AOS, and much more.
- Scientific career
- Fields: Orchid biology, botany

Arthur E. Chadwick is an American orchid grower and entrepreneur. He founded Chadwick & Son Orchids Inc in 1989 with his father, A. A. Chadwick, who has been growing orchids since 1943. Chadwicks has 11 greenhouses in Powhatan County, Virginia and two retail stores in Richmond. The company has been featured in Southern Living magazine, The New York Times, O Magazine, CBS Sunday Morning, and the Washington Post.

== Early life ==
=== Childhood and family ===
Chadwick grew up in Wilmington, Delaware learning about orchids from his father, A. A. Chadwick who nurtured two redwood greenhouses full of rare cattleyas. His mother, Anne, was an amateur watercolor artist and designed the logo for the orchid company.

=== Education ===
Chadwick holds a BS in electrical engineering from North Carolina State and a master's in business from James Madison. This education was helpful in both the design of the greenhouses and the everyday operation of the company.

== Agriculture work ==
With his father, Chadwick co-authored The Classic Cattleyas which is widely considered to be the definitive book on the large-flowered Cattleya species (corsage orchids). Martha Stewart favorably reviewed the book and both Chadwicks appeared on her television show. Chadwick has named Cattleya hybrids after the wives of the last six U.S. Presidents and has personally presented the flowers to most of the honored recipients.

He has spoken at two World Orchid Conferences - France 2005, Ecuador 2017 and his monthly orchid advice column appeared nationwide in newspapers for 20 years. Chadwick regularly speaks to horticulture groups throughout the United States and, most recently, in England.
