= Margaret A. Dix =

British botanist (1939–2025)

Margaret Ann Dix
- Dix in 2010
- Born: Margaret Ann Jones; 19 May 1939; Jersey
- Died: 2 June 2025 (aged 86); Silver Spring, Maryland, U.S.
- Resting place: Parklawn Memorial Park
- Education: University of London; Mount Holyoke College; Harvard University
- Known for: Guatemalan orchids
- Scientific career
- Fields: Botany; Orchidology; Taxonomy
- Workplaces: Universidad del Valle de Guatemala
- Doctoral advisor: E. O. Wilson
- Author abbrev. (botany): M.A.Dix

Margaret Ann Dix (19 May 1939 – 2 June 2025) was a British-born Guatemalan botanist and taxonomist. In 1972, she founded the Center for Environmental Studies and Biodiversity (Centro de Estudios Amientales y de Bioversidad) at the Universidad del Valle de Guatemala in Guatemala City. Her research focused on Guatemalan orchids and orchid taxonomy, as well as plant behavior and limnology.

== Biography ==
Born Margaret Ann Jones on Jersey in the Channel Islands on 19 May 1939, she grew up on a Jersey dairy farm. She received her bachelor's degree in biology from the University of London in 1962 and her masters in zoology from Mount Holyoke College in Massachusetts in 1964. From 1964 to 1968, she studied entomology, ecology and animal behaviour at Harvard University under the eminent scientist E. O. Wilson.

While working on her doctoral degree at Harvard, she was required to spend two years abroad. At the end of 1972, together with her American husband, biologist Michael W. Dix, she decided to go to Guatemala where there was an opportunity to found a biology department at the Universidad del Valle de Guatemala. In 1977, she was appointed director of the department, a post she maintained until 2002. During retirement, she continued to participate in biological and environmental research at the university and continued to be active in the field. As of 2015, she was part of a group of scientists studying pollution in Lake Atitlán, having developed a research interest in limnology.

Dix was a recognized taxonomist, especially in the area of Guatemalan orchids. Her and her husband's Orchids of Guatemala: A Revised Annotated Checklist (2000), based on their extensive field collections, covers 734 taxa, including 207 new records.

Dix died on 2 June 2025, at the age of 86. She was interred at Parklawn Memorial Park in Rockville, Maryland. She was survived by her husband and their three children.

== Selected publications ==
The standard author abbreviation M.A.Dix is used to indicate this person as the author when citing a botanical name.

=== Journal articles ===
- Michael W. Dix, Margaret A. Dix. 2007. Integrated approaches to orchid conservation in Guatemala: past, present and future, opportunities and challenges. Lankesteriana 7 (1–2): 266–268
- Margaret A. Dix, Michael W. Dix. 2006. Diversity, distribution, ecology and economic importance of Guatemalan orchids, pp. 187–198 in E. Cano (ed.) Biodiversidad de Guatemala. Volumen 1. Universidad del Valle
- Michael W. Dix, Margaret A. Dix. 2003. Rhynchostele bictoniensis: cambios en abundancia y éxito de polinización entre 1992 y 2002. Lankesteriana 3 (7 ): 98
- R. Wer, Margaret A. Dix, L. Pérez, M.R. Álvarez, R. Arrivillaga. 2003. Impacto de Hydrilla verticillata. Fase 1. Datos biológicos e indicadores básicos de ictiofauna en el lago de Izabal. Informe final Proyecto AGROCYT
- Margaret A. Dix, Michael W. Dix. 2003. Polinización de orquídeas en Guatemala: los polinizadores, el estado natural de sus poblaciones y las implicaciones para las especies polinizadas. Lankesteriana 3 (7 ): 97
- Michael W. Dix, Margaret A. Dix, M. Maldonado. 2001. Conservation of orchids in Guatemala. Memoria 2º Seminario Mesoamericano de Orquidología y Conservación. p. 17
- M.L. Maldonado, M.A. Dix, M.W. Dix, M. Palmieri, L. Castellanos. 2001. Relaciones genéticas e hibridación natural entre especies de Lycaste, Sección Deciduosae, sub-sección Xanthantae (Orch.) en Guatemala. Memoria Segundo Seminario Mesoamericana de Orquídeología. p. 26.
- Margaret A. Dix, K. Herrera, J.F. Pérez, A.C. Bailey, R. Girón, I. de la Roca, K. Pierola. 1999. El impacto del huracán Mitch sobre la integridad ecológica del lago de Izabal y sus afluentes. Mesoamericana 4 (3): 114

=== Books ===
- Dix, Michael W.; Dix, Margaret A. (2000). Orchids of Guatemala: a revised annotated checklist. Monographs in systematic botany. Vol. 78. Missouri Botanical Garden Press. ISBN 0915279665.
- Dix, Michael W.; Dix, Margaret A. (1989). Biodiversidad de las áreas protegidas propuestas en El Petén (in Spanish). Universidad del Valle de Guatemala.
