= Bletchingley Castle =

- Surrey, England

Site information
- Type: keep (tower), ringwork and bailey
- Owner: Various
- Open to the public: No (access road and path at foot to south are rights of way thus only to be used as such)
- Condition: Ruined

Location
- Shown within Surrey
- Coordinates: 51.2384°N 0.1076°W
- Grid reference: grid reference TQ322505
- Height: 2m

Site history
- Materials: unknown stone

Bletchingley Castle is a ruined castle and set of earthworks partly occupied by three buildings. The Scheduled Ancient Monument is directly beside the Greensand Way below it to the south in the village of Bletchingley in Surrey. The site's tower standing from c.1170 to 1264 had a panorama from one of the narrower parts of the Greensand Ridge, which runs from mid-Kent to south-west Surrey.

== History ==
Late in the 12th century a rectangular tower was built on an earlier enclosure of earthworks by Richard Fitz Gilbert, founder of the de Clare family. In 1170 on the way to Canterbury the four knights responsible for assassinating Thomas Becket stopped here. Such a tower would have provided a complete look-out from the Greensand Ridge, which itself provided a relatively reliably dry but not foot or hoof-wearing east–west route.

In the 1260s the castle was besieged and taken by royal forces. The tower was destroyed.

The remains of the masonry defences point to mid-12th-century work and indicate a masonry castle of the time of King Stephen, a period during which many such strongholds were erected. The Surrey branch of the medieval noble Clare family lived in the village and sided with the barons during the disputes with the Crown in the 13th century, and in the wars of 1263–4 it was, so far as is recorded, for the first and only time was the scene of military operations. Simon de Montfort, accompanied by Gilbert de Clare, 7th Earl of Gloucester, marched by here on his way to attack the king's army on the coast. Although the barons won a victory at Lewes, the Royalists having seized de Clare's family Tonbridge Castle pounced upon his London force who had been driven from the field and were retreating the way they had come, and are said to have taken and dismantled Blechingley Castle, an operation which might have been disastrous for the barons had they been beaten at Lewes. H. E. Malden states with citations: "it is probable, however, that the castle was not totally destroyed by this comparatively small force, but that, having once been dismantled, it fell into neglect and became gradually ruined. John Aubrey, writing about 1697, mentions 'one piece of wall of 5 foot thick' as still remaining. Manning, in the early 19th century, says the foundations were still visible."

=== Owners ===
The land on which the castle had stood became separated from the manor (to the north), and appears to have been held in the 16th century by a Cholmeley, who also held land called Unwins (a name seen in certain later place names in the parish), which lay close by the site below the hill. According to Manning the site afterwards belonged to a Drake family, who assumed the name of Brockman in the late 18th century. In 1793 James Drake Brockman sold it to John Kenrick, whose brothers, Matthew and Jarvis, afterwards held in turn. It belonged to this family when Edward Wedlake Brayley (Note: Brayley, Edward Wedlake History of Surrey (5 vols., 1841–1848)) wrote about the county. After Mr. James Norris, who built Castle Hill about 1860 it belonged to a Mr. Partridge.

The castle as such became part of the grounds of the house Castle Hill — it was home of Mr. A. P. Brandt in 1911.

== Ruins ==
The site has been quite overgrown for many years but vegetation does not cover part of the minority of materials that remain, as walls, doorways and arches.

Specifically, one outer ditch has been partially infilled and the site has been indented by foundation-laying, associated water pipes, drain, electricity cable and access road for the 19th century construction of the Castle Hill home and now separately owned Stable House and Garden Cottage near the centre of the large mound, its ringwork and bailey (fortification) at Bletchingley survives well and "large areas, especially within the ringwork, lie apparently undisturbed". The survival of part of a Norman domestic building is a rarity and one which adds to the castle's broad diversity of features. The potential of the monument for the recovery of further evidence of the date and manner of occupation of the castle is high. As a result of the small-scale excavations, archaeological documentation has been compiled.

An extract from the schedule monument determination is:

The monument includes a castle of the Norman period which comprises an inner near-circular enclosure, or ringwork, and an outer enclosure, or bailey. The ringwork is defined by a massive ditch on the northern and eastern sides which still survives to a depth of over 6m. On the inner edge is an earthen bank or rampart which stands to between 1.4 and 2.4m above the level of the land in the interior. The ditch is spanned on the NE side by a causeway 3m wide which marks the original access route into the inner part of the castle. The bank and ditch of the ringwork gives way on the south side to the steep natural slope of the hill, while on the western side it has been partially levelled to make room for a large Victorian house. The main building within the ringwork was a house some 24m square. Its undercroft survives in places to a height of 2.5m beneath rubble from the house's collapse. The house had living quarters on the first floor, to which access was gained via stairs at the NW and SE corners. The house has been partially excavated, but the north-eastern half remains uninvestigated. The outer defences comprise a bank and ditch which surround the ringwork on all sides except the south, although they have been levelled on the western side. To the north and east the bank survives to a maximum height of 1.6m and averages 7m across. Between the inner and outer defences was the bailey, where ancillary buildings such as stables and storage huts were sited.

Towards the north-west is a small mound which may mark the site of a barbican.

== Notes and references ==
Notes
