= Robert Comber =

English cricketer

Robert Harrison Comber (c. 1816 – 28 May 1858) was an English cricketer who played for Surrey. He was born in Mitcham and died in Nottingham; his precise date of birth is unknown.

Comber made a single first-class appearance, in 1851, against Sussex. Batting as a tailender, he scored 3 runs in the first innings in which he batted and 17 in the second.
