= Mick Comber =

Australian rules footballer, born 1903

Personal information
- Full name: Laurence Michael Comber
- Born: 17 April 1903; Korumburra, Victoria
- Died: 9 January 1975 (aged 71); Caulfield South, Victoria
- Original team: Port Melbourne

Playing career^{1}
| Years | Club | Games (Goals) |
| 1929 | Melbourne | 1 (1) |
- ^{1} Playing statistics correct to the end of 1929.

Laurence Michael Comber (17 April 1903 – 9 January 1975) was an Australian rules footballer who played with Melbourne in the Victorian Football League (VFL).

After three games with Port Melbourne in 1927, Comber made his solitary senior VFL appearance for Melbourne in the final game of the 1929 season. He played in Melbourne's seconds premiership team two years later.
