= Joseph Comber =

English cricketer

Personal information
- Full name: Joseph Thomas Henry Comber
- Born: 26 February 1911
- Died: 3 May 1976 (aged 65); Chelsea, London
- Batting: Right-handed
- Role: Wicket-keeper
- Source: Cricinfo, 18 April 2017

Joseph Thomas Henry Comber (26 February 1911 – 3 May 1976) was an English cricketer. He played 57 first-class matches between 1931 and 1948, including 35 for Cambridge University Cricket Club.

Comber was born in 1911, the adopted son of Henry Gordan Comber. His father was a teaching fellow at Pembroke College, Cambridge who was the treasurer of a number of Cambridge organisations and became the college bursar in 1933. Like his father, Joseph was educated at Marlborough College, where he spent four years in the cricket XI, captaining the side in his final year, before going up to Pembroke in 1930. He played cricket at university, winning his first Blue as a Freshman in the 1931 University Match. He played as a wicket-keeper against Oxford in the 1932 and 1933 University Matches and made a total of 35 appearances for the Cambridge side. Despite his skills as a tail-end batsman, Comber's non-linear playing style resulted in inconsistent run accumulation in first-class cricket. He was selected to play for the Gentlemen against the Players in 1932 and 1933.

After leaving Cambridge, Comber worked as a chartered accountant, living in London before the Second World War. He played cricket for the Marylebone Cricket Club (MCC) and Free Foresters each year between 1934 and 1937, making a total of 16 first-class appearances for the two sides during the period before the war. He had been a member of the Officer Training Corps at school and in May 1939 was commissioned as a second Lieutenant n the Royal Artillery, serving throughout the war.

After the war Comber played a further four first-class appearances, three for MCC and one for a side organised by HDG Leveson-Gower against the touring Indian side in 1946. He died at Chelsea in 1976 aged 65.
