= Sapang =

Settlement in Malaysia

Coordinates: 4°38′N 118°20′E

Sapang, Sabah, is 4° 37' 58" north of the equator and 118° 19' 58" east of the prime meridian.
