= James Boughtwood Comber =

British botanist

James ('Jim') Boughtwood Comber (1929 – 7 September 2005) was born at Garlieston, Scotland, into a famous horticultural family. His father was the noted collector and lily breeder Harold Comber ALS, while his grandfather, James Comber VMH was Head Gardener at Nymans. His brother Richard gained a PhD in plant biochemistry. from Southampton University in 1955. His sister, Mary Comber-Miles, became the resident botanical artist at the University of British Columbia.

== Career ==
On leaving school, Comber worked briefly for the seed company of Sutton & Son at Reading before beginning an apprenticeship at the Royal Botanic Gardens Kew in 1951. National Service interrupted his training, but his posting to Singapore was to inspire his 35-year career in South East Asia and interest in its flora. After National Service, Comber returned to Kew, completing his course in 1955. Later that year he was given leave to join Anglo-Indonesian Plantations (AIP) in Java. After resuming studies at degree level, he graduated in 1960, whereupon he accepted the post of Assistant Manager with AIP at the Sapang rubber plantation in Sabah (then British North Borneo but part of Malaysia from 1963), later becoming Manager, and spending much of his leisure time collecting and photographing orchids.

During this time, Comber formed a close and philanthropic association with the native population, taking much interest in their culture and learning local languages. However, much of this period coincided with the Indonesia–Malaysia confrontation over the sovereignty of the region, and Comber's activities were to arouse the suspicions of the authorities as many of his workforce had come from Indonesia. He was declared persona non grata. Comber eventually moved in 1971 to the post of agronomist with Ciba-Geigy near Medan in Sumatra, and later Thailand, during which time he was able to further his knowledge of the hundreds of orchid species.

Comber was to write three books, and numerous articles for orchid journals, about the orchids of South-east Asia (see 'Works'), describing well over 1000 species, all illustrated with photographs he had taken; the publication by the RBG Kew of one of these tomes, The Orchids of Java, he personally funded. He inevitably discovered many new species, and two are named in his honour: Sarcoglyphis comberi J. J. Wood and Bulbophyllum comberi J. J. Vermeulen.

Comber retired in 1991, returning to the UK and settling in Southampton.

== Death ==
James Comber died suddenly at his home in Southampton on 7 September 2005 following a knee operation.

== Personal life ==
Comber married Riam Tiekseeboon shortly before his retirement; they had two children, Elizabeth and John.

== Works ==
- Comber, J. B. (1981). Wayside Orchids of South-east Asia. Heinemann-Asia, Kuala-Lumpur.
- Comber, J. B. (1990). Orchids of Java. RBG Kew.
- Comber, J. B. (2001). Orchids of Sumatra. RBG Kew / Natural History Publications, Kota Kinabalu.

== Notes ==
See also note by Phillip Cribb in Kew Gardens Orchid Research Newsletter No.47, January 2006
