= Combera =

Scientific classification
- Kingdom: Plantae
- Clade: Tracheophytes
- Clade: Angiosperms
- Clade: Eudicots
- Clade: Asterids
- Order: Solanales
- Family: Solanaceae
- Genus: Combera; Sandwith

Genus of flowering plants

Combera is a genus of flowering plants belonging to the family Solanaceae.

Its native range is Southern South America.

Species:

- Combera minima Sandwith
- Combera paradoxa Sandwith
