= Benjamin Samuel Williams =

English orchidologist and nurseryman in London (1824–1890)

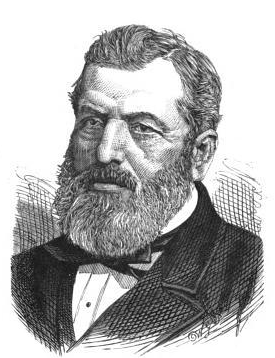
- Engraved portrait of Williams, published with his obituary in Vol. IX of The Orchid Album
- Born: March 2, 1822; England
- Died: June 24, 1890 (aged 68); London, England
- Resting place: Highgate Cemetery
- Known for: The Orchid Grower's Manual; Select Orchidaceous Plants; The Orchid Album
- Scientific career
- Fields: Botany, Orchidology, Horticulture
- Workplaces: Seven Sisters Road Nursery; Victoria and Paradise Nurseries
- Author abbrev. (botany): B.S.Williams

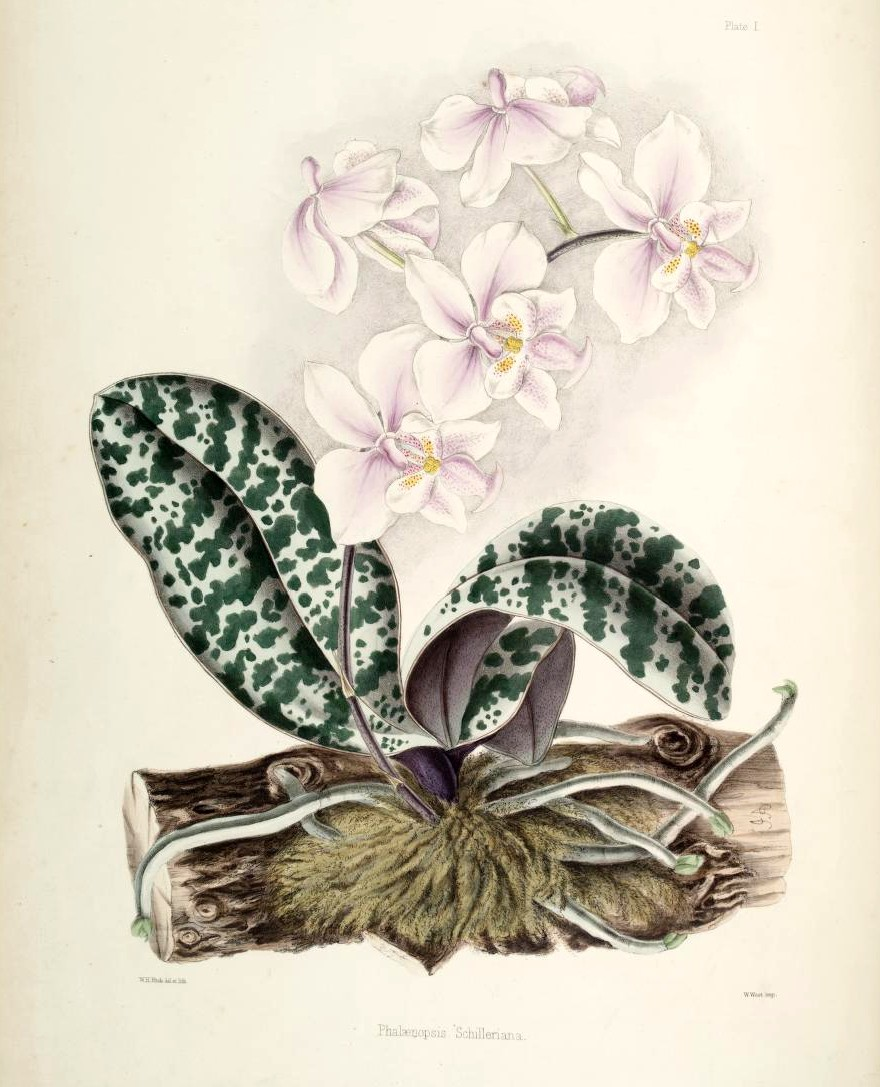
Phalaenopsis schilleriana Select Orchidaceous Plants

Benjamin Samuel Williams (2 March 1822 – 24 June 1890), English orchidologist and nurseryman in London, known mainly for his horticultural notes on orchids in publications such as The Orchid Grower's Manual (London 1852, 7th ed. 1894), Select Orchidaceous Plants (London 1862 onwards) and The Orchid Album (London 1882–97).

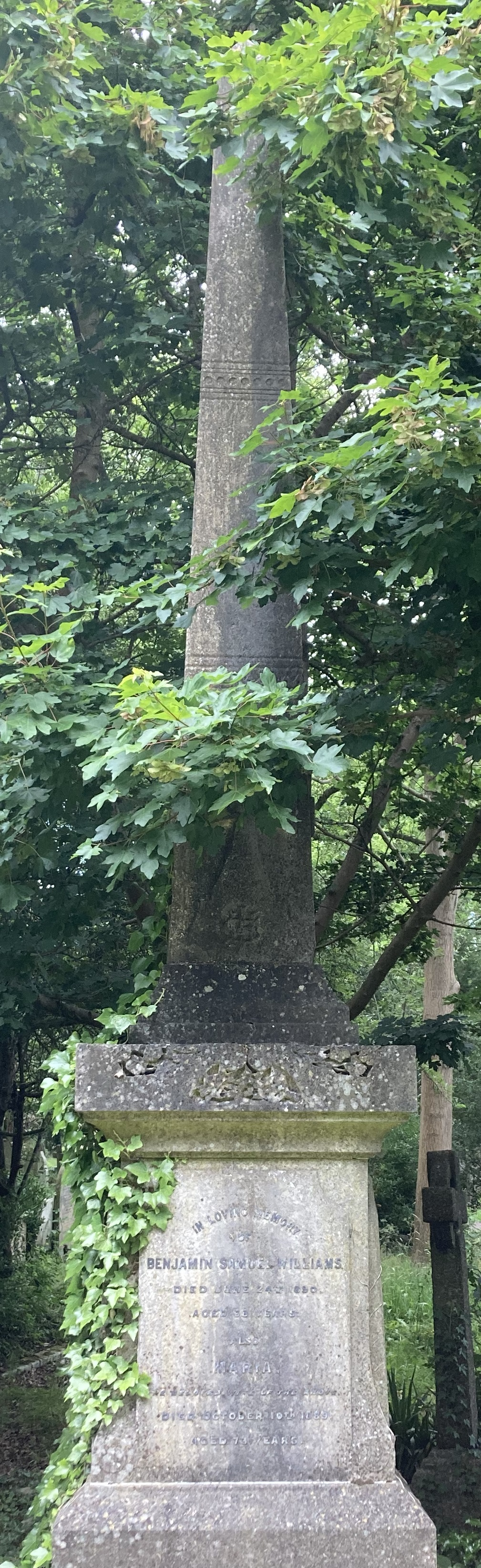
Grave of Benjamin Samuel Williams in Highgate Cemetery

== Biography ==
Williams' father James was gardener to Robert Warner, the botanist, at Hoddesdon, and Benjamin began working under his father at the age of fourteen. He first gained prominence as an orchid grower when he was hired by the orchid collector C. B. Warner, whose orchids soon began winning prizes at top orchid shows. Williams was a business partner of Robert Parker's in a nursery at Seven Sisters Road in Holloway between 1854 and 1861, and later moved to the nearby Victoria and Paradise Nurseries.

He is buried on the eastern side of Highgate Cemetery.

This botanist is denoted by the author abbreviation B.S.Williams when citing a botanical name.
