= Charles Comber =

Australian rules footballer

Personal information
- Full name: Charles Fillery Comber
- Born: 26 December 1891; Burwood, Victoria
- Died: 4 February 1966 (aged 74); Caulfield, Victoria
- Original team: Blackburn

Playing career^{1}
Years	Club	Games (Goals)
1915	Essendon	1 (0)
- ^{1} Playing statistics correct to the end of 1915.

Charles Fillery Comber (26 December 1891 – 4 February 1966) was an Australian rules footballer who played with Essendon in the Victorian Football League (VFL).
