= Orchidology =

Scientific study of orchids

The Orchid World, an illustrated journal devoted to orchidology by Gurney Wilson.

Orchidology is the scientific study of orchids. It is an organismal-level branch of botany.

== See also ==
- List of orchidologists
