= Carver (surname) =

Carver is a surname which came to England after the Norman Conquest. The name came from the Norman French Caruier, which either derived from the Gallo-Roman Carrucarius, or from the Gaulish word Carrum meaning 'wagon' or 'cart'. Notable people with the surname include:

- Bob Carver, American physicist and audio equipment designer
- Caroline Carver (actress) (born 1976), English actress
- Caroline Carver (author) (born 1959), thriller writer
- Catharine Carver (1921–1997), American-British publisher's editor
- Dante Carver (born 1977), American actor
- Doris Carver, American computer scientist
- Frank G. Carver (1928–2017), biblical Greek scholar and translator of the New American Standard Bible
- George Carver (academic) (1888–1949), American professor of English and author
- George Carver (cricketer) (1879–1912), English cricketer
- George Washington Carver (1864–1943), American botanist and inventor
- James Carver, British politician
- Jeffrey Carver (1949–2026), American science fiction author
- Jesse Carver (1911–2003), English football player and manager
- John Carver (footballer) (born 1965), English football coach
- John Carver (Mayflower Pilgrim) (c. 1576–1621), first governor of Plymouth Colony (Massachusetts)
- Jonathan Carver (1710–1780), American explorer
- Karl Carver (born 1996), British cricketer
- Lisa Crystal Carver (born 1968), writer and artist
- Lynne Carver (1916–1955), American actress
- Martin Carver (born 1941), English archaeologist
- Mary Carver (1924–2013), American actress
- Mel Carver (born 1959), American football player
- Michael Carver, Baron Carver (1915–2001), British soldier and Chief of the General Staff
- Randall Carver (born 1946), American actor
- Raymond Carver (1938–1988), American short story writer and poet
- Richard Carver (architect)
- Robert Carver (composer), Scottish composer
- Robert Carver (painter) (c. 1730–1791), Irish painter
- Roy James Carver (1909–1981), American philanthropist and businessman
- Russell Carver (1934–2026), British rower
- Steve Carver (1945–2021), American film director, producer, and photographer
- Terrell Carver (born 1946), American political theorist
- Thomas Nixon Carver (1865–1961), American economist
- Todd Carver, American politician
- Walter Buckingham Carver (1879–1961), American mathematician and educator

== Fictional characters ==
- Antimony Carver, the protagonist of the 2005 webcomic Gunnerkrigg Court
- Elliot Carver, the villain in the James Bond film Tomorrow Never Dies
- Ellis Carver, a police officer in HBO drama The Wire
- Jack Carver, protagonist in the first-person shooter game Far Cry
- Jim Carver, a police officer in long-running British police drama The Bill
- Noah Carver, Blue Ranger of Power Rangers Megaforce & Super Megaforce.
- Paris Carver, wife to the villain in the James Bond film Tomorrow Never Dies
- Rex Carver, British private eye in books by Victor Canning
- Ron Carver, a fictional ADA appearing in Law & Order: Criminal Intent
- Rosie Carver, a character in the James Bond film Live and Let Die
- Zeus Carver, a black activist and John McClane's partner in the film Die Hard with a Vengeance
