= George Whatford =

English cricketer

Personal information
- Full name: George Lumley Whatford
- Born: 20 July 1878; Eastbourne, Sussex, England
- Died: 22 November 1915 (aged 37); Ctesiphon, Ottoman Iraq, Ottoman Empire
- Batting: Unknown

Domestic team information
- Years: Team
- 1904: Sussex

Career statistics
Competition	First-class
Matches	2
Runs scored	21
Batting average	10.50
100s/50s	–/–
Top score	13
Balls bowled	–
Wickets	–
Bowling average	–
5 wickets in innings	–
10 wickets in match	–
Best bowling	–
Catches/stumpings	–/–
- Source: Cricinfo, 26 January 2012

George Lumley Whatford (20 July 1878 – 22 November 1915) was an English cricketer. Whatford's batting style is unknown. He was also a British and Indian Army officer. The son of Jack Henry Whatford and Emily Rose Whatford, he was born at Eastbourne, Sussex, and educated at Harrow School.

By 1900, Whatford was serving in the British Army as a second lieutenant in the South Staffordshire Regiment. He was still serving in the same regiment with the same rank in February 1902, when he transferred to the Indian Staff Corps in the British Indian Army. The following year he was serving in the 6 Madras Infantry, where he was promoted to lieutenant in that year. In 1904, Whatford made his first-class debut in cricket for Sussex against Somerset at the Recreation Ground, Bath, in the 1904 County Championship, though in a match affected by the elements, Whatford wasn't required to bat. He made a second first-class appearance in that same season against Gloucestershire at the Ashley Down Ground, Bristol. Whatford scored 8 runs in Sussex's first-innings, before he was dismissed by Henry Huggins, while in their second-innings he was run out for 13 runs.

By 1909, he was serving in the British Raj with the 66th Punjabis. It was in this year that he was promoted to the rank of captain. His service continued in to World War I, during which he was killed in action in the Mesopotamian campaign at the Battle of Ctesiphon on 22 November 1915. Prior to his death he was due to be promoted to the rank of Major. No known grave exists for Whatford, though his name is commemorated on The Basra Memorial. His brother, Stuart Whatford, also fought and was killed in the war.
