= Twerton Park =

Football stadium in Bath, England

Coordinates: 51.3788°N 2.3950°W

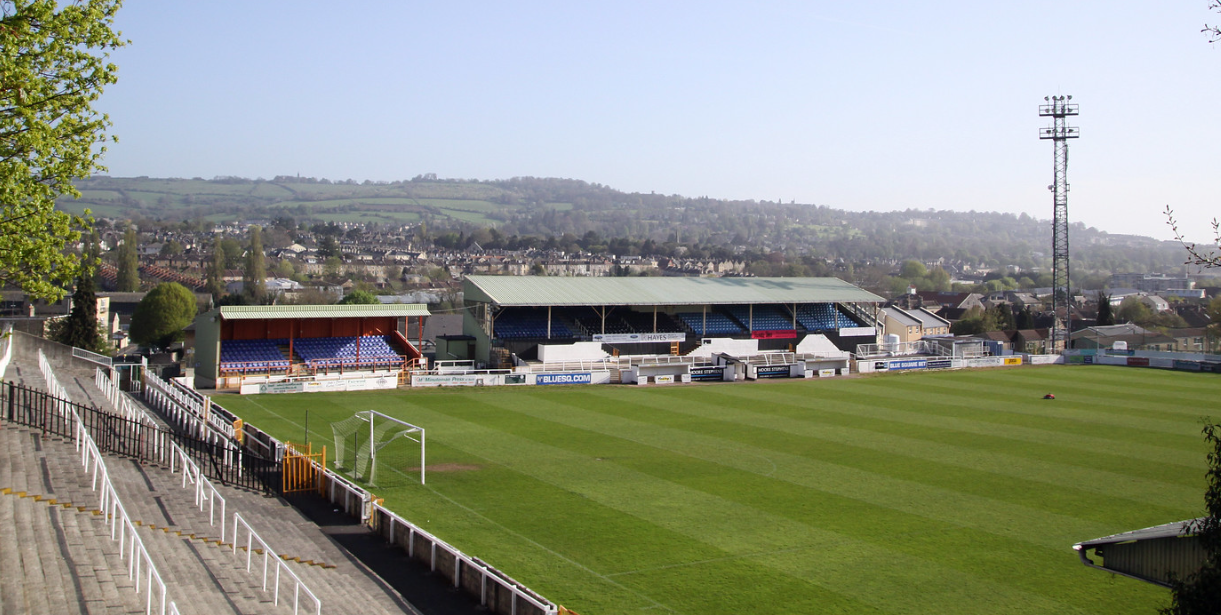
- Interactive map of Twerton Park
- Location: Dominion Road; Twerton; Bath; Somerset; England
- Owner: Bath City
- Operator: Bath City
- Capacity: 8,840 (1,006 seated)
- Surface: Grass
- Record attendance: 18,020 (Bath City – Brighton, 9 January 1960)
- Field size: 101 x 69 meters (110.4 yd x 75.5 yd)
- Public transit: Oldfield Park (1 mi); Bath Spa (2 mi)

Construction
- Built: 1932
- Opened: 26 June 1909
- Renovated: 1932, 1934, 1935, 1946, 1949, 1967, 1986, 1987, 1989, 1990

Tenants
- Bath City (1932–present); Bath City women (2022–present); Bristol Rovers (1986–1996); Team Bath (1999–2009); Bristol City Women (2020–2021)

Website
- bathcityfc.com

Twerton Park is a football stadium in the Twerton suburb of Bath, England. It has a physical capacity of 8,840, containing 1,006 seats. It is currently the home of Bath City F.C., who have played there since 1932. From 1986 to 1996, Bristol Rovers F.C. played at the ground following their departure from Eastville in Bristol. In 2020, the ground also became the home stadium for Bristol City Women.

The stadium has four stands; the Bath End, the Grandstand, The Popular Side, and the Bristol End. The ground once had a capacity up to 20,000, with the record attendance of 18,020 was set between Bath City and Brighton & Hove Albion in the FA Cup third round in 1960. Though the site opened in 1909, the stadium was not constructed until 1932, with The Grandstand being the first of the four stands to be constructed. The stadium is 2.5 km (1.6 miles) from the city centre.

The two bars within the stadium are named after former players: Charlies' (Charlie Fleming), and Randall's (Paul Randall). Twerton Park has undergone several expansions throughout its history, though the decades in which it saw the most development were the 1930s, 1940s, 1960s and the 1980s—including the addition of the family stand, west of The Grandstand.

== History ==
=== Innox Park (1909–1932) ===
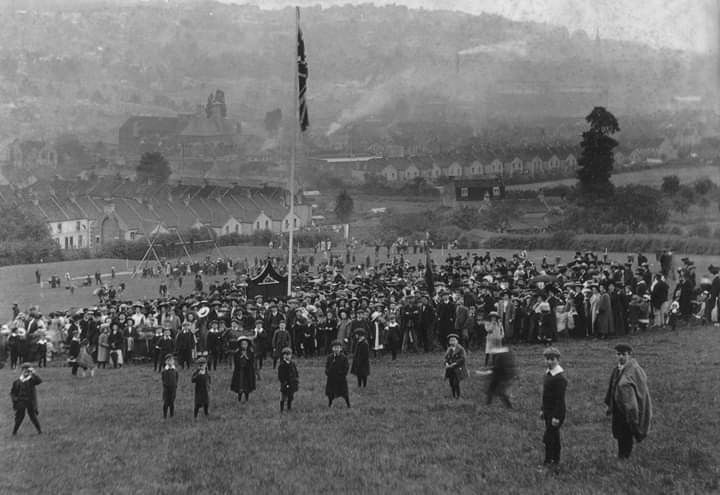
Opening of Innox Park, 1909.

Before any sports ground was established, the Park was opened on 26 June 1909 as Innox Park on land that had been donated by Thomas Carr, merely a field as a source for recreational activity. The opening ceremony involved a parade of scholars, the singing of hymns and a speech by the chairman of the parish council. Innox Park was named the “Cities fourth recreation ground.” The declaration was declared by Mr Hope, who stated; it was not usual that such a duty fell on the shoulders of a working man, but it was fitting that he should be expected to do so on behalf of the working industrial community within the city.

=== The opening of Twerton Park (1932) ===
Bath City F.C. moved to Twerton Park in 1932. The property was bought by Messers C Seargant at a sale held at the Full Moon pub in Twerton. However there was still a "mountain of work to do on the site." Twerton Park, at the time, was not a football stadium or even a football ground, there was no cover of any kind. It was a “flattish grassy area”, with a long steep slope leading up to Innox Park behind. Within a few weeks, Bath City took plunge with regard to the stand and placed a contract for a one thousand seater. It would cost in the region of £320. The local press called for a new name of the ground, Avondale Park, South Ewood, (a tribute to Bath City manager, Ted Davis) Mortimer Park, Davis Park, West view park, and Avon Park were some of the suggested names.

Chairman Reg Coles officially ordered the new steel structure with a galvanized roof and glazed ends. The club supporters decided to temporarily spruce up an outbuilding from an orchard nearby to be used as dressing rooms and the club room, with six weeks to go before the first official game at the stadium there was no stand, no dressing rooms and no entrances. A few weeks later, plans were drawn up and footings dug, with the foundations weighing fifty tons and costing the club £100 each. By the end of May, the supporters had laid a substantial area of turf. From 31 May – 2 “1932, the “Great Supporters Carnival” took place on the site. During which, the Twerton community laid out flags and bunting the length of Twerton High Street to “celebrate the return of football”. There was the usual funfair; a boxing exhibition, games for children and adults – Fancy dress, skittles, guess the weight of the pig. In addition, a motor-cycle gymkhana. The first ever game at Twerton Park was played against Bristol Rovers Reserves in the Southern League on the 27 August 1932, in front of a crowd of 2,936, in which Bath won 2–0.

=== A stadium worthy of the West (1932–1967) ===
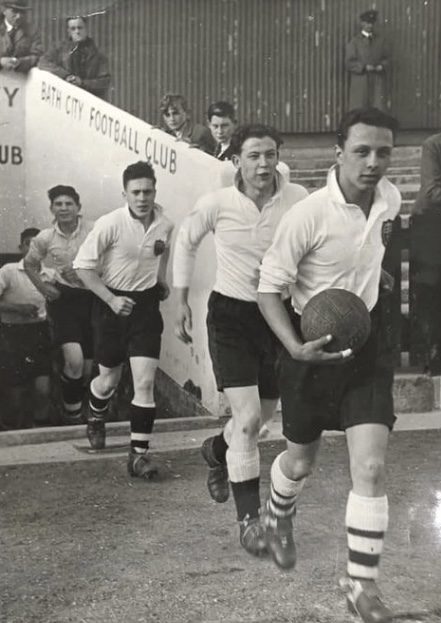
Bath City players stepping out onto Twerton Park in the 1930s

On 25 November 1934, Bath City would play Charlton Athletic, with 600 tickets being sold in two days as work continued to bring the ground up to scratch for the game. A new exit was made from the car park and crush barriers were put in place all along the bank in front of the turnstiles. Half an hour before kick off there were over 5000 in the ground. The official attendance was 9,750, the record gate at the time. Roofing was added to The Popular Side in 1935, with the chairman, Mortimer believing it was a necessity to provide supporters with shelter during bad weather. Aldershot had a "very fine stand" and the price of it was one which appealed to the club's management team, A stand similar would be erected though about half the size. The same year, the club carried on building dressings rooms under the stand, to replace the ones created during the building of the ground from outbuildings.

On 23 April 1937, 11,000 spectators watched the Coronation Cup final between Arsenal and Portsmouth, with Arsenal winning the match 2–0. 500 cars were said to be parked within the car park just outside of the ground. The mayor at the time stated that "there are no more welcome visitors to the city of Bath than the teams of Portsmouth and Arsenal." In April 1941, the city was targeted with bombing raids. Twerton was badly hit, with half The Popular Side being destroyed, and much of the congregated fence blown away, as well as structural damage to the grandstand, the season was voided, with much of the city "razed to the ground." In 1942, The Bath End, was still yet to have any sought of backdrop, with wingers reporting they had the illusion of "dropping of the ends of the earth" with the steep hill behind it when playing on that side, and so chairman Mr Mortimer said it would be the first to be terraced.

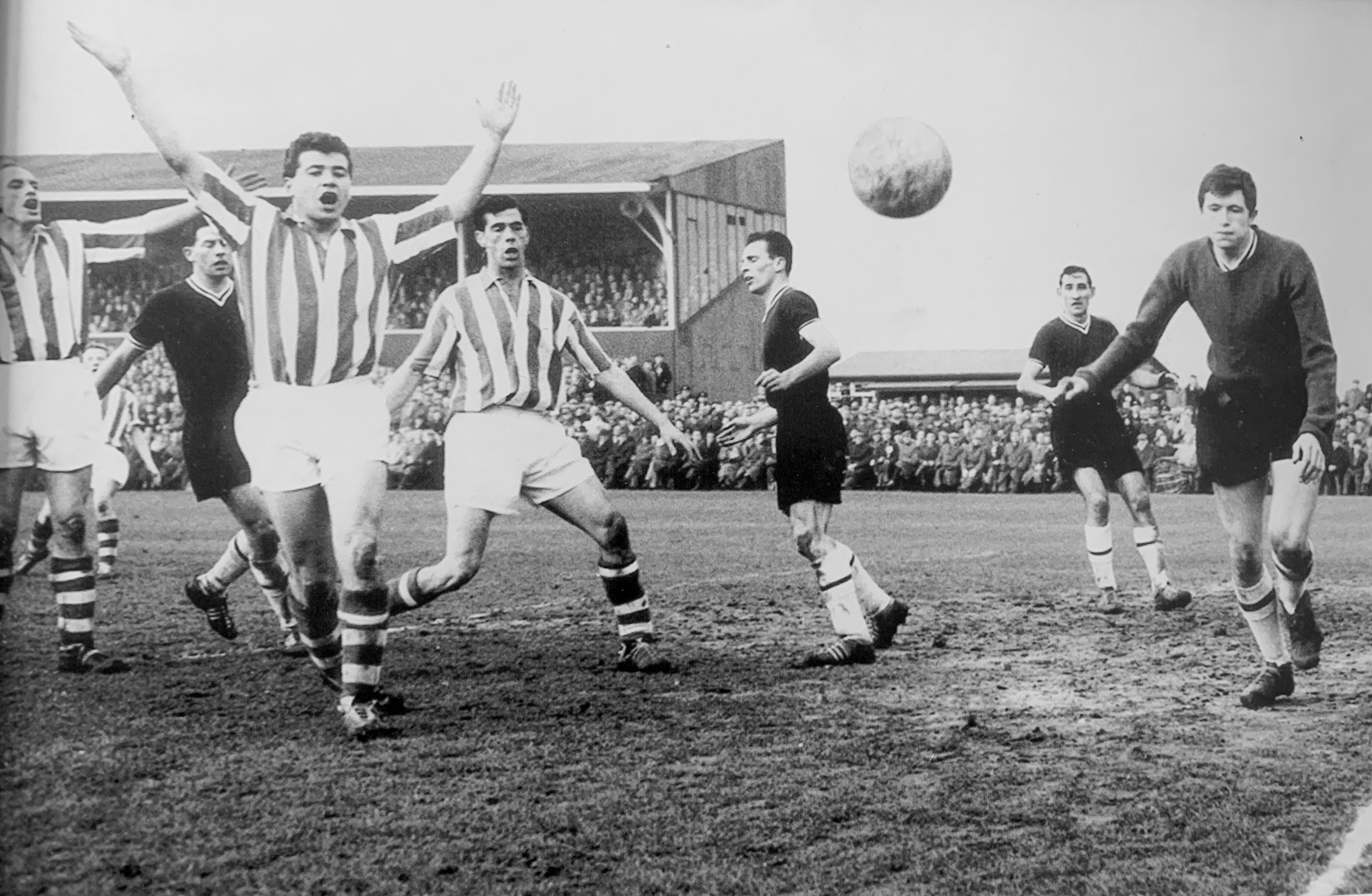
A match at the stadium in the 1950s

Work was frantic at Twerton Park to ready it for what was a predicted 20,000 gate versus Aston Villa. Extra terracing was cut on the banks. The gates were opened at 12:30 and over 50 police were present, as 17,000 made their way to the ground, Bath City's record league attendance. In the summer of 1946 the stadium was in discussion to be converted to an arena for Greyhound racing, with the Bath Chronicle reporting that "they might be forced to sell unless greater support was shown." Chairman at the time, Arthur Mortimer, stated that he was “against dog racing, though there may be no alternative." That year, the stadium was in plans for redevelopment. Mortimer stated that he desired to provide Bath with a stadium equal to, if not superior to any in the West of England.

With the stadium in heavy discussion for expansion, to a capacity of 40,000, in aim to become; "a stadium worthy of the city". It was planned first to move the playing field a few yards to the west to enable a bank at the Bath End, and to extend the Popular Side, with the addition of further concrete terracing. The dressing room and facilities within the stadium were also being discussed for improvement. The greyhound racing proposal was later rejected in August 1946 as it had recently been decided that no dog racing was allowed for any league club, the management committee felt their efforts towards gaining entry into the English Football League would be vetoed. The chairman stated: "We feel that our geographical position alone entitles us to a higher place in the sun, with Bath and the surrounding districts, we can call upon 100,000 to support league football in the town.

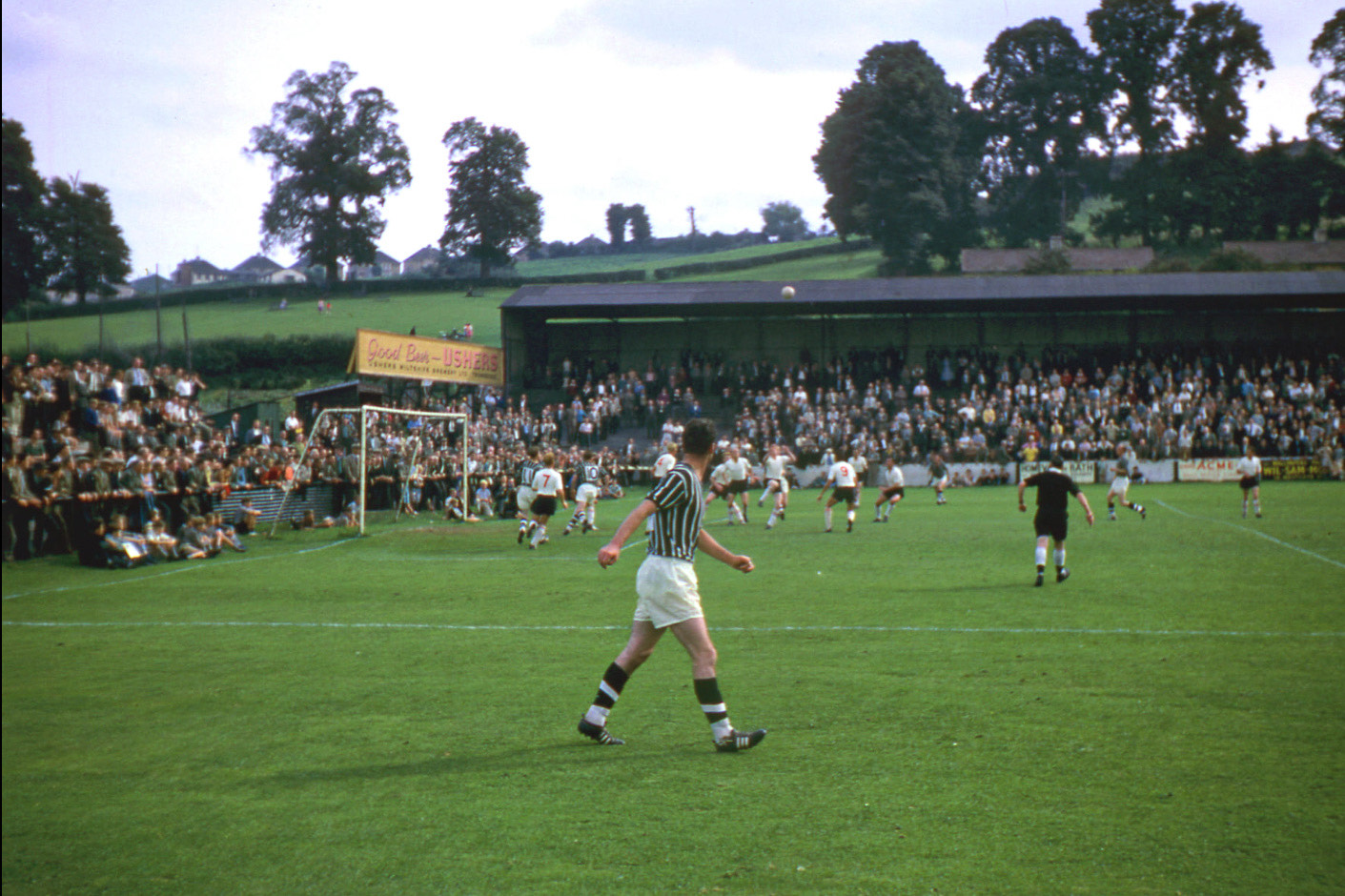
Twerton Park in 1962

During the 1946–47 season, work went on to improve Twerton, and rubble from bombsites around the city was "dropped at the ground" ready as hardcore for the terraces and to build up the banking. A refreshment hut was also approved by the Bath surveying commission. In 1948, work had continued on the stadium, the bank at the front of the Grandstand was concreted, a portion of the Popular Side closer to what is now the Bristol End, was to be cleared and moved to form a new bank, concurrently the pitch was moved westwards, to allow greater space for spectators at the Bath End and space for terracing to be built.

At the end of May 1950, the government announced the end of petrol rationing, giving indirect access to greater amounts of timber and building materials. The club consequently made plans to put right some parts of the stadium which had been damaged in the war, such as repairing some of the damaged stand on The Popular Side. In 1956, the supporters club began work on fencing the south and west sides of the stadium, with concrete posts holding 500 yards of chain link, and an evergreen hedge to make it unclimbable. A pair of wide gates were erected with two ticket entrances for pedestrians, as the ground began to "take a tidier look. For the 1956–57 season crowds were averaging 3,500-4,000.

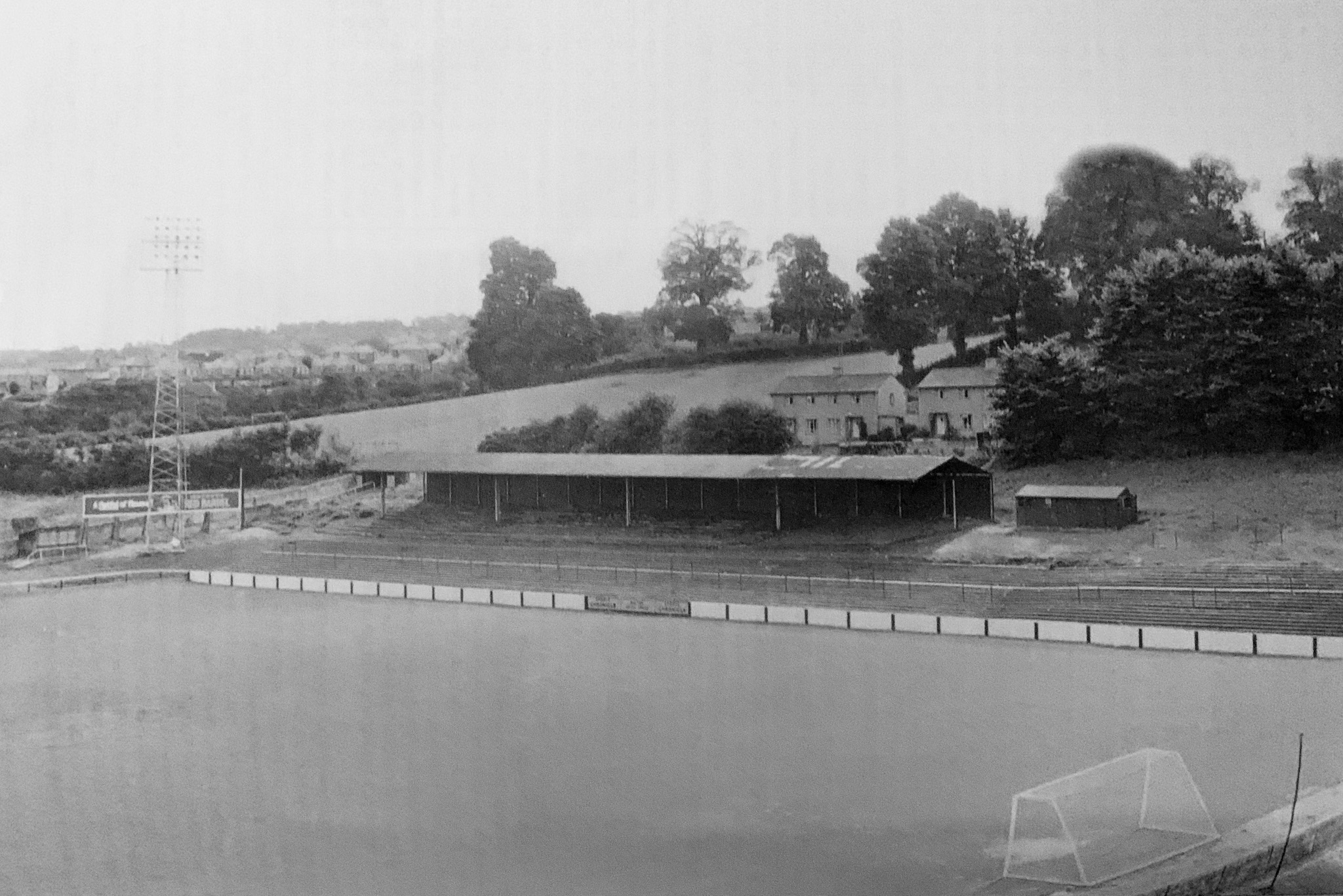
Twerton Park, a view of The Popular Side in 1966.

In 1961, Bath City were to play Brighton & Hove Albion in the FA Cup third round. Work began to remove 1,500 tons of earth from the Bristol End, for the construction of a temporary stand to hold an extra 2,000 people. It was a calculated gamble by chairman Arthur Mortimer who was aware that the cost would almost held the profit margins but he was adamant that as many Bathonian's as possible should see the game. More of The Popular Side terracing was concreted, the press had "boosted the game to such as degree" that many predicted 15,000, in fact 18,020 roared Bath City on. Attendances on average during the 1940s and 1950s were some of the highest recorded in Bath City's history. Notable large home attendances during this period included; 17,000 in 1944 vs Aston Villa 14,000 vs Southend United in the 1952–53 season and 11,700 at Twerton Park against rivals Yeovil Town in 1957. The record attendance of 18,020 was recorded in 1960 versus Brighton & Hove Albion.

=== Capacity reduction and The Rovers years (1967–2000) ===
In 1967, "Wembley style" goalposts were added the ground, the same year, the pitch was moved back towards the Bristol End by 20 feet. New Director, Reg Ironside, announced new significant changes would be made to the ground, with the provision of a new social club, replacing the building in the car park. On the Popular Side, Bath City had sold some of the land for housing and the cover was taken down and moved nearer the pitch, the terracing was partly removed, dropping the stand's capacity significantly, Ironside stated the reason was that a new social club would provide a large portion of the income needed to run Bath City, as gate money and various fund raising schemes were proving inefficient. On 23 May 1970, the stadium hosted a pop concert, a crowd of 15,000 was predicted but the actual attendance ended being a third of that number.

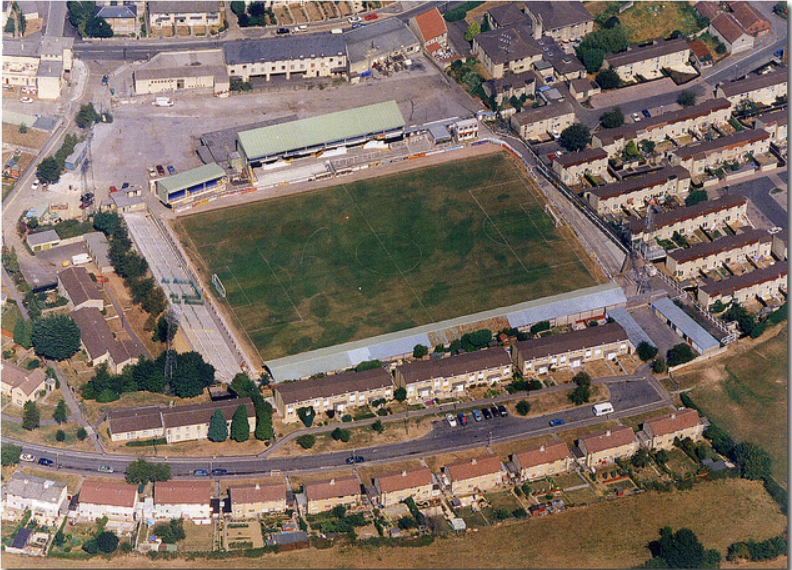
An aerial shot of the ground in the 1980s

It was expected that it would wipe a third of the debts from the book but in fact, it contributed to heavy losses as hundreds watched from Innox Park above, and more climbed over the fences, when well known band, Fleetwood Mac played. To add to the "farce" the lights and amplifies were all switches off as the band played. The festival would be known as the "Aqua Sulis incident." In 1986, Bristol Rovers moved to Twerton. Contractors moved in to start work on the terraces with repaired and new turnstiles and gates, plus a retaining wall and segregation fencing. The stadium went under heavy reconstruction, with the Bristol End's terracing being implemented, turnstiles at the west end of the stadium were also added to accommodate away fans, costing £80,000. The ground braced itself for crowds approaching 7–8,000. Bristol Rovers' first game at Twerton Park attracted 4,000 against Reading. Before the start of the 1987–88 season Bath and Rovers had stumped up £8,000 for a new pitch.

In 1988, Twerton was getting used to big crowds for Bristol Rovers, with 8,400 crammed in versus Wolverhampton Wanderers. In 1989, Rovers announced the building of a new 230 seater stand, to the west of the main stand. Former Chairman; Gilbert Walshaw and Arthur Mortimer's long dream of League football appeared to have moved a step closer. That season, Bristol Rovers won the Football League Third Division, clinching the title on 2 May 1990 with a 3–0 victory over fierce rivals Bristol City, beating the Robins to the title by 2 points. Several hours after the game, at midnight, the Grandstand was heavily damaged by Bristol City Hooligans. It was a stunning blow for all at both clubs, the video monitoring box was destroyed along with the press box, seating and social rooms inside. Nine Bristol City supporters were later convicted of arson. The cost to rebuild the Main Stand was £800,000 A temporary stand was put up, though the grandstand was fully refurbished in June. Rovers notably played Liverpool in the FA cup on 5 February 1992, in front of a crowd of over 9,000.

=== The modern era (2000–present) ===
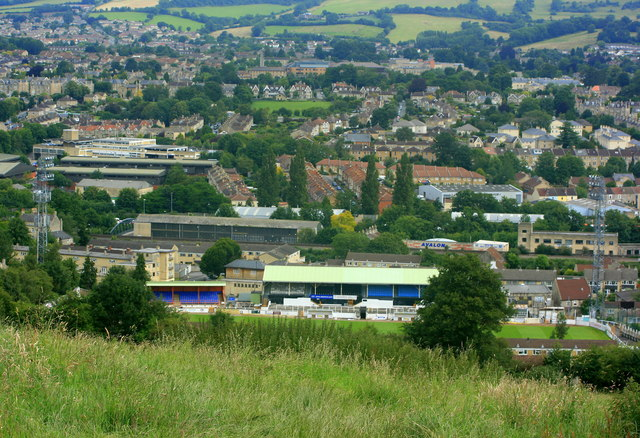
View of Twerton Park from Innox Park

From 2000 onwards, the ground hosted Team Bath, who were a full-time professional team playing in the Conference South until their resignation at the end of the 2008–09 season. At the end of the 2011–12 season the club offered the naming rights to Twerton Park for just £50. The offer drew 167 entries from as far afield as the US, Australia, Norway and Singapore which raised £8,350 for Bath City. Businesses made up 58 of the entries with only a handful of the remaining personalised entries being deemed unsuitable. The winning entry drawn at random was The Mayday Trust, a charitable organisation that helps to re-home vulnerable people.

In 2021, Bath City fan, gave an interview with The Athletic; stating: "I made my debut for Bath in the late 1970s period and the first thing that strikes me now is that the stadium looks barely any different.” Talks have been held in the past between Bath Rugby and Bath City about sharing a ground, as the former team wish to move away from their home ground Recreation Ground, although nothing has amounted from this. Following the resignation of Chairman Manda Rigby, she claimed that the club needed to move away from Twerton Park to "sustain their finances".

== Stands ==
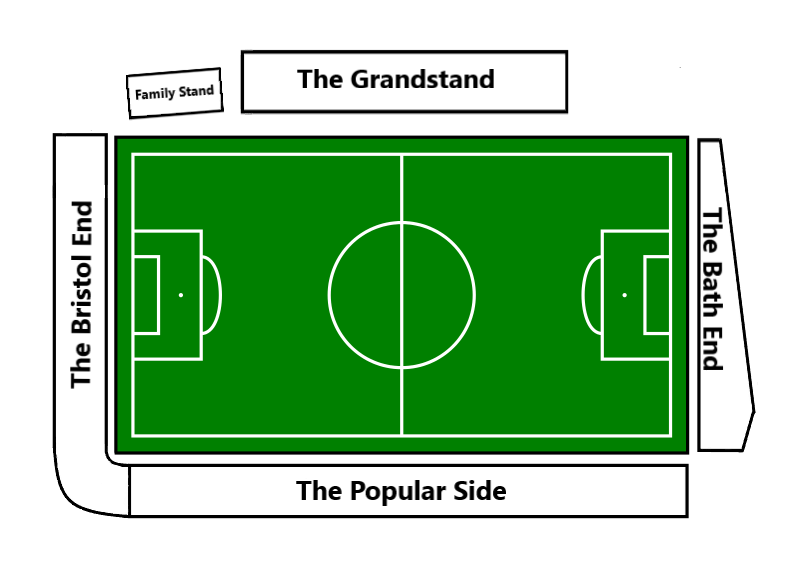
Twerton Park plan. North towards the Grandstand, South towards the Popular Side

Currently, Twerton Park has a recently reduced capacity of 4,070, 1,006 of which are seated. However the physical capacity of the ground is 8,840.

Physical Capacity (8,840) of each stand

Stand	For	Capacity
The Grandstand	Home Fans	1,805 (seated & standing)
The Popular Side	Home Fans	3,500 (standing)
The Bath End	Home Fans	800 (standing)
Family Stand	Home and away fans	235 (seated)
The Bristol End	Home and away fans	2,500 (standing)

Reduced Capacity (4,070) of each stand

Stand	For	Capacity
The Grandstand	Home Fans	1,000 (seated & standing)
The Popular Side	Home Fans	1,035 (standing)
The Bath End	Home Fans	300 (standing)
Family Stand	Home and away fans	235 (seated)
The Bristol End	Home and away fans	1,500 (standing)

=== The Grandstand ===
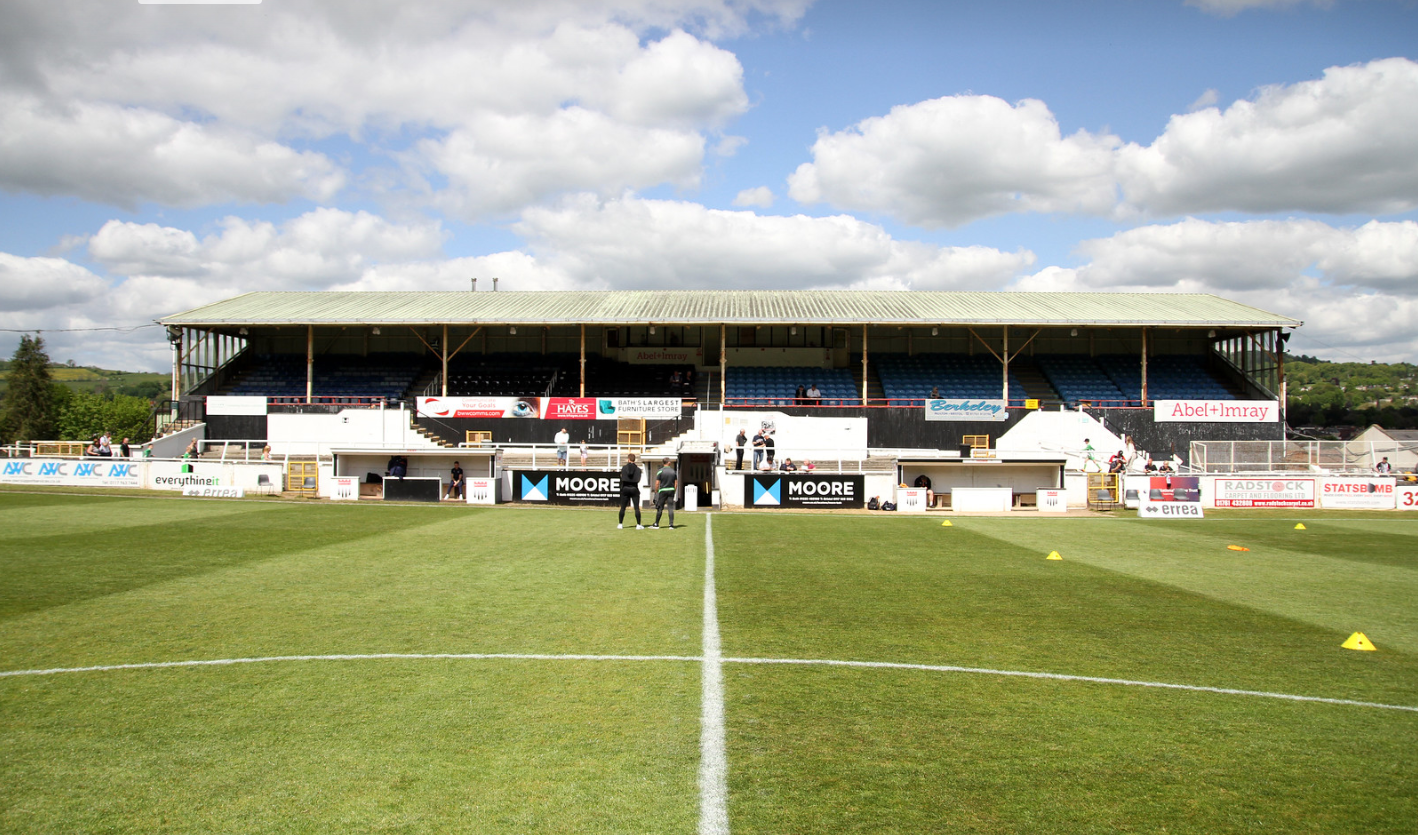

The grandstand has a physical capacity of 771 seated and 1,034 standing spectators. It is located to the north of the stadium and encompasses the majority of the stadiums seating. The Grandstand is the oldest of the four stands, being constructed in 1932. It has a raised covered seating area, meaning spectators must climb a small set of stairs for entry. It has a steeply angled roof which points sharply downwards, with windshields to each side and a number of supporting pillars across the front. Below is a small uncovered terrace area which can house around 800 fans at full capacity.

Blue seats line the majority of the stand though premium black seats are located down the middle. It is single tiered. As the ground's main stand, it houses nearly all of the ground's more established facilities, including Randall's bar, club offices, the club shop, and the two sets of player dressing rooms, as well as other multi purpose rooms. In 1990 the Grandstand was heavily damaged by Bristol City Hooligans, as a result the stand required refurbishment, which cost £800,000 Entrance to all stands within the stadium is controlled by traditional turnstiles directly outside of the Grandstand on either end. The club's official bar is just outside of the grandstand next to the main car park. It was named "Charlies" in honour of Bath's record goal scorer Charlie Fleming.

=== The Bath End ===
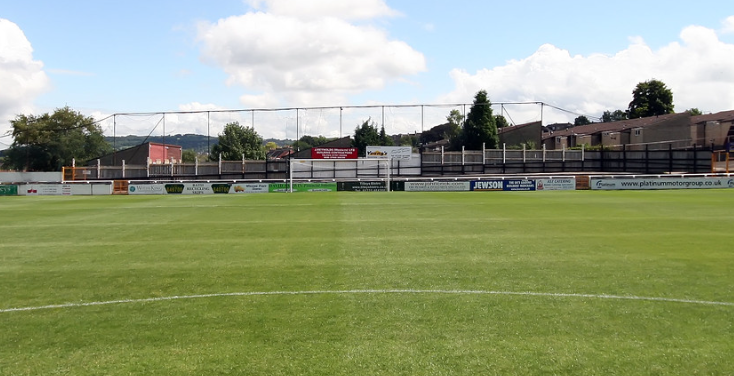

Located to the east of the ground, the smallest of the four stands. The Bath End contains no roofing, and the terracing is shallow, stretching just 4-5 rows deep, the stand gets wider as it gets closer to the Popular Side. Wooden fencing lines the back of the stand. The Bath End is all standing, and can hold 800 fans at full physical capacity. The terrace contains netting behind it in an attempt to prevent loose balls from being kicked out of the ground.

=== The Popular Side ===
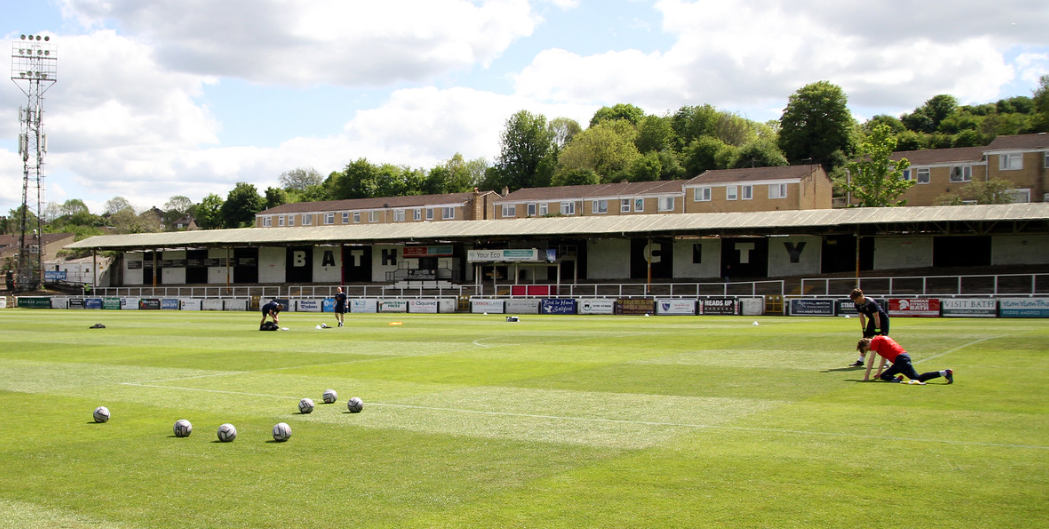

Located opposite the Grandstand, with a physical capacity of 3,500 the terrace runs the length of the pitch and is covered by metal roofing. The Popular Side is home to the club's most vocal and passionate support, with flags and banners being put up at either end of which Bath City are attacking. The stand has a drinks/snacks bar at the half way line. The terrace was originally designed to hold around 6,000 fans, the stand has since been brought forward significantly and its overall capacity reduced. On 2 August 2022 the club announced the opening of a bar on The Popular Side.

=== The Bristol End ===
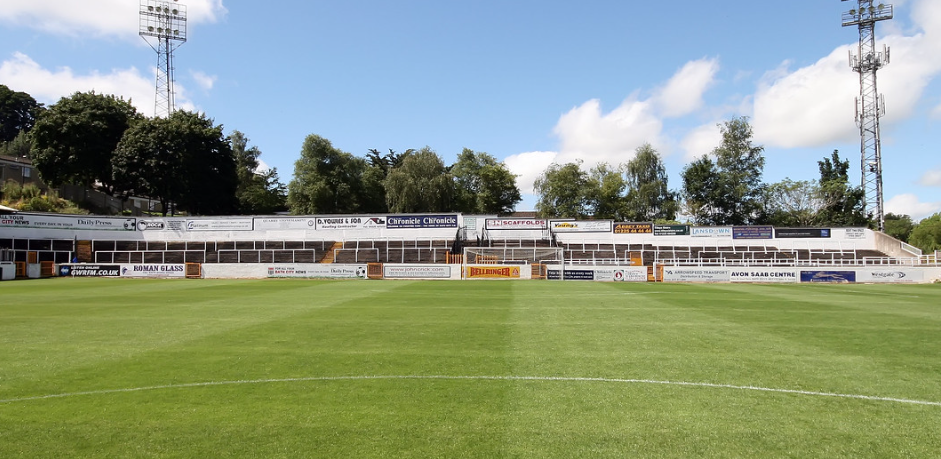

Located to the west, an open, all standing, terrace which is the designated away end when segregation is put in place, significantly larger than the Bath End at the opposing goal with a physical capacity of 2,500. The terracing goes deeper and higher than both the Bath End and The Popular Side, being 26 steps high. The Bristol End is lined with two sets of metal barriers running parallel to the stand, the lower barrier being placed on the 10th step from the pitch height, and the upper barrier placed on the 18th. The barriers are more commonly used for fans to lean on during matches, but when at maximum capacity, they act as protection against a ‘human push or crush.’

== Attendances ==
Season	Bath City					
Season	Attendance	League	Level			
2021–22	1,204	National League South	6			
2020–21	0 (Note: No fans permitted for the 2020–21 season on account of the ongoing COVID-19 pandemic)	National League South	6			
2019–20	1,081	National League South	6			
2018–19	1,142	National League South	6			
2017–18	702	National League South	6			
2016–17	612	National League South	6			
2015–16	727	National League South	6			
2014–15	500	National League South	6			
2013–14	599	National League South	6			
2012–13	583	National League South	6			
2011–12	848	National League	5			
2010–11	1,053	National League	5			
2009–10	965	Conference South	6			
2008–09	618	Conference South	6			
2007–08	851	Conference South	6			
2006–07	930	Southern League	7			
2005–06	732	Southern League	7			
2004–05	616	Southern League	7			
2003–04	714	Southern League	6			
2002–03	866	Southern League	6			
2001–02	850	Southern League	6			
2000–01	812	Southern League	6			
1999–00	993	Southern League	6			
1998–99	793	Southern League	6			
1997–98	735	Southern League	6	Bristol Rovers		
1996–97	685	Conference Premier	5	Attendance	League	Level
1995–96	663	Conference Premier	5	5,279	Second Division	3
1994–95	887	Conference Premier	5	5,173	Second Division	3
1993–94	1,393	Conference Premier	5	5,338	Second Division	3
1992–93	797	Conference Premier	5	5,745	First Division	2
1991–92	826	Conference Premier	5	5,850	Second Division	2
1990–91	821	Conference Premier	5	5,929	Second Division	2
1989–90	560	Southern League	6	6,202	Third Division	3
1988–89	625	Southern League	6	5,259	Third Division	3
1987–88	637	Alliance Premier League	5	3,653	Third Division	3
1986–87	590	Alliance Premier League	5	3,246	Third Division	3
1985–86	688	Alliance Premier League	5			
1984–85	635	Alliance Premier League	5			
1983–84	738	Alliance Premier League	5			
1982–83	888	Alliance Premier League	5			
1981–82	898	Alliance Premier League	5			
1980–81	970	Alliance Premier League	5			
1979–80	1,060	Alliance Premier League	5			
1978–79	1,611	Southern League Premier	n/a			
1977–78	1,134	Southern League Premier	n/a			
1976–77	867	Southern League Premier	n/a			
1975–76	n/a	Southern League Premier	n/a			
1974–75	n/a	Southern League Premier	n/a			
1973–74	1,309	Southern League Division One	n/a			
1972–73	1,229	Southern League Division One	n/a			
1971–72	1,308	Southern League Premier	n/a			
1970–71	1,239	Southern League Premier	n/a			
1969–70	1,831	Southern League Premier	n/a			
1968–69	2,151	Southern League Division One	n/a			
1967–68	2,076	Southern League Division One	n/a			
1966–67	2,191	Southern League Premier	n/a			
1965–66	2,030	Southern League Division One	n/a			
1964–65	1,910	Southern League Premier	n/a			
1963–64	2,993	Southern League Premier	n/a			
1962–63	2,316	Southern League Premier	n/a			
1961–62	3,095	Southern League Premier	n/a			
1960–61	2,902	Southern League Premier	n/a			
1959–60	4,940	Southern League Premier	n/a			

== Future ==
Twerton Park was recently prepared for redevelopment. Bath City first announced plans on 10 October 2017. Initially, Bath City were in discussions with private investment company; Greenacre Capital who wished to build purpose built student accommodation on the adjoining land. The agreement was for Bath City to give up part of their land to Greenacre, in exchange for the latter to build the club a new grandstand and facilities, which would include affordable housing, a sports bar, gym, offices and community space. Bath City later announced plans to convert the playing surface to a third-generation 3G synthetic surface on the 15 March 2018.

Nick Blofeld, Bath City's Chairman stated, “Following Bath City's change to community ownership earlier this year, we are delighted to confirm our intention to undertake a partial redevelopment of the ground and an upgrade of the facilities. We believe that Bath City should be an integral part of the community in Twerton, and it is the Board's desire to secure the long term, sustainable future of the football club at Twerton Park. We also aim to improve the existing club facilities and make them more appropriate for the wider community, so that the club can become more of a local hub.”

On the evening of Tuesday 21 November 2017, approximately 70 people attended an event at Twerton Park to provide initial feedback on the subject of the redevelopment. Bath City stated that the attendees were generally positive on the idea and the impact it could have on the area. Most saw the redevelopment as an opportunity to invest in the area and "create a new community hub and give the club a new lease of life." On the 4 March 2019, Bath City released a CGI animation of the proposed future development.

On 2 March 2020, sixteen Twerton-based businesses and community organisations joined in collaboration to write an open letter to The Bath Chronicle. In the letter, they expressed their support for the club's redevelopment plans and shared the hope that Bath City's application would receive approval from the Bath and North East Somerset council planners. Although over 800 people backed the new proposals, councillors of BANES voiced concerns about living conditions - with some rooms compared to "prison cells" - and the potential negative impacts of such a high student influx in a residential area.

Other council members shared concerns about the student accommodation raised by planning officers, stating the scale of the seven-storey block was “excessive, visually intrusive and over-dominant”. They further added; “due to the poor outlook, quantity and quality of amenity spaces, room sizes and layouts”, would create a poor quality and “oppressive living environment” for future occupiers of the accommodation. Twerton councillor Sarah Moore had objected to the plans, saying she considered them to be “overdevelopment with insufficient space to provide adequate housing facilities for the numbers and types of properties proposed”. Thus, on 10 March 2020, the plans were rejected.

== Records ==
The highest attendance recorded at Twerton Park is 18,020 for an FA Cup third round tie between Bath City and Brighton & Hove Albion on 9 January January 1960. The record league attendance was 17,000 set between Bath City and Aston Villa, in the Football League North on 14 April 1944. The record highest average attendance at Twerton Park was in the 1989–90 season, when an average of 6,202 watched Bristol Rovers play in the Third Division. The record lowest average attendance at the ground came in the 2014–15 season when an average of just 500 spectators watched Bath City play each match.

== Transport ==
Twerton Park (Somerset)

The stadium is located just south of Twerton High Street, which links to the A36 or the (Lower Bristol Road), which has direct access to Bristol if one were ravelling west, and to the A46 in Bathwick, which eventually connects with the M4, just South East of Yate. One would exit the M4 at junction18 and follow the A46 signposted Bath. After 8 miles before a tunnel keep in left hand lane (Bath A4) to roundabout. Take the third exit and follow signs for A4 Bath.

Follow A4 signs around southern perimeter of the city for 3 miles. After passing Bathwick Tyres on the left, in 100 yards at traffic lights turn left, signposted Twerton, through a railway arch with an 11 ft 6in height restriction. Twerton Park is 200 yards on the left after a row of shops. On foot, the stadium is approximately 1.9 miles (3.2 km) from Bath Spa railway station, roughly a 40 minute walk westwards. The stadium is 3 km or 1.8 miles from the city centre.
