= George Carver (disambiguation) =

George Carver may refer to:

- George Carver (academic) (1888–1949), American professor
- George Carver (cricketer) (1879–1912), English cricketer
- George Washington Carver (c. 1864–1943), American botanist

== See also ==
- George C. Clerk, full name George Carver Clerk (1931–2019), Ghanaian botanist
