= Bath City W.F.C. =

Association football club in England

Bath City Women
- Full name: Bath City Women's Football Club
- Nickname: The Romans
- Founded: 2022; 4 years ago
- Ground: Twerton Park
- Capacity: 8,840 (restricted to 3,528 for safety reasons)
- Owner: Bath City Supporters' Society
- Chairman: Nick Blofeld
- Manager: Matt Abreu
- League: Somerset County Women's league
- Website: bathcityfc.com
Home colours	Away colours

Bath City Women's Football Club is a football club based in Bath, Somerset, England. The club is affiliated to the Somerset FA and currently compete in the South West Regional Women's League Division One, the sixth tier of Women's English football. Though multiple Bath City women's teams have existed in the past, the current team was founded in 2022. The team play their home games at Twerton Park. Like the men's team, the women's squad play in black and white shirts, and are nicknamed "The Romans" which stems from Bath's ancient Roman history.

== History ==
=== Previous Teams ===
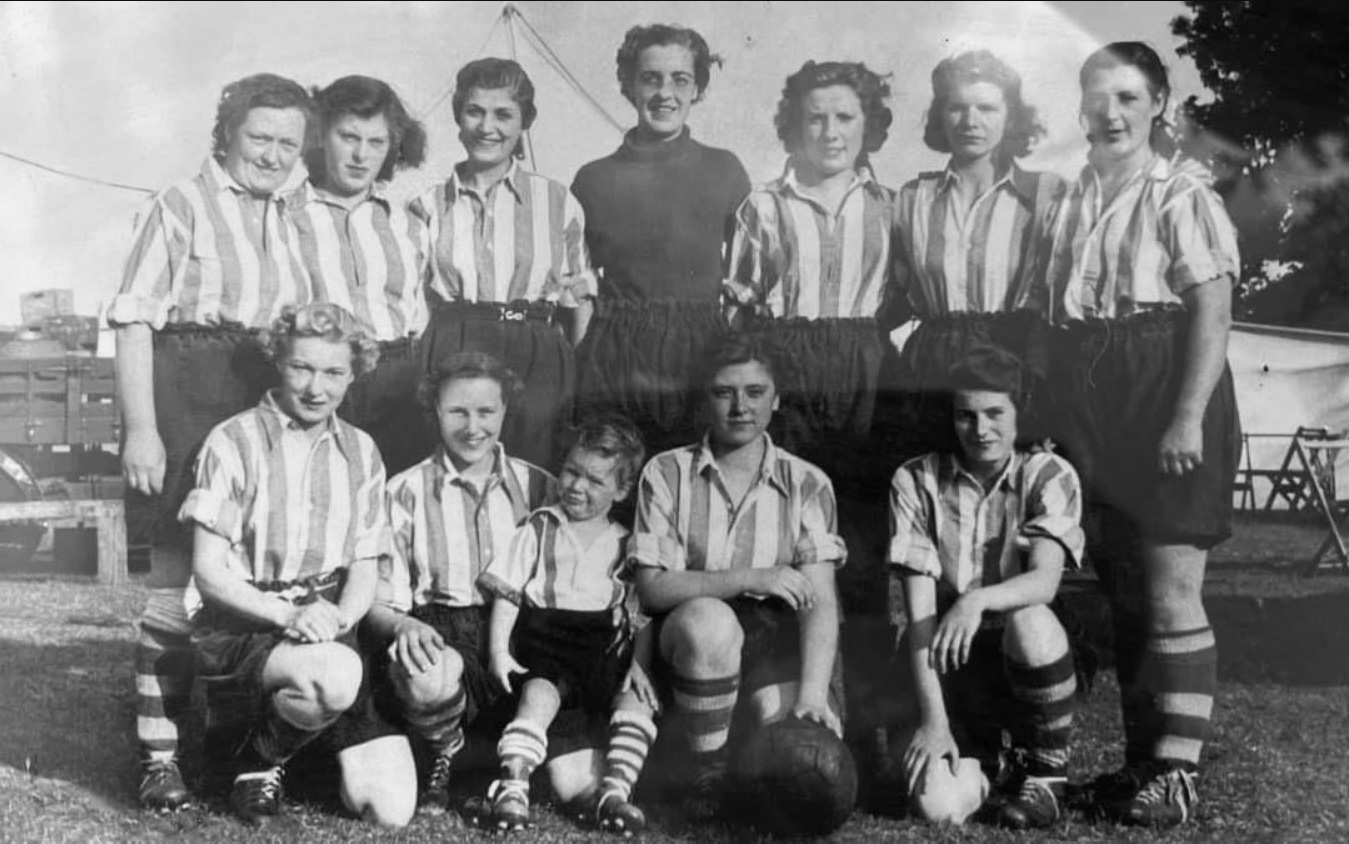
Bath City women's team in 1952

In June, 1920, the first record of any women's team in Bath was formed as simply; "Bath Ladies Football Club". With The Bath Chronicle at the time stating: "Enthusiastic reception of the proposed club, many ladies have shown their wish to join." Application's for squad entry were received from places as far as Gloucester, Bristol and the Isle of Wight. It was suggested by Chairman Mr Hopkins that the colours ought to be the same as the men's; black and white jerseys, with black shorts, black stockings, white rings, and black woolly caps. A year later In 1921, Bath City Ladies played at Old Trafford in front of 31,000 to raise money for unemployed ex-servicemen in Manchester. The fixture raised £2,000 for the fund to help returning soldiers from the World War 1. On Saturday 28 April 1921, the women's team played Southampton Women's in front of 12,000 at Bristol. However, in the same year, The Football Association banned women's football because the Association felt the physicality of the game was; "unsuitable for women". Women's football suffered for decades but it was reintroduced around the mid-century and has since progressed significantly.

=== Current team launch (2022–present) ===
The current club were founded in June 2022. On 29 August 2022, for the final game of pre-season preparation, The Bath City women’s team won 9–0 against Wells City ladies. However the club started the league campaign poorly. On Sunday 2 September 2022, the team competed in their first ever competitive league match, in which they lost 4–0 to Penhill ladies away. Albeit a poor start did not hinder the squad, a run of winning steaks, and good performances placed the club second in the Somerset County women’s league, as of March, 2023. The team achieved promotion in its first ever season, finishing 2nd in the league on 31 points in 18 games, and will go on to play in the South West Regional Football League, the sixth tier of English football.

== Stadium ==
Twerton Park shown within Somerset and the UK

The women’s team have stated playing at Twerton since their inception. The stadium has a physical capacity of 8,840 1,006 of which are seats. It has been the home of Bath City F.C. since 1932. From 1986 to 1996 Bristol Rovers played at the ground following their departure from Eastville. From 2020 the ground also became the home stadium for Bristol City Women.

The stadium has four stands; the Bath End, the Grandstand, The Popular Side, and the Bristol End. Though the site opened in 1909, the stadium was not constructed until 1932, with The Grandstand being the first of the four stands to be constructed. The stadium is 2.5 km (1.6 miles) from the city centre. The two bars within the stadium are named after former players: Charlies' (Charlie Fleming), and Randall's (Paul Randall). Twerton Park has undergone several expansions throughout its history, though the decades in which it saw the most development were the 1930s, 1960s and 1980s - including the addition of the family stand, West of The Grandstand. Future expansion is likely to involve the complete redevelopment of The Grandstand and the surrounding car park.

== Players ==
As of 3 February 2023

Note: Flags indicate national team as defined under FIFA eligibility rules; some limited exceptions apply. Players may hold more than one non-FIFA nationality.

No.	Pos.	Nation	Player
1	GK	ENG	Sophie Campbell (Vice-captain)
7	DF	ENG	Tara Taylor (Captain)
3	DF	ENG	Ceris Evans
4	DF	ENG	Ali Diegutis
5	DF	ENG	Harleigh Curtis
6	MF	ENG	Amy Hucker
7	MF	ENG	Liv Davis

No.	Pos.	Nation	Player
8	MF	ENG	Karen Jones
8	FW	ENG	Jade Whale
12	MF	ENG	Chelsea Giles
11	FW	ENG	Ashanti Golding
14	FW	ENG	Tanea Wright
13	MF	ENG	Same Fensome
9	FW	ENG	Bronnie Cranfield
15	MF	ENG	Tazmin Dunn

== Club officials ==
=== Coaching and medical staff ===
As of 22 June 2022

Position	Name
Manager	(England) Matt Abreu
Assistant Manager	(England) Adam Casserly
Sports Scientist	(England) Aaron Hopkinson
Goalkeeping Coach	(England) Steve Book
Sports Therapist	(England) Sarah Carr
Sports Masseur	(England) Omar El Bezra
Scout	(England) Mike Ford
Kit Manager	(England) Simon Jenkins

=== Board of directors ===
As of 17 November 2022

Position	Name
Chairman	(England) Nick Blofeld
Football Chairman	(England) Paul Williams
Community Director	(England) Joy Saunders
Sales & Marketing Director	(England) Jon Bickley
Commercial Director	(England) Matthew Falk
Director	(England) Jane Jones
Director	(England) Andrew Pierce
Director	(England) John Reynolds

== See also ==
- Bath City men’s
- List of women's association football clubs in England and Wales
- Women's football in England
- List of women's association football clubs
