= George Carver (cricketer) =

English cricketer

Personal information
- Full name: George James Carver
- Born: 4 May 1879; Long Ditton, Surrey, England
- Died: 1 October 1912 (aged 33); Bootle, Lancashire, England
- Batting: Unknown
- Bowling: Unknown-arm fast-medium
- Relatives: Frederick Mathews (brother-in-law)

Domestic team information
- Years: Team
- 1907: Surrey

Career statistics
Competition	First-class
Matches	1
Runs scored	36
Batting average	18.00
100s/50s	–/–
Top score	36
Balls bowled	108
Wickets	1
Bowling average	42.00
5 wickets in innings	–
10 wickets in match	–
Best bowling	1/42
Catches/stumpings	–/–
- Source: Cricinfo, 23 June 2012

George James Carver (4 May 1879 – 1 October 1912) was an English cricketer. Carver's batting style is unknown, though it is known he was a fast-medium bowler, though which arm he bowled with is also unknown. He was born at Thames Ditton, Surrey.

Carver made a single first-class appearance for Surrey against Gloucestershire in the 1907 County Championship at the Ashley Down Ground, Bristol. Surrey won the toss and elected to bat, making 189 all out, with Carver scoring 36 runs before he was dismissed by Francis Roberts. Gloucestershire responded in their first-innings by making 404 all out, with Carver taking a single wicket, that of Percy Mills, to finish with figures of 1/42 from eighteen overs. Surrey were then dismissed for 171 in their second-innings, with Carver being dismissed by Henry Huggins for a duck. Gloucestershire won the match by an innings and 44 runs. This was his only major appearance for Surrey.

He died at Bootle, Lancashire, on 1 October 1912. His brothers-in-law, Frederick Mathews, also played first-class cricket.
