= 1989–90 Bristol Rovers F.C. season =

Bristol Rovers F.C.
1989–90 season
- Chairman: Geoff Dunford
- Manager: Gerry Francis
- Stadium: Twerton Park
- Football League Third Division: Champions (promoted); W:26 D:15 L:5 F:71 A:35
- FA Cup: First Round
- Littlewoods Challenge Cup: First Round
- Leyland DAF Cup: Runners-up
- Top goalscorer: League: David Mehew (18); All: David Mehew (21)
- Highest home attendance: 9,831 (vs Bristol City, 2 May 1990)
- Lowest home attendance: 2,218 (vs Torquay United, 7 November 1989)

Bristol Rovers F.C. spent the 1989–90 season in the Football League Third Division. They won the league and were promoted to the Football League Second Division for the 1990–91 season.

Rovers took the top position with a 3–0 win against their biggest rivals, Bristol City in the penultimate match of the season.

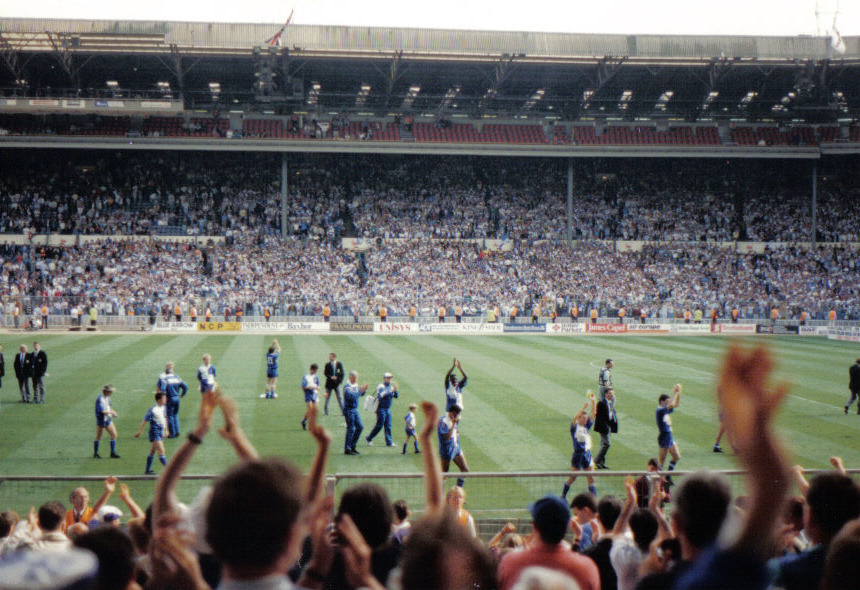
Rovers players take a lap of honor after a 2–1 loss in the Leyland DAF Cup (EFL Trophy) Final against Tranmere Rovers, at Old Wembley Stadium.

== League table ==
Pos	Team	Pld	W	D	L	GF	GA	GD	Pts	Promotion or relegation
1	Bristol Rovers (C, P)	46	26	15	5	71	35	+36	93	Promotion to the Second Division
2	Bristol City (P)	46	27	10	9	76	40	+36	91	Promotion to the Second Division
3	Notts County (O, P)	46	25	12	9	73	53	+20	87	Qualification for the Third Division play-offs
4	Tranmere Rovers	46	23	11	12	86	49	+37	80	Qualification for the Third Division play-offs
5	Bury	46	21	11	14	70	49	+21	74	Qualification for the Third Division play-offs

(C) Champions; (O) Play-off winners; (P) Promoted
