= Catharine Carver =

- Born: Catharine DeFrance Carver; September 17, 1921; Cambridge, Ohio, United States
- Died: November 11, 1997 (aged 76); Westminster, London, England
- Citizenship: United States (birth), United Kingdom (naturalized)
- Education: Muskingum College; University of Chicago
- Occupation: Publisher's editor

Catharine DeFrance Carver (September 17, 1921 – November 11, 1997) was an American-British publisher's editor who worked from the 1940s to the 1990s. She worked for Reynal & Hitchcock, Harcourt Brace, Viking Press, J. B. Lippincott & Co., and The New Yorker in the United States before deciding to severe all ties with the United States and went to England in the 1960s. Carver went on to be employed by Chatto & Windus, John Murray, Oxford University Press, Victor Gollancz and Yale University Press among other publishers.

== Early life ==
Carver was born in Cambridge, Ohio on September 17, 1921. She was the only daughter of paymaster Don Carver, and his wife Harriett, née Aududdle. Not much is known about the early life of Craver. She graduated with a Bachelor of Arts degree from Muskingum College in close by New Concord in May 1943, and briefly enrolled at University of Chicago.

== Career ==
In 1945, Carver relocated to New York, and had her first job as an editor at the Reynal & Hitchcock firm. She was employed by Robert Giroux as an editor at Harcourt Brace in 1950, before moving on to work for publishers such as Viking Press, J. B. Lippincott & Co., and briefly for The New Yorker. In her career, Carver worked with authors Hannah Arendt, Saul Bellow, Lionel Trilling, Christopher Fry, Flannery O'Connor, Salman Rushdie, Elizabeth Bishop, Iris Murdoch, John Berryman, Bernard Malamud, Richard Ellmann, Leon Edel and Richard Holmes. She was assistant editor of Partisan Review in the mid-1950s. and wrote some short stories that were published.

Carver decided to severe any ties she had with the United States for undisclosed reasons in the 1960s, and moved to the United Kingdom, the country where she would eventually gain citizenship. She resided in London and found an editorial roles at Chatto & Windus and John Murray; she initially decided against joining Oxford University Press (OUP) because Chatto & Windus required her services more. Carver later joined OUP but she resigned in 1976 when the company closed its London office and moved to Oxford because she wanted to remain in the capital. She preferred to find alternative employment, working for Victor Gollancz and then freelance for Yale University Press among other publishers. In 1982, friends of Carver's in the United States nominated her for the PEN/Roger Klein award, which she declined to take.

In 1983, Carver sold many of her belongings and her apartment, and lived in a series of temporary accommodations in Rome, Amsterdam and Paris. She continued to assist her former friends with editing books without payment of money, and worked for Trianon Press in Paris. A minor collapse in 1989 was followed by her having a stroke that impaired her ability to communicate articulately, read or write two years later. She returned to England and lived with friends until further ill-health affected her.

== Personal life ==
On September 14, 1997, Carver had a major stroke, and was hospitalized at Chelsea and Westminster Hospital, where she died on November 11, 1997. She did not marry and no immediate family members outlived her. She was cremated at Mortlake Crematorium on November 18.

== Personality and approach ==
According to Michael Millgate, Carver was "strikingly attractive as a young woman, short, slim, and dark-haired, with something quizzical and even stern in her glance that was emphasized by the spectacles she then wore" and an individual who appeared "shrink a little and become more compacted, her hair lightened and whitened, the spectacles disappeared, and her face became at once plumper and more benign." The obituarist for The Times described Carver as "diminutive, dignified and diffident, she was modest, soft-spoken, gentle in manner", and someone who was "generous to the writers she helped, but not to herself." She was highly private, and liked to enjoy herself.

Carver had a high attention to detail and was able to conceptualize sequence and structure. She carefully observed quotations and references along with punctuation and word usage and would provide the author with a large amount of pages of questions and suggestions. A copy of a book Carver was editing would be returned to the author with signs of approval, disapproval or interrogation.
