= Doris Carver =

American computer scientist (1946–2024)

Doris Loveday Carver (1946 – February 11, 2024) was an American computer scientist and software engineer at Louisiana State University, where she was Dow Chemical Distinguished Professor of Computer Science and Engineering, and director of the Software Engineering Laboratory. She was the former president of the IEEE Computer Society and editor-in-chief of IEEE Computer.

== Education and career ==
Carver was a graduate of Carson–Newman College. She earned a master's degree in mathematics at the University of Tennessee in 1969, and entered doctoral study at Texas A&M University in the late 1970s, initially in mathematics, but quickly switching to computer science after taking a course in the subject. She completed her Ph.D. in computer science there in 1981, with the dissertation The effects of complexity on COBOL program changes.

After completing her doctorate, she joined the faculty at Southeastern Louisiana University before moving to Louisiana State University in 1986. At Louisiana State, she was Interim Dean of the Graduate School, Senior Associate Vice Chancellor of Research and Economic Development, and Interim Vice Chancellor of Research and Economic Development. She has also gone on leave from her faculty position to work as a program officer for the National Science Foundation.

She was president of the IEEE Computer Society in 1998, and later became editor-in-chief of IEEE Computer.

== Recognition ==
Carver was named a Fellow of the IEEE in 1998, "for contributions to the field of software engineering". She became a Fellow of the American Association for the Advancement of Science in 2002. In 2004, the IEEE Computer Society gave her their Richard E. Merwin Award for Distinguished Service.
