= Frederick Mathews =

English cricketer

Frederick John Mathews (7 March 1861 – 9 February 1950) was an English first-class cricketer active 1883 who played for Surrey. He was born in Thames Ditton; died in Surbiton.
