= Nick Blofeld =

British businessman (born 1963)

- Born: 1963 (age 62–63)
- Education: Bedford Modern School; Loughborough University

Nick Blofeld (born 1963) was managing director of Epsom Downs Racecourse between 2007 and 2009, Chief Executive of Bath Rugby between 2009 and 2014 and is currently Group Chief Operations Officer of Bath Rugby and its associated companies, Farleigh Properties Limited and Arena 365 Limited (owner of Bath's Rec). He is a trustee of the Bath Rugby Foundation. He is also the current Chairman of Bath City.

== Biography ==
Nicholas Blofeld was born in 1963 and educated at Bedford Modern School where he was head boy and Captain of the Rugby first XV.

He graduated from Loughborough University in 1995 and then joined the army on a short service commission based in Hong Kong, Zimbabwe and Brunei.

During his time in Hong Kong he also played for their national sevens side.

Blofeld became Chief Executive of Bath Rugby in 2009 after five years at Epsom Downs Racecourse where he was managing director. In September 2014 he became Group Chief Operating Officer of Bath Rugby, Farleigh Properties Ltd and Arena 1865 (owner of Bath's Rec). He is a trustee of the Bath Rugby Foundation.
