= Recreation Ground, Bath =

Large open space in the centre of Bath, England

The Recreation Ground
- The Rec
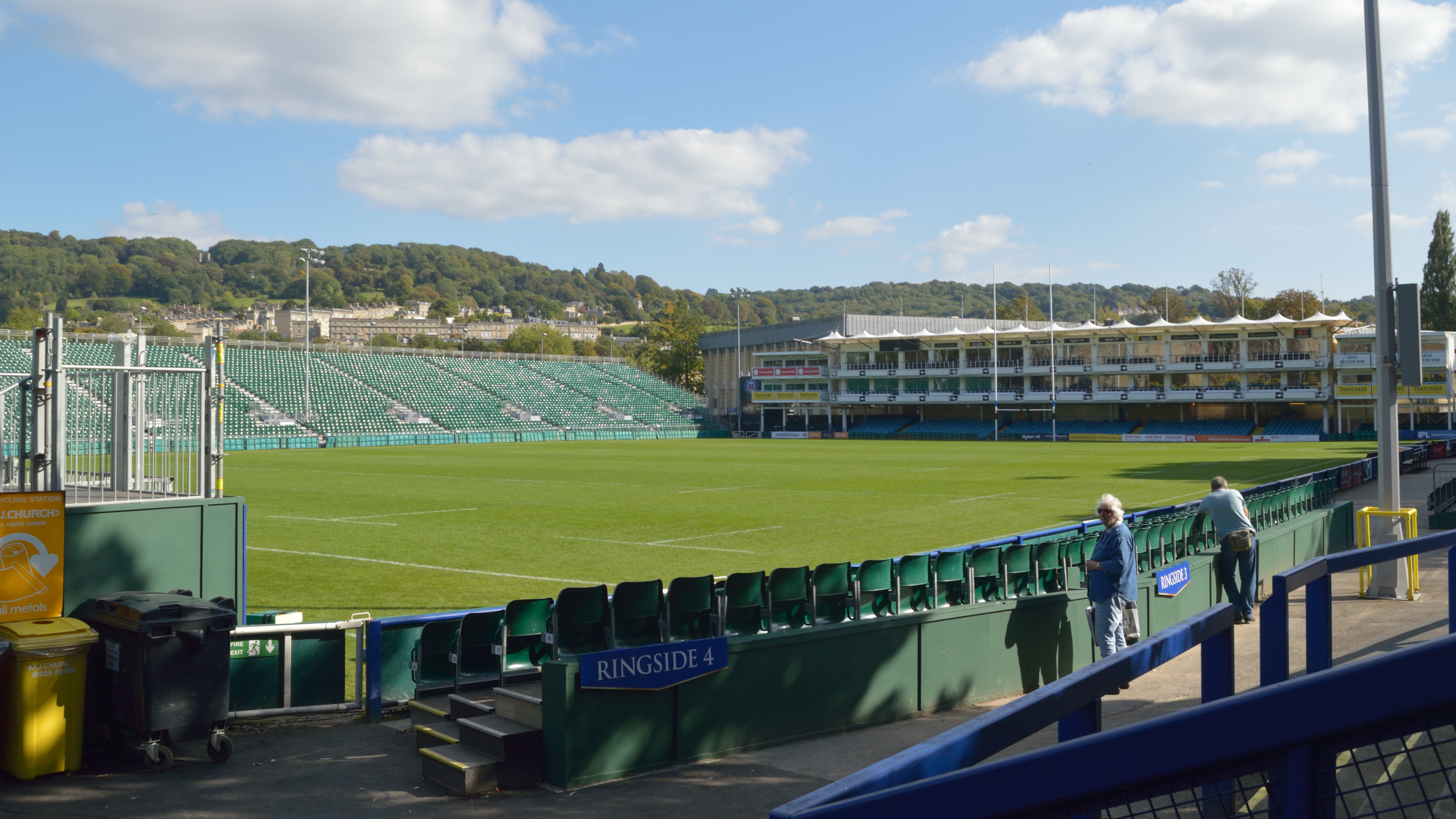
- Interactive map of The Recreation Ground
- Location: Bath, Somerset
- Coordinates: 51°22′56″N 2°21′19″W
- Owner: The Recreation Ground Trust, Bath
- Operator: Bath Recreation Ltd
- Capacity: 14,509
- Surface: Grass

Construction
- Opened: 1894

Tenants
- Bath Rugby Croquet, Tennis and Drama clubs: 1894-present various

The Recreation Ground (commonly known as The Rec) is a large open space in the centre of Bath, England, next to the River Avon, which is available to be used by permission from the Recreation Ground Trust for recreational purposes by the public at large but particularly the people of Bath and surrounding areas.

About a quarter of the Rec is leased to Bath Rugby during the rugby union season as a sports ground capable of holding 14,500 people. During the summer the rugby ground's temporary East Stand is removed to make way for cricket on a larger pitch. This cricket pitch is used for local contests and was used by Somerset County Cricket Club until 2011. Parts of the eastern area of the Rec are used by Bath Hockey Club, Bath Croquet Club, Bath Drama Club, Bath Quidditch Club and for some tennis courts. Pitches are available for amateur sports such as Football, Volleyball and Lacrosse. There is a cricket pavilion at the William Street entrance to the ground. The council-run Sports and Leisure Centre is located on the southern edge of the Rec, accessed via North Parade.

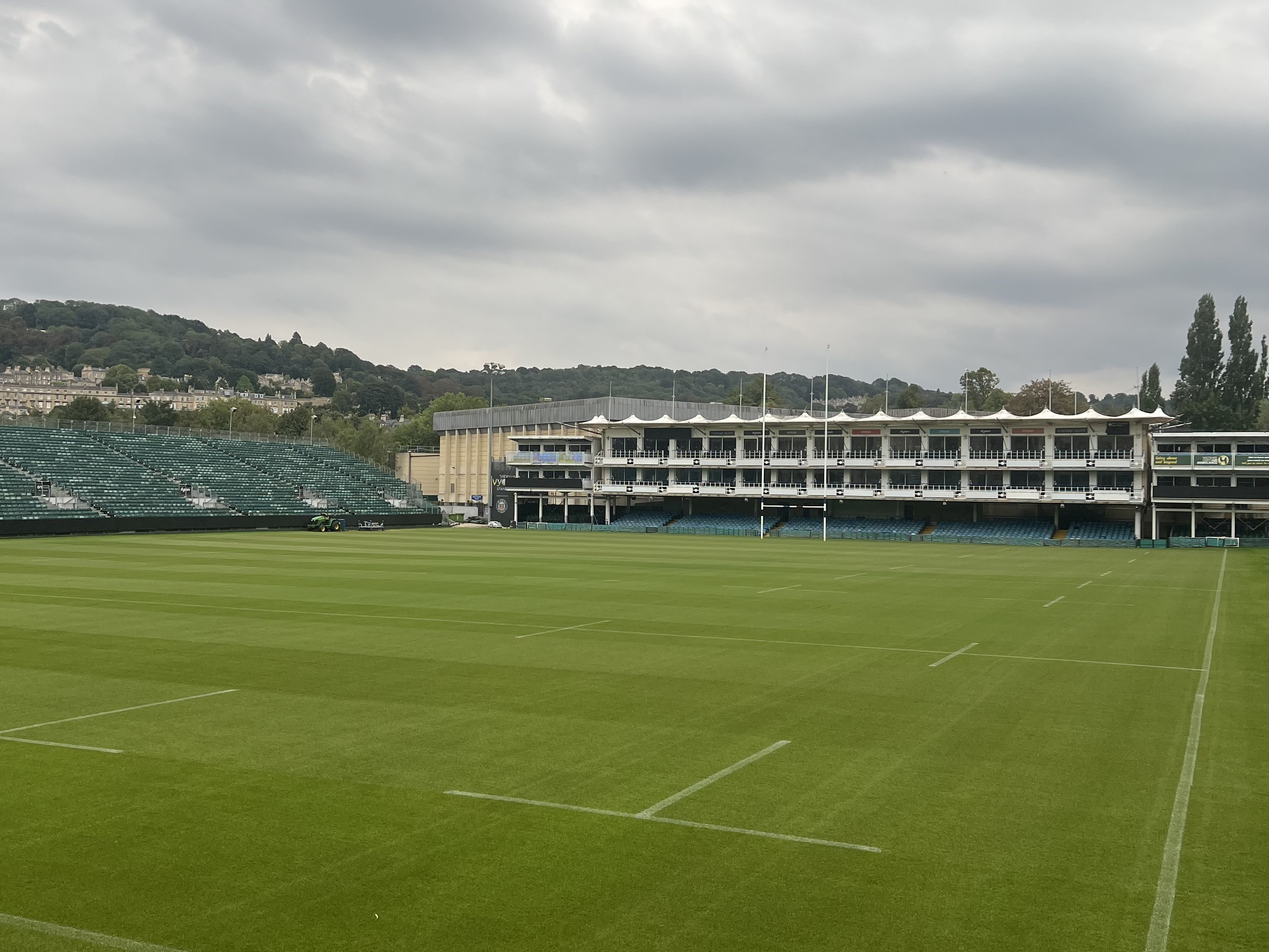
The Rec in 2025

In former years the Rec was subject to periodic flooding from the River Avon, but a flood alleviation scheme in the 1960s improved the flow of the river. However, the Rec remains part of the floodplain at risk of occasional flooding. The ground can still get very boggy after heavy rains.

== History ==
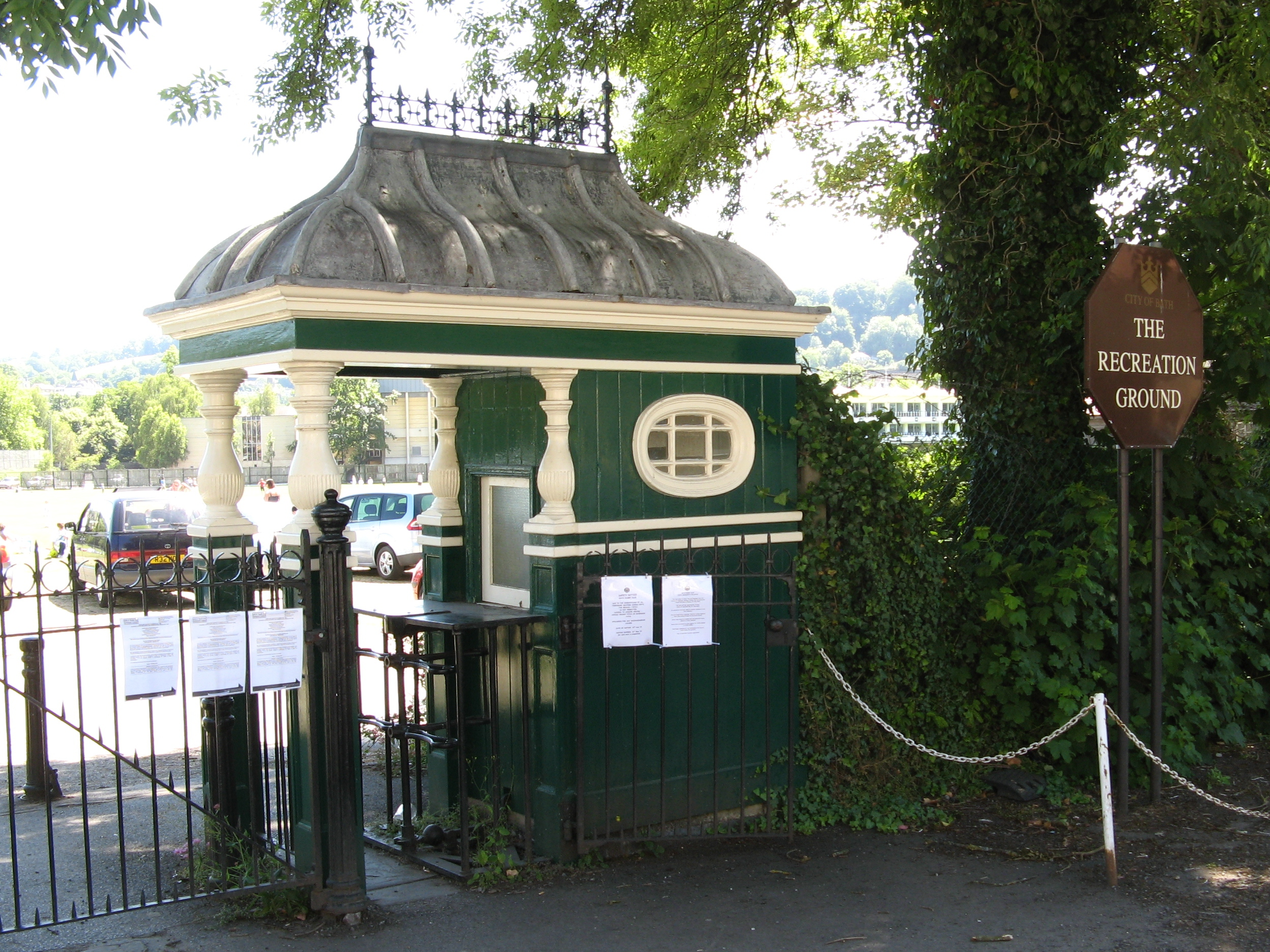
A now unused turnstile and kiosk at the William Street entrance, a Grade II listed building, built circa 1930

In the early part of the 1890s, the land on which the Recreation Ground now lies as well as the North Parade land were part of the Bathwick Estate, which was owned by the Forester family. In 1894, a lease was granted to the Directors of The Bath and County Recreation Ground Company Limited by Captain G W Forester. This lease allowed work to be carried out on the land which would make it suitable for cricket matches, lawn tennis and archery tournaments, football matches and all other outdoor sports. As part of this work, a cricket pavilion was started on the north side of the ground. The first Bath rugby matches were also played on the ground in 1894. Three years later, the ground hosted its maiden first-class cricket match, with Somerset County Cricket Club hosting the Gentlemen of Philadelphia as part of the Bath Cricket Festival. The company's lease was extended for a further 21 years in 1908, at a rent of £100 per year. Fourteen years later, the land was conveyed to The Bath and County Recreation Ground Company Limited for £6,050. The company then conveyed the North Parade Land, including a building which was used as an ice skating rink, to Bath Artcraft Limited for £2,500.

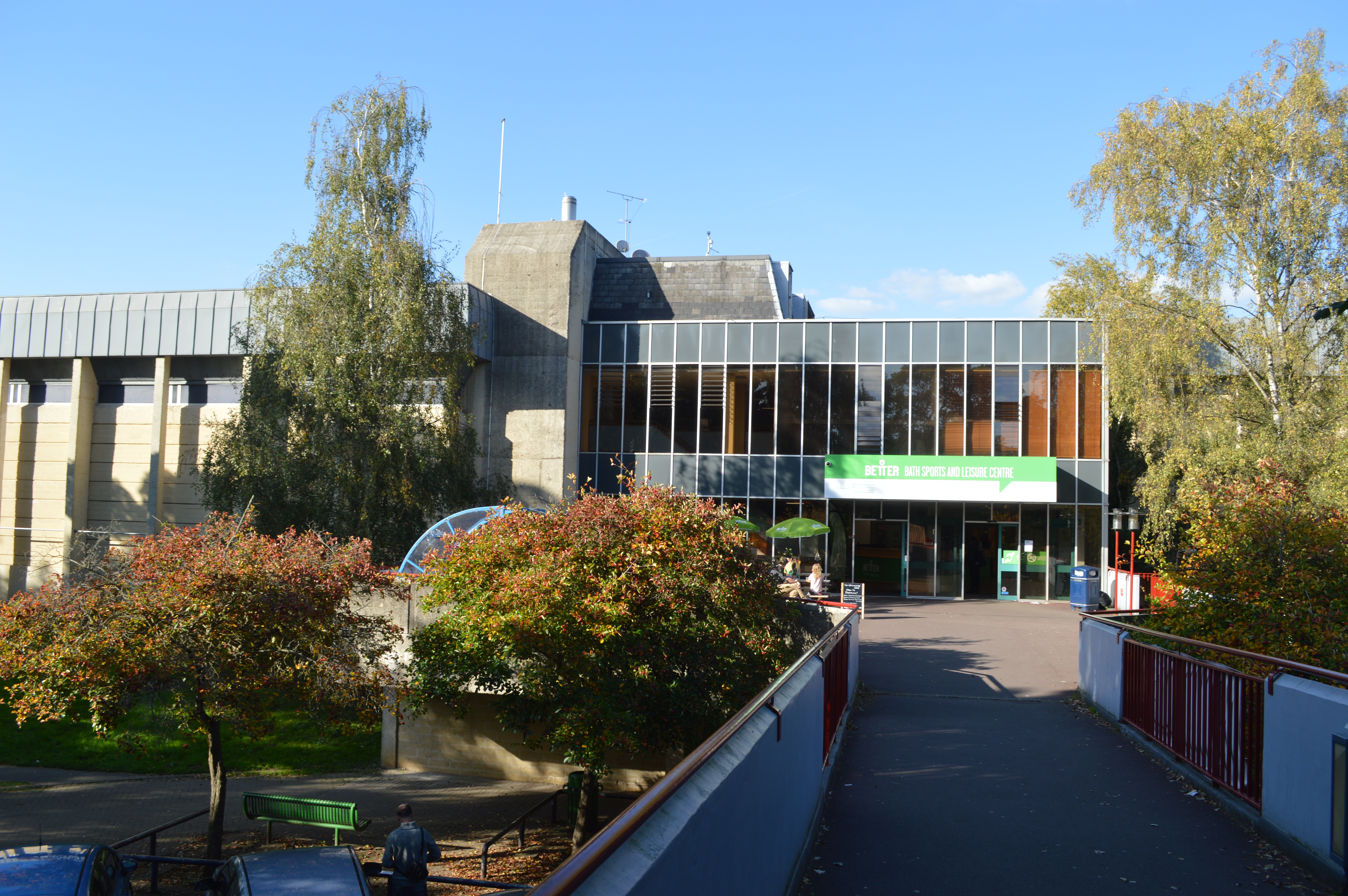
Bath Sports and Leisure Centre

A new lease was granted to Bath F.C. in 1927, allowing them the use of the land on the west side of ground, along with a Grand Stand, a New (North) Stand and a Pavilion, for a term of 25 years. Six years later the lease was surrendered, and a new 50-year lease was granted. In the same year, the Grand Stand was replaced with a new West Stand. This was significantly bomb-damaged during the Second World War. Rebuilding of the stand, at a cost in excess of £12,000, was met by the War Damage Commission in 1953–54. The 'Club Room' building was erected in 1954, to the west of the North Stand, and during the same year a lease was granted to allow a tennis club to use the north east corner of the ground. In 1956, the ground was conveyed to the Mayor Aldermen and the Citizens of the City of Bath (the corporation) for £11,155.

The Bath Festival of Blues was held at the ground, on 28 June 1969, with bands including Fleetwood Mac and Led Zeppelin performing.

Bath F.C. surrendered their 1933 lease, and were granted a new 75-year lease in 1973. In 1974, both the Recreation Ground and the North Parade Land were transferred to Bath City Council, who erected a Sports and Leisure Centre on the south side in 1975. In 1995, Bath F.C. were granted a further 75-year lease. Doubts over the legal effect of the 1956 Conveyance were settled in 2002, when the High Court declared the land a charitable trust, with the council as the sole Trustee. Following this decision, the Charity Commission raised issues over the use of the land, questioning the leisure centre's compliance with the use of the land for "open air recreation", and the dominant use of the ground by Bath Rugby to the perceived detriment of wider uses.

On 16 July 2006, Irish vocal pop band Westlife held a concert for their Face to Face Tour supporting their album Face to Face.

== Charitable trust status ==
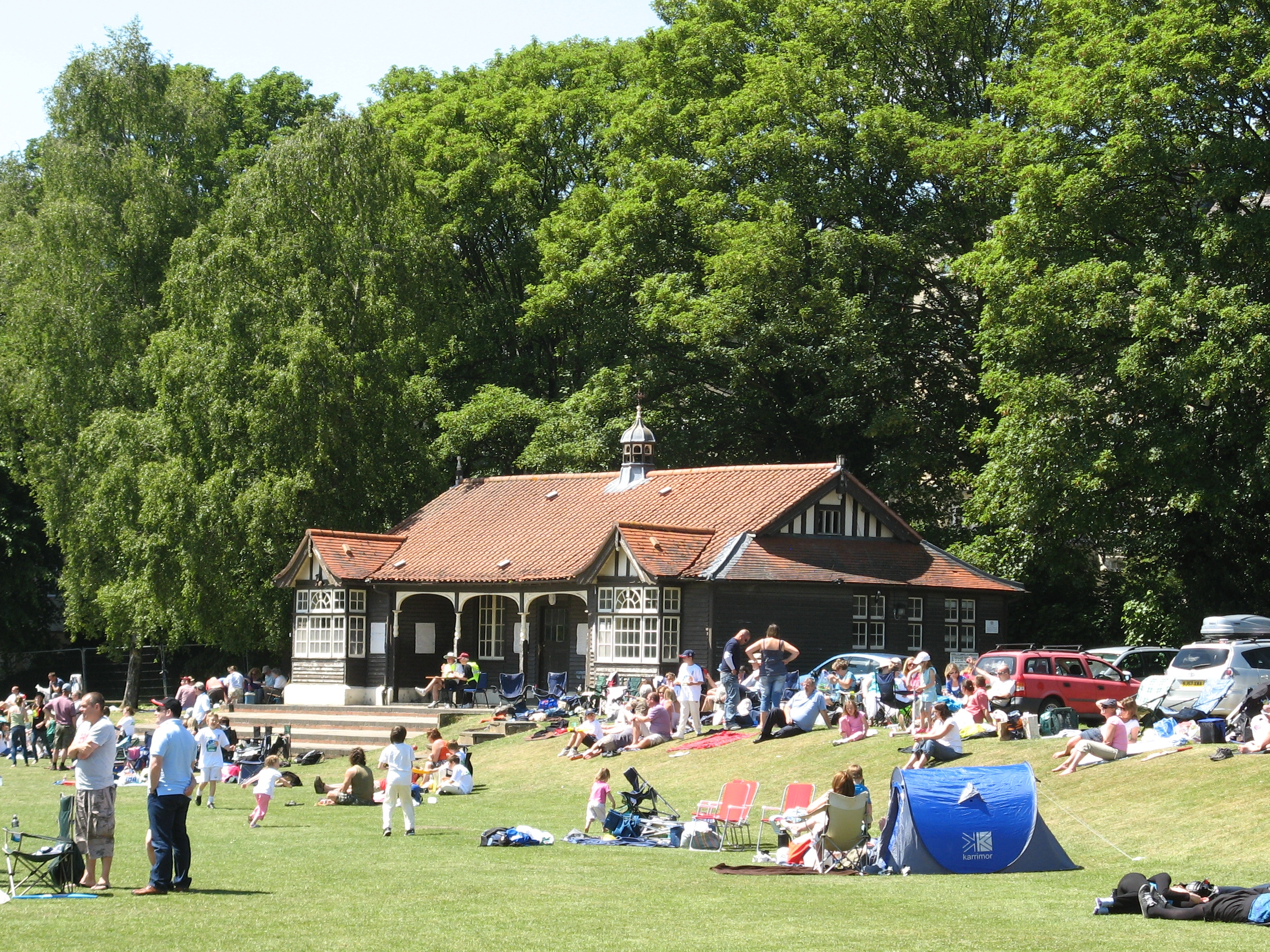
Cricket pavilion on a children's cricket day

The Rec was operated by Bath and North East Somerset Council but since 2015 has been owned and operated by The Recreation Ground Trust. The exact legal status was unclear until July 2002, when the High Court determined that the Rec was held on charitable trusts and the council, as sole Trustee, was charged with maintaining the Rec as an "open space" and "as a recreational facility available for the benefit of the public at large." The terms of the trust specify the Rec should be used for "games and sports of all kinds, tournaments, fetes, shows, exhibitions, displays, amusements, entertainments, or other activities of a like character" and there be no "undue preference to or in favour of any particular game or sport". The trust registered as a charity in November 2002.

Land usage of the Rec in 2007
Open Space	41%
Rugby Club (in season)	27%
Council Sports and Leisure Centre	17%
Croquet Club	9%
Tennis Clubs	5%
Drama Club	1%

As a result of the court's determination, Bath Rugby's use of the Rec for professional rugby appeared to be inconsistent with the trusts of the Charity. Since then the Charity Commission has made annual orders authorising the charity to continue the lease to the rugby club of additional land required for premiership rugby while a permanent solution is sought. Bath Rugby hold a long running lease to the ground of the old "Flowerpot Stand", but this is not sufficient for professional rugby.

In 1975 Bath City Council, the predecessor council, had built a Sports and Leisure Centre and car park on the south side of the Rec after taking legal advice that this was consistent with the trust obligations. However following the 2002 High Court determination, the Charity Commission decided this was a breach of trust by the council as Trustee. In 2005 the council renewed Bath Rugby's temporary lease without the necessary prior consent from the Charity Commission. Consequently, in February 2007 the Charity Commission made a protective order vesting the Rec in entirety to the Official Custodian for Charities while the council conducts a delayed strategic review, and new plans are agreed and implemented.

The Rec was conveyed for a sum of £11,155 to the City of Bath Corporation in 1956 by the Bath and County Recreation Ground Company, when the company recognised that it could no longer profitably run the Rec. The Rec was transferred under various conditions that created the Charitable Trust status. Additionally earlier conditions from the 1922 transfer from Francis William Forester to the company, preventing any building on the Rec for trade or business that could disturb the neighbourhood, were passed onto the Trust. The company had been formed in 1894, but only obtained full ownership of the Rec in 1922.

The Trust formed in 2002 is now called the Bath Recreation Limited and is limited by guarantee and registered at Companies House in April 2017.

== The battle to keep Bath Rugby at the Recreation Ground ==
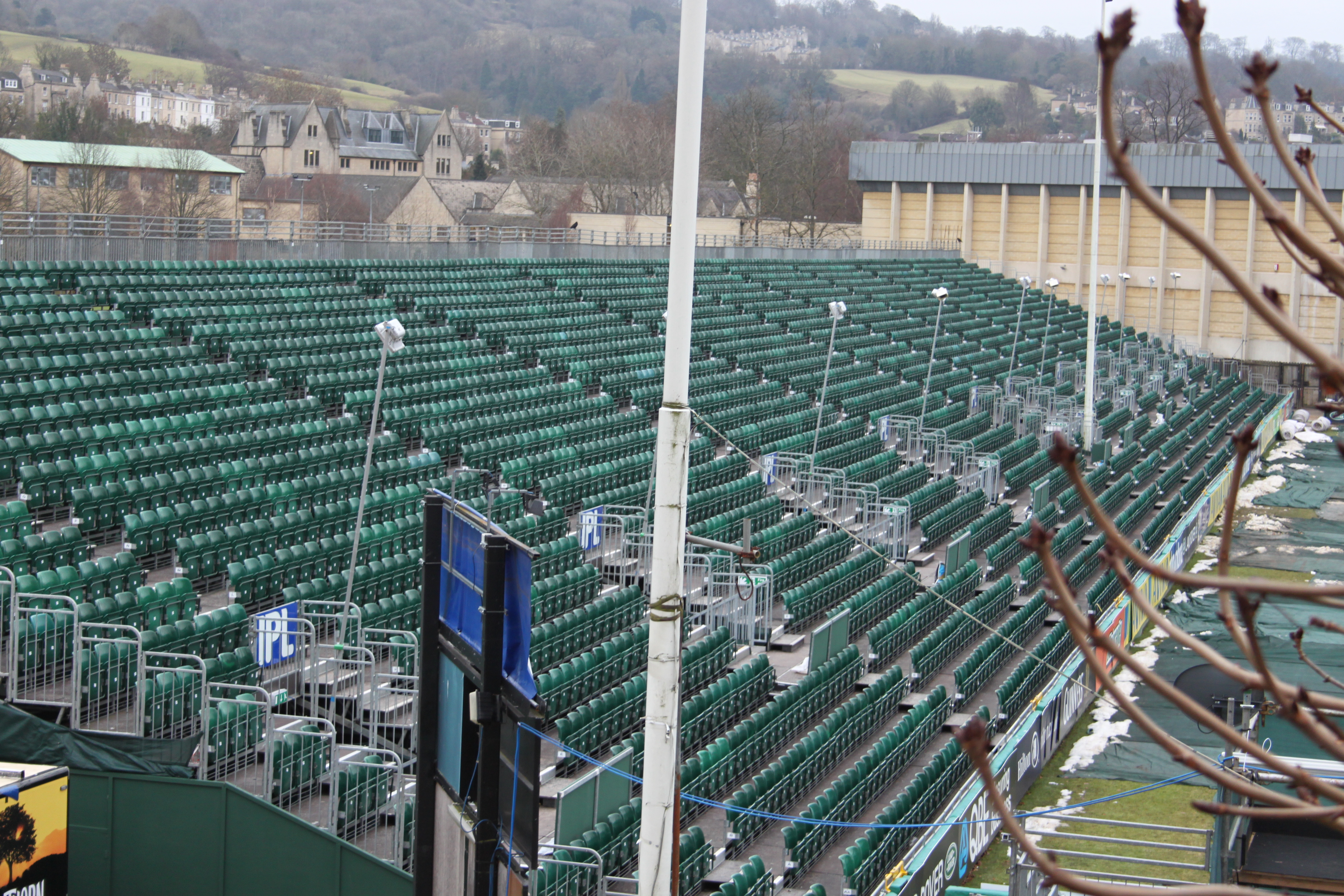
Temporary seating

In 2006 the Rugby Football Union (RFU) stated that by 2010 all Premiership rugby clubs would need a spectator capacity of at least 15,000, at a time when the Rec's capacity was 10,300. However, the Professional Game Board reduced the minimum capacity required to 10,000 and this is still the criterion used.

In March 2007 the council trustee of the Rec received a strategic review showing support for the development of the ground by 64% of respondents to a poll (44% supporting development on the current site of the ground). The council trustee wished to proceed with a development proposal that would allow Bath Rugby Club to lease additional land, to permit the provision of a larger rugby ground. The Charity Commission responded that for any such development to proceed they would need to be fully satisfied that any detriment arising to the Rec's charitable objectives from the proposal would be significantly outweighed by benefits.

Various detailed development proposals were made, but these could not satisfy the Charity Commission's legal need to protect the Rec's charitable objectives.

In June 2009 the Charity Commission again granted permission for the club to continue to use temporary spectator seating on charity land for the 2009/2010 season which together with changes to other seating allowed capacity to increase to 11,700.

In November 2009 the new chief executive of Bath Rugby, Nick Blofeld, stated the club was seeking a mostly seated stadium for 20,000, with potential for future expansion, containing "restaurants and cafés, hospitality suites, conference facilities and good food and beverage outlets and other potential retail outlets." The club no longer ruled out other sites within Bath, and was considering the option of moving to the Western Riverside Development. However, by November 2010 the club had virtually ruled out alternative sites in Bath after detailed investigations, preferring to stay at the Rec, with Somerdale, Keynsham as a distant second choice.

In July 2010 the Charity Commission again granted permission for the club to continue to use temporary spectator seating on charity land for the 2010/2011 season which together with changes to other seating allowed capacity to increase to 12,300.

In December 2010 the Trustees of the Recreation Ground announced that the Charity Commission "have stated that they believe that the Trust is at a point where it is ready to apply for a new scheme which must be done by 31st March 2011". They also made clear that consultations should take place with the beneficiaries. In January 2011 the trust delayed the consultation because of "unexpected details that need to be resolved". Negotiations about a possible land swap with Bath Rugby's training facilities at Lambridge are taking place.

The Recreation Ground Trustees held a meeting on 13 April 2011 and agreed to launch the consultation document proposing to put forward a Scheme to the Charity Commission. The scheme consulted on was to swap the Bath Rugby Lambridge training ground for the Rugby Ground at the Rec and to allow the Leisure Centre to remain on open space land.

On 7 July 2011 the Trustees announced the results of the consultation in that 4,000 + responses had been received and 86% were in favour of the land swap to correct the abuse of the usage of the Rugby Club and to change the objects of the Trust to allow the Leisure Centre to remain on open space.

It was announced in the Western Daily Press on 17 August 2012 that "The Charity Commission has agreed in principle to the plans for a land-swap deal, which would allow the club to expand its presence on the city centre site in exchange for its training ground at Lambridge effectively becoming publicly owned."

On 30 November 2012 the Charity Commission published a draft Scheme to correct the two errors in the use of the charitable land. The Leisure Centre use is corrected by the change in the objects of the Charity to allow indoor activities. The use by the rugby ground is to be corrected by a land swap with land nearly double the size of the Rec rugby ground. The Charity Commission invited representations to their draft scheme within 28 days.

In February 2013 the Charity Commission stated that they had received 1,868 representations of which 244 objected to the Scheme allowing the land swap. The Charity Commission stated that they needed to study all the representations before a final decision was expected in April 2013. In opposition to the scheme, local resident Jack Sparrow lodged an application to have the Recreation Ground declared a Town Green. The council received 7 objections and 18 representations for the proposal. On Friday 15 November 2013, Bath and North East Somerset Council's Regulatory (Access) Committee resolved to refuse the Application to register Bath Recreation Ground as a Town or Village Green pursuant to section 15 of the Commons Act 2006.

On 12 June 2013 it was announced by David Dixon, the Chairman of the Recreation Ground Trust, that the Charity Commission had agreed the "land swap" by a scheme allowing the Rugby Club to develop the rugby ground on the Rec and that the Trust will have use of land previously used for training by the Rugby Club at Lambridge for charitable use. The Scheme made by the Charity Commission and the decision document from the Reviewing Officer of the Charity Commission.

On 27 March 2014 three appeal judges of The First-Tier Tribunal (Charity) allowed the Scheme with amendments. As regards the Rugby Club they were limited to the actual footprint they currently use. This is smaller than they wanted but still could be enough for a 16k arena development. The club has stated that they will press on with their plans. The Judgement in full. The new Trustee Board of the Recreation Ground Trust (RGT) agreed at their meeting on 7 April 2014 to appeal the judgement. The plans to temporarily increase the capacity of the Rec by nearly 2,000 seats and upgrade the facilities ahead of Bath Rugby's 150th anniversary, were approved on 30 July 2014.

On 30 July 2015 the Trustee Board was successful in their appeal to the Upper Tribunal in a case held at the Royal Courts of Justice on 18 May 2015. In essence this judgement allows the Trustees to manage the Recreation Ground for the public at large in a manner that will further its charitable objects. The full judgement can be read here

The Lower Tribunal were tasked to revise the scheme which was agreed on 14 December 2016. In essence the new scheme is as follows:

- The Trust must provide for the Rec to be used for "outdoor recreational facilities for the benefit of the public"
- The Trust should ensure it is principally used for "games and sports of all kinds" but not show undue preference in favour of any particular game, sport, person, club, body or organisation
- The Trust shall not use the Rec otherwise than as an open space, but it does not have to be kept in its present form
- As "absolute owner", the Trust can sell, lease, license or otherwise dispose of all or any part of the Rec
- The Trust can exchange or swap all or any part of the Rec for replacement land in or near Bath
- When the leisure centre is no longer fit for purpose it must be demolished
- Changes to some aspects of the scheme can be made by the Trust, but only if at least 75 per cent of trustees who are then in office and eligible to vote, vote in favour.

In October 2020 a High Court Judge in the Chancery Division declared that the 1922 restrictive covenant on the land known as the Recreation Ground was enforceable by the owners of properties in the neighbourhood whose homes were owned by Captain Forester in 1922. This means basically, that nothing can be built on the Recreation Ground that can cause a nuisance to the neighbours. Bath Rugby and Bath Recreation Limited have been granted the right to appeal against the covenant and this is due to be heard in autumn 2021.

On 21 December 2021 the Appeal Court judgement was published. The above judgement in October 2020 came to the conclusion that any 1 of the 8 defendants could enforce the restrictive covenant. The court of appeal disagreed, deciding instead that there must be a ‘sufficient indication’ of the land intended under the covenant. They stated that the words ‘adjoining land or the neighbourhood’ were neither sufficient, nor could they be construed in the artificial way that the Judge above had done. The full judgement This is a significant step and the Rugby Club can now pursue the development subject to planning permission but knowing that no legal challenge other than planning can be made.

Commenting on the ruling Bath Rugby CEO, Tarquin MacDonald stated:

"We are delighted with the ruling and can now focus on bringing forward revised proposals for a new stadium. This is important for the club and the city. Redevelopment will create new jobs, boost visitor spends, enhance the river frontage and help to provide education and support opportunities for young people who need it most."

On 18 October 2022 An application for leave to appeal the above ruling was refused by the Supreme Court which brings to an end the legal battle over the Rugby Club redeveloping on the Recreation Ground. The Club can now work on its plans and submit an application to Planning.

September 2025 The Battle for the Recreation Ground is over. In the Strategic Report of the Club’s 2025 Accounts it was stated that:

”An historic milestone was achieved in September 2025 when Bath&North East Somerset Council's Planning Committee voted overwhelmingly in favour of the club's planning application for a new stadium at The Rec, with the Secretary of State subsequently reviewing the decision before confirming the application would not be called in. The new 18,000seat stadium will create world-class facilities, regenerate the riverside in Bath, elevate the fan experience and strengthen the club's connection to the city, whilst also enabling the long-term financial sustainability of the club.”

== Real Friends of the Rec ==
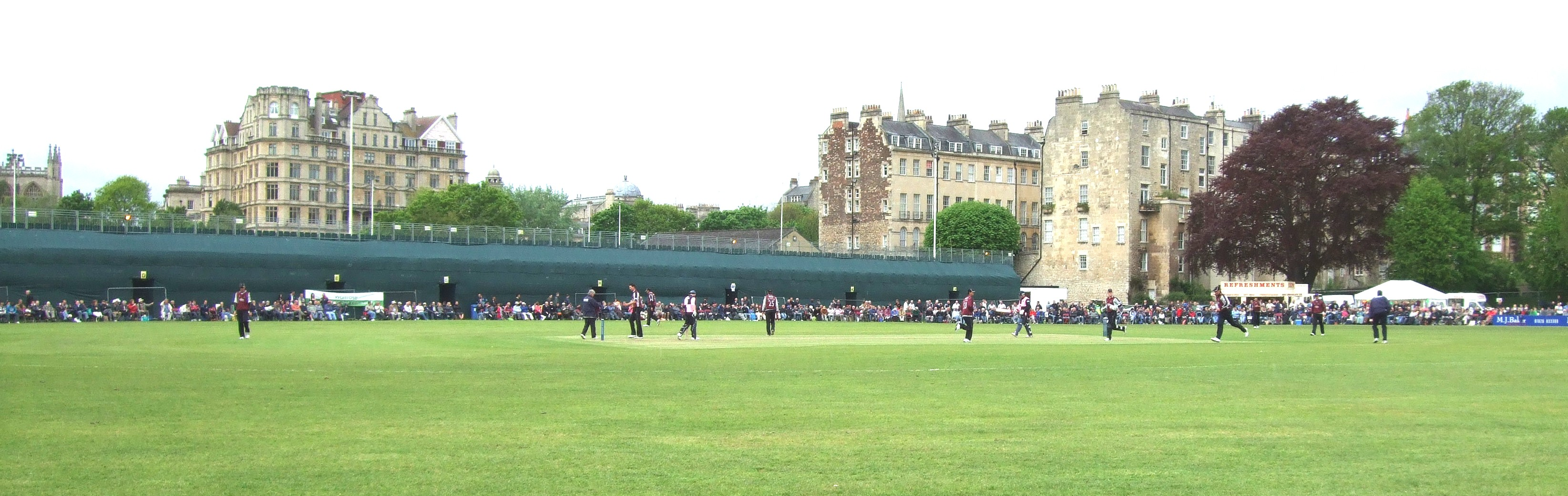
Somerset County Cricket Club playing a Friends Provident Trophy 50-over match against Middlesex in 2009

A local interest group called the Real Friends of the Rec was formed in December 2008 to lobby for the building of an all purpose sports and cultural arena at the Rec. They hope to encourage Somerset County Cricket Club and other spectator sports to utilise a new stadium throughout the year, which would increase income and year-round usage.

The land swap concept had been supported by the Real Friends of the Rec since the idea was raised at the inaugural meeting of the group in January 2009.

== Friends of Bath Recreation Ground ==
The Friends of Bath Recreation Ground is a separate group of residents local to the Recreation Ground, that holds the view that the Rec should not be used for professional sport, and that the council's actions in this matter have been dubious for many years. They threaten to take legal action should the Trust, Bath Rugby and the Charity Commission reach an agreement to allow development on the Rec.

In September 2023, a planning application was submitted for an 18,000 seat rugby stadium with ancillary conference, function and banqueting space. Friends of the Rec raised concerns that the height and scale of this construction would destroy some iconic views of Bath's townscape enjoyed by local residents and many tourists, thus threatening the status of Bath as the only UNESCO Heritage town or city in England. This view was covered in the Nooks and Crannies section of satire and current affairs magazine Private Eye.

Bath & North East Somerset Planning Committee passed the Development of the new 18,000 seater stadium in September 2025 and the Secretary of State reviewed the decision and decided it would not be called in.
