= Henry Huggins (cricketer) =

English cricketer (1877–1942)

Personal information
- Full name: Henry James Huggins
- Born: 15 March 1877; Headington, Oxfordshire, England
- Died: 20 November 1942 (aged 65); Stroud, Gloucestershire, England
- Batting: Right-handed
- Bowling: Right-arm fast-medium

Domestic team information
- Years: Team
- 1901–1921: Gloucestershire

Career statistics
| Competition | First-class |
|---|---|
| Matches | 200 |
| Runs scored | 4,375 |
| Batting average | 14.43 |
| 100s/50s | 0/10 |
| Top score | 92 |
| Balls bowled | 37,154 |
| Wickets | 584 |
| Bowling average | 29.03 |
| 5 wickets in innings | 24 |
| 10 wickets in match | 5 |
| Best bowling | 9/34 |
| Catches/stumpings | 47/– |
- Source: Cricinfo, 22 November 2023

Henry Huggins (15 March 1877 – 20 November 1942) was an English cricketer. He played for Gloucestershire between 1901 and 1921.
