= George Carver (academic) =

American academic

George Carver (December 19, 1888 – October 29, 1949) was an American professor and author.

== Biography ==
Carver was born in Cincinnati, Ohio, on December 19, 1888.

In 1916, he received a Bachelor of Arts degree from Miami University. He worked as instructor in English at Pennsylvania State College from 1916 to 1918, then joined the Army in World War I, serving in the infantry. In 1919 he married Eva Gertrude Schultz; the couple had one son. From 1919 to 1924 he taught at the University of Iowa. Next he went to the University of Pittsburgh as assistant professor, becoming associate in 1927 and in 1931 professor of English.

He died on October 29, 1949, in Pittsburgh, Pennsylvania.

== Legacy ==
Carver was a member of several social organizations, including the Polygon Club, the Junta, Sons of the American Revolution, The Midland, Phi Beta Kappa, and Phi Kappa Sigma.

Saint Vincent College awarded him an Honorary Doctor of Letters degree.

== See also ==
- William Marion Reedy

== Works ==
- (1923). Writing and Rewriting (with William Shipman Maulsby and Thomas A. Knott).
- (1924). Minimum Essentials of Correct Writing (with Millington Farwell Carpenter, William Shipman Maulsby, and Thomas A. Knott).
- (1928). Points of Style: A Minimum of Correctness in Writing English Prose.
- (1929). A Series of Six Radio Talks on Essays and Essayists (with suggested readings).
- (1931). Elements of English Composition: A Handbook with Tests and Worksheets.
- (1932). Paragraph Design (with Frederick Phillip Mayer).
- (1938). Index to Sentence Essentials.
- (1941). Communicating Experience.
- (1948). Not With Eyes Only.
- (1948). Alms for Oblivion: Books, Men and Biography.

=== Other ===
- (1926). The Catholic Tradition in English Literature (editor).
- (1926). Representative Catholic Essays (editor, with Ellen Geyer).
- (1930). Periodical Essays of the 18th Century (editor).
- (1930). The Stream of English Literature (editor, with Sister Mary Eleanore and Katherine Brégy).
