= 2000 NatWest Trophy =

Last Natwest trophy

- Administrator: England and Wales Cricket Board
- Cricket format: Limited overs cricket (50 overs per innings)
- Tournament format: Knockout
- Champions: Gloucestershire (3rd title)
- Participants: 60
- Matches: 60 (including replay)
- Most runs: 304 Kim Barnett (Gloucestershire)
- Most wickets: 12 Stephen Foster (Northumberland)

The 2000 NatWest Trophy was the 20th and last NatWest Trophy before being renamed as the Cheltenham & Gloucester Trophy for the 2001 season. It was an English limited overs county cricket tournament which was held between 2 May and 26 August 2000. The tournament was won by Gloucestershire who defeated Warwickshire by 22 runs in the final at Lord's.

== Format ==
The 18 first-class counties, were joined by all twenty Minor Counties, plus Huntingdonshire. They were also joined by the cricket boards of Derbyshire, Durham, Essex, Gloucestershire, Hampshire, Kent, Lancashire, Leicestershire, Middlesex, Northamptonshire, Nottinghamshire, Somerset, Surrey, Sussex, Warwickshire, Worcestershire and Yorkshire. The national teams of Denmark, Ireland, the Netherlands and Scotland once again took part in the tournament.

The tournament was a knockout with four rounds before the quarter-final and semi-final stages. The winners of the semi-finals went on to the final at Lord's which was held on 26 August 2000.

=== First round ===
2 May 2000
(scorecard)

Cheshire; 204 all out (50 overs)	v	Lincolnshire; 204/9 (50 overs)
Ian Cockbain 65; Robert Chapman 3/34 (9 overs)		Steve Plumb 48; Christopher Finegan 3/31 (10 overs)

Lincolnshire won by losing fewer wickets
Boughton Hall Cricket Club Ground, Chester
Umpires: Paddy O'Hara & Graham Watkins
Player of the match: Robert Chapman (Lincolnshire)

2 May 2000
(scorecard)

Cornwall; 170/6 (50 overs)	v	Norfolk; 171/6 (47.5 overs)
Steven Pope 56; Steve Goldsmith 3/34 (10 overs)		Carl Rogers 83*; Jonathan Kent 3/21 (8 overs)

Norfolk won by 4 wickets
Boscawen Park, Truro
Umpires: Brian Bennett & Peter Kingston-Davey
Player of the match: Carl Rogers (Norfolk)

2 May 2000
(scorecard)

Leicestershire Cricket Board; 192/9 (50 overs)	v	Durham Cricket Board; 195/7 (49.5 overs)
Ashley Wright 112; Steven Chapman 3/39 (7 overs)		Steven Chapman 64; Neil Pullen 3/25 (8.5 overs)

Durham Cricket Board won by 3 wickets
Eastwood Gardens, Gateshead
Umpires: Don Norton & John Thallon
Player of the match: Ashley Wright (Leicestershire Cricket Board)

2 May 2000
(scorecard)

Nottinghamshire Cricket Board; 125/9 (50 overs)	v	Gloucestershire Cricket Board; 126/2 (28.5 overs)
Stephen Brogan 33; Alastair Bressington 3/21 (10 overs)		Imraan Mohammad 53; Simon Shipp 1/17 (5 overs)

Gloucestershire Cricket Board won by 8 wickets
The Victoria Ground, Cheltenham
Umpires: Gordon Ripley & Ross Wood
Player of the match: Imraan Mohammad (Gloucestershire Cricket Board)

2 May 2000
(scorecard)

Huntingdonshire; 148/8 (50 overs)	v	Hampshire Cricket Board; 120 all out (46 overs)
Martin Burton 28 (78); Christopher Yates 3/17 (8 overs)		Ross Hunter 33; Billy Young 3/22 (10 overs)

Huntingdonshire won by 28 runs
Grasmere Road Ground, Cove
Umpires: David Burden & Johan Luther
Player of the match: Billy Young (Huntingdonshire)

2 May 2000
(scorecard)

Sussex Cricket Board; 215/7 (50 overs)	v	Herefordshire; 209/9 (50 overs)
Kashif Ibrahim 63 (81); Nathan Round 2/28 (5 overs)		Ismail Dawood 39 (74); Dominic Clapp 3/46 (6 overs)

Sussex Cricket Board won by 6 runs
Stowe Lane, Colwall
Umpires: Michael Moran & Wyn Morgan
Player of the match: Kashif Ibrahim (Sussex Cricket Board)

2 May 2000
(scorecard)

Hertfordshire; 114 all out (47.1 overs)	v	Cambridgeshire; 115/6 (46 overs)
Kafeel Jahangir 30; Alistair Tapp 3/17 (8 overs)		Simon Kellett 42; Justin Engelke 3/8 (10 overs)

Cambridgeshire won by 4 wickets
Digswell Park, Welwyn Garden City
Umpires: Charlie Puckett & John Reed
Player of the match: Mark Mason (Cambridgeshire)

2 May 2000
(scorecard)

Northamptonshire Cricket Board; 173/8 (50 overs)	v	Northumberland; 175/4 (48.2 overs)
Richard Falkner 46; Stephen Foster 3/23 (10 overs)		Adam Heather 79; Ross McLean 1/21 (10 overs)

Northumberland won by 6 wickets
County Ground, Northampton
Umpires: Peter Clubb & Keith Coburn
Player of the match: Adam Heather (Northumberland)

2 May 2000
(scorecard)

Somerset Cricket Board; 124 all out (45.4 overs)	v	Staffordshire; 127/3 (29 overs)
Wes Durston 25; David Follett 3/10 (8 overs)		Laurie Potter 37; Mathew Dimond 1/7 (6.1 overs)

Staffordshire won by 7 wickets
Gorway Ground, Walsall
Umpires: C.J. Pickett & Trevor Riley
Player of the match: Laurie Potter (Staffordshire)

2 May 2000
(scorecard)

Suffolk; 145 all out (49.4overs)	v	Lancashire Cricket Board; 146/6 (38.2 overs)
Chris Seal 34; Stephen Dearden 4/31 (10 overs)		Paul Green 27*; Ian Graham 3/25 (10 overs)

Lancashire Cricket Board won by 4 wickets
Wamil Way, Mildenhall
Umpires: John Ilott & John Tythcott
Player of the match: Stephen Dearden (Lancashire Cricket Board)

2 May 2000
(scorecard)

Wales Minor Counties; 212/6 (50 overs)	v	Buckinghamshire; 201/9 (50 overs)
Phil Simmons 82; Keith Arthurton 3/46 (10 overs)		Keith Arthurton 48; Steve Barwick 2/37 (10 overs)

Wales Minor Counties won by 11 runs
Pontarddulais Park, Pontarddulais
Umpires: John James & Michael Johnson
Player of the match: Phil Simmons (Wales Minor Counties)

2 May 2000
(scorecard)

Scotland; 93 all out (29.5 overs)	v	Wiltshire; 94/3 (31.1 overs)
Craig Wright 25; Kevin Nash 3/10 (7 overs)		Dwain Winter 37*; James Brinkley 2/13 (10 overs)

Wiltshire won by 7 wickets
Salisbury and South Wiltshire Sports Club, Salisbury
Umpires: Alan Bundy & John Hardy
Player of the match: James Taylor (Wiltshire)

2 May 2000
(scorecard)

Kent Cricket Board; 239/9 (50 overs)	v	Worcestershire Cricket Board; 189 all out (44.2 overs)
John Bowden 98; Kabir Ali 2/52 (10 overs)		James Pipe 56; Eddie Stanford 3/38 (5 overs)

Kent Cricket Board won by 50 runs
Chester Road North Ground, Kidderminster
Umpires: Steve Johnson & Bill Smith
Player of the match: John Bowden (Kent Cricket Board)

2 May 2000
(scorecard)

Ireland; 140 all out (44.3 overs)	v	Shropshire; 141/5 (49 overs)
Angus Dunlop 56; Adam Byram 4/24 (10 overs)		Tony Parton 51*; Derek Heasley 2/34 (8 overs)

Shropshire won by 5 wickets
Castle Avenue, Dublin
Umpires: Michael Dixon & Tommy Wilson
Player of the match: Adam Byram (Shropshire)

=== Second round ===
16 May 2000
(scorecard)

Cambridgeshire; 123 all out (45.1 overs)	v	Cumberland; 126/1 (32.2 overs)
Nigel Gadsby 42; David Pennett 4/20 (10 overs)		Ashley Metcalfe 51*; Timothy Smith 1/26 (8 overs)

Cumberland won by 9 wickets
The Avenue Sports Club Ground, March
Umpires: Robert Eagleton & John Tythcott
Player of the match: Marcus Sharp (Cumberland)

16 May 2000
(scorecard)

Derbyshire Cricket Board; 222/8 (50 overs)	v	Gloucestershire Cricket Board; 172 all out (43.3 overs)
Adrian Marsh 53; Andrew Edwards 3/38 (10 overs)		Christopher Budd 52; Ian Darlington 3/19 (4.3 overs)

Derbyshire Cricket Board won by 50 runs
Town Ground, Heanor
Umpires: Peter Clubb & Trevor Riley
Player of the match: Adrian Marsh (Derbyshire Cricket Board)

16 May 2000
(scorecard)

Devon; 238 all out (49.5 overs)	v	Staffordshire; 46 all out (20.5 overs)
Robert Dawson 61; Laurie Potter 4/9 (10 overs)		David Boden 12*; Mathew Theedom 5/18 (7 overs)

Devon won by 192 runs
Recreation Ground, Torquay
Umpires: Guy Randall-Johnson & Gordon Ripley
Player of the match: Mathew Theedom (Devon)

16 May 2000
(scorecard)

Dorset; 181/8 (50 overs)	v	Norfolk; 71 all out (33.2 overs)
Andrew Sexton 34; Steve Goldsmith 2/17 (10 overs)		Stephen Livermore 22; Vyvian Pike 5/10 (10 overs)

Dorset won by 110 runs
Dean Park Cricket Ground, Bournemouth
Umpires: John Hardy & Bob Sutton
Player of the match: Vyvian Pike (Dorset)

16 May 2000
(scorecard)

Denmark; 218 all out (50 overs)	v	Durham Cricket Board; 223/5 (38.3 overs)
Aftab Ahmed 94; Stephen Ball 3/45 (9 overs)		Marcus North 69*; Thomas Hansen 2/32 (10 overs)

Durham Cricket Board won by 5 wickets
Park Drive, Hartlepool
Umpires: Mick McLean & Colin Megennis
Player of the match: Marcus North (Durham Cricket Board)

16 May 2000
(scorecard)

Essex Cricket Board; 266 all out (50 overs)	v	Lancashire Cricket Board; 251/9 (50 overs)
Graham Napier 79; Stephen Dearden 3/50 (10 overs)		Neil Bannister 62; Andrew Churchill 2/48 (10 overs)

Essex Cricket Board won by 15 runs
County Ground, Chelmsford
Umpires: David Burden & Johan Luther
Player of the match: Graham Napier (Essex Cricket Board)

16 May 2000
(scorecard)

Huntingdonshire; 204/8 (50 overs)	v	Yorkshire Cricket Board; 207/5 (45 overs)
Vincent Winn 50 (111); Paul Booth 2/22 (10 overs)		Matthew Doidge 54 (58); Neil Rowlands 2/43 (10 overs)

Yorkshire Cricket won by 5 wickets
The Parks, Godmanchester
Umpires: R. Kemming & Charlie Puckett
Player of the match: Matthew Doidge (Yorkshire Cricket Board)

16 May 2000
(scorecard)

Lincolnshire; 210/8 (50 overs)	v	Netherlands; 115 all out (37.2 overs)
Peter Trend 52; Roland Lefebvre 4/37 (10 overs)		Klaas-Jan van Noortwijk 33; Steve Plumb 4/16 (7 overs)

Lincolnshire won by 105 runs
Gorse Lane, Grantham
Umpires: John Ilott & Paul Joy
Player of the match: Peter Trend (Lincolnshire)

16 May 2000
(scorecard)

Middlesex Cricket Board; 203/8 (50 overs)	v	Wiltshire; 200/9 (50 overs)
Rajesh Rao 49; Jason Searle 3/40 (10 overs)		James Taylor 49; Robin Jones 3/24 (4 overs)

Middlesex Cricket Board won by 3 runs
John Walker's Ground, Southgate
Umpires: Louis Hogan & John Reed
Player of the match: Alastair Fraser (Middlesex Cricket Board)

16 May 2000
(scorecard)

Bedfordshire; 164 all out (48 overs)	v	Northumberland; 167/3 (33.2 overs)
Jeremy Page 61; Stephen Foster 3/21 (9 overs)		Wayne Falla 64; Andrew Roberts 2/33 (10 overs)

Northumberland won by 7 wickets
Osborne Avenue, Jesmond
Umpires: Peter Brown & John Thallon
Player of the match: Stephen Foster (Northumberland)

16 May 2000
(scorecard)

Surrey Cricket Board; 233/9 (50 overs)	v	Shropshire; 239/4 (45 overs)
Zander de Bruyn 43; Kevin Evans 3/37 (10 overs)		Bryan Jones 76; Gareth Batty 2/42 (9.2 overs)

Shropshire won by 6 wickets
Shrewsbury Road, Shifnal
Umpires: Michael Dixon & Tommy Wilson
Player of the match: Bryan Jones (Shropshire)

16 May 2000
(scorecard)

Sussex Cricket Board; 206 all out (49.4 overs)	v	Berkshire; 207/5 (47.2 overs)
George Campbell 59; Charl Willoughby 2/27 (10 overs)		Lee Nurse 81; Kashif Ibrahim 2/35 (7.2 overs)

Berkshire won by 5 wickets
Horntye Park, Hastings
Umpires: Steve Bishopp & Phillip Burrows
Player of the match: Lee Nurse (Berkshire)

16 May 2000
(scorecard)

Oxfordshire; 120 all out (49.1 overs)	v	Wales Minor Counties; 122/2 (35.3 overs)
Robert Brooks 23; Steve Barwick 2/7 (9.1 overs)		Andrew Jones 43*; Keith Arnold 1/16 (10 overs)

Wales Minor Counties won by 8 wickets
Sophia Gardens, Cardiff
Umpires: Martin Brown & John James
Player of the match: Andrew Jones (Wales Minor Counties)

16 May 2000
(scorecard)

Kent Cricket Board; 208/8 (50 overs)	v	Warwickshire Cricket Board; 163 all out (47.3 overs)
Simon Williams 32; Jim Troughton 3/34 (10 overs)		Daniel Dalton 30; Eddie Stanford 3/29 (7 overs)

Kent Cricket Board won by 45 runs
Stratford-upon-Avon Cricket Club Ground, Stratford-upon-Avon
Umpires: Alan Bayley & Bill Smith
Player of the match: Simon Williams (Kent Cricket Board)

=== Third round ===
21 June 2000
(scorecard)

Durham; 140 all out (49.4 overs)	v	Berkshire; 97 all out (28.5 overs)
Simon Katich 40 (70); John Emburey 4/13 (9.4 overs)		Lee Nurse 26 (50); Melvyn Betts 4/34 (8 overs)

Durham won by 43 runs
Memorial Ground, Finchampstead
Umpires: Alan Bundy & Ken Palmer
Player of the match: John Emburey (Berkshire)

21 June 2000
(scorecard)

Cumberland; 140 all out (48.1 overs)	v	Kent; 141/4 (39 overs)
Martin Lewis 65 (84); Kristian Adams 6/24 (9.1 overs)		Rahul Dravid 54 (96); Marcus Sharp 2/23 (10 overs)

Kent won by 6 wickets
Edenside, Carlisle
Umpires: John Holder & Neil Mallender
Player of the match: Kristian Adams (Kent)

21 June 2000
(scorecard)

Derbyshire; 356/2 (50 overs)	v	Derbyshire Cricket Board; 133/9 (50 overs)
Michael Di Venuto 173*; Alan Gofton 2/76 (10 overs)		Ian Darlington 58; Kevin Dean 3/14 (10 overs)

Derbyshire won by 223 runs
County Ground, Derby
Umpires: Graham Burgess & Roy Palmer
Player of the match: Michael Di Venuto (Derbyshire)

21 June 2000
(scorecard)

Devon; 194/6 (50 overs)	v	Surrey; 198/2 (44 overs)
David Lye 56 (74); Martin Bicknell 3/19 (10 overs)		Alec Stewart 70 (102); Ryan Horrell 1/33 (9 overs)

Surrey won by 8 wickets
The Maer Ground, Exmouth
Umpires: David Burden & Mervyn Kitchen
Player of the match: David Lye (Devon)

21 June 2000
(scorecard)

Glamorgan; 333/4 (50 overs)	v	Dorset; 194 all out (48.5 overs)
Matthew Elliott 156; Vyvian Pike 2/82 (10 overs)		Martin Miller 81; Darren Thomas 4/27 (8 overs)

Glamorgan won by 139 runs
Dean Park Cricket Ground, Bournemouth
Umpires: Paul Adams & Trevor Jesty
Player of the match: Matthew Elliott (Glamorgan)

21 June 2000
(scorecard)

Durham Cricket Board; 167 all out (49.5 overs)	v	Northamptonshire; 169/2 (32.2 overs)
Quentin Hughes 37 (57); Jason Brown 3/35 (10 overs)		Matthew Hayden 77 (94); Benjamin Usher 1/14 (2.2 overs)

Northamptonshire won by 8 wickets
Riverside Ground, Chester-le-Street
Umpires: Barrie Leadbeater & Bob White
Player of the match: Matthew Hayden (Northamptonshire)

21 June 2000
(scorecard)

Warwickshire; 214/8 (50 overs)	v	Essex Cricket Board; 203/8 (50 overs)
Trevor Penney 45 (52); Simon Moore 2/25 (10 overs)		Nicholas Carlier 56; Ashley Giles 2/34 (10 overs)

Warwickshire won by 11 runs
Toby Howe Cricket Ground, Billericay
Umpires: Christopher Kelly & Jeremy Lloyds
Player of the match: Trevor Penney (Warwickshire)

21 June 2000
(scorecard)

Kent Cricket Board; 149 all out (50 overs)	v	Hampshire; 150/2 (36.5 overs)
Simon Williams 45 (54); Shane Warne 4/34 (10 overs)		Dimitri Mascarenhas 67 (67); Kevin Masters 1/28 (8 overs)

Hampshire won by 8 wickets
St Lawrence Ground, Canterbury
Umpires: Charlie Puckett & George Sharp
Player of the match: Dimitri Mascarenhas (Hampshire)

21 June 2000
(scorecard)

Lincolnshire; 190/9 (50 overs)	v	Lancashire; 193/0 (30 overs)
Richard Howitt 52 (88); Sourav Ganguly 3/26 (10 overs)		Sourav Ganguly 120* (100)

Lancashire won by 10 wickets
Sports Ground, Cleethorpes
Umpires: Jeff Evans & Alan Whitehead
Player of the match: Sourav Ganguly (Lancashire)

21 June 2000
(scorecard)

Middlesex; 274/5 (50 overs)	v	Nottinghamshire; 146 all out (37 overs)
Justin Langer 100 (129); Paul Franks 2/47 (10 overs)		Usman Afzaal 31 (53); Aaron Laraman 4/39 (9 overs)

Middlesex won by 128 runs
Lord's, London
Umpires: Tony Clarkson & Nigel Cowley
Player of the match: Justin Langer (Middlesex)

21 June 2000
(scorecard)

Middlesex Cricket Board; 153 all out (50 overs)	v	Sussex; 154/1 (27.1 overs)
Alastair Fraser 32; Billy Taylor 4/26 (10 overs)		Richard Montgomerie 68*; Robin Jones 1/14 (2 overs)

Sussex won by 9 wickets
John Walker's Ground, Southgate
Umpires: Keith Coburn & John Harris
Player of the match: Billy Taylor (Sussex)

21 June 2000
(scorecard)

Leicestershire; 328/9 (50 overs)	v	Northumberland; 102 all out (33.3 overs)
Darren Stevens 133; Stephen Foster 6/52 (10 overs)		Wayne Falla 23; Anil Kumble 5/27 (9.3 overs)

Leicestershire won by 226 runs
Osborne Avenue, Jesmond
Umpires: John Hampshire & Pasty Harris
Player of the match: Darren Stevens (Leicestershire)

21 June 2000
(scorecard)

Somerset; 262/6 (50 overs)	v	Shropshire; 235/9 (50 overs)
Marcus Trescothick 87 (97); Gavin Byram 2/40 (9 overs)		James Ralph 102* (81); Marcus Trescothick 2/23 (7 overs)

Somerset won by 27 runs
St George's Cricket Ground, Telford
Umpires: David Constant & Bill Smith
Player of the match: James Ralph (Shropshire)

21 June 2000
(scorecard)

Essex; 154 all out (48.1 overs)	v	Wales Minor Counties; 51 all out (21 overs)
Stephen Peters 58 (110); David Towse 3/19 (10 overs)		Michael Newbold 16 (20); Ronnie Irani 3/15 (6 overs)

Essex won by 103 runs
St. Helen's, Swansea
Umpires: Vanburn Holder & Michael Moran
Player of the match: Stephen Peters (Essex)

21 June 2000
(scorecard)

Gloucestershire; 211/8 (50 overs)	v	Worcestershire; 212/7 (48.5 overs)
Jack Russell 84 (102); Richard Illingworth 3/43 (10 overs)		Ryan Driver 61 (93); Martyn Ball 2/31 (9 overs)

Worcestershire won by 3 wickets
New Road, Worcester
Umpires: John Steele & Peter Willey
Player of the match: Ryan Driver (Worcestershire)

- The match was replayed on 4 July, after it was discovered Worcestershire had fielded an ineligible player, Kabir Ali, who had appeared for another team earlier in the tournament.

21 June 2000
(scorecard)

Yorkshire; 240/5 (50 overs)	v	Yorkshire Cricket Board; 110 all out (38.5 overs)
Michael Vaughan 70 (113); Anthony McKenna 1/25 (4 overs)		Richard Kettleborough 31 (59); Darren Gough 5/30 (8.5 overs)

Yorkshire won by 130 runs
St George's Road, Harrogate
Umpires: Allan Jones & Ken Shuttleworth
Player of the match: Michael Vaughan (Yorkshire)

4 July 2000
(scorecard)

Gloucestershire; 163 all out (49.3 overs)	v	Worcestershire; 158 all out (49.3 overs)
Ian Harvey 32 (29); Glenn McGrath 4/23 (10 overs)		Paul Pollard 55 (117); James Averis 4/36 (10 overs)

Gloucestershire won by 5 runs
New Road, Worcester
Umpires: Ray Julian & George Sharp
Player of the match: Martyn Ball (Gloucestershire)

- Match was a replay of the original match played on 21 June 2000.

=== Fourth round ===
5 July 2000
(scorecard)

Durham; 91 all out (42.4 overs)	v	Hampshire; 92/5 (24.3 overs)
Nick Speak 15 (80); Shane Warne 2/12 (7 overs)		Robin Smith 23* (32); Melvyn Betts 2/26 (10 overs)

Hampshire won by 5 wickets
Riverside Ground, Chester-le-Street
Umpires: Barry Dudleston & Roy Palmer
Player of the match: John Stephenson (Hampshire)

5, 6 July 2000
(scorecard)

Kent; 121 all out (48.4 overs)	v	Glamorgan; 122/5 (37.1 overs)
Paul Nixon 38 (80); Alex Wharf 3/18 (10 overs)		Keith Newell 62 (103); Mark Ealham 4/36 (10 overs)

Glamorgan won by 5 wickets
St Lawrence Ground, Canterbury
Umpires: Ray Julian & David Shepherd
Player of the match: Keith Newell (Glamorgan)

- Match was scheduled for one day but extended to two.

5 July 2000
(scorecard)

Lancashire; 251/5 (50 overs)	v	Essex; 183 all out (42.3 overs)
Sourav Ganguly 97 (119); Paul Grayson 1/34 (7 overs)		Danny Law 45 (44); Chris Schofield 4/34 (7 overs)

Lancashire won by 68 runs
Old Trafford, Manchester
Umpires: David Constant & Trevor Jesty
Player of the match: Sourav Ganguly (Lancashire)

5 July 2000
(scorecard)

Gloucestershire; 210/8 (50 overs)	v	Leicestershire; 200 all out (48.1 overs)
Kim Barnett 86 (141); James Ormond 2/52 (10 overs)		Darren Maddy 72 (83); Ian Harvey 4/40 (9 overs)

Gloucestershire won by 10 runs
Grace Road, Leicester
Umpires: Barrie Leadbeater & Neil Mallender
Player of the match: Kim Barnett (Gloucestershire)

5, 6 July 2000
(scorecard)

Middlesex; 223/4 (50 overs)	v	Somerset; 58 all out (28.3 overs)
Paul Weekes 71* (83); Paul Jarvis 2/43 (9 overs)		Keith Parsons 24 (61); Timothy Bloomfield 4/17 (8 overs)

Middlesex won by 165 runs
John Walker's Ground, Southgate
Umpires: Mervyn Kitchen & Ken Palmer
Player of the match: Timothy Bloomfield (Middlesex)

- Match was scheduled for one day but extended to two.

5 July 2000
(scorecard)

Northamptonshire; 252 all out (50 overs)	v	Yorkshire; 183 all out (43.5 overs)
David Sales 65 (94); Darren Gough 4/36 (10 overs)		Anthony McGrath 64 (69); Michael Strong 3/10 (7 overs)

Northamptonshire won by 69 runs
County Ground, Northampton
Umpires: Mark Benson & Tony Clarkson
Player of the match: Michael Strong (Northamptonshire)

5, 6 July 2000
(scorecard)

Sussex; 192/9 (50 overs)	v	Surrey; 196/3 (47.4 overs)
Michael Bevan 60 (94); Adam Hollioake 3/23 (6 overs)		Mark Butcher 87 (146); Robin Martin-Jenkins 2/28 (10 overs)

Surrey won by 7 wickets
The Oval, London
Umpires: Graham Burgess & Pasty Harris
Player of the match: Mark Butcher (Surrey)

- Match was scheduled for one day but extended to two.

5 July 2000
(scorecard)

Warwickshire; 257/8 (50 overs)	v	Derbyshire; 217 all out (46.5 overs)
Ashley Giles 107 (97); Dominic Cork 2/40 (10 overs)		Michael Di Venuto 84 (98); Allan Donald 4/42 (8.5 overs)

Warwickshire won by 40 runs
Edgbaston, Birmingham
Umpires: Nigel Cowley & John Holder
Player of the match: Ashley Giles (Warwickshire)

=== Quarter-finals ===
25 July 2000
(scorecard)

Middlesex; 127 all out (44 overs)	v	Hampshire; 128/3 (34.5 overs)
Keith Dutch 26 (64); Dimitri Mascarenhas 4/25 (10 overs)		John Stephenson 35 (79); Keith Dutch 2/37 (8 overs)

Hampshire won by 7 wickets
Lord's, London
Umpires: Vanburn Holder & Bob White
Player of the match: Dimitri Mascarenhas (Hampshire)

25 July 2000
(scorecard)

Warwickshire; 273/7 (50 overs)	v	Glamorgan; 192 all out (44.4 overs)
Nick Knight 118 (143); Alex Wharf 2/44 (10 overs)		Matthew Maynard 36 (40); Allan Donald 3/29 (8.4 overs)

Warwickshire won by 81 runs
Edgbaston, Birmingham
Umpires: Mervyn Kitchen & John Steele
Player of the match: Nick Knight (Warwickshire)

26 July 2000
(scorecard)

Gloucestershire; 280/8 (50 overs)	v	Northamptonshire; 218/9 (50 overs)
Tim Hancock 110 (131); Darren Cousins 3/42 (10 overs)		Tony Penberthy 54 (71); Ian Harvey 4/37 (10 overs)

Gloucestershire won by 62 runs
The Royal & Sun Alliance County Ground, Bristol
Umpires: Allan Jones & Peter Willey
Player of the match: Tim Hancock (Gloucestershire)

26 July 2000
(scorecard)

Surrey; 210/7 (50 overs)	v	Lancashire; 214/2 (36 overs)
Graham Thorpe 55 (67); Chris Schofield 4/41 (10 overs)		Andrew Flintoff 135* (111); Alex Tudor 2/48 (10 overs)

Lancashire won by 8 wickets
The Oval, London
Umpires: George Sharp & David Shepherd
Player of the match: Andrew Flintoff (Lancashire)

=== Semi-finals ===
12 August 2000
(scorecard)

Warwickshire; 262/4 (50 overs)	v	Hampshire; 243/7 (50 overs)
Nick Knight 100 (129); Alan Mullally 2/55 (10 overs)		Robin Smith 61 (68); Dougie Brown 2/37 (10 overs)

Warwickshire won by 19 runs
Edgbaston, Birmingham
Umpires: Barry Dudleston & Jeremy Lloyds
Player of the match: Nick Knight (Warwickshire)

13, 14 August 2000
(scorecard)

Gloucestershire; 248/7 (50 overs)	v	Lancashire; 150 all out (45.2 overs)
Kim Barnett 80 (128); Peter Martin 3/44 (10 overs)		John Crawley 41 (56); Mike Smith 2/18 (10 overs)

Gloucestershire won by 98 runs
The Royal & Sun Alliance County Ground, Bristol
Umpires: Trevor Jesty & Alan Whitehead
Player of the match: Mark Alleyne (Gloucestershire)

- Match was scheduled for one day but extended to two.

=== Final ===
26, 27 August 2000
(scorecard)

Warwickshire; 205/7 (50 overs)	v	Gloucestershire; 122/3 (29.4 overs)
Ashley Giles 60 (104); Mike Smith 3/18 (10 overs)		Ian Harvey 47 (60); Allan Donald 2/7 (6 overs)

Gloucestershire won by 22 runs (D/L method)
Lord's, London
Umpires: John Hampshire & Ray Julian
Player of the match: Allan Donald (Warwickshire)

- Match was scheduled for one day but extended to two. When play was halted Gloucestershire needed to have scored 101 runs to win.
- This was the first domestic English one-day final to be concluded by the use of the Duckworth–Lewis method
