= List of Hampshire Cricket Board List A players =

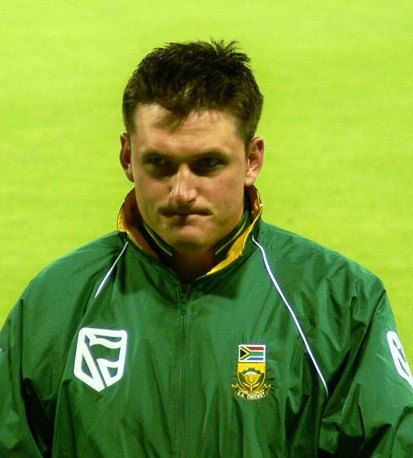
Graeme Smith played one match for the Hampshire Cricket Board in 2000, scoring 4 runs

The Hampshire Cricket Board was formed in 1996, and competed in the MCCA Knockout Trophy between 1998 and 2002. They have appeared in eight List A matches, making four NatWest Trophy and four Cheltenham & Gloucester Trophy appearances. The players in this list have all played at least one List A match. Hampshire Cricket Board cricketers who have not represented the Board in List A cricket are excluded from the list.

Players are listed in order of appearance, where players made their debut in the same match, they are ordered by batting order. Players in bold have played first-class cricket.

== Key ==
**General**

- ♠ – Captain
- † – Wicket-keeper
- **First** – Year of debut for Hampshire Cricket Board
- **Last** – Year of latest match played for Hampshire Cricket Board
- **Mat** – Number of matches played for Hampshire Cricket Board
- **Win%** – Winning percentage

**Batting**

- **Inn** – Number of innings batted
- **NO** – Number of innings not out
- **Runs** – Runs scored in career
- **HS** – Highest score
- **100** – Centuries scored
- **50** – Half-centuries scored
- **Avg** – Runs scored per dismissal
- * – Batsman remained not out

**Bowling**

- **Balls** – Balls bowled in career
- **Wkt** – Wickets taken in career
- **BBI** – Best bowling in an innings
- **BBM** – Best bowling in a match
- **Ave** – Average runs per wicket

**Fielding**

- **Ca** – Catches taken
- **St** – Stumpings effected

== List of players ==
No.	Name	Nationality	First	Last	Mat	Batting			Bowling				Fielding	
No.	Name	Nationality	First	Last	Mat	Runs	HS	Avg	Balls	Wkt	BBI	Ave	Ca	St
1	Luke Sears	England	1999	1999	3	46	23	15.33	78	0	–	–	1	0
2	Matthew Compton	England	1999	2000	4	205	105*	68.33	0	0	–	–	1	0
3	**Chris Nevin**	New Zealand	1999	1999	3	147	88	49.00	18	0	–	–	0	0
4	**Lawrence Prittipaul**	England	1999	1999	3	66	30	22.00	156	4	2/53	31.25	3	0
5	Matthew Scott	England	1999	1999	3	56	30*	28.00	0	0	–	–	1	0
6	**Rajesh Maru** ♠	England	1999	2001	5	21	11*	10.50	240	4	2/53	37.50	2	0
7	David Banks †	England	1999	2002	5	16	7	5.33	0	0	–	–	6	1
8	Roger Miller	England	1999	2002	8	128	34	21.33	396	8	3/26	36.36	2	0
9	**Charles van der Gucht**	England	1999	1999	3	4	3	2.00	144	5	3/35	19.00	0	0
10	Kirk Stewart	England	1999	1999	3	2	2	1.00	156	7	3/52	18.71	0	0
11	Andrew Perry	England	1999	2002	6	41	6	8.20	16	0	–	–	1	0
12	**Damian Shirazi**	England	2000	2002	4	117	101	39.00	0	0	–	–	0	0
13	**Graeme Smith**	South Africa	2000	2000	1	4	4	4.00	0	0	–	–	0	0
14	Ross Hunter †	England	2000	2000	1	33	33	33.00	0	0	–	–	0	1
15	Christopher Yates	England	2000	2001	2	23	23	11.50	90	4	3/17	9.75	0	0
16	**Chris Tremlett**	England	2000	2000	1	10	10	10.00	48	2	2/35	17.50	0	0
17	**Ian Hilsum**	England	2000	2000	1	13	13*	–	24	0	–	–	0	0
18	**James Tomlinson**	England	2000	2000	1	4	4	4.00	60	0	–	–	0	0
19	Paul Marks	England	2001	2001	2	22	17*	22.00	0	0	–	–	0	0
20	**Chris Benham**	England	2001	2001	1	0	0	0.00	–	0	–	–	0	0
21	**Richard Hindley**	England	2001	2002	4	50	38	25.00	124	3	2/27	30.66	2	0
22	Richard Kenway	England	2001	2001	2	47	47	47.00	0	0	–	–	0	0
23	Christopher Knight	England	2001	2001	1	11	11*	–	48	0	–	–	0	0
24	Ben Nolan	England	2001	2001	1	0	0	–	0	0	–	–	0	0
25	James Hibberd	England	2001	2001	1	0	0	–	0	0	–	–	0	0
26	Paul Gover ♠	England	2001	2002	3	44	34	14.66	0	0	–	–	2	0
27	**Steve Snell** †	England	2001	2001	1	3	3	3.00	0	0	–	–	1	0
28	David Greetham	England	2001	2002	3	8	6*	4.00	120	2	2/52	52.00	3	0
29	**Richard Dibden**	England	2001	2001	3	18	13	9.00	162	4	2/40	32.00	2	0
30	**Luke Ronchi**	Australia	2002	2002	1	78	78	78.00	0	0	–	–	0	0
31	**Daniel Peacock**	Zimbabwe	2002	2002	1	8	8	8.00	24	1	1/19	19.00	1	0
32	**Mackie Hobson**	South Africa	2002	2002	2	6	6*	–	102	5	3/54	20.40	0	0
33	Jonathan Norris	England	2002	2002	1	0	0	–	0	0	–	–	0	0
34	Charles Forward	England	2002	2002	1	20	20	20.00	0	0	–	–	0	0
35	**Iain Brunnschweiler** †	England	2002	2002	1	37	37	37.00	0	0	–	–	2	0
36	Daniel Goldstraw	England	2002	2002	1	0	0	0.00	60	1	1/30	30.00	0	0

== List A captains ==
No.	Name	First	Last	Mat	Won	Lost	Tied	Win%
1	Rajesh Maru	1999	2001	5	2	3	0	40%
2	Paul Gover	2001	2002	3	1	2	0	33.33%
**Total**		1999	2003	**8**	**3**	**5**	**0**	**37.05%**

== See also ==
- Hampshire Cricket Board
