= Doidge =

Doidge is an English surname.

== Notable people ==
Notable people with this surname include:

- Christian Doidge, Welsh footballer
- Ethel Doidge, South African mycologist
- Frederick Doidge, New Zealand journalist and politician
- Geoff Doidge, South African politician
- Jack Doidge, Anglican priest in Canada
- Matthew Doidge, English cricketer
- Merryn Doidge, English rugby union player
- Norman Doidge, Canadian psychiatrist
