= Goldstraw =

Goldstraw is a surname. Notable people with the surname include:

- Cliff Goldstraw (1916–1994), Australian rules footballer
- Daniel Goldstraw (born 1969), English cricketer
