= Grasmere Road Ground =

Cricket ground in Cove, Hampshire, England

Grasmere Road
- Interactive map of Grasmere Road

Ground information
- Location: Cove, Hampshire
- Country: England
- Coordinates: 51.2934°N 0.7769°W
- Establishment: c. 1988

Team information
Hampshire Cricket Board	(1999–2000)
- As of 9 January 2009; Source: Ground profile

Grasmere Road is a cricket ground located north of Farnborough Airport on Grasmere Road, from which the ground gets its name, in Cove, Hampshire, England. The ground is bordered by housing on its west and north sides, while to the south it is bordered by an open field and on its east side by woodland. The grounds facilities include a pavilion, practice nets and a scoreboard. The ground is owned by Cove Cricket Club, which was founded in 1935.

The first recorded match held on the ground came in 1988 when Hampshire Under-16s played Berkshire Under-16s. The ground was used by Cove Cricket Club and Hampshire age-group teams throughout the 1990s. The ground hosted a single MCCA Knockout Trophy match between the Hampshire Cricket Board and the Sussex Cricket Board in 1999, while the following season a single List A match was played there in the 2000 NatWest Trophy between the Hampshire Cricket Board and Huntingdonshire, which Huntingdonshire won by 28 runs. Ross Hunter of the Hampshire Cricket Board top scored in the match with 33, while the Hampshire Cricket Board's Christopher Yates and Huntingdonshire's Billy Young both took 3 wickets each.

== See also ==
- List of cricket grounds in England and Wales
