= James Hibberd =

James Hibberd may refer to:

- James Hibberd (cricketer) (born 1981), English cricketer
- James Hibberd (writer), American journalist and screenwriter

== See also ==
- James Hibbard (born 1981), American road racing cyclist
- James Hibbert (1831–1903), English architect
