= Luke Sears =

English cricketer (born 1980)

Personal information
- Full name: Luke Alexander Sears
- Born: 3 April 1980 (age 46); Portsmouth, Hampshire, England
- Height: 6 ft 0 in (1.83 m)
- Batting: Right-handed
- Bowling: Right-arm medium

Domestic team information
- Years: Team
- 1999: Hampshire Cricket Board

Career statistics
Competition	List A
Matches	3
Runs scored	46
Batting average	15.33
100s/50s	0/0
Top score	23
Balls bowled	78
Wickets	0
Bowling average	–
5 wickets in innings	–
10 wickets in match	–
Best bowling	–
Catches/stumpings	1/–
- Source: Cricinfo, 28 December 2009

Luke Alexander Sears (born 3 April 1980) is a former English cricketer. Sears is a right-handed batsman who bowled right-arm medium pace. He was born at Portsmouth in 1980.

Sears represented Hampshire County Cricket Club through the ages 11 to 19, of which the final (under 17 – 19 year) he captained the county to national successes.

Sears made his List-A debut for the Hampshire Cricket Board in the 1999 NatWest Trophy against Suffolk. During the tournament he played a further two matches against Shropshire and Glamorgan.

Sears also represented the Hampshire Second XI in six matches between 1998 and 1999.

Since 2001, Sears has been competing at a national level in angling and is an owner of Hallcroft Coarse Fishery.

== See also ==
- List of Hampshire Cricket Board List A players
