= Iain Brunnschweiler =

English footballer and cricketer (born 1979)

Personal information
- Full name: Iain Brunnschweiler
- Born: 10 December 1979 (age 46); Southampton, Hampshire, England
- Nickname: Braunchy
- Batting: Right-handed
- Role: Wicket-keeper

Domestic team information
- Years: Team
- 2000–2003: Hampshire (squad no. 18)
- 2002: Hampshire Cricket Board

Career statistics
Competition	First-class	List A
Matches	6	4
Runs scored	91	37
Batting average	13.00	18.50
100s/50s	–/–	–/–
Top score	34	37
Catches/stumpings	20/–	6/–
Source: Iain Brunnschweiler at Cricinfo
22 January 2010
Association football career
- Positions: Centre-back; goalkeeper
Youth career
- Southampton
Senior career*
Years	Team	Apps	(Gls)
2005–2007	A.F.C. Totton	?	(0)
?	Brockenhurst	?	(0)
- * Club domestic league appearances and goals

Iain Brunnschweiler (born 10 December 1979) is an English former professional cricketer, and semi-professional footballer. He played first-class cricket as a wicket-keeper for Hampshire between 2000 and 2003, and later coached cricket for both Hampshire and England, the latter at youth levels. He also played association football for A.F.C. Totton between 2005 and 2007, and later coached at Southampton until 2023.

== Sporting career ==
=== Cricket ===
Of Swiss ancestry, Brunnschweiler was born at Southampton in December 1979. He was educated at King Edward VI School in Southampton. He signed a contract with Hampshire as reserve wicket-keeper to Adrian Aymes, following the departure of Mark Garaway in 1999. He mde his debut for Hampshire in a first-class match at Portsmouth against the touring New Zealand A cricket team in 2000. The following season, he made a first-class appearance against the touring Australians at the Rose Bowl, with Brunnschweiler hitting the winning runs for Hampshire in their historic two wicket victory. The following season, he made his debut in List A one-day cricket when he played against Middlesex in the Norwich Union League, with him appearing in the same competition against Sussex. He also played a one-day match for the Hampshire Cricket Board against Staffordshire at Hursley Park in the 2nd round of the 2003 Cheltenham & Gloucester Trophy, which was played in September 2002. Brunnschweiler made his County Championship debut against Yorkshire at Scarborough in 2003, following an injury to regular wicket-keeper Nic Pothas. He appeared in a further two first-class matches in the 2003 County Championship. In the same season he played a single one-day match for Hampshire against the touring Zimbabweans. Brunnschweiler was released by Hampshire at the end of the season alongside John Francis and Alex Morris. In six first-class matches for Hampshire, he scored 91 runs at an average of exactly 13, with a highest score of 34.

Brunnschweiler was the assistant and fitness coach at Hampshire until November 2011, when he left to take up a development role with England. As part of his role he was appointed head coach of the England Under-16s and 17s along with coaching the England Under-19s. He has authored two published books on the subject of coaching cricket. In club cricket, he played for several teams in the Southern Premier League.

=== Football ===
During his youth, Brunnschweiler played under Micky Adams and Stewart Henderson for various Southampton youth teams as a centre-back and goalkeeper, before deciding to pursue a professional cricket career with Hampshire. He later played for AFC Totton as a goalkeeper, with whom he reached the FA Vase final in 2007, losing 3–1 to Truro City at the new Wembley Stadium in front of a crowd of 36,232. Brunnschweiler later returned to Southampton as coach development officer in 2019, having spent the year prior to his appointment working as the strategic lead for talent and performance coaching at UK Coaching. In February 2022, he was appointed to head Southampton's new technical department based at Southampton's Staplewood Campus. Following an overhaul of their backroom staff, he left Southampton in June 2023.

== Selected works ==
- Brunnschweiler, Iain (2009). The Inspired Cricket: Practice Like the Pros. Romsey: Inspired Sports Publishing. ISBN 9780956555106.
- Brunnschweiler, Iain (2013). Inspired Cricket: Practice with Purpose. Romsey: Inspired Sports Publishing. ISBN 9780956555113.
