= Billy Young (cricketer) =

English cricketer

Personal information
- Full name: William Young
- Born: 14 December 1970 (age 55); Peterborough, Cambridgeshire, England
- Batting: Left-handed
- Bowling: Left-arm medium-fast

Domestic team information
- Years: Team
- 2000: Huntingdonshire

Career statistics
Competition	List A
Matches	2
Runs scored	16
Batting average	16.00
100s/50s	0/0
Top score	15
Balls bowled	102
Wickets	3
Bowling average	20.66
5 wickets in innings	0
10 wickets in match	0
Best bowling	3/22
Catches/stumpings	1/–
- Source: Cricinfo, 2 June 2010

William Young (born 14 December 1970) is a former English cricketer. Young was a left-handed batsman who bowled left-arm medium-fast. He was born at Peterborough, Cambridgeshire.

Young made his List A debut for Huntingdonshire in the 2000 NatWest Trophy against the Hampshire Cricket Board at Grasmere Road, Cove, where he took his 3 List-A wickets, including the wicket of future South African captain Graeme Smith. For his performance in the match he was named man of the match. His second and final List-A match come in the same competition against a Yorkshire Cricket Board side.
