= Michael Strong (disambiguation) =

Michael Strong (1918–1980) was an American actor.

Michael Strong may also refer to:

- Michael Strong (cricketer) (born 1974), English cricketer
- Michael Strong, a judge of the County Court of Victoria
- Michael P. Strong, fictional character in Murder at the ABA by Isaac Asimov
