= Matthew Scott (cricketer) =

English cricketer (born 1979)

Personal information
- Full name: Matthew Alexander Scott
- Born: 15 September 1979 (age 47); Portsmouth, Hampshire, England
- Batting: Right-handed
- Bowling: Right-arm medium

Domestic team information
- Years: Team
- 1999: Hampshire Cricket Board

Career statistics
Competition	List A
Matches	3
Runs scored	56
Batting average	28.00
100s/50s	0/0
Top score	30*
Catches/stumpings	1/–
- Source: Cricinfo, 28 December 2009

Matthew Alexander Scott (born 15 September 1979) is a former English cricketer. Scott was a right-handed batsman who bowled right-arm medium. He was born at Portsmouth in 1979.

Scott was educated at St John's College in Southsea, Portsmouth and played his cricket alongside his education there, whilst playing at Waterloovile Cricket Club, before quickly breaking into the Hampshire Colts set up as an all-rounder, playing for Hampshire Under 11s. He continued through the colts sides, being an ever present all the way through the age groups up to Under 19s and into the Hampshire 2nd XI. Scott was drawn into the acclaimed annual Jersey Under 16s Cricket Festival as a fifteen year old and opened the batting and the bowling, where he and the team had great success. He returned the next year with the team having similar success.

Scott made his List-A debut for the Hampshire Cricket Board in the 1999 NatWest Trophy against Suffolk when he hit 30 not out, hitting the winning straight six to seal victory. He had earlier taken a diving catch at extra cover from the bowling of experienced Hampshire left arm off spinner and team Captain Rajesh Maru. Scott played a further two matches in the competition against Shropshire when he scored 28, stumped around his legs. Scott instigated an historical finish when Shropshire looked deemed to cruise to victory by creating a run out, once again off the bowling of Rajesh Maru at short mid off, back to wicket keeper David Banks. A throw from Andrew Perry at long-on in to bowler Roger Miller letting him take the bails off for victory on the last delivery, by 1 run. Shropshire being defeated after losing their last few wickets needing fewer than 10 runs for victory. Glamorgan. The 3rd match against Glamorgan was less victorious for Scott. Run out for just 1 run. Batting with New Zealander Chris Nevin he was run out off the bowling of England off spinner Robert Croft and the fielding at mid wicket of fellow Welshman and England player Matthew Maynard. In his List-A career Scott scored 56 runs at an average of 28.00, with a high score of 30* against Suffolk.

== See also ==
- List of Hampshire Cricket Board List A players
