= Robin Jones =

Robin Jones may refer to:

- Robin Jones (basketball) (1954–2018), American basketball player
- Robin Jones (musician) (born 1973), Scottish drummer
- Robin Jones (cricketer) (born 1973), English cricketer
- Robin Jones (figure skater) (1943–1986), British figure skater

== See also ==
- Robin Jones Gunn, American Christian novelist
- Robin Griffith-Jones (born 1956), English Anglican priest
- Robin Lloyd-Jones (1934–2024), British author
- Robin Wright-Jones (born 1950), American politician
