= Nadim Abbas (cricketer) =

Dutch cricketer

Personal information
- Full name: S. Nadim Abbas
- Born: 1 January 1968 (age 58); Netherlands
- Batting: Right-handed
- Bowling: Right-arm fast-medium

Domestic team information
- Years: Team
- 2001–2002: Netherlands

Career statistics
Competition	List A
Matches	2
Runs scored	15
Batting average	15.00
100s/50s	–/–
Top score	12*
Balls bowled	60
Wickets	0
Bowling average	–
5 wickets in innings	–
10 wickets in match	–
Best bowling	–
Catches/stumpings	–/–
- Source: Cricinfo, 8 February 2022

S. Nadim Abbas (born 1 January 1968) is a Dutch former cricketer.

Abbas was born in the Netherlands on New Year's Day in 1968. A club cricketer for Voorburg Cricket Club, he made his debut in List A one-day cricket for the Netherlands against Norfolk in England at Horsford in the 1st round of the 2002 Cheltenham & Gloucester Trophy (played in August 2001), an English domestic one-day tournament the Netherlands were invited to take part in. Against their minor counties opponents, the Dutch reached the Norfolk score of 245 with nine wickets down, with Abbas being run out off the final ball of the match by the combination of Stephen Livermore and Chris Rogers, resulting in a tie. He made a second List A appearance in the 2nd round of the 2003 Cheltenham & Gloucester Trophy (played in September 2002) against Bedfordshire, again played in England at Luton. In his two List A, he scored 15 runs with a highest score of 12 not out, in addition to bowling ten wicketless overs with his right-arm fast-medium bowling.
