= Richard Hindley =

English cricketer

Personal information
- Full name: Richard James Edward Hindley
- Born: 25 April 1975 (age 51); Portsmouth, Hampshire, England
- Batting: Left-handed
- Bowling: Right-arm off-break

Domestic team information
- Years: Team
- 2001–2002: Hampshire Cricket Board
- 2003: Hampshire

Career statistics
Competition	First-class	List A
Matches	1	4
Runs scored	76	50
Batting average	76.00	25.00
100s/50s	–/1	–/–
Top score	68*	38
Balls bowled	54	124
Wickets	–	3
Bowling average	–	30.66
5 wickets in innings	–	–
10 wickets in match	–	–
Best bowling	–	2/27
Catches/stumpings	–/–	2/–
- Source: Cricinfo, 7 December 2009

Richard James Edward Hindley (born 25 April 1975) is an English former first-class cricketer.

The son of Bill Hindley, who was chairman of the South East Hants Cricket Association for 45 years, he was born at Portsmouth in April 1975 and played club cricket for Havant Cricket Club. Hindley played List A one-day cricket for the Hampshire Cricket Board (HCB) on four occasions, making his debut against the Kent Cricket Board at Maidstone in the 1st round of the 2001 Cheltenham & Gloucester Trophy. The following year, he played in the 2nd round of the 2002 Cheltenham & Gloucester Trophy against Ireland. His final two one-day appearances came against Wiltshire and Staffordshire in the 1st and 2nd rounds of the 2003 Cheltenham & Gloucester Trophy (played late in the 2002 season) at Hursley Park. In his four one-day matches for the HCB, he scored 50 runs with a highest score of 38, whilst with his off break bowling, he took 3 wickets with best figures of 2 for 27.

By July 2003, Hindley was unemployed. Following an injury to Shaun Udal prior to Hampshire's County Championship match against Glamorgan at the Rose Bowl, Hindley received a phone call from Hampshire whilst decorating his mother's house, asking him to play in this match. Thus, he made what would be his only appearance in first-class cricket. Hampshire began the match poorly, with Glamorgan making 437 and then bowling Hampshire out for 185, with Hindley being dismissed for 8 runs by David Harrison. Following-on in their second innings, Hampshire made 449. Hindley ended the innings not out on 68, having shared in a half century partnership with Dimitri Mascarenhas to help set Glamorgan a victory target of 198 for victory. Glamorgan failed to chase this down, with Hampshire winning by 93 runs. During the match, his hand was broken by a Michael Kasprowicz delivery, ruling him out for a month; however, he would not feature for Hampshire again in any format.

Hindley continued to play club cricket for Havant, becoming in 2018 the first person to take 500 wickets in the Southern Premier League. He has also been involved with the HCB in a non-playing capacity as their development officer, and is an ECB Level 3 coach with Serious Cricket.
