= Ross McLean =

Ross McLean may refer to:

- Ross McLean (politician) (born 1944), former Liberal member of the Australian House of Representatives
- Ross McLean (civil servant) (1905–1984), Canadian journalist and civil servant
- Ross McLean (cricketer) (born 1981), English cricketer
