= Justin Engelke =

South African cricketer (born 1976)

Personal information
- Full name: Justin Marc Engelke
- Born: 3 April 1974 (age 52); Cape Town, Cape Province, South Africa
- Batting: Right-handed
- Bowling: Right-arm medium-fast

Domestic team information
- Years: Team
- 2000: Hertfordshire
- 1997/98–1999/00: Gauteng
- 1996/97: Transvaal B

Career statistics
Competition	First-class	List A
Matches	5	18
Runs scored	30	6
Batting average	15.00	6.00
100s/50s	–/–	–/–
Top score	11*	6*
Balls bowled	609	774
Wickets	9	22
Bowling average	35.55	23.45
5 wickets in innings	–	–
10 wickets in match	–	–
Best bowling	2/30	4/12
Catches/stumpings	2/–	3/–
- Source: Cricinfo, 1 October 2011

Justin Marc Engelke (born 3 April 1976) is a former South African cricketer. Engelke was a right-handed batsman who bowled right-arm medium-fast. He was born in Cape Town, Cape Province and educated at Park Town Boys School and Rand Afrikaans University.

Engelke made his first-class debut for Transvaal B against Eastern Province B in the 1996/97 UCB Bowl. He made three further first-class appearances for the team in that season, taking 7 wickets at an average of 35.85, with best figures of 2/30. His List debut came for Gauteng (formerly Transvaal) against Easterns in the 1997/98 Standard Bank League. He made sixteen further List A appearances for Gauteng, the last of which came against KwaZulu-Natal in the 1999/00 Standard Bank League. He took 19 wickets in his seventeen List A appearances for the province, which came at an average of 26.73, with best figures of 4/12. He also made a single first-class appearance for Gauteng against Griqualand West in the 1998/99 SuperSport Series. He took the wickets of Mickey Arthur and Pieter Barnard in this match, for the cost of 69 runs from 24 overs. In 2000, he played a single List A match in England for Hertfordshire in the 2000 NatWest Trophy against Cambridgeshire, taking the wickets of Simon Kellett, Nigel Gadsby and Ajaz Akhtar. His spell of 10 overs cost only 8 runs, with 8 of his 10 overs being maidens. Despite this, Hertfordshire lost the match by four wickets. Engelke didn't feature in any Minor counties fixtures for the county.
