= Vincent Winn =

English cricketer

Personal information
- Full name: Vincent Paul Winn
- Born: 26 July 1966 (age 60); Cambridge, Cambridgeshire, England
- Batting: Right-handed

Domestic team information
- Years: Team
- 1999–2000: Huntingdonshire

Career statistics
Competition	LA
Matches	3
Runs scored	97
Batting average	32.33
100s/50s	–/1
Top score	50
Balls bowled	–
Wickets	–
Bowling average	–
5 wickets in innings	–
10 wickets in match	–
Best bowling	–
Catches/stumpings	–/-
- Source: Cricinfo, 1 June 2010

Vincent Paul Winn (born 26 July 1966) is a former English cricketer. Winn was a right-handed batsman.

Winn made his List-A debut for Huntingdonshire in the 1999 NatWest Trophy against Bedfordshire. Winn played 2 further List-A matches for Huntingdonshire in the 2000 NatWest Trophy against a Hampshire Cricket Board side and a Yorkshire Cricket Board side, against whom he scored his only one-day fifty. In his 3 one-day matches, he scored 97 runs at a batting average of 32.33.
