= Martin Burton =

English cricketer

Personal information
- Full name: Martin Arthur Edward Burton
- Born: 6 July 1973 (age 53); Cambridge, Cambridgeshire, England
- Batting: Left-handed
- Bowling: Slow left-arm orthodox

Domestic team information
- Years: Team
- 1999–2002: Huntingdonshire
- 1994–1995: Cambridgeshire

Career statistics
Competition	LA
Matches	8
Runs scored	134
Batting average	16.75
100s/50s	–/-
Top score	34
Balls bowled	420
Wickets	7
Bowling average	37.00
5 wickets in innings	–
10 wickets in match	–
Best bowling	2/22
Catches/stumpings	1/-
- Source: Cricinfo, 5 June 2010

Martin Arthur Edward Burton (born 6 July 1973) is a former English cricketer. Burton was a left-handed batsman who was a slow left-arm orthodox bowler.

Burton made his Minor Counties Championship for Cambridgeshire in 1994 against Bedfordshire. The following season, he made his List-A debut for the county in the 1995 NatWest Trophy against Derbyshire. This was his only List-A appearance for the county, although he made 7 Minor Counties Championship appearances for the county from 1994 to 1995.

Burton made his List-A debut for Huntingdonshire in the 1999 NatWest Trophy against Bedfordshire at Wardown Park, Luton. Burton next represented Huntingdonshire in List-A cricket in the 2000 NatWest Trophy against a Hampshire Cricket Board side and also played against a Yorkshire Cricket Board in the 2nd round of the same competition. He played 3 further List-A matches for Huntingdonshire, against Oxfordshire in the 1st round of the 2001 Cheltenham & Gloucester Trophy and a further game against Surrey Cricket Board in the 2nd round of the same competition. His final two List-A matches for the county came against a Gloucestershire Cricket Board side in the 1st round of the 2002 Cheltenham & Gloucester Trophy, which Huntingdonshire lost and against Cheshire in the 2003 Cheltenham & Gloucester Trophy.

In his 8 List-A matches, he scored 134 at a batting average of 16.75, with a high score of 34. With the ball he took 7 wickets at a bowling average of 37.00, with best figures of 2/22.
