= Ross McLean (cricketer) =

English cricketer

Personal information
- Full name: Ross Alexander McLean
- Born: 16 March 1981 (age 45); Northampton, Northamptonshire, England
- Batting: Right-handed
- Bowling: Right-arm medium-fast
- Role: Bowler

Domestic team information
- Years: Team
- 1999–2002: Northamptonshire Cricket Board

Career statistics
Competition	List A
Matches	2
Runs scored	12
Batting average	–
100s/50s	0/0
Top score	10*
Balls bowled	90
Wickets	1
Bowling average	53.00
5 wickets in innings	0
10 wickets in match	0
Best bowling	1/21
Catches/stumpings	0/–
- Source: Cricinfo, 21 November 2010

Ross Alexander McLean (born 16 March 1981) is an English cricketer. McLean is a right-handed batsman who bowls right-arm medium-fast. He was born at Northampton, Northamptonshire, and was educated at Duston Upper School before later attending the University of Leeds.

== Career ==
McLean made his debut for the Northamptonshire Cricket Board (NCB) against the Essex Cricket Board in the 1999 MCCA Knockout Trophy. He made three further appearances in that competition in 2000, as well as making his List A debut for the NCB against Northumberland in the 2000 NatWest Trophy at the County Ground, Northampton. In a match which Northumberland won by 6 wickets, McLean ended the NCB's innings of 173/8 not out on 10. Bowling ten overs in Northumberland's innings, McLean took the wicket of Wayne Falla to finish with figures of 1/21. Two years later he made a fifth and final MCCA Knockout Trophy appearance for the NCB against Devon, as well as making a second and final List A appearance in the Cheltenham & Gloucester Trophy against the Yorkshire Cricket Board at the County Ground. In a match which the Yorkshire Cricket Board won by 57 runs, McLean bowled five wicketless overs which conceded 32 runs, while he ended the NCB's innings of 176 all out not out on 2. While attending the University of Leeds, McLean played for Leeds/Bradford UCCE before it gained first-class status.
