= Andrew Sexton =

English cricketer

Personal information
- Full name: Andrew John Sexton
- Born: 23 July 1979 (age 47); Southampton, Hampshire, England
- Batting: Left-handed
- Bowling: Right-arm off break

Domestic team information
- Years: Team
- 1997-1999: Dorset
- 2000: Hampshire

Career statistics
Competition	First-class	List A
Matches	4	2
Runs scored	71	35
Batting average	10.14	17.50
100s/50s	–/–	–/–
Top score	36	34
Catches/stumpings	3/–	1/–
- Source: Cricinfo, 21 August 2023

Andrew John Sexton (born 23 July 1979) is an English former cricketer.

Sexton was born at Southampton in July 1979. He initially played club cricket for Wimborne Cricket Club, and made his debut in county cricket for Dorset against Wiltshire at Bournemouth in the 1997 Minor Counties Championship. He played minor counties cricket for Dorset until 1999, making seven appearances in the Minor Counties Championship and three in the MCCA Knockout Trophy. Sexton was a member of the Dorset team for the final of the 1999 Minor Counties Championship against Cumberland. He scored 196 in Dorset's second innings, though despite this, Dorset still lost the match by six wickets. He made two appearances in List A one-day cricket for Dorset, against Norfolk and Glamorgan in the 2000 NatWest Trophy.

Whilst playing for Dorset, Sexton was concurrently part of the Marylebone Cricket Club Young Cricketers scheme and became associated with Hampshire in 1998. He signed a contract with Hampshire at the beginning of June 2000, and two weeks later he made his debut in first-class cricket opening the batting alongside Giles White in a County Championship match against Durham at Basingstoke. He made three further first-class appearances for Hampshire in 2000, scoring 71 runs across his four matches, at an average of 10.14 and with a highest score of 36. Although he was retained for the 2001 season, he did not feature against for the Hampshire first eleven. He was subsequently released at the end of the 2001 season. He played his club cricket latterly for Bashley (Rydal) in the Southern Premier League.
