= Nathan Round =

English cricketer (born 1980)

Personal information
- Full name: Nathan William Round
- Born: 21 August 1980 (age 46); Stourbridge, Worcestershire, England
- Batting: Right-handed
- Bowling: Right-arm medium

Domestic team information
- Years: Team
- 2002–2006: Worcestershire County Cricket club
- 1999–2002: Herefordshire
- 1999–2000: Worcestershire Cricket Board

Career statistics
| Competition | LA |
|---|---|
| Matches | 8 |
| Runs scored | 218 |
| Batting average | 31.14 |
| 100s/50s | –/1 |
| Top score | 66 |
| Balls bowled | 120 |
| Wickets | 2 |
| Bowling average | 51.00 |
| 5 wickets in innings | – |
| 10 wickets in match | – |
| Best bowling | 2/28 |
| Catches/stumpings | 2/– |
- Source: Cricinfo, 3 November 2010

Nathan William Round (born 21 August 1980) is a former English cricketer. Round was a right-handed batsman who bowled right-arm medium pace. He was born at Stourbridge, Worcestershire.

Round made his debut in County Cricket for Herefordshire in the 1999 Minor Counties Championship against Berkshire. From 1999 to 2001, he represented the county in 14 Championship matches, the last of which came against Devon. He also represented the county in the MCCA Knockout Trophy, making his debut against Shropshire. From 2000 to 2001, he represented the county in 8 Trophy matches, the last of which came against the Worcestershire Cricket Board.

It was while playing for Herefordshire that he made his List A debut representing the Worcestershire Cricket Board against the Kent Cricket Board in the 1999 NatWest Trophy. The following year he made his Herefordshire List A debut 2000 NatWest Trophy against the Sussex Cricket Board. From 2000 to 2002, he represented the county in 5 List A matches, the last of which came against Suffolk in the 2nd round of the 2002 Cheltenham & Gloucester Trophy which was played in 2001. The following season he played List A cricket for the Worcestershire Cricket Board against Dorset in the 1st round of the 2003 Cheltenham & Gloucester Trophy which was played in 2002. His final match in List A cricket came for the Board against Worcestershire in the 3rd round of the 2003 Cheltenham & Gloucester Trophy It was during this period that he signed a professional contract with Worcestershire county cricket club for whom he represented for 4 years before moving to local rivals Warwickshire. Round also represented England U19s in 1999 and later went on to be an overseas player for Fish Hoek cricket club in Cape Town South Africa where he played for 5 seasons.

In his combined total of 8 List A matches, he scored 218 runs at a batting average of 31.14, with a single half century high score of 66. In the field he took 2 catches. With the ball he took 2 wickets at a bowling average of 51.00, with best figures of 2/28.
