= Simon Williams (cricketer) =

English cricketer

Personal information
- Full name: Simon Lee Williams
- Born: 3 September 1970 (age 56); Lambeth, London, England
- Batting: Right-handed
- Role: Wicketkeeper

Domestic team information
- Years: Team
- 1999–2000: Kent Cricket Board
- 1992–1997: Cambridgeshire

Career statistics
Competition	LA
Matches	8
Runs scored	152
Batting average	25.33
100s/50s	–/–
Top score	45*
Balls bowled	–
Wickets	–
Bowling average	–
5 wickets in innings	–
10 wickets in match	–
Best bowling	–
Catches/stumpings	4/–
- Source: Cricinfo, 13 November 2010

Simon Lee Williams (born 3 September 1970) is a former English cricketer. Williams was a right-handed batsman who played primarily as a wicketkeeper. He was born in Lambeth, London.

== Career ==
Williams made his Minor Counties Championship debut for Cambridgeshire against Bedfordshire in 1992. From 1992 to 1997, he represented the county in 16 Championship matches, the last of which came against Buckinghamshire. Williams made his MCCA Knockout Trophy debut for the county in 1993 against Suffolk. From 1993 to 1997, he represented the county in 14 Trophy matches, the last of which came against Dorset. It was for Cambridgeshire that he made his debut in List A cricket. He played 2 List A matches for the county, the first of which came against Derbyshire in the 1995 NatWest Trophy and the second of which came against Kent in the 1996 NatWest Trophy.

Williams later represented the Kent Cricket Board in List A cricket. His debut match for the Board in that format came against Denmark in the 1999 NatWest Trophy. From 1999 to 2000, he represented the Board in 6 List A matches, the last of which came against Hampshire in the 2000 NatWest Trophy. In his combined career total of 8 List A matches, he scored 152 runs at a batting average of 25.33, with a high score of 45*. Behind the stumps he took 4 catches.
