= Chris Seal =

English cricketer

Personal information
- Full name: Christopher Peter Seal
- Born: 25 July 1973 (age 53); Minster-in-Thanet, Kent, England
- Batting: Left-handed
- Bowling: Left-arm medium

Domestic team information
- Years: Team
- 1997–2005: Suffolk

Career statistics
Competition	List A
Matches	7
Runs scored	100
Batting average	25.00
100s/50s	–/–
Top score	41
Balls bowled	86
Wickets	2
Bowling average	39.50
5 wickets in innings	–
10 wickets in match	–
Best bowling	1/6
Catches/stumpings	–/–
- Source: Cricinfo, 5 July 2011

Christopher Peter Seal (born 25 July 1973) is a former English cricketer. Seal was a left-handed batsman who bowled left-arm medium pace. He was born in Minster-in-Thanet, Kent.

Seal made his debut for Suffolk in the 1997 Minor Counties Championship against Lincolnshire. Seal played Minor counties cricket for Suffolk from 1997 to 2005, which included 41 Minor Counties Championship appearances and 20 MCCA Knockout Trophy matches. He made his List A debut against the Hampshire Cricket Board in the 1999 NatWest Trophy. He made 6 further List A appearances, the last of which came against Herefordshire in the 2nd round of the 2001 Cheltenham & Gloucester Trophy, which was played in 2001. In his 7 List A matches, he scored 100 runs at an average of 25.00, with a high score of 41. With the ball, he took 2 wickets at a bowling average of 39.50, with best figures of 1/6.
