= Paul Gover =

English cricketer (born 1968)

Paul Nicholas Gover
Personal information
- Born: 12 March 1968 (age 58); Oxford, Oxfordshire, England
- Batting: Left-handed

Domestic team information
- Years: Team
- 2001–2002: Hampshire Cricket Board

Career statistics
| Competition | List A |
|---|---|
| Matches | 3 |
| Runs scored | 44 |
| Batting average | 13.66 |
| 100s/50s | 0/0 |
| Top score | 34 |
| Catches/stumpings | 2/– |
- Source: Cricinfo, 29 December 2009

Paul Nicholas Gover (born 12 March 1968) is a former English cricketer. He is a left-handed batsman who played for the Hampshire Cricket Board. He was born at Oxford in 1968.

Gover made his Second XI debut for Hampshire in 1988, playing in the competition until 1994. He played for the Hampshire Cricket Board in the Minor Counties Trophy between 1998 and 2002, and made three List-A appearances for the side, between 2001 and 2002. In three List-A innings, Gover scored 44 runs, including a top score of 34 on his debut performance, against Ireland. His final List-A appearance came against Staffordshire in the 2nd Round of 2003 Cheltenham & Gloucester Trophy, which was played in 2002.

Between 2002 and 2008, Gover played for Havant Cricket Club in the Southern Premier League and Cockspur Cup, a competition in which the side reached the semi-final in 2005. Following his playing career he has worked as Head of Cricket at Winchester College.
