= Robert Brooks (cricketer) =

English cricketer

Personal information
- Full name: Robert David Brooks
- Born: 14 September 1970 (age 56); Truro, Cornwall, England
- Batting: Left-handed
- Role: Wicket-keeper

Domestic team information
- Years: Team
- 1997–2004: Oxfordshire

Career statistics
Competition	List A
Matches	2
Runs scored	37
Batting average	18.50
100s/50s	–/–
Top score	23
Balls bowled	–
Wickets	–
Bowling average	–
5 wickets in innings	–
10 wickets in match	–
Best bowling	–
Catches/stumpings	1/–
- Source: Cricinfo, 20 May 2011

Robert David Brooks (born 14 September 1970) is a former English cricketer. Brooks was a left-handed batsman who fielded as a wicket-keeper. He was born in Truro, Cornwall.

Brooks made his debut for Oxfordshire in the 1997 Minor Counties Championship against Herefordshire. Brooks played Minor counties cricket for Oxfordshire from 1997 to 2004, which included 11 Minor Counties Championship matches and 2 MCCA Knockout Trophy matches. He made his List A debut against Wales Minor Counties in the 2000 NatWest Trophy. He played his second and final List A match against Huntingdonshire in the 2001 Cheltenham & Gloucester Trophy. In his 2 List A matches he scored 37 runs at a batting average of 18.50, with a high score of 23.
