= Ben Nolan =

English cricketer (born 1983)

Personal information
- Full name: Benjamin Peter Francis Nolan-Stone
- Born: 13 May 1983 (age 43); Poole, Dorset, England
- Height: 6 ft 1 in (1.85 m)
- Batting: Right-handed
- Bowling: Right-arm fast-medium

Domestic team information
- Years: Team
- 2001: Hampshire Cricket Board
- Source: Cricinfo, 28 December 2009

Benjamin Peter Francis Nolan-Stone (born 13 May 1983) is a former English cricketer. Nolan was a right-handed batsman who bowled right-arm fast-medium. He was born at Poole, Dorset in 1983.

Nolan made a single List A appearance for the Hampshire Cricket Board in the first Round of the 2001 Cheltenham and Gloucester Trophy against the Kent Cricket Board. Only two overs of play were possible in the match and Nolan was not required to bat, bowl or field as Kent Cricket Board won on a bowl out.

Nolan made a single appearance in the 2005 Second Eleven Championship for Hampshire Second XI against Warwickshire Second XI.
