= Kashif Ibrahim =

Cricket player (born 1977)

Personal information
- Full name: Kashif Ibrahim اردو: کاشف ابراہیم
- Born: 16 November 1977 (age 48); Karachi, Sindh Province, Pakistan
- Batting: Right-handed
- Bowling: Right-arm medium

Domestic team information
- Years: Team
- 2000: Sussex Cricket Board
- 1999/00: Pakistan National Shipping Corporation
- 1998/99: Karachi Blues
- 1997/98-1998/99: Karachi
- 1996/97-2000/01: Karachi Whites

Career statistics
Competition	FC	LA
Matches	30	17
Runs scored	477	226
Batting average	16.44	45.20
100s/50s	–/–	–/2
Top score	48	63
Balls bowled	4,093	724
Wickets	74	22
Bowling average	27.14	28.45
5 wickets in innings	5	–
10 wickets in match	–	–
Best bowling	5/25	3/28
Catches/stumpings	7/–	4/–
- Source: Cricinfo, 16 October 2010

Kashif Ibrahim (born 16 November 1977) is a former Pakistani cricketer. Ibrahim was a right-handed batsman who bowled right-arm medium pace. He was born at Karachi, Sindh Province.

Ibrahim made his first-class debut for Karachi Whites against Rawalpindi in 1996/97 season. Ibrahim represented Karachi Whites in 17 first-class matches, Karachi in a single and Karachi Blues in 3. He also represented Pakistan National Shipping Corporation in 9 first-class matches between 1999/00. In final first-class match came in the 2000/01 season for Karachi Whites against Rawalpindi. In total, from 1996/97 to 2000/01 he played 30 first-class matches. In these matches he scored a total of 447 runs at a batting average of 16.44, with high score of 48. With the ball he took 74 wickets at a bowling average of 27.14, with 5 five wicket hauls, one of which resulted in his best figures of 5/25.

Ibrahim also made his debut in List A cricket for Karachi Blues in the 1996/97 season against Bahawalpur. Ibrahim represented the 3 Karachi teams in List A cricket 11 times from the 1996/97 to 1998/99 season. In addition, he also represented Pakistan National Shipping Corporation in 4 matches during the 1999/00 season. His final List-A match in Pakistan came for the Corporation against Pakistan International Airlines in September 1999. During the 2000 English cricket season, Ibrahim played a 2 List A matches for the Sussex Cricket Board in the 2000 NatWest Trophy against Herefordshire. and Berkshire, which marked his final List A match. In his total of 17 List A matches, he scored 226 runs at an average of 45.20, with a 2 half centuries and a high score of 63. With the ball he took 22 wickets at an average of 28.45, with a best figures of 3/28.
