= Shrewsbury Road, Shifnal =

Cricket ground in England

Coordinates: 52°40′01.03″N 2°22′51.78″W

Shrewsbury Road
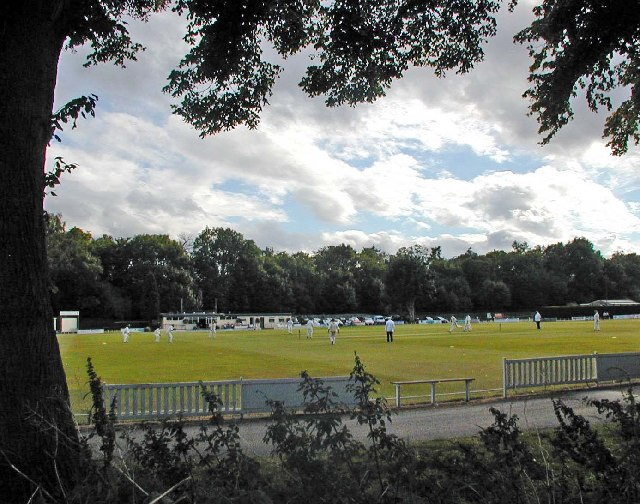

Ground information
- Location: Shifnal, Shropshire
- Establishment: 1900 (first recorded match)

Team information
Shropshire	(1987-present)
- As of 15 August 2010; Source: Ground profile

Shrewsbury Road is a cricket ground in Shifnal, Shropshire, England. The first recorded match on the ground was in 1900, when Shifnal played Wolverhampton. Shropshire played their first Minor Counties Championship match at the ground against Cornwall in 1987. From 1987 to present, the ground has hosted 14 Minor Counties Championship matches and 2 MCCA Knockout Trophy matches.

The ground has also held 2 List-A matches. The first saw Shropshire play the Surrey Cricket Board in the 2000 NatWest Trophy. The second saw Shropshire play Oxfordshire in the 2002 Cheltenham & Gloucester Trophy which was played in 2001.
