= Garri Jones =

English cricketer

Personal information
- Full name: Garri Wyn Jones
- Born: 1 May 1970 (age 56); Birmingham, Warwickshire, England
- Batting: Left-handed
- Bowling: Right-arm off break
- Relatives: Robin Jones (brother)

Domestic team information
- Years: Team
- 1991–1994: Cambridge University

Career statistics
Competition	First-class
Matches	27
Runs scored	729
Batting average	16.56
100s/50s	–/1
Top score	74
Catches/stumpings	2/–
- Source: Cricinfo, 12 January 2022

Garri Wyn Jones (born 1 May 1970) is an English former first-class cricketer.

Jones was born at Birmingham in May 1970. He was educated at The King's School in Chester, before going up to Caius College, Cambridge. While studying at Cambridge, he played first-class cricket for Cambridge University Cricket Club from 1995 to 1998, making 18 appearances. Playing as an opening batsman in the Cambridge side, Jones scored 729 runs in his 27 matches at an average of 16.56. He made one half century score of 74, which came against Essex. His brother, Robin, was also a first-class cricketer.
