= Peter Trend =

English cricketer (born 1974)

Personal information
- Full name: Peter Charles Trend
- Born: 24 August 1974 (age 52); Wolverhampton, Staffordshire, England
- Batting: Right-handed
- Role: Wicket-keeper

Domestic team information
- Years: Team
- 1997–2000: Lincolnshire

Career statistics
Competition	List A
Matches	5
Runs scored	94
Batting average	18.80
100s/50s	–/1
Top score	52
Balls bowled	–
Wickets	–
Bowling average	–
5 wickets in innings	–
10 wickets in match	–
Best bowling	–
Catches/stumpings	5/1
- Source: Cricinfo, 24 June 2011

Peter Charles Trend (born 24 August 1974) is a former English cricketer. Trend was a right-handed batsman who fielded as a wicket-keeper. He was born in Wolverhampton, Staffordshire.

Trend made his debut for Lincolnshire in the 1997 MCCA Knockout Trophy against Hertfordshire. Trend played Minor counties cricket for Lincolnshire from 1997 to 2000, which included 32 Minor Counties Championship matches and 16 MCCA Knockout Trophy matches. He made his List A debut against Derbyshire in the 1997 NatWest Trophy. He played 4 further List A matches for Lincolnshire, the last coming against Lancashire in the 2000 NatWest Trophy. In his 5 matches, he scored 94 runs at an average of 18.00, while behind the stumps he took 5 catches and made a single stumping. He scored his only half century when he made 53 against the Netherlands in the 2000 NatWest Trophy.
