= Stephen Ball =

English cricketer

Personal information
- Full name: Stephen Ball
- Born: 5 May 1965 (age 61); Brandon, County Durham, England
- Batting: Left-handed
- Bowling: Right-arm medium

Domestic team information
- Years: Team
- 1999–2000: Durham Cricket Board
- 1989–1990: Durham

Career statistics
| Competition | LA |
|---|---|
| Matches | 6 |
| Runs scored | 80 |
| Batting average | 13.33 |
| 100s/50s | –/– |
| Top score | 23 |
| Balls bowled | 246 |
| Wickets | 7 |
| Bowling average | 30.14 |
| 5 wickets in innings | – |
| 10 wickets in match | – |
| Best bowling | 3/45 |
| Catches/stumpings | –/– |
- Source: Cricinfo, 7 November 2010

Stephen Ball (born 5 May 1965) is a former English cricketer. Ball was a left-handed batsman who bowled right-arm medium pace. He was born at Brandon, County Durham.

Ball made his debut in County Cricket for Durham in the 1989 Minor Counties Championship against Suffolk. He played one further Championship match for Durham, which came against Cambridgeshire in 1990.

Ball later represented the Durham Cricket Board in List A cricket. His debut List A match came against Oxfordshire in the 1999 NatWest Trophy. From 1999 to 2000, he represented the county in 6 List A matches, the last of which came against Northamptonshire in the 2000 NatWest Trophy. In his 6 List A matches, he scored 80 runs at a batting average of 13.33, with a high score of 23. With the ball he took 7 wickets at a bowling average of 30.14, with best figures of 3/45.
