= Ryan Horrell =

English cricketer (born 1973)

Personal information
- Full name: Ryan Horrell
- Born: 7 April 1973 (age 53); Barnstaple, Devon, England
- Batting: Left-handed
- Bowling: Slow left-arm orthodox

Domestic team information
- Years: Team
- 1991–2000: Devon

Career statistics
Competition	List A
Matches	3
Runs scored	25
Batting average	25.00
100s/50s	0/0
Top score	25*
Balls bowled	96
Wickets	2
Bowling average	35.00
5 wickets in innings	0
10 wickets in match	0
Best bowling	1/33
Catches/stumpings	0/–
- Source: Cricinfo, 6 February 2011

Ryan Horrell (born 7 April 1973) is a former English cricketer. Horrell was a left-handed batsman who bowled slow left-arm orthodox. He was born in Barnstaple, Devon.

Horrell made his debut for Devon in 1991 against Oxfordshire in the Minor Counties Championship. From 1991 to 2000, he represented Devon in 21 Championship matches, the last of which came against Cheshire. The season following his debut, he made his debut MCCA Knockout Trophy for the county against Cornwall. From 1992 to 2000, he represented the county in just 5 Trophy matches, the last of which came against Wiltshire. Horrell made his List A debut for Devon against Essex in the 1st round of the 1996 NatWest Trophy. His next List A appearance came four years later against Staffordshire in the 2nd round of the 2000 NatWest Trophy, with his final List A match coming in the following round against Surrey. In his 3 List A matches, he scored 25 runs at a batting average of 25.00, with a high score of 25*. With the ball he took 2 wickets at a bowling average of 35.00, with best figures of 1/33.

He also played Second XI cricket for the Gloucestershire Second XI (1991–1993) and the Somerset Second XI (1995–1996).
