= Alistair Tapp =

English cricketer

Alistair Tapp (born 9 March 1964) was an English cricketer. He was a right-handed batsman and slow left-arm bowler who played for Cambridgeshire. He was born in St. Peter Port.

Tapp, who represented Cambridgeshire in the Minor Counties Championship and the 38-County Cup between 1999 and 2000, made two List A appearances for the team, during the 2000 NatWest Trophy. In his debut, he took three wickets.

In his second appearance, two weeks later, he scored 4 runs from the tailend, in a heavy defeat at the hands of Cumberland.
