= Stephen Brogan (cricketer) =

English cricketer and entrepreneur

Personal information
- Full name: Stephen Michael Brogan
- Born: 24 September 1969 (age 57); Worksop, Nottinghamshire, England
- Batting: Right-handed

Domestic team information
- Years: Team
- 2002–2003: Berkshire
- 1999–2000: Nottinghamshire Cricket Board
- 1992–1999: Herefordshire

Career statistics
Competition	LA
Matches	3
Runs scored	104
Batting average	34.66
100s/50s	–/1
Top score	61
Balls bowled	–
Wickets	–
Bowling average	–
5 wickets in innings	–
10 wickets in match	–
Best bowling	–
Catches/stumpings	–/–
- Source: Cricinfo, 23 November 2010

Stephen Michael Brogan (born 24 September 1969) is a former English cricketer and entrepreneur. He was born in Worksop, Nottinghamshire and now resides in Ascot, Berkshire.

== Cricket career ==
Brogan is a right-handed batsman, who spent two seasons on the staff at Nottinghamshire from 1990 to 1991. He made his debut in county cricket for Herefordshire in the 1992 Minor Counties Championship against Devon. From 1992 to 1999, he represented the county in 28 Championship matches, scoring two centuries with a top score of 105 not out against Dorset in 1995. His MCCA Knockout Trophy debut for the county came against Norfolk in 1995. From 1995 to 1996, he represented the county in 6 Trophy matches, including the 1995 Trophy Final against Cambridgeshire, where he made an unbeaten 60 in a narrow defeat. It was for Herefordshire that he made his debut in List A cricket, which came against Durham in the 1995 NatWest Trophy.

He later captained the Nottinghamshire Cricket Board in 2 List A matches against Scotland in the 1999 NatWest Trophy and the Gloucestershire Cricket Board in the 1st round of the 2000 NatWest Trophy. In his total of 3 List A match he scored 104 runs at a batting average of 34.66, with a single half century high score of 61.

Brogan joined Berkshire in 2002, making his debut for the county in the 2002 Minor Counties Championship against Wales Minor Counties. From 2002 to 2003, he represented the county in 4 Championship matches, the last of which came against Oxfordshire. In 2002, he played 2 MCCA Knockout Trophy matches for the county against the Middlesex Cricket Board and Oxfordshire.

== Business career ==
After graduating Sheffield Hallam University in 1994, Brogan pursued a business career with Bass and S&N. He was short-listed in The Drinks Business prestigious “On-Trade Business Person of the Year Award 2007″, where he finished runner-up.

Following his departure from S&N's wholesale subsidiary, WaverleyTBS, in April 2008, Brogan was inspired to start his own business and Interbev UK Ltd was set up in August 2008.

"Initially set up to provide consultancy services to SMEs within the drinks market, in January 2009 the business started trading and eventually exited consultancy to focus fully on becoming a domestic and international wholesale business, specialising in recognised drinks brands".

Brogan's success with Interbev has led to a number of award nominations, including winners of 2010 Service Business of the Year in the UK Startup Awards and shortlisted in the 2011 International Business of the Year in the Fast Growth Business Awards. Interbev grew to have turnover of over £60m in 2016 but in late 2017 the company entered administration with HMRC regulation cited as having affected turnover.

In August 2013, Brogan took a controlling interest in Ooberstock Ltd, a national drinks distributor to the UK on-premise sector.
