= Lee Nurse =

English cricketer (1976–2020)

Personal information
- Full name: Lee Harvey Nurse
- Born: 24 December 1976; Basingstoke, Hampshire, England
- Died: 9 April 2020 (aged 43); Basingstoke, Hampshire, England
- Batting: Right-handed
- Relatives: Seymour Nurse (great-uncle)

Domestic team information
- Years: Team
- 1997–2006: Berkshire

Career statistics
Competition	List A
Matches	7
Runs scored	182
Batting average	26.00
100s/50s	0/1
Top score	81
Catches/stumpings	3/–
- Source: Cricinfo, 10 April 2020

Lee Harvey Nurse (24 December 1976 – 9 April 2020) was an English cricketer.

The son of Leon Nurse, he was born at Basingstoke in December 1976. Nurse made his debut in minor counties cricket for Berkshire in the 1997 Minor Counties Championship against Dorset at Reading. He played for Berkshire until 2006, playing a total of 29 matches in the Minor Counties Championship and fifteen matches in the MCCA Knockout Trophy, which included one match for the Derbyshire Cricket Board in 1998 when he was having trials at Derbyshire County Cricket Club. While playing for Berkshire, he played for the county in matches that held List A status in the domestic county one-day competition, making his List A debut against the Sussex Cricket Board at Hastings in the 2000 NatWest Trophy. He made a further six List A appearances for Berkshire, the last coming against first-class opposition in the form of Durham in the 2003 Cheltenham & Gloucester Trophy. His six List A matches yielded 182 runs at an average of 26.00 and a high score of 81.

He died on 9 April 2020 at the Basingstoke and North Hampshire Hospital during the coronavirus pandemic. His great-uncle, Seymour Nurse, played Test cricket for the West Indies.
