= Chris Nevin =

New Zealand cricketer (born 1975)

Personal information
- Full name: Christopher John Nevin
- Born: 3 August 1975 (age 51); Dunedin, Otago
- Batting: Right-handed
- Role: Wicket-keeper

International information
- National side: New Zealand (2000–2003)
- ODI debut (cap 114): 1 March 2000 v Australia
- Last ODI: 15 November 2003 v India
- ODI shirt no.: 30

Career statistics
Competition	ODI	FC	LA	T20
Matches	37	112	187	37
Runs scored	732	5,058	4,481	504
Batting average	20.33	34.64	26.83	19.38
100s/50s	0/4	4/28	5/24	0/1
Top score	74	143*	149	87*
Balls bowled	0	6	18	0
Wickets	–	0	0	–
Bowling average	–	–	–	–
5 wickets in innings	–	–	–	–
10 wickets in match	–	–	–	–
Best bowling	–	–	–	–
Catches/stumpings	16/3	304/9	189/18	13/7
- Source: Cricinfo, 27 October 2016

Christopher John Nevin (born 3 August 1975) is a former New Zealand cricketer, who played 37 One Day Internationals for New Zealand. Nevin was a member of the New Zealand team that won the 2000 ICC KnockOut Trophy.

== Domestic career ==
His entire state career has been played out with the Wellington Firebirds, as a wicketkeeper-batsman, normally opening the batting in one-day games.

He also briefly represented the Hampshire Cricket Board side in the Natwest Trophy, having played 4 seasons of club cricket in England for the Liphook and Ripsley Cricket Club.

== See also ==
- List of Hampshire Cricket Board List A players
