= Liphook and Ripsley Cricket Club =

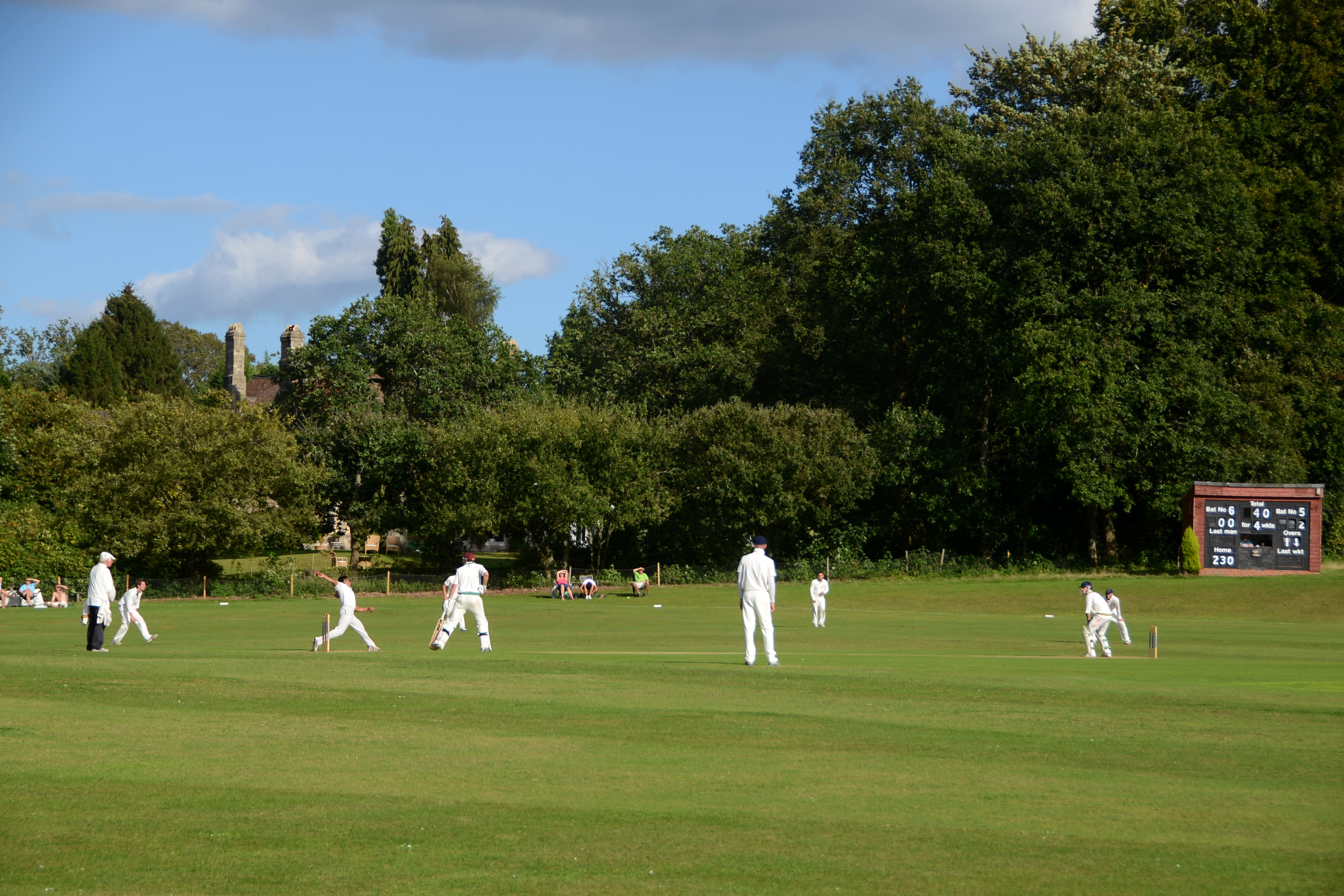
A game between Liphook and Ripsley CC and an I Anson representative eleven in 2014. Ripsley House behind the overgrown hedge.

Liphook and Ripsley Cricket Club is a cricket club in England for adults and juniors, and is a member of the Southern Premier Cricket League.

The Ripsley House ground is in West Sussex, near the Forest Mere health resort, although Liphook village is actually in Hampshire.

New Zealand and Wellington Firebirds wicket keeper Chris Nevin played for four seasons at the club in the late 1990s. Mayu Pasupati is another Firebird player to represent the club. For the 2014 season, Harry Munt was appointed 1st team captain. He has remained as captain until the present day.

The club reached the National Village Cup final in 2018, but were beaten at Lord's by Folkton and Flixton by 72 runs.
