= Kristian Adams =

English cricketer

Personal information
- Full name: Kristian Adams
- Born: 26 November 1976 (age 49); Cleethorpes, Lincolnshire
- Batting: Right-handed
- Bowling: Left-arm medium-fast
- Role: Bowler

Domestic team information
- Years: Team
- 1997–2004: Lincolnshire
- 2000: Kent
- FC debut: 23 May 2000 Kent v Surrey
- LA debut: 21 May 2000 Kent v Leicestershire

Career statistics
Competition	First-class	List A
Matches	1	9
Runs scored	–	11
Batting average	–	3.66
100s/50s	–	0/0
Top score	–	6*
Balls bowled	132	415
Wickets	2	15
Bowling average	29.00	18.60
5 wickets in innings	0	1
10 wickets in match	0	0
Best bowling	2/58	6/24
Catches/stumpings	0/–	0/–
- Source: CricInfo, 7 May 2016

Kristian Adams (born 26 November 1976) is a former English professional cricketer who played for Kent County Cricket Club and Lincolnshire County Cricket Club as a bowler between 1997 and 2004. He was born at Cleethorpes in Lincolnshire in 1976.

== Cricket career ==
Adams first played for Lincolnshire County Cricket Club age-group teams during the 1994 season and made his Minor Counties Championship debut for the team in 1997. He appeared for Leicestershire's Second XI once during the 1996 season and between 1997 and 1999 was a member of the MCC Young Cricketers team. He played for the Second XI's of Sussex and Hampshire during 1998 and was signed by Kent ahead of the 1999 season after "impressing" in a trial match before the start of the season; he played for the county's Second XI during the season.

A left-arm swing bowler who moved the ball in towards the batsman, and bowled "with a degree of all-round menace", Adams signed a new contract with Kent in October 1999. He made his debut for the Kent First XI in May 2000, taking four wickets against Leicestershire, including three in his first 11 balls in top-level cricket, a performance which saw him "steal the show" according to The Times. A few days late, Adams took two first-class wickets in his only County Championship match, including that of England Test batsman Graham Thorpe, in a display of "youthful hostility" that Jack Bailey, writing in The Times, felt "augur[ed] well for the future".

Although this was his only first-class match, Adams played in eight List A matches during the season, taking 14 wickets, including best figures of six wickets for 24 runs against Cumberland in the 2000 NatWest Trophy. The performance earned him the player of the match award. Despite the optimism of Ivo Tennant, who felt that in Adams Kent may have "found a left-arm seamer of note", and some "thrilling" one-day bowling spells during his debut season, he did not play for the First XI during the 2001 season and was released by Kent at the end of the season.

After leaving Kent Adams played once for Leicestershire's Second XI during the 2002 season whilst playing club cricket for Bracebridge Heath Cricket Club in the Nottinghamshire Premier League. He played Minor Counties cricket for Lincolnshire in both 2003 and 2004 after having moved to play club cricket for Grimsby Town CC in the Lincolnshire Premier League, taking a new league record 67 wickets during his first season with the club. Described as a "prolific wicket taker" in club cricket, he later moved to play for Cleethorpes Cricket Club in the Yorkshire Premier League and Yorkshire Southern Premier League until 2016.

== Bibliography ==
- Ellis, Clive; Pennell, Mark (2010). Trophies and Tribulations: Forty Years of Kent Cricket. London: Greenwich Publishing. ISBN 978-09-56408-10-5.
