= Christopher Finegan =

English cricketer

Personal information
- Full name: Christopher Charles Finegan
- Born: 4 November 1971 (age 55); Liverpool, Merseyside, England
- Batting: Right-handed
- Bowling: Right-arm fast medium

Domestic team information
- Years: Team
- 1998–2009: Cheshire

Career statistics
Competition	List A
Matches	5
Runs scored	15
Batting average	5.00
100s/50s	–/–
Top score	11
Balls bowled	294
Wickets	11
Bowling average	15.90
5 wickets in innings	–
10 wickets in match	–
Best bowling	3/31
Catches/stumpings	–/–
- Source: Cricinfo, 10 April 2011

Christopher Charles Finegan (born 4 November 1971) is a former English cricketer. Finegan was a right-handed batsman who bowled right-arm fast medium pace. He was born in Liverpool, Merseyside. Finegan is playing club cricket for Neston CC since 2004 in the Cheshire County Premier League.

Finegan made his debut for Cheshire in the 1998 Minor Counties Championship against the Oxfordshire. Finegan played Minor counties cricket for Cheshire from 1998 to 2009, including 43 Minor Counties Championship matches and 14 MCCA Knockout Trophy matches. In 1999, he made his List A debut against the Surrey Cricket Board in the NatWest Trophy. He played four further List A matches for Cheshire, the last coming against Lincolnshire 2nd round of the 2003 Cheltenham & Gloucester Trophy which was held in 2002. In his five List A matches, he took 11 wickets at a bowling average of 15.90, with best figures of 3/31. His best bowling figures came against in two matches, his debut against the Surrey Cricket Board and against Lincolnshire in the 2000 NatWest Trophy.
