= Adam Heather =

English cricketer (born 1972)

Personal information
- Full name: Adam Tom Heather
- Born: 7 November 1972 (age 54); Manchester, Lancashire, England
- Batting: Left-handed

Domestic team information
- Years: Team
- 1996–2007: Northumberland

Career statistics
Competition	List A
Matches	5
Runs scored	138
Batting average	27.60
100s/50s	–/1
Top score	79
Balls bowled	–
Wickets	–
Bowling average	–
5 wickets in innings	–
10 wickets in match	–
Best bowling	–
Catches/stumpings	1/–
- Source: Cricinfo, 17 May 2011

Adam Tom Heather (born 7 November 1972) is an English cricketer. Heather is a left-handed batsman. He was born in Manchester, Lancashire.

Heather made his debut for Northumberland in the 1996 Minor Counties Championship against Staffordshire. Heather played Minor counties cricket for Northumberland from 1996 to 2007, which included 53 Minor Counties Championship matches and 20 MCCA Knockout Trophy matches. In 1999, he made his List A debut against Ireland in the NatWest Trophy. He made 4 further List A appearances for the county, the last coming against Middlesex in the 2005 Cheltenham & Gloucester Trophy. In his 5 List A matches, he scored 138 runs at a batting average of 27.60, with a high score of 79. This came against the Northamptonshire Cricket Board in the 2000 NatWest Trophy.
