= Mathew Theedom =

English cricketer (born 1977)

Personal information
- Full name: Mathew Christopher Theedom
- Born: 1 October 1977 (age 49); Exeter, Devon, England
- Batting: Right-handed
- Bowling: Right-arm fast-medium
- Relatives: James Theedom (son)

Domestic team information
- Years: Team
- 1996–2002: Devon

Career statistics
Competition	List A
Matches	4
Runs scored	28
Batting average	19.00
100s/50s	–/–
Top score	28
Balls bowled	150
Wickets	5
Bowling average	25.00
5 wickets in innings	1
10 wickets in match	–
Best bowling	5/18
Catches/stumpings	–/–
- Source: Cricinfo, 6 February 2011

Mathew Christopher Theedom (born 1 October 1977) is an English cricketer. Theedom is a right-handed batsman who bowls right-arm fast-medium. He was born in Exeter, Devon.

Theedom made his debut for Devon in 1996 against Herefordshire in the Minor Counties Championship. From 1996 to 2002, he represented Devon in 22 Championship matches, the last of which came against Shropshire. Three years later he made his debut MCCA Knockout Trophy appearance for the county against the Gloucestershire Cricket Board. From 1999 to 2002, he represented the county in 6 Trophy matches, the last of which came against Dorset. In the same season as he made his MCCA Knockout Trophy debut, Theedom also made his List A debut for Devon against Worcestershire in the 3rd round of the 1999 NatWest Trophy. The following season, against Staffordshire in the 2nd round of the 2000 NatWest Trophy, he took all his List A wickets in a single go to record his only five wicket haul in the format. From 1999 to 2002, he played in 4 List A matches, the last of which came against Yorkshire in the 3rd round of the 2002 Cheltenham & Gloucester Trophy. In his 4 List A matches, he scored 28 runs at a batting average of 28.00, with a high score of 19*. With the ball he took 5 wickets at a bowling average of 25.00.

He also played Second XI cricket for the Somerset Second XI in 1999.
