= Charles Forward =

English cricketer (born 1969)

Personal information
- Full name: Charles Heaton Forward
- Born: 13 June 1969 (age 57); Romsey, Hampshire, England
- Batting: Left-handed

Domestic team information
- Years: Team
- 2002: Hampshire Cricket Board

Career statistics
Competition	LA
Matches	1
Runs scored	20
Batting average	20.00
100s/50s	–/–
Top score	20
Balls bowled	–
Wickets	–
Bowling average	–
5 wickets in innings	–
10 wickets in match	–
Best bowling	–
Catches/stumpings	–/–
- Source: Cricinfo, 29 December 2009

Charles Forward (born 13 June 1969) is an English cricketer. He is a left-handed batsman who played for Hampshire second XI, Hampshire Cricket Board and Marylebone Cricket Club.

== Personal life ==
Forward was born in Romsey, Hampshire. He is married with two children. He qualified as an accountant in 2001 while working for Ernst & Young. In about 2010, they moved to live in Sar, Bahrain.

== Cricket career ==
Forward was a promising junior cricketer and represented Hampshire Under-19s in 1987. He went on to play for Hampshire second XI in the Second XI Championship and Second XI Trophy in 1990.

As a playing member of Marylebone Cricket Club, Forward went on tours of Namibia in 2001, and Nepal in 2003. In Namibia, he made nine appearances for the side, five of which came against the Namibia national cricket team.

Forward played club cricket for Old Tauntonians & Romsey and was selected in the Southern Cricket League representative side. He made his solitary List-A appearance for Hampshire Cricket Board in September 2002.
