= Stephen Foster (cricketer) =

English cricketer

Personal information
- Full name: Stephen John Foster
- Born: 21 February 1968 (age 58); Rotherham, Yorkshire, England
- Batting: Right-handed
- Bowling: Right-arm medium

Domestic team information
- Years: Team
- 2006: Cumberland
- 2001-2002: Yorkshire Cricket Board
- 2000: Northumberland
- 1999: Yorkshire Cricket Board

Career statistics
Competition	LA
Matches	9
Runs scored	133
Batting average	16.62
100s/50s	–/–
Top score	44
Balls bowled	498
Wickets	25
Bowling average	10.24
5 wickets in innings	3
10 wickets in match	–
Best bowling	6/52
Catches/stumpings	5/–
- Source: Cricinfo, 5 November 2010

Stephen John Foster (born 21 February 1968) is a former English cricketer. Foster was a right-handed batsman who bowled right-arm medium pace. He was born in Rotherham, Yorkshire.

Foster made his debut in List A cricket for the Yorkshire Cricket Board against the Gloucestershire Cricket Board 1999 NatWest Trophy.

In 2000, he joined Northumberland. Playing for the county for just the 2000 season, Foster made his Minor Counties Championship debut for the county against Hertfordshire. He played 3 further Championship matches for the county, the last of which came against Cambridgeshire. During the 2000 season, he also represented the county in 3 List A matches in the 2000 NatWest Trophy against the Northamptonshire Cricket Board, Bedfordshire and Leicestershire. He was the leading wicket taker in that seasons NatWest Trophy.

In 2001, he returned to playing List A cricket for the Yorkshire Cricket Board. From 2001 to 2002, he represented the Board in 4 further List A matches, the last of which came against Somerset in the 2002 Cheltenham & Gloucester Trophy. In his career total of 9 List A matches, he scored 133 runs at a batting average of 16.62, with a high score of 44. In the field he took 5 catches. With the ball he took 25 wickets at a remarkable bowling average of 10.24, with 3 five wicket hauls and best figures of 6/52.

Foster joined Cumberland in 2006, where he played a single MCCA Knockout Trophy match against Shropshire. In February 2020, he was named in England's squad for the Over-50s Cricket World Cup in South Africa. However, the tournament was cancelled during the third round of matches due to the coronavirus pandemic.
