= Pontarddulais Park =

Cricket ground in Pontarddulaid, Glamorgan

Coordinates: 51°43′00.58″N 4°02′18.03″W

Ground information
- Location: Pontarddulais, WestGlamorgan
- Establishment: 1976

Team information
Wales Minor Counties	(1992–present)
- As of 1 July 2010; Source: Ground profile

Pontarddulais Park is a cricket ground in Pontarddulais, Glamorgan. The ground was established in 1976, when Pontarddulais Cricket Club played Glamorgan in a friendly. From 1992 to the present day, it has hosted 13 Minor Counties matches., with Wales Minor Counties playing Devon in the first Minor Counties match on the ground in 1992.

The only List-A match played on the ground came in the 2000 NatWest Trophy between Wales Minor Counties and Buckinghamshire, with Wales Minor Counties winning by 11 runs.

In local domestic cricket, Pontarddulais Park is the home ground of Pontarddulais Cricket Club who play in the South Wales Cricket League.
