= Ian Darlington =

English cricketer

Personal information
- Full name: Ian John Darlington
- Born: 2 November 1977 (age 49); Derby, Derbyshire, England
- Batting: Right-handed
- Bowling: Right-arm medium

Domestic team information
- Years: Team
- 1999–2002: Derbyshire Cricket Board

Career statistics
Competition	List A
Matches	6
Runs scored	163
Batting average	32.60
100s/50s	0/1
Top score	58
Balls bowled	229
Wickets	4
Bowling average	50.50
5 wickets in innings	0
10 wickets in match	0
Best bowling	3/19
Catches/stumpings	0/–
- Source: Cricinfo, 14 October 2010

Ian John Darlington (born 2 November 1977) is an English cricketer. Darlington is a right-handed batsman who bowls right-arm medium pace. He was born at Derby, Derbyshire.

Darlington represented the Derbyshire Cricket Board in List A cricket. His debut List A match came against Wales Minor Counties in the 1999 NatWest Trophy. From 1999 to 2000, he represented the Board in 6 matches, the last of which came against the Middlesex Cricket Board in the 1st round of the 2003 Cheltenham & Gloucester Trophy which was held in 2002. In his 6 List A matches, he scored 163 runs at a batting average of 32.60, with a single half century high score of 58. With the ball he took 4 wickets at a bowling average of 50.50, with best figures of 3/19.

Darlington currently plays club cricket for Ockbrook and Borrowash Cricket Club in the Derbyshire Premier Cricket League.
