= Michael Dixon (umpire) =

English cricket umpire

Michael Dixon (born 21 September 1954) is a cricket umpire from Liverpool, Lancashire, England. Dixon first stood in a senior List A match between Ireland and the Essex Cricket Board in the 1999 NatWest Trophy. In total, Dixon stood in seven List A matches between 1999 and 2003. He first stood in a first-class match when Cambridge UCCE played Sussex County Cricket Club in 2001. Between 2001 and 2003, he stood in nine first-class matches. He has also stood as an umpire in Minor Counties cricket, and umpiring in the Liverpool and District Premier League.
