= Cliff Goldstraw =

Australian rules footballer, born 1916

Personal information
- Full name: Cliff Goldstraw
- Born: 24 February 1916
- Died: 17 March 1994 (aged 78)
- Original team: Terang
- Height: 177 cm (5 ft 10 in)
- Weight: 81 kg (179 lb)

Playing career^{1}
Years	Club	Games (Goals)
1937	St Kilda	1 (0)
- ^{1} Playing statistics correct to the end of 1937.

Cliff Goldstraw (24 February 1916 – 17 March 1994) was an Australian rules footballer who played with St Kilda in the Victorian Football League (VFL).
