= Timothy Bloomfield =

English cricketer

Timothy Bloomfield (born 31 May 1973) was an English cricketer. He was a right-handed batsman and a right-arm medium-fast bowler. He represented his home county of Middlesex in First Class cricket between 1997 and 2004, and in Twenty20 cricket from 2003 to 2004.

Bloomfield's first cricketing appearances came during the 1996 season in the Second XI championship for Sussex, though before too long he was to see himself off to Middlesex, for whom he made his debut first-class match in June 1997. Bloomfield was a tailend batsman for the entirety of his cricketing career, which finished after the 2004 Twenty20 Cup.
