= Laurie Potter =

English cricketer

Personal information
- Born: 7 November 1962 (age 64); Bexleyheath, Kent, England
- Batting: Right-handed
- Bowling: Left-arm orthodox, left-arm medium
- Role: All-rounder

Domestic team information
- Years: Team
- 1981–1985: Kent
- 1984/85–1985/86: Griqualand West
- 1986–1993: Leicestershire
- 1987/88: Orange Free State
- 1994: Cornwall
- 1995–2001: Staffordshire
- FC debut: 17 June 1981 Kent v Oxford University
- Last FC: 7 August 1993 Leicestershire v Middlesex
- LA debut: 21 June 1981 Kent v Somerset
- Last LA: 29 August 2001 Staffordshire v Hertfordshire

Career statistics
Competition	First-class	List A
Matches	207	223
Runs scored	9,027	4,218
Batting average	28.93	24.24
100s/50s	8/50	3/16
Top score	165*	112
Balls bowled	14,637	3,840
Wickets	177	81
Bowling average	38.86	32.39
5 wickets in innings	1	1
10 wickets in match	0	0
Best bowling	5/45	5/28
Catches/stumpings	190/–	81/–
- Source: Cricinfo, 28 June 2011

Laurie Potter (born 7 November 1962) is an English former cricketer. He captained England and Australia at under-19 level. He played first-class cricket in England and South Africa for Kent, Griqualand West, Leicestershire and Orange Free State.

== Early life ==
Potter was born in England but brought up in Australia. He played for West Perth (now known as Willetton), Willetton, Western Australia, in Western Australian grade cricket where he holds a club record for the largest second wicket partnership.

== Under-19 international ==
He is the only person to captain both the Australian and English cricket teams, these being at under 19 level. He toured Pakistan in 1981 as the Australian u/19 captain (scoring 108 not out in the 3rd Test) and then captained England u/19 against the West Indies in 1982.

== Post-first-class career ==
After finishing his first class career, Potter captained Cannock Cricket Club in the Birmingham League, where for a time he was captain to the teenage Kevin Pietersen.

He later had stints at Market Harborough and Hinckley.

== Statistics ==
He has played in 223 First class games scoring 9,027 runs at an average of 28.93. He scored 8 centuries and has passed fifty on 50 other occasions. His highest score was 165*. He also took 177 wickets at average of 38.86 with his best performance being 5/45. He has claimed 190 catches too.

He played 207 List A games scoring 4,218 runs at average of 24.24. He scored three centuries and passed fifty on 16 other occasions. His highest score is 112. He has taken 91 wickets at an average of 32.39. His best performance being 5/28.
