= James Hibberd (cricketer) =

English cricketer

Personal information
- Full name: James Hibberd
- Born: 19 April 1981 (age 45); Southampton, Hampshire, England
- Nickname: Hibby Hibbo
- Batting: Right-handed
- Bowling: Right-arm medium-fast

Domestic team information
- Years: Team
- 2002–2010: Wiltshire
- 2000–2001: Hampshire Cricket Board

Career statistics
Competition	List A
Matches	4
Runs scored	27
Batting average	9.00
100s/50s	0/0
Top score	26
Balls bowled	150
Wickets	7
Bowling average	11.42
5 wickets in innings	0
10 wickets in match	0
Best bowling	4/48
Catches/stumpings	1/–
- Source: Cricinfo, 29 December 2009

James Hibberd (born 19 April 1981) is an English former cricketer. He was a right-handed batsman and bowled medium-fast. He was born at Southampton in 1981.

Hibberd made his debut for the Hampshire Cricket Board in the 38-County Cup during the 2000 season, playing his first match against Dorset. He played three matches during the competition, top-scoring with 24 runs.

Hibberd made a single List-A appearance for the Hampshire Cricket Board against the Kent Cricket Board during the 2001 Cheltenham & Gloucester Trophy. He did not bat or bowl in the match which, having been extended to two days after a wash-out on the first day, had to be settled by a bowl-out.

Hibberd made three appearances in the same competition for Wiltshire, his debut for the team coming in August 2002, against Hampshire Cricket Board. His final List-A match came against Kent in the 2005 Cheltenham & Gloucester Trophy. Hibberd took 7–97 against Cardiff University in his last match for Hampshire 1st XI also scoring 33 with the bat.

In four List A matches, he scored 27 runs in three innings, including an innings high of 26 runs in his first innings. He bowled 25 overs in List-A cricket, taking 7 wickets and conceding 80 runs, including a best bowling performance of 4–48 in his debut match.
