= Marcus Sharp =

English former cricketer

Marcus Anthony Sharp (born 1 June 1970) is an English former cricketer. He was a left-handed batsman and a right-arm medium-pace bowler who played for Lancashire. He was born in Oxford.

Sharp made his debut Second XI Championship appearance while aged eighteen, against Glamorgan. He appeared steadily in the competition throughout the following five seasons, between 1988 and 1993. His only first-class match came for Lancashire against Oxford University. Sharp failed to get a chance to bat for the team, as they declared 140 runs behind in their first innings before forging to victory thanks to the peripatetic Trevor Jesty, who scored a century in the second innings.

Sharp played his first NatWest Trophy match for Cumberland in 1994, though it was for the Minor Counties team in the Benson and Hedges Cup in which he would play most often, making 18 appearances in the competition in total.

As of the 2011 season, Sharp represented Cumberland in the Minor Counties Championship, a competition in which he has played since 1994, aiding the team to two successive finals in 1999 and 2000, being successful in the former, against Dorset.
