= Daniel Goldstraw =

English cricketer (born 1969)

Personal information
- Full name: Daniel Benton Goldstraw
- Born: 17 June 1969 (age 57); Sheffield, Yorkshire, England
- Batting: Left-handed
- Bowling: Left-arm fast-medium

Domestic team information
- Years: Team
- 2003: Dorset
- 2001: Wiltshire
- 1998–2002: Hampshire Cricket Board

Career statistics
Competition	List A
Matches	1
Runs scored	0
Batting average	0.00
100s/50s	–/–
Top score	0
Balls bowled	60
Wickets	1
Bowling average	30.00
5 wickets in innings	–
10 wickets in match	–
Best bowling	1/30
Catches/stumpings	–/–
- Source: Cricinfo, 29 December 2009

Daniel Benton Goldstraw (born 17 June 1969 in Sheffield, Yorkshire) is a former English List A cricketer. Goldstraw was a left-handed batsman who bowled left-arm fast-medium.

Goldstraw made his debut for Wiltshire in the 2001 MCCA Knockout Trophy against Cornwall. He played Minor counties cricket for Wiltshire in 2001, making 3 MCCA Knockout Trophy matches and a single Minor Counties Championship match against Wales Minor Counties.

Having played MCCA Knockout Trophy cricket for the Hampshire Cricket Board since 1998, Goldstraw made a single List A appearance for the Hampshire Cricket Board in the 2nd Round of the 2003 Cheltenham & Gloucester Trophy, which was played in 2002 against Staffordshire. Goldstraw was dismissed for a second ball duck by Rob Bailey. With the ball he took the wicket of Rob Bailey for the cost of 33 runs from 10 overs.

He later appeared for Dorset in a single MCCA Knockout Trophy match against Suffolk in 2003. He previously represented the Hampshire Second XI in 1994 and 1995.
