= Eddie Stanford (cricketer) =

English cricketer

Personal information
- Full name: Edward John Stanford
- Born: 21 January 1971 (age 55); Dartford, Kent
- Batting: Left-handed
- Bowling: Slow left-arm orthodox

Domestic team information
- Years: Team
- 1995–1997: Kent
- 1999–2002: Kent Cricket Board

Career statistics
Competition	First-class	List A
Matches	5	7
Runs scored	48	26
Batting average	24.00	5.20
100s/50s	0/0	0/0
Top score	32	13
Balls bowled	902	288
Wickets	9	10
Bowling average	43.11	21.10
5 wickets in innings	0	0
10 wickets in match	0	0
Best bowling	3/84	3/29
Catches/stumpings	2/–	1/–
- Source: Cricinfo, 13 November 2010

Edward John Stanford (born 21 January 1971) is a former English cricketer. Stanford was a left-handed batsman who bowled slow left-arm orthodox. He was born at Dartford, Kent.

Stanford made his first-class debut for Kent against Cambridge University in 1995. From 1995 to 1997, he represented the county in five first-class matches, the last of which came against Cambridge University.

Stanford later made his debut in List A cricket for the Kent Cricket Board against Denmark in the 1999 NatWest Trophy. From 1999 to 2001, he represented the Board in 7 List A matches, the last of which came against Buckinghamshire in the 2001 Cheltenham & Gloucester Trophy.
