= Adrian Marsh =

English cricketer (born 1978)

Personal information
- Full name: Adrian John Marsh
- Born: 4 November 1978 (age 48); Nottingham, England
- Batting: Left-handed
- Bowling: Right-arm medium

Domestic team information
- Years: Team
- 1999–2001: Derbyshire Cricket Board
- List A debut: 19 May 1999 Derbyshire CB v Wales Minor Counties
- Last List A: 29 August 2001 Derbyshire CB v Bedfordshire

Career statistics
Competition	List A
Matches	4
Runs scored	73
Batting average	18.25
100s/50s	0/1
Top score	53
Catches/stumpings	2/–
- Source: CricketArchive, 10 December 2008

Adrian Marsh (born 4 November 1978) is a former English cricketer. He was a left-handed batsman and a right-arm medium-pace bowler.

Marsh played for Somerset's second XI, debuting with a duck in August 1996. He represented the Derbyshire Cricket Board in the List A NatWest Trophy in three consecutive seasons.
