= Mark Mason (cricketer) =

English cricketer

Personal information
- Full name: Mark Jonathon George Mason
- Born: 12 September 1975 (age 51); Leicester, Leicestershire, England
- Batting: Right-handed
- Bowling: Right-arm fast-medium

Domestic team information
- Years: Team
- 2000–2003: Cambridgeshire

Career statistics
Competition	List A
Matches	5
Runs scored	0
Batting average	0.00
100s/50s	–/–
Top score	0*
Balls bowled	259
Wickets	6
Bowling average	25.66
5 wickets in innings	–
10 wickets in match	–
Best bowling	2/34
Catches/stumpings	1/–
- Source: Cricinfo, 21 July 2010

Mark Jonathon George Mason (born 12 September 1975) is a former English cricketer. Mason was a right-handed batsman who bowls right-arm fast-medium. He was born at Leicester, Leicestershire.

Mason made his debut for Cambridgeshire in a List A match, which came against Hertfordshire. From 2000 to 2003, he represented the county in 5 List-A matches, with his final List-A match coming against Yorkshire. In his 5 matches, he took 6 wickets at a bowling average of 25.66, with best figures of 2/34.

Mason also represented Cambridgeshire in the Minor Counties Championship, where he made his debut for the county in that competition against Suffolk. From 2000 to 2003, he represented the county in 16 Minor Counties matches, with his final appearance for the county coming against Buckinghamshire.
