= John Bowden (cricketer) =

English cricketer

Personal information
- Full name: John Daniel Peter Bowden
- Born: 25 July 1973 (age 53); Sidcup, Kent, England
- Batting: Left-handed
- Bowling: Left-arm medium

Domestic team information
- Years: Team
- 1999–2003: Kent Cricket Board

Career statistics
Competition	LA
Matches	12
Runs scored	342
Batting average	31.09
100s/50s	–/2
Top score	91
Balls bowled	–
Wickets	–
Bowling average	–
5 wickets in innings	–
10 wickets in match	–
Best bowling	–
Catches/stumpings	4/–
- Source: Cricinfo, 13 November 2010

John Daniel Peter Bowden (born 25 July 1973) is an English cricketer. Bowden is a left-handed batsman who bowls left-arm medium pace. He was born at Sidcup, Kent.

Bowden represented the Kent Cricket Board in List A cricket. His debut List A match came against Denmark in the 1999 NatWest Trophy. From 1999 to 2003, he represented the Board in 12 List A matches, the last of which came against Derbyshire in the 2003 Cheltenham & Gloucester Trophy. In his 12 List A matches, he scored 342 runs at a batting average of 31.09, with a 2 half centuries and a high score of 91. In the field he took 4 catches.

He currently plays for Sevenoaks Vine Cricket Club in the Kent Cricket League.
