= Jack Doidge =

Canadian Anglican priest (1915–2016)

John Nicholls (Jack) Doidge (1915–2016) was an Anglican priest in Canada in the 20th and 21st centuries.

Doidge was educated at the University of Western Ontario. He was ordained deacon in 1938; and priest in 1939 After a curacy at St. Catharines he served as a military chaplain during World war Two. When peace returned he was Rector of Tillsonburg. He held further incumbencies in London, Chatham and Winnipeg. He became Rector of St Matthias Winnipeg in 1962 and Archdeacon of Montreal in 1970. Although he partially retired in 1983 he continued to minister part time until he was 95.
