= Steven Chapman (cricketer) =

English cricketer (born 1971)

Steven Chapman (born 2 October 1971) was an English cricketer. He was a right-handed batsman and a slow-left arm bowler who played for Durham. He was born in Crook, beginning his cricket career as a junior with his hometown club, Crook Town CC.

Chapman appeared in his debut first-class match during the 1998 season, in which he bowled conservatively in spite of his team's poor form, which saw them lose the match by an innings margin. Chapman made two further first-class appearances the following season, though he was released at the end of 1999 after making his final Second XI appearance against Worcestershire Second XI, in which team-mate Quentin Hughes scored a double-century and Chapman himself took match bowling figures of 12 for 48, a County Second XI record.

Having made his first appearance for Northumberland back in 1997, Chapman rejoined the team in 2001 following the end of his first-class career, and played in the Minor Counties Championship and Minor Counties Trophy until 2003. From 2000–2009 he appeared as a club professional at a number of clubs in the North East of England and spending each winter coaching and playing in Melbourne in Australia. Since 2010 he has played back at his hometown club Crook Town.
