= Wayne Falla =

English cricketer

Personal information
- Full name: Wayne Falla
- Born: 18 December 1970 (age 55); North Shields, Northumberland, England
- Batting: Right-handed
- Bowling: Right-arm medium

Domestic team information
- Years: Team
- 1990–2000: Northumberland

Career statistics
Competition	List A
Matches	5
Runs scored	184
Batting average	36.80
100s/50s	–/2
Top score	80
Balls bowled	3
Wickets	–
Bowling average	–
5 wickets in innings	–
10 wickets in match	–
Best bowling	–
Catches/stumpings	–/–
- Source: Cricinfo, 30 June 2011

Wayne Falla (born 18 December 1970) is a former English cricketer. Falla was a right-handed batsman who bowled right-arm medium pace. He was born in North Shields, Northumberland.

Falla made his debut for Northumberland in the 1990 MCCA Knockout Trophy against Cumberland. Falla played Minor counties cricket for Northumberland from 1990 to 2000, which included 31 Minor Counties Championship matches and 17 MCCA Knockout Trophy matches. He made his List A debut against Yorkshire in the 1992 NatWest Trophy. He made 4 further List A matches for the county, the last coming against Leicestershire in the 2000 NatWest Trophy. In his 5 List A matches, he scored 184 runs at a batting average of 36.80. He made two half centuries, with a high score of 80 against Ireland in the 1999 NatWest Trophy.
