= Stephen Dearden =

English cricketer

Personal information
- Full name: Stephen Edward Dearden
- Born: 1 February 1968 (age 58); Walshaw, Bury, Greater Manchester, England
- Batting: Right-handed
- Bowling: Right-arm medium

Domestic team information
- Years: Team
- 1999–2002: Lancashire Cricket Board

Career statistics
Competition	LA
Matches	7
Runs scored	211
Batting average	35.16
100s/50s	–/1
Top score	67*
Balls bowled	312
Wickets	10
Bowling average	22.00
5 wickets in innings	–
10 wickets in match	–
Best bowling	4/31
Catches/stumpings	2/–
- Source: Cricinfo, 14 November 2010

Stephen Edward Dearden (born 1 February 1968) is an English cricketer. Dearden is a right-handed batsman who bowls right-arm medium pace. He was born at Walshaw, Bury, Greater Manchester.

Dearden represented the Lancashire Cricket Board in List A cricket. His debut List A match came against the Netherlands in the 1999 NatWest Trophy. From 1999 to 2002, he represented the Board in 7 List A matches, the last of which came against Scotland in the 2nd round of the 2003 Cheltenham & Gloucester Trophy which was played in 2002. In his 7 List A matches, he scored 211 runs at a batting average of 35.16, with a single half century high score of 67*. In the field he took 2 catches. With the ball, he took 10 wickets at a bowling average of 22.00, with best figures of 4/31.

He currently plays for Haslingden Cricket Club in the Lancashire League.
