= Dwain Winter =

English cricketer (born 1964)

Dwain Alan Winter
Personal information
- Full name: Dwain Alan Winter
- Born: 28 March 1964 (age 62); Devizes, Wiltshire, England
- Height: 6 ft 0 in (1.83 m)
- Batting: Left-handed
- Bowling: Right-arm medium
- Role: Occasional wicketkeeper

Domestic team information
- Years: Team
- 1994-2001: Wiltshire

Career statistics
Competition	LA
Matches	5
Runs scored	73
Batting average	18.25
100s/50s	–/–
Top score	37*
Balls bowled	–
Wickets	–
Bowling average	–
5 wickets in innings	–
10 wickets in match	–
Best bowling	–
Catches/stumpings	–/–
- Source: Cricinfo, 10 October 2010

Dwain Alan Winter (born 28 March 1964) is a former English cricketer. Winter was a left-handed batsman who bowled right-arm medium pace and who occasionally played as a wicketkeeper. He was born at Devizes, Wiltshire.

Winter made his Minor Counties Championship debut for Wiltshire in 1994 against Berkshire. From 1994 to 2001, he represented the county in 45 Minor Counties Championship matches, the last of which came against Shropshire. Winter also represented Wiltshire in the MCCA Knockout Trophy, making his debut in that competition came against Herefordshire in 1996. From 1996 to 2001, he represented the county in 19 Trophy matches, the last of which came against the Gloucestershire Cricket Board.

Winter also represented Wiltshire in List A matches. His debut List A match came against the Northamptonshire Cricket Board in the 1999 NatWest Trophy. From 1999 to 2001, he represented the county in 5 List A matches, the last of which came against the Derbyshire Cricket Board in the 2001 Cheltenham & Gloucester Trophy. In his 5 List A matches, he scored 73 runs at a batting average of 18.25, with a high score of 37*.
