= Jeremy Page =

English cricketer

Jeremy Page (born 6 September 1959) was an English cricketer. He was a left-handed batsman who played for Bedfordshire. He was born in Luton, Bedfordshire.

Page, who represented Bedfordshire in the Minor Counties Championship between 1995 and 2003, made a single List A appearance for the team, in the 2000 NatWest Trophy, against Northumberland. From the opening order, he scored 61 runs, the highest score of any Bedfordshire player in the match.
