= Vyvian Pike =

English cricketer

Personal information
- Full name: Vyvian John Pike
- Born: 13 August 1969 (age 57); Taunton, Somerset, England
- Batting: Right-handed
- Bowling: Leg break

Domestic team information
- Years: Team
- 1997–2001: Dorset
- 1994–1995: Gloucestershire
- 1993: Dorset

Career statistics
Competition	FC	LA
Matches	14	5
Runs scored	156	71
Batting average	12.00	17.75
100s/50s	–/–	–/–
Top score	27	45
Balls bowled	2,367	312
Wickets	31	9
Bowling average	37.74	20.55
5 wickets in innings	1	1
10 wickets in match	–	–
Best bowling	6/41	5/10
Catches/stumpings	5/–	2/–
- Source: Cricinfo, 22 March 2010

Vyvian John Pike (born 13 August 1969) is a former English cricketer. Pike was a right-handed batsman who bowled leg break.

Pike made his debut for Dorset in the 1993 Minor Counties Championship against Cornwall. In Pike's first spell with the club, he represented Dorset in 5 Minor Counties Championship matches.

In 1994, Pike made his first-class debut for Gloucestershire against Cambridge University. From 1994 to 1995, he played 14 first-class matches for the county, with his final first-class match coming against Glamorgan.

In his 14 first-class matches for the county he scored 156 runs at a batting average of 12.00, with a high score of 27. With the ball he took 31 wickets at a bowling average of 37.74, with a single five wicket haul of 6/41 on debut against Cambridge University.

In 1997, Pike returned to Dorset where he represented the club in 41 Minor County Championship matches from 1997 to 2001, with his final Minor Counties match for the county coming against Berkshire.

Pike made his List-A debut Dorset team against Hampshire in the 1998 NatWest Trophy. Pike represented the Dorset in 5 List-A matches from 1998 to 2001, with his final List-A match for the county coming against Bedfordshire in the 2nd round of the 2001 Cheltenham & Gloucester Trophy.

In his 5 List-A matches for Dorset, Pike scored 71 runs at an average of 17.75, with a high score of 45. With the ball he took 9 wickets at a bowling average of 20.55, with a single five wicket haul of 5/20 against Norfolk in the 2000 NatWest Trophy.
