= Robin Jones (cricketer) =

English cricketer

Personal information
- Full name: Robin Owen Jones
- Born: 4 October 1973 (age 53); Crewe, Cheshire, England
- Batting: Right-handed
- Bowling: Right-arm off break
- Relatives: Garri Jones (brother)

Domestic team information
- Years: Team
- 1999–2000: Middlesex Cricket Board
- 1996–1997: Cambridge University

Career statistics
Competition	FC	LA
Matches	16	3
Runs scored	530	10
Batting average	25.23	3.33
100s/50s	–/4	–/–
Top score	61	5
Balls bowled	2,006	36
Wickets	18	4
Bowling average	68.88	9.50
5 wickets in innings	–	–
10 wickets in match	–	–
Best bowling	3/116	3/24
Catches/stumpings	8/–	–/–
- Source: Cricinfo, 19 November 2010

Robin Owen Jones (born 4 October 1973) is a former English cricketer. Jones was a right-handed batsman who bowled right-arm off break. He was born at Crewe, Cheshire.

== Personal ==
Jones attended Millfield School. He studied at Durham University before moving on to Cambridge.

== Career ==
Jones made his first-class debut for Cambridge University against Glamorgan in 1996. From 1996 to 1997, he represented the University in 16 first-class matches, the last of which came against Oxford University. In his 16 first-class matches for the University, he scored 530 runs at a batting average of 25.23, with 4 half centuries and a high score of 61. In the field he took 8 catches. With the ball he took 18 wickets at an expensive bowling average of 68.88, with best figures of 3/116.

In 1999, he made his List A debut for the Middlesex Cricket Board against Cumberland in the 1999 NatWest Trophy. He played 2 further List A matches for the Board in the 2000 NatWest Trophy against Wiltshire and Sussex. In his 2 List A matches, he scored 10 runs at an average of 3.33, with a high score of 5. With the ball he took 4 wickets at an average of 9.50, with best figures of 3/54.

== Family ==
His brother, Garri, also played first-class cricket for Cambridge University.
