= Jason Searle =

English cricketer

Jason Searle (born 16 May 1976) is a former English cricketer. He was a right-handed batsman and a right-arm off-break bowler who played for Durham and Wiltshire.

Searle made his first-class debut for Durham during the 1994 season, having had a solid Second XI season the previous year. His debut appearance saw a ten-wicket loss at the hands of Lancashire, though Searle finished not-out in both innings, a fate which probably would not have befallen him but for John Wood's second half-century of his career.

Searle made his second-last County Championship appearance the following year, while Durham suffered a disappointing 1995 season in general, finishing second-bottom only to Kent. He was then not to appear in another first-class match for three years, instead becoming a regular in the Second XI. While he made two final first-class appearances during the 1998 season, he continued to play in the Second XI Championship and the Second XI Trophy until 1998.

Upon the completion of his Second XI career, Searle moved to Wiltshire, for whom he played for four seasons in the Minor Counties Championship before hanging up his gloves in 2004. Searle appeared in three Youth Test matches, his first coming in an England Under-19 tour of the West Indies, followed by two appearances against South Africa during the 1995 English summer.
