= The Quarters, Hursley Park =

Cricket ground in Hampshire, England

The Quarters
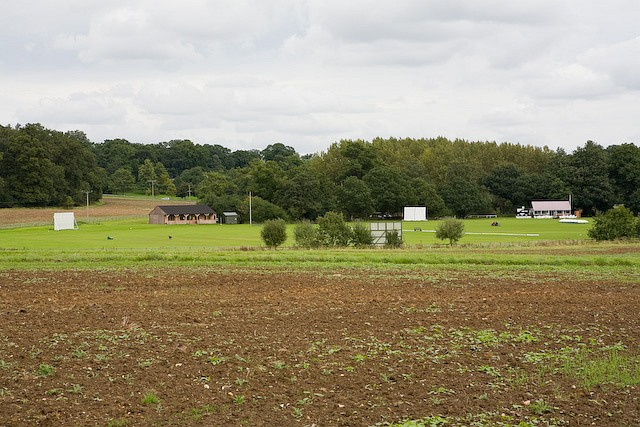

Ground information
- Location: Hursley, Hampshire
- Coordinates: 51.0203°N 1.4023°W
- Establishment: circa 1930

Team information
Hampshire Cricket Board	(2001–2002)
- As of 9 January 2009; Source: Ground profile

The Quarters is a cricket ground located off Hursley Park Road in the grounds of the former Hursley Park Estate at Hursley, Hampshire, England. Set in rural surroundings, the ground is surrounded by open countryside on all sides, with the north and east sides also being bordered by trees and a small woodland. The southern end is bordered by a small stream. The north east corner houses the older pavilion, while the north west corner houses a new pavilion. The ground includes two fields and in turn two bowling squares.

== History ==
The first recorded match on the ground was played in 1983 between Hursley Park and Andover, though Hursley Park have been playing there for over 70 years. Hursley Park continued to use the ground throughout the remainder of the 1980s and into the 1990s, with the Hampshire Cricket Board (HCB) first using the ground in 2001, playing an MCCA Knockout Trophy match against the Sussex Cricket Board. The following year the ground played host to two List A matches, both involving the HCB. The first saw Wiltshire as the visitors in the 1st round of the 2003 Cheltenham & Gloucester Trophy, which the HCB won by 84 runs. In the following round Staffordshire were the visitors, with them defeating the HCB by 105 runs. Both matches were played late in the 2002 season to avoid fixture congestion in 2003.

Hursley Park Cricket Club still play their home matches at The Quarters.

== Records ==
=== List A ===
- Highest team total: 280/6 (50 overs) by Hampshire Cricket Board v Wiltshire, 2002
- Lowest team total: 144 all out (36.4 overs) by Hampshire Cricket Board v Staffordshire, 2002
- Highest individual innings: 101 by Damian Shirazi for Hampshire Cricket Board v Wiltshire, 2002
- Best bowling in an innings: 4/21 by Michael Rindel for Staffordshire v Hampshire Cricket Board, 2002
