= Simon Kellett =

English cricketer (born 1967)

Simon Andrew Kellett (16 October 1967 in Mirfield, Yorkshire, England) is an English first-class cricketer, who played for Yorkshire County Cricket Club between 1989 and 1995.

A right-handed opening batsman, he made his county debut in 1989. He played for Wellington in New Zealand during the 1991/92 season, and appeared for Yorkshire until 1995. He has played Minor Counties cricket for Cambridgeshire since 1996, and currently captains the team who won their first game in two years in July 2010.

In 87 first-class matches he scored 4,234 runs, with two centuries and a top score of 125 not out, for an average of 30.46. In 67 one day matches, he scored 1,494 runs at an average of 25.32, with a top score of 118 not out. His occasional right arm medium pace bowling failed to take a wicket.
