= Matthew Doidge =

English cricketer

Matthew James Doidge (born 2 July 1970 in Horsforth, Leeds, Yorkshire, England) is an English first-class cricketer, who played once for Yorkshire County Cricket Club in 1990.

His only first-class appearance came against the Indian tourists in 1990 at Headingley. Doidge bowled 24 overs of left arm orthodox spin, conceding 106 runs, but failed to take a wicket. A left-handed batsman, he did not get to bat in the drawn game in which Sanjay Manjrekar scored 158 not out.

He reappeared for the Yorkshire Cricket Board to play six one day matches between 1999 and 2001. He scored 98 runs in total, with his highest score being an unbeaten 54 against Huntingdonshire. He did not bowl in these games.

He also appeared for the Yorkshire Cricket Association Under-19s (1987), National Association of Young Cricketers (1989), National Association of Young Cricketers North (1987–1989) and Yorkshire Second XI (1988–1991). More latterly, Doidge played for Pudsey Congs Cricket Club.
