= Michael Strong (cricketer) =

English cricketer

Personal information
- Full name: Michael Richard Strong
- Born: 28 June 1974 (age 52); Cuckfield, Sussex, England
- Batting: Left-handed
- Bowling: Right-arm medium-fast
- Role: Bowler

Domestic team information
- Years: Team
- 1996–1999: Sussex
- 2000–2001: Northamptonshire

Career statistics
Competition	First-class	List A
Matches	15	19
Runs scored	235	63
Batting average	15.66	7.00
100s/50s	0/0	0/0
Top score	35*	21
Balls bowled	2,297	860
Wickets	31	31
Bowling average	46.00	25.58
5 wickets in innings	0	1
10 wickets in match	0	0
Best bowling	4/46	5/39
Catches/stumpings	4/–	4/–
- Source: CricInfo, 21 June 2010

Michael Richard Strong (born 28 June 1974) was an English cricketer who played for Sussex and later on Northamptonshire. He was born in Cuckfield, Sussex.

== Career ==
Strong only made two first-class appearances for Sussex. He then made the move to Northamptonshire in 2000 taking 31 wickets in his 13 first-class games spanning over two years. During a one-day game against Gloucestershire, he conceded a record 99 runs from his nine overs (a new record for the most expensive analysis in the one-day league surpassing Dominic Cork's 96 conceded against Nottinghamshire in a 50 over game in 1993, though he bowled only eight overs).
