= Ross Hunter (cricketer) =

English cricketer (born 1981)

Personal information
- Full name: Ross Leslie Alan Hunter
- Born: 27 January 1981 (age 45); Frimley, Surrey, England
- Batting: Right-handed
- Role: Wicketkeeper

Domestic team information
- Years: Team
- 2000: Hampshire Cricket Board

Career statistics
Competition	List A
Matches	1
Runs scored	33
Batting average	33.00
100s/50s	0/0
Top score	33
Catches/stumpings	0/1
- Source: Cricinfo, 28 December 2009

Ross Leslie Alan Hunter (born 27 January 1981) is a former English cricketer. Hunter was a right-handed batsman who played primarily as a wicketkeeper and represented England at Under 15 and 17 level. He was born at Frimley in Surrey in 1981.

Hunter played a single List-A match for the Hampshire Cricket Board in the 2000 NatWest Trophy against Huntingdonshire. Hunter scored 33 runs and completed one stumping.

Hunter played three Second Eleven Championship matches in 2001 for the Derbyshire Second XI and Second Eleven Friendly matches for Hampshire County Cricket Club prior to that.

Hunter became a professional cricket coach and Head Coach of the England Visually Impaired Cricket Team. He is the 21st coach of an England Cricket Team. He is now using this experience of coaching and elite environments in businesses and organisations.
