= Stephen Livermore =

English cricketer

Personal information
- Full name: Stephen John Berry Livermore
- Born: 8 September 1970 (age 56); Chippenham, Wiltshire, England
- Batting: Left-handed
- Bowling: Right-arm off break

Domestic team information
- Years: Team
- 1991–2002: Norfolk

Career statistics
Competition	List A
Matches	7
Runs scored	83
Batting average	16.60
100s/50s	0/0
Top score	23*
Catches/stumpings	0/–
- Source: Cricinfo, 29 June 2011

Stephen John Berry Livermore (born 8 September 1970) is an English cricketer. Livermore is a left-handed batsman who bowled right-arm off break. He was born in Chippenham, Wiltshire.

Livermore made his debut for Norfolk in the 1991 Minor Counties Championship against Northumberland. Livermore played Minor counties cricket for Norfolk from 1991 to 2002, which included 10 Minor Counties Championship matches and 20 MCCA Knockout Trophy matches. He made his List A debut against Leicestershire in the 1992 NatWest Trophy. He made 6 further List A appearances, the last coming against Berkshire in the 2nd round of the 2003 Cheltenham & Gloucester Trophy, which was played in 2002. In his 7 List A matches, he scored 83 runs at an average of 16.60, with a high score of 23 not out.
