= Christopher Yates =

English cricketer (born 1981)

Personal information
- Full name: Christopher Joseph Yates
- Born: 10 August 1981 (age 45); Aldershot, Hampshire, England
- Nickname: Donkey
- Batting: Left-handed
- Bowling: Right-arm fast-medium

Domestic team information
- Years: Team
- 2000–2001: Hampshire Cricket Board

Career statistics
Competition	List A
Matches	2
Runs scored	23
Batting average	11.50
100s/50s	–/–
Top score	22
Balls bowled	90
Wickets	4
Bowling average	9.75
5 wickets in innings	–
10 wickets in match	–
Best bowling	3/17
Catches/stumpings	–/–
- Source: Cricinfo, 28 December 2009

Christopher Joseph Yates (born 10 August 1981 in Aldershot, Hampshire) is a former English cricketer. Yates was a left-handed batsman who bowled right-arm medium-fast.

Yates made his List-A debut for the Hampshire Cricket Board in the 2000 NatWest Trophy against Huntingdonshire, where he took 3/17 seven overs. Yates played in the 2nd Round of the 2002 Cheltenham and Gloucester Trophy, which was played in 2001 against Ireland where Yates took his final List-A wicket, that of Peter Davy.
