= Hampshire Cricket Board =

Governing body for cricket in Hampshire, England

- Sport: Cricket
- Abbreviation: HCB
- Founded: 1996
- Location: Rose Bowl, Southampton
- Chairman: Jeff Levick
- Secretary: Colin Savage

Official website
- www.rosebowlplc.com/pages/community/

The Hampshire Cricket Board (HCB) was formed in 1996 and is the governing body for all recreational cricket in the historic county of Hampshire. Following a restructuring in January 2010, the HCB now operates as a limited company.

== History and role ==
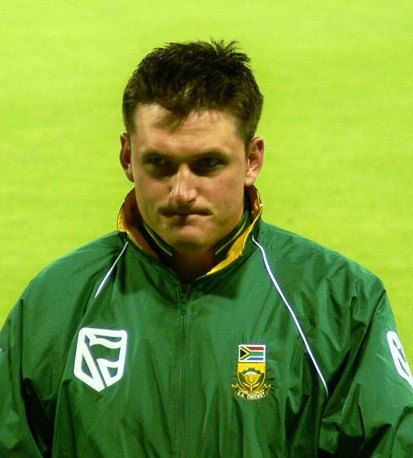
Graeme Smith played a List A match for the HCB in 2000 against Huntingdonshire, he would later play for and captain South Africa

The Board's aim is to nurture the game of cricket at a recreational level, increase the levels of participation in cricket, identify and nurture future county players, and provide players with the opportunities to advance to the highest level of the game.

Three years after the HCB was formed, the England and Wales Cricket Board (ECB) reformed the NatWest Trophy by allowing all twenty Minor counties and the cricket boards of all first-class English counties. These matches held List A status, with the HCB defeating Suffolk in its first match in the 1999 NatWest Trophy. The HCB played eight List A matches before the ECB reduced the competitions size, which resulted in the cricket boards being excluded from future competitions. It won three of its eight matches. The HCB employed the services of future international players Graeme Smith and Chris Tremlett, and played its home matches at the County Ground, Southampton, Grasmere Road, Cove, the Rose Bowl, and The Quarters, Hursley Park. The Board was also permitted to take part in the Minor counties one-day competition between 1998 and 2002.

As part of its role to develop the game in Hampshire the HCB offers a number of ECB accredited courses involving coaching, physical training, umpiring and scoring. Qualified coaches are then able to join the HCB Coaches Association and ECB Coaches Association, with both associations helping coaching communication and individual practical development. The HCB Association is run by a management committee which consists of officials from local cricket clubs which are affiliated with the HCB.

== Structure ==
Prior to 2010 the HCB was run using an executive committee which had a number of sub committees linked to it, which included the Senior Cricket Committee, Finance Committee, Facilities Committee and Officiating (Umpires and Scorers) Committee. At the HCB Annual General Meeting in January 2010, it was decided that it would become a limited company, in doing so becoming the Hampshire Cricket Board Ltd.. This required the structure of the HCB to be changed to accommodate this change. The executive committee was replaced with a board of directors. This currently comprises:

| Name | Role |
|---|---|
| Jeff Levick MBE | (chairman) |
| Colin Savage | (Company Secretary) |
| Mark Readman | (Chairman – Finance Committee) |
| Zac Toumazi | (Hampshire Cricket Commercial Director) |
| Ben Thompson | (Cricket Development Manager) |

The board of directors oversees the four-year development strategy which covers the period from 2007 to 2011, as well as delivering an improvement action plan each year which has agreed aims with the England and Wales Cricket Board. Successful implementation of the improvement action plan and reaching quantitative targets, secures funding from the ECB. In its new form the sub committees have been restructured. These are the Senior Cricket Committee, Finance Committee, Facilities Committee, HCB Coaches Association and Hampshire Association of Cricket Officials.

== List A players ==
See List of Hampshire Cricket Board List A players and Category:Hampshire Cricket Board cricketers

== List A playing record ==
Hampshire Cricket Board List A record by opponent
| Opponent | M | W | L | T | NR | A | Win% | First | Last |
|---|---|---|---|---|---|---|---|---|---|
| Glamorgan | 1 | 0 | 1 | 0 | 0 | 0 | 0.00 | 1999 | 1999 |
| Huntingdonshire | 1 | 0 | 1 | 0 | 0 | 0 | 0.00 | 2000 | 2000 |
| Ireland | 1 | 0 | 1 | 0 | 0 | 0 | 0.00 | 2001 | 2001 |
| Kent Cricket Board | 1 | 0 | 0 | 0 | 1 | 0 | 100.00 | 2001 | 2001 |
| Shropshire | 1 | 1 | 0 | 0 | 0 | 0 | 100.00 | 1999 | 1999 |
| Staffordshire | 1 | 0 | 1 | 0 | 0 | 0 | 0.00 | 2002 | 2002 |
| Suffolk | 1 | 1 | 0 | 0 | 0 | 0 | 100.00 | 1999 | 1999 |
| Wiltshire | 1 | 1 | 0 | 0 | 0 | 0 | 100.00 | 2002 | 2002 |
| All List A | 8 | 3 | 4 | 0 | 1 | 0 | 37.50 | 1999 | 2002 |

== Grounds ==
Below is a complete list of grounds used by the Hampshire Cricket Board representative side when it was permitted to play List A and MCCA Knockout Trophy matches.

| Name | Location | First | Last | Matches | First | Last | Matches | Refs |
| Name | Location | List A | | | MCCA Trophy | | | Refs |
|---|---|---|---|---|---|---|---|---|
| Ripsley Park | Liphook | – | – | 0 | 24 May 1998 v Kent Cricket Board | 9 July 2000 v Berkshire | 2 | |
| Burridge Sports Ground | Burridge | – | – | 0 | 7 June 1998 v Buckinghamshire | 18 June 2000 v Dorset | 3 | |
| Grasmere Road | Cove | only match: 2 May 2000 v Huntingdonshire | | 1 | only match: 13 June 1999 v Sussex Cricket Board | | 1 | |
| County Ground | Southampton | only match: 23 June 1999 v Glamorgan | | 1 | only match: 20 June 1999 v Berkshire | | 1 | |
| The Quarters, Hursley Park | Hursley | 29 August 2002 v Wiltshire | 12 September 2002 v Staffordshire | 2 | only match: 20 May 2001 v Sussex Cricket Board | | 1 | |
| Rose Bowl (Nursery Ground) | West End | – | – | 0 | 17 June 2001 v Dorset | 19 May 2002 v Channel Islands | 2 | |
| Rose Bowl | West End | only match: 13 September 2001 v Ireland | | 1 | – | – | 0 | |
| Havant Park | Havant | – | – | 0 | only match: 16 June 2002 v Surrey Cricket Board | | 1 | |
