= List of Gloucestershire Cricket Board List A players =

A cricket team representing the Gloucestershire Cricket Board played seven List A cricket matches between 1999 and 2002. This is a list of the players who appeared in those matches.

- Stuart Barnes, 5 matches, 2000–2001
- Alastair Bressington, 3 matches, 1999–2000
- Nathan Bressington, 2 matches, 2000
- Christopher Budd, 5 matches, 1999–2001
- Stephen Caple, 1 match, 2002
- Danny Chard, 1 match, 2001
- Mark Coombes, 2 matches, 1999–2002
- Tom Cotterell, 1 match, 2000
- Simon Cowley, 1 match, 2000
- Andrew Edwards, 3 matches, 1999–2000
- Damian Forder, 3 matches, 1999–2001
- Alex Gidman, 3 matches, 2001
- Will Gidman, 1 match, 2002
- Mark Guest, 1 match, 2002
- Simon Hinks, 1 match, 1999
- Richard Howell, 3 matches, 2000–2001
- Robert Jennings, 1 match, 2001
- Paul Lazenbury, 1 match, 1999
- Imraan Mohammad, 2 matches, 2000
- James Pearson, 2 matches, 2001
- Stephen Pope, 5 matches, 1999–2001
- Stuart Priscott, 1 match, 2001
- James Rendell, 4 matches, 1999–2002
- William Rudge, 2 matches, 2001–2002
- Ben Staunton, 4 matches, 2001–2002
- Neil Stovold, 3 matches, 2001–2002
- Nicholas Stovold, 5 matches, 2000–2001
- Michael Sutliff, 1 match, 2001
- Chris Taylor, 1 match, 1999
- Jackson Thompson, 1 match, 2002
- Jonathan White, 7 matches, 1999–2002
- Graham Williams, 1 match, 2002
