= List of Huntingdonshire County Cricket Club List A players =

Huntingdonshire County Cricket Club, in its current form, was formed in 1948, and has never competed in the Minor Counties Championship. They have appeared in seven List A matches, making three NatWest Trophy and four Cheltenham & Gloucester Trophy appearances. The players in this list have all played at least one List A match. Huntingdonshire cricketers who have not represented the county in List A cricket are excluded from the list.

Players are listed in order of appearance, where players made their debut in the same match, they are ordered by batting order. Players in bold have played first-class cricket.

== Key ==
**General**

- ♠ – Captain
- † – Wicket-keeper
- **First** – Year of debut for Huntingdonshire
- **Last** – Year of latest match played for Huntingdonshire
- **Mat** – Number of matches played for Huntingdonshire
- **Win%** – Winning percentage

**Batting**

- **Inn** – Number of innings batted
- **NO** – Number of innings not out
- **Runs** – Runs scored in career
- **HS** – Highest score
- **100** – Centuries scored
- **50** – Half-centuries scored
- **Avg** – Runs scored per dismissal
- * – Batsman remained not out

**Bowling**

- **Balls** – Balls bowled in career
- **Wkt** – Wickets taken in career
- **BBI** – Best bowling in an innings
- **BBM** – Best bowling in a match
- **Ave** – Average runs per wicket

**Fielding**

- **Ca** – Catches taken
- **St** – Stumpings effected

== List of players ==
No.	Name	Nationality	First	Last	Mat	Batting			Bowling				Fielding	
No.	Name	Nationality	First	Last	Mat	Runs	HS	Avg	Balls	Wkt	BBI	Ave	Ca	St
1	**Roger Hudson**	England	1999	1999	1	12	12	12.00	0	0	–	–	1	0
2	Vincent Winn	England	1999	2000	3	97	50	32.33	0	0	–	–	0	0
3	**Steven Pope**	South Africa	1999	1999	1	69	69	69.00	36	0	–	–	0	0
4	Martin Burton	England	1999	2002	7	134	34	19.14	360	7	2/22	29.71	1	0
5	Jonathan Potter	England	1999	1999	1	30	30*	–	0	0	–	–	0	0
6	Adrian Cade ♠	England	1999	1999	1	5	5	5.00	0	0	–	–	0	0
7	Paul Swannell	England	1999	2002	2	17	12	8.50	90	1	1/28	66.00	0	0
8	Lee Ingram	England	1999	2000	3	18	13	9.00	156	3	1/26	33.00	1	0
9	Mark Turner	England	1999	2000	2	5	5	5.00	84	1	1/20	45.00	0	0
10	Gary Whitbread †	England	1999	1999	1	3	3*	–	0	0	–	–	1	0
11	Neil Rowlands ♠	England	1999	2001	6	10	6*	–	300	7	2/32	26.28	3	0
12	Paul Berrill	England	2000	2000	2	10	10	5.00	0	0	–	–	0	0
13	Nick Pishos	Australia	2000	2000	2	38	38	19.00	84	3	2/17	18.33	2	0
14	Kevin Sedgbeer	England	2000	2000	2	29	25	14.50	18	0	–	–	3	0
15	James Woodward	England	2000	2001	4	40	30	10.00	0	0	–	–	0	0
16	Chris Malton †	England	2000	2001	5	128	37	32.00	0	0	–	–	1	0
17	Billy Young	England	2000	2000	2	16	15	16.00	102	3	3/22	20.66	1	0
18	Tog Humphreys	England	2000	2000	1	0	0	0.00	0	0	–	–	0	0
19	**Carl Bradfield**	South Africa	2001	2001	3	32	21	10.66	66	4	2/17	21.00	3	0
20	**Wayne Larkins**	England	2001	2001	3	142	73	47.33	–	0	–	–	1	0
21	David Gillett	England	2001	2002	4	76	46*	25.33	7	0	–	–	3	0
22	Lee Peacock	England	2001	2002	4	14	8	4.66	192	7	3/65	23.85	1	0
23	Jason Coleman	Australia	2001	2001	3	46	26	46.00	180	3	1/26	35.33	0	0
24	Michael Kay	England	2001	2002	3	38	28*	38.00	96	0	–	–	1	0
25	Gary Sandford †	England	1999	2002	4	24	20	12.00	0	0	–	–	2	5
26	Alex Mutucumarana	England	2001	2001	1	29	29	29.00	6	0	–	–	0	0
27	Jon Cade	England	2001	2001	1	6	6	6.00	36	1	1/25	25.00	0	0
28	**Robert Rollins**	England	2002	2002	1	10	10	10.00	0	0	–	–	0	0
29	Andrew Wright	England	2002	2002	1	6	6	6.00	0	0	–	–	0	0
30	**Pieter Strydom**	South Africa	2002	2002	1	37	37	37.00	60	2	2/22	11.00	0	0
31	Nicholas Adams	England	2002	2002	1	31	31	31.00	60	1	1/54	54.00	0	0
32	**Danny Wilson** ♠	England	2002	2002	1	29	29	29.00	12	0	–	–	0	0

== List A captains ==
No.	Name	First	Last	Mat	Won	Lost	Tied	Win%
1	Adrian Cade	1999	1999	1	0	1	0	0%
2	Neil Rowlands	2000	2001	5	2	3	0	40%
3	Danny Wilson	2002	2002	1	0	1	0	0%
**Total**		1999	2002	**7**	**2**	**5**	**0**	**30.00%**
