= List of Yorkshire Cricket Board List A players =

A cricket team representing the Yorkshire Cricket Board played 10 List A cricket matches between 1999 and 2003. This is a list of the players who appeared in those matches.

- Jeremy Batty, 1 match, 1999
- Andrew Bethel, 10 matches, 1999–2003
- Paul Booth, 3 matches, 2000–2001
- Christopher Brice, 3 matches, 2001–2003
- Dan Broadbent, 1 match, 2002
- Gary Brook, 4 matches, 2000–2001
- Anthony Burton, 1 match, 1999
- John Carruthers, 6 matches, 1999–2001
- Steven Clark, 2 matches, 2002–2003
- Ian Dews, 1 match, 1999
- Matthew Doidge, 6 matches, 1999–2001
- Stephen Foster, 6 matches, 1999–2002
- Andrew Gale, 3 matches, 2001–2003
- Chris Gilbert, 1 match, 2002
- Neil Gill, 6 matches, 2000–2003
- Mark Gilliver, 4 matches, 1999–2001
- Lee Goddard, 2 matches, 2002–2003
- Christopher Gott, 1 match, 1999
- Peter Graham, 1 match, 1999
- Darren Harland, 4 matches, 2001–2003
- Martin Kellaway, 2 matches, 2001–2002
- Richard Kettleborough, 2 matches, 2000
- Greg Lambert, 1 match, 1999
- Richard McCarthy, 2 matches, 2000
- Anthony McKenna, 5 matches, 1999–2000
- Alan Mynett, 2 matches, 1999
- Steven Patterson, 2 matches, 2002–2003
- John Proud, 3 matches, 2000–2001
- Rich Pyrah, 4 matches, 2001–2003
- Gary Ramsden, 1 match, 2002
- Alex Roberts (cricketer), 1 match, 2002
- John Sadler, 1 match, 1999
- Christopher Siddall, 1 match, 2000
- David Stiff, 1 match, 2001
- Pieter Swanepoel, 4 matches, 2001–2003
- Nick Thornicroft, 1 match, 2001
- Andrew Walker, 3 matches, 1999–2000
- Lesroy Weekes, 1 match, 1999
- Simon Widdup, 3 matches, 2002–2003
- Richard Wilkinson, 4 matches, 2001–2002
