= Stovold =

Stovold is a surname. Notable people with the surname include:

- Andy Stovold (born 1953), English cricketer
- Martin Stovold (1955–2012), English cricketer
- Neil Stovold (born 1983), English cricketer
- Nicholas Stovold (born 1981), English cricketer

Graham Stovold - Compiler of the rules to Mornington Crescent
