= The Parks, Godmanchester =

Cricket ground in Godmanchester, England

The Parks
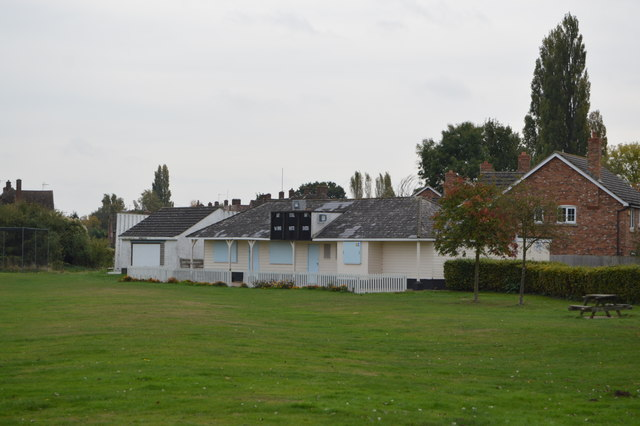

Ground information
- Location: Godmanchester, Huntingdonshire
- Coordinates: 52.3217°N 0.1709°W
- Establishment: c. 1972

Team information
Huntingdonshire	(2000–2001)
- As of 2 July 2010; Source: Ground profile

The Parks is a cricket ground situated off Fox Grove, Godmanchester, Huntingdonshire. The ground is bordered to the north and south by residential housing and to the east by the A14 road.

== History ==
Established between 1959 and 1972, the ground plays host to the home matches of Godmanchester Town Cricket Club. Huntingdonshire played two List A matches at the ground in the early 2000s, against the Yorkshire Cricket Board in the 2000 NatWest Trophy and the Gloucestershire Cricket Board in the 2002 Cheltenham & Gloucester Trophy, with both matches ending in five wicket defeats for Huntingdonshire. The county also played a single MCCA Knockout Trophy match at The Parks in 2001 against the Essex Cricket Board. Huntingdonshire soon after lost List A status and were excluded from the MCCA Knockout Trophy, (Note: Although considered one of the twenty-two Minor counties of English and Welsh cricket, Huntingdonshire never entered a team into any minor counties competitions until 1998, when it entered a team into the MCCA Knockout Trophy, while the following year it entered a team into the domestic List A competition. It continued to play in both competitions until 2002, after which the decision was taken to reduce the size of both competitions, with Huntingdonshire alongside the Cricket Boards of the first-class counties being excluded from future competitions) but have continued to play in minor fixtures at the ground.

== Records ==
=== List A ===
- Highest team total: 207/5 (45 overs) by Yorkshire Cricket Board v Huntingdonshire, 2000
- Lowest team total: 180/8 (50 overs) by Huntingdonshire v Gloucestershire Cricket Board, 2001
- Highest individual innings: 75 by Neil Stovold, as above
- Best bowling in an innings: 3/36 by James Rendell, as above

== See also ==
- List of cricket grounds in England and Wales
