= Nick Pishos =

Australian cricketer

Personal information
- Full name: Nicholas D Pishos
- Born: 28 September 1979 (age 47); Australia
- Batting: Right-handed
- Bowling: Right-arm fast-medium

Domestic team information
- Years: Team
- 2000: Huntingdonshire

Career statistics
Competition	List A
Matches	2
Runs scored	38
Batting average	19.00
100s/50s	0/0
Top score	38
Balls bowled	84
Wickets	3
Bowling average	18.33
5 wickets in innings	0
10 wickets in match	0
Best bowling	2/17
Catches/stumpings	2/–
- Source: Cricinfo, 31 May 2010

Nicholas D Pishos (born 28 September 1979) is a former Australian cricketer. Pishos is a right-handed batsman who bowls right-arm fast-medium.

Pishos played a number of trial matches for the Western Australia cricket team in 1999, playing in a South West team alongside future Australia internationals Marcus North, Chris Rogers and Adam Voges. He later briefly played county cricket in England for Huntingdonshire, making two List A appearances in the 2000 NatWest Trophy against the Hampshire Cricket Board at Grasmere Road, Cove, and the Yorkshire Cricket Board at The Parks, Godmanchester. In their first round match against the Hampshire Cricket Board, he was dismissed for a duck in Huntingdonshire's innings of 148/8 by Christopher Yates. During the Hampshire Cricket Board's chase, he took two catches and took the wickets of Rajesh Maru and James Tomlinson, to finish with figures of 2/17 from five overs, helping Huntingdonshire to 28 run victory. In their second round match against the Yorkshire Cricket Board, Pishos was dismissed for 38 runs in Huntingdonshire's innings of 204/8 by Paul Booth. In the Yorkshire Cricket Board's successful chase, he took the wicket of John Proud to finish with figures of 1/38 from nine overs.
