= Neil Rowlands =

English cricketer

Personal information
- Full name: Christopher Neil Rowlands
- Born: 2 July 1970 (age 56); Cambridge, Cambridgeshire, England
- Batting: Right-handed
- Bowling: Right-arm off break
- Relatives: Lois Rowlands (wife), Emily Rowlands and Isabelle Rowlands (children)

Domestic team information
- Years: Team
- 1999–2001: Huntingdonshire

Career statistics
Competition	LA
Matches	6
Runs scored	10
Batting average	–
100s/50s	–/-
Top score	6*
Balls bowled	300
Wickets	7
Bowling average	26.28
5 wickets in innings	–
10 wickets in match	–
Best bowling	2/32
Catches/stumpings	3/-
- Source: Cricinfo, 5 June 2010

Christopher Neil Rowlands (born 2 September 1970) is a former English cricketer. Rowlands was a right-handed batsman who bowled right-arm off break.

Rowlands made his List-A debut for Huntingdonshire in the 1999 NatWest Trophy against Bedfordshire at Wardown Park, Luton.

Rowlands next represented Huntingdonshire in List-A cricket in the 2000 NatWest Trophy against a Hampshire Cricket Board side and also played against a Yorkshire Cricket Board in the 2nd round of the same competition. He played 3 further List-A matches for Huntingdonshire, against Oxfordshire in the 1st round of the 2001 Cheltenham & Gloucester Trophy and a further game against Surrey Cricket Board in the 2nd round of the same competition. His final List-A match for the county came against a Gloucestershire Cricket Board side in the 1st round of the 2002 Cheltenham & Gloucester Trophy, which Huntingdonshire lost.

In his 6 List-A matches, he took 7 wickets at a bowling average of 26.28, with best figures of 2/32.
