= Anthony Burton =

Anthony Burton is the name of:

- Anthony Burton (cricketer, born 1975), former English cricketer
- Anthony Burton (Kent cricketer) (1785–1850), English cricketer
- Tony Burton (bishop) (born 1959), former Anglican Bishop of Saskatchewan
- Tony Burton (1937–2016), American actor
- Anthony Burton (curator), British museum curator
