= Andrew Wright =

Andrew Wright may refer to:

- Andrew Wright (artist) (born 1971), Canadian multimedia artist
- Andrew Wright (cricketer) (born 1980), English cricketer
- Andrew Wright (footballer) (born 1985), English footballer
- Andrew Barkworth Wright (1895–1971), British Army officer and colonial official
- Andrew Wright, guitarist and keyboardist of Panchiko

== See also ==
- Andy Wright (disambiguation)
