= Andrew Edwards (cricketer) =

English cricketer

Personal information
- Full name: Andrew Peter Edwards
- Born: 12 November 1978 (age 48); Delft, Netherlands
- Batting: Right-handed
- Bowling: Right-arm off break
- Relatives: Gordon Edwards (father)

Domestic team information
- Years: Team
- 1999–2000: Gloucestershire Cricket Board
- 1999–2001: Herefordshire

Career statistics
Competition	LA
Matches	6
Runs scored	96
Batting average	24.00
100s/50s	–/–
Top score	38
Balls bowled	216
Wickets	5
Bowling average	25.80
5 wickets in innings	–
10 wickets in match	–
Best bowling	3/38
Catches/stumpings	2/–
- Source: Cricinfo, 9 November 2010

Andrew Nicholas Edwards (born 12 November 1978) is a former English cricketer. Edwards was a right-handed batsman who bowled right-arm off break. He was born in Delft, Netherlands.

Edwards made his debut in List A cricket for the Gloucestershire Cricket Board against the Yorkshire Cricket Board in the 1999 NatWest Trophy. From 1999 to 2001, he represented the Board in 2 further List A matches. These came against the Nottinghamshire Cricket Board and the Yorkshire Cricket Board, both in the 2000 NatWest Trophy.

In 1999, Edwards also made his debut for Herefordshire in the Minor Counties Championship against Devon. In 2001, he played 3 further Championship matches for the county, the last of which came against Berkshire. In 2001, he played a single MCCA Knockout Trophy match for Herefordshire against the Warwickshire Cricket Board. Edwards also represented the county in List A cricket, making his debut for the county in that format against the Gloucestershire Cricket Board in the 2001 Cheltenham & Gloucester Trophy. He played 2 further matches in that season's competition against Middlesex, who they famously defeated by 3 wickets, and Worcestershire.

In his career total of 6 List A matches, he scored 96 runs at a batting average of 24.00, with a high score of 38. In the field he took 2 catches. With the ball he took 5 wickets at a bowling average of 25.80, with best figures of 3/38.

== Father ==
His father, Gordon, played first-class and List A cricket for Nottinghamshire in 1973.
