= 2006–07 National Division Two =

Rugby union competition in England

- Countries: England
- Champions: Esher
- Runners-up: Launceston (also promoted)
- Relegated: Harrogate, Barking, Bradford & Bingley RFC
- Attendance: 87,944 (average 491 per match) (Note: Note that 3 home attendances are missing (see below) - so the total attendance will not be 100% accurate. The average attendance has also been taken into account with the missing games not included.)
- Highest attendance: 2,144 Esher at home to Henley Hawks on 21 April 2007
- Lowest attendance: 115 Barking at home to Henley Hawks on 21 October 2006
- Top point scorer: (England) Neil Hallett; Esher 398 points
- Top try scorer: (England) Matt Moore; Esher 23 tries

The 2006–07 National Division Two was the seventh version (twentieth overall) of the third division of the English rugby union league system using the name National Division Two. New teams to the division included Bradford & Bingley (champions) and Nuneaton (playoffs) who were promoted from the 2005–06 National Division Three North, Cambridge who came up from the 2005–06 National Division Three South and no new teams joined from the previous season's National Division One due to the RFU's decision to expand that league from 14 to 16 teams and ending relegation for that season alone.

At the end of the season Esher were the clear league winners, beating second place Launceston to the title by 9 points and defeating the Cornish side home and away, with both sides being promoted to the 2007–08 National Division One. Relegated teams included Harrogate, Barking and newly promoted Bradford & Bingley. All three sides finished well below 11th placed Halifax with Harrogate only winning one game all season. Harrogate and Bradford & Bingley would drop to the 2007–08 National Division Three North while Barking would go down to the 2007–08 National Division Three South.

== Participating teams and locations ==
Locations of the 2006-07 National Division Two teams

Team	Stadium	Capacity	City/Area
Barking	Goresbrook	1,000	Becontree, Dagenham, London
Blackheath	Rectory Field	3,500 (500 seats)	Blackheath, London
Bradford & Bingley	Wagon Lane	4,000	Bingley, West Yorkshire
Cambridge	Grantchester Road	2,200 (200 seats)	Cambridge, Cambridgeshire
Esher	Molesey Road	3,000	Hersham, Surrey
Halifax	Ovenden Park		Halifax, West Yorkshire
Harrogate	Claro Road	4,500 (500 seats)	Harrogate, North Yorkshire
Henley Hawks	Dry Leas	4,000	Henley-on-Thames, Oxfordshire
Launceston	Polson Bridge	3,000	Launceston, Cornwall
Manchester	Grove Park	4,000	Cheadle Hulme, Greater Manchester
Nuneaton	Liberty Way	3,800 (500 seats)	Nuneaton, Warwickshire
Redruth	The Recreation Ground	3,500 (580 seats)	Redruth, Cornwall
Stourbridge	Stourton Park	3,500 (499 seats)	Stourbridge, West Midlands
Wharfedale	The Avenue	2,000	Threshfield, Craven, North Yorkshire

== Final league table ==
2006–07 National Division Two table
Pos	Team	Pld	W	D	L	PF	PA	PD	B	Pts	Qualification
1	Esher (C, P)	26	23	1	2	967	441	+526	21	115	Promoted
2	Launceston (P)	26	19	1	6	795	448	+347	18	96	Promoted
3	Henley Hawks	26	20	0	6	614	318	+296	15	95	
4	Redruth	26	19	1	6	726	406	+320	14	92	
5	Blackheath	26	16	0	10	687	527	+160	13	77	
6	Wharfedale	26	13	2	11	677	517	+160	18	74	
7	Stourbridge	26	13	0	13	661	537	+124	19	71	
8	Manchester	26	12	1	13	605	490	+115	14	64	
9	Cambridge	26	12	0	14	639	607	+32	13	61	
10	Nuneaton	26	12	0	14	600	573	+27	10	58	
11	Halifax	26	11	0	15	474	603	−129	9	53	
12	Bradford & Bingley (R)	26	5	0	21	410	942	−532	6	26	Relegated
13	Barking (R)	26	3	0	23	413	924	−511	4	16	Relegated
14	Harrogate (R)	26	1	0	25	261	1196	−935	2	6	Relegated

Source: National Clubs Association and BBC Sport: Updated 2007-04-16 --- Current English Leagues
(C) Champion; (P) Promoted; (R) Relegated

== Results ==
=== Round 1 ===
2 September 2006

Blackheath	19 - 6	Nuneaton
	Report

Rectory Field
Attendance: 850
Referee: Adrian Hartwell

2 September 2006

Bradford & Bingley	10 - 18	Manchester
	Report

Wagon Lane
Attendance: 200
Referee: Ian Robinson

2 September 2006

(BP) Esher	35 - 17	Wharfedale
	Report

Molesey Road
Attendance: 375
Referee: Ed Turnill

2 September 2006

(BP) Halifax	33 - 18	Barking
	Report

Ovenden Park
Attendance: 330
Referee: Terry Hall

2 September 2006

Harrogate	19 - 17	Cambridge (BP)
	Report

Claro Road
Attendance: 471
Referee: Andrew Vertigan

2 September 2006

(BP) Launceston	26 - 15	Henley Hawks
	Report

Polson Bridge
Referee: Glenn O'Hara

2 September 2006

Stourbridge	17 - 6	Redruth
	Report

Stourton Park
Attendance: 410
Referee: Alan Biggs

=== Round 2 ===
9 September 2006

Barking	6 - 32	Stourbridge (BP)
	Report

Goresbrook
Attendance: 200
Referee: Mark Varnon

9 September 2006

(BP) Bradford & Bingley	28 - 34	Nuneaton (BP)
	Report

Wagon Lane
Attendance: 266
Referee: Steve Lander

9 September 2006

(BP) Cambridge	39 - 28	Blackheath
	Report

Grantchester Road
Attendance: 550
Referee: Rowan Kitt

9 September 2006

(BP) Henley Hawks	39 - 7	Harrogate
	Report

Dry Leas
Attendance: 217
Referee: Richard Phillips

9 September 2006

Manchester	26 - 21	Halifax (BP)
	Report

Grove Park
Attendance: 317
Referee: Richard Draper

9 September 2006

Redruth	15 - 30	Esher (BP)
	Report

The Recreation Ground
Attendance: 684
Referee: Nigel Higginson

9 September 2006

Wharfedale	20 - 33	Launceston (BP)
	Report

The Avenue
Attendance: 373
Referee: Mark Wilson

=== Round 3 ===
16 September 2006

(BP) Blackheath	16 - 21	Henley Hawks
	Report

Rectory Field
Attendance: 700
Referee: G O'Hara

16 September 2006

(BP) Esher	46 - 12	Barking
	Report

Molesey Road
Attendance: 481
Referee: Terry Hall

16 September 2006

Halifax	12 - 10	Bradford & Bingley (BP)
	Report

Ovenden Park
Attendance: 625
Referee: Adrian Hartwell

16 September 2006

Harrogate	19 - 44	Wharfedale (BP)
	Report

Claro Road
Attendance: 830
Referee: Andrew Vertigan

16 September 2006

(BP) Launceston	33 - 19	Redruth
	Report

Polson Bridge
Attendance: 817
Referee: Ed Turnill

16 September 2006

Nuneaton	27 - 22	Cambridge (BP)
	Report

Liberty Way
Attendance: 200
Referee: Ian Robinson

16 September 2006

(BP) Stourbridge	31 - 24	Manchester (BP)
	Report

Stourton Park
Attendance: 400
Referee: Nigel Higginson

=== Round 4 ===
23 September 2006

Barking	22 - 49	Launceston (BP)
	Report

Goresbrook
Attendance: 160
Referee: Richard Phillips

23 September 2006

Bradford & Bingley	23 - 46	Stourbridge (BP)
	Report

Wagon Lane
Attendance: 280
Referee: Trevor Fisher

23 September 2006

Halifax	31 - 28	Nuneaton (BP)
	Report

Ovenden Park
Attendance: 406
Referee: Chris Sharp

23 September 2006

(BP) Henley Hawks	34 - 23	Cambridge
	Report

Dry Leas
Attendance: 418
Referee: Gareth Copsey

23 September 2006

Manchester	17 - 25	Esher
	Report

Grove Park
Attendance: 298
Referee: Mark Varnon

23 September 2006

(BP) Redruth	36 - 7	Harrogate
	Report

The Recreation Ground
Attendance: 643
Referee: Adrian Hartwell

23 September 2006

(BP) Wharfedale	14 - 15	Blackheath
	Report

The Avenue
Attendance: 400
Referee: Rob Sheard

=== Round 5 ===
30 September 2006

(BP) Blackheath	55 - 16	Redruth
	Report

Rectory Field
Attendance: 650
Referee: David Sainsbury

30 September 2006

Cambridge	22 - 16	Wharfedale (BP)
	Report

Grantchester Road
Attendance: 820
Referee: Ed Turnill

30 September 2006

(BP) Esher	49 - 21	Bradford & Bingley
	Report

Molesey Road
Attendance: 529
Referee: Brendan Fitzmaurice

30 September 2006

Harrogate	5 - 22	Barking
	Report

Claro Road
Attendance: 406
Referee: Ian Robinson

30 September 2006

Launceston	22 - 14	Manchester
	Report

Polson Bridge
Attendance: 642
Referee: Steve Harland

30 September 2006

Nuneaton	13 - 23	Henley Hawks
	Report

Liberty Way
Referee: Richard Parker-Sedgmore

30 September 2006

(BP) Stourbridge	3 - 6	Halifax
	Report

Stourton Park
Attendance: 450
Referee: Rob Sheard

=== Round 6 ===
7 October 2006

Barking	19 - 30	Blackheath (BP)
	Report

Goresbrook
Attendance: 280
Referee: Mark Varnon

7 October 2006

Bradford & Bingley	24 - 23	Launceston (BP)
	Report

Wagon Lane
Attendance: 240
Referee: Andrew Vertigan

7 October 2006

Halifax	18 - 38	Esher (BP)
	Report

Ovenden Park
Attendance: 400
Referee: Steve Lander

7 October 2006

(BP) Manchester	63 - 12	Harrogate
	Report

Grove Park
Attendance: 298
Referee: Nick Williams

7 October 2006

(BP) Redruth	32 - 16	Cambridge
	Report

The Recreation Ground
Attendance: 721
Referee: Nigel Higginson

7 October 2006

(BP) Stourbridge	20 - 22	Nuneaton
	Report

Stourton Park
Attendance: 400
Referee: Terry Hall

7 October 2006

Wharfedale	3 - 19	Henley Hawks
	Report

The Avenue
Attendance: 450
Referee: Adrian Hartwell

=== Round 7 ===
14 October 2006

(BP) Blackheath	43 - 17	Manchester
	Report

Rectory Field
Attendance: 650
Referee: Nigel Higginson

14 October 2006

(BP) Cambridge	29 - 15	Barking
	Report

Grantchester Road
Attendance: 520
Referee: Ed Turnill

14 October 2006

(BP) Esher	32 - 22	Stourbridge
	Report

Molesey Road
Attendance: 672
Referee: Richard Phillips

14 October 2006

(BP) Harrogate	19 - 26	Bradford & Bingley
	Report

Claro Road
Attendance: 488
Referee: Chris Sharp

14 October 2006

(BP) Henley Hawks	19 - 23	Redruth
	Report

Dry Leas
Attendance: 452
Referee: Alan Biggs

14 October 2006

(BP) Launceston	38 - 11	Halifax
	Report

Polson Bridge
Attendance: 650
Referee: Terry Hall

14 October 2006

Nuneaton	20 - 6	Wharfedale
	Report

Liberty Way
Attendance: 320
Referee: Brendan Fitzmaurice

=== Round 8 ===
21 October 2006

Barking	5 - 19	Henley Hawks
	Report

Goresbrook
Attendance: 115
Referee: Richard Phillips

21 October 2006

(BP) Bradford & Bingley	10 - 17	Blackheath
	Report

Wagon Lane
Attendance: 350
Referee: Rob Sheard

21 October 2006

(BP) Esher	55 - 3	Nuneaton
	Report

Molesey Road
Attendance: 572
Referee: Ed Turnill

21 October 2006

(BP) Halifax	42 - 3	Harrogate
	Report

Ovenden Park
Attendance: 420
Referee: Trevor Fisher

21 October 2006

(BP) Manchester	29 - 10	Cambridge
	Report

Grove Park
Attendance: 235
Referee: Mark Wilson

21 October 2006

(BP) Redruth	29 - 3	Wharfedale
	Report

The Recreation Ground
Attendance: 788
Referee: Mark Varnon

21 October 2006

Stourbridge	28 - 27	Launceston (2BP)
	Report

Stourton Park
Attendance: 350
Referee: Nigel Higginson

=== Round 9 ===
28 October 2006

(BP) Blackheath	42 - 27	Halifax (BP)
	Report

Rectory Field
Attendance: 650
Referee: David Sainsbury

28 October 2006

(BP) Cambridge	41 - 17	Bradford & Bingley
	Report

Grantchester Road
Attendance: 480
Referee: Ed Turnill

28 October 2006

Harrogate	14 - 47	Stourbridge (BP)
	Report

Claro Road
Attendance: 407
Referee: Brendan Fitzmaurice

28 October 2006

Henley Hawks	12 - 5	Manchester (BP)
	Report

Dry Leas
Referee: Richard Parker-Sedgmore

28 October 2006

Launceston	19 - 33	Esher
	Report

Polson Bridge
Attendance: 1,021
Referee: Alan Biggs

28 October 2006

(BP) Nuneaton	16 - 22	Redruth
	Report

Liberty Way
Attendance: 352
Referee: Ian Robinson

28 October 2006

(BP) Wharfedale	46 - 5	Barking
	Report

The Avenue
Attendance: 400
Referee: Richard Draper

=== Round 10 ===
4 November 2006

Barking	15 - 41	Redruth (BP)
	Report

Goresbrook
Attendance: 290
Referee: Greg Garner

4 November 2006

(BP) Bradford & Bingley	10 - 16	Henley Hawks
	Report

Wagon Lane
Attendance: 240
Referee: Brendan Fitzmaurice

4 November 2006

(BP) Esher	67 - 0	Harrogate
	Report

Molesey Road
Attendance: 525
Referee: JP Doyle

4 November 2006

Halifax	17 - 13	Cambridge (BP)
	Report

Ovenden Park
Attendance: 390
Referee: Steve Lander

4 November 2006

(BP) Launceston	40 - 17	Nuneaton
	Report

Polson Bridge
Attendance: 580
Referee: Terry Hall

4 November 2006

Manchester	14 - 22	Wharfedale (BP)
	Report

Grove Park
Attendance: 307
Referee: Keith Lewis

4 November 2006

(BP) Stourbridge	43 - 24	Blackheath
	Report

Stourton Park
Attendance: 405
Referee: Trevor Fisher

=== Round 11 ===
11 November 2006

Blackheath	10 - 46	Esher (BP)
	Report

Rectory Field
Attendance: 900
Referee: Nigel Higginson

11 November 2006

Cambridge	10 - 32	Stourbridge (BP)
	Report

Grantchester Road
Attendance: 480
Referee: Brendan Fitzmaurice

11 November 2006

Harrogate	0 - 62	Launceston (BP)
	Report

Claro Road
Attendance: 204
Referee: Steve Lander

11 November 2006

(BP) Henley Hawks	34 - 13	Halifax
	Report

Dry Leas
Attendance: 344
Referee: Ed Turnill

11 November 2006

(BP) Nuneaton	28 - 10	Barking
	Report

Liberty Way
Attendance: 380
Referee: Andrew Taylorson

11 November 2006

Redruth	24 - 3	Manchester
	Report

The Recreation Ground
Attendance: 801
Referee: Richard Parker-Sedgmore

11 November 2006

Wharfedale	18 - 10	Bradford & Bingley
	Report

The Avenue
Attendance: 450
Referee: David Sainsbury

=== Round 12 ===
25 November 2006

Bradford & Bingley	7 - 33	Redruth (BP)
	Report

Wagon Lane
Attendance: 225
Referee: Mark Varnon

25 November 2006

(BP) Esher	34 - 13	Cambridge
	Report

Molesey Road
Attendance: 410
Referee: Brendan Fitzmaurice

25 November 2006

(BP) Halifax	32 - 22	Wharfedale (BP)
	Report

Ovenden Park
Attendance: 784
Referee: Ed Turnill

25 November 2006

Harrogate	7 - 34	Nuneaton (BP)
	Report

Claro Road
Attendance: 187
Referee: Rob Sheard

25 November 2006

Launceston	16 - 13	Blackheath (BP)
	Report

Polson Bridge
Attendance: 506
Referee: Richard Phillips

25 November 2006

Manchester	13 - 24	Barking (BP)
	Report

Grove Park
Attendance: 187
Referee: Alan Biggs

25 November 2006

Stourbridge	7 - 17	Henley Hawks
	Report

Stourton Park
Attendance: 300
Referee: Richard Parker-Sedgmore

=== Round 13 ===
2 December 2006

(BP) Barking	17 - 21	Bradford & Bingley
	Report

Goresbrook
Attendance: 200
Referee: Adrian Hartwell

2 December 2006

(BP) Blackheath	42 - 15	Harrogate
	Report

Rectory Field
Attendance: 650

2 December 2006

(BP) Cambridge	27 - 32	Launceston
	Report

Grantchester Road
Attendance: 440
Referee: JP Doyle

2 December 2006

Henley Hawks	5 - 20	Esher
	Report

Dry Leas
Attendance: 505
Referee: Terry Hall

2 December 2006

Nuneaton	23 - 11	Manchester
	Report

Liberty Way
Attendance: 138
Referee: Steve Lander

2 December 2006

(BP) Redruth	24 - 8	Halifax
	Report

The Recreation Ground
Attendance: 842
Referee: Rob Sheard

2 December 2006

(BP) Wharfedale	30 - 23	Stourbridge (BP)
	Report

The Avenue
Attendance: 400
Referee: Trevor Fisher

=== Round 14 ===
16 December 2006

Blackheath	23 - 3	Cambridge
	Report

Rectory Field
Attendance: 570
Referee: Brendan Fitzmaurice

16 December 2006

Esher	23 - 19	Redruth (BP)
	Report

Molesey Road
Attendance: 630
Referee: Nick Williams

16 December 2006

Halifax	15 - 25	Manchester (BP)
	Report

Ovenden Park
Attendance: 312
Referee: Adrian Hartwell

16 December 2006

Harrogate	21 - 42	Henley Hawks (BP)
	Report

Claro Road
Attendance: 296
Referee: Andrew Taylorson

16 December 2006

(2BP) Launceston	31 - 32	Wharfedale (BP)
	Report

Polson Bridge
Attendance: 521
Referee: Ed Turnill

16 December 2006

(BP) Nuneaton	31 - 20	Bradford & Bingley
	Report

Liberty Way
Attendance: 325
Referee: Richard Parker-Sedgmore

16 December 2006

(BP) Stourbridge	39 - 31	Barking (BP)
	Report

Stourton Park
Attendance: 300
Referee: JP Doyle

=== Round 15 ===
23 December 2006

Barking	25 - 42	Esher (BP)
	Report

Goresbrook
Attendance: 340
Referee: David Sainsbury

23 December 2006

Bradford & Bingley	13 - 27	Halifax (BP)
	Report

Wagon Lane
Attendance: 576
Referee: Brendan Fitzmaurice

23 December 2006

Cambridge	16 - 6	Nuneaton
	Report

Grantchester Road
Attendance: 560
Referee: Adrian Hartwell

23 December 2006

(BP) Henley Hawks	30 - 8	Blackheath
	Report

Dry Leas
Attendance: 456
Referee: Chris Sharp

23 December 2006

(BP) Manchester	33 - 14	Stourbridge
	Report

Grove Park
Attendance: 341
Referee: Keith Lewis

23 December 2006

(BP) Redruth	9 - 14	Launceston
	Report

The Recreation Ground
Attendance: 1,507
Referee: Alan Biggs

23 December 2006

(BP) Wharfedale	67 - 0	Harrogate
	Report

The Avenue
Attendance: 950
Referee: Ian Robinson

=== Round 16 ===
6 January 2007

(BP) Blackheath	25 - 19	Wharfedale (BP)
	Report

Rectory Field
Attendance: 465
Referee: Adrian Hartwell

6 January 2007

Cambridge	11 - 6	Henley Hawks (BP)
	Report

Grantchester Road
Attendance: 435
Referee: Brendan Fitzmaurice

6 January 2007

(BP) Esher	10 - 12	Manchester
	Report

Molesey Road
Attendance: 690
Referee: Richard Phillips

6 January 2007

Harrogate	6 - 45	Redruth (BP)
	Report

Claro Road
Attendance: 304
Referee: Ed Turnill

6 January 2007

(BP) Launceston	31 - 10	Barking
	Report

Polson Bridge
Attendance: 613
Referee: Keith Lewis

6 January 2007

Nuneaton	15 - 10	Halifax (BP)
	Report

Liberty Way
Attendance: 360
Referee: Andrew Vertigan

6 January 2007

(BP) Stourbridge	32 - 3	Bradford & Bingley
	Report

Stourton Park
Attendance: 300
Referee: Richard Parker-Sedgmore

=== Round 17 ===
13 January 2007

(BP) Barking	34 - 11	Harrogate
	Report

Goresbrook
Attendance: 160
Referee: JP Doyle

13 January 2007

Halifax	15 - 14	Stourbridge (BP)
	Report

Ovenden Park
Attendance: 551
Referee: Trevor Fisher

13 January 2007

(BP) Henley Hawks	22 - 10	Nuneaton
	Report

Dry Leas
Attendance: 356
Referee: Nigel Higginson

13 January 2007

Manchester	14 - 14	Launceston
	Report

Grove Park
Attendance: 297
Referee: Gareth Copsey

13 January 2007

(BP) Redruth	28 - 14	Blackheath
	Report

The Recreation Ground
Attendance: 878
Referee: David Sainsbury

13 January 2007

(BP) Wharfedale	36 - 6	Cambridge
	Report

The Avenue
Attendance: 500
Referee: Ian Robinson

13 January 2007

Bradford & Bingley	P - P	Esher

- Postponed. Game rescheduled to 7 April 2007.

=== Round 18 ===
27 January 2007

(BP) Blackheath	47 - 17	Barking
	Report

Rectory Field
Attendance: 670
Referee: Ed Turnill

27 January 2007

Cambridge	10 - 29	Redruth (BP)
	Report

Grantchester Road
Attendance: 460
Referee: Andrew Taylorson

27 January 2007

(BP) Esher	50 - 0	Halifax
	Report

Molesey Road
Attendance: 980
Referee: Andrew Vertigan

27 January 2007

Harrogate	22 - 32	Manchester (BP)
	Report

Claro Road
Attendance: 289
Referee: Ian Robinson

27 January 2007

(BP) Henley Hawks	37 - 8	Wharfedale
	Report

Dry Leas
Attendance: 385
Referee: JP Doyle

27 January 2007

Nuneaton	26 - 16	Stourbridge
	Report

Liberty Way
Attendance: 340
Referee: Keith Lewis

27 January 2007

Launceston	P - P	Bradford & Bingley

- Postponed. Game rescheduled to 24 March 2007.

=== Round 19 ===
3 February 2007

Barking	15 - 38	Cambridge (BP)
	Report

Goresbrook
Attendance: 200
Referee: JP Doyle

3 February 2007

Bradford & Bingley	25 - 21	Harrogate (BP)
	Report

Wagon Lane
Attendance: 250
Referee: Mark Wilson

3 February 2007

Halifax	13 - 30	Launceston (BP)
	Report

Ovenden Park
Attendance: 312
Referee: Brendan Fitzmaurice

3 February 2007

Manchester	9 - 8	Blackheath (BP)
	Report

Grove Park
Attendance: 290
Referee: Nigel Higginson

3 February 2007

Redruth	13 - 10	Henley Hawks (BP)
	Report

The Recreation Ground
Attendance: 865
Referee: Steve Leyshon

3 February 2007

(BP) Stourbridge	24 - 28	Esher
	Report

Stourton Park
Attendance: 400
Referee: Chris Sharp

3 February 2007

(BP) Wharfedale	42 - 22	Nuneaton
	Report

The Avenue
Attendance: 360
Referee: Richard Parker-Sedgmore

=== Round 20 ===
17 February 2007

(BP) Blackheath	75 - 7	Bradford & Bingley
	Report

Rectory Field
Attendance: 520
Referee: Rowan Kitt

17 February 2007

Cambridge	28 - 27	Manchester (2BP)
	Report

Grantchester Road
Attendance: 575
Referee: Keith Lewis

17 February 2007

Harrogate	18 - 28	Halifax
	Report

Claro Road
Attendance: 242
Referee: Ian Robinson

17 February 2007

(BP) Henley Hawks	44 - 0	Barking
	Report

Dry Leas
Attendance: 405
Referee: Richard Phillips

17 February 2007

(BP) Launceston	34 - 16	Stourbridge
	Report

Polson Bridge
Attendance: 623
Referee: Nick Williams

17 February 2007

Wharfedale	9 - 9	Redruth
	Report

The Avenue
Attendance: 650
Referee: Andrew Taylorson

17 February 2007

Nuneaton	P - P	Esher

- Postponed. Game rescheduled to 24 March 2007.

=== Round 21 ===
3 March 2007

Barking	18 - 52	Wharfedale (BP)
	Report

Goresbrook
Attendance: 200
Referee: Rowan Kitt

3 March 2007

Bradford & Bingley	16 - 57	Cambridge (BP)
	Report

Wagon Lane
Attendance: 200
Referee: Chris Sharp

3 March 2007

(BP) Esher	39 - 19	Launceston
	Report

Molesey Road
Attendance: 1,000
Referee: Richard Phillips

3 March 2007

(BP) Halifax	10 - 12	Blackheath
	Report

Ovenden Park
Attendance: 321
Referee: Andrew Taylorson

3 March 2007

Manchester	8 - 32	Henley Hawks (BP)
	Report

Grove Park
Attendance: 387
Referee: Andrew Vertigan

3 March 2007

Redruth	27 - 12	Nuneaton
	Report

The Recreation Ground
Attendance: 757
Referee: Ian Robinson

3 March 2007

(BP) Stourbridge	46 - 3	Harrogate
	Report

Stourton Park
Attendance: 400
Referee: Ed Turnill

=== Round 22 ===
17 March 2007

(BP) Blackheath	32 - 21	Stourbridge
	Report

Rectory Field
Attendance: 623
Referee: Nigel Higginson

17 March 2007

Cambridge	15 - 11	Halifax (BP)
	Report

Grantchester Road
Attendance: 425
Referee: Ian Robinson

17 March 2007

Harrogate	12 - 34	Esher (BP)
	Report

Claro Road
Attendance: 242
Referee: Keith Lewis

17 March 2007

(BP) Henley Hawks	27 - 12	Bradford & Bingley
	Report

Dry Leas
Attendance: 270
Referee: Richard Parker-Sedgmore

17 March 2007

Nuneaton	15 - 27	Launceston
	Report

Liberty Way
Attendance: 582
Referee: Brendan Fitzmaurice

17 March 2007

(BP) Redruth	55 - 10	Barking
	Report

The Recreation Ground
Attendance: 759
Referee: Eric Woodmason

17 March 2007

Wharfedale	13 - 8	Manchester (BP)
	Report

The Avenue
Attendance: 400
Referee: Steve Harland

=== Rounds 18 & 20 (rescheduled games) ===
24 March 2007

(BP) Launceston	54 - 14	Bradford & Bingley
	Report

Polson Bridge
Attendance: 702
Referee: Keith Lewis

- Game rescheduled from 27 January 2007.

24 March 2007

(BP) Nuneaton	29 - 34	Esher (BP)
	Report

Liberty Way
Attendance: 233
Referee: Dale Newitt

- Game rescheduled from 17 February 2007.

=== Round 23 ===
31 March 2007

Barking	13 - 34	Nuneaton (BP)
	Report

Goresbrook
Attendance: 200
Referee: Ian Robinson

31 March 2007

Bradford & Bingley	10 - 44	Wharfedale (BP)
	Report

Wagon Lane
Attendance: 400
Referee: Andrew Taylorson

31 March 2007

(BP) Esher	39 - 12	Blackheath
	Report

Molesey Road
Attendance: 1,790
Referee: Richard Parker-Sedgmore

31 March 2007

Halifax	16 - 32	Henley Hawks (BP)
	Report

Ovenden Park
Attendance: 420
Referee: Steve Lander

31 March 2007

(BP) Launceston	56 - 0	Harrogate
	Report

Polson Bridge
Attendance: 745
Referee: Darren Gamage

31 March 2007

(BP) Manchester	18 - 23	Redruth
	Report

Grove Park
Attendance: 307
Referee: Mark Wilson

31 March 2007

(BP) Stourbridge	26 - 20	Cambridge (BP)
	Report

Stourton Park
Attendance: 450
Referee: Nigel Higginson

=== Round 17 (rescheduled game) ===
7 April 2007

Bradford & Bingley	28 - 57	Esher (BP)
	Report

Wagon Lane
Attendance: 600
Referee: Ed Turnill

- Game rescheduled from 13 January 2007.

=== Round 24 ===
14 April 2007

Barking	15 - 70	Manchester (BP)
	Report

Goresbrook
Attendance: 150

14 April 2007

Blackheath	6- 20	Launceston
	Report

Rectory Field
Attendance: 950
Referee: Nigel Higginson

14 April 2007

(BP) Cambridge	40 - 37	Esher (2BP)
	Report

Grantchester Road
Attendance: 640
Referee: Richard Draper

14 April 2007

Henley Hawks	15 - 5	Stourbridge
	Report

Dry Leas
Attendance: 395
Referee: Nick Williams

14 April 2007

(BP) Nuneaton	90 - 0	Harrogate
	Report

Liberty Way
Attendance: 250
Referee: David Sainsbury

14 April 2007

(BP) Redruth	78 - 3	Bradford & Bingley
	Report

The Recreation Ground
Attendance: 747
Referee: Eric Woodmason

14 April 2007

(BP) Wharfedale	36 - 11	Halifax
	Report

The Avenue
Attendance: 520
Referee: Adrian Hartwell

=== Round 25 ===
21 April 2007

(BP) Bradford & Bingley	42 - 30	Barking
	Report

Wagon Lane
Attendance: 150
Referee: Darren Gamage

21 April 2007

Esher	28 - 13	Henley Hawks
	Report

Molesey Road
Attendance: 2,144
Referee: Gareth Copsey

21 April 2007

Halifax	20 - 39	Redruth (BP)
	Report

Ovenden Park
Attendance: 533
Referee: Brendan Fitzmaurice

21 April 2007

Harrogate	15 - 49	Blackheath (BP)
	Report

Claro Road
Attendance: 220
Referee: Chris Sharp

21 April 2007

(BP) Launceston	38 - 6	Cambridge
	Report

Polson Bridge
Attendance: 1,291
Referee: Rowan Kitt

21 April 2007

(BP) Manchester	30 - 19	Nuneaton
	Report

Grove Park
Attendance: 310
Referee: Trevor Fisher

21 April 2007

(BP) Stourbridge	29 - 24	Wharfedale (2BP)
	Report

Stourton Park
Referee: 500

=== Round 26 ===
28 April 2007

Barking	5 - 27	Halifax
	Report

Goresbrook
Attendance: 185
Referee: Richard Parker-Sedgmore

28 April 2007

(BP) Cambridge	107 - 5	Harrogate
	Report

Grantchester Road
Attendance: 1,050
Referee: Brendan Fitzmaurice

28 April 2007

(BP) Henley Hawks	31 - 7	Launceston
	Report

Dry Leas
Attendance: 695
Referee: Nigel Higginson

28 April 2007

(BP) Manchester	66 - 0	Bradford & Bingley
	Report

Grove Park
Attendance: 420
Referee: Darren Gamage

28 April 2007

(BP) Nuneaton	20 - 22	Blackheath
	Report

Liberty Way
Attendance: 275
Referee: Ian Robinson

28 April 2007

(BP) Redruth	32 - 28	Stourbridge (2BP)
	Report

The Recreation Ground
Attendance: 1,020
Referee: Trevor Fisher

28 April 2007

(BP) Wharfedale	36 - 36	Esher
	Report

The Avenue
Attendance: 528
Referee: Andrew Vertigan

== Total season attendances ==
Club	Home Games	Total	Average	Highest	Lowest	% Capacity
Barking	13	2,680	206	340	115	21%
Blackheath	13	8,848	681	950	465	19%
Bradford & Bingley	13	3,977	306	600	150	8%
Cambridge	13	7,435	572	1,050	425	26%
Esher	13	10,798	831	2,144	375	28%
Halifax	13	5,804	446	784	312	N/A
Harrogate	13	4,586	353	830	187	8%
Henley Hawks	12 (Note: Missing home attendance v Manchester on 28 October 2006.)	4,898	408	695	217	10%
Launceston	12 (Note: Missing home attendance v Henley Hawks on 2 September 2006.)	8,711	726	1,291	506	24%
Manchester	13	3,994	307	420	187	8%
Nuneaton	12 (Note: Missing home attendance v Henley Hawks on 30 September 2006.)	3,755	313	582	138	8%
Redruth	13	11,012	847	1,507	643	24%
Stourbridge	13	5,065	390	500	300	11%
Wharfedale	13	6,381	491	950	360	25%

== Individual statistics ==
- Note that points scorers includes tries as well as conversions, penalties and drop goals.

=== Top points scorers ===
Rank	Player	Team	Appearances	Points
1	(England) Neil Hallett	Esher	24	398
2	(England) Alastair Bressington	Stourbridge	25	290
3	(Wales) Michael Hook	Redruth	25	271
4	(Wales) Gareth Cull	Nuneaton	24	254
4	(New Zealand) Sam Young	Launceston	25	254
5	(England) Frankie Neale	Blackheath	20	237
6	(England) Mark Bedworth	Wharfedale	20	209
7	(England) Mitch Burton	Henley Hawks	22	194
8	(Wales) Dafydd Lewis	Cambridge	25	161
9	(England) Gareth Wynne	Manchester	23	147

=== Top try scorers ===
Rank	Player	Team	Appearances	Tries
1	(England) Matt Moore	Esher	23	23
2	(New Zealand) Mark Bright	Redruth	21	21
2	(South Africa) Christoff Lombaard	Cambridge	25	21
3	(England) Alastair Bressington	Stourbridge	25	19
4	(South Africa) Chris Malherbe	Wharfedale	22	14
5	(England) Simon Horsfall	Wharfedale	25	14
5	(England) Duncan Cormack	Esher	26	14
6	(England) Mark Bedworth	Wharfedale	20	13
6	(England) Matthew J Williams	Stourbridge	24	13
7	(England) Richard Briggs	Esher	25	12

== Season records ==
=== Team ===
Largest home win — 102 pts

107 - 5 Cambridge at home to Harrogate on 28 April 2007

Largest away win — 65 pts

70 - 15 Manchester away to Barking on 14 April 2007

Most points scored — 107 pts

107 - 5 Cambridge at home to Harrogate on 28 April 2007

Most tries in a match — 17

Cambridge at home to Harrogate on 28 April 2007

Most conversions in a match — 11

Cambridge at home to Harrogate on 28 April 2007

Most penalties in a match — 7

Esher away to Stourbridge on 3 February 2007

Most drop goals in a match — 2 (x2)

Henley Hawks away to Halifax on 31 March 2007
Henley Hawks away to Esher on 21 April 2007

=== Player ===
Most points in a match — 31 (x2)

(England) Alastair Bressington for Stourbridge away to Bradford & Bingley on 23 September 2006
(England) Neil Hallett for Esher away to Blackheath on 11 November 2006

Most tries in a match — 5

(South Africa) Christoff Lombaard for Cambridge at home to Harrogate on 28 April 2007

Most conversions in a match — 11

(Wales) Dafydd Lewis for Cambridge at home to Harrogate on 28 April 2007

Most penalties in a match — 7

(England) Neil Hallett for Esher away to Stourbridge on 3 February 2007

Most drop goals in a match — 2 (x2)

(England) Mitch Burton for Henley Hawks away to Halifax on 31 March 2007
(England) Mitch Burton for Henley Hawks away to Esher on 21 April 2007

=== Attendances ===
Highest — 2,144

Esher at home to Henley Hawks on 21 April 2007

Lowest — 115

Barking at home to Henley Hawks on 21 October 2006

Highest Average Attendance — 847

Redruth

Lowest Average Attendance — 206

Barking

== See also ==
- English Rugby Union Leagues
- English rugby union system
- Rugby union in England
