= Nicholas Stovold =

English cricketer

Personal information
- Full name: Nicholas Craig Stovold
- Born: 18 June 1981 (age 45); Bristol, England
- Batting: Right-handed
- Relatives: Andy Stovold (father), Neil Stovold (brother), Martin Stovold (uncle)

Domestic team information
- Years: Team
- 2002–2003: Shropshire
- 2000–2001: Gloucestershire Cricket Board

Career statistics
Competition	LA
Matches	5
Runs scored	86
Batting average	17.20
100s/50s	–/–
Top score	33
Balls bowled	–
Wickets	–
Bowling average	–
5 wickets in innings	–
10 wickets in match	–
Best bowling	–
Catches/stumpings	2/–
- Source: Cricinfo, 9 November 2010

Nicholas Craig Stovold (born 8 June 1981) is an English cricketer. Stovold is a right-handed batsman. He was born in Bristol.

Stovold represented the Gloucestershire Cricket Board in List A cricket. His debut List A match came against the Nottinghamshire Cricket Board in the 2000 NatWest Trophy. From 2000 to 2001, he represented the Board in 5 List A matches, the last of which came against the Yorkshire Cricket Board in the 2nd round of the 2002 Cheltenham & Gloucester Trophy which was played in 2001. In his 5 List A matches, he scored 86 runs at a batting average of 17.20, with a high score of 33. In the field he took 2 catches.

In 2002 he made his Minor Counties Championship debut for Shropshire against Wiltshire. He represented the county in 2 further Championship matches, which came against Dorset in 2002 and Devon in 2003. Stolvold played a single MCCA Knockout Trophy match for the county in 2002 against Staffordshire.

== Family ==
His father, Andy, played first-class cricket for Gloucestershire, Orange Free State and the Marylebone Cricket Club. His uncle, Martin, played first-class cricket for Gloucestershire. His brother, Neil, also played List A cricket for the Gloucestershire Cricket Board.
