= Tog Humphreys =

English cricketer (born 1968)

Tog Humphreys (born Edward Humphreys on 25 April 1968) was an English cricketer. He was a right-handed batsman and right-arm medium-pace bowler who played for Huntingdonshire. He was born in Bedford.

Humphreys made a single List A appearance for the side, during the 2000 NatWest Trophy, against Yorkshire Cricket Board. From the middle order, he scored a duck.
