= Jonathan White (cricketer) =

English cricketer

Personal information
- Full name: Jonathan William White
- Born: 21 August 1979 (age 47); Bristol, England
- Batting: Right-handed
- Bowling: Left-arm medium

Domestic team information
- Years: Team
- 1999–2002: Gloucestershire Cricket Board

Career statistics
Competition	LA
Matches	7
Runs scored	58
Batting average	14.50
100s/50s	–/–
Top score	29
Balls bowled	379
Wickets	11
Bowling average	15.63
5 wickets in innings	–
10 wickets in match	–
Best bowling	4/14
Catches/stumpings	–/–
- Source: Cricinfo, 9 November 2010

Jonathan William White (born 21 August 1979) is a former English cricketer. White was a right-handed batsman who bowled left-arm medium pace. He was born in Bristol.

White represented the Gloucestershire Cricket Board in List A cricket. His debut List A match came against the Yorkshire Cricket Board in the 1999 NatWest Trophy. From 1999 to 2002, he represented the Board in seven List A matches, the last of which came against the Surrey Cricket Board in the 1st round of the 2003 Cheltenham & Gloucester Trophy played in 2002. In his five List A matches, he scored 58 runs at a batting average of 14.50, with a high score of 29. As bowler, he took 11 wickets at a bowling average of 15.63, with best figures of 4/14.

== See also ==
- Cricket in England
- English cricketers
