= Alex Roberts =

Alex Roberts may refer to:

- Alex Roberts (cricketer), an English cricket player
- Alex Roberts (game designer), a Canadian role-playing game designer

== See also ==
- Alexander Roberts
