= Gary Brook (cricketer) =

English cricketer (born 1968)

Personal information
- Full name: Gary Brook
- Born: 25 November 1968 (age 57); Leeds, Yorkshire, England
- Batting: Right-handed
- Role: Wicketkeeper

Domestic team information
- Years: Team
- 2000–2001: Yorkshire Cricket Board

Career statistics
| Competition | LA |
|---|---|
| Matches | 4 |
| Runs scored | 3 |
| Batting average | 3.00 |
| 100s/50s | –/– |
| Top score | 3 |
| Balls bowled | – |
| Wickets | – |
| Bowling average | – |
| 5 wickets in innings | – |
| 10 wickets in match | – |
| Best bowling | – |
| Catches/stumpings | 5/– |
- Source: Cricinfo, 4 November 2010

Gary Brook (born 25 November 1968) is a former English cricketer. Brook was a right-handed batsman who played primarily as a wicketkeeper. He was born in Leeds, Yorkshire.

Brook's represented the Yorkshire Cricket Board in List A cricket. His debut List A match came against Huntingdonshire in the 2000 NatWest Trophy. From 2000 to 2001, he represented the Board in 4 List A matches, the last of which came against the Northamptonshire Cricket Board in the 2001 Cheltenham & Gloucester Trophy. In his 4 List A matches, he batted twice, scoring 3 runs. Behind the stumps he took 5 catches.
