= Andrew Walker =

Andrew Walker may refer to:

- Andrew Walker (actor) (born 1979), Canadian actor and producer
- Andrew Walker (barrister) (born 1968), Oxfordshire Assistant Deputy Coroner
- Andrew Walker (cricketer) (born 1971), former English cricketer
- Andrew Walker (footballer) (born 1986), Australian rules footballer with Carlton
- Andrew Walker (murderer) (c. 1954–2021), British murderer
- Andrew Walker (politician) (1855–1934), New Zealand politician
- Andrew Walker (rugby) (born 1973), Australian rugby league and union footballer
- Andrew Barclay Walker (1824–1893), brewer and Liverpool councillor
- Andrew Kevin Walker (born 1964), American screenwriter

== See also ==
- Andy Walker (disambiguation)
