= Malton =

Malton may refer to:

== Places ==
- Malton, California, United States
- Malton, North Yorkshire, England
  - Malton (UK Parliament constituency)
- Malton, Ontario, Canada
  - Malton GO Station, station in the GO Transit network located in the community
- A fictional town featured in the MMORPG Urban Dead
- Malton Range, a mountain range in Canada

== People ==
- Thomas Malton (1748–1804), English painter of topographical and architectural views, and an engraver
- James Malton (died 1803), architectural draughtsman, son of Thomas Malton
- Jackie Malton (born 1951), UK television script consultant and former senior police officer
- Chris Malton (born 1969), English cricketer
