= Alan Mynett =

English cricketer

Personal information
- Born: 5 August 1966 (age 60); Barnsley, Yorkshire, England
- Batting: Right-handed
- Role: Wicketkeeper

Domestic team information
- Years: Team
- 1999: Yorkshire Cricket Board

Career statistics
Competition	LA
Matches	2
Runs scored	38
Batting average	19.00
100s/50s	0/0
Top score	37
Catches/stumpings	1/–
- Source: Cricinfo, 5 November 2010

Alan Mynett (born 5 August 1966) is a former English cricketer. Mynett was a right-handed batsman who played primarily as a wicket-keeper.

Mynett represented the Yorkshire Cricket Board in two List A matches against the Gloucestershire Cricket Board and Buckinghamshire in the 1999 NatWest Trophy. In his two List A matches, he scored 38 runs at a batting average of 19.00, with a high score of 37. In the field he took one catch.
