= Anthony McKenna =

English cricketer

Personal information
- Full name: Anthony Edward McKenna
- Born: 19 January 1969 (age 57); Lytham St Annes, Lancashire, England
- Batting: Right-handed
- Bowling: Right-arm medium

Domestic team information
- Years: Team
- 1999–2001: Yorkshire Cricket Board

Career statistics
Competition	LA
Matches	5
Runs scored	57
Batting average	11.40
100s/50s	–/–
Top score	43
Balls bowled	48
Wickets	1
Bowling average	35.00
5 wickets in innings	–
10 wickets in match	–
Best bowling	1/25
Catches/stumpings	1/–
- Source: Cricinfo, 5 November 2010

Anthony Edward McKenna (born 19 January 1969, Lytham St Annes, Lancashire) is an English former cricketer. McKennna was a right-handed batsman who bowled right-arm medium pace.

McKenna represented the Yorkshire Cricket Board in List A cricket. His debut List A match was against the Gloucestershire Cricket Board in the 1999 NatWest Trophy. From 1999 to 2001, he played four further List A matches for the Board, the last of which came against the Northamptonshire Cricket Board in the 2001 Cheltenham & Gloucester Trophy.

In his five List A matches, McKenna scored 57 runs at a batting average of 11.40, with a high score of 43. In the field, he took one catch. With the ball, he took one wicket at a bowling average of 35.00, with best figures of 1 for 25.
