= Christopher Brice =

English cricketer

Personal information
- Full name: Christopher Trevor Brice
- Born: 5 January 1983 (age 43); Leeds, Yorkshire, England
- Batting: Left-handed
- Bowling: Slow left-arm orthodox

Domestic team information
- Years: Team
- 2001–2002: Yorkshire Cricket Board

Career statistics
| Competition | LA |
|---|---|
| Matches | 3 |
| Runs scored | 27 |
| Batting average | 13.50 |
| 100s/50s | –/– |
| Top score | 17 |
| Balls bowled | 36 |
| Wickets | 174 |
| Bowling average | 2 |
| 5 wickets in innings | 77.00 |
| 10 wickets in match | – |
| Best bowling | 1/22 |
| Catches/stumpings | 1/– |
- Source: Cricinfo, 4 November 2010

Christopher Trevor Brice (born 5 January 1983) is an English cricketer. Brice is a left-handed batsman who bowls slow left-arm orthodox. He was born in Leeds, Yorkshire.

Brice represented the Yorkshire Cricket Board in 3 List A matches. These came against the Gloucestershire Cricket Board in the 2nd round of the 2002 Cheltenham & Gloucester Trophy which was held in 2001 and against Somerset in the 3rd round of the same competition which was held in 2002. His final List A match came against Northumberland in the 2nd round of the 2003 Cheltenham & Gloucester Trophy which was played in 2002. In his 3 List A matches, he scored 27 runs at a batting average of 13.50, with a high score of 17. In the field he took a single catch. With the ball he took 2 wickets at a bowling average of 77.00, with best figures of 1/22.
