= Mark Coombes =

English cricketer

Personal information
- Full name: Mark Andrew Coombes
- Born: 19 April 1978 (age 48); Bristol, England
- Batting: Left-handed
- Bowling: Left-arm medium

Domestic team information
- Years: Team
- 1999 & 2002: Gloucestershire Cricket Board

Career statistics
Competition	LA
Matches	2
Runs scored	97
Batting average	48.50
100s/50s	–/1
Top score	97
Balls bowled	–
Wickets	–
Bowling average	–
5 wickets in innings	–
10 wickets in match	–
Best bowling	–
Catches/stumpings	–/–
- Source: Cricinfo, 9 November 2010

Mark Andrew Coombes (born 19 April 1978) is a former English cricketer. Coombes was a left-handed batsman who bowled left-arm medium pace. He was born in Bristol.

Coombes represented the Gloucestershire Cricket Board 2 in List A cricket matches. The first of these came against the Yorkshire Cricket Board in the 1999 NatWest Trophy. His second and final List A match for the Board came in 2002, against the Surrey Cricket Board in the 1st round of the 2003 Cheltenham & Gloucester Trophy which was played in 2002. In his 2 List A matches, he scored 97 runs at a batting average of 48.50, with a single half century high score of 97.
