= Blabbermouth & Stickybeak =

1998 Australian movie

- Directed by: Julian Kemp
- Written by: Andrew Bethel; Jutta Goetze; Julian Kemp
- Produced by: Ann Darrouzet
- Starring: Mike Bishop; Sally Cooper
- Cinematography: Brendan Lavelle
- Edited by: Geoff Hogg
- Release date: 1998
- Country: Australia
- Language: English

Blabbermouth & Stickybeak is a 1998 Australian live-action film directed by Julian Kemp and starring Mike Bishop and Sally Cooper. It is based on the novel by Morris Gleitzman. The story tells about the young mute girl Rowena Batts who is coming to a new school and is trying to gain friends.

== Cast ==
- Helen Neville as Rowena Batts
- Mike Bishop as Kenny Batts
- Sally Cooper as Ms. Dunning
- Robin Cumming as Mr. Fowler
- Will Deumer as Mr. Peck
- Evelyn Krape as Mrs. Peck
- Kane McNally as Darryn Peck
- Dan Spielman as Mr Segal

== Awards ==
=== Won ===
- Australian Film Institute 1998:
  - AFI Award – Best Children's Television Drama: Ann Darrouzet
- International Emmy Awards 1998:
  - Emmy Award – Children and Young People: Julian Kemp
- Banff Television Festival 1999:
  - Banff Rockie Award – Best Children's Program

=== Nominated ===
- Australian Film Institute 1998:
  - AFI Award – Best Achievement in Direction in a Television Drama: Julian Kemp
