= Robert Jennings =

Robert Jennings may refer to:

- Robert Jennings (cricketer) (born 1977), English cricketer
- Robert Jennings (rugby league) (born 1996), Australian rugby league player
- Robert R. Jennings, president of Alabama Agricultural and Mechanical University and Lincoln University of Pennsylvania
- Robert Yewdall Jennings (1913–2004), British jurist
- Robert Jennings, writer and actor in Annoying Orange
- Robert Spears-Jennings (born 2004), American football player
