= Richard Howell (disambiguation) =

Richard Howell (1754–1802) was the third Governor of New Jersey.

Richard Howell may also refer to:

- Richard P. Howell (1831–1899), American carpenter, businessman, and politician
- Richard Howell (comics) (born 1955), American comic book creator
- Richard Howell (swimmer) (1903–1967), American freestyle swimmer
- Richard Howell (cricketer) (born 1982), English cricketer
- Richard Howell (basketball) (born 1990), American basketball player
- Richard Howell (MP), 16th-century Member of Parliament for Haverfordwest
