= Richard McCarthy (cricketer) =

Australian cricketer (born 1961)

Personal information
- Full name: Richard Charles Arthur Marum McCarthy
- Born: 21 December 1961 (age 64); Geelong, Victoria, Australia
- Batting: Right-handed
- Bowling: Right-arm fast-medium

Domestic team information
- Years: Team
- 2000: Yorkshire Cricket Board
- 1984/85-1989/90: Victoria

Career statistics
Competition	FC	LA
Matches	11	4
Runs scored	230	6
Batting average	19.16	2.00
100s/50s	–/1	–/–
Top score	61	5
Balls bowled	1,968	216
Wickets	23	4
Bowling average	45.47	43.00
5 wickets in innings	–	–
10 wickets in match	–	–
Best bowling	4/80	2/46
Catches/stumpings	5/–	–/–
- Source: Cricinfo, 4 November 2010

Richard Charles Arthur Marum McCarthy (born 21 December 1961, in Geelong, Victoria, Australia) is a former Australian cricketer. McCarthy was a right-handed batsman who bowled right-arm fast-medium.

McCarthy made his first-class debut for Victoria against Tasmania in the 1984–85 Sheffield Shield. From the 1984–85 season to the 1989–90 season, he represented Victoria in 11 first-class matches, the last of which came against Western Australia. In his eleven first-class matches, he scored 230 runs at a batting average of 19.16, with a single half century high score of 61. In the field he took five catches.

It was for Victoria that McCarthy made his debut in List A cricket against an England XI in 1985. He played one further List A match for the State against Queensland in 1989.

In 2000, he played his first List A match in eleven years for the Yorkshire Cricket Board against Huntingdonshire in the 2000 NatWest Trophy. He played one further match for the Board in the same competition against Yorkshire. In his four List A matches, he scored six runs at an average of 2.00, with a high score of five. With the ball he took four wickets at an average of 43.00, with best figures of 2 for 46.

== See also ==
- List of Victoria first-class cricketers
