= Roger Hudson =

Roger Hudson may refer to:

- Roger Hudson (cricketer) (born 1967), English cricketer
- Roger Hudson (sailor) (born 1978), South African sailor
