= Christopher Gott =

English cricketer

Personal information
- Full name: Christopher Stephen Gott
- Born: 5 August 1965 (age 61); Calverley, Yorkshire, England
- Batting: Right-handed
- Bowling: Right-arm medium-fast

Domestic team information
- Years: Team
- 1999: Yorkshire Cricket Board

Career statistics
Competition	LA
Matches	1
Runs scored	–
Batting average	–
100s/50s	–/–
Top score	–
Balls bowled	–
Wickets	–
Bowling average	–
5 wickets in innings	–
10 wickets in match	–
Best bowling	–
Catches/stumpings	–/–
- Source: Cricinfo, 5 November 2010

Christopher Stephen Gott (born 5 August 1965) is an English former cricketer. Gott was a right-handed batsman who bowled right-arm medium-fast. He was born in Calverley, Pudsey, Yorkshire.

Gott represented the Yorkshire Cricket Board in a single List A match against Gloucestershire Cricket Board in the 1999 NatWest Trophy. In his only List A match, he wasn't required to bat or bowl.
