= Gordon Edwards =

Gordon Edwards may refer to:

- Gordon Edwards (scientist) (born 1940), Canadian scientist and nuclear consultant
- Gordon Edwards (cricketer) (born 1947), British cricketer and engineer
- Gordon Cameron Edwards (1866–1946), Canadian politician
- J. Gordon Edwards (director) (1867–1925), American film director, producer and writer
- J. Gordon Edwards (entomologist) (1919–2004), American entomologist and mountaineer
- Gordon John Edwards (1947–2003), British musician (The Kinks, Pretty Things)
- Gordon Edwards (musician), American bassist, founder of Stuff

== See also ==
- Charles Gordon Edwards (1878–1931), American political figure
