= Christopher Siddall =

English cricketer (born 1979)

Personal information
- Full name: Christopher James Siddall
- Born: 11 December 1979 (age 46); Sheffield, Yorkshire, England
- Batting: Left-handed
- Bowling: Right-arm off break

Domestic team information
- Years: Team
- 2000: Yorkshire Cricket Board

Career statistics
Competition	LA
Matches	1
Runs scored	5
Batting average	5.00
100s/50s	–/–
Top score	5
Balls bowled	18
Wickets	–
Bowling average	–
5 wickets in innings	–
10 wickets in match	–
Best bowling	–
Catches/stumpings	–/–
- Source: Cricinfo, 4 November 2010

Christopher James Siddall (born 11 December 1979, Sheffield, Yorkshire, England) is an English cricketer. Siddall is a left-handed batsman who bowls right-arm off break.

Siddall represented the Yorkshire Cricket Board in a single List A match against Huntingdonshire in the second round of the 2000 NatWest Trophy. In his only List A match, he scored five runs.
