= Stuart Priscott =

English cricketer

Personal information
- Full name: Stuart Michael Priscott
- Born: 6 July 1971 (age 55); Bristol, England
- Batting: Left-handed
- Bowling: Slow left-arm orthodox

Domestic team information
- Years: Team
- 2002: Devon
- 2001: Gloucestershire Cricket Board
- 1992–1994: Wiltshire

Career statistics
Competition	LA
Matches	2
Runs scored	12
Batting average	6.00
100s/50s	–/–
Top score	7
Balls bowled	60
Wickets	2
Bowling average	12.00
5 wickets in innings	–
10 wickets in match	–
Best bowling	2/24
Catches/stumpings	1/–
- Source: Cricinfo, 8 November 2010

Stuart Michael Priscott (born 6 July 1971) is a former English cricketer. Priscott was a left-handed batsman who bowled slow left-arm orthodox. He was born in Bristol.

Priscott made his debut in County Cricket for Wiltshire, making his Minor Counties Championship debut for the county against Oxfordshire in 1992. From 1992 to 1994, he represented the county in 10 Championship matches, the last of which came against Dorset. It was in 1992 that he made his MCCA Knockout Trophy debut for Wiltshire against Devon. He played his second and final Trophy match for the county against the same opposition in 1994.

Priscott later represented the Gloucestershire Cricket Board in a single List A match against Huntingdonshire in the 1st round of the 2002 Cheltenham & Gloucester Trophy which was held in 2001. The following season he played a single List A match for Devon against Yorkshire in the 3rd round of the 2002 Cheltenham & Gloucester Trophy. In his 2 List A matches, he scored 12 runs at a batting average of 6.00, with a high score of 7. In the field he took a single catch. With the ball he took 2 wickets at a bowling average of 12.00, with a best figures of 2/24.
