= John Carruthers (cricketer) =

English cricketer

Personal information
- Full name: John Richard Carruthers
- Born: 13 April 1970 (age 56); Barnsley, Yorkshire, England
- Batting: Right-handed
- Bowling: Right-arm medium-fast

Domestic team information
- Years: Team
- 1999–2001: Yorkshire Cricket Board

Career statistics
Competition	LA
Matches	6
Runs scored	9
Batting average	3.00
100s/50s	–/–
Top score	9
Balls bowled	306
Wickets	8
Bowling average	22.75
5 wickets in innings	–
10 wickets in match	–
Best bowling	2/16
Catches/stumpings	1/–
- Source: Cricinfo, 5 November 2010

John Richard Carruthers (born 13 April 1970) is an English cricketer. Carruthers is a right-handed batsman who bowls right-arm medium-fast. He was born in Barnsley, Yorkshire.

Carruthers represented the Yorkshire Cricket Board in List A cricket. His debut List A match came against the Gloucestershire Cricket Board 1999 NatWest Trophy. From 1999 to 2001, he represented the Board in 6 List A matches, the last of which came against the Northamptonshire Cricket Board in the 2001 Cheltenham & Gloucester Trophy. In his 6 List A matches, he scored 9 runs at a batting average of 3.00, with a high score of 9. In the field he took a single catch. With the ball he took 8 wickets at a bowling average of 22.75, with best figures of 2/16.

He currently plays club cricket for Hanging Heaton Cricket Club.
