= Darren Harland =

English cricketer (born 1979)

Personal information
- Full name: Darren Simon Harland
- Born: 15 October 1979 (age 47); Whitby, Yorkshire, England
- Batting: Right-handed

Domestic team information
- Years: Team
- 2001–2002: Yorkshire Cricket Board

Career statistics
Competition	LA
Matches	4
Runs scored	38
Batting average	9.50
100s/50s	–/–
Top score	16
Balls bowled	–
Wickets	–
Bowling average	–
5 wickets in innings	–
10 wickets in match	–
Best bowling	–
Catches/stumpings	2/–
- Source: Cricinfo, 4 November 2010

Darren Simon Harland (born 15 October 1979, Whitby, Yorkshire, England) is an English cricketer. Harland is a right-handed batsman.

Harland represented the Yorkshire Cricket Board in List A cricket. His debut List A match came against the Gloucestershire Cricket Board in the second round of the 2002 Cheltenham & Gloucester Trophy which was held in 2001. From 2001 to 2002, he represented the Board in four List A matches, the last of which came against Northumberland in the second round of the 2003 Cheltenham & Gloucester Trophy which was played in 2002. In his four List A matches, he scored 38 runs at a batting average of 9.50, with a high score of 16. In the field he took two catches.

He currently plays club cricket for Scarborough, in the Yorkshire ECB County Premier League.
