= Lee Peacock (cricketer) =

English cricketer

Personal information
- Full name: Lee Robert Peacock
- Born: 18 January 1974 (age 52); Cambridge, Cambridgeshire, England
- Batting: Right-handed
- Bowling: Left-arm fast-medium

Domestic team information
- Years: Team
- 2001–2002: Huntingdonshire
- 1999: Lincolnshire

Career statistics
Competition	LA
Matches	5
Runs scored	16
Batting average	5.33
100s/50s	–/-
Top score	8
Balls bowled	246
Wickets	7
Bowling average	29.14
5 wickets in innings	–
10 wickets in match	–
Best bowling	3/65
Catches/stumpings	1/-
- Source: Cricinfo, 3 June 2010

Lee Robert Peacock (born 18 January 1974) is a former English cricketer. Peacock was a right-handed batsman who bowled left-arm fast-medium.

Peacock made his List-A debut for Lincolnshire in the 1999 NatWest Trophy against Wales Minor Counties. In August 1999, he played his only Minor Counties Championship fixture for Lincolnshire against Bedfordshire.

In 2001 he made his List-A debut for Huntingdonshire against Oxfordshire in the 1st round of the 2001 Cheltenham & Gloucester Trophy, playing one further match in that version of the competition against a Surrey Cricket Board side, which eliminated Huntingdonshire from the competition. Peacock played 2 further List-A matches for Huntingdonshire in the 1st round of the 2002 Cheltenham & Gloucester Trophy against a Gloucestershire Cricket Board side which was played in 2001 and in the 1st round of the 2003 Cheltenham & Gloucester Trophy against Cheshire, which was played in 2002.

In his 5 one-day matches, he scored 16 runs at a batting average of 5.33. With the ball he took 7 wickets at a bowling average of 29.14, with best figures of 3/65.
