= Tom Cotterell =

English cricketer

Thomas Paul Cotterell (born 9 March 1977) is an English cricketer who played as a left-handed tail-end batsman and a left-arm slow bowler. He played for Gloucestershire in 1999 and 2000. He also played one List A cricket match for Gloucestershire Cricket Board in 2000. He was born at Hounslow, Middlesex.

After his final first-class cricket appearances in 2000 he played in 2001 for Gloucestershire's Second XI before leaving Gloucestershire along with teammates Reggie Williams, Damian Forder and Michael Sutliff at the end of that season.

Cotterell's brother, Joseph, played Minor Counties cricket for Hertfordshire.
