= Chris Malton =

English cricketer

Personal information
- Full name: Christopher Jon Malton
- Born: 10 January 1969 (age 57); Peterborough, Cambridgeshire, England
- Batting: Right-handed
- Role: Wicketkeeper

Domestic team information
- Years: Team
- 2000–2005: Huntingdonshire
- 1993/4: Cambridgeshire

Career statistics
Competition	LA
Matches	5
Runs scored	128
Batting average	32.00
100s/50s	–/-
Top score	37
Balls bowled	–
Wickets	–
Bowling average	–
5 wickets in innings	–
10 wickets in match	–
Best bowling	–
Catches/stumpings	1/-
- Source: Cricinfo, 5 June 2010

Christopher John Malton (born 1 January 1969) is a former English cricketer. Malton was a right-handed batsman who played primarily as a wicketkeeper.

In 1993, Malton played 2 Minor Counties Championship matches for Cambridgeshire against Staffordshire and Suffolk.

Malton made his List-A debut for Huntingdonshire in the 2000 NatWest Trophy against a Hampshire Cricket Board side and also played against a Yorkshire Cricket Board in the 2nd round of the same competition. He played 3 further List-A matches for Huntingdonshire, against Oxfordshire in the 1st round of the 2001 Cheltenham & Gloucester Trophy and a further game against Surrey Cricket Board in the 2nd round of the same competition. His final List-A match for the county came against a Gloucestershire Cricket Board side in the 1st round of the 2002 Cheltenham & Gloucester Trophy, which Huntingdonshire lost.

In his 5 List-A matches, he scored 128 runs at a batting average of 32.00, with a high score of 37.
