= Richard Howell (cricketer) =

English cricketer

Personal information
- Full name: Richard Thomas James Howell
- Born: 2 January 1982 (age 44); Gloucester, Gloucestershire, England
- Batting: Right-handed
- Bowling: Right-arm medium
- Role: Occasional wicketkeeper

Domestic team information
- Years: Team
- 2000–2001: Gloucestershire Cricket Board

Career statistics
Competition	LA
Matches	3
Runs scored	35
Batting average	35.00
100s/50s	–/–
Top score	20*
Balls bowled	42
Wickets	1
Bowling average	35.00
5 wickets in innings	–
10 wickets in match	–
Best bowling	1/35
Catches/stumpings	–/–
- Source: Cricinfo, 8 November 2010

Richard Thomas James Howell (born 2 January 1982) is an English cricketer. Howell is a right-handed batsman who bowls right-arm medium pace and who occasionally plays as a wicketkeeper. He was born in Gloucester, Gloucestershire and was educated at Cheltenham College.

Howell represented the Gloucestershire Cricket Board in 3 List A matches. These came against the Nottinghamshire Cricket Board in the 2000 NatWest Trophy and Huntingdonshire and the Yorkshire Cricket Board in the 1st and 2nd rounds of the 2002 Cheltenham & Gloucester Trophy which were both held in 2002. In his 3 List A matches, he scored 35 runs at a batting average of 35.00, with a high score of 20*. With the ball he took a single wicket at a bowling average of 35.00, with best figures of 1/35.
