= Andrew Walker (cricketer) =

English cricketer (born 1971)

Personal information
- Full name: Andrew John Walker
- Born: 29 October 1971 (age 55); Bradford, Yorkshire, England
- Batting: Right-handed
- Bowling: Right-arm off break

Domestic team information
- Years: Team
- 1999–2000: Yorkshire Cricket Board

Career statistics
Competition	LA
Matches	3
Runs scored	57
Batting average	28.50
100s/50s	–/–
Top score	30*
Balls bowled	138
Wickets	–
Bowling average	–
5 wickets in innings	–
10 wickets in match	–
Best bowling	–
Catches/stumpings	–/–
- Source: Cricinfo, 5 November 2010

Andrew John Walker (born 29 October 1971, Bradford, Yorkshire, England) is a former English cricketer. Walker was a right-handed batsman, who bowled right-arm off break.

Walker represented the Yorkshire Cricket Board in three List A matches. His debut List A match came against the Gloucestershire Cricket Board in the 1999 NatWest Trophy. His final two matches came against Huntingdonshire and Yorkshire, both in the 2000 NatWest Trophy. In his three List A matches, he scored 57 runs at a batting average of 28.50, with a high score of 30*.
