= Berrill =

Berrill is a surname. Notable people with the surname include:

- Sir Kenneth Berrill (1920–2009), English economist and public servant
- Norman John Berrill (1903–1996), English marine biologist
- Paul Berrill (born 1964), English cricketer
- Roland Berrill (1896–1962), Australian co-founder of Mensa
