= Stephen Caple =

English cricketer

Personal information
- Full name: Stephen John Caple
- Born: 7 June 1984 (age 42); Hereford, Herefordshire, England
- Batting: Right-handed
- Role: Wicketkeeper

Domestic team information
- Years: Team
- 2008: Herefordshire
- 2002: Gloucestershire Cricket Board

Career statistics
Competition	LA
Matches	1
Runs scored	–
Batting average	–
100s/50s	–/–
Top score	–
Balls bowled	–
Wickets	–
Bowling average	–
5 wickets in innings	–
10 wickets in match	–
Best bowling	–
Catches/stumpings	–/–
- Source: Cricinfo, 8 November 2010

Stephen John Caple (born 7 June 1984) is an English cricketer. Caple is a right-handed batsman who plays primarily as a wicketkeeper. He was born in Hereford, Herefordshire.

Caple represented the Gloucestershire Cricket Board in a single List A match against the Surrey Cricket Board in the 1st round of the 2003 Cheltenham & Gloucester Trophy which was held in 2002. In 2008, he played a single MCCA Knockout Trophy match for Herefordshire against Wiltshire.
