= Paul Berrill =

English cricketer

Personal information
- Full name: Paul Francis Berrill
- Born: 17 December 1964 (age 61); Cambridge, Cambridgeshire, England
- Batting: Right-handed
- Bowling: Right-arm off break

Domestic team information
- Years: Team
- 2000: Huntingdonshire

Career statistics
Competition	LA
Matches	2
Runs scored	10
Batting average	5.00
100s/50s	–/-
Top score	10
Balls bowled	–
Wickets	–
Bowling average	–
5 wickets in innings	–
10 wickets in match	–
Best bowling	–
Catches/stumpings	–/-
- Source: Cricinfo, 1 June 2010

Paul Francis Berrill (born 17 December 1964) is a former English cricketer. Berrill was a right-handed batsman who bowled right-arm off break.

Berrill played 2 List-A matches for Huntingdonshire in the 2000 NatWest Trophy against a Hampshire Cricket Board side and a Yorkshire Cricket Board. In his 2 matches he scored just 10 runs.
