= Andy Stovold =

English cricketer

Personal information
- Full name: Andrew Willis Stovold
- Born: 19 March 1953 (age 73); Southmead, Bristol, England
- Batting: Right-handed
- Role: Opening batsman, wicketkeeper
- Relatives: Neil Stovold (son); Nicholas Stovold (son); Martin Stovold (brother)

Domestic team information
- Years: Team
- 1973–1990: Gloucestershire
- 1974/75–1975/76: Orange Free State

Career statistics
Competition	FC	LA
Matches	354	294
Runs scored	17,705	7,271
Batting average	29.75	28.73
100s/50s	20/97	4/36
Top score	212*	123
Balls bowled	309
Wickets	4
Bowling average	54.50
5 wickets in innings	0
10 wickets in match	0
Best bowling	1/0
Catches/stumpings	289/45	142/21
- Source: CricketArchive, 19 June 2012

Andrew Willis Stovold (born 19 March 1953) is a retired English cricketer. He was a right-handed batsman and wicketkeeper who represented Gloucestershire from 1973 to 1990. He also played in South Africa for Orange Free State in 1974–75 and 1975–76.

Stovold was man of the match in the final when Gloucestershire won the 1977 Benson & Hedges Cup, and also played when the county won the 1973 Gillette Cup. His highest first-class score was 212 not out against Northamptonshire in 1982. In the 1981 season he made 18 stumpings, more than anybody else in England.
