= Carl Bradfield =

South African cricketer

Personal information
- Full name: Carl Crispin Bradfield
- Born: 18 January 1975 (age 51); Grahamstown, Cape Province, South Africa
- Batting: Left-handed
- Bowling: Right-arm medium

Domestic team information
- Years: Team
- 1993/94–2003/04: Eastern Province
- 2001: Huntingdonshire
- 2003/04: Eastern Cape
- 2004/05–2005/06: Warriors
- 2004/05–2006/07: Border

Career statistics
Competition	FC	LA	T20
Matches	93	75	1
Runs scored	5,412	1,757	8
Batting average	33.20	24.74	8.00
100s/50s	9/29	1/7	0/0
Top score	196	109*	8
Balls bowled	49	66	–
Wickets	0	4	–
Bowling average	–	21.00	–
5 wickets in innings	–	0	–
10 wickets in match	–	0;	–
Best bowling	–	2/17	–
Catches/stumpings	64/–	18/–;	0/–
- Source: Cricinfo, 14 July 2010

Carl Crispin Bradfield (born 18 January 1975) is a South African former cricketer. Bradfield is a right-handed batsman who bowls right-arm medium pace.

In a career that lasted 14 seasons, he represented Eastern Cape, Border, Warriors, Huntingdonshire, Eastern Province and Eastern Province B.

Something of a journeyman within South Africa, Bradfield did play 3 List-A matches for Huntingdonshire in English county cricket, which was his only spell with an English county. In his 14-year career, he forged a successful, if inconsistent first-class career. He played 93 first-class matches, where he scored 5,412 runs at a batting average of 33.20, with 29 half centuries and 9 centuries. His highest score in first-class cricket was 196. In List-A cricket, he played a total of 75 matches, where he scored 1,757 runs at an average of 24.74. In the process, he made 9 half centuries and a single century high score of 109*. He also took 4 wickets in List-A cricket, at a bowling average of 21.00 apiece.

Toward the end of his career, Twenty20 cricket was introduced, with Bradfield playing a single match in the format for Eastern Cape against Western Province Boland.
