= Mark Turner (cricketer, born 1969) =

English cricketer

Personal information
- Full name: Mark Andrew Turner
- Born: 13 May 1969 (age 57); Blackpool, Lancashire, England
- Nickname: Bunsen Burner (Bowls Heat)
- Batting: Right-handed
- Bowling: Right-arm fast-medium

Domestic team information
- Years: Team
- 1999–2000: Huntingdonshire

Career statistics
Competition	LA
Matches	2
Runs scored	5
Batting average	5.00
100s/50s	–/ –
Top score	5
Balls bowled	84
Wickets	1
Bowling average	45.00
5 wickets in innings	–
10 wickets in match	–
Best bowling	1/20
Catches/stumpings	–/ –
- Source: Cricinfo, 31 May 2010

Mark Andrew Turner (born 15 May 1969) is a former English cricketer. Turner was a right-handed batsman who bowled right-arm fast-medium. Turner was born in Blackpool, Lancashire.

Turner made his List-A debut for Huntingdonshire against Bedfordshire in the 1st round of the 1999 NatWest Trophy. He played a further match for the county in the 2000 NatWest Trophy against a Hampshire Cricket Board side. In his 2 one-day matches, he scored 5 runs and took a single wicket.
