= Nathan Bressington =

English cricketer and rugby union footballer

Personal information
- Full name: Nathan Stewart Bressington
- Born: 7 February 1981 (age 45); Cheltenham, Gloucestershire, England
- Batting: Left-handed
- Bowling: Right-arm medium
- Relatives: Alastair Bressington (brother)

Domestic team information
- Years: Team
- 2000: Gloucestershire Cricket Board

Career statistics
Competition	LA
Matches	2
Runs scored	6
Batting average	6.00
100s/50s	0/0
Top score	6
Balls bowled	12
Wickets	0
Bowling average
5 wickets in innings
10 wickets in match
Best bowling
Catches/stumpings	0/–
- Source: Cricinfo, 24 June 2010

Nathan Bressington
Rugby union career
- Position: Wing
- Current team: Stourbridge
Senior career
Years	Team	Apps	(Points)
2003-04	Birmingham & Solihull	3	(0)
2003-04	Stourbridge	14	(85)
2004-11	Moseley	178	(415)
2011-	Stourbridge	91	(315)
- Correct as of 2 May 2015

Nathan Stewart Bressington (born 7 February 1981) is a rugby union player and former English cricketer. He currently plays for Stourbridge in the National League 2 North. Bressington played as a left-handed batsman and was a right-arm medium-pace bowler.

Bressington played two List-A matches for the Gloucestershire Cricket Board against the Nottinghamshire Cricket Board and the Derbyshire Cricket Board in the 2000 NatWest Trophy.

== Rugby career ==
Outside of cricket, Bressington played for rugby union for Stourbridge R.F.C., where he broke the club's record for most tries in a season, with 17 in just 14 games back in 2003-04 (this record has since been broken) and has scored tries consistently throughout his career with over 150 as of the 2014–15 season. He has spent most of his career between Moseley and his current club Stourbridge, with Mosley being where Nathan has had most success helping the club gain promotion to what is now the RFU Championship back in 2006 as well as winning the EDF Energy Trophy in 2009.

== Rugby honours ==
Moseley

- National Division Two league champions: 2005-06
- EDF Energy Trophy winners: 2009

== Family ==
Nathan's older brother Alastair Bressington played first-class and List-A cricket for Gloucestershire, as well as List-A cricket for the Gloucestershire Cricket Board, where he played in the same team as Nathan in both his List-A appearances for the board. Nathan is one of four children with a younger sister Lydia Bressington and younger brother Edward Bressington.
