= James Rendell =

English cricketer (born 1980)

Personal information
- Full name: James Phillip Rendell
- Born: 24 January 1980 (age 46); Bristol, England
- Batting: Right-handed
- Bowling: Right-arm off break

Domestic team information
- Years: Team
- 1999–2002: Gloucestershire Cricket Board

Career statistics
Competition	LA
Matches	4
Runs scored	7
Batting average	7.00
100s/50s	–/–
Top score	4*
Balls bowled	240
Wickets	7
Bowling average	20.85
5 wickets in innings	–
10 wickets in match	–
Best bowling	3/36
Catches/stumpings	–/–
- Source: Cricinfo, 9 November 2010

James Phillip Rendell (born 24 January 1980) is a former English cricketer. Rendell was a right-handed batsman who bowled right-arm off break. He was born in Bristol.

Rendell represented the Gloucestershire Cricket Board in List A cricket. His debut List A match came against the Yorkshire Cricket Board in the 1999 NatWest Trophy. From 1999 to 2002, he represented the Board in 4 List A matches, the last of which came against the Surrey Cricket Board in the 1st round of the 2003 Cheltenham & Gloucester Trophy which was played in 2002. In his 4 List A matches, he took 7 wickets at a bowling average of 20.85, with best figures of 3/36.
