= James Woodward (cricketer) =

English cricketer

Personal information
- Full name: James Ralph Woodward
- Born: 19 November 1963 (age 62); Peterborough, Cambridgeshire, England
- Batting: Right-handed

Domestic team information
- Years: Team
- 2000–2001: Huntingdonshire

Career statistics
Competition	LA
Matches	4
Runs scored	40
Batting average	10.00
100s/50s	–/-
Top score	30
Balls bowled	–
Wickets	–
Bowling average	–
5 wickets in innings	–
10 wickets in match	–
Best bowling	–
Catches/stumpings	–/-
- Source: Cricinfo, 1 June 2010

James Ralph Woodward (born 19 November 1963) is a former English cricketer. Woodward was a right-handed batsman.

Woodward made his List-A debut for Huntingdonshire in the 2000 NatWest Trophy against a Hampshire Cricket Board side. He played 2 further List-A matches for Huntingdonshire, against Oxfordshire in the 1st round of the 2001 Cheltenham & Gloucester Trophy and a further game against Surrey Cricket Board in the 2nd round of the same competition.

In his 4 List-A matches, he scored 40 runs at a batting average of 10, with a high score of 30.
