= Anthony Burton (Yorkshire cricketer) =

English cricketer

Personal information
- Full name: Anthony William Burton
- Born: 15 April 1975 (age 51); Ripon, Yorkshire, England
- Batting: Right-handed
- Bowling: Right-arm fast-medium

Domestic team information
- Years: Team
- 1999: Yorkshire Cricket Board

Career statistics
Competition	LA
Matches	1
Runs scored	2
Batting average	–
100s/50s	–/–
Top score	2*
Balls bowled	54
Wickets	3
Bowling average	10.00
5 wickets in innings	–
10 wickets in match	–
Best bowling	3/30
Catches/stumpings	–/–
- Source: Cricinfo, 5 November 2010

Anthony William Burton (born 15 April 1975) is a former English cricketer. Burton was a right-handed batsman who bowled right-arm fast-medium. He was born in Ripon, Yorkshire.

Burton represented the Yorkshire Cricket Board in a single List A match against the Gloucestershire Cricket Board in the 1999 NatWest Trophy. In his only List A match, he scored an unbeaten 2 runs, while with the ball he took 3 wickets at a bowling average of 10.00, ending with figures of 3/30.
