= David Gillett (cricketer) =

English cricketer

Personal information
- Full name: David Edward Gillett
- Born: 16 May 1969 (age 57); Peterborough, Cambridgeshire, England
- Batting: Left-handed
- Bowling: Right-arm medium

Domestic team information
- Years: Team
- 2001–2002: Huntingdonshire
- 1993–2000: Lincolnshire

Career statistics
Competition	LA
Matches	6
Runs scored	93
Batting average	18.60
100s/50s	–/-
Top score	46*
Balls bowled	7
Wickets	–
Bowling average	–
5 wickets in innings	–
10 wickets in match	–
Best bowling	–
Catches/stumpings	5/-
- Source: Cricinfo, 7 July 2010

David Edward Gillett (born 16 May 1969) is a former English cricketer. Gillett was a left-handed batsman who bowled right-arm medium pace. He was born at Peterborough, Cambridgeshire.

Gillett made his debut in county cricket in the 1993 Minor Counties Championship for Lincolnshire against Northumberland. From 1993 to 2000, he represented the county in 22 Minor Counties Championship matches and 8 MCCA Knockout Trophy matches.

In 1996 he made his List-A debut for Lincolnshire against Gloucestershire in the 1st round of the 1996 NatWest Trophy. His second and final List-A match for the county came against the Netherlands in the 2nd round of the 2000 NatWest Trophy, which Lincolnshire won by 95 runs.

In 2001, he made his debut for Huntingdonshire in the 1st round of the 2001 Cheltenham & Gloucester Trophy against Oxfordshire. He played 3 more List-A matches for the county, with his final appearance for Huntingdonshire coming in the 1st round of 2003 Cheltenham & Gloucester Trophy against Cheshire. In his 6 career List-A matches, he scored 93 runs at a batting average of 18.60 and a high score of 46*. In the field he took 5 catches.
