= Pieter Swanepoel =

South African cricketer (born 1977)

Pieter Johannes Swanepoel (born 30 March 1977 in Paarl, Cape Province, South Africa) is a South African first-class cricketer. who played two matches of first-class cricket for Yorkshire County Cricket Club in 2003 against Durham and India A. He also appeared in two Twenty20 matches, and three Pro40 matches for Yorkshire in 2003, after impressing for the Yorkshire Cricket Board in four Cheltenham & Gloucester Trophy matches in 2001 and 2002.

He scored 20 first-class runs, with a best of 17, for an average of 6.66, and took three wickets with his right arm medium pace. He was more successful in one day cricket, playing from 2001 to 2004 and taking fourteen wickets at 20.09, with a best return of 3 for 9, and scoring 73 runs at 24.33, with a top score of 28 not out.

He also played Minor Counties cricket for Cambridgeshire, turning out against Northamptonshire in 2004 in the Cheltenham & Gloucester Trophy. He played for Woodlands C.C. in League cricket, opening the bowling in the Priestley Cup final against Pudsey Congs C.C. in 2005.
