= Graham Williams (English cricketer) =

English cricketer

Personal information
- Full name: Graham Geoffrey Williams
- Born: 16 December 1985 (age 40); Bristol, England
- Batting: Right-handed
- Bowling: Right-arm medium

Domestic team information
- Years: Team
- 2002: Gloucestershire Cricket Board

Career statistics
Competition	LA
Matches	1
Runs scored	17
Batting average	17.00
100s/50s	–/–
Top score	17
Balls bowled	48
Wickets	–
Bowling average	–
5 wickets in innings	–
10 wickets in match	–
Best bowling	–
Catches/stumpings	–/–
- Source: Cricinfo, 24 June 2010

Graham Geoffrey Williams (born 16 December 1985) is an English cricketer who played as a right-handed batsman and was a right-arm medium-pace bowler. He was born in Bristol.

Williams played a single List-A match for the Gloucestershire Cricket Board against the Surrey Cricket Board in the 2002 Cheltenham & Gloucester Trophy. He also played second eleven cricket for Gloucestershire but did not make any first-class cricket appearances.
