= Neil Stovold =

English cricketer

Personal information
- Full name: Neil Andrew Stovold
- Born: 24 March 1983 (age 43); Bristol, England
- Batting: Right-handed
- Bowling: Right-arm off break
- Relatives: Andy Stovold (father), Nicholas Stovold (brother), Martin Stovold (uncle)

Domestic team information
- Years: Team
- 2001–2002: Gloucestershire Cricket Board

Career statistics
Competition	LA
Matches	3
Runs scored	111
Batting average	37.00
100s/50s	–/1
Top score	75
Balls bowled	48
Wickets	1
Bowling average	58.00
5 wickets in innings	–
10 wickets in match	–
Best bowling	1/33
Catches/stumpings	–/–
- Source: Cricinfo, 8 November 2010

Neil Andrew Stovold (born 24 February 1983) is an English cricketer. Stovold is a right-handed batsman who bowls right-arm off break. He was born in Bristol.

Stovold represented the Gloucestershire Cricket Board in 3 List A matches. These came against Herefordshire in the 2nd round of the 2001 Cheltenham & Gloucester Trophy, Huntingdonshire in the 1st round of the 2002 Cheltenham & Gloucester Trophy which was held in 2001, and the Surrey Cricket Board in the 1st round of the 2003 Cheltenham & Gloucester Trophy which was played in 2002. In his 3 List A matches, he scored 111 runs at a batting average of 37.00, with a single half century high score of 75. With the ball he took a single wicket at a bowling average of 58.00, with best figures of 1/33.

== Family ==
His father, Andy, played first-class cricket for Gloucestershire, Orange Free State and the Marylebone Cricket Club. His uncle, Martin, played first-class cricket for Gloucestershire. His brother, Nicholas, also played List A cricket for the Gloucestershire Cricket Board.
