= Jason Coleman =

Australian born cricketer

Personal information
- Born: 21 August 1974 (age 52); Sydney, New South Wales, Australia
- Height: 5 ft 10 in (1.78 m)
- Batting: Right-handed
- Bowling: Right-arm medium–fast

Domestic team information
- Years: Team
- 2002: Huntingdonshire
- 2003–2004: Cambridgeshire

Career statistics
Competition	List A
Matches	3
Runs scored	46
Batting average	46.00
100s/50s	0/0
Top score	26
Balls bowled	180
Wickets	3
Bowling average	35.33
5 wickets in innings	0
10 wickets in match	0
Best bowling	1/26
Catches/stumpings	0/–
- Source: Cricinfo, 8 July 2010

Jason Coleman (born 21 August 1974) is an Australian-born cricketer. Coleman is a right-handed batsman who bowls right-arm medium pace. He was born at Sydney, New South Wales.

Coleman made his List A debut for Huntingdonshire against Oxfordshire 2001 Cheltenham & Gloucester Trophy. He played two further List A matches for the county. These were against the Surrey Cricket Board in the same competition and the 1st round of the 2002 Cheltenham & Gloucester Trophy which was played in 2001. In his three List A matches, he scored 46 runs at a batting average of 46 and a high score of 26. With the ball he took 3 wickets at a bowling average of 35.33, with best figures of 1/26.

In 2003, Coleman joined Cambridgeshire, where he made his Minor Counties Championship debut for the county against Cumberland. From 2003 to 2014, he represented the county in six Minor Counties Championship matches and five MCCA Knockout Trophy matches.
