= Danny Wilson (cricketer) =

English cricketer

Personal information
- Full name: Daniel Graeme Wilson
- Born: 18 February 1977 (age 49); Paddington, London, England
- Batting: Right-handed
- Bowling: Right-arm medium

Domestic team information
- Years: Team
- 2002: Huntingdonshire
- 1999–2001: Cambridgeshire
- 1996–1998: Essex

Career statistics
| Competition | FC | LA |
|---|---|---|
| Matches | 3 | 12 |
| Runs scored | 31 | 165 |
| Batting average | 15.50 | 27.50 |
| 100s/50s | –/– | –/1 |
| Top score | 14* | 52* |
| Balls bowled | 243 | 306 |
| Wickets | 4 | 12 |
| Bowling average | 45.25 | 26.33 |
| 5 wickets in innings | – | – |
| 10 wickets in match | – | – |
| Best bowling | 1/22 | 3/30 |
| Catches/stumpings | 1/– | 4/– |
- Source: Cricinfo, 16 March 2010

Daniel 'Danny' Graeme Wilson (born 18 February 1977) is a former English cricketer. Wilson was a right-handed batsman who bowled right-arm medium pace.

Wilson made his debut for Essex in a List-A match against South Africa A in 1996. Wilson would go on to make a further 5 List-A appearances for Essex, with his final List-A match for the county coming against the touring South Africans in 1998.

In 1997 Wilson made his first-class debut for Essex against Cambridge University. Wilson made two further first-class appearances for the county in 1998 against Durham, in his only County Championship match and against the touring South Africans.

In 1999 Wilson made his debut for Cambridgeshire in the 1999 Minor Counties Championship against Lincolnshire. From 1999 to 2001 Wilson played 19 Minor Counties matches for Cambridgeshire, with his final Minor Counties match for the county coming against Northumberland.

Wilson made his List-A debut for Cambridgeshire in the 2000 NatWest Trophy 1st round against Hertfordshire. Wilson played 5 List-A matches for Cambridgeshire from 2000 to 2001, with his final List-A match for Cambridgeshire coming against the Warwickshire Cricket Board in the 2nd round of the 2002 Cheltenham & Gloucester Trophy, which was played in 2001.

In 2002 Wilson made a single List-A appearance for Huntingdonshire against Cheshire, in the 1st round of the 2003 Cheltenham & Gloucester Trophy which was played in 2002. This was Wilson's final List-A match.
