= Mark Guest =

English cricketer

Personal information
- Full name: Mark Peter Guest
- Born: 4 December 1983 (age 42); Gloucester, Gloucestershire, England
- Batting: Right-handed
- Role: Wicketkeeper

Domestic team information
- Years: Team
- 2002: Gloucestershire Cricket Board

Career statistics
Competition	LA
Matches	1
Runs scored	29
Batting average	–
100s/50s	–/–
Top score	29*
Balls bowled	–
Wickets	–
Bowling average	–
5 wickets in innings	–
10 wickets in match	–
Best bowling	–
Catches/stumpings	1/1
- Source: Cricinfo, 8 November 2010

Mark Peter Guest (born 4 December 1983) is an English cricketer. Guest is a right-handed batsman who played primarily as a wicketkeeper. He was born at Gloucester, Gloucestershire.

Guest represented the Gloucestershire Cricket Board in a single List A match against the Surrey Cricket Board in the 1st round of the 2003 Cheltenham & Gloucester Trophy which was played in 2002 at the County Ground, Bristol. In his only List A match, he scored an unbeaten 29 runs and behind the stumps he took a single catch and made a single stumping.

He currently plays club cricket for Sutton Coldfield Cricket Club.
