= Greg Lambert (cricketer) =

English cricketer

Personal information
- Full name: Greg Andrew Lambert
- Born: 4 January 1980 (age 46); Stoke-on-Trent, Staffordshire, England
- Batting: Right-handed
- Bowling: Right-arm medium

Domestic team information
- Years: Team
- 2000: Yorkshire
- 1999: Yorkshire Cricket Board

Career statistics
Competition	FC	LA
Matches	2	1
Runs scored	6	0
Batting average	6.00	0.00
100s/50s	–/–	–/–
Top score	3*	0
Balls bowled	276	18
Wickets	4	2
Bowling average	33.25	11.00
5 wickets in innings	–	–
10 wickets in match	–	–
Best bowling	2/62	2/22
Catches/stumpings	1/–	–/–
- Source: Cricinfo, 4 November 2010

Greg Andrew Lambert (born 4 January 1980, Stoke-on-Trent, Staffordshire, England) is an English first-class cricketer. Lambert is a right-handed batsman who bowled right-arm medium pace.

Lambert represented the Yorkshire Cricket Board in a single List A match against Buckinghamshire in the 1999 NatWest Trophy. In his only List A match, he took 2 wickets at a bowling average of 11.00, with figures of 2/22.

In 2000, played two first-class matches for Yorkshire against Surrey and Kent in the County Championship. In those matches, he scored six runs at a batting average of 6.00, with a high score of 3*. In the field he took a single catch. With the ball he took four wickets at a bowling average of 33.25, with best figures of 2 for 62.
