= Simon Cowley (cricketer) =

English cricketer

Personal information
- Full name: Simon Thomas John Cowley
- Born: 8 November 1979 (age 47); Welwyn Garden City, Hertfordshire, England
- Batting: Right-handed
- Bowling: Right-arm off break

Domestic team information
- Years: Team
- 2000: Gloucestershire Cricket Board
- 1999: Herefordshire

Career statistics
Competition	LA
Matches	1
Runs scored	8
Batting average	8.00
100s/50s	–/–
Top score	8
Balls bowled	–
Wickets	–
Bowling average	–
5 wickets in innings	–
10 wickets in match	–
Best bowling	–
Catches/stumpings	–/–
- Source: Cricinfo, 8 November 2010

Simon Thomas John Cowley (born 8 November 1979) is a former English cricketer. Cowley was a right-handed batsman who bowled right-arm off break. He was born at Welwyn Garden City, Hertfordshire.

Cowley played a single Minor Counties Championship match in 1999 for Herefordshire against Oxfordshire.

In 2000, he represented the Gloucestershire Cricket Board in a single List A match against the Derbyshire Cricket Board in the 2000 NatWest Trophy at the Town Ground, Heanor. In his only List A match, he scored 8 runs.
