= Damian Forder =

English cricketer (born 1979)

Damian Forder (born 11 March 1979) is an English cricketer. He is a right-handed batsman and a left-handed medium-pace bowler. At 6 foot 4 inches tall, he was lined up to replace Mike Smith after the Gloucestershire man retired.

However, the young bowler was unable to secure a place in the Gloucestershire side in 1999, and left inauspiciously two years later, along with Mike Cawdron, Tom Cotterell and Michael Sutliff.
