= Robert Jennings (cricketer) =

English cricketer

Personal information
- Full name: Robert Alan Jennings
- Born: 28 February 1977 (age 49); Bristol, England
- Batting: Right-handed
- Role: Wicketkeeper

Career statistics
Competition	LA
Matches	1
Runs scored	12
Batting average	–
100s/50s	–/–
Top score	12*
Balls bowled	–
Wickets	–
Bowling average	–
5 wickets in innings	–
10 wickets in match	–
Best bowling	–
Catches/stumpings	1/–
- Source: Cricinfo, 8 November 2010

Robert Alan Jennings (born 28 February 1977) is a former English cricketer. Jennings was a right-handed batsman who played primarily as a wicketkeeper. He was born in Bristol.

Jennings represented the Gloucestershire Cricket Board in a single List A match against Huntingdonshire in the 1st round of the 2002 Cheltenham & Gloucester Trophy which was held in 2001. In his only List A match, he scored an unbeaten 12 runs and took a single catch behind the stumps.
