= Andrew Bethel =

English cricketer

Personal information
- Full name: Andrew John Bethel
- Born: 18 July 1967 (age 59); Sheffield, Yorkshire, England
- Batting: Left-handed
- Bowling: Right-arm off break

Domestic team information
- Years: Team
- 1999–2002: Yorkshire Cricket Board

Career statistics
Competition	LA
Matches	10
Runs scored	143
Batting average	14.30
100s/50s	–/–
Top score	38
Balls bowled	–
Wickets	–
Bowling average	–
5 wickets in innings	–
10 wickets in match	–
Best bowling	–
Catches/stumpings	2/–
- Source: Cricinfo, 5 November 2010

Andrew John Bethel (born 18 July 1967) is an English cricketer. Bethel is a left-handed batsman who bowls right-arm off break. He was born in Sheffield, Yorkshire.

Bethel represented the Yorkshire Cricket Board in List A cricket. His debut List A match came against the Gloucestershire Cricket Board in the 1999 NatWest Trophy. From 1999 to 2002, he represented the Board in 10 List A matches, the last of which came against Northumberland in the 2nd round of the 2003 Cheltenham & Gloucester Trophy which was played in 2002. In his 10 List A matches, he scored 143 runs at a batting average of 14.30, with a high score of 38. In the field he took 2 catches.

He currently plays club cricket for Whitley Hall Cricket Club.
