= Julian Kemp =

Director of television and film

- Education: Royal Academy of Dramatic Art
- Occupation: Director
- Years active: 1987 - present
- Known for: Director
- Website: http://www.juliankemp.com

Julian Kemp is a director of television and film.

== Early life ==
Kemp was an early member of the Central Junior Television Workshop, as Julian Aubrey, at thirteen years old. Kemp graduated from the Royal Academy of Dramatic Art.

== Career ==
Kemp has directed films, television drama, television documentary, television animation, and television commercials. Kemp has written series and stand-alone dramas. His work includes Last Train To Christmas, a Sky Original feature film starring Micheal Sheen, Nathalie Emmanuel and Cary Elwes.

== Awards ==
Kemp has won BAFTA Awards for his work on Roger and the Rottentrolls and Wise Up.

== Filmography ==
Year	Title	Production	Notes
1987	Hardwicke House	ITV	As Julian Aubrey
1998	Blabbermouth & Stickybeak	Double Exposure	Feature Film
1996 - 2000	Roger and the Rottentrolls	ITV	TV Series
2000	House!	Wire Films	Feature Film
2002 - 2003	Fimbles (Title Sequence)	BBC	TV Series
2003	Dangerville	Sky	TV Series
2007	Sherlock Holmes and the Baker Street Irregulars	BBC	TV Movie
2009	My Last Five Girlfriends	Willing Pillowsky Productions, Paramount Pictures	Feature Film
2010 - 2011	The Legend of Dick and Dom	BBC	TV Series
2011	Brian May's Brief History of 3D	Sky	Documentary
2015	Cinemaniacs	BBC	TV Series
2016 - 2018	Diddy TV	BBC	TV Series
2017 - 2020	Jamie Johnson	BBC	TV Series
2021	Last Train to Christmas	Sky	Feature Film
2024	The Primrose Railway Children	BBC	TV Series

- Hardwicke House, 1987 (as Julian Aubrey)
- Blabbermouth & Stickybeak
- House!
- Last Train to Christmas
- My Last Five Girlfriends
- Roger and the Rottentrolls
- Fimbles (title sequence)
- Sherlock Holmes and the Baker Street Irregulars

== Trivia ==
Kemp is a fan of technology and owns one of the last collections of laser discs in the UK.
