= Gary Ramsden =

English cricketer (born 1983)

Gary Ramsden (born 2 March 1983, Dewsbury, Yorkshire) is an English first-class cricketer, who played in one first-class match, and one one day match, for Yorkshire County Cricket Club in 2000. He played another one day match for the Yorkshire Cricket Board in 2002.

He took one wicket for 68 against Derbyshire in the County Championship match at the County Ground, Derby. He took 2 for 26 for Yorkshire against Gloucestershire, and 11 for 25 for the Yorkshire Cricket Board against Somerset.

He also appeared for the Yorkshire Second XI from 2000 to 2002, the Essex Second XI in 2002, and the Derbyshire Second XI in 2003.
