= Adrian Cade =

English cricketer (born 1961)

Personal information
- Full name: Adrian Mark Cade
- Born: 23 September 1961 (age 65); Peterborough, Cambridgeshire, England
- Batting: Right-handed
- Bowling: Right-arm medium
- Relatives: Jon Cade (nephew)

Domestic team information
- Years: Team
- 1999: Huntingdonshire
- 1990–1992: Cambridgeshire

Career statistics
Competition	LA
Matches	3
Runs scored	23
Batting average	11.50
100s/50s	–/-
Top score	18
Balls bowled	–
Wickets	–
Bowling average	–
5 wickets in innings	–
10 wickets in match	–
Best bowling	–
Catches/stumpings	–/-
- Source: CricketArchive, 9 July 2010

Adrian Mark Cade (born 23 September 1961) is a former English cricketer. Cade was a right-handed batsman who bowled right-arm medium pace. He was born at Peterborough, Cambridgeshire.

Cade made his debut in county cricket in the 1990 Minor Counties Championship for Cambridgeshire against Suffolk. From 1990 to 1992, he represented the county in 17 Minor Counties Championship matches.

In 1991 he made his List-A debut for Cambridgeshire against Kent in the 1st round of the 1991 NatWest Trophy. His second and final List-A match for the county came against Northamptonshire in the 1st round of the 1992 NatWest Trophy.

In the 1999 NatWest Trophy, he played a single List-A for Huntingdonshire against Bedfordshire. In his 3 career List-A matches, he scored 23 runs at a batting average of 11.50 and a high score of 18*.

== Family ==
His nephew Jon Cade made a single List-A appearance for Huntingdonshire in 2001.
