= Michael Kay (cricketer) =

English cricketer

Personal information
- Full name: Michael John Kay
- Born: 30 October 1981 (age 45); Bristol, England
- Batting: Left-handed
- Bowling: Right-arm medium

Domestic team information
- Years: Team
- 2006–2007: Cambridgeshire
- 2001–2002: Huntingdonshire

Career statistics
Competition	LA
Matches	3
Runs scored	38
Batting average	38.00
100s/50s	–/-
Top score	28*
Balls bowled	96
Wickets
Bowling average
5 wickets in innings	–
10 wickets in match	–
Best bowling
Catches/stumpings	1/ –
- Source: CricketArchive, 25 June 2010

Michael John Kay (born 30 October 1981) is a former English cricketer.

Kay made his List-A debut for Huntingdonshire against Oxfordshire in the first round of the 2001 Cheltenham & Gloucester Trophy. He played a further match in the same competition against the Surrey Cricket Board. His third and final List-A match for Huntingdonshire came against Cheshire in the 2002 Cheltenham & Gloucester Trophy.

Kay also played two Minor Counties Championship matches against Staffordshire in 2006 and Northumberland in 2007.
