= Jackson Thompson =

Indian cricketer

Personal information
- Full name: Jackson Gladwin Thompson
- Born: 7 February 1986 (age 40); Nasik, Maharashtra, India
- Batting: Left-handed
- Bowling: Right-arm off break

Domestic team information
- Years: Team
- 2002: Gloucestershire Cricket Board
- 2007: Oxfordshire
- 2007: Gloucestershire
- 2010: Middlesex
- 2010–2011: Unicorns (squad no. 22)

Career statistics
Competition	FC	LA	T20
Matches	1	17	6
Runs scored	32	327	68
Batting average	16.00	20.43	11.33
100s/50s	0/0	0/1	0/0
Top score	21	54	32
Catches/stumpings	0/–	3/–	3/–
- Source: CricketArchive, 21 May 2010

Jackson Gladwin Thompson (born 7 February 1986) is an Indian born former cricketer who has represented Oman at under-17 level. He played as a left-handed batsman and a right-arm offbreak bowler in English county cricket.

Thompson made his first-class debut for the team in a County Championship match against Middlesex - though the match finished in an innings defeat for the Gloucestershire team. Thompson contributed 11 runs in the first-innings and 21 runs in the second-innings to the Gloucestershire total. Thompson made his Twenty20 debut in the 2008 competition. In 2010, Thompson was selected as one of 21 players to form the first Unicorns squad to take part in the Clydesdale Bank 40 domestic limited overs competition against the regular first-class counties. The Unicorns were made up of 15 former county cricket professionals and 6 young cricketers looking to make it in the professional game.
