= Paul Swannell =

English cricketer

Personal information
- Full name: Paul Aaron Swannell
- Born: 6 July 1980 (age 46); Cambridge, Cambridgeshire, England
- Batting: Right-handed
- Bowling: Right-arm off break

Domestic team information
- Years: Team
- 2003–2006: Cambridgeshire
- 1999–2002: Huntingdonshire

Career statistics
Competition	LA
Matches	3
Runs scored	22
Batting average	7.33
100s/50s	–/-
Top score	12
Balls bowled	120
Wickets	1
Bowling average	110.00
5 wickets in innings	–
10 wickets in match	–
Best bowling	1/28
Catches/stumpings	–/-
- Source: Cricinfo, 2 June 2010

Paul Aaron Swannell (born 6 July 1980) is a former English cricketer. Swannell was a right-handed batsman who bowled right-arm off break.

Swannell made his List-A debut for Huntingdonshire in the 1999 NatWest Trophy against Bedfordshire. He played one further match for Huntingdonshire in the 1st round of the 2003 Cheltenham & Gloucester Trophy which was played in 2002 against Cheshire.

In 2003 he joined Cambridgeshire, where he made his debut for the county in the 2003 Minor Counties Championship against Suffolk. Swannell played 23 Minor Counties Championship matches for Cambridgeshire from 2003 to 2006. In 2004 he represented Cambridgeshire in the 2004 Cheltenham & Gloucester Trophy against Northamptonshire, which was his only List-A match for the county.

In his 3 one-day matches, he scored 22 runs at a batting average of 7.33. With the ball he took a single wicket at a bowling average of 110.00.
