= Danny Chard =

English cricketer

Daniel Martin Chard (born 1 June 1980) is a former English cricketer. He was a right-handed batsman and right-arm medium-pace bowler. He was born in Bristol.

Chard made his List A debut for Gloucestershire Cricket Board during the 2001 season, having made two appearances for the team in the 38-County Cup earlier in the season. However, he did not bat in the match. He made his second and final List A appearance exactly a year later, for Wiltshire. He scored 7 not out and took figures of 2-36 from 10 overs.
