= Andy Wright =

Andy Wright may refer to:

- Andy Wright, one of the Scottsboro Boys
- Andy Wright (footballer) (born 1978), English association football player
- Andy Wright (music producer) (born 1962), English music producer and songwriter
- Andy Wright (sound engineer) (21st Century), Australian supervising sound editor

== See also ==
- Andrew Wright (disambiguation)
