= Lesroy Weekes =

West Indian cricketer (born 1971)

Lesroy Charlesworth Weekes (born 19 July 1971) in Montserrat, Lesser Antilles, West Indies) is a former first-class cricketer.

Weekes was a fast bowler who made appearances for the Leeward Islands, Lincolnshire, Northamptonshire for 3 years, Yorkshire for 2 years and the Yorkshire Cricket Board, taking one hundred sixty nine first-class wickets at an average of 27.11, and scoring 4 runs at 17.83, in a fitful career which spanned the 1990s. He also played in twenty eight List A one day games, taking a wicket at 40.14.

Since retiring from first-class cricket, Weekes became one of the more successful league cricketers in the North of England. In one season for the Yorkshire League Club, Rotherham Town C.C., he amassed over 90 wickets and scored 500 runs. Weekes also played for Elsecar C.C. and currently plays at Eckington C.C.

Other than continuing to play cricket, Weekes has become the Head of Cricket at Mount St. Marys College until its closure in 2025
