= Dan Broadbent =

English cricketer

Personal information
- Full name: Daniel Louis Broadbent
- Born: 22 January 1985 (age 41); Leeds, Yorkshire, England
- Batting: Left-handed
- Bowling: Right-arm off break

Domestic team information
- Years: Team
- 2002: Yorkshire Cricket Board

Career statistics
Competition	LA
Matches	1
Runs scored	17
Batting average	–
100s/50s	–/–
Top score	17*
Balls bowled	36
Wickets	–
Bowling average	–
5 wickets in innings	–
10 wickets in match	–
Best bowling	–
Catches/stumpings	–/–
- Source: Cricinfo, 3 November 2010

Daniel Louis Broadbent (born 22 January 1985) is an English cricketer. Broadbent is a left-handed batsman who bowls right-arm off break. He was born in Leeds, Yorkshire.

Broadbent represented the Yorkshire Cricket Board in a single List A match against the Northamptonshire Cricket Board in the 1st round of the 2003 Cheltenham & Gloucester Trophy which was held in 2002. In his only List A match, he scored an unbeaten 17 runs.
