= Andy Walker =

Andy Walker is the name of:

- Andy Walker (basketball) (born 1955), American basketball player
- Andy Walker (football manager), Middlesbrough F.C. manager from June 1910 to January 1911
- Andy Walker (footballer, born 1891) (1891–1964), Dundee and Chelsea player
- Andy Walker (footballer, born 1965), Scottish footballer and TV pundit
- Andy Walker (footballer, born 1981), English footballer for Maidstone United
- Andy Walker (journalist) (born 1967), Canadian TV presenter and journalist

== See also ==
- Andrew Walker (disambiguation)
- Walker (surname)
