= Ben Staunton =

English cricketer

Personal information
- Full name: Ben Richard Frank Staunton
- Born: 9 January 1977 (age 49); Bath, Somerset, England
- Batting: Right-handed
- Bowling: Right-arm off break

Domestic team information
- Years: Team
- 2001–2002: Gloucestershire Cricket Board

Career statistics
| Competition | LA |
|---|---|
| Matches | 4 |
| Runs scored | 106 |
| Batting average | 26.50 |
| 100s/50s | –/1 |
| Top score | 56 |
| Balls bowled | 60 |
| Wickets | 1 |
| Bowling average | 54.00 |
| 5 wickets in innings | – |
| 10 wickets in match | – |
| Best bowling | 1/54 |
| Catches/stumpings | 3/– |
- Source: Cricinfo, 8 November 2010

Ben Richard Frank Staunton (born 9 January 1977) is an English cricketer. Staunton is a right-handed batsman who bowls right-arm off break. He was born in Bath, Somerset.

Staunton represented the Gloucestershire Cricket Board in List A cricket. His debut List A match came against Herefordshire in the 2nd round of the 2001 Cheltenham & Gloucester Trophy. From 2001 to 2002, he represented the Board in 4 List A matches, the last of which came against Surrey Cricket Board in the 1st round of the 2003 Cheltenham & Gloucester Trophy which was played in 2002. In his 4 List A matches, he scored 106 runs at a batting average of 26.50, with a single half century high score of 56. In the field he took 3 catches. With the ball he took a single wicket at a bowling average of 54.00, with best figures of 1/54.

He currently plays club cricket for Bath Cricket Club in the West of England Premier League where he thought he was the winner of the ‘biggest nose in the league’ but was beaten by Simon Marchant who took the award for 9 straight years.
