= Gary Sandford =

English cricketer

Personal information
- Full name: Gary Don Sandford
- Born: 7 July 1964 (age 62); Stevenage, Hertfordshire
- Batting: Right-handed
- Role: Wicket-keeper

Domestic team information
- Years: Team
- 1990–2000: Bedfordshire
- 2001–2002: Huntingdonshire

Career statistics
Competition	LA
Matches	12
Runs scored	80
Batting average	11.42
100s/50s	0/0
Top score	26
Catches/stumpings	5/10
- Source: Cricinfo, 17 December 2010

Gary Don Sandford (born 7 July 1964) is a former English cricketer. Sandford was a right-handed batsman who played primarily as a wicketkeeper.

Sandford made his Minor Counties Championship debut for Bedfordshire against Lincolnshire in 1990. From 1990 to 2000, he represented the county in 66 Championship matches, the last of which came against Staffordshire. His MCCA Knockout Trophy debut for the county came against Hertfordshire in 1990. From 1990 to 2000, he represented Bedfordshire in 28 Trophy matches, the last of which came against the Leicestershire Cricket Board.

It was for Bedfordshire that Sandford made his debut in List A cricket against Worcestershire in the 1991 NatWest Trophy. From 1991 to 2000, he represented the county in 8 List A matches, the last of which came against Northumberland. After leaving Bedfordshire at the end of the 2000 season, he joined Huntingdonshire. Sandford made his List A debut for the county in the 2001 Cheltenham & Gloucester Trophy against Oxfordshire. He represented the county in 3 more List A matches from 2001 to 2002, the last of which came against Cheshire in the 1st round of the 2003 Cheltenham & Gloucester Trophy which was held in 2002. In his total of 12 List A matches, he scored 80 runs at a batting average of 11.42, with a high score of 26. Behind the stumps he took 5 catches and made 10 stumpings.
