= Anthony Burton (Kent cricketer) =

English cricketer (1785–1850)

Personal information
- Full name: Anthony Frederick Augustus Burton
- Born: 1785
- Died: 5 September 1850 (aged 64–65); Wimbledon, Surrey
- Role: Wicket-keeper

Domestic team information
- Years: Team
- 1822: Kent
- FC debut: 15 July 1822 Kent v Marylebone Cricket Club (MCC)
- Last FC: 25 July 1822 Kent v MCC

Anthony Frederick Augustus Burton (1785 – 5 September 1850) was an English cricketer who played for Kent during the 1820s.

Burton was born in 1785 and worked as a maltster at Westerham in Kent. He played village cricket for the Westerham team and is known to have played for a variety of other teams in west Kent, including Leigh. A wicket-keeper, he played in two matches for Kent in 1822, both against the Marylebone Cricket Club. In the first match at Lord's Burton scored 21 runs as Kent won by an innings. In the second, played at Chislehurst on the West Kent ground, he made scores of four and 17 runs. In the two matches he claimed five wicket-keeping victims, with three catches and two stumpings.

During the same year Burton played for West Kent at Chevening, and in 1826 and 1827 he played for the Players of Kent against the Gentlemen of Kent. He died at Wimbledon in 1850, leaving property to his wife Sarah.

== Bibliography ==
- Carlaw, Derek (2020). Kent County Cricketers, A to Z: Part One (1806–1914) (PDF). Cardiff: ACS.
- Haygarth, Arthur (1996) [1862]. Scores & Biographies, Volume 1 (1744–1826). Kennington: Frederick Lillywhite. ISBN 978-19-00592-23-9.
- Haygarth, Arthur (1997) [1862]. Scores & Biographies, Volume 2 (1827–1840). Kennington: Frederick Lillywhite. ISBN 978-19-00592-23-9.
