= Alex Roberts (cricketer) =

English cricketer

Personal information
- Full name: Alex Roberts
- Born: 21 June 1983 (age 43); Stockton-on-Tees, County Durham, England
- Nickname: Robbo
- Batting: Right-handed
- Bowling: Right-arm medium

Domestic team information
- Years: Team
- 2009: Leicestershire
- 2008: Essex
- 2007-present: Cumberland
- 2002: Yorkshire Cricket Board

Career statistics
Competition	LA	T20
Matches	1	2
Runs scored	1	–
Batting average	1.00	–
100s/50s	–/–	–/–
Top score	1	–
Balls bowled	24	6
Wickets	1	–
Bowling average	22.00	–
5 wickets in innings	–	–
10 wickets in match	–	–
Best bowling	1/22	–
Catches/stumpings	–/–	–/–
- Source: Cricinfo, 4 November 2010

Alex Roberts (born 21 June 1983 in Stockton-on-Tees, County Durham, England) is a former professional English cricketer. Roberts is a right-handed batsman who bowls right-arm quick ( Swing ). Alex held full-time contracts with Yorkshire, Durham, Essex, and Leicestershire, and represented England from the under-13 to under-19 levels. He was very unlucky not to get more game time at Essex, as he was drafted in to cover for Ravi Bopara, who was ever-present in the England side at that point. Since then, he has carved out a fantastic club career in England, Australia, and New Zealand as a genuine all-rounder. He was educated at King's Manor School and Teesside Tertiary College in Middlesbrough.

Roberts made a single List A cricket List A appearance for the Yorkshire Cricket Board, against the Northamptonshire Cricket Board, in the first round of the 2003 Cheltenham & Gloucester Trophy, which was played in 2002. In his only List A match, he scored a single run, and took one wicket at a cost of 22 runs.

Roberts made his debut for Cumberland in the 2007 Minor Counties Championship against Suffolk. From 2007 to 2009, he represented Cumberland in eight Minor Counties Championship matches, the last of which came against Lincolnshire. He also represented Cumberland in the MCCA Knockout Trophy. His debut in that competition for the county came against Cheshire in 2009. From 2009 to present, he has represented the county in six Trophy matches.

Roberts played one Twenty20 match for Essex in the 2008 Twenty20 Cup, and then a Twenty20 match for Leicestershire in the 2009 Twenty20 Cup.

Roberts has played and coached in Western Australia the last three seasons and dominated local cricket finishing top of the run charts in two of those three seasons averaging 55 with bat and 19 with the ball and currently sits on 49 Career first grade Tons
