= Andrew Wright (cricketer) =

English cricketer (born 1980)

Andrew Wright (born 30 June 1980) is an English cricketer. He is a left-handed batsman and occasional wicketkeeper who played for Huntingdonshire. He was born in Peterborough.

Wright, who played for the side in the Minor Counties Trophy between 2000 and 2002, and for Gloucestershire Second XI between 2001 and 2002, made a single List A appearance for the side, during the 2003 Cheltenham & Gloucester Trophy in August 2002, against Cheshire. From the opening order, he scored 6 runs.

Between 2001 and 2006, Wright played in the East Anglian Premier League. In 2014 he returned to play for Huntingdon & District Cricket Club and helped them to the Huntingdonshire Cricket League Division 1 title.
