= David Edward Lewis =

Australian philanthropist (1866–1941)

David (Dafydd) Edward Lewis (7 March 1866 – 17 August 1941) was a Welsh-born businessman and philanthropist who emigrated to Australia and became well-known and successful there.

Lewis was born in Llanrhystud near Aberystwyth, Cardiganshire, Wales, the son of David Lewis, a farmer, and his wife Catherine, née Mason.

Lewis migrated to Melbourne, Australia, in 1890; opening a drapery shop in 1902 which became a successful business. In 1928 he donated £2000 to the engineering school of the University of Melbourne for laboratory extensions.

== Scholarship funds ==
Lewis bequeathed a £700,000 endowment that after his death established the Dafydd Lewis Trust. This provided scholarships for full-time degree courses (other than in theology, arts, music or education) at the University of Melbourne for boys from Victorian state schools whose parents could not afford to pay for a university education.

Although the original scholarships helped to support post-graduate education as well as a first degree, as of 2024 only undergraduate study is supported, for up to three years.

In 2004 a parallel scholarship fund, the Mary Jane Lewis Foundation was established to give scholarships to female university students in Victoria at the undergraduate level. The fund is named after Dafydd Lewis' second wife Mary Jane Jones Evans.
