= Andrew Wright (artist) =

Canadian artist (born 1971)

- Born: 1971; Cambridge, England
- Known for: multimedia artist

Andrew Wright RCA (born 1971) is a Canadian multimedia artist based in Ottawa, Ontario.

== Life ==
Wright was born 4 September 1971 in Cambridge, England. He holds a specialist degree in Art and Art History from the University of Toronto (1994) and a Masters in Fine Arts at the University of Windsor (1997). Wright is currently associate professor in the Department of Visual Art at the University of Ottawa.

== Work ==
Many of Wright's pieces have explored the nature of perception, photographic structures and technologies. His work, Home and Garden (Oakville Galleries, Oakville, Ontario 2002) presented the Gairloch Gardens in Oakville using three different photographic means: an antique camera lucida, a modern still camera and a video camera. The results, suggested by Elaine Hujer (Hamilton Spectator, 2003), are "so profoundly distinctive that viewers may be inspired to review, reinvestigate and reinterpret their own ideas about Oakville's stately lakeside manor."

Wright has also created several large-scale photographs by converting a large gallery space and his studio into a giant pin-hole camera. With reference to Wright's Skies piece, Kevin Temple suggests that this work, "is a meditation on modern photographic technology that's able to remove all traces of the process from the picture. Now automated cameras can eliminate the photographer entirely. By controlling his own process – in effect, avoiding its mechanization – Wright draws attention to the act of mediated representation."

== Honours ==
- Winner of the inaugural BMW Prize in Photography, 2011
- OAAG (Ontario Association of Art Galleries) Award, Multi-Media, for the publication Blind Man's Bluff: 2006
- CFAP (Canadian Forces Artist Program) participant, 2005
- Winner of the Ernst & Young Great Canadian Printmaking Competition (2001)

== Collections ==
Wright's work is held in the collections of the National Gallery of Canada, and of Canada House, the Canadian High Commission in London.

== Selected bibliography ==
- Mark Cheetham, Water's Edge, Border Crossings Magazine (Canada) (Issue #103, Fall 2007)
- Robert Reid, The Wright Stuff, The Record (Waterloo Region) (May 19, 2007)
- Gary Michael Dault, Floating Around, Looking at Things, The Globe and Mail (April 24, 2004)
- Kevin Temple, No-Tricks Photography, Now Magazine (April 8, 2004)
- Gary Michael Dault, A Movie, An Experience, At One Remove, The Globe and Mail (June 14, 2003)
- Robert Reid, Video Sheds Funky New Light on Blind Man's Bluff, The Record (Waterloo Region), (May 24, 2003)
- Thomas Hirschmann, Sensory Deception: Two shows play tricks with sight and sound, Now Magazine (June 12, 2003)
- Elaine Hujer, A Garden of Illuminated Delights, Hamilton Spectator (January 11, 2003)
