= Roger Hudson (cricketer) =

English cricketer

Personal information
- Full name: Roger Douglas Hudson
- Born: 8 June 1967 (age 59); Selly Oak, Birmingham, England
- Batting: Right-handed
- Bowling: Right-arm medium

Domestic team information
- Years: Team
- 1999: Huntingdonshire
- 1997: Oxford University

Career statistics
Competition	FC	LA
Matches	11	1
Runs scored	202	12
Batting average	11.22	12.00
100s/50s	–/1	–/–
Top score	62	12
Balls bowled	246	–
Wickets	–	–
Bowling average	–	–
5 wickets in innings	–	–
10 wickets in match	–	–
Best bowling	–	–
Catches/stumpings	2/–	1/–
- Source: Cricinfo, 7 July 2010

Roger Douglas Hudson (born 8 June 1967) is an English former cricketer. Hudson was a right-handed batsman who bowled right-arm medium pace. He was born at Selly Oak, Warwickshire. He was educated at Oxford University.

Hudson made his first-class debut for Oxford University against Durham. During the 1997 season, he represented the university in 11 first-class matches, with his final first-class appearance coming against Cambridge University. In his 11 first-class matches, he scored 202 runs at a batting average of 11.22, with a single half century high score of 62.

In 1999, Hudson played the only List-A match of his career for Huntingdonshire in the 1999 NatWest Trophy against Bedfordshire. In the match he scored 12 runs and a took a single catch.

Hudson moved to Australia in 2001 and took up golf.
