= Gordon Edwards (cricketer) =

English cricketer and mechanical engineer

Gordon Edwards (born 17 September 1947 in Glapthorn) is a mechanical engineer and former English first-class cricketer (active 1973) who played for Nottinghamshire.

== Education and Working Life ==
Edwards obtained BSc and PhD degrees in mechanical engineering from the University of Nottingham, during which time he played for Nottinghamshire County Cricket Club, before working for Shell in the Netherlands and Brunei. His final position in Shell was head of engineering research for the Shell Group.

In 1997, he left the company to set up a higher education consultancy. In this he specialised in course design and teaching in the areas of entrepreneurship, project management, research methodology and complex systems research.

He was also involved extensively in external quality assurance activities in the higher education sector on behalf of the government's Quality Assurance Agency – leading teams of auditors and reviewers to examine educational quality and standards across many universities and colleges – both at the subject and institutional levels. He has now retired and runs a small hobby/business reconditioning vintage car foot pumps.

== Bibliography ==
Vintage Foot Pumps 1900–1950: Design, Overhaul and Maintenance topics (ISBN 9781788085717)
