= Michael Sutliff =

English cricketer (born 1975)

Michael Sutliff (born 8 November 1975) was an English cricketer. He was a left-handed batsman and a wicket-keeper.

Born in Melton Mowbray, he played for the Leicestershire Cricket Board in List A cricket, between 1999 and 2002, having represented Leicestershire County Cricket Club in the Second XI championship since his debut in 1992 at the age of 16.

Sutliff represented the Leicestershire Board four times in the NatWest (later the C&G) trophy, and played once for the Gloucestershire County Board. He did not appear in any first-class cricket. Most recently, Sutliff has lined up for Cambridgeshire in the Minor Counties Championship.
