= Martin Stovold =

English cricketer

Personal information
- Full name: Martin Willis Stovold
- Born: 28 December 1955; Almondsbury, Gloucestershire, England
- Died: 11 May 2012 (aged 56); Cheltenham, Gloucestershire, England
- Batting: Left-handed
- Role: Batsman

Domestic team information
- Years: Team
- 1978–1982: Gloucestershire

Career statistics
| Competition | FC | List A |
|---|---|---|
| Matches | 25 | 34 |
| Runs scored | 518 | 325 |
| Batting average | 16.70 | 13.00 |
| 100s/50s | 0/2 | 0/0 |
| Top score | 75* | 32 |
| Balls bowled |
| Wickets |
| Bowling average |
| 5 wickets in innings |
| 10 wickets in match |
| Best bowling |
| Catches/stumpings |
- Source: Cricinfo, 29 July 2013

Martin Stovold (28 December 1955 – 11 May 2012) was an English cricketer. He played for Gloucestershire between 1978 and 1982.
