= Huntingdonshire County Cricket Club =

Minor English cricket club

Personnel
- Captain: Bash Hussain

Team information
- Founded: 1948
- Home ground: Various

History
- FP Trophy wins: 0
- MCCA Knockout Trophy wins: 0
- Official website: Huntingdonshire Cricket

Huntingdonshire County Cricket Club is one of the county clubs which make up the minor counties in the English domestic cricket structure, representing the historic county of Huntingdonshire. The club does not currently compete in either the Minor Counties Championship or MCCA Knockout Trophy, but does play informal matches, typically against armed forces teams and county academies.

== Earliest cricket ==
Cricket probably reached Huntingdonshire in the 17th century. The earliest reference to the game in the general region is in neighbouring Cambridgeshire at the University of Cambridge in 1710. In 1741, John Montagu, 4th Earl of Sandwich became patron and captain of a Huntingdonshire county team which, as part of a united Northamptonshire & Huntingdonshire team, twice defeated Bedfordshire in important matches.

== Origin of the club ==
Huntingdonshire County Cricket Club was first formed in 1831 and existed until 1895. Initially, until the early 1850s, matches were played against club teams but from the start of the 1850s the club found regular county opponents.

Up until 1874 Huntingdonshire played home matches at Millers Holme, Godmanchester. From 1874 the club played at the Huntingdon Cricket Club Ground and continues to do so to this day. In 1895 the club was disbanded. In the 1920s the club was briefly reformed before folding once again. The current county club was formed in 1948.

From 1999 to 2003, the county entered teams into the English domestic one-day competition, matches which had List A status. The county played seven List A matches during this period, with the final List A match it played coming against Cheshire. During this period, the club used The Parks, Godmanchester as its home ground.

== Players ==
See List of Huntingdonshire County Cricket Club List A players and Category:Huntingdonshire cricketers

== Grounds ==
The home grounds Huntingdon used for its List A and MCCA Trophy matches are listed below.

Name	Location	List A	MCCA Trophy	First match	Last match	Refs
Kimbolton School Ground	Kimbolton	0 (Note: Women's List A cricket has been played on the ground. Cambridgeshire played one Minor Counties Championship match on the ground in 1996.)	5	17 May 1998 v Oxfordshire	23 June 2002 v Leicestershire Cricket Board	
Cricketfield Lane	Ramsey	0 (Note: Women's Twenty20 cricket has been played on the ground.)	1	2 July 2000 v Middlesex Cricket Board	–	
Sports Field	Warboys	0	1	9 July 2000 v Hertfordshire	–	
The Parks	Godmanchester	2	1	16 May 2000 v Yorkshire Cricket Board	29 August 2001 v Gloucestershire Cricket Board	
Papworth Cricket Club Ground	Papworth Everard	0 (Note: Women's List A cricket has been played on the ground. Cambridgeshire played seven Minor Counties Championship matches on the ground between 1975 and 1981.)	1	3 June 2001 v Suffolk	–	
Bretton Gate	Peterborough	0 (Note: Women's List A cricket has been played on the ground. Cambridgeshire have played Minor Counties Championship matches on the ground since 1983 and National Counties Trophy and Twenty20 matches on the ground since 2018, and Northants have used the ground for Second XI matches.)	1	9 June 2002 v Lincolnshire	–	

== Bibliography ==
- Altham, H. S. (1962). A History of Cricket, Volume 1 (to 1914). George Allen & Unwin.
- Maun, Ian (2009). From Commons to Lord's, Volume One: 1700 to 1750. Roger Heavens. ISBN 978-1-900592-52-9.
