= Yorkshire Cricket Board =

Sports governing body in England

The Yorkshire Cricket Board is the governing body for all recreational cricket in the historic county of Yorkshire.

From 1999 to 2003 the Board fielded a team in the English domestic one-day tournament, matches which had List A status.

== See also ==
- List of Yorkshire Cricket Board List A players
