= Gloucestershire Cricket Board =

Governing body for cricket in Gloucestershire

The Gloucestershire Cricket Board (GCB) is the governing body for all recreational cricket in the historic county of Gloucestershire.

From 1999 to 2003 the Board fielded a team in the early rounds of English domestic one-day tournament matches, which had List A status. They played a total of seven List A games, winning two.

== See also ==
- List of Gloucestershire Cricket Board List A players
