= List of Kent Cricket Board List A players =

This is a list of cricketers who played List A cricket for Kent Cricket Board (KCB). The team, which was made up of recreational club players, played 13 List A cricket matches in knock-out competitions between 1999 and 2003 and competed in other competitions organised by the England and Wales Cricket Board between 1998 and 2003. The team won eight List A matches, reaching the third round of the competition each season in which they played. As well as six victories against other Cricket Board teams, they beat Buckinghamshire County Cricket Club, a Minor Counties team, in 2001 and Denmark, an ICC Trophy team at the time, in 1999. In each season they were defeated by first-class counties, losing to Hampshire three times, and Warwickshire and Derbyshire once.

This is a list of the players who appeared in the List A matches the team played. Many players also played for the team in Minor Counties Trophy matches and for other teams in a range of competitions. Only their List A appearances for KCB are shown here.

== A ==
Name	Seasons (Note: The range of seasons the player represented Kent Cricket Board in List A cricket.)	Matches	Comments	Ref
Mark Alexander	1999–2001	9	Born at Farnborough in 1962, Alexander played club cricket for Bexley, Bromley and Tunbridge Wells Cricket Clubs between 1983 and 2011. He played 15 Minor Counties Trophy matches for the team between 1998 and 2002 and keep wicket in the three List A matches it played in 2001. Scored a total of 198 runs in his nine List A matches for KCB, including a century against Worcestershire Cricket Board in 1999. Played a single Second Eleven Championship match for Kent County Cricket Club in 1982.	

== B ==
Name	Seasons	Matches	Comments	Ref
Matthew Banes	2001–2003	3	Played 11 first-class matches, including three for Kent County Cricket Club, between 1999 and 2003. For KCB he scored 110 runs, with a highest score of 82 made against Leicestershire Cricket Board on his debut for the team, and took one wicket.	
Matthew Bennett	2002–2003	2	A wicket-keeper, Bennett played two matches for KCB in the 2003 Cheltenham & Gloucester Trophy, the first to rounds of which were played towards the end of the 2002 season. He was born at Epsom in Surrey in 1982 and played club cricket for The Mote between 1999 and 2003 before playing for Reigate Priory in the Surrey Cricket League between 2004 and 2012. He played for the ECB Schools team against the West Indies under-19 cricket team in 2001, friendly matches for Kent and Essex County Cricket Clubs second XIs, and for MCC in matches between 2006 and 2012.	
Kenny Bingham	2002	2	Played in two matches for KCB in 2002, playing as the wicket-keeper in the first and a batsman in the second. Born at Oxford in 1980 at educated at St Edmund's School in Oxford, Bingham played club cricket for Gore Court and Sevenoaks Vine between 2001 and 2004 before playing in the Oxford area until 2013. He played in three Minor Counties Trophy matches for KCB in 2002 and a number of times for Kent County Cricket Club's Second XI during the same year.	
John Bowden	1999–2003	12	Bowden first played club cricket for Sevenoaks Vine in 1990 and had played for Sussex County Cricket Club's Second XI in 1997 before playing for KCB between 1998 and 2003, appearing in 14 Minor Counties Trophy matches as well as 12 List A fixtures. He scored a total of 342 List A runs, with a highest score of 98 made against Worcestershire Cricket Board in 2000. In MCT matches he scored two centuries, with hisa highest score of 121 coming against Oxfordshire in 2000. He was born at Sidcup in 1973.	
Andy Bray	2000–2001	5	Born in London in 1979, Bray played six Minor Counties Trophy matches for KCB and appeared for the Second XIs of Kent, Essex and Hampshire County Cricket Clubs between 1999 and 2002. A right-arm pace bowler, he took four wickets in his five List A matches. He played club cricket for Hythe between 1996 and 1998 and from 1997 played for Folkestone in the Kent Cricket League.	

== D ==
Name	Seasons	Matches	Comments	Ref
Matthew Dennington	2003	1	A South African all-rounder, Dennington made his first-class debut for Kent County Cricket Club before playing his only match for KCB during 2003. He went on to play 36 senior matches for Kent teams before being released at the end of the 2006 season.	

== F ==
Name	Seasons	Matches	Comments	Ref
Matthew Featherstone	1999–2000	6	Featherstone scored 205 runs in his six List A matches for KCB, including a century scored on his debut against Denmark in the 1999 NatWest Trophy. He also played seven Minor Counties Trophy matches for the team between 1998 and 2000. Born at Bromley in 1970 and educated at Millfield, Featherstone played internationally for Brazil between 2000 and 2018, making 47 appearances for the team, later becoming the President of Cricket Brazil.	
Rob Ferley	2001–2002	2	Played in over 100 top-class matches, playing for Kent and Nottinghamshire County Cricket Clubs between 2003 and 2010. Ferley took three wickets in his two List A matches for KCB and also played a Minor Counties Trophy match for the team in 2001.	

== G ==
Name	Seasons	Matches	Comments	Ref
Mark George	2003	1	An Australian born at Ryde, New South Wales in 1977, George spent three summers playing for The Mote between 2001 and 2003. He scored seven runs and took one wicket in his only List A appearance. He was a member of the Queensland Academy of Sport between 2001 and 2007 and had played for Queensland under-19s.	
James Golding	1999	3	Made his first-class debut for Kent County Cricket Club soon after playing for KCB, going on to play 47 top-level matches for the county team between 1999 and 2002. Golding played eight Minor Counties Trophy matches for KCB before going on to play Minor Counties cricket for Wiltshire County Cricket Club between 2005 and 2009.	

== H ==
Name	Seasons	Matches	Comments	Ref
James Hodgson	2001–2002	2	Hodgson was born at Reading, Berkshire in 1972 and played for England Schools and toured New Zealand with Young England in 1990/91, playing in one under-19 One Day International. He played Second XI cricket for Nottinghamshire County Cricket Club in 1991 and Minor Counties cricket for Berkshire between 1993 and 1998, before playing club cricket for The Mote from 1995. He had played one List A match for Berkshire before his two matches for KCB, for whom he scored a total of 51 runs.	

== J ==
Name	Seasons	Matches	Comments	Ref
Lewis Jenkins	2001	4	Played under-19 and Second XI cricket for Kent County Cricket Club in 2000 and 2001 as well as four Minor Counties Trophy matches for KCB, also in 2001. Born at Canterbury in 1981, Jenkins played club cricket for St Lawrence and Highland Court from 1998. In his four List matches he scored a total of 91 runs, including an unbeaten half-century made against Leicestershire Cricket Board.	
Gary Joyce	1999	3	Born at Frome in Somerset in 1964, Joyce played under-25 and Second XI cricket for Somerset County Cricket Club between 1980 and 1984. A wicket-keeper, he played for Bexley in the Kent Cricket League between 1994 and 2013, during which time he played in KCB's 1999 NatWest Trophy, scoring a total of 10 runs, as well as playing twice for the team in the Minor Counties Trophy.	

== L ==
Name	Seasons	Matches	Comments	Ref
Paul Lazenbury	2001	3	Born at Bath, Somerset in 1978, Lazenbury played List A cricket for three teams: Gloucestershire Cricket Board in 1999, KCB in 2001 and Herefordshire County Cricket Club in 2002. He played Minor Counties Trophy cricket for all three teams as well as Minor Counties Championship for Herefordshire and Second XI matches for Gloucestershire, Kent, Nottinghamshire, Essex and Worcestershire County Cricket Clubs between 1995 and 2001. He played for KCB whilst on the staff at Kent and playing club cricket at Ashford; he took one wicket and scored 112 runs for the team, with a highest score of 88 not out made against Warwickshire County Cricket Club.	
James Lincoln	2001–2003	5	In his five List A matches for KCB, Lincoln score a total of 11 runs and took a single wicket. He played seven Minor Counties Trophy matches for the team between 2001 and 2002 and Second XI cricket for Kent County Cricket Club between 2001 and 2003. Born at Ashford, Middlesex in 1981, he played club cricket in the Kent Cricket League for Bapchild, Gore Court, St Lawrence and Highland Court, Bickley Park and Roebucks.	
Alex Loudon	2001	1	After making his first-class debut for Durham UCCE earlier in 2001, Louden scored 53 runs in his only match for KCB later in the year. Went on to play for England in a One Day International and was a member of the England Test squad which toured Pakistan in 2005. Played in over 150 top-level matches for Kent and Warwickshire County Cricket Clubs between 2002 and 2007 before retiring to focus on a career in business.	
Hugo Loudon	2002–2003	2	The older brother of Alex Loudon, Hugo Loudon was born in London in 1978 and educated at Eton College and Durham University, where he played three first-class matches for Durham UCCE in 2001. He played Second XI cricket for Hampshire, where he was on the county's staff for a time, and Kent County Cricket Clubs and one Minor Counties Trophy match for Hampshire Cricket Board. He played club cricket for Ashford and Sevenoaks Vine and played in matches for MCC between 1997 and 2014. In his two List A matches for KCB he scored 57 runs and took one wicket.	

== M ==
Name	Seasons	Matches	Comments	Ref
Kevin Masters	1999–2002	12	Born at Chatham, Kent in 1961, Masters had played four first-class matches for Kent County Cricket Club in 1983 and 1984 and List A and Minor County cricket for Cambridgeshire before playing 12 List A and 15 Minor Counties Trophy matches for KCB. He took six wickets and score nine runs in List A matches for the team. Two of his sons, David and Daniel Masters played county cricket, David playing almost 400 top-level matches for Kent, Leicestershire and Essex.	
Ryan Minter	2001–2002	2	Took seven wickets for KCB, with best bowling figures of 6/8 taken on his debut against Leicestershire Cricket Board. Minter was born at Canterbury in 1979 and played club cricket for the Beverley and Canterbury clubs in the city. He played in three Minor Counties Trophy matches for KCB between 2000 and 2002.	
Leon Morgan	2001–2003	3	As well as three List A matches for KCB, Morgan, who was born at Willesborough in Kent in 1979, played five Minor Counties Trophy matches for the team. He scored a total of 66 List A runs. He played club cricket for Folkestone and for Hythe and for Kent County Cricket Club's Second XI and under-21 team in 2003.	

== R ==
Name	Seasons	Matches	Comments	Ref
Terry Rollock	2003	1	Rollock played his only List A match for KCB, having previously played 11 first-class matches for Barbados during the 1990s, including a match against a touring England team in 1998. He was born at Saint Lucy, Barbados in 1969 and played club cricket for Lordswood in the Kent Cricket League and for Liverpool Cricket Club.	
James Rowe	2002	1	The son of Charles Rowe who played almost 300 top-level matches for Kent and Glamorgan County Cricket Clubs, Rowe was born at Farnborough, London in 1979. He played three first-class matches for Durham UCCE in 2001 and made his only List A appearance for KCB the following year, scoring 30 runs against Hampshire County Cricket Club. He played club cricket for Sevenoaks Vine and appeared for the Second XIs of both Kent and Essex County Cricket Clubs.	

== S ==
Name	Seasons	Matches	Comments	Ref
Darren Scott	2002	1	Took one wicket and scored seven runs in his only List A match for KCB, having played eight first-class and four List A matches for Kent County Cricket Club between 1998 and 2000. Scott also played five Minor Counties Trophy matches for KCB. He was born at Canterbury in 1972 and later became the Director of Cricket at Kent College in the city.	
Shammi Iqbal	1999–2003	8	The son of Pakistan Test cricketer Asif Iqbal, who played for Kent County Cricket Club between 1968 and 1982, Shammi was born at Farnborough, London in 1975. He played club cricket for Sevenoaks Vine from 1994 and Second XI cricket for Kent in 1998. In his eight List A matches he scored a total of 105 runs, with a top score of 33 made against Hampshire County Cricket Club, and captained the team during the 2003 season. He also made 16 Minor Counties Trophy appearances for KCB, scoring a century against Buckinghamshire County Cricket Club in 2000.	
Grant Sheen	1999–2001	5	Born at Bromley in 1974, Sheen took seven wickets and scored 70 runs, with a highest score of 45, in his five List A matches for KCB. He had played Second XI cricket for Middlesex, Hampshire and Kent County Cricket Club between 1993 and 1997 and played in seven Minor Counties Trophy matches for KCB. He played club cricket for Bromley and Hayes in the Kent Cricket League.	
Jeffrey Snowden	2001	1	Made his only List A appearance in a rain-affected match against Hampshire Cricket Board in the first round of the 2001 Cheltenham & Gloucester Trophy which KCB won in a bowl-out after only 10 overs play was possible. He did not bat or bowl in the match. Snowden was born at Dartford in 1973 and played club cricket for Dartford Cricket Club between 1990 and 2008.	
Eddie Stanford	1999–2001	7	A slow left-arm orthodox bowler who had played five first-class matches for Kent County Cricket Club between 1995 and 1997 before being released by the team at the end of the 1998 season, Stanford took 10 wickets for KCB. He was born at Dartford in 1971 and played club cricket for Dartford, Bromley and Bexley Cricket Clubs. He also played in eight Minor Counties Trophy matches for KCB.	

== T ==
Name	Seasons	Matches	Comments	Ref
Chris Tooley	1999	1	Tooley played 25 first-class matches, all whilst at Oxford University between 1985 and 1987, as well as seven List A matches for Combined Universities. He was born at Bromley in 1964 and played club cricket for Bromley Cricket Club between 1983 and 2016. In his only List A match for KCB he scored 24 runs. He also played in a Minor Counties Trophy match for the team in 1998, scoring 37.	
James Tredwell	2000–2001	6	Future England cricket team captain who played for Kent County Cricket Club between 2001 and 2018 having been signed to a developmental contract in 2001. Tredwell made his senior cricket debut for KCB, playing six List A and five Minor Counties Trophy matches for the team between 1999 and 2001. He scored 166 runs, with a highest score of 71, and took three List A wickets for the team.	
Damon Trigger	1999–2003	10	Born at Lower Hutt in New Zealand, Trigger played club cricket for St Lawrence and Highland Court in the Kent Cricket League and made a single appearance for Kent County Cricket Club's Second XI in 2000. For KCB he took 14 wickets and scored a total of 56 runs in his 10 List A matches.	
Andy Tutt	1999–2002	10	A right-arm medium pace bowler, Tutt took 9 wickets in List A matches for KCB, captaining the team in 1999 when they beat Denmark in the Cheltenham & Gloucester Trophy. He played a single first-class match for Kent County Cricket Club in 1992 and for the county Second XI in 1992 and 1993. He was born at Bermondsey in 1968 and worked as a florist in London. He played in the Kent Cricket League for several teams.	

== W ==
Name	Seasons	Matches	Comments	Ref
Andrew Walton	2000	3	A Zimbabwean born in 1965 who played Kent Cricket League cricket for Bromley Cricket Club and Lordswood between 1994 and 2002. Walton took four wickets and scored 13 runs in his three List A matches for KCB. He played a single Minor Counties Trophy match for the team in the same year and has played Over-50s World Cup cricket for Zimbabwe.	
Simon Williams	1999–2000	6	Williams had previously played two List A, 16 Minor Counties Championship and ten Minor Counties Trophy matches for Cambridgeshire County Cricket Club before he played for KCB. A right-handed batsman, he scored 130 runs for the team, with a highest score of 45. He also played nine Minor Counties Trophy matches for KCB and club cricket for Blackheath. He was born at Lambeth in 1970.	
