= Mark George =

Mark George may refer to:

- Mark George (English cricketer) (born 1975)
- Mark George (Australian cricketer) (born 1977)
- Mark S. George (born 1958), American neuroscientist

== See also ==
- George Marks (disambiguation)
