= George Barton =

George Barton may refer to:

- George Barton (cricketer) (1808–1864), English cricketer
- George Elliott Barton (1827–1906), New Zealand politician and lawyer
- George Burnett Barton (1836–1901), Australian and New Zealand lawyer and historian
- George Hunt Barton (1852–1933), American geologist, Arctic explorer, and college professor
- George Aaron Barton (1859–1942), Canadian clergyman
- George Barton (footballer) (1934–1977), Australian rules footballer
- George Barton (sport shooter) (born 1977), Australian sport shooter
- George Barton (rugby union, born 1997), Canadian rugby union player
- George Barton (rugby union, born 2000), English rugby union player
