= Brain Stimulation (journal) =

- Discipline: Neuromodulation
- Language: English
- Edited by: Mark S. George

Publication details
- History: 2008-present
- Publisher: Elsevier
- Frequency: Bimonthly
- Open access: Yes
- Impact factor: 9.611 (2021)

Standard abbreviations
- ISO 4: Brain Stimul.

Indexing
- ISSN: 1935-861X
- LCCN: 2007214181
- OCLC no.: 192010222

Links
- Journal homepage; Online access; Online archive

Brain Stimulation is a bimonthly peer-reviewed medical journal covering the field of neuromodulation. It was established in 2008 and is published by Elsevier. The editor-in-chief is Mark S. George (Medical University of South Carolina). It publishes original research, reviews, and editorials covering various modalities of neuromodulation such as transcranial magnetic stimulation, electrical deep brain stimulation, transcranial direct-current stimulation, ultrasound neuromodulation, and optogenetics.

== Abstracting and indexing ==
The journal is abstracted and indexed in:

- BIOSIS Previews
- Biological Abstracts
- Current Contents/Clinical Medicine
- Index Medicus/MEDLINE/PubMed
- Neuroscience Citation Index
- PsycINFO
- Science Citation Index Expanded
- Scopus

According to the Journal Citation Reports, the journal has a 2018 impact factor of 6.919.
