= George Marks =

George Marks may refer to:

- George Marks (footballer, born 1915) (1915–1998), English association football player
- George Marks, 1st Baron Marks (1858–1938)
- George Marks (soccer, born 1999), American professional soccer player
- George Marks, List of Cold Case characters
- George Thomas Marks (1856–1907), businessman and politician in Ontario, Canada
- George Harrison Marks (1926–1997), photographer
- E. George Marks (c. 1885–1935), Australian journalist and author
