= Kenneth Bingham =

Kenneth Bingham may refer to:

- Kenny Bingham (born 1980), cricketer
- Ken Bingham, a character in Ann Carver's Profession
- Kenneth Bingham (politician) (born 1962), member of the South Carolina House of Representatives
