= Edward Brander =

English cricketer

Personal information
- Full name: Edward Richard Spieker Brander
- Born: 21 July 1845; Dartford, Kent, England
- Died: 2 May 1883 (aged 37); Southbourne, Hampshire, England
- Batting: Unknown

Career statistics
Competition	First-class
Matches	1
Runs scored	2
Batting average	2.00
100s/50s	–/–
Top score	2
Balls bowled	–
Wickets	–
Bowling average	–
5 wickets in innings	–
10 wickets in match	–
Best bowling	–
Catches/stumpings	–/–
- Source: Cricinfo, 28 May 2013

Edward Richard Spieker Brander (21 July 1845 – 2 May 1883) was an English cricketer. Brander's batting style is unknown. He was born at Dartford, Kent.

Educated at Cheltenham College, where he played for the college cricket team, Brander made a single first-class appearance for the Orleans Club against the touring Australians in 1878 at the Orleans Club Ground. Batting once in the match, Brander was dismissed for 2 runs by Frank Allan in a match which ended in a draw.

Outside of cricket, Brander served in the East Surrey Regiment as a captain, serving from 1864 until his death at Southbourne, Hampshire on 2 May 1883.
