= Mary Ann Lake Wallis =

Mary Ann Lake Wallis (1821–1910) was a New Zealand orphanage matron. She was born in Dartford, Kent, England.

She was the founder and manager of the pioneer Hulmers orphanage in Motueka in 1867–1910.
