= David Masters =

English cricketer

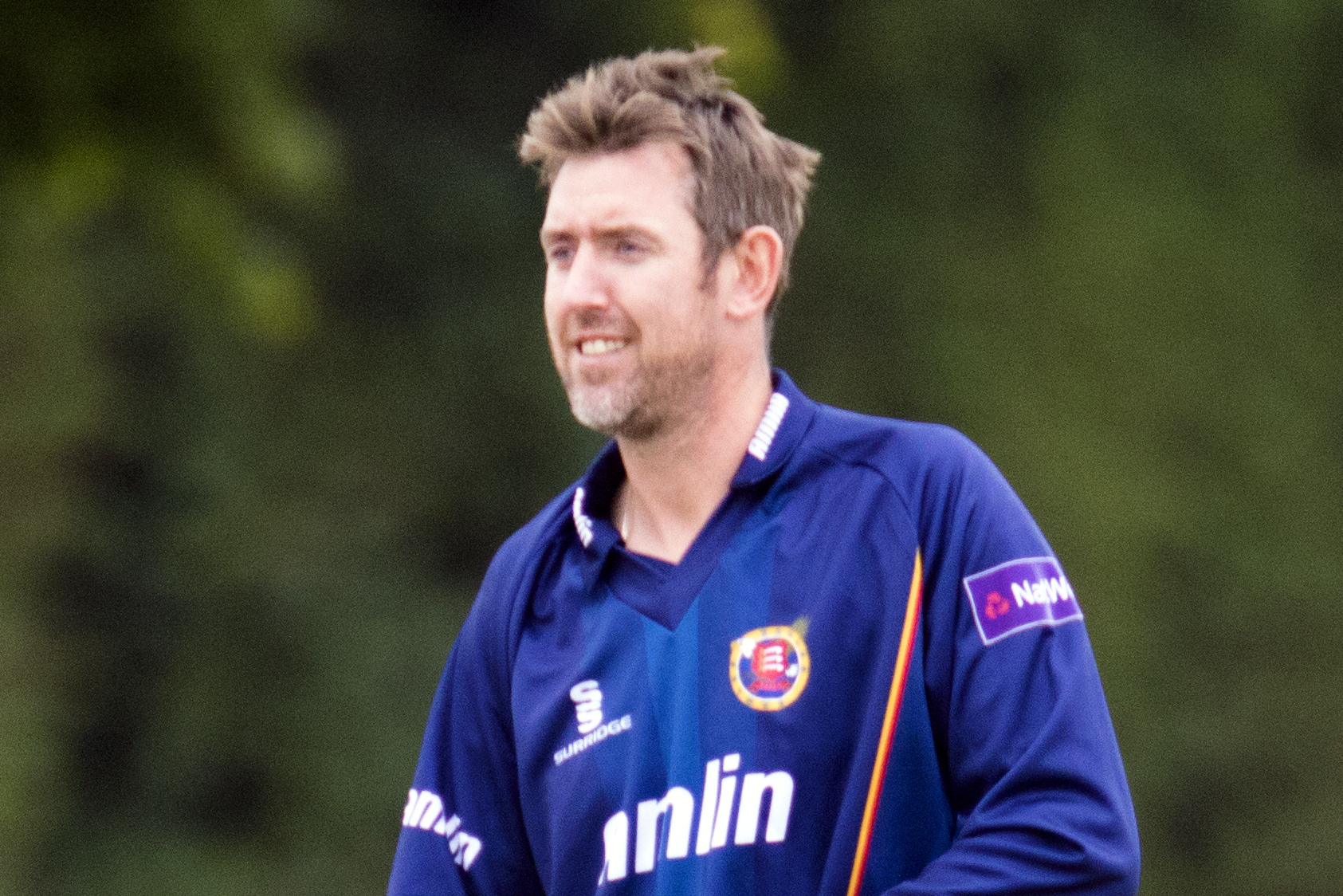

Personal information
- Full name: David Daniel Masters
- Born: 22 April 1978 (age 48); Chatham, Kent
- Nickname: Hod
- Batting: Right-handed
- Bowling: Right-arm medium-fast
- Role: Bowler
- Relatives: Kevin Masters (father); Daniel Masters (brother)

Domestic team information
- Years: Team
- 2000–2002: Kent
- 2003–2007: Leicestershire
- 2008–2016: Essex
- FC debut: 3 May 2000 Kent v Zimbabweans
- Last FC: 20 September 2016 Essex v Kent
- LA debut: 18 April 2000 Kent v Essex
- Last LA: 17 August 2016 Essex v Warwickshire

Career statistics
Competition	FC	LA	T20
Matches	202	178	127
Runs scored	2,829	575	114
Batting average	13.73	11.27	5.42
100s/50s	1/6	0/0	0/0
Top score	119	39	14
Balls bowled	37,788	7,682	2,510
Wickets	672	176	92
Bowling average	25.15	32.38	33.52
5 wickets in innings	31	2	0
10 wickets in match	0	0	0
Best bowling	8/10	5/17	3/7
Catches/stumpings	60/–	22/–	25/–
- Source: CricInfo, 23 September 2016

David Daniel Masters (born 22 April 1978) is a former English cricketer who played for Kent, Leicestershire and Essex County Cricket Clubs between 2000 and 2016.

Masters was born at Chatham in Kent in 1978 and educated at Fort Luton High School and Mid-Kent College. He made his senior cricket debut for Kent in 2000 as a seam bowler. He left Kent to join Leicestershire ahead of the 2003 season and was named the county's player of the year in 2005 after taking 45 wickets in all competitions. In August 2007 he agreed to join Essex on a three-year contract, remaining with the county from the start of the 2008 season until he retired at the end of the 2016 season.

Masters took 672 first-class wickets in his 16-year career. He was described as a "nagging medium-paced journeyman" and a "dependable performer" who led the Essex bowling attack in the later years of his career as a "metronomically reliable leader". He bowled a range of seam bowling variations and moved the ball reliably. He was praised on his retirement for his "skill, consistency and longevity".

Masters' best bowling performance was figures of 8/10 taken against Leicestershire at Southend in 2011. During the off-season he worked in the family building firm, initially as a labourer, preferring to keep fit by working rather than in the gym, and in his later career as a contract manager.

Masters' father Kevin played briefly for Kent in the 1980s. His brother Daniel played briefly for Leicestershire between 2009 and 2010.
