= Andrew Walton =

Zimbabwean-born English cricketer

Personal information
- Full name: Andrew P Walton
- Born: 28 February 1965 (age 61); Rhodesia
- Batting: Right-handed
- Bowling: Right-arm medium

Domestic team information
- Years: Team
- 2000: Kent Cricket Board

Career statistics
Competition	List A
Matches	3
Runs scored	13
Batting average	4.33
100s/50s	0/0
Top score	8
Balls bowled	98
Wickets	4
Bowling average	22.25
5 wickets in innings	0
10 wickets in match	0
Best bowling	3/31
Catches/stumpings	1/–
- Source: Cricinfo, 13 November 2010

Andrew P Walton (born 28 February 1965) is a Rhodesian-born former cricketer. Walton played as a right-handed batsman who bowled right-arm medium pace.

Walton represented the Kent Cricket Board in three List A matches. These came against the Worcestershire Cricket Board, the Warwickshire Cricket Board and Hampshire County Cricket Club, all in the 2000 NatWest Trophy. In his 3 List A matches, he scored 13 runs at a batting average of 4.33, with a high score of eight. With the ball he took four wickets at a bowling average of 22.25, with best figures of 3/31.

In February 2020, he was named in Zimbabwe's squad for the Over-50s Cricket World Cup in South Africa. However, the tournament was cancelled during the third round of matches due to the coronavirus pandemic.
