= Gary Joyce =

English cricketer

Personal information
- Full name: Gary Steven Joyce
- Born: 20 October 1964 (age 62); Frome, Somerset, England
- Batting: Right-handed
- Role: Wicket-keeper

Domestic team information
- Years: Team
- 1999: Kent Cricket Board

Career statistics
Competition	List A
Matches	3
Runs scored	10
Batting average	5.00
100s/50s	0/0
Top score	6
Catches/stumpings	4/–
- Source: Cricinfo, 13 November 2010

Gary Steven Joyce (born 20 October 1964) is a former English cricketer. Joyce was a right-handed batsman who played primarily as a wicket-keeper. He was born at Frome, Somerset.

Joyce represented the Kent Cricket Board in three List A matches. These came against Denmark, the Worcestershire Cricket Board and Hampshire County Cricket Club, all in the 1999 NatWest Trophy. In his 3 List A matches, he scored 10 runs at a batting average of 5.00, with a high score of 6. Behind the stumps he took 4 catches.
