= George Thomas Marks =

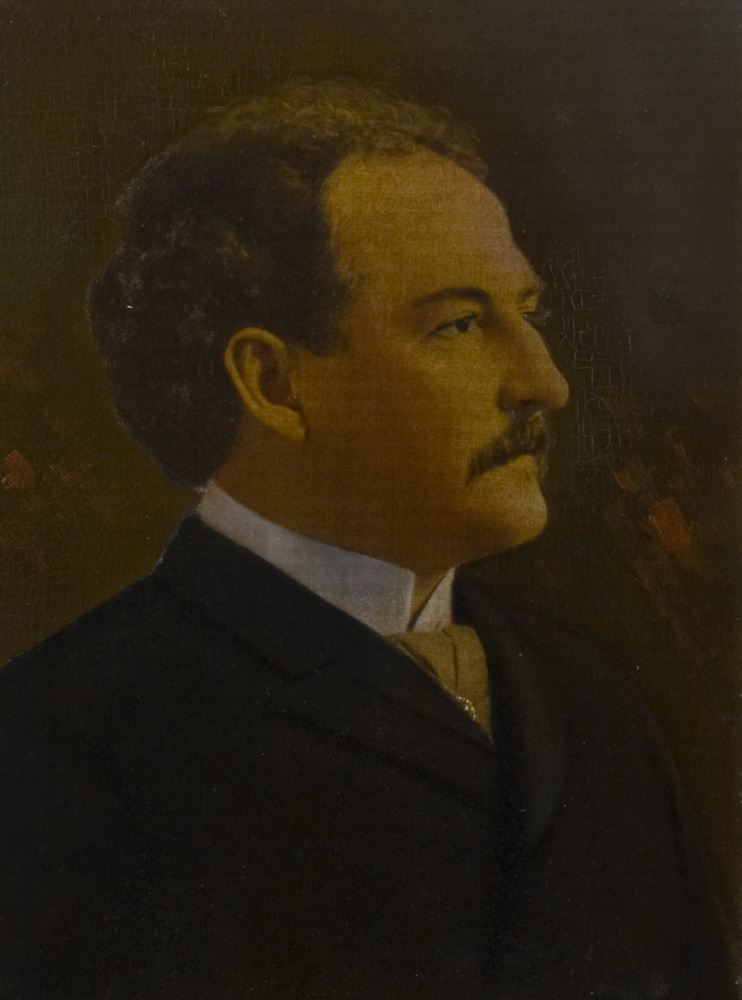
Marks in 1899

George Thomas Marks (August 31, 1856 – May 21, 1907) was a businessman and politician in Ontario, Canada. He was mayor of Port Arthur, Ontario (later Thunder Bay) from 1893 to 1899.

He was born in Bruce Mines, Canada West, the son of George Marks and Mary Traynor, and was educated at Trinity College School in Port Hope. In 1873, he settled in Prince Arthur's Landing (later Port Arthur). He worked in various companies owned by his uncle Thomas Marks, before becoming a partner in Thomas Marks and Company in 1884. Marks was married twice: to Jennie Laird in 1881 and to Mary Elizabeth Rowan in 1898. Marks was treasurer and councillor for Shuniah and then served on Port Arthur town council from 1885 to 1887. He established a municipal electric-lighting plant and helped consolidate town debt associated with earlier public works projects. He also supported a power generation plan for the Kaministiquia River and helped promote the Ontario and Rainy River Railway. In 1894, he became a partner in the St Lawrence and Chicago Steam Navigation Company and in 1903, with others, formed the Canadian North West Steamship Company and Neebing Navigation Limited. He was also vice-president of the Dominion Marine Association. He was defeated when he ran for reelection as mayor in 1900. Marks ran unsuccessfully for a seat in the House of Commons in 1904. He was one of the earliest proponents for amalgamation of Port Arthur and Fort William. Marks died in Toronto at the age of 50.
