= Matthew Bennett (cricketer) =

English cricketer

Personal information
- Full name: Matthew Robert Martin Bennett
- Born: 2 September 1982 (age 44); Epsom, Surrey, England
- Batting: Right-handed
- Role: Wicketkeeper

Domestic team information
- Years: Team
- 2002–2003: Kent Cricket Board

Career statistics
Competition	List A
Matches	2
Runs scored	41
Batting average	41.00
100s/50s	–/–
Top score	31
Balls bowled	–
Wickets	–
Bowling average	–
5 wickets in innings	–
10 wickets in match	–
Best bowling	–
Catches/stumpings	–/2
- Source: Cricinfo, 12 November 2010

Matthew Robert Martin Bennett (born 2 September 1982) is an English cricketer. Bennett is a right-handed batsman who plays primarily as a wicketkeeper. He was born in Epsom, Surrey.

Bennett represented England at under 18 level and played for Kent and Essex at second XI level. He also represented the Kent Cricket Board in 2 List A matches. The first of these came against the Leicestershire Cricket Board in the 2nd round of the 2003 Cheltenham & Gloucester Trophy which was held in 2002. His second and final List A match for the Board came against Derbyshire in the 3rd round of the same competition which was played in 2003. In his 2 List A matches, he scored 41 runs at a batting average of 41.00, with a high score of 31. Behind the stumps he made 2 stumpings.

He currently plays club cricket for Reigate Priory Cricket Club in the Surrey Championship.
