= Lewis Jenkins =

English cricketer

Personal information
- Full name: Lewis James Philip Jenkins
- Born: 15 November 1981 (age 44); Canterbury, Kent, England
- Batting: Right-handed
- Bowling: Slow left-arm orthodox

Domestic team information
- Years: Team
- 2001: Kent Cricket Board

Career statistics
Competition	LA
Matches	4
Runs scored	91
Batting average	91.00
100s/50s	–/1
Top score	50*
Balls bowled	–
Wickets	–
Bowling average	–
5 wickets in innings	–
10 wickets in match	–
Best bowling	–
Catches/stumpings	–/–
- Source: Cricinfo, 13 November 2010

Lewis James Philip Jenkins (born 15 November 1981) is an English cricketer. Jenkins is a right-handed batsman who bowls slow left-arm orthodox. He was born at Canterbury, Kent.

Jenkins represented the Kent Cricket Board in List A cricket. His debut List A match came against the Hampshire Cricket Board in the 2001 Cheltenham & Gloucester Trophy. During the 2001 season, he represented the Board in 4 List A matches, the last of which came against the Leicestershire Cricket Board in the 2nd round of the 2002 Cheltenham & Gloucester Trophy which was played in 2001. In his 4 List A matches, he scored 91 runs at a batting average of 91.00, with a single half century high score of 50*. It was this unbeaten score which gave him such a high average.

He currently plays club cricket for St Lawrence Cricket Club in the Kent Cricket League.
