= E. George Marks =

Australian journalist and author (c. 1885 – 1935)

- Born: Ernest George Marks; 1884 or 1885; Braidwood, New South Wales
- Died: 2 February 1935 (aged 50); Sydney, New South Wales, Australia
- Education: St. Stanislaus College, Bathurst
- Occupations: Journalist and author
- Known for: Campaigning for stronger Australian defence

Ernest George Marks (c. 1885 – 2 February 1935) was an Australian journalist and author who from the 1920s predicted military conflict in the Pacific between Japan and the United States.

Marks was born in New South Wales into a family with French military ancestors, endowing him with a lifelong interest in Napoleonic matters. His journalistic career began in 1903 and he rose to the position of chief court reporter, but became better known for his articles, books, and lectures on military strategy, particularly the risk posed to Australia by Japanese territorial ambitions in the Pacific. His writings on this subject proved prescient but incorporated the racist tropes of the white Australia policy that argued that the "white races" risked being engulfed by an expanding population of Asians.

His pugnacious writing style and strong opinions divided reviewers, with some appreciating his forthright statement of Australia's weak strategic position while others saw him as alarmist and peddling "old scares".

Marks died at the age of 50 after he fell from a tram.

== Early life and family ==
Ernest Marks was born in Braidwood, New South Wales, around 1885, to Mr. and Mrs. G. Marks, of Rockwall Crescent, Potts Point and Centennial Park. He had a sister, Miss Josephine Marks, who became a charity worker. He was educated at the Roman Catholic St. Stanislaus College, Bathurst. His great-grandfather and great-granduncle fought for Napoleon Bonaparte and his father was a soldier for Napoleon III in the Crimean War, leading Ernest to have a life-long admiration for the career of Napoleon Bonaparte.

In 1924, he married Linda Wallis, second daughter of Charles Leicester Wallis, a co-founder of the wool-traders Winchcombe, Carson and Co., and a grandniece of Sir Daniel Cooper. Together they had a daughter, Berenice.

== Journalistic career ==
Marks began his journalist career on The Australian Star in 1903. When it was taken over by Sun Newspapers Limited, he transferred to The Sun of Sydney, where he worked for more than 25 years, lastly as chief law reporter. He was a founding member of the Australian Journalists Association.

== Books ==
In 1915, Marks published Napoleon and the War: First series, a volume of articles on Napoleon originally printed in The Sun in 1914. The same year he lectured before the Australian Historical Society on "Napoleon and the War" with the thesis that true modern democracy had its roots in the overturning of the French monarchical oligarchies by Napoleon. He produced a second volume of collected articles in 1917. His military writings continued in 1918 with How Foch Makes War which examined the career of the great French strategist of the First World War.

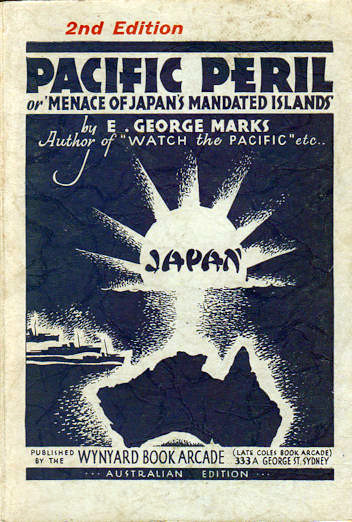
Pacific Peril, or, Menace of Japan's Mandated Islands, 2nd edition, 1933.

Merit and Democracy (1921) was a wide-ranging work of political philosophy, dealing with topics such as the evolution of modern democracy, the sovereignty of the people, and the curse of the demagogue.

In the mid-1920s Marks's interests turned to Australian defence policy and the threat posed by an ambitious Japan which had been on the Allied side during the First World War and was therefore not a defeated power. He produced Watch the Pacific! Defenceless Australia in 1924, a rallying cry for a stronger Australian and British Empire defence posture in which he criticised the results of the Versailles Peace Conference, the Washington Naval Conference, and the weakness of the League of Nations in allowing Japan to increase her military strength in the Pacific. Reviewers in The Coast Artillery Journal and the Journal of the United Service Institution of India were impressed by the forceful way in which Marks laid-out his case for a stronger Australian defence, the former stating that although pacificists would find the book to be jingoistic, it was worth reading.

The left-of-centre Labor Daily found the book to be "old scares revived" and Marks to be an alarmist. Of his claims that conflict between the United States and Japan would be "the first stage of the next world war" and that "inter-marriage with colored races or the introduction of slavery into Australia" would come if Australia did not pay for a proper defence, they were unconvinced, saying that, happily, there was another future for Australia. The book was translated into various Asian languages by the Indian activist and linguist Tarak Nath Das.

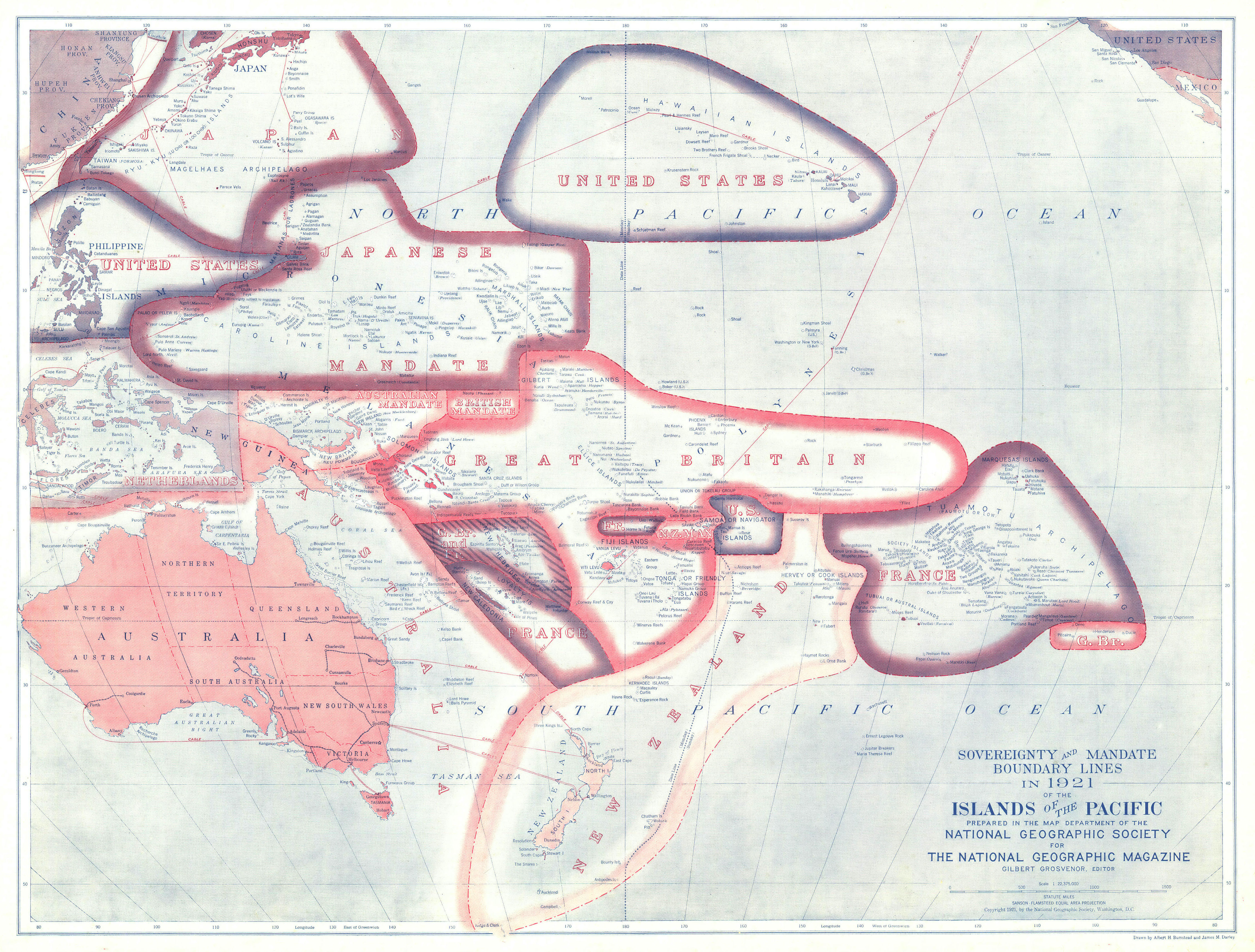
The Japanese Mandate on a 1921 map

He wrote the words to the patriotic song "Dawn of the Capital", to mark the opening of the Parliament House in Canberra in 1927. Marks's paraphrase of the song emphasised the Britishness of Australia and that the country's "great ideal, 'White Australia,' shall forever remain, and that it shall be the nation's true refrain."

In 1928, Marks lectured on "The Menace in the Pacific", and on the same theme in 1930. In 1932, he published Pacific Peril: Menace of Japan's Mandated Islands, a book that predicted a clash between the United States and Japan if the latter country's territorial ambitions, driven according to Marks by massive population growth, were thwarted. The mandated islands of the subtitle were the South Seas Mandate, former German islands south of Japan over which that country had been given control by the League of Nations after the end of the First World War. The book was supported by a series of lectures of the same title numbering 20 by October 1933. The Labor Daily described the book as "pregnant with warnings to the white peoples of the Pacific against Asiatic ambitions" but Ronald Bodley, who had toured the islands at the invitation of the Japanese government and found no militarisation there, described Marks as a "scaremonger" and his book as "foolish".

== Death ==
On 2 February 1935, Marks was thrown from a crowded Sydney tram as it rounded a curve. He suffered a fractured skull when he hit the ground and was admitted to St Vincent's Hospital where he underwent an operation but died later the same day. His address at the time of his death was Agincourt Hall, Roscoe Street, Bondi. He was aged 50. He was interred at Waverley Cemetery, Sydney, at a funeral well attended by members of the journalistic and legal professions and received obituaries in The Sydney Morning Herald and the Catholic Freeman's Journal. He left an estate estimated at £4,000.

== Selected publications ==
- Napoleon and the War: First series. James R. Tyrrell, Sydney, 1915.
- Napoleon and the War: Second series. Dymock's Book Arcade, Sydney, 1917.
- How Foch Makes War. Dymock's Book Arcade, Sydney, 1918.
- Merit and Democracy. Tyrrell's, Sydney, 1921.
- Watch the Pacific! Defenceless Australia. Coles Book Arcade, Sydney, 1924.
- Pacific Peril, or, Menace of Japan's Mandated Islands. Wynyard Book Arcade, Sydney, 1933. (2nd 1933)

== See also ==
- Attack on Pearl Harbor
