= Dartford =

Town in Kent, England

Coordinates: 51°26′40″N 00°13′02″E

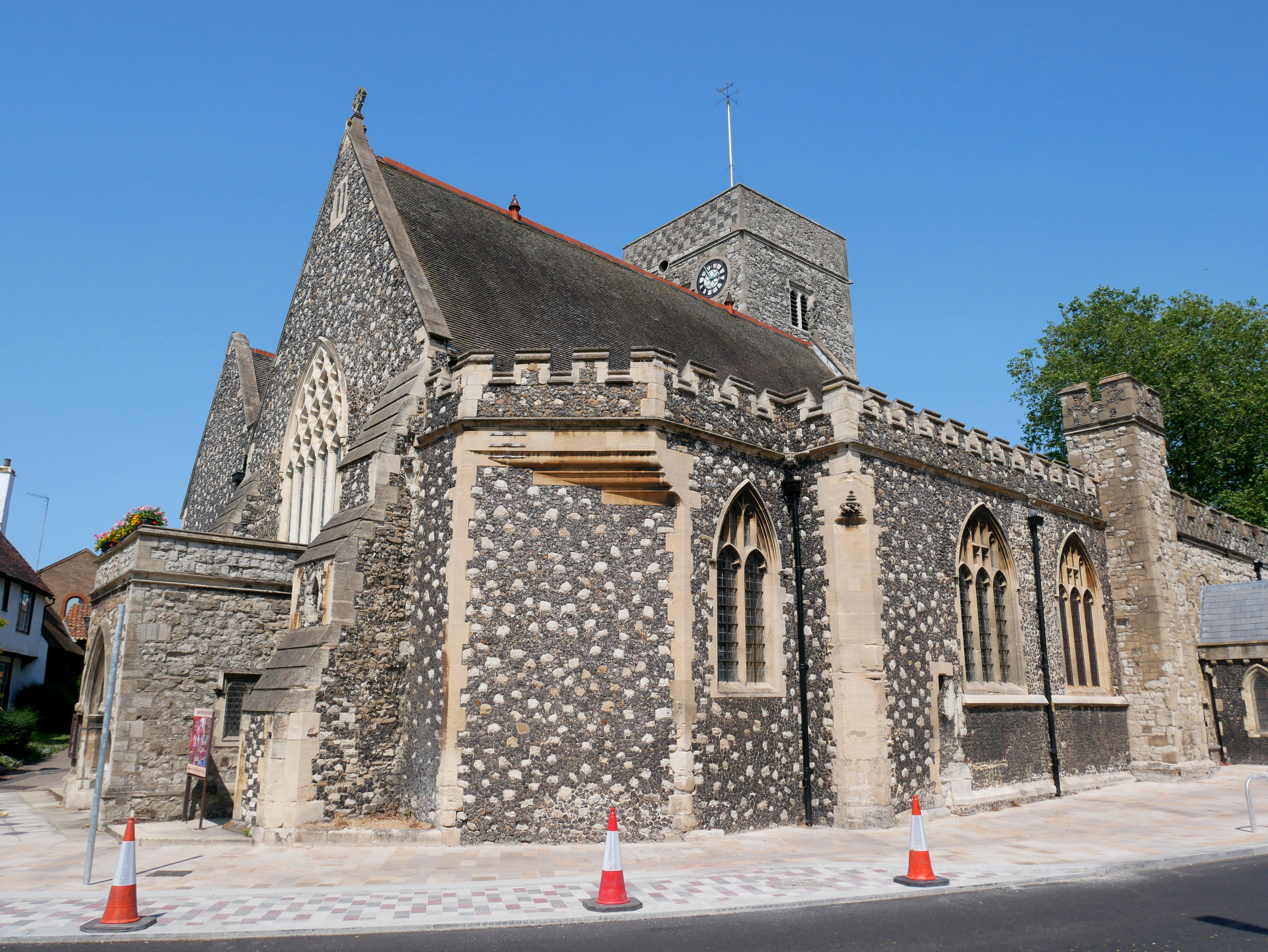
- Holy Trinity Church, Dartford

- Location within Kent
- Population: 54,161 (2021 Census)
- OS grid reference: TQ538739
  - London: 18.8 mi (30.3 km)
- District: Dartford
- Shire county: Kent
- Region: South East
- Country: England
- Sovereign state: United Kingdom
- Post town: DARTFORD
- Postcode district: DA1, DA2
- Dialling code: 01322
- Police: Kent
- Fire: Kent
- Ambulance: South East Coast
- UK Parliament: Dartford

Dartford is the principal town in the Borough of Dartford, Kent, England. It is located 18 mi (29 km) south-east of Central London and is situated adjacent to the London Borough of Bexley to its west. To its north, across the Thames Estuary, is Thurrock in Essex, which can be reached via the Dartford Crossing. To its east lies the Borough of Gravesham and to the south the district of Sevenoaks. It had a population of 54,161 in 2021.

The town centre lies in a valley through which the River Darent flows and where the old road from London to Dover crossed: hence the name, which derives from Darent + ford. Dartford became a market town in medieval times and, although today it is principally a commuter town for Greater London, it has a long history of religious, industrial and cultural importance. It is an important rail hub; the main through-road now by-passes the town itself.

== Geography ==
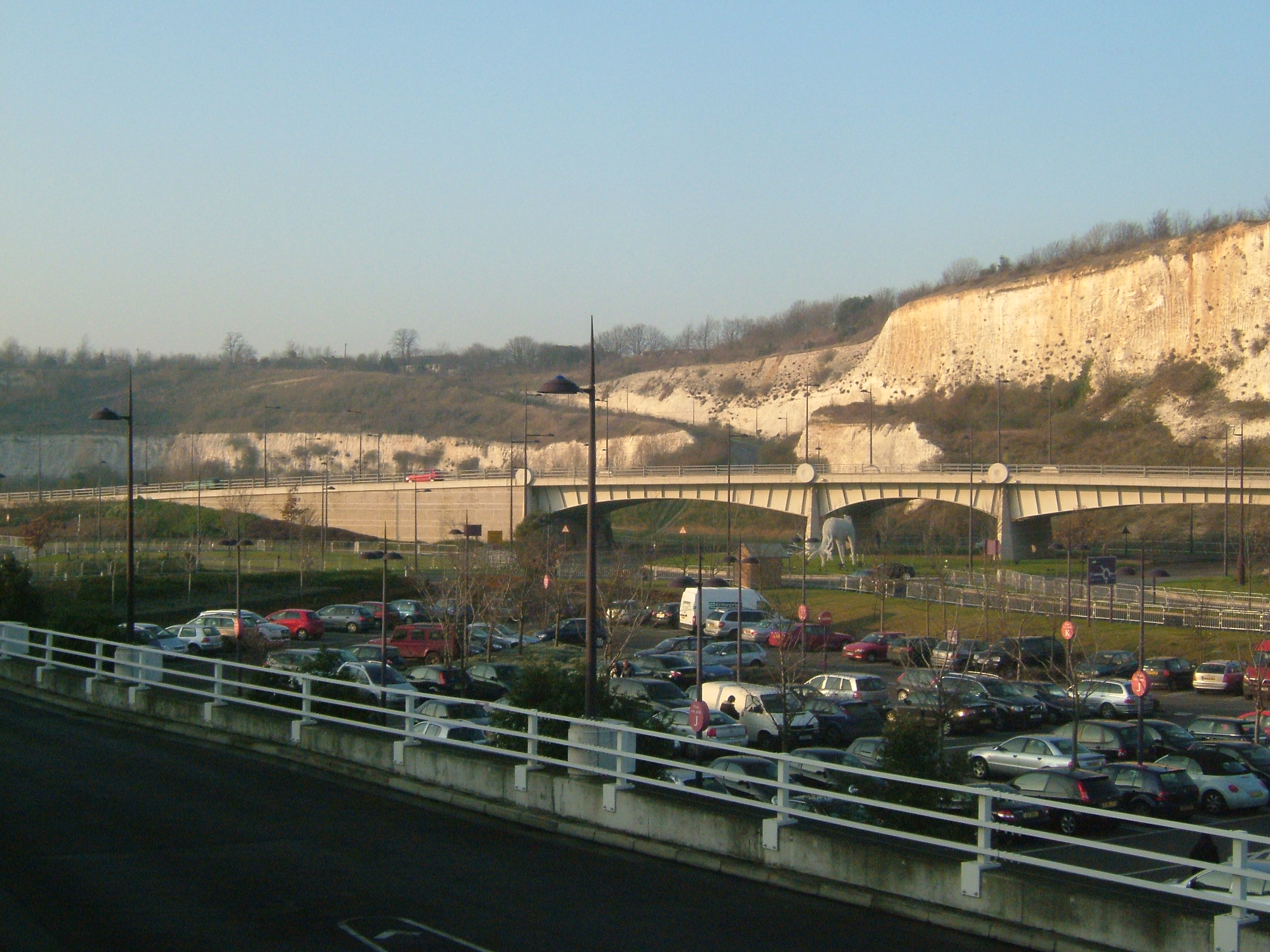
The quarry at Bluewater, showing the underlying chalk

Dartford lies within the area known as the London Basin. The low-lying marsh to the north of the town consists of London Clay and the alluvium brought down by the two rivers—the Darent and the Cray—whose confluence is in this area. The higher land on which the town stands and through which the narrow Darent valley runs, consists of chalk surmounted by the Blackheath Beds of sand and gravel.

As a human settlement, Dartford became established as a river crossing-point with the arrival of the Romans, and as a focal point between two routes: that from west to east being part of the main route connecting London with the Continent, and the southerly route following the Darent valley. As a result, the town's main road pattern makes the shape of letter 'T'. The Dartford Marshes to the north and the proximity of Crayford in the London Borough of Bexley to the west, mean that the town's growth is to the south and east. Wilmington is contiguous with the town to the south, whilst the almost continuous Thames Gateway development means that there is little to mark the town boundary to the east.

Within the town boundaries there are several distinct areas: the town centre around the parish church and along the High Street; the Joyce Green area; Temple Hill estate constructed in 1947; the Brent; Fleet Downs; as well as two important areas of open space and several industrial estates. The open spaces are Central Park, alongside the river; and Dartford Heath.

=== Climate ===
Like most of the United Kingdom, Dartford has an oceanic climate.

Climate data for Dartford
Month	Jan	Feb	Mar	Apr	May	Jun	Jul	Aug	Sep	Oct	Nov	Dec	Year
Mean daily maximum °C (°F)	6.7 (44.1)	7.1 (44.8)	9.9 (49.8)	12.6 (54.7)	16.3 (61.3)	19.6 (67.3)	21.7 (71.1)	21.4 (70.5)	18.8 (65.8)	15.0 (59.0)	10.1 (50.2)	7.7 (45.9)	13.9 (57.0)
Mean daily minimum °C (°F)	0.4 (32.7)	0.5 (32.9)	1.5 (34.7)	3.4 (38.1)	6.3 (43.3)	9.3 (48.7)	11.3 (52.3)	10.9 (51.6)	8.8 (47.8)	6.4 (43.5)	2.8 (37.0)	1.3 (34.3)	5.2 (41.4)
Average precipitation mm (inches)	79 (3.1)	51 (2.0)	61 (2.4)	53 (2.1)	56 (2.2)	56 (2.2)	46 (1.8)	56 (2.2)	69 (2.7)	74 (2.9)	76 (3.0)	79 (3.1)	750 (29.7)

== History ==
In prehistoric times, the first people appeared in the Dartford area around 250,000 years ago: a tribe of prehistoric hunter-gatherers whose exemplar is called Swanscombe Man. Many other archaeological investigations have revealed a good picture of occupation of the district with important finds from the Stone Age, the Bronze Age and the Iron Age.

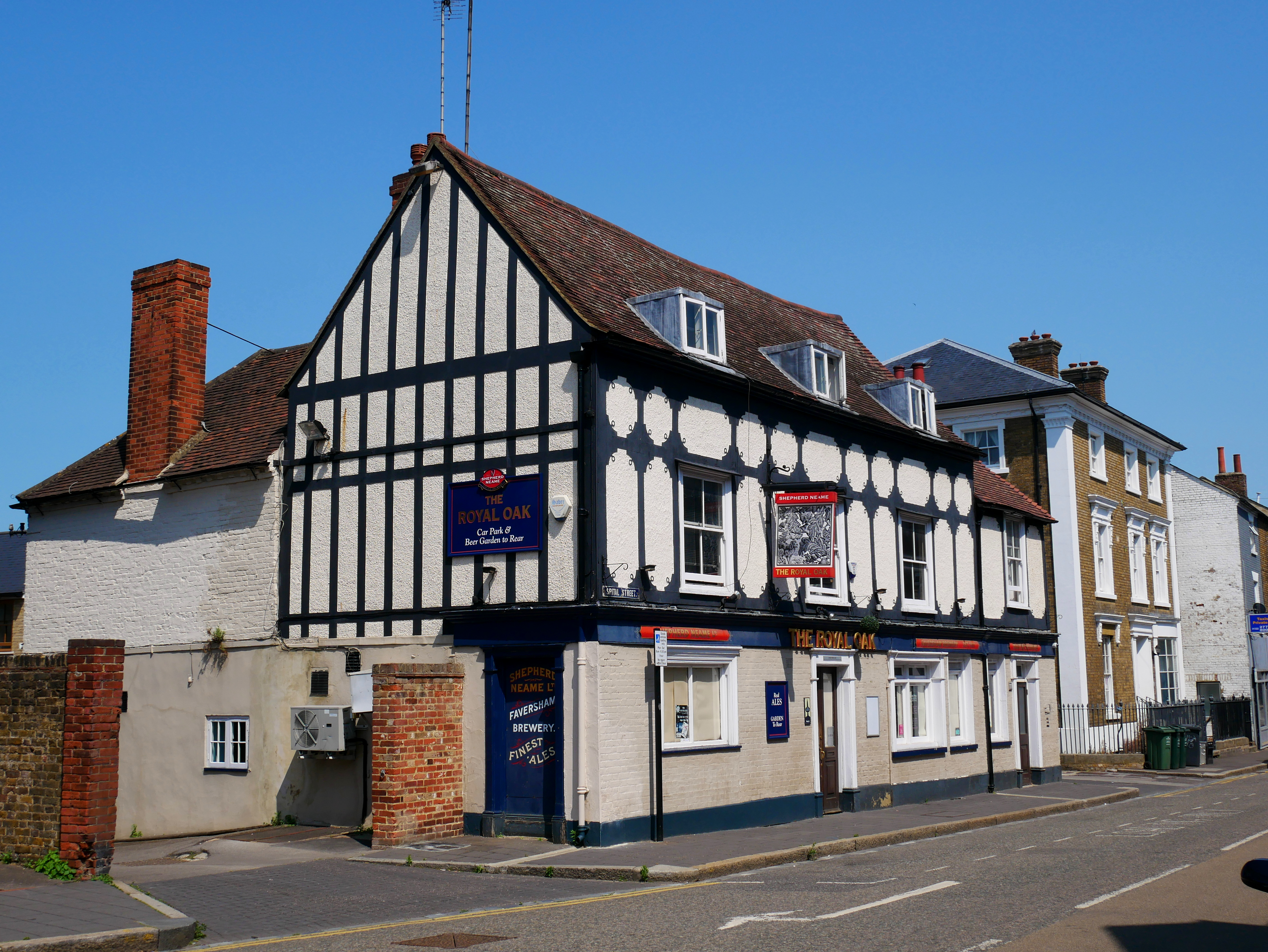
The Royal Oak Pub, which has seventeenth-century origins, in Dartford

When the Romans engineered the Dover to London road (afterwards named Watling Street), it was necessary to cross the River Darent by ford, giving the settlement its name. Roman villas were built along the Darent Valley, and at Noviomagus (Crayford), close by. The Saxons may have established the first settlement where Dartford now stands. Dartford manor is mentioned in the Domesday Book, compiled in 1086, after the Norman conquest. It was then owned by the king.

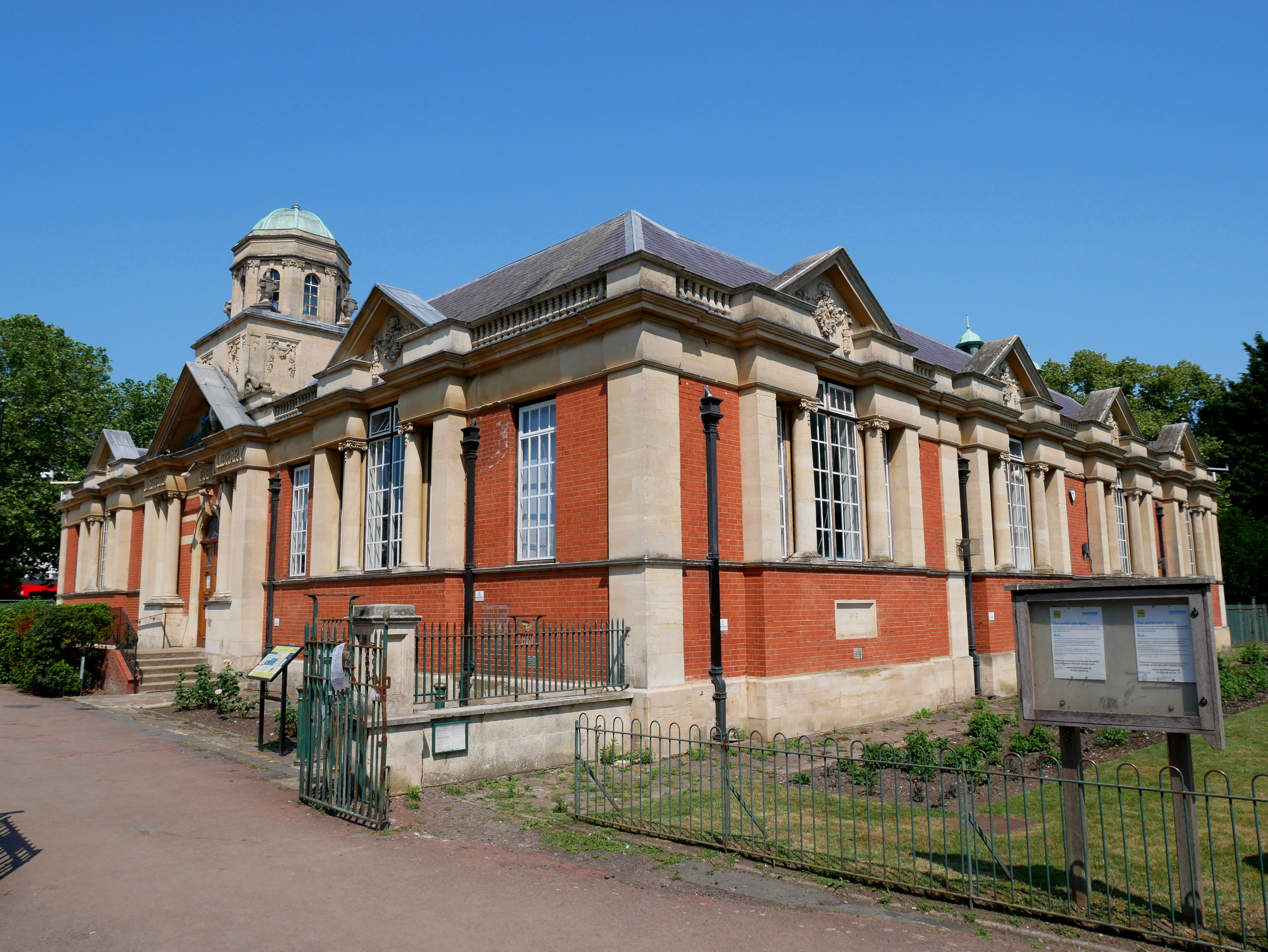
The Library and Museum in front

During the medieval period Dartford was an important waypoint for pilgrims and travellers en route to Canterbury and the Continent, and various religious orders established themselves in the area. In the 12th century the Knights Templar had possession of the manor of Dartford; the National Trust property at Sutton-at-Hone, to the south of the town, is a remaining piece of that history. In the 14th century, a priory was established here, and two groups of friars—the Dominicans and the Franciscans—built hospitals here for the care of the sick. At this time the town became a small but important market town.

Wat Tyler, a key figure in the Peasants' Revolt, may have been from Dartford, though three other towns in Kent also claim him, and there are some doubts about the strength of Tyler's connection to Dartford. It is, however, probable that Dartford was a key meeting point early in the Peasants' Revolt, with a detachment of Essex rebels marching south to join Kentish rebels at Dartford before accompanying them to Rochester and Canterbury in the first week of June 1381. Although lacking a leader, Kentishmen had assembled at Dartford around 5 June through a sense of county solidarity at the mistreatment of Robert Belling, a man claimed as a serf by Sir Simon Burley. Burley had abused his royal court connections to invoke the arrest of Belling and, despite a compromise being proposed by bailiffs in Gravesend, continued to demand the impossible £300 of silver for Belling's release. Having left for Rochester and Canterbury on 5 June, the rebels passed back through Dartford in greater numbers on 12 June on their way to London.

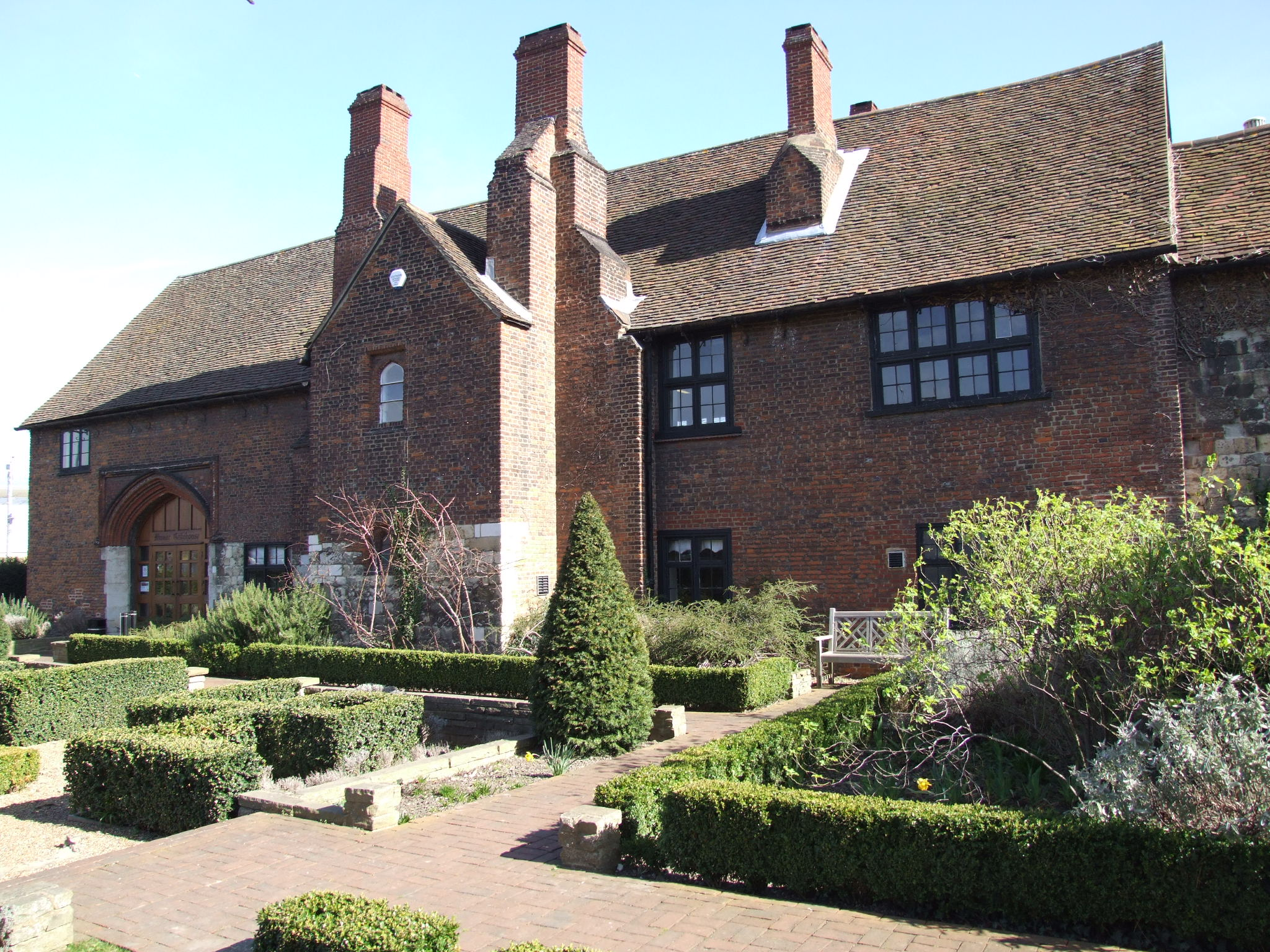
The gatehouse of Henry VIII's Royal Manor

In the 15th century, two kings of England became part of the town's history. Henry V marched through Dartford in November 1415 with his troops after fighting the French at the Battle of Agincourt; in 1422 Henry's body was taken to Holy Trinity Church by Edmund Lacey, Bishop of Exeter, who conducted a funeral. In March 1452, Richard, Duke of York, camped at the Brent allegedly with ten thousand men, waiting for a confrontation with King Henry VI. The Duke surrendered to the king in Dartford. The place of the camp is marked today by York Road, Dartford.

The 16th century saw significant changes to the hitherto agrarian basis of the market in Dartford, as new industries began to take shape (see below). The priory was destroyed in 1538 during the Dissolution of the Monasteries and a new manor house was subsequently constructed by King Henry VIII. In 1545, Henry held a series of meetings of his Privy Council in the town, and from 21 to 25 June 1545 Dartford was the seat of the national government. Henry's fourth wife Anne of Cleves lived at the new priory for four years before her death in 1557.

Many Protestants were executed during the reigns of Queen Mary (1553–1554) and Philip and Mary (1554–1558), including Christopher Wade, a Dartford linen-weaver who was burnt at the stake on the Brent in 1555. The Martyrs' Memorial on East Hill commemorates Wade and other Kentish Martyrs. In 1576 Dartford Grammar School was founded, part of the Tudor emphasis on education for ordinary people.

=== Industrial history ===
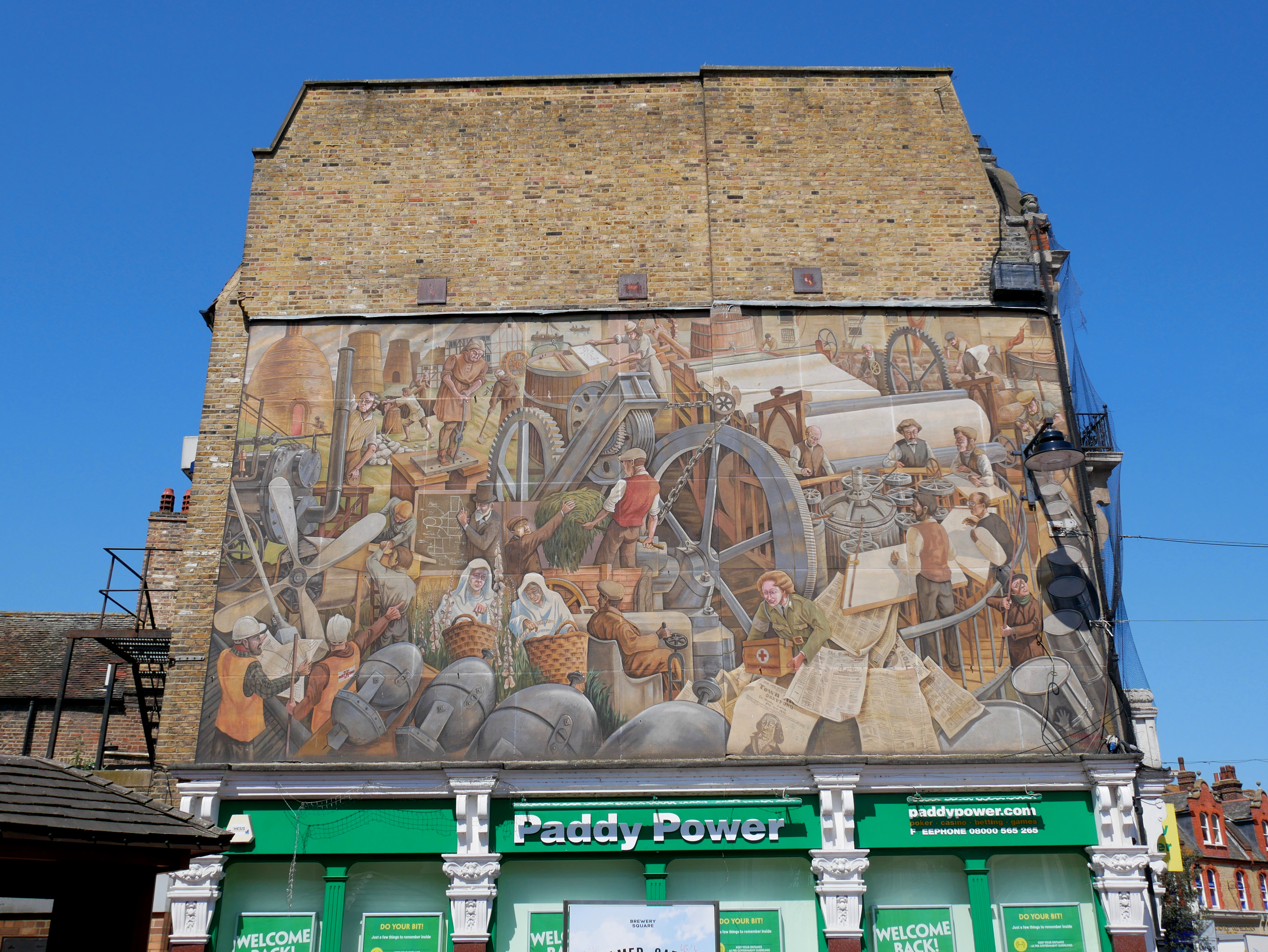
Mural depicting Dartford's industrial heritage painted at One Bell Corner. The mural was designed and painted in 2000 by artist Gary Drostle.

The earliest industries were those connected with agriculture, such as the brewing of traditional beers and ales. Lime-burning and chalk-mining also had their place. Fulling was another: the cleansing of wool needed a great deal of water, which the river could provide. This led to other water-based industries, using hydropower to operate machinery.

Upon his return in 1578 from Frobisher Bay in the Canadian Arctic with a reputed cargo of gold-bearing ore, Sir Martin Frobisher had the refining done on Powder Mill Lane in Dartford. Assiduous efforts to extract gold were made over five years, but the ore proved to be a valueless rock containing hornblende and was eventually salvaged for road metalling and wall construction. Sir John Spielman set up the first paper mill in England at Dartford in 1588 on a site near Powder Mill Lane, and soon some 600 employees worked there, providing an invaluable source of local employment. Iron-making on the Weald was in full operation at this time, and iron ingots were sent to Dartford, to England's first iron-slitting mill, set up by the Darent at Dartford Creek in 1595 by Godfrey Box, an immigrant from the Low Countries. In 1785, John Hall, a millwright set up a workshop in Lowfield Street and began to make engines, boilers and machinery (some of it for the local gunpowder factory run by Miles Peter Andrews and the Pigou family), marking the foundation of J & E Hall, an engineering firm specialising in heavy engineering, and later refrigerating equipment, and, for 20 years from 1906, vehicle production, plus lifts and escalators.

From those humble beginnings in the 18th century was to come the industrial base on which the growth and prosperity of Dartford were founded. In 1840 the mustard factory of Saunders & Harrison was described as being "perhaps the largest in the kingdom". Dartford Paper Mills were built in 1862, when excise duty on paper was abolished. Between 1844 and 1939 the fabric printing works of Augustus Applegath were in being in Bullace Lane: again a firm using the waters of the river. RAF Joyce Green, at Long Reach, near Dartford was one of the first Royal Flying Corps airfields, It was established in 1911 by Vickers Limited (the aircraft and weapons manufacturer, who used it as an airfield and testing ground. It was superseded by Biggin Hill, and closed in 1919. The demand created by World War I meant that output at the local Vickers factory multiplied, with a positive effect on the local economy. Burroughs-Wellcome chemical works (later incorporated into GlaxoSmithKline) made Dartford a centre for the pharmaceutical industry. There had been a large power station at Littlebrook on the Thames, to the north of the town, from 1939 until its closure in 2015. The station, including one of the tallest chimneys in the UK, was completely demolished in 2019.

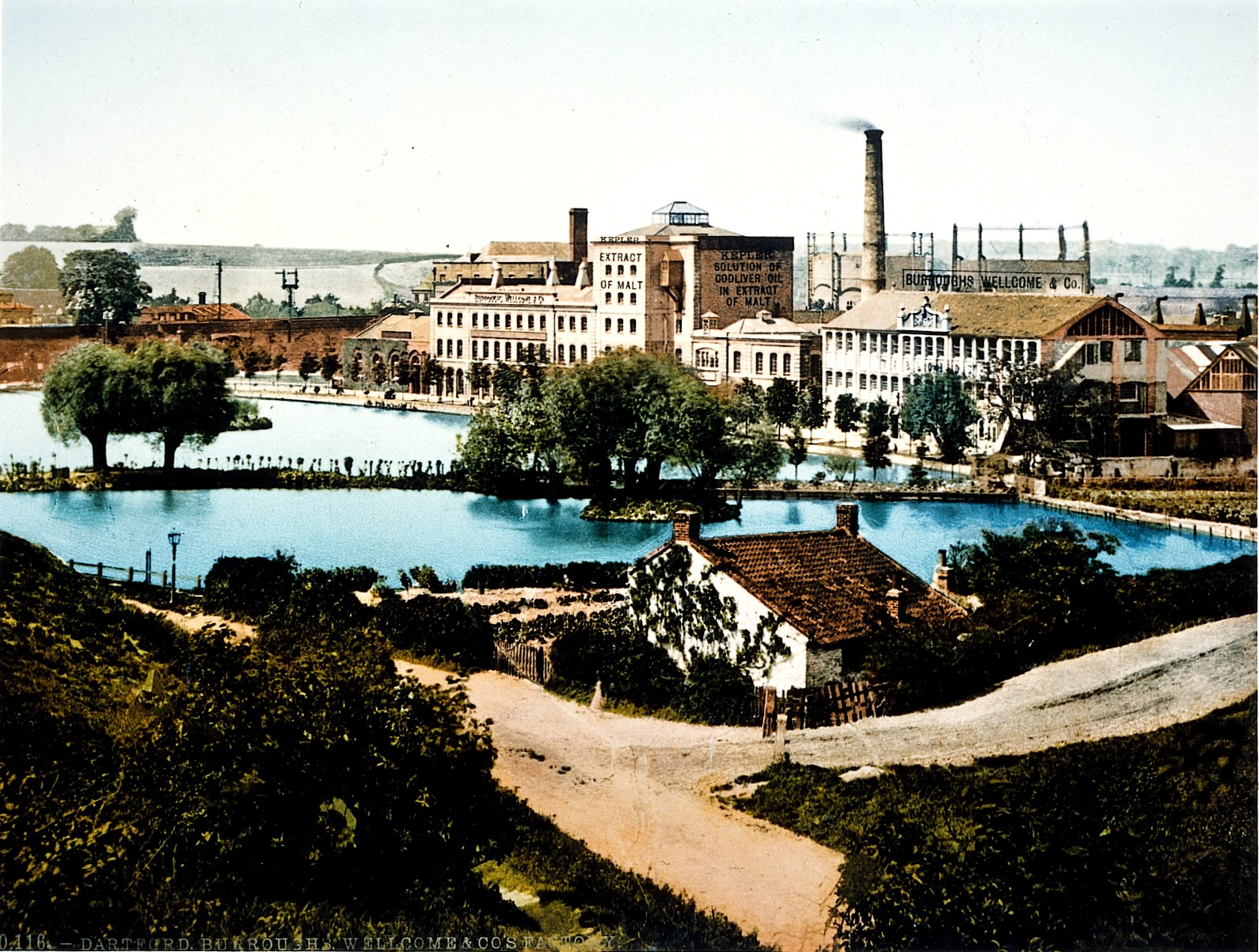
The Chemical Works at Dartford c. 1896

=== Post-industrial economic plans ===
The Mazda motor manufacturer has its UK head office at the large Thames-side Crossways Business Park. Thomas Walter Jennings created the Vox musical brand, with products such as the AC15 and AC30 amplifiers originating in Dartford. In early 2006, the since-closed South East England Development Agency (SEEDA) purchased the former Unwins depot on the edge of the town. The warehouse was demolished and a business centre, The Base, built in its place, funded by the Homes and Communities Agency.

By 2018, the former GlaxoSmithKline manufacturing site in Mill Pond Road had been redeveloped with residential apartments and is known as Langley Square. Further regeneration is taking place at Market Street, to be known as Brewery Square.

== Economy ==
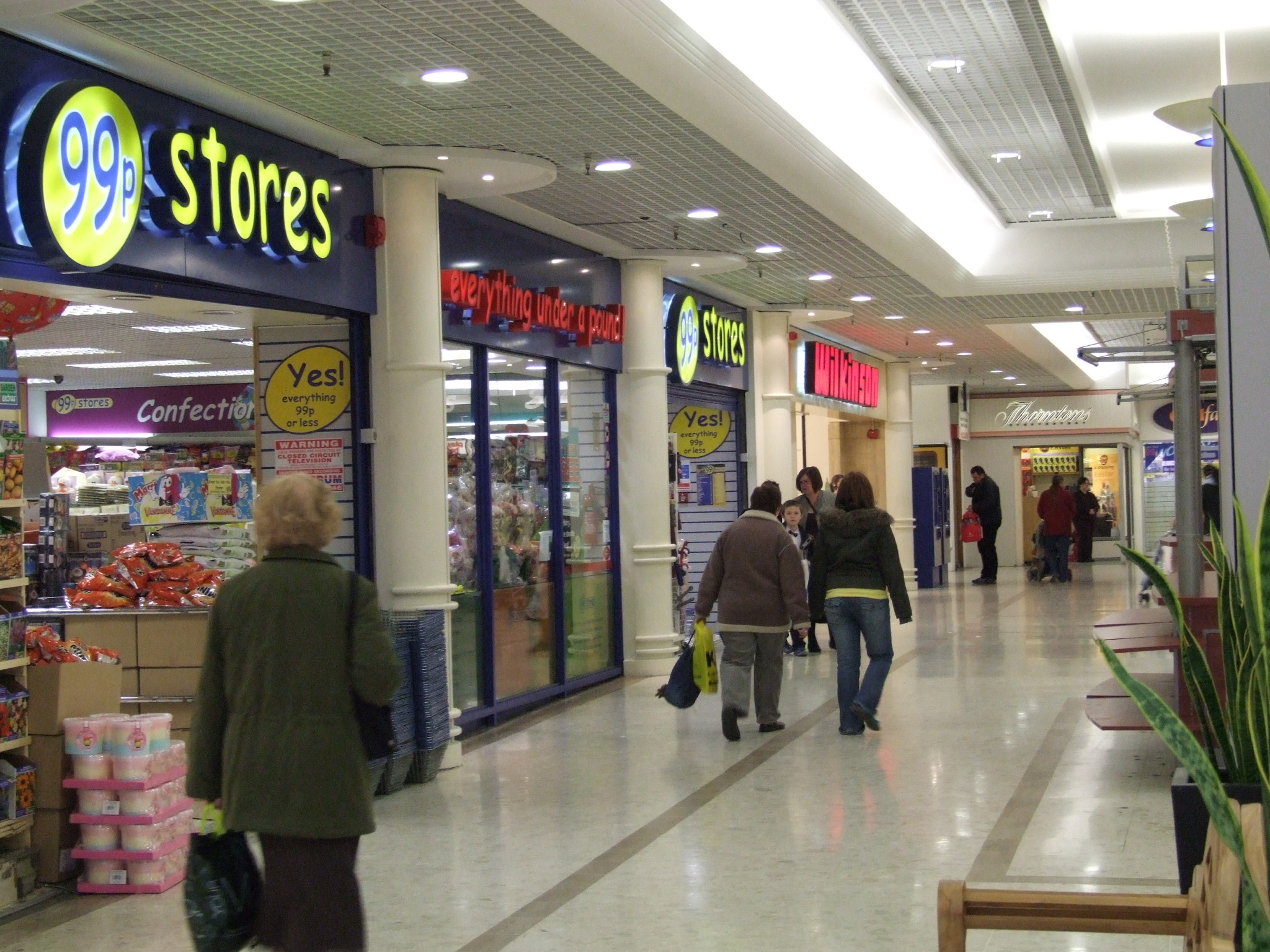
Low cost shopping units in the Priory shopping centre

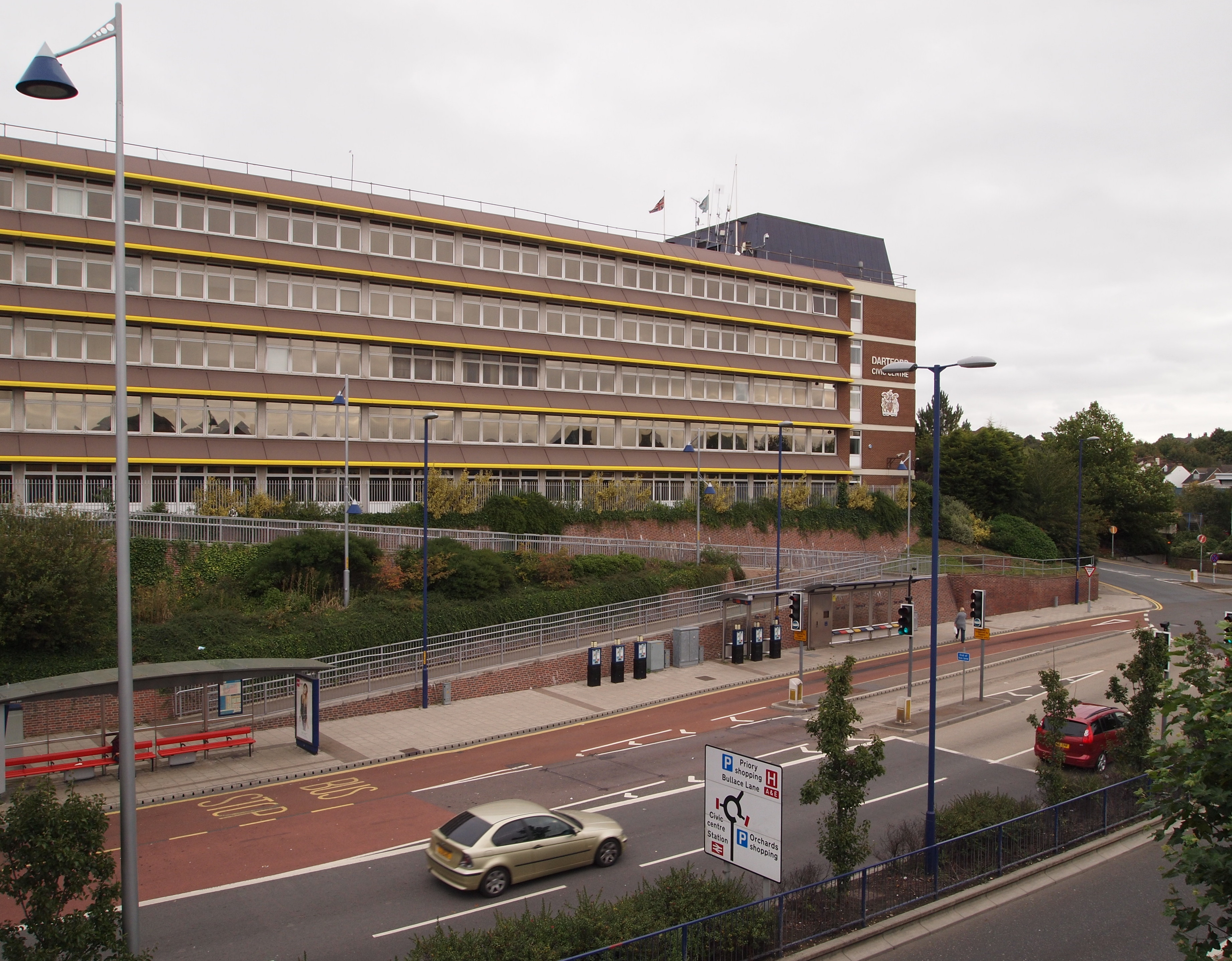
Dartford Civic Centre

Some of Dartford's key industries, including brewing, paper-making, flour milling and the manufacture of cement, suffered extreme decline in the 20th century, causing redundancies and unemployment. Western Quarry (now redeveloped into Bluewater shopping centre) was closed by Blue Circle in 1990. This industry had been an economic boon to the area, but left behind a lot of derelict land and pollution. In 1990 Dartford contained around 1,700 acres (6.9 km^{2}) of spoiled land resulting from extractive industries, and cement-dust pollution from local cement works was a regular subject of complaint in the local press throughout the 20th century.

The closure of Dartford's major employers (including Seagers' Engineering Works, J & E Hall International, and Vickers), the reduction and subsequent closure of Burroughs Wellcome (now GlaxoSmithKline), the redevelopment of nearby Bexleyheath as a shopping town in the 1970s, and the opening of Bluewater Shopping Centre in 1999, all had a negative effect on the economy of Dartford, but the town is still home to major brands such as Sainsbury's, TGJones, and Boots. With the opening of the major Bluewater regional shopping centre just outside the town, the high street has seen a growth in cheaper brands such as Primark and Wilko taking over empty premises. Wilko announced in 2023 that it was going into receivership. In the 1990s, the local economy was boosted by the establishment of a number of business parks in the area, the biggest being Crossways Business Park at the foot of the Queen Elizabeth II Bridge. The former offices of Hall-Thermotank have been converted for use as Dartford Civic Centre.

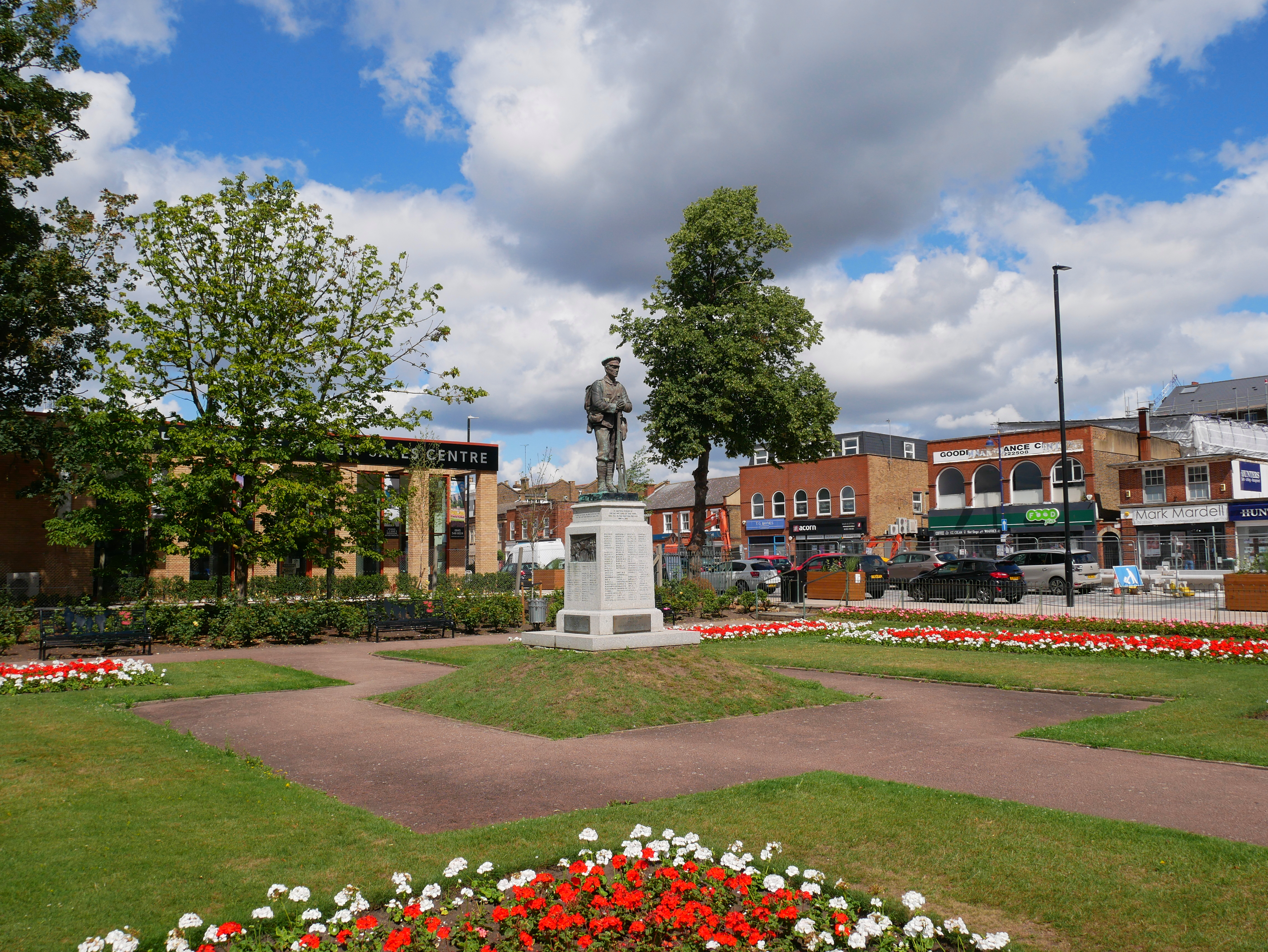
The twentieth-century war memorial in Dartford

In 2007 Dartford saw an increase in the number of chain stores located in the town as B&Q, M&S Simply Food, TK Maxx and Asda Living opened new outlet stores in the town centre. Before this Safeway had taken part in the development of Dartford's second shopping centre, The Orchards, located next to the Orchard Theatre. The Safeway's site was eventually taken over by Waitrose but this closed in March 2014 and a new Aldi store opened in June 2015. The historical and once bustling main High Street and adjacent shopping centre, The Priory, continued to decline, and went into receivership in 2013, and the large department store previously occupied by the Co-operative has now been demolished, having been bought by Dartford Borough Council. The oldest independent business still trading in Dartford, the butchers Richardson & Sons in Lowfield Street, established in 1908, closed down in 2014 to make way for the proposed Lowfield centre superstore development. The problems with obtaining planning permission for this development and associated residential units were compounded by the recession. This created persistent delay in regeneration of the Lowfield Street site, and on 8 January 2015 it was finally announced that the Tesco plans were to be abandoned.

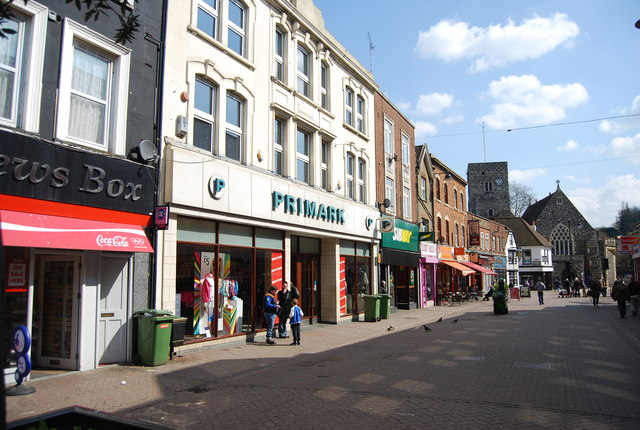
The Primark shop facing the High Street

On 3 January 2026, Primark closed its store in The Orchards Shopping Centre, attributed to extensive repair costs deemed unviable given nearby larger Primark branches.

== Culture and community ==
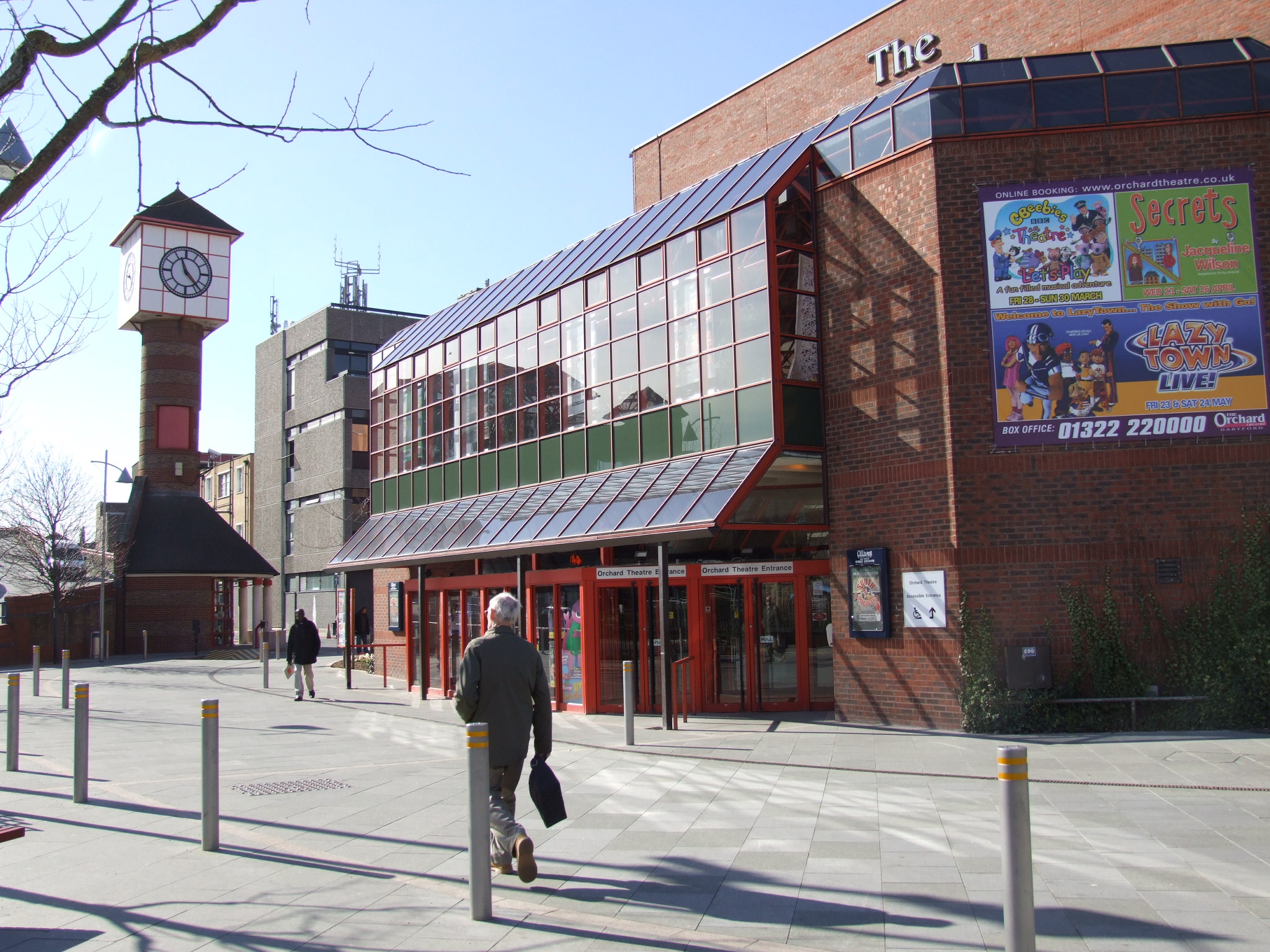
The Orchard Theatre

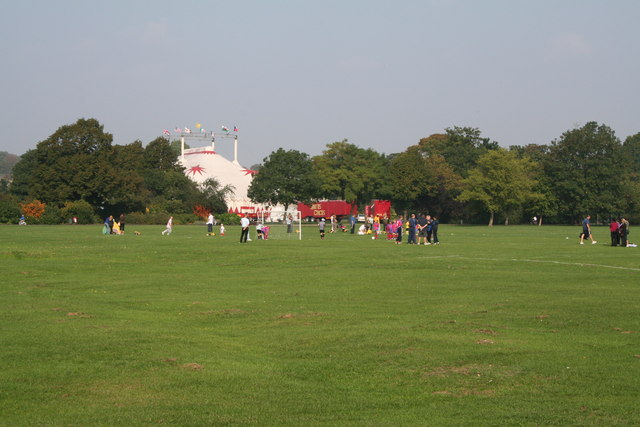
Central Park

The Orchard Theatre is a professional theatre in the town centre, with a schedule including drama, dance, music and entertainment. The Mick Jagger Centre, within the grounds of Dartford Grammar School on Shepherds Lane, was completed in 2000 and provides facilities for community arts. library and Museum are located on Market Street.

Central Park, in the town centre, is used for various community events. It comprises 26 acres (110,000 m^{2}) of land.

=== Sport ===
Dartford F.C. play at Princes Park Stadium and compete in the Isthmian League. There are also three other senior clubs based in Dartford, two of them in the Kent County Football League: Fleetdown United, who play at Heath Lane Lower, and Kent United, who play at Glentworth Sports Club, the former home of Kent Football United (now defunct). Southern Counties East Football League side Halls AFC play at the Community Stadium at Princes Park.

Dartford Harriers Athletic Club was formed in 1922 and is currently based at Central Park. Originally founded as Dartford Rugby Football Club, the rugby players began taking part in cross-country runs in an effort to keep fit. Running soon became more popular with the players, and the club eventually dropped rugby around the end of the 1927–28 season, becoming Dartford Harriers AC. The club's running colours of blue and blue "hoops" are a legacy from the club's rugby origins, when the rugby players simply removed the sleeves from their old rugby shirts to create running vests.

Dartfordians Rugby Football Club have five adult teams and a large youth section, and play their home matches at War Memorial Club House on Bourne Road. Their first team currently plays in London 1 South, following promotion from London 2 South-East in the 2017–18 season.

Dartford is also home to Dartford and White Oak Triathlon Club; formed in 1988, it is one of the oldest British Triathlon Federation clubs in the UK. The club trains at The Bridge Estate, Dartford.

Sports centres in Dartford include the Becket Sports Centre, within the grounds of Dartford Grammar School on Shepherds Lane, which is the home of several sports groups.

=== Media ===
Since the town is close to London, television signals are received from the Crystal Palace TV transmitter, placing Dartford in the BBC London and ITV London areas. Some areas of the town can also pick up a signal from the Bluebell Hill TV transmitter that broadcasts BBC South East and ITV Meridian.

Local radio stations are: BBC Radio Kent (96.7 FM), Heart South (103.1 FM), Gold (603 AM) and KMFM West Kent, which broadcasts from its studios in Strood on 96.2 FM.

The town is served by two local newspapers: the Dartford & Swanley News Shopper and the Dartford Messenger.

=== Health ===
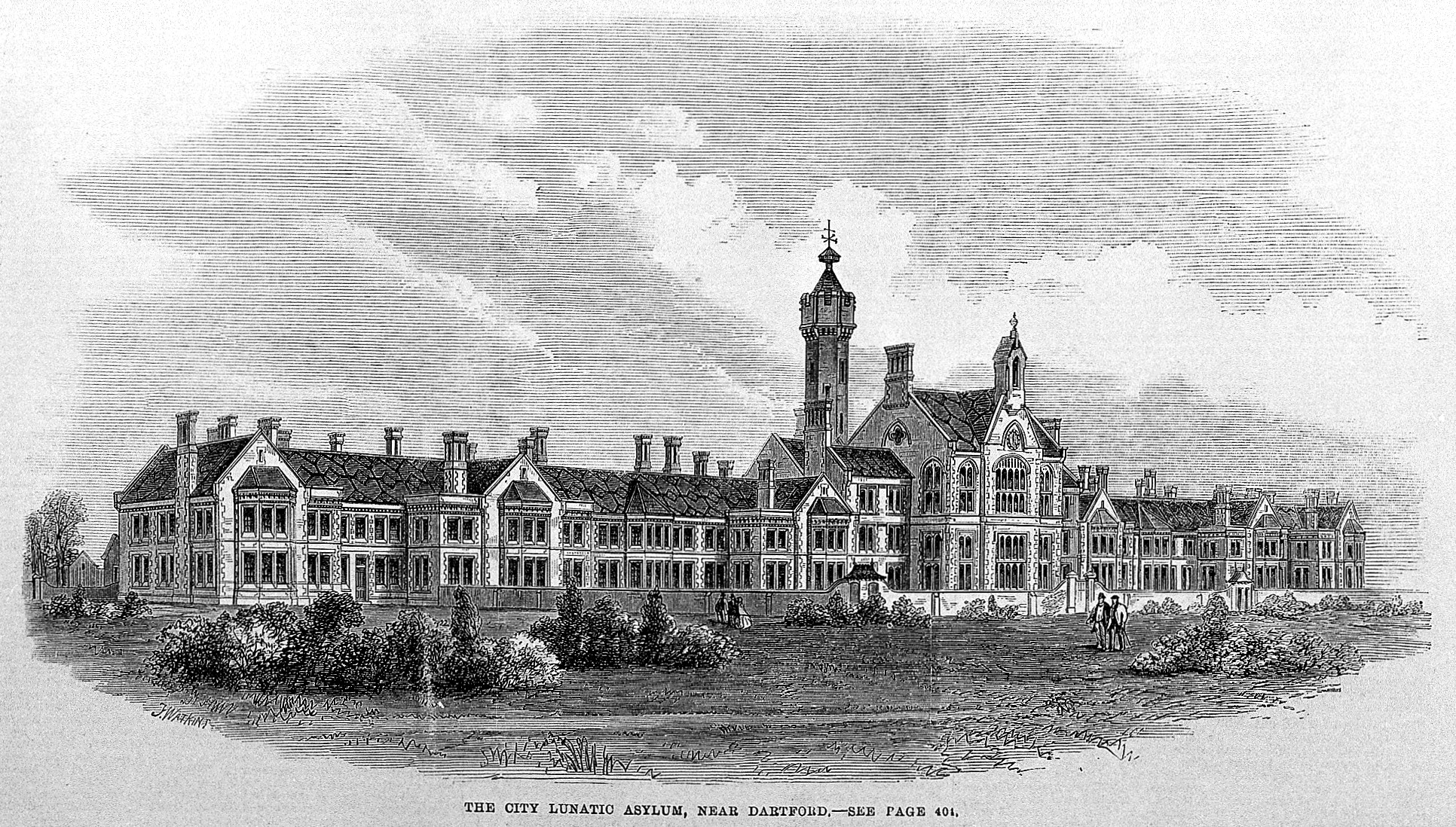
The City of London Lunatic Asylum in 1866

Between 1877 and 1903 the number of hospitals in Dartford rose to 11, together providing 10,000 hospital beds, at a time when the town's population was a little over 20,000. The majority of these have been closed, especially since the opening of Darent Valley Hospital. One of the best-known, Stone House Hospital, in Cotton Lane to the east of the town, was opened on 16 April 1866 as the "City of London Lunatic Asylum". It was, and still is, a large castellated structure built in spacious grounds. It remained under the direct administration of the City of London until 1948, when it was transferred to the National Health Service (NHS). It remains one of the largest and most visible structures in Dartford, and was until recently operated by the NHS to manage regional health care delivery, and was also home to a nursing school, Livingstone Hospital, on East Hill. The main buildings of this facility are now closed, and have been turned into luxury flats.

== Transport ==
=== Roads ===
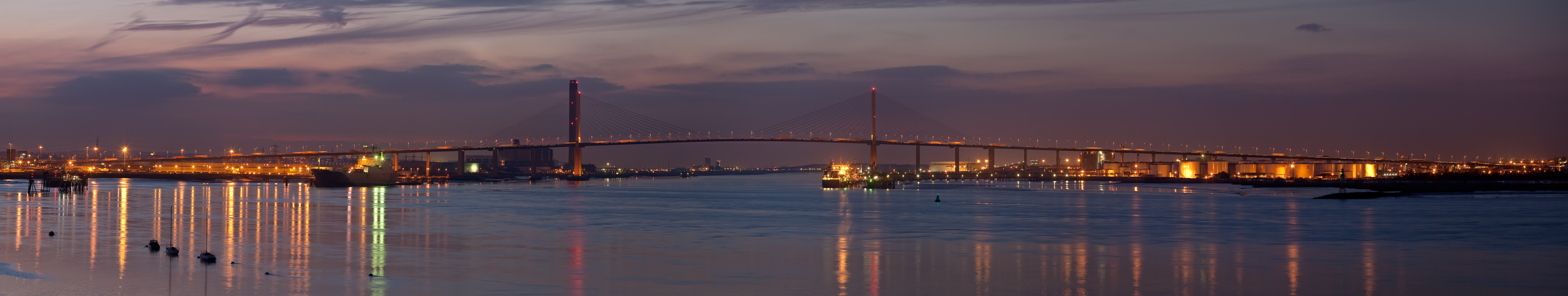
The Queen Elizabeth II Bridge forms the southbound lane of the Dartford Crossing from Essex to Kent

The route of an ancient Celtic trackway which the Romans later paved and identified as Iter III on the Antonine Itinerary, later to be called Watling Street, and which the current A2 roughly follows, passed close to the town. After the Romans left Britain, it fell out of use, as the town developed and traffic went into the town itself; the name Watling Street transferring to the new route. The introduction of stagecoach services increased the amount of traffic through the town, so that by the 18th century it had become necessary to control the upkeep of such a heavily used road. Turnpike Trusts were set up by Act of Parliament; Dartford was served by two: that for Watling Street and the road south to Sevenoaks, both brought into being between 1750 and 1780.

From 1925, the A2 main road took traffic away from Dartford town centre via the Princes Road bypass. Today, the original main road through the town is the A226 and the former turnpike road south to Sevenoaks is now the A225. A newer by-pass is the A206, which skirts the town to the north. Its prime purpose is to carry traffic from the riverside industrial developments on to the Dartford Crossing from both west and east. Dartford is perhaps most well known for the latter, the main mode of crossing the River Thames to the east of London, where the southbound A282 (part of the London Orbital) crosses the river via the Queen Elizabeth II Bridge toll bridge, opened in 1991. The northbound carriageway crosses via the twin bore Dartford Tunnel; the first tunnel was opened in 1963 and the second in 1980.

=== Railway ===
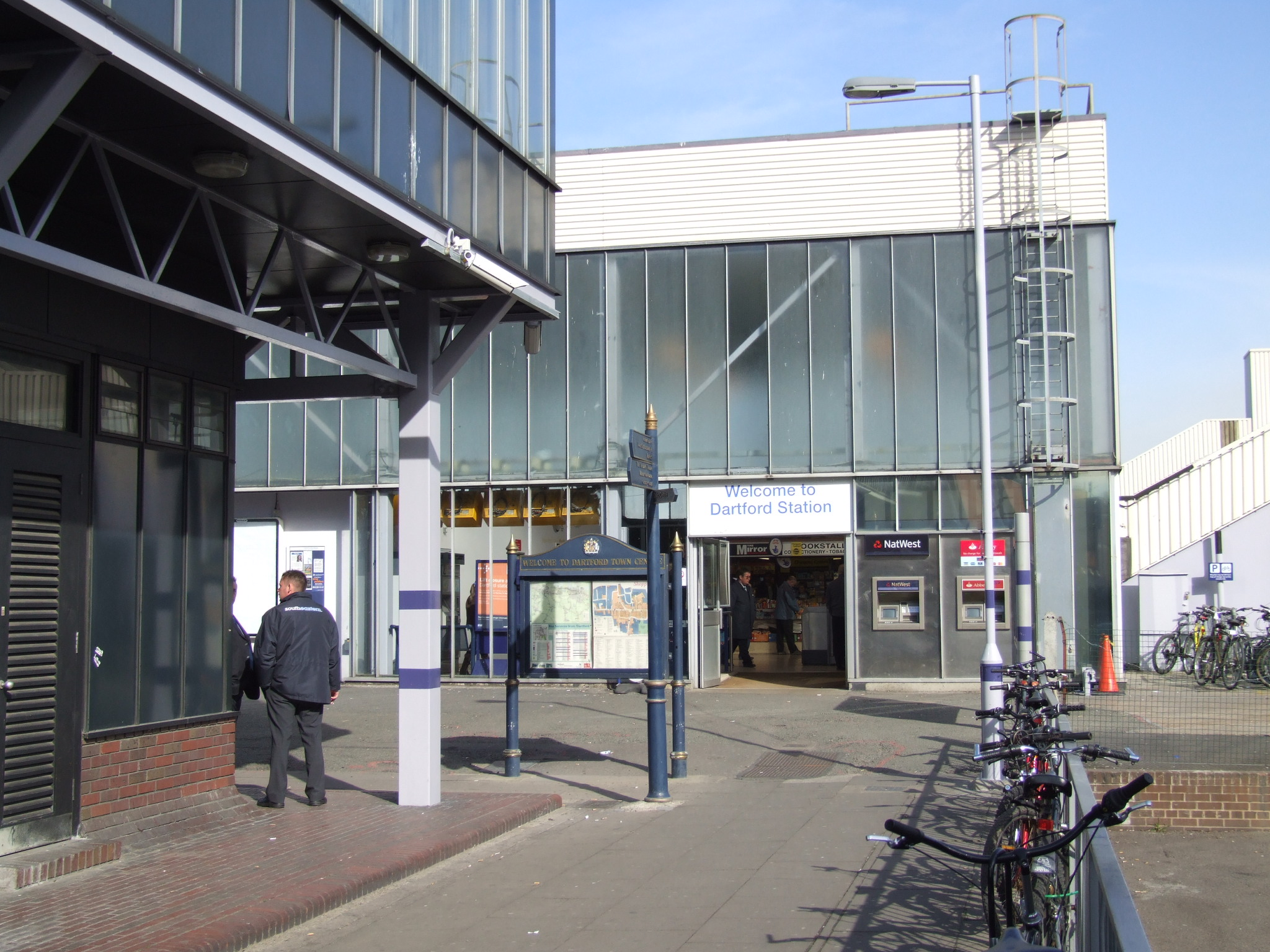
Dartford railway station

Dartford railway station is located in the town centre and is connected to London by three National Rail routes. The first London to Dartford connection by rail was the North Kent Line via Woolwich Arsenal in 1849, connecting at Gravesend with the line to the Medway Towns. Later, two more lines were built: the Dartford Loop Line through Sidcup, which opened in 1866, and the Bexleyheath Line, which opened in 1895. All the lines were electrified by 6 June 1926.

The station is served by two train operating companies:

- Southeastern, which provides services from Gravesend to London Charing Cross, London Cannon Street and London Victoria.
- Thameslink operates a route between Rainham (Kent) and Luton.

=== Buses ===
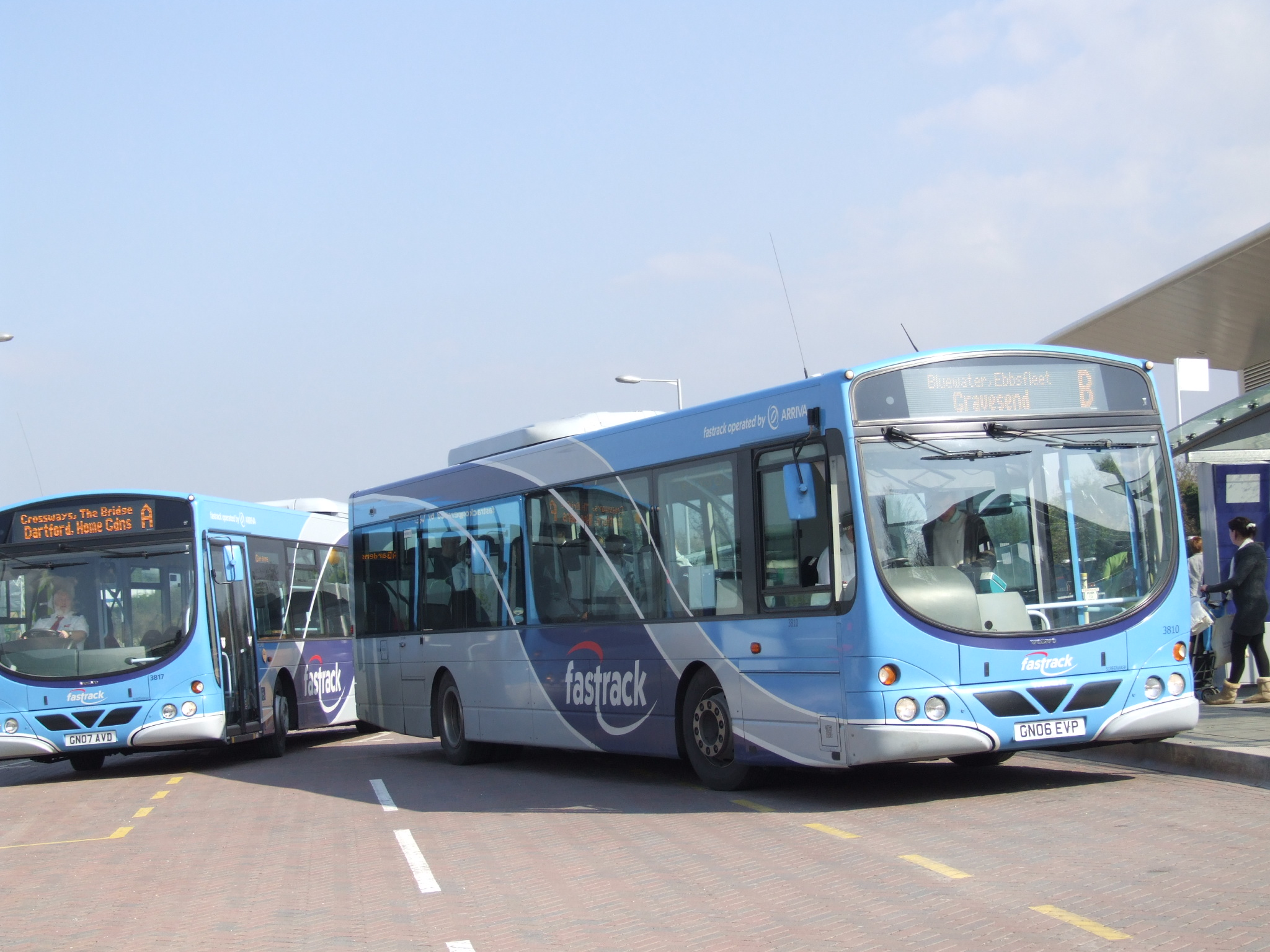
Fastrack buses at Greenhithe railway station

Dartford is served by many bus services provided by Transport for London, Arriva Kent Thameside, Arriva London and GoBus.

These routes connect Dartford with areas including Bluewater, Bexleyheath, Crayford, Erith, Gravesend, Greenhithe, Orpington, Sidcup, Swanley, Welling, and Woolwich.

== Places of worship ==
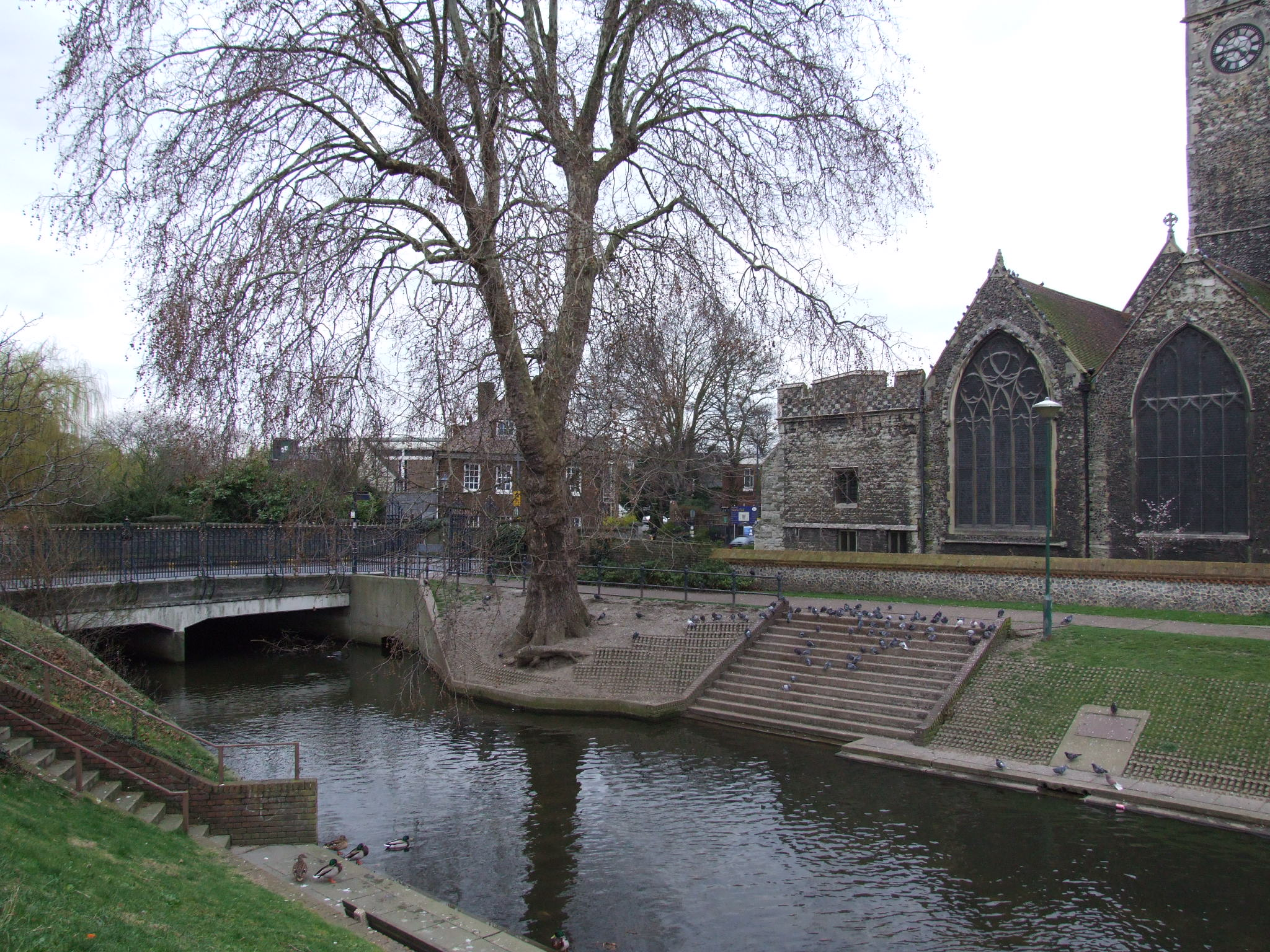
The ford, now Dartford Bridge over the River Darent, and Holy Trinity Church

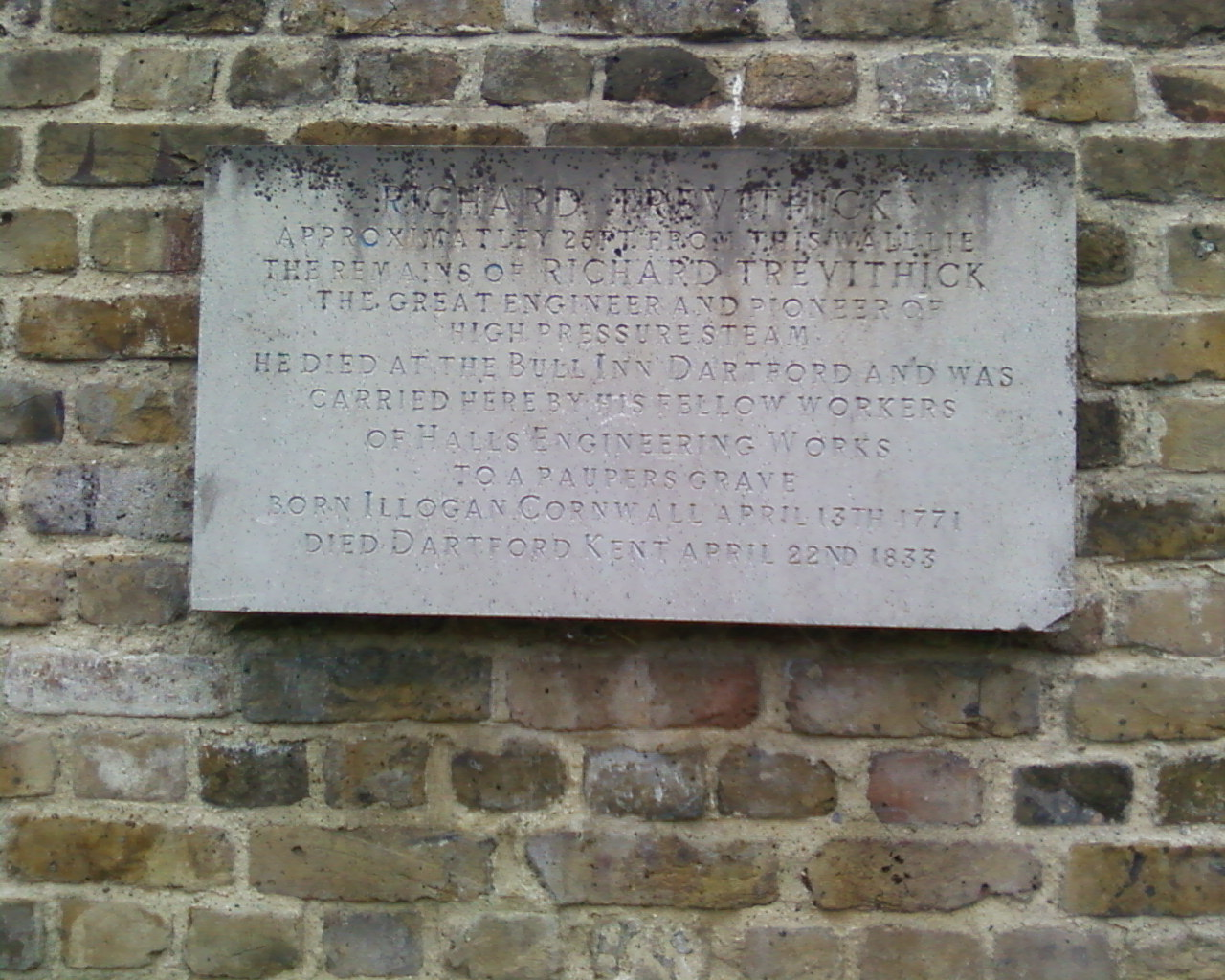
Richard Trevithick memorial at St. Edmund's Park

The parish church, Holy Trinity, is situated on the western bank of the River Darent, from where a hermit would conduct travellers across the ford. The church was originally a 9th-century Saxon structure, but gained later Norman additions. Also on display within the church is a brass plaque commemorating the work of Richard Trevithick, the pioneer of steam propulsion, who, at the end of his career, lived, worked (at J & E Hall) and died in the town.

Other places of worship in Dartford include: Brent Methodist Church, Brethren's Meeting Room, Dartford Methodist Church, Highfield Road Baptist Church, Net Church, St Alban's Church, St Andrew's United Reformed Church, Christ Church Dartford, Grace Outreach Church, and Zion Strict Baptist Chapel.

The graveyard is situated in St Edmund's Pleasance on the summit of East Hill (the place where Richard Trevithick is buried), which gave rise to a traditional and derogatory rhyme of Dartford's people: "Dirty Dartford, filthy people, bury their dead above the steeple." The church actually has no steeple; it has a tower featuring a ring of eight bells.

== Twinned towns ==
Dartford is twinned with:

- Hanau, Hesse, Germany
- Gravelines, Nord, France

== Notable people ==
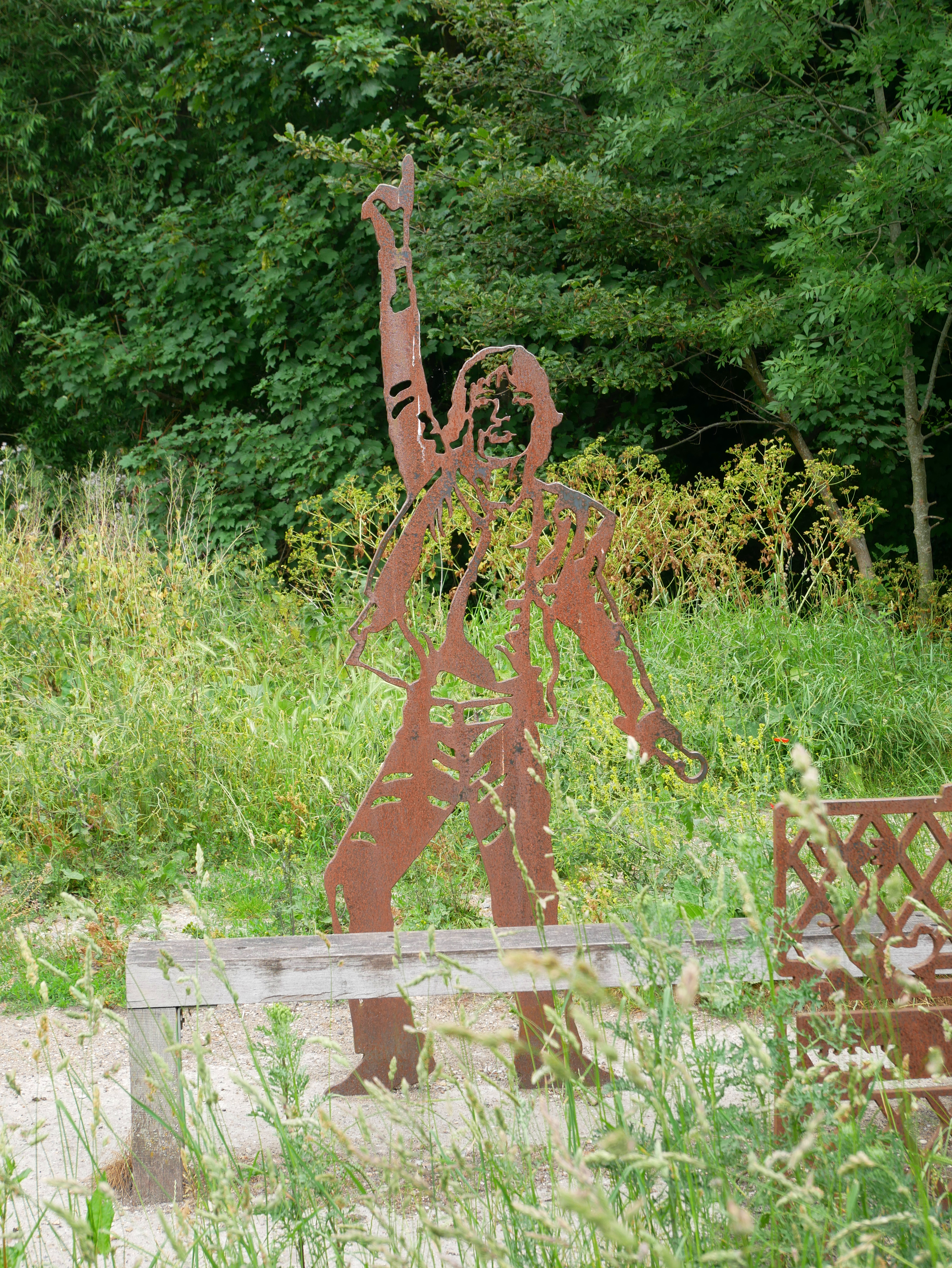
A sculpture of Mick Jagger, who grew up in Dartford, in the town's Central Park

The following are from or have lived in Dartford (or other connection if specified):

- Doreen Allen (1879–1963), militant suffragette
- Malcolm Allison (1927–2010), football player and manager
- Andrea Arnold (born 1961), Oscar and BAFTA winning film director
- George Barton (1808–1864), Sussex cricketer
- Martina Bergman-Österberg (1849–1915), physical education pioneer and founder of Dartford College
- Peter Blake (born 1932), pop artist
- Edward Brander (1845–1883), cricketer
- Richard Cant (born 1964), actor
- Dave Charnley (1935–2012), British Lightweight Champion boxer (1957–63)
- Ron Cooper (1932–2012), bicycle frame builder
- Mackenzie Crook (born 1971), actor
- Graham Dilley (1959–2011), Kent and England cricketer
- Bernie Ecclestone (Born 1930), former CEO of Formula 1. Lived in Dartford for most of his childhood and early adult life. Attended Dartford West Secondary School
- Peter Glaze (1917–1983), comedian
- Len Goodman (1944–2023), dance expert
- Ivor Gurney (1890–1937), composer and poet
- John Hall (1765–1836), founder of engineering business J & E Hall, based in Dartford
- Laura Hamilton (born 1982), TV presenter (A Place in the Sun), attended Dartford Grammar School for Girls
- Paul Hartnoll (born 1968) and Phil Hartnoll (born 1964), electronic musicians and members of the band Orbital
- Henry Havelock (1795–1857), military general
- Jimmy Havoc (born 1984), professional wrestler
- Barry Hawkins (born 1979), professional snooker player
- Terry Hollands (born 1979), Britain's Strongest Man (2007)
- A. E. Holt White (1851–1933), non-fiction writer and illustrator
- Henry Ambrose Hunt (1866–1946), meteorologist
- Mick Jagger (born 1943), singer-songwriter, founding member of the Rolling Stones
- Thomas Walter Jennings (1917–1978), founded Jennings Musical Instruments (JMI) Ltd. (Vox Amplifiers) in Dartford
- Diane Keen (born 1946), actress
- Sidney Keyes (1922–1943), war poet
- John Latham (1743–1837), ornithologist
- Nick Lee (born 1983), cricketer
- Phil May (born 1944), vocalist, The Pretty Things
- Patrick Mackay (born 1952), serial killer
- Matt Morgan (born 1977), comedy writer, The Original Victim
- Steve Nieve (born 1958), keyboardist, Elvis Costello
- Topsy Ojo (born 1985), London Irish and England rugby union full-back, attended Dartford Grammar School
- Min Patel (born 1970), Kent and England cricketer
- Keith Richards (born 1943), guitarist and songwriter, The Rolling Stones
- Steve Rider (born 1950), TV sports presenter
- David Russell (born 1957), golfer
- Paul Samson (1953–2002), rock guitarist
- Jeffrey Snowden (born 1973), former cricketer
- Alfred Sturge (1816–1901), pastor and missionary
- Dick Taylor (born 1943), guitarist, The Pretty Things
- Pete Tong (born 1960), house DJ
- Richard Trevithick (1771–1833), inventor and mining engineer, died in Dartford
- Mary Ann Lake Wallis (1821–1910), New Zealand orphanage matron
- Andy Wilmot (born 1980), racing driver
- William James Erasmus Wilson (1809–1884), surgeon

== Bibliography ==
- Kent History Illustrated - Frank W Jessup (KCC, 1966)
- Railways of the Southern Region - Geoffrey Body (PSL Field Guide 1989)
- The History and Antiquities of Dartford, with Topographical Notices of the Neighbourhood (1844) – John Dunkin, Google Books
