= George Barton (cricketer) =

English cricketer

Personal information
- Full name: George Barton
- Born: 8 June 1808; Dartford, Kent, England
- Died: 20 June 1864 (aged 56); Uckfield, Sussex, England
- Batting: Right-handed

Domestic team information
- Years: Team
- 1839–1856: Sussex
- 1835–1838: Sussex

George Barton (8 June 1808 – 20 June 1864) was an English cricketer. Barton was a right-handed batsman. He was born at Dartford, Kent.

Barton made his debut for Sussex against the Marylebone Cricket Club in 1835 at the Royal New Ground, Brighton. He next appeared for Sussex in 1836 against Kent, before playing the same opposition again in 1838. In 1839, he appeared in a single important match for the Gentlemen of Sussex against the Marylebone Cricket Club, as well as playing in that season for the newly formed Sussex County Cricket Club in its second match, against England. Barton played for Sussex until 1856, making a further 30 appearances for the club, the last of which was against Kent in 1856. In total, he played 34 matches for Sussex, before and after the county club's formation, scoring 359 runs at an average of 6.90, with a high score of 34. During his career, he also played in one match each for the Gentlemen against the Players and for the South against the North.

He died at Uckfield, Sussex on 20 June 1864.
