= Kevin Masters (cricketer) =

English cricketer

Personal information
- Full name: Kevin David Masters
- Born: 19 May 1961 (age 65); Chatham, Kent
- Batting: Left-handed
- Bowling: Right-arm medium-fast
- Relatives: David Masters (son); Daniel Masters (son)

Domestic team information
- Years: Team
- 1983–1984: Kent
- 1995–1996: Cambridgeshire
- 1999–2002: Kent Cricket Board

Career statistics
Competition	First-class	List A
Matches	4	14
Runs scored	1	12
Batting average	0.16	6.00
100s/50s	0/0	0/0
Top score	1	4*
Balls bowled	449	675
Wickets	6	8
Bowling average	40.00	45.00
5 wickets in innings	0	0
10 wickets in match	0	0
Best bowling	2/26	2/52
Catches/stumpings	2/–	1/–
- Source: Cricinfo, 13 November 2010

Kevin David Masters (born 19 May 1961) is an English former professional cricketer. Masters was born at Chatham in Kent and played for Kent County Cricket Club between 1983 and 1984.

Masters made his first-class cricket debut for Kent against Hampshire in 1983. He played four first-class matches for Kent, the last of which came against Somerset, and one limited overs match against Worcestershire in 1984.

After a gap of 11 years Masters made his Minor Counties Championship debut for Cambridgeshire County Cricket Club against Norfolk. He later represented the Kent Cricket Board in List A cricket.

He has played club cricket for Upchurch Cricket Club in the Kent Cricket League and runs a building and construction company, KD Masters.

== Family ==
Masters' son, David, played over 200 first-class cricket matches for Kent, Leicestershire and Essex. Another son, Daniel played briefly for Leicestershire between 2009 and 2010.
