= Daniel Masters =

English cricketer (born 1986)

Daniel Masters (born 7 December 1986) is an English cricketer who played in three List A matches for Leicestershire in 2009 and 2010. He was born in Chatham, Kent and is the son of Kevin Masters, who played first-class cricket for Kent and the brother of David Masters who played for Kent, Leicestershire and Essex.
