= Jeffrey Snowden =

English cricketer

Personal information
- Full name: Jeffrey James Snowden
- Born: 15 September 1973 (age 53); Dartford, Kent, England
- Batting: Right-handed
- Role: Wicketkeeper

Domestic team information
- Years: Team
- 2001: Kent Cricket Board

Career statistics
Competition	LA
Matches	1
Runs scored	–
Batting average	–
100s/50s	–/–
Top score	–
Balls bowled	–
Wickets	–
Bowling average	–
5 wickets in innings	–
10 wickets in match	–
Best bowling	–
Catches/stumpings	–/–
- Source: Cricinfo, 12 November 2010

Jeffrey James Snowden (born 15 September 1973) is a former English cricketer. Snowden was a right-handed batsman & wicketkeeper with a top score of over 200 in club cricket. He was born at Dartford, Kent.

Snowden represented the Kent Cricket Board in a single List A match against the Hampshire Cricket Board in the 2001 Cheltenham & Gloucester Trophy. In a match ruined by rain, Snowden was not required to bat as the Kent Cricket Board were unable to play their innings.
