= Kenny Bingham =

English cricketer and rugby union player

Personal information
- Full name: Kenneth Robert James Bingham
- Born: 20 September 1980 (age 46); Oxford, Oxfordshire, England
- Batting: Right-handed
- Role: Wicket-keeper

Domestic team information
- Years: Team
- 2002: Kent Cricket Board

Career statistics
Competition	List A
Matches	2
Runs scored	0
Batting average	0.00
100s/50s	0/0
Top score	0
Catches/stumpings	0/–
- Source: Cricinfo, 12 November 2010

Kenneth Robert James Bingham (born 20 September 1980) is a former English cricketer and rugby union player. Bingham was a right-handed batsman who played primarily as a wicketkeeper. As a rugby player he played mostly on the wing.

Bingham was born in Oxford, Oxfordshire, and went to St Edward's and Loughborough University.

Bingham represented the Kent Cricket Board in 2 List A matches. These came against Hampshire in the 2002 Cheltenham & Gloucester Trophy and the Leicestershire Cricket Board in the 2nd round of the 2003 Cheltenham & Gloucester Trophy which was held in 2002.

Bingham played both sports for a number of years before deciding to concentrate on Rugby Union, representing The Barbarians, England Counties, Richmond and Newbury.
