= Mark George (Australian cricketer) =

Australian cricketer

Personal information
- Full name: Mark Thomas George
- Born: 22 December 1977 (age 48); Ryde, New South Wales, Australia
- Batting: Right-handed
- Bowling: Right-arm fast-medium

Domestic team information
- Years: Team
- 2003: Kent Cricket Board

Career statistics
Competition	List A
Matches	1
Runs scored	7
Batting average	7.00
100s/50s	0/0
Top score	7
Balls bowled	51
Wickets	1
Bowling average	61.00
5 wickets in innings	0
10 wickets in match	0
Best bowling	1/61
Catches/stumpings	0/–
- Source: Cricinfo, 13 November 2010

Mark Thomas George (born 22 December 1977) is an Australian former cricketer. Thomas was a right-handed batsman who played bowled right-arm fast-medium. He was born at Ryde, New South Wales.

George played for the Kent Cricket Board in a single List A match against Derbyshire in the 2003 Cheltenham & Gloucester Trophy. In his only List A match, he scored seven runs and took a single wicket at a cost of 61 runs.
