= Mark S. George =

American medical scientist

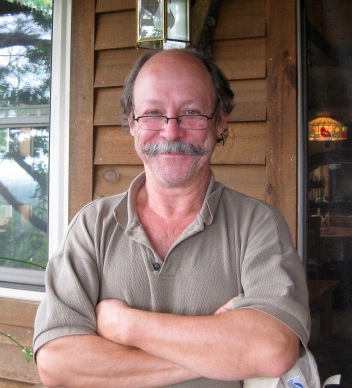
Mark S. George

Mark S. George (born 17 March 1958) is a Distinguished University Professor of psychiatry, radiology and neurosciences and is the director of the Medical University of South Carolina (MUSC) Center for Advanced Imaging Research as well as the Brain Stimulation Laboratory. As of June 2020, his research has been cited over 47,000 times, with an h-index of 113 and i-10 index of 404.

George's main research interests include major depression, bipolar disorder, anxiety disorders (particularly obsessive–compulsive disorder), Tourette syndrome, and chronic pain. His principal techniques include neuroimaging (functional magnetic resonance imaging and Positron emission tomography), brain stimulation, vagus nerve stimulation (VNS), transcranial magnetic stimulation (TMS), deep brain stimulation (DBS), and electroconvulsive therapy (ECT).

After earning his B.A. in philosophy (cum laude) at Davidson College in 1980, George went on to earn his M.D. from the Medical University of South Carolina in Charleston, South Carolina in 1985, where he still works today. George received the Falcone Prize for Outstanding Achievement in Affective Disorders Research in 2008 (renamed the Colvin Prize in 2012) from the Brain & Behavior Research Foundation and is a member of the Foundation's Scientific Council.

George received approval from the U.S. Food and Drug Administration to use TMS to treat depression. It is thought to be especially effective to treat people whose depression does not respond to antidepressant medications.

George has also been integral to the research on using fMRI as a method of lie detection. This research indicates that specific regions of the brain are activated when a subject deceives, and has shown a high success rate in clinical trials. It remains to be seen whether this method will eventually replace traditional polygraphs in legal settings.
