= List of Derbyshire Cricket Board List A players =

The Derbyshire Cricket Board (DCB) team competed in List A cricket from 1999 until 2002, taking part in the England and Wales Cricket Board's main knock-out trophy, known as the NatWest Trophy and then Cheltenham & Gloucester Trophy while the DCB played in it. Established as the Gillette Cup in 1963, the knock-out trophy expanded from 32 teams to 60 teams in 1999, featuring all of the minor counties, and the Cricket Board teams from the first-class counties. The Cricket Board teams were considered to be roughly equivalent talent to the minor counties, and they all entered in the first or second round, prior to the first-class counties who entered in the third round.

Jamie Benstead was the team's highest aggregate run-scorer, accumulating 165 runs for the team, while Ian Parkin took more wickets for the DCB than any other player, claiming ten during his matches for the team. In all, 35 players have appeared for the DCB, of which 11 have also made first-class cricket appearances.

Players are initially listed in order of appearance, where players made their debut in the same match, they are ordered by batting order.

== Key ==
All statistics apply only to matches played for Derbyshire Cricket Board

General

- ‡ – Captain
- † – Wicket-keeper
- ^{F} – Player has appeared in first-class cricket
- First – Year of debut
- Last – Year of latest match played
- Mat – Number of matches played

Batting

- Inn – Number of innings batted
- NO – Number of innings not out
- Runs – Runs scored
- HS – Highest score
- Avg – Runs scored per dismissal
- * – Batsman remained not out

Bowling

- Balls – Balls bowled
- Wkt – Wickets taken
- BBI – Best bowling in an innings
- Ave – Average runs per wicket
- Eco – Economy rate

Fielding

- Ca – Catches taken
- St – Stumpings effected

== List of players ==
Derbyshire Cricket Board List A players
No.	Name	Nationality	First	Last	Mat	Batting			Bowling				Fielding		Ref(s)
No.	Name	Nationality	First	Last	Mat	Runs	HS	Avg	Balls	Wkt	BBI	Ave	Ca	St	Ref(s)
1	David Smit	England	1999	2002	5	94	38	18.80	0	–	–	–	3	0	
2	Adrian Marsh	England	1999	2001	4	73	53	18.25	0	–	–	–	2	0	
3	Doug Watson ^{F}	South Africa	1999	1999	1	19	19	19.00	0	–	–	–	0	0	
4	Kamran Afzaal	England	1999	1999	1	14	14	14.00	0	–	–	–	0	0	
5	Ian Darlington	England	1999	2002	6	163	58	32.60	229	4	3/19	50.50	0	0	
6	Chris Marples ‡† ^{F}	England	1999	2000	3	15	11	5.00	0	–	–	–	4	0	
7	Nathan Dumelow ^{F}	England	1999	2000	2	56	32	28.00	90	2	2/21	32.50	0	0	
8	Simon Moore ‡	England	1999	2002	2	22	12	11.00	120	4	2/46	28.25	1	0	
9	Peter Camm	England	1999	2001	3	20	20	10.00	143	4	4/52	36.25	0	0	
10	Ian Parkin	England	1999	2002	6	89	23*	22.25	337	10	5/24	21.20	4	0	
11	David Ward	England	1999	2000	2	23	22*	–	102	4	2/31	19.50	0	0	
12	Jamie Benstead ‡	England	2000	2002	6	165	65	27.50	19	0	–	–	2	0	
13	Rawait Khan ^{F}	England	2000	2000	1	29	29	29.00	0	–	–	–	0	0	
14	Pervez Iqbal ^{F}	Pakistan	2000	2000	1	6	6	6.00	60	1	1/30	30.00	0	0	
15	David Dodds	England	2000	2001	3	0	0*	–	144	0	–	–	0	0	
16	Peter Davies	England	2000	2000	1	0	0	0.00	0	–	–	–	0	0	
17	Alan Gofton ^{F}	England	2000	2000	1	6	6	6.00	60	1	1/30	30.00	0	0	
18	Matthew Hall	England	2000	2001	2	15	8	7.50	90	0	–	–	0	0	
19	Kevin Hollis †	England	2000	2001	4	18	7*	9.00	0	–	–	–	1	2	
20	Andrew Goodwin	England	2001	2001	2	38	38	19.00	0	–	–	–	1	0	
21	Ben Spendlove ‡ ^{F}	England	2001	2001	2	69	55	34.50	0	–	–	–	1	0	
22	Carl Eyden	England	2001	2001	3	5	3	1.66	38	1	1/60	60.00	0	0	
23	Simon Lacey ‡ ^{F}	England	2001	2001	1	15	15	15.00	60	1	1/26	26.00	1	0	
24	George Moulds	England	2001	2001	2	18	18	18.00	84	3	2/19	15.66	1	0	
25	John Jordison ^{F}	England	2001	2001	2	0	0	0.00	94	2	2/27	31.50	0	0	
26	Carl Doar	England	2001	2001	2	0	0*	0.00	60	1	1/44	59.00	1	0	
27	William Bagshawe	England	2001	2001	1	44	44	44.00	0	–	–	–	0	0	
28	Joe Greenhalgh	England	2001	2001	1	1	1	1.00	42	1	1/49	49.00	0	0	
29	Kaisar Altaf	England	2001	2001	1	1	1	1.00	60	0	–	–	0	0	
30	John Trueman	England	2002	2002	1	24	24	24.00	60	0	–	–	1	0	
31	John Owen ^{F}	England	2002	2002	1	48	48	48.00	0	–	–	–	1	0	
32	Naeem Akhtar ^{F}	Pakistan	2002	2002	1	6	6	6.00	60	3	3/40	13.33	1	0	
33	Dave Hallack ‡	England	2002	2002	1	9	9	9.00	0	–	–	–	0	0	
34	James Ede	England	2002	2002	1	10	10	10.00	30	1	1/20	20.00	0	0	
35	Russell Sexton †	England	2002	2002	1	1	1*	–	0	–	–	–	1	0	
