= Doar =

Doar is a surname. Notable people with the surname include:

- Carl Doar (born 1983), English cricketer
- John Doar (1921–2014), American lawyer
- Katie Doar (born 2001), New Zealand field hockey player
- Madison Doar (born 1999), New Zealand field hockey player
- Robert Doar, American businessman
- William W. Doar (born 1935), American politician
