= Peter Davis =

Peter or Pete Davis may refer to:

- Peter Hadland Davis (1918–1992), British botanist
- Peter George Davis (1923–2011), British Special Boat Service officer
- Peter G. Davis (1936–2021), American opera critic and scholar
- Peter Davis (director) (born 1937), American news writer and documentary filmmaker
- Sir Peter Davis (businessman) (born 1941), British businessman
- Peter Davis (sociologist) (born 1947), professor of sociology and husband of former New Zealand Prime Minister Helen Clark
- Peter Davis (theater historian), professor at the University of Illinois
- Peter Lovell-Davis, Baron Lovell-Davis (1924–2001), British publishing executive and Labour Party politician
- Peter Davis (musician) (1887–1971), New Orleans musician and teacher
- Peter Barrett Davis (born 1956), American automotive designer
- Pete Davis (pagan) (1937–2014), American religious figure in modern Paganism
- Pete Davis (politician), British Columbia provincial legislator
- Peter Davis (British director)

== See also ==
- Peter Davies (disambiguation)
- Peter Davis Oakey (1861–1920), U.S. representative from Connecticut
