= Peter Davies =

Peter or Pete Davies may refer to:

== Arts and entertainment ==
- Peter Llewelyn Davies (1897–1960), British publisher, basis for the character of Peter Pan
- Peter Maxwell Davies (1934–2016), British composer and conductor
- Troy Davies (Peter Davies, 1960–2007), Australian artist and musician
- Peter Ho Davies (born 1966), British novelist
- Peter Davies (artist) (born 1970), Scottish painter

== Sports ==
- Peter Davies (rugby) (1925–2014), Welsh rugby player
- Peter Davies (footballer, born 1936) (1936–2023), Welsh footballer
- Peter Davies (footballer, born 1942), Welsh footballer
- Peter Davies (Australian cricketer) (1957–2018), Australian cricketer
- Peter Davies (English cricketer) (born 1976), English cricketer
- Pete Davies, English sports historian

== Others ==
- Peter Davies (economic historian) (1927–2020), British economic historian
- Peter Ronald Davies (born 1938), British Army general
- Peter J. Davies (born 1940), American professor of plant physiology
- Peter Davies (politician) (born 1948), British politician, former mayor of Doncaster
- Peter Davies (scientist) (1948–2020), Welsh medical researcher
- Peter Davies (journalist) (active 1996–2011), South African journalist

== See also ==
- Peter Davies (horse) (born 1988), thoroughbred racehorse
- Peter Davis (disambiguation)
