= Matthew Hall =

Matthew Hall may refer to:

- Matthew Hall (actor) (born 1991), English television actor
- Matthew Hall (boxer) (born 1984), English professional boxer
- Matthew Hall (curler) (born 1997), Canadian curler
- Matthew Hall (figure skater) (born 1970), Canadian figure-skater
- Matthew Hall (swimmer), Australian swimmer, see 2000 Oceania Swimming Championships
- Matthew Hall (writer) (born 1967), English screenwriter and novelist
- Matthew Hall, the real name of the British comedian Harry Hill
- Matthew Hall (cricketer) (born 1981), former English cricketer
- Matthew Hall (footballer) (1884–?), Scottish footballer for Sunderland
- Matthew Hall (sport shooter), represented Northern Ireland at the 2010 Commonwealth Games

== See also ==
- Matheau Hall (born 1987), American association football player
- Matt Hall (disambiguation)
- Matthews Hall (disambiguation)
