= Andrew Goodwin =

Andrew Goodwin may refer to:

- Andrew Goodwin (tenor), Australian-born operatic tenor
- Andrew Goodwin (chemist), Australian-born chemistry professor at Oxford University
- Andrew Goodwin (cricketer) (born 1982), English former cricketer
- Andy Goodwin (born 1963), Australian rules footballer
