= James Tomlinson =

English cricketer (born 1982)

Personal information
- Full name: James Andrew Tomlinson
- Born: 12 June 1982 (age 44); Winchester, Hampshire, England
- Nickname: Tommo
- Height: 6 ft 2 in (1.88 m)
- Batting: Left-handed
- Bowling: Left arm medium

Domestic team information
- Years: Team
- 2000: Hampshire Cricket Board
- 2001: Wiltshire
- 2002–2016: Hampshire (squad no. 21)

Career statistics
Competition	FC	LA	T20
Matches	129	36	2
Runs scored	945	53	5
Batting average	10.61	5.30	5.00
100s/50s	0/1	0/0	0/0
Top score	51	14	5
Balls bowled	22,321	1,319	42
Wickets	382	39	1
Bowling average	31.92	29.48	48.00
5 wickets in innings	12	0	0
10 wickets in match	1	0	0
Best bowling	8/46	4/47	1/20
Catches/stumpings	27/–	3/–	0/–
- Source: ESPNcricinfo, 5 April 2017

James Andrew Tomlinson (born 12 June 1982) is an English former cricketer. A left-arm medium pace bowler, capable of producing swing at a brisk pace, Tomlinson first appeared in senior cricket for the Hampshire Cricket Board in List A cricket in the 2000 NatWest Trophy. He first appeared for Hampshire in first-class cricket in 2002, at this stage of career he had to work his cricket career around his studies at Cardiff University. In 2003 he was Hampshire's recipient of the NBC Denis Compton Award. His early career with Hampshire was beset by injury, which limited his appearances. By 2008, Tomlinson had established himself in the Hampshire team, mostly as a specialist first-class player. It was in this season that he became the first Hampshire bowler since Malcolm Marshall to end the season as the leading wicket taker in the County Championship, finishing with 67 wickets.

== Career ==
=== Early life and career ===
Born at Winchester, Hampshire on 12 June 1982, the son of Canon Ian Tomlinson, Tomlinson was educated at Harrow Way School and was captain of the school cricket team which reached the semi-finals of the Hampshire Schools Cup in 1995 (a notable achievement for a school from the state sector), from where he attended Cricklade College, Andover. He later studied for his degree at Cardiff University.

Tomlinson played his first senior match in List A match in the 2000 NatWest Trophy for the Hampshire Cricket Board (HCB) against Huntingdonshire at Grasmere Road, Cove, with Tomlinson going wicketless in the match, though his ten over spell conceded only 17 runs. In that same season, he also made two MCCA Knockout Trophy appearances for the HCB, against Dorset and Berkshire. The following season, Tomlinson appeared in a single List A match for Wiltshire in the 2001 Cheltenham & Gloucester Trophy against the Derbyshire Cricket Board at Hardenhuish Park, Chippenham. He claimed his maiden one-day wicket in this match when he dismissed opening batsman Andrew Goodwin.

In the 2002 season, Tomlinson, who was studying at Cardiff University, was called up to the British Universities cricket team, making his first-class debut for the team against the touring Sri Lankans. He took the wicket of Kumar Sangakkara in this match to claim his maiden first-class wicket, with the match itself ending in a draw. He made his first appearance for Hampshire in that season, against Sussex in a List A match in the 2002 Norwich Union League. He made eighty further appearances in that competition, taking 10 wickets at an average of 31.90. His first-class debut for the county came in that season as well, against the touring Indians at the Rose Bowl, with Tomlinson taking the wickets of Wasim Jaffer and Harbhajan Singh. He also made four appearances in that seasons County Championship.

Tomlinson made his second and final first-class appearance for the British Universities at the start the 2003 season against the touring Zimbabweans at Edgbaston. Despite featuring just once for Hampshire in limited-overs cricket that season, he did however make indirect appearances in the County Championship, making seven first-class appearances. taking a total of 17 first-class wickets in that season, which came at an average of 146.70. He did however claim his maiden five wicket haul, taking 6/63 against Derbyshire. Injury limited Tomlinson to just a single appearance each in first-class and List A cricket in the 2004 season, while a back injury meant he made no appearances for the county in the 2005 season in which Hampshire finished runners-up in the County Championship. Under the captaincy of Shane Warne, Tomlinson found his opportunities limited. Following his return from injury, he played just a handful of games in the 2006 season, returning to the Hampshire side following his back injury in a low-key early season first-class match against Loughborough UCCE. He also made four List A appearances, as well playing what are to date his only Twenty20 appearances, which came against Sussex and Middlesex in the Twenty20 Cup. The end of the 2006 season saw Tomlinson return to action in the County Championship against Lancashire in Hampshire's final Championship match of that season.

In what was to be Warne's last season as Hampshire captain, Tomlinson featured in just five County Championship matches, taking 30 wickets at an average of 40.61, with best figures of 5/78. He also featured in two List A matches against Middlesex in the Friends Provident Trophy, and Gloucestershire in the Pro40.

=== County Championship regular ===
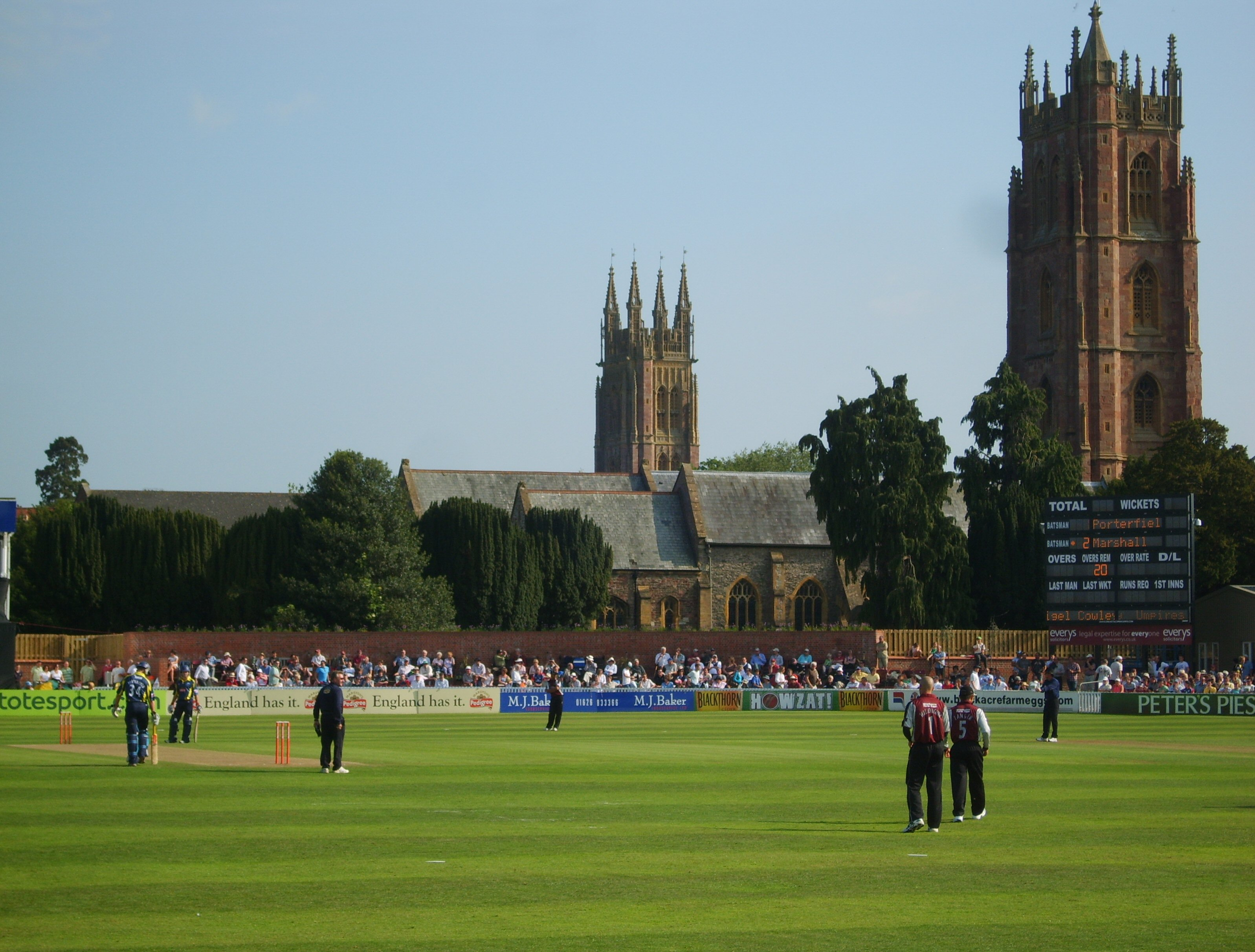
Tomlinson took his career best bowling figures of 8/46 against Somerset at the County Ground, Taunton (pictured).

Under new captain Dimitri Mascarenhas, Tomlinson featured heavily in the 2008 County Championship, making his highest amount of first-class appearances in a season for the county, playing in all sixteen of Hampshire's Championship fixtures. At the forefront of Hampshire's attack, Tomlinson claimed four five wicket hauls across the season, including his career best figures of 8/46 against Somerset at Taunton, figures which remain his innings return to date. He ended the season with 67 wickets at an average of 24.76, to end the season as the leading wicket-taker in the County Championship, and becoming the first Hampshire cricketer to do so since Malcolm Marshall in 1982. His 8/46 against Somerset were also the best figures by a Hampshire since Peter Hartley's 8/65 in 1999. He won his Hampshire cap during this season, and was named the county's Player of the Year.

His performances in 2008, coupled with being injury free, cemented his place as a regular for Hampshire in County Championship matches. In the 2009 County Championship, he featured in twelve of Hampshire's sixteen matches, though with the ball he was less successful than in the previous season, taking 30 wickets at an average of 39.76. Having featured in two List A matches the previous season, Tomlinson featured in none during the 2009 season. The following season, Tomlinson appeared in fifteen of Hampshire's sixteen County Championship matches, taking 46 wickets at an average of 35.30, with best figures of 7/85 against Somerset. This made him Hampshire's leading wicket-taker for the season. He also made his highest first-class score with the bat in this season, scoring 42 against Somerset at the Rose Bowl. His performances helped Hampshire maintain their status in Division One of the County Championship. He also made five List A appearances during this season in the Clydesdale Bank 40, making what is to date his last appearance in that format against Scotland. He took 9 wickets in his five matches, at an average of 21.66 and with best figures of 3/33.

At the start of the 2011 season, Tomlinson suffered a foot injury which ruled him out for the first part of the season. He didn't return to action for Hampshire until June when he appeared in the County Championship against Worcestershire. He featured in just four further matches in the Championship after that, all four of which came in August. In the five matches he featured in, he took 15 wickets at an average of 38.20. Hampshire were relegated to Division Two of the County Championship at the end of this season. In December 2011, Tomlinson extended his contract with Hampshire by two years, taking him to 2013. He made twelve first-class appearances in the 2012 County Championship, taking a total of 43 wickets at an average of 26.30, taking two five wickets hauls and best figures of 5/69. He ended the season as Hampshire's second highest wicket taker in the County Championship, behind David Balcombe's 59. In December 2012, he added a further year to his contract, keeping at Hampshire until the 2014 season.

He passed 250 first-class wickets in Hampshire's first match in the 2013 County Championship against Leicestershire, with Ned Eckersley his 250th wicket.

== Awards and achievements ==
- 2003
  - NBC Denis Compton Award
- 2008
  - Leading wicket taker in the 2008 County Championship
