= Eyden =

Eyden is a surname. Notable people with the surname include:

- Bill Eyden (1930–2004), English jazz drummer
- Carl Eyden (born 1980), English cricketer
