= Jordison =

Jordison is a surname meaning "Son of Jordan". It may refer to:

- Joey Jordison (1975–2021), American drummer for the band Slipknot
- Joel Jordison (born 1978), Canadian curler
- John Jordison (born 1981), English cricketer
