= David Dodds =

David Dodds may refer to:

- David Dodds (cricketer) (born 1981), English cricketer
- David John Dodds (born 1930), marathoner and jockey
- Davie Dodds (born 1958), Scottish footballer
- David J. Dodds (1952–1987), American aviator and the first officer of Northwest Airlines Flight 255

== See also ==
- David Dodd (disambiguation)
