= Fiat Barchetta =

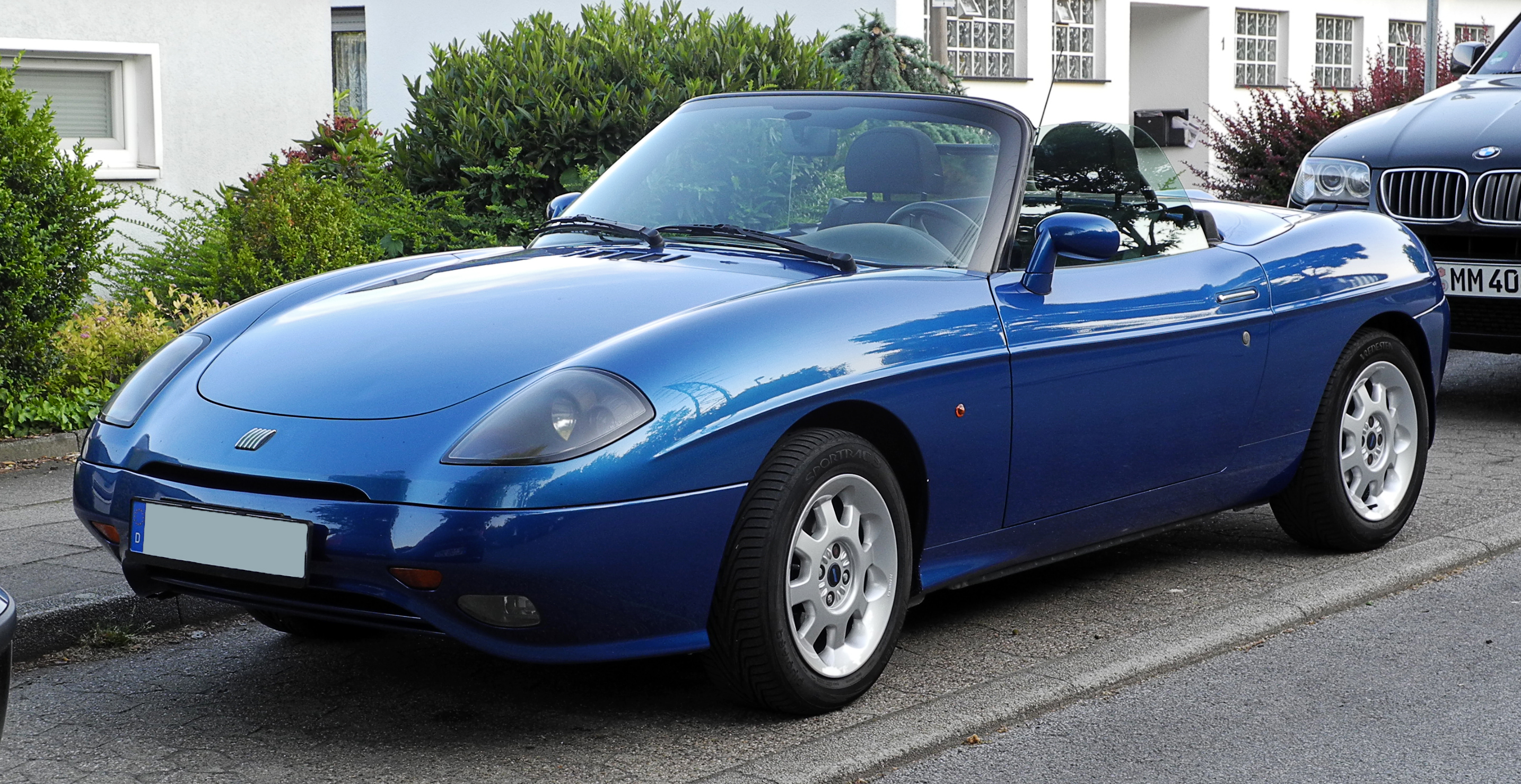

Overview
- Manufacturer: Fiat Auto
- Production: 1995–2005
- Assembly: Italy: Chivasso (Maggiora: 1995–2003); Italy: Turin (Mirafiori plant: 2003–2005)
- Designer: Andreas Zapatinas and Alessandro Cavazza (1992), Peter Davis (Interior) at Centro Stile Fiat; Tom Tjaarda (facelift)

Body and chassis
- Class: Sports car (S)
- Body style: 2-door roadster
- Layout: Front-engine, front-wheel-drive
- Related: Fiat Punto (176)

Powertrain
- Engine: 1.8 L Family B 16V I4
- Transmission: 5-speed manual

Dimensions
- Wheelbase: 2,275 mm (89.6 in)
- Length: 3,916 mm (154.2 in)
- Width: 1,640 mm (64.6 in)
- Height: 1,265 mm (49.8 in)
- Kerb weight: 1,056 kg (2,328 lb)

Chronology
- Predecessor: Fiat 124 Sport Spider; Fiat X1/9
- Successor: Fiat 124 Spider (2016)

The Fiat Barchetta (Italian pronunciation: [ˈfiːat barˈketta]; Type 183) is a roadster produced by the Italian manufacturer Fiat from 1995 to 2005. Barchetta in Italian means "little boat", and also denotes a type of open-top sports car body style.

== History ==
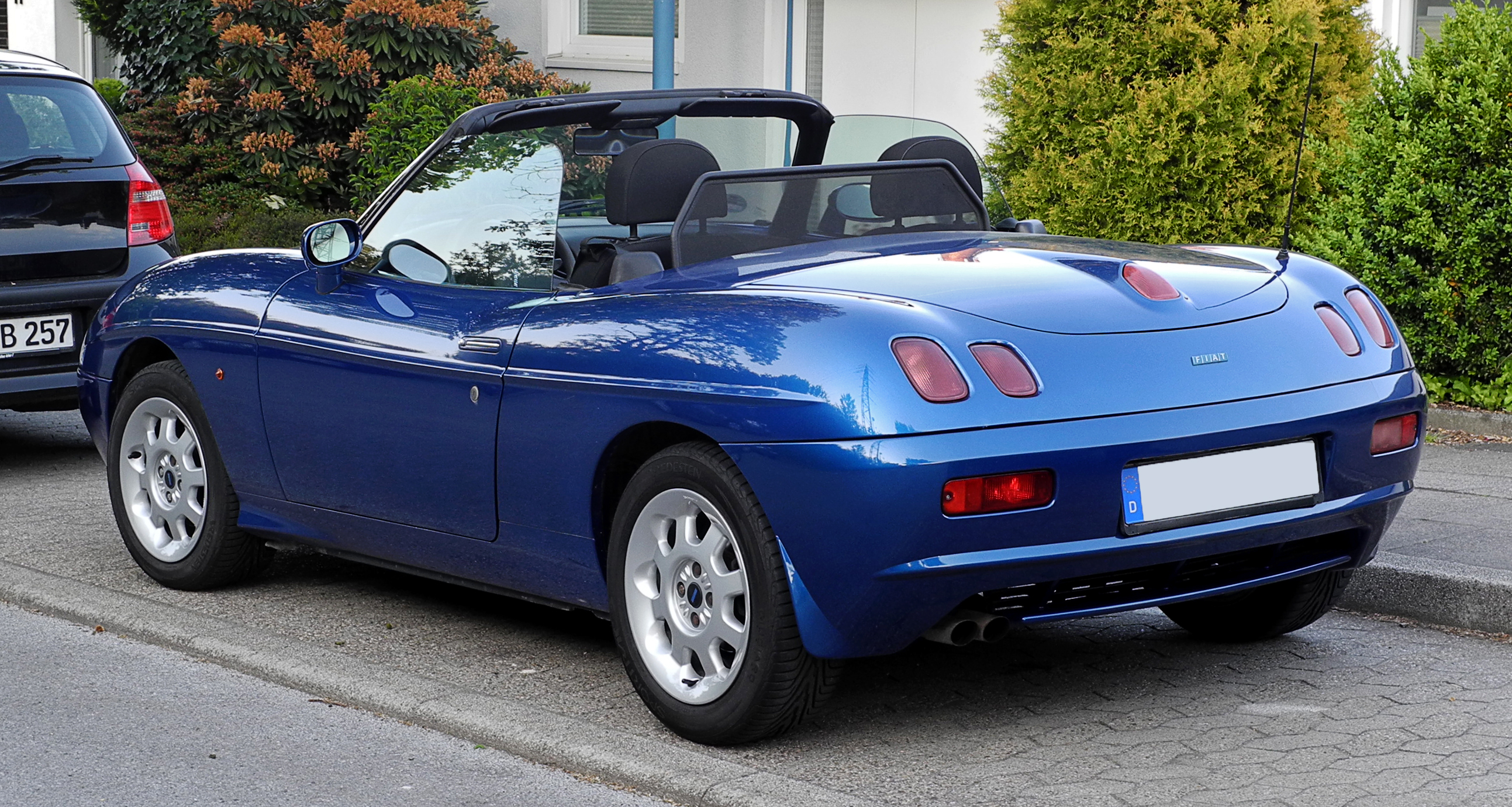
Fiat Barchetta rear view (with third brake light on the bootlid)

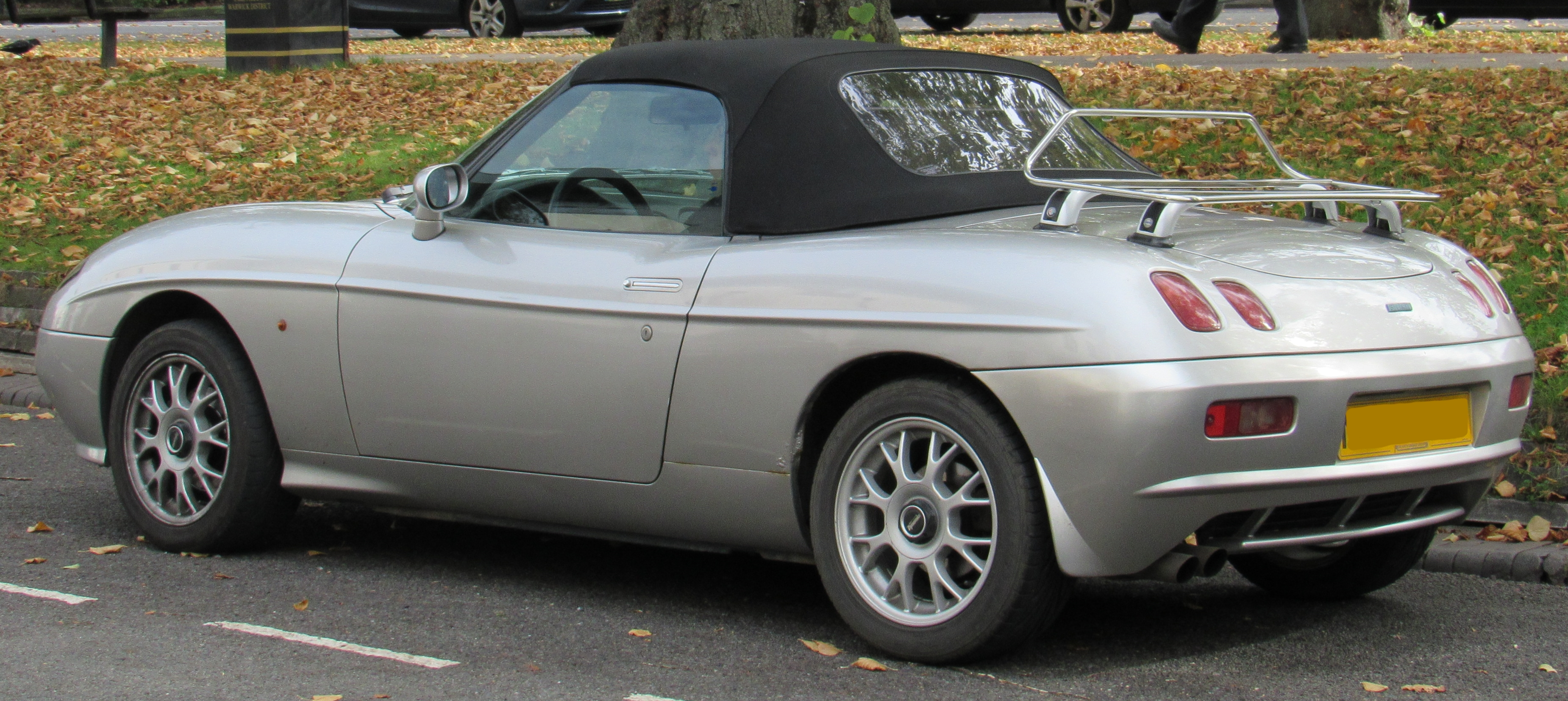
Fiat Barchetta rear view (without third brake light on bootlid)

The Barchetta was developed between 1990 and 1994 under the project name Tipo B Spider 176. It was designed by Andreas Zapatinas and Alessandro Cavazza, under the supervision of Peter Barrett Davis and other car designers at the Centro Stile Fiat, and prototyping was carried out by Stola.

Production began in January 1995 and lasted until June 2005, with a brief pause, due to the bankruptcy of coachbuilder Maggiora. The Barchetta was based on the chassis of the Mark 1 Fiat Punto, but with shortened wheelbase. The Barchetta has a 1,747 cc DOHC, petrol four-cylinder engine fitted with variable valve timing.

The engine has 131 PS (96 kW; 129 hp) at 6,300 rpm and 164 N⋅m (121 lb⋅ft) of torque at 4,300 rpm. The Barchetta weighs 1056 kg (2328 lb) without air conditioning and can accelerate to 100 km/h (62 mph) in 8.9 seconds and has a top speed of 200 km/h (124 mph).

It came in various trim levels which offered different features, for example, diamond cross stitch, patterned red leather instead of the standard black leather or fabric seats, alloy wheels instead of steel wheels, or fog-lights as an option. Arguably one of the biggest external cosmetic changes was made by the addition of the third brake light, first introduced by Fiat on the Lido and Riviera in 2000, and across the board thereafter.

The Barchetta was revised in August 2003 ahead of its relaunch the following year, with some alterations inside and out. The most notable changes were the revised front spoiler and rear bumper. Engine revision decreased torque to 158 N⋅m (117 lb⋅ft). Production of the car eventually stopped in June 2005.

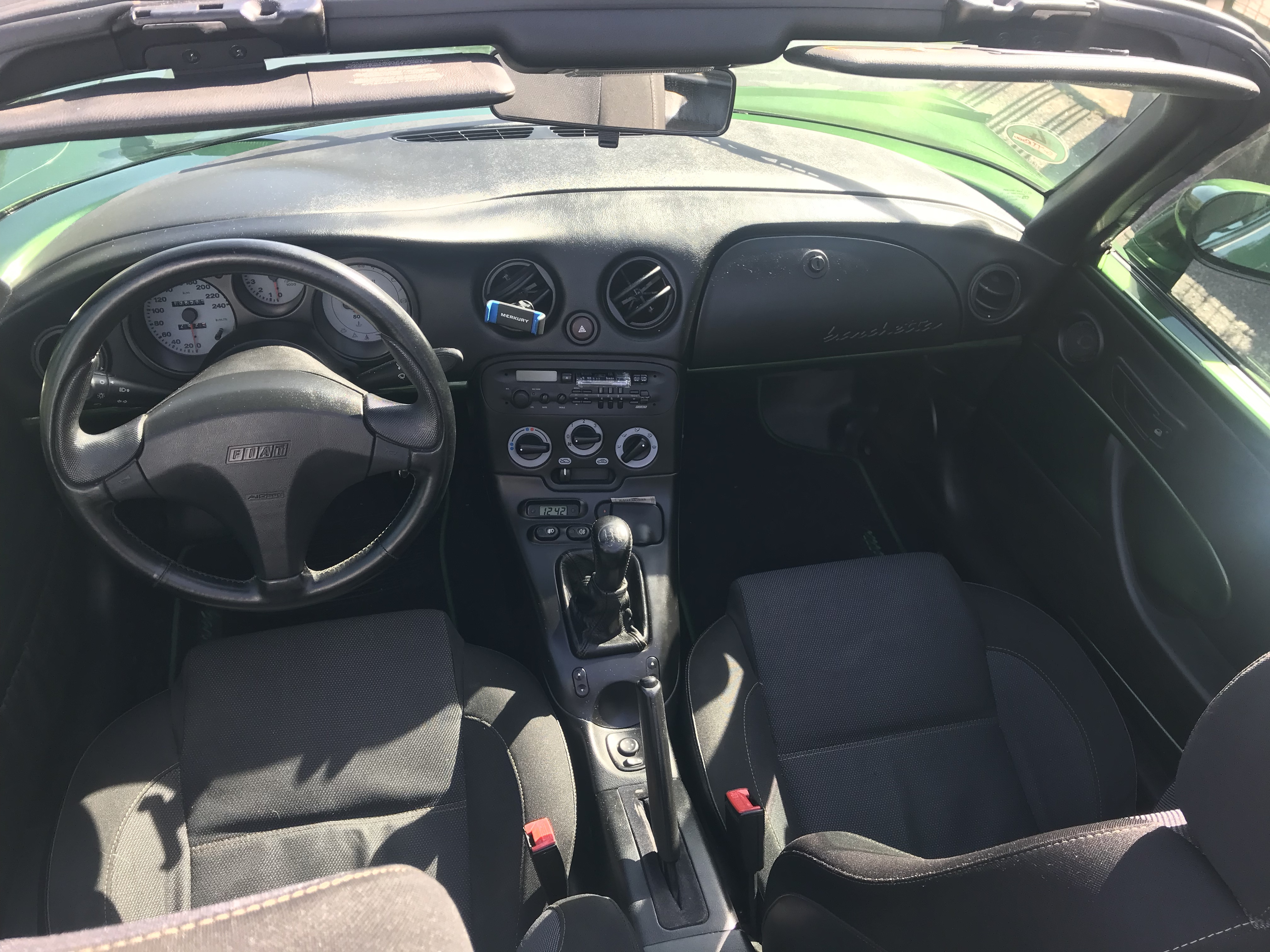
Interiors of a 1995 Fiat barchetta (1995-1996 cars are recognisable by the engraved Fiat logo on the steering wheel)

== Production ==
Car bodies were welded at ILCAS in Sparone Canavese, and final assembly was done in Chivasso by the coachbuilder Maggiora. After Maggiora's bankruptcy in May 2002, Fiat relocated production of the Barchetta to its Mirafiori plant and resumed production two years later. Around 57,800 cars were built up to 2005.

Production of the Barchetta was limited to LHD cars only, even though the car was marketed and sold in two RHD markets, the United Kingdom and Japan.

== Bertone concept car ==
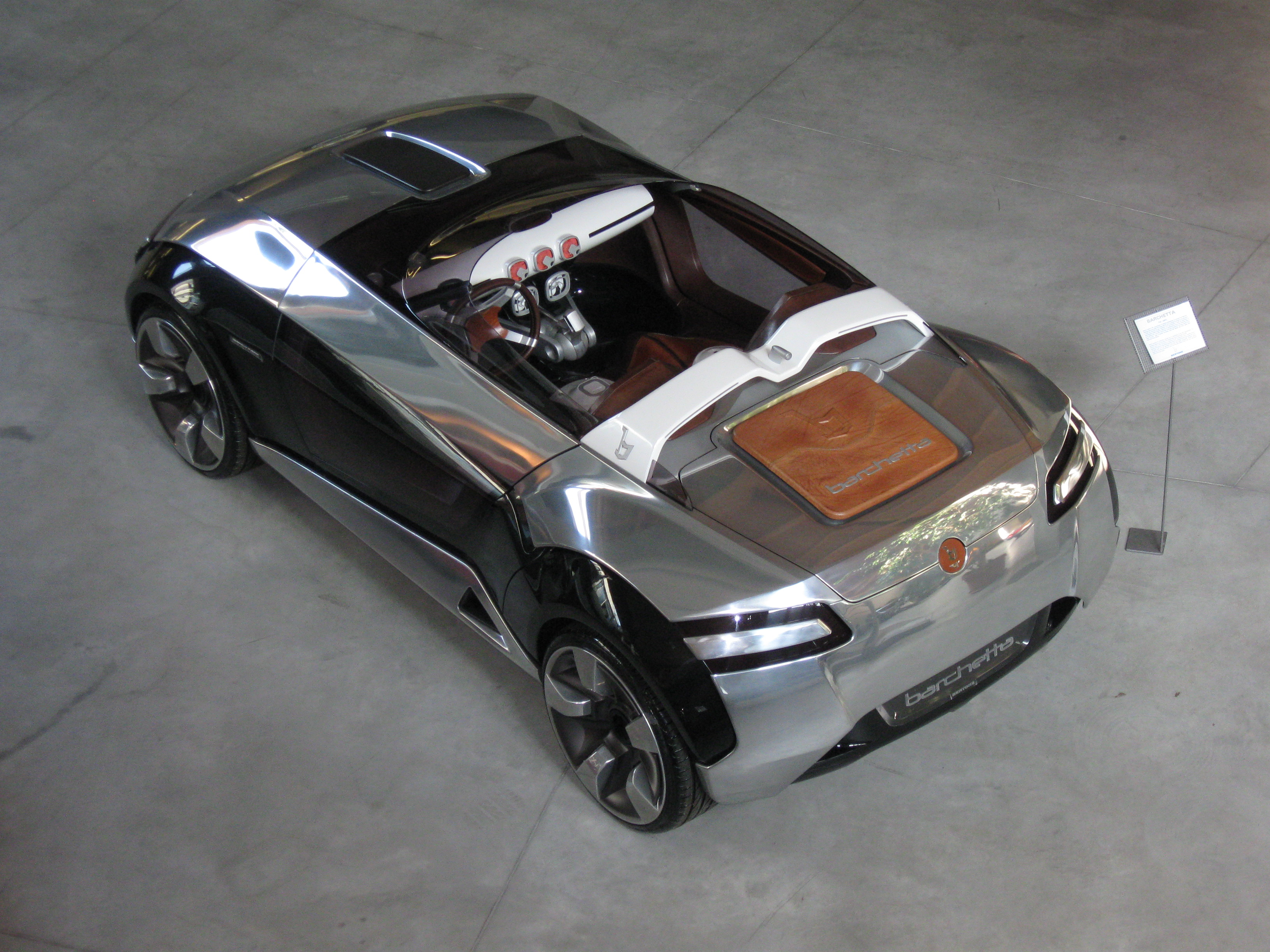
Fiat Barchetta by Bertone, 2007

The Italian styling house of Bertone created a one-off roadster show car for Fiat called the Barchetta in March 2007, at the Geneva Motor Show. Designed by David Wilkie.
