= 2008 County Championship =

English cricket tournament

- Dates: 16 April – 27 September 2008
- Administrator: England and Wales Cricket Board
- Cricket format: First-class cricket (4 days)
- Tournament format: League system
- Champions: Durham (1st title)
- Participants: 18
- Matches: 144
- Most runs: Murray Goodwin (1,343 for Sussex)
- Most wickets: James Tomlinson (67 for Hampshire)

The 2008 County Championship season, known as the LV County Championship for sponsorship reasons, was contested through two divisions: Division One and Division Two. Each team plays all the others in their division both home and away. The top two teams from Division Two are promoted to the first division for 2009, while the bottom two teams from Division 1 are relegated. Durham won the tournament, their first title, after beating Kent in their final match.

== Teams ==
Teams in the County Championship 2008:

Division One	Division Two
Durham	Derbyshire
Hampshire	Essex
Kent	Glamorgan
Lancashire	Gloucestershire
Nottinghamshire	Leicestershire
Somerset	Middlesex
Surrey	Northamptonshire
Sussex	Warwickshire
Yorkshire	Worcestershire

Icon
Team promoted from Division Two
Team relegated from Division One

== Points system ==
Fourteen points were awarded for each win, four points were awarded for a draw or abandonment. Defeats scored no points. Teams were awarded bonus points during the first 130 overs of their first innings; one bowling point for every three wickets taken (up to three points available), and one batting point gained when teams reached 200, 250, 300, 350 and 400 runs (up to five points available).

== Standings ==
=== Division One ===
	Team	P	W	L	D	A	Bat	Bowl	Ded	Pts
1	Durham	16	6	3	6	1	37	41	0	190
2	Nottinghamshire	16	5	3	7	1	37	43	0	182
3	Hampshire	16	5	4	7	0	33	47	0	178
4	Somerset	16	3	2	11	0	44	44	0	174
5	Lancashire	16	5	2	8	1	24	40	0	170
6	Sussex	16	2	2	12	0	45	38	0	159
7	Yorkshire	16	2	5	9	0	50	45	0	159
8	Kent	16	4	6	6	0	30	44	0	154
9	Surrey	16	0	5	10	1	45	36	1	124

= Champions
= Relegated

=== Division Two ===
	Team	P	W	L	D	A	Bat	Bowl	Ded	Pts
1	Warwickshire	16	5	0	11	0	53	46	0	213
2	Worcestershire	16	6	2	7	1	40	45	5	196
3	Middlesex	16	4	5	7	0	46	45	0	175
4	Northamptonshire	16	3	3	10	0	52	35	0	169
5	Essex	16	5	6	5	0	36	45	3	168
6	Derbyshire	16	4	3	9	0	33	46	4	167
7	Leicestershire	16	3	4	9	0	29	43	0	150
8	Glamorgan	16	3	5	7	1	26	36	0	136
9	Gloucestershire	16	0	5	11	0	42	38	2	122

= Champions
= Promoted

== Division One ==
=== Standings ===
P	Team	Pld	W	L	Tie	D	Aban	Bat	Bowl	Deduct	Pts	Promoted / Relegated
1	Durham	16	6	3	0	6	1	37	41	0	190	Winners of Championship
2	Nottinghamshire	16	5	3	0	7	1	37	43	0	182	
3	Hampshire	16	5	4	0	7	0	33	47	0	178	
4	Somerset	16	3	2	0	11	0	44	44	0	174	
5	Lancashire	16	5	2	0	8	1	24	40	0	170	
6	Sussex	16	2	2	0	12	0	45	38	0	159	
7	Yorkshire	16	2	5	0	9	0	50	45	0	159	
8	Kent	16	4	6	0	6	0	30	44	0	154	Relegated to Championship Division 2
9	Surrey	16	0	5	0	10	1	45	36	1	124	Relegated to Championship Division 2

Source: ,
Rules for classification: 1^{st} points; 2^{nd} matches won; 3^{rd} fewest defeats
P = Position; Pld = Matches played; W = Matches won; L = Matches lost; Tie = Matches tied; D = Matches drawn; Aban = Matches abandoned; Deduct = Points deducted; Pts = Points

== Division two ==
=== Standings ===
P	Team	Pld	W	L	Tie	D	Aban	Bat	Bowl	Deduct	Pts	Promoted / Relegated
1	Warwickshire	16	5	0	0	11	0	53	46	0	213	Promoted to Championship Division 1
2	Worcestershire	16	6	2	0	7	1	40	45	5	196	Promoted to Championship Division 1
3	Middlesex	16	4	5	0	7	0	46	45	0	175	
4	Northamptonshire	16	3	3	0	10	0	52	35	0	169	
5	Essex	16	5	6	0	5	0	36	45	3	168	
6	Derbyshire	16	4	3	0	9	0	33	46	4	167	
7	Leicestershire	16	3	4	0	9	0	29	43	0	150	
8	Glamorgan	16	3	5	0	7	1	26	36	0	136	
9	Gloucestershire	16	0	5	0	11	0	42	38	2	122	

Source: ,
Rules for classification: 1^{st} points; 2^{nd} matches won; 3^{rd} fewest defeats
P = Position; Pld = Matches played; W = Matches won; L = Matches lost; Tie = Matches tied; D = Matches drawn; Aban = Matches abandoned; Deduct = Points deducted; Pts = Points

== Records ==
Most runs
Aggregate	Average	Player	County
1343	58.39	Murray Goodwin	Sussex
1302	56.60	Hylton Ackerman	Leicestershire
1292	56.17	Jacques Rudolph	Yorkshire
1288	53.66	Stephen Moore	Worcestershire
1258	46.59	Marcus Trescothick	Somerset
1240	62.00	Jonathan Trott	Warwickshire
1235	61.75	Mark Ramprakash	Surrey
1232	56.00	Chris Rogers	Derbyshire
1162	64.55	Ravi Bopara	Essex
1150	47.91	Martin van Jaarsveld	Kent

Most wickets
Aggregate	Average	Player	County
67	24.76	James Tomlinson	Hampshire
64	26.43	Tim Murtagh	Middlesex
62	30.41	Adil Rashid	Yorkshire
60	22.35	Steve Harmison	Durham
59	18.74	Kabir Ali	Worcestershire
58	28.67	Charlie Shreck	Nottinghamshire
57	27.14	Graham Wagg	Derbyshire
55	22.50	Charl Langeveldt	Derbyshire
55	26.05	Robbie Joseph	Kent
50	19.62	Callum Thorp	Durham

== See also ==
- 2008 English cricket season
