= David Smit =

English cricketer

Personal information
- Born: 23 July 1976 (age 50); Nottingham, Nottinghamshire, England
- Batting: Right-handed
- Relatives: Jane Smit (sister)

Domestic team information
- Years: Team
- 1999–2002: Derbyshire Cricket Board

Career statistics
Competition	List A
Matches	5
Runs scored	94
Batting average	18.80
100s/50s	0/0
Top score	38
Catches/stumpings	3/–
- Source: Cricinfo, 13 October 2010

David Smit (born 23 July 1976) is an English cricketer. Smit is a right-handed batsman. He was born at Nottingham, Nottinghamshire. He was schooled at Nottingham High School.

Smit represented the Derbyshire Cricket Board in a single List A cricket. His debut List A match came against Wales Minor Counties in the 1999 NatWest Trophy. Between 1999 and 2002, he represented the Board in 5 List A matches, with his final match coming against the Middlesex Cricket Board in the 1st round of the 2003 Cheltenham & Gloucester Trophy which was played in 2002. In his 5 List A matches, he scored 94 runs at a batting average of 18.80, with a high score of 38. In the field he took 3 catches.

He currently plays club cricket for Ilkeston Rutland Cricket Club in the Derbyshire Premier Cricket League.

== Family ==
His sister Jane represented England in 21 Tests and 109 One Day Internationals.
