= Alan Gofton =

English cricketer

Personal information
- Full name: Alan Frederick Gofton
- Born: 4 October 1979 (age 47); Chesterfield, Derbyshire, England
- Batting: Right-handed
- Bowling: Right-arm medium

Domestic team information
- Years: Team
- 2000: Derbyshire Cricket Board
- 1999–2002: Oxford University

Career statistics
Competition	FC	LA
Matches	13	1
Runs scored	281	17
Batting average	17.56	17.00
100s/50s	–/–	–/–
Top score	47*	17
Balls bowled	1,191	60
Wickets	11	2
Bowling average	73.36	38.00
5 wickets in innings	–	–
10 wickets in match	–	–
Best bowling	3/41	2/76
Catches/stumpings	–/–	–/–
- Source: Cricinfo, 16 October 2010

Alan Frederick Gofton (born 4 October 1979) is an English former cricketer. Gofton was a right-handed batsman who bowled right-arm medium pace. He was born at Chesterfield, Derbyshire.

Gofton made his first-class debut for Oxford University against Nottinghamshire in 2000. From 1999 to 2002, he represented the university in 13 first-class matches, the last of which came against Gloucestershire. In his 13 first-class matches he scored 281 runs at a batting average of 17.56, with a high score of 47*. With the ball he took 11 wickets at a bowling average of 73.36, with best figures of 3/41.

Gofton represented the Derbyshire Cricket Board in a single List A match against Derbyshire in the 2000 NatWest Trophy. In only List A match, he scored 17 runs and with the ball he took 2 wickets for 76 runs.
