= Andreas Zapatinas =

Greek automobile designer and industrial designer

Andreas Zapatinas (born 1957) is a Greek automobile designer and industrial designer.

== Early life and education ==
Zapatinas was born in Athens. He studied at the Art Center College of Design in Pasadena, California, and graduated in 1986.

== Career ==
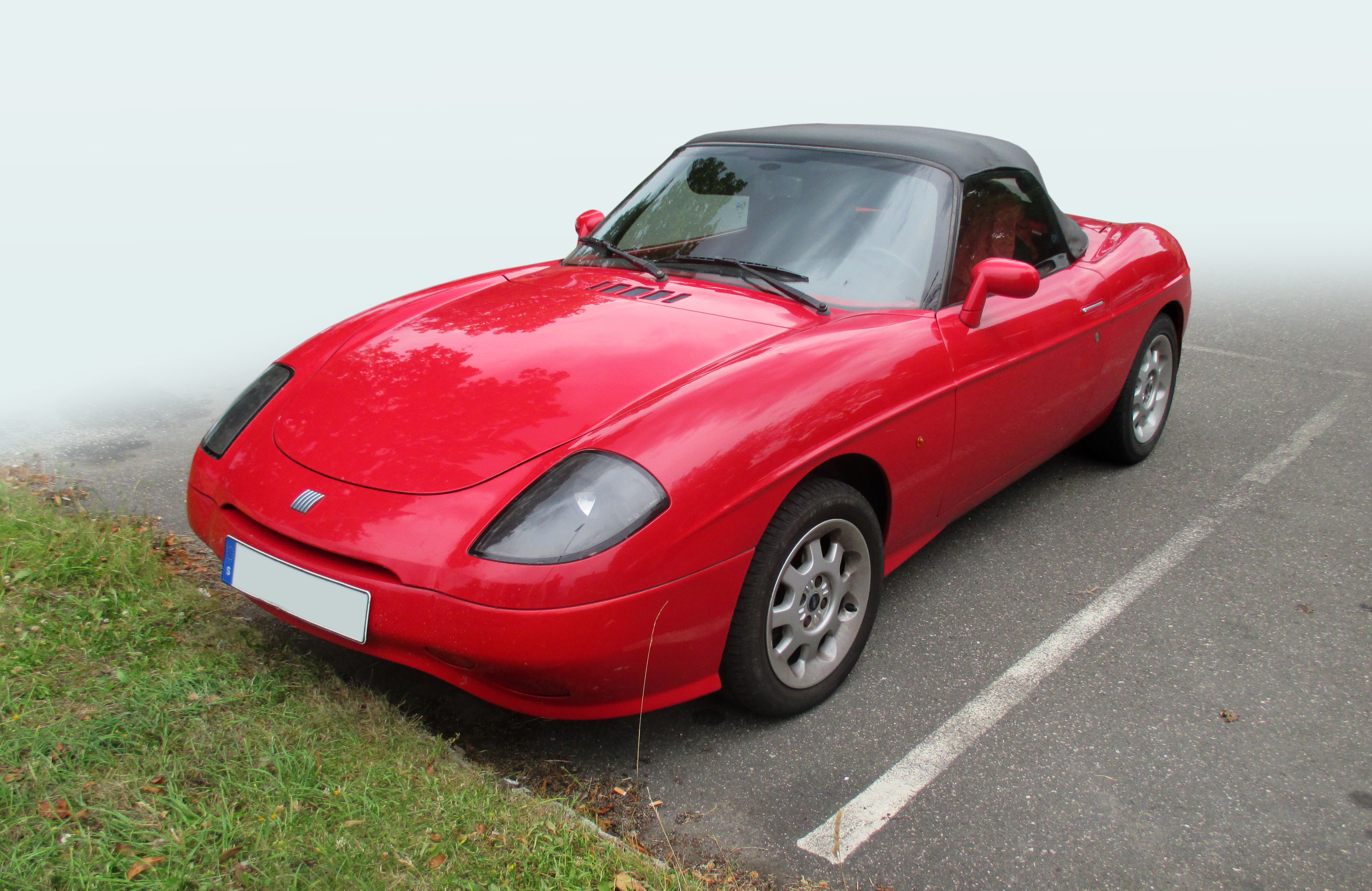
Fiat Barchetta designed by Zapatinas.

He worked at Centro Stile Fiat from 1988 until 1994, where he met Chris Bangle. Zapatinas was chief exterior designer of the Fiat Barchetta. He also contributed to the design of Fiat Coupé and Alfa Romeo 145.

In 1994 he followed Bangle to BMW. He designed the exterior of E59 project, a record CD aerodynamic study for a production 5 series 2 door coupe. The iconic design of the E59 had tremendous influence on most consecutive BMW by introducing a new surface theme and new volume architecture on the side of the vehicle. Also on the E59 Zapatinas introduced for the first time the "Angel Eyes" headlight concept with the help of Ludwig Deinzer, resident studio engineer. Later his proposal for the E46 compact, inspired by the legendary BMW 02 a 3 volume 2 door coupe, would be transformed after his departure from BMW to the basis for the first generation 1 series. The coupe and cabrio versions were very close to Zapatinas proposal that was used as the design basis during the 1 series development. He has been credited for the unique (for its time) rear end design of the Alfa Romeo 145. In 1998 he became chief designer at Centro Stile Alfa Romeo. He directed the following projects: 156 GTA, 147 GTA, closing phases for 156 Sportwagon and 147. Also directed the restyling of 166 and interior restyling of 156.

In 2002 Zapatinas joined Subaru as Head of Advanced Design. He is responsible for the interior of the Tribeca and directed the design of 3 subaru concept vehicles. Tokyo Motor Show 2003, Subaru R1e, Subaru Scrambler and Tokyo Motor Show 2005 Subaru TPH. At Subaru, he is often incorrectly credited with the controversial "spread wings grille" first introduced on the R2, and later the B9 Tribeca and the Impreza, Subaru have said that this concept was proposed before Zapatinas joined the Japanese company. This design created some controversy, and it was abandoned by Subaru. This controversy is said to have been related with Zapatinas's departure from Subaru in July 2006 when he was its chief designer.

In 2006, as Industrial Designer, Andreas Zapatinas started cooperating with Kleemann Lifts designing elevator cabins and doors. "We see the lift not as just a small square box that moves you up and down but as a means of transportation that provides a unique experience. It's not only the new curved shape and design. Above all, it is the different new feeling you get in the FUTURE TREND cabins. We design the lift as a high tech vehicle that provides you added sensations". With these sentences, Andreas Zapatinas, the designer of the Future cabins and doors, creates the concept of the new trend; the Future Trend.

As of 2010 he joined Changan Automobile, a Chinese automotive company with a design headquarters in Turin Italy.
