= George Moulds =

English cricketer

Personal information
- Full name: George William Moulds
- Born: 2 November 1983 (age 43); Derby, Derbyshire, England
- Batting: Right-handed
- Bowling: Right-arm medium-fast

Domestic team information
- Years: Team
- 2001: Derbyshire Cricket Board

Career statistics
Competition	LA
Matches	2
Runs scored	18
Batting average	18.00
100s/50s	–/–
Top score	18
Balls bowled	84
Wickets	3
Bowling average	15.66
5 wickets in innings	–
10 wickets in match	–
Best bowling	2/19
Catches/stumpings	1/–
- Source: Cricinfo, 14 October 2010

George William Moulds (born 2 November 1983) is an English cricketer. Moulds is a right-handed batsman who bowls right-arm medium-fast. He was born at Derby, Derbyshire.

Moulds represented the Derbyshire Cricket Board in 2 List A cricket matches. These came against Wiltshire and Cambridgeshire in the 2001 Cheltenham & Gloucester Trophy. In his 2 List A matches, he scored 18 runs at a batting average of 18.00, with a high score of 18, while in the field he also took a single catch. With the ball he took 3 wickets at a bowling average of 15.66, with best figures of 2/19.

Moulds currently plays club cricket for Ilkeston Rutland Cricket Club in the Derbyshire Premier Cricket League.
