= Joe Greenhalgh =

English cricketer

Personal information
- Full name: Joseph Andrew Greenhalgh
- Born: 9 January 1985 (age 41); Chesterfield, Derbyshire, England
- Batting: Right-handed
- Bowling: Right-arm off spin

Domestic team information
- Years: Team
- 2001: Derbyshire Cricket Board

Career statistics
Competition	LA
Matches	1
Runs scored	1
Batting average	1.00
100s/50s	–/–
Top score	1
Balls bowled	42
Wickets	1
Bowling average	49.00
5 wickets in innings	–
10 wickets in match	–
Best bowling	1/49
Catches/stumpings	–/–
- Source: Cricinfo, 13 October 2010

Joseph Andrew Greenhalgh (born 9 January 1985) is an English cricketer. Greenhalgh is a right-handed batsman who bowls right-arm off break. He was born at Chesterfield, Derbyshire.

Greenhalgh represented the Derbyshire Cricket Board in a single List A match against Bedfordshire in the 1st round of the 2002 Cheltenham & Gloucester Trophy which was played in 2001. In his only List A match, he scored a single run and took a single wicket at cost of 49 runs.
