= Peter Camm =

English cricketer

Personal information
- Full name: Peter Camm
- Born: 19 July 1980 (age 46); Chesterfield, Derbyshire, England
- Batting: Right-handed
- Bowling: Right-arm medium

Domestic team information
- Years: Team
- 1999–2001: Derbyshire Cricket Board

Career statistics
Competition	LA
Matches	3
Runs scored	20
Batting average	10.00
100s/50s	–/–
Top score	20
Balls bowled	143
Wickets	4
Bowling average	36.25
5 wickets in innings	–
10 wickets in match	–
Best bowling	4/52
Catches/stumpings	–/–
- Source: Cricinfo, 15 October 2010

Peter Camm (born 19 July 1980) is an English cricketer. Camm is a right-handed batsman who bowls right-arm medium pace. He was born at Chesterfield, Derbyshire.

Camm represented the Derbyshire Cricket Board in 3 List A cricket matches. These came against Wales Minor Counties in the 1999 NatWest Trophy, Wiltshire in the 2001 Cheltenham & Gloucester Trophy and Bedfordshire in the 1st round of the 2002 Cheltenham & Gloucester Trophy which was held in 2002. In his 3 List A matches, he scored 20 runs at a batting average of 10.00, with a high score of 20. With the ball he took 4 wickets at a bowling average of 36.25, with best figures of 4/52.

Camm currently plays club cricket for Matlock Cricket Club in the Derbyshire Premier Cricket League.
