= Matthews Hall =

Matthews Hall may refer to:

== Canada ==
- Matthews Hall (London, Ontario), a Canadian Accredited Independent School

== United States ==
- Matthews Hall (Colorado), Episcopal divinity school in Golden City, Colorado 1872–1878
- Matthews Hall (Harvard University), in Massachusetts
- Matthews Hall (Tempe, Arizona), listed on the NRHP in Maricopa County, Arizona

== See also ==
- Matthew Hall (disambiguation)
