= Daniel Pesina =

American actor

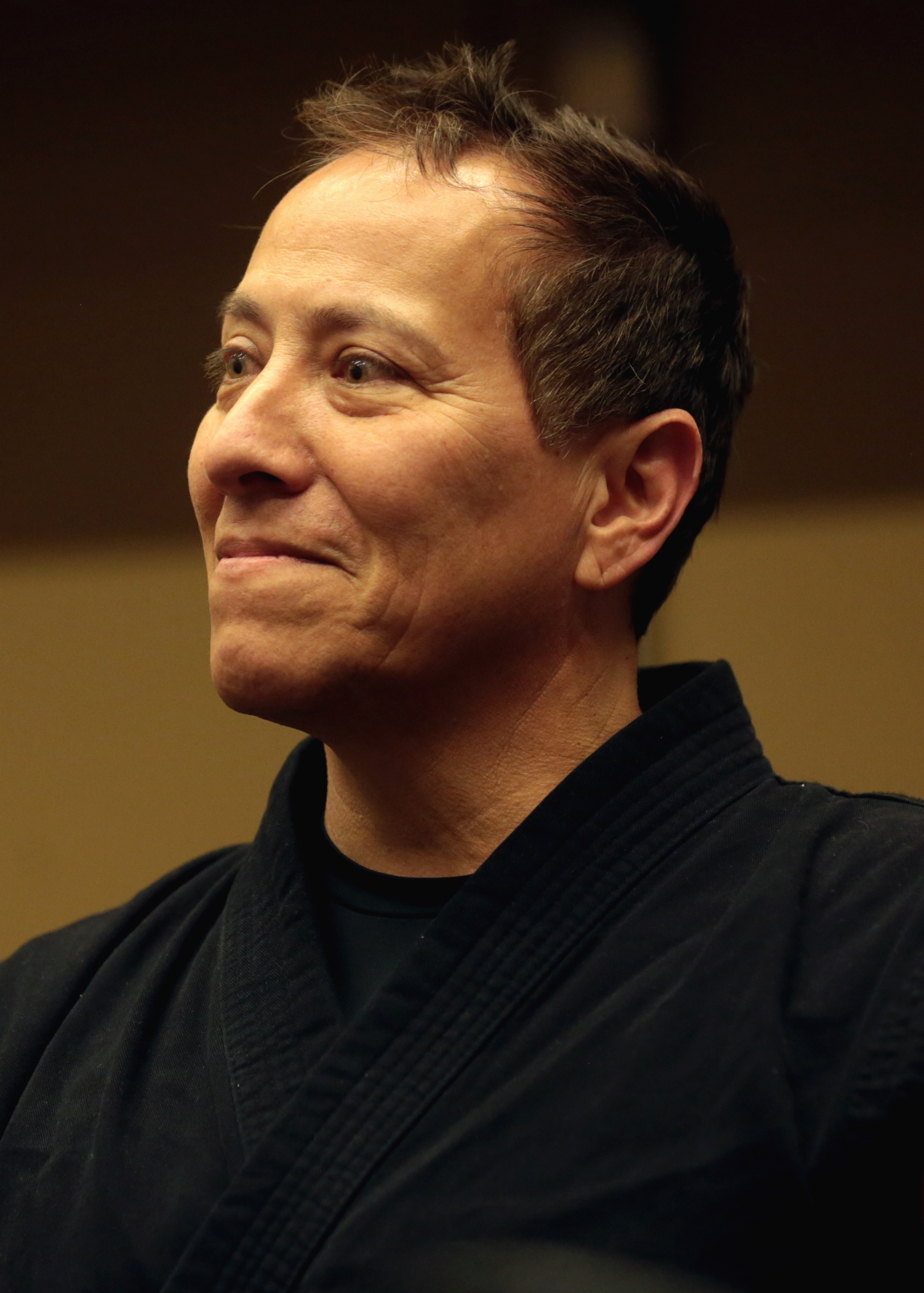
- Daniel Pesina in 2017
- Born: December 1, 1959 (age 66); Chicago, Illinois, U.S.
- Occupations: Martial artist Actor
- Years active: 1990–present
- Family: Carlos Pesina (brother)

Daniel Pesina (born December 1, 1959) is an American motion capture video game martial artist, and a former freelance employee of Midway.

Pesina was born in Chicago, Illinois to Mexican born parents and has studied martial arts since the age of 10.

Pesina started his work as an extra in martial arts films, appearing as one of Shredder's foot soldiers in the 1991 film Teenage Mutant Ninja Turtles II: The Secret of the Ooze.

A lifelong friend of designer John Tobias, Pesina was brought by him to work in a fighting game featuring digitized characters, 1992's Mortal Kombat, where he played Johnny Cage and ninja characters Scorpion, Sub-Zero and Reptile, and served as a martial arts coordinator for the game. Then in Mortal Kombat II he reprised his roles from the previous game, also playing the roles of Smoke, and Noob Saibot.

After his participation in MKII, Pesina parted from Midway, and sued them for unpaid royalties from his likeness being used in the console versions of the first two MK games, a case which he lost by summary judgment. For this reason, from MK3 on his characters were played by different actors: John Turk would take over Sub-Zero in Mortal Kombat 3 and the rest of the ninjas in Ultimate Mortal Kombat 3, while Johnny Cage would be played by Chris Alexander in Mortal Kombat Trilogy. During this time, Pesina promoted BloodStorm (a fighting game designed by a former Midway employee who assisted in the making of Mortal Kombat series) in an advert, dressed up as Johnny Cage, which led to a long-standing rumor that Pesina had been fired from Midway over his participation in promoting BloodStorm. He and his younger brother Carlos also secretly worked on Tattoo Assassins, another competing game to Mortal Kombat. Carlos Pesina remained with Midway until the company's closure, and as of 2019, still works at NetherRealm Studios.

He played a hitman in the 1996 martial arts movie Book of Swords, which also starred fellow MK actors Katalin Zamiar, Ho-Sung Pak and Richard Divizio. Daniel and Carlos also appeared in a videogame-based comedy film entitled Press Start, which was released to DVD on September 25, 2007. In it, Daniel's character is called Sasori, which is Japanese for "Scorpion". As of 2004, Daniel is a teacher at the Chicago Wushuguan School.
