= Matt Hall =

Matt Hall may refer to:

- Matt Hall (American football) (born 1990), American gridiron football player
- Matt Hall (baseball) (born 1993), American baseball player
- Matt Hall (pilot) (born 1971), Australian pilot
- Matt Hall (politician), American politician from Michigan

== See also ==
- Matthew Hall (disambiguation)
