= Russell Sexton =

English cricketer

Personal information
- Full name: Russell John Sexton
- Born: 9 October 1978 (age 48); Derby, Derbyshire, England
- Batting: Right-handed
- Role: Wicketkeeper

Domestic team information
- Years: Team
- 2002: Derbyshire Cricket Board

Career statistics
Competition	LA
Matches	1
Runs scored	1
Batting average	–
100s/50s	–/–
Top score	1*
Balls bowled	–
Wickets	–
Bowling average	–
5 wickets in innings	–
10 wickets in match	–
Best bowling	–
Catches/stumpings	1/–
- Source: Cricinfo, 13 October 2010

Russell John Sexton (born 9 October 1978) is a former English cricketer. Sexton was a right-handed batsman who played primarily as a wicketkeeper. He was born in Derby, Derbyshire.

Sexton represented the Derbyshire Cricket Board in a single List A match against the Middlesex Cricket Board in the first round of the 2003 Cheltenham & Gloucester Trophy, played in 2002. In his only List A match, he scored a single run and behind the stumps he took a single catch.
