= James Ede =

English cricketer

Personal information
- Full name: James Luke Ede
- Born: 19 September 1984 (age 42); Burton-on-Trent, Staffordshire, England
- Batting: Right-handed
- Bowling: Right-arm medium

Domestic team information
- Years: Team
- 2002: Derbyshire Cricket Board

Career statistics
Competition	LA
Matches	1
Runs scored	10
Batting average	10.00
100s/50s	–/–
Top score	10
Balls bowled	30
Wickets	1
Bowling average	20.00
5 wickets in innings	–
10 wickets in match	–
Best bowling	1/20
Catches/stumpings	–/–
- Source: Cricinfo, 9 October 2010

James Luke Ede (born 19 September 1984) is an English cricketer. Ede is a right-handed batsman who bowls right-arm medium pace. He was born at Burton-on-Trent, Staffordshire.

Ede played a single List-A match for the Derbyshire Cricket Board in the 1st round of the 2003 Cheltenham & Gloucester Trophy against the Middlesex Cricket Board, a match which was played in 2002. During the match he scored 10 runs and took a single wicket, that of Rajesh Rao.

In local domestic cricket, Ede plays for Quarndon Cricket Club who play in the Derbyshire Premier Cricket League.
