= Jamie Benstead =

English cricketer (born 1979)

Personal information
- Full name: James Richard Benstead
- Born: 8 March 1979 (age 47); Burton-on-Trent, Staffordshire, England
- Batting: Right-handed
- Bowling: Right-arm medium

Domestic team information
- Years: Team
- 2004–2006: Staffordshire
- 2000–2002: Derbyshire Cricket Board

Career statistics
Competition	List A
Matches	7
Runs scored	170
Batting average	24.28
100s/50s	–/2
Top score	65
Balls bowled	19
Wickets	–
Bowling average	–
5 wickets in innings	–
10 wickets in match	–
Best bowling	–
Catches/stumpings	3/–
- Source: Cricinfo, 4 June 2011

James Richard Benstead (born 8 March 1979) is an English cricketer. Benstead is a right-handed batsman who bowls right-arm medium. He was born in Burton-on-Trent, Staffordshire.

Benstead made his List A debut for the Derbyshire Cricket Board in the 2000 NatWest Trophy against the Gloucestershire Cricket Board. He played 5 further List A matches for the Board, the last coming against the Middlesex Cricket Board in the 1st round of the 2003 Cheltenham & Gloucester Trophy which was held in 2002. In his 6 List A matches for the Board, he scored 165 runs at an average of 27.50, making 2 half centuries and a high score of 65. His highest score came against Bedfordshire in the 2002 Cheltenham & Gloucester Trophy.

He later joined Staffordshire, who he played Minor counties cricket for from 2004 to 2006, making 11 Minor Counties Championship appearances and a single MCCA Knockout Trophy appearance. He played a single List A match for Staffordshire, in the 2005 Cheltenham & Gloucester Trophy against Surrey. In this match, he scored 5 runs before being dismissed by James Ormond.
