= John Trueman =

English cricketer

Personal information
- Full name: John Fieldston Trueman
- Born: 29 October 1968 (age 58); Nottingham, Nottinghamshire, England
- Batting: Right-handed
- Bowling: Right-arm off break

Domestic team information
- Years: Team
- 2002: Derbyshire Cricket Board

Career statistics
| Competition | LA |
|---|---|
| Matches | 1 |
| Runs scored | 24 |
| Batting average | 24.00 |
| 100s/50s | –/– |
| Top score | 24 |
| Balls bowled | 60 |
| Wickets | – |
| Bowling average | – |
| 5 wickets in innings | – |
| 10 wickets in match | – |
| Best bowling | – |
| Catches/stumpings | 1/– |
- Source: Cricinfo, 13 October 2010

John Fieldston Trueman (born 29 October 1968) is an English cricketer. Trueman is a right-handed batsman who bowls right-arm off break. He was born at Nottingham, Nottinghamshire.

Trueman represented the Derbyshire Cricket Board in a single List A match against the Middlesex Cricket Board in the 1st round of the 2003 Cheltenham & Gloucester Trophy which was played in 2002. In his only List A match, he scored 24 runs and took a single catch in the field. With the ball he bowled 10 wicketless overs.

John won the national cup with Sandiacre by beating Bath at Lords winning man of the match award in 2003.

He currently plays club cricket for Ilkeston Rutland.
