= David Dodd (disambiguation) =

David Dodd (1895–1988) was an American educator, financial analyst and author.

David Dodd may also refer to:

- David Dodd (soccer) (born 1985), Australian football (soccer) player
- David Owen Dodd (1846–1864), American spy

== See also ==
- David Dodds (disambiguation)
