= Kevin Hollis =

English cricketer

Personal information
- Full name: Kevin John Hollis
- Born: 5 January 1983 (age 43); Derby, Derbyshire, England
- Batting: Left-handed
- Role: Wicketkeeper

Domestic team information
- Years: Team
- 2000–2001: Derbyshire Cricket Board

Career statistics
Competition	LA
Matches	4
Runs scored	18
Batting average	9.00
100s/50s	–/–
Top score	7*
Balls bowled	–
Wickets	–
Bowling average	–
5 wickets in innings	–
10 wickets in match	–
Best bowling	–
Catches/stumpings	1/2
- Source: Cricinfo, 14 October 2010

Kevin John Hollis (born 5 January 1983) is an English cricketer. Hollis is a left-handed batsman who plays primarily as a wicketkeeper. He was born at Derby, Derbyshire.

Hollis represented the Derbyshire Cricket Board in List A cricket. His debut List A match came against Derbyshire in the 2000 NatWest Trophy. From 2000 to 2001, he represented the Board in 4 matches, the last of which came against Bedfordshire in the 1st round of the 2002 Cheltenham & Gloucester Trophy which was held in 2001. In his 4 List A matches, he scored 18 runs at a batting average of 9.00, with a high score of 7*. Behind the stumps he took a single catch and made 2 stumpings.
