= Pervez Iqbal =

Personal information
- Full name: Pervez Iqbal
- Born: 26 December 1975; Rawalpindi, Punjab, Pakistan
- Died: 11 March 2002 (aged 26); Rawalpindi, Punjab, Pakistan
- Batting: Left-handed
- Bowling: Right-arm medium

Domestic team information
- Years: Team
- 2000: Derbyshire Cricket Board
- 1995/96: Rawalpindi A
- 1994/95-1995/96: Rawalpindi B
- 1993/94-2000/01: Rawalpindi

Career statistics
Competition	FC	LA
Matches	20	20
Runs scored	602	212
Batting average	20.06	15.14
100s/50s	–/4	–/1
Top score	76	56
Balls bowled	2,412	866
Wickets	46	25
Bowling average	25.71	22.32
5 wickets in innings	1	1
10 wickets in match	–	–
Best bowling	1/59	5/22
Catches/stumpings	2/–	4/–
- Source: Cricinfo, 16 October 2010

Pervez Iqbal (26 December 1975 – 11 March 2002) was a Pakistani cricketer. Iqbal was a left-handed batsman who bowled with his right-arm medium pace. He was born at Rawalpindi, Punjab.

Iqbal made his first-class debut for Rawalpindi against Faisalabad in 1993/94 season. Iqbal represented the main Rawalpindi team in first-class cricket from the 1993/94 to 2000/01, as well as Rawalpindi B from 1994/95-1995/96. His final first-class match came for the main Rawalpindi team against Lahore Blues in 2001. In total, from 1993/94 to 2000/01 he played 20 first-class matches. In these matches he scored a total of 602 runs at a batting average of 20.06, with 4 half centuries and a high score of 76. With the ball he took 46 wickets at a bowling average of 25.71, with a single five wicket haul which resulted in his best figures of 5/59.

Iqbal also made his debut in List A cricket for Rawalpindi in the 1993/94 season against Faisalabad. Iqbal represented the main Rawalpindi team in List A cricket 11 times from the 1993/94 to 1999/2000 season. In addition, he also represented Rawalpindi A in 8 matches during the 1995/96 season. His final List-A match for a Rawalpindi team came against Islamabad in March 2000. During the 2000 English cricket season, Iqbal played a single List A match for the Derbyshire Cricket Board in the 2000 NatWest Trophy against the Gloucestershire Cricket Board. In his total of 20 List A matches, he scored 212 runs at an average of 15.14, with a single half century high score of 56. With the ball he took 25 wickets at an average of 22.32, with a single five wicket haul which gave him best figures of 5/22.

Iqbal died in Rawalpindi, Punjab on 11 March 2002 from a rare pollen allergy.
