= Press Start =

- Theatrical film poster
- Directed by: Ed Glaser
- Written by: Kevin Folliard
- Produced by: Ed Glaser
- Starring: Joshua Stafford; Peter Davis; Daniel Pesina; Carlos Pesina
- Cinematography: Ed Glaser
- Edited by: Ed Glaser
- Music by: Jake Kaufman
- Production company: Dark Maze Studios
- Distributed by: Dark Maze Studios
- Release date: September 25, 2007 (DVD premiere)
- Running time: 100 minutes
- Country: United States
- Language: English

Press Start is a 2007 independent film produced by Dark Maze Studios. It stars Joshua Stafford, Peter Davis, Daniel Pesina, and Carlos Pesina. The film is a video game parody adventure comedy. It was released on DVD on September 25, 2007.

== Production ==
The film was shot in Champaign and Chicago, Illinois. Press Start is scored by American video game music composer Jake Kaufman.

The two characters played by Daniel and Carlos Pesina in Press Start, Sasori and Lei-Gong, are pastiches of their respective characters in the original Mortal Kombat game, Scorpion and Raiden. A sequel, Press Start 2 Continue, was released in 2011.

== Focus ==
Press Start focuses its parodic tone primarily toward the era of 8-bit and 16-bit video games, but references more modern games as well. Games parodied range from Donkey Kong to Halo. The film also satirizes all aspects of gaming, including collectible card games, Saturday morning cartoons, comic books, and trends of turning games into breakfast cereals.

== Synopsis ==
Press Start tells the story of a suburban youth in a videogame world who discovers his adventurous, if berserk, destiny when he's recruited by an ill-tempered ninja and a tough-as-nails space soldier to save the world from a tyrannical, but comically insecure, sorcerer.

== Cast ==
- Joshua Stafford as Zack Nimbus
- Peter A. Davis as Count Nefarious Vile
- Daniel Pesina as Sasori
- Carlos Pesina as Lei Gong
- Lauren Chambers as Sam
- Al Morrison as Lin-Ku
- J.W. Morrissette as Johnson
- Andy Dallas as Shopkeeper
- Michael Kleppin as G. Fourman
- Ben McDuffee as Telegram Man
- J.R. Thomas as Uncle Lou
- Meagan Benz as Zippy (voice)
- Jane F. Cox as Life Lady
- Arin Hanson as Forest Guardian (voice)
- Jennifer Zahn as Villager

=== Bonus Levels/Adventures ===
While in production and post-production, a series of web shorts called Press Start: Bonus Levels (known as Press Start Adventures following the movie's release) were released on the film's website and Newgrounds. The series was created and animated by screenwriter Kevin Folliard and produced by Press Start director Ed Glaser. The pilot episode was directed by Folliard, while the following episodes were directed by Glaser. Original music is composed by Jake Kaufman.

They premiered on April 28, 2006. Since, there's been a new episode on the last Friday of every following month. The episodes feature numerous visual gags and video game parodies.

The cartoons were created as a way to generate hype for the feature film by introducing people to the world, characters, and humor of Press Start. They are also noted by their lack of budget constraints allowing more artistic freedom to be taken with the action and effects than that seen in the feature film. Back story, inside jokes, and running gags are further flushed out in the animations than what could be used in the film.

A number of notable videogame voice actors have guest starred in the series as well, including Mortal Kombat's John Turk (who took over the ninja roles portrayed by Pesina), and David Humphrey, the original voice of Shadow the Hedgehog.

The animations take place before the events of the movie, similar to two made-for-DVD animated prequels: Van Helsing: The London Assignment and The Chronicles of Riddick: Dark Fury. The animations started out being nonlinear and do not progress after one another. Notably missing is the character of Zack Nimbus who, in terms of the film, has yet to be made aware of his destiny. However, on November 24, 2006, the shorts began a five-part miniseries which led directly into the feature film.

The shorts have since been hosted on the comedy media website That Guy with the Glasses, continuing new episodes now taking place after the film's conclusion, now known as Press Start Adventures. Count Vile is now depicted as being in Hell, and the character Zack Nimbus appears, as well.

== Critical reception ==
PC Gamer wrote that the film was "a surprisingly well-written parody of video game conventions". Movie Cynics makes note that if a filmmaker were to do everything possible to make a bad movie, Ed Glaser has succeeded and that Glaser has not only made a bad movie, but he has made an "awesomely bad movie...that pokes fun at video games." And in its being so bad, the "end result was a film that is a quintessential awesomely bad movie that is full of videogame references and is fun from beginning to end."

== Sequel ==
In 2011, a direct-to-video sequel was made entitled Press Start 2 Continue, also produced and directed by Ed Glaser.
