= Simon Moore (Derbyshire cricketer) =

English cricketer

Simon Oliver Moore
Personal information
- Full name: Simon Oliver Moore
- Born: 15 June 1974 (age 52); Oldham, Greater Manchester
- Batting: Right-handed
- Bowling: Right-arm medium

Domestic team information
- Years: Team
- 1999 & 2002: Derbyshire Cricket Board

Career statistics
Competition	LA
Matches	2
Runs scored	22
Batting average	11.00
100s/50s	–/–
Top score	12
Balls bowled	120
Wickets	4
Bowling average	28.25
5 wickets in innings	2/46
10 wickets in match	–
Best bowling	–
Catches/stumpings	1/–
- Source: Cricinfo, 13 October 2010

Simon Oliver Moore (born 15 June 1974) is a former English cricketer. Moore was a right-handed batsman who bowled right-arm medium pace. He was born in Oldham, Greater Manchester.

Moore represented the Derbyshire Cricket Board in 2 List A matches. The first came against Wales Minor Counties in the 1999 NatWest Trophy. His second came against the Middlesex Cricket Board in the 1st round of the 2003 Cheltenham & Gloucester Trophy which was played in 2002. In his 2 List A matches, he scored 22 runs at a batting average of 11, with a high score of 13. In the field he took a single catch. With the ball he took 4 wickets at a bowling average of 28.25, with best figures of 2/46.
