= Dave Hallack =

Zimbabwean-born English cricketer

Personal information
- Full name: David Hallack
- Born: 22 January 1966 (age 60); Bulawayo, Zimbabwe
- Batting: Right-handed
- Bowling: Right-arm medium

Domestic team information
- Years: Team
- 2002: Derbyshire Cricket Board

Career statistics
Competition	LA
Matches	1
Runs scored	9
Batting average	9.00
100s/50s	–/–
Top score	9
Balls bowled	–
Wickets	–
Bowling average	–
5 wickets in innings	–
10 wickets in match	–
Best bowling	–
Catches/stumpings	–/–
- Source: Cricinfo, 14 October 2010

David Hallack (born 22 January 1966) is a Zimbabwean-born English cricketer. He is a right-handed batsman who bowls right-arm medium pace. He was born in Bulawayo, Zimbabwe.

Hallack represented the Derbyshire Cricket Board in a single List A match against the Middlesex Cricket Board in the 1st round of the 2003 Cheltenham & Gloucester Trophy, which was played in 2002. During this match he scored 9 runs.

Hallack currently plays club cricket for Ockbrook and Borrowash Cricket Club in the Derbyshire Premier Cricket League.
