= David Dodds (cricketer) =

English cricketer (born 1981)

Personal information
- Full name: David Henry Dodd
- Born: 13 November 1981 (age 44); Manchester, England
- Batting: Right-handed
- Bowling: left-arm Seam bowling

Domestic team information
- Years: Team
- 2000–2001: Derbyshire Cricket Board

Career statistics
Competition	LA
Matches	3
Runs scored	0
Batting average	–
100s/50s	–/–
Top score	0*
Balls bowled	114
Wickets	–
Bowling average	–
5 wickets in innings	–
10 wickets in match	–
Best bowling	–
Catches/stumpings	–/–
- Source: Cricinfo, 14 October 2010

David Henry Dodd (born 13 November 1981) in Manchester is a former English cricketer. Dodd was a right-handed batsman who bowled left-arm Seam bowling.

He represented the Derbyshire Cricket Board in three List A matches. These came against the Gloucestershire Cricket Board and Derbyshire in the 2000 NatWest Trophy and against Cambridgeshire in the 2001 Cheltenham & Gloucester Trophy.
