= Carl Eyden =

English cricketer

Personal information
- Full name: Carl Dennis Eyden
- Born: 9 November 1980 (age 46); Burton upon Trent, Staffordshire, England
- Batting: Right-handed
- Bowling: Right-arm medium-fast

Domestic team information
- Years: Team
- 2001: Derbyshire Cricket Board

Career statistics
Competition	LA
Matches	3
Runs scored	5
Batting average	1.66
100s/50s	–/–
Top score	3
Balls bowled	38
Wickets	1
Bowling average	60.00
5 wickets in innings	–
10 wickets in match	–
Best bowling	1/60
Catches/stumpings	–/–
- Source: Cricinfo, 14 October 2010

Carl Dennis Eyden (born 9 November 1980) is an English cricketer. Eyden is a right-handed batsman who bowls right-arm medium-fast. He was born at Burton upon Trent, Staffordshire.

Eyden represented the Derbyshire Cricket Board in 3 List A matches during 2001. These came against Wiltshire and Cambridgeshire in the 2001 Cheltenham & Gloucester Trophy and against Bedfordshire in the 1st round of the 2002 Cheltenham & Gloucester Trophy which was held in 2001. In his 3 List A matches, he took a single wicket at a bowling average of 60.00, with best figures of 1/60.
