= Matthew Hall (footballer) =

Scottish footballer

Personal information
- Full name: Matthew Hall
- Date of birth: 1884
- Place of birth: Renfrew, Scotland
- Height: 5 ft 8 in (1.73 m)
- Position: Inside forward

Senior career*
| Years | Team | Apps | (Gls) |
| 1904–1906 | St Mirren | 37 | (6) |
| 1906–1907 | Sunderland | 8 | (0) |
| 1907–1910 | Clyde | 40 | (4) |
| 1910 | Alloa Athletic | | |
| 1910–1911 | Third Lanark | 1 | (0) |
- * Club domestic league appearances and goals

Matthew Hall (born 1884) was a Scottish professional footballer who played as an inside forward for Sunderland.
