= William W. Doar =

American politician

Member of the South Carolina House of Representatives for Georgetown County
- In office 1966–1972

Member of the South Carolina Senate from the 34th district
- In office 1972–1988

Personal details
- Born: March 9, 1935 (age 91) Rock Hill, South Carolina
- Party: Democratic
- Occupation: lawyer

William Walter Doar, Jr. (born March 9, 1935) was an American lawyer and politician in the state of South Carolina. He served in the South Carolina Senate as a member of the Democratic Party from 1972 to 1988 and in the South Carolina House of Representatives from 1966 to 1972, representing Georgetown County, South Carolina.
