= Peter Davies (English cricketer) =

English cricketer (born 1976)

Personal information
- Full name: Peter George Thomas Davies
- Born: 1 September 1976 (age 50); Derby, Derbyshire, England
- Batting: Right-handed
- Role: Wicketkeeper

Domestic team information
- Years: Team
- 2000: Derbyshire Cricket Board

Career statistics
Competition	LA
Matches	1
Runs scored	0
Batting average	0.00
100s/50s	–/–
Top score	0
Balls bowled	–
Wickets	–
Bowling average	–
5 wickets in innings	–
10 wickets in match	–
Best bowling	–
Catches/stumpings	–/–
- Source: CricketArchive, 14 October 2010

Peter George Thomas Davies (born 1 September 1976) is a former English cricketer. Davies was a right-handed batsman who played primarily as a wicketkeeper. He was born at Derby, Derbyshire.

Davies represented the Derbyshire Cricket Board in a single List A match against Derbyshire in the 2000 NatWest Trophy. During this match he was dismissed for a duck by Tim Munton.
