= Peter Barrett Davis =

American automobile designer (born 1958)

Peter B. Davis
- Born: Peter Barrett Davis; 1956 (age 69–70)
- Occupation: Automobile designer

Peter Barrett Davis (born in 1956) is an American automotive designer. He is especially known for designing car interiors, mainly at General Motors and Fiat Auto.

== Career at General Motors ==
After completing his education in 1981 at the ArtCenter College of Design in Pasadena, California, Davis began his career at General Motors' European branch, at Opel in Rüsselsheim, designing the interiors of the Vectra A, the Omega A, and the Corsa B models. From 1985 until his departure at the end of 1989, he was the deputy director of the interior design studio at Opel.

== Career at Fiat Auto ==
From 1990 until 1999, Davis worked at Fiat Auto in Turin, where he designed the interiors of the 1993 Punto, Bravo/Brava, Barchetta, Seicento, and the 1998 Multipla.

In addition to these projects, in 1993, Davis became Director of Design at Centro Stile Fiat and Lancia. For the Multipla, the design of which he fully supervised and of which he was named as one of the spiritual fathers, he followed Raymond Loewy's MAYA philosophy: 'Most Advanced, Yet Acceptable', which deeply influenced its development.

== Second stint at GM ==
In July 1999, Davis returned to General Motors in Detroit, where he took on the role of Studio Design Director, responsible for interior designs for global models and later also for high-performance and prestige cars. He collaborated on interiors for brands such as Cadillac, Pontiac, Chevrolet, Buick, Saturn, GMC, and Suzuki. During the major reorganization of General Motors under Chapter 11 in 2009, Davis was made redundant, along with many other employees. He later worked for Tata Motors and Bordrin.

== Approach and Specialization ==
Throughout his career, Davis has specialized in interior design, an area he considers more challenging than exterior design, due to the more direct interaction with users and their daily needs. His focus is on creating intuitive, comfortable, and functional experiences within the vehicle. Currently, he is sharing his expertise as an adjunct faculty/lecturer at the College for Creative Studies in Detroit.

== Gallery ==
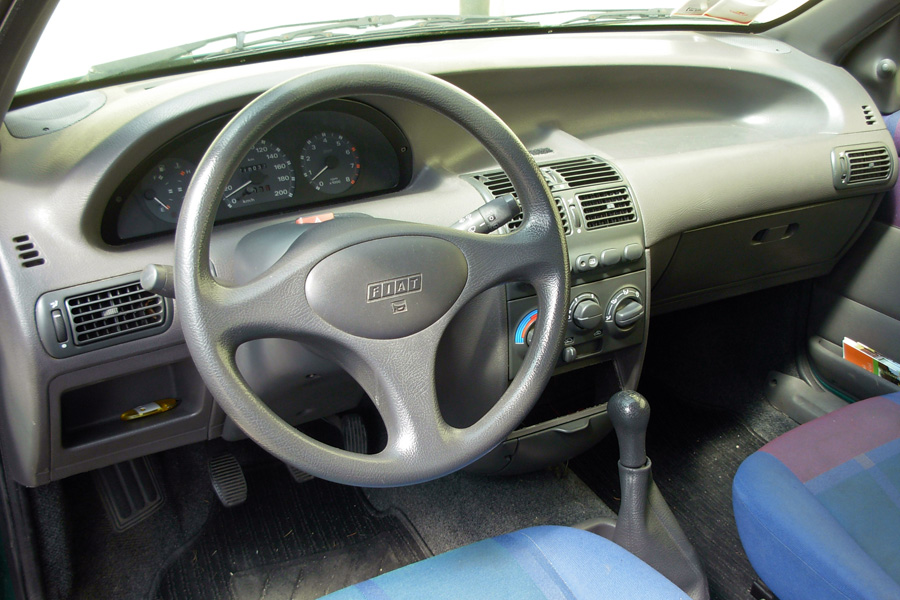
Dashboard Fiat Punto I

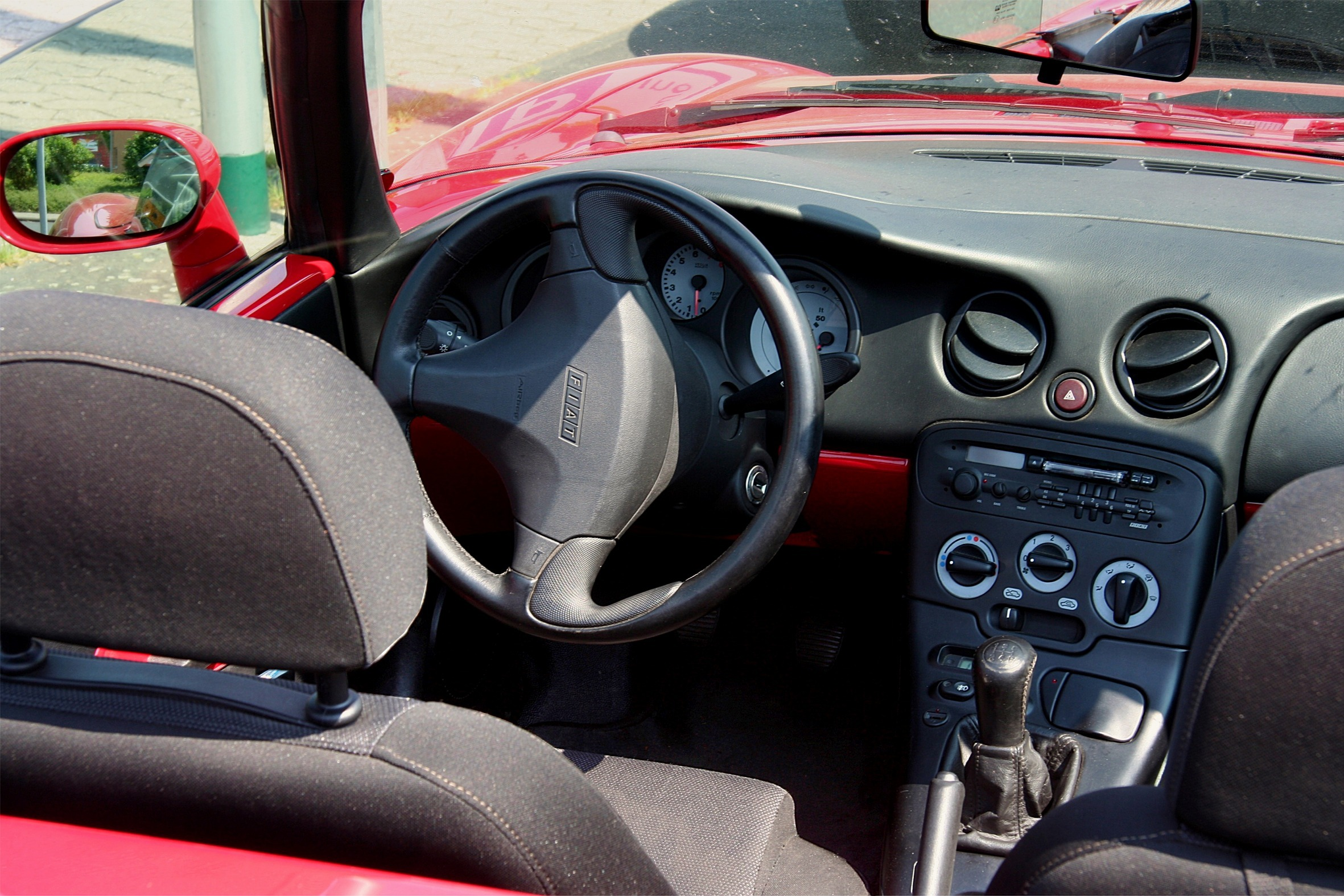
Dashboard Fiat Barchetta

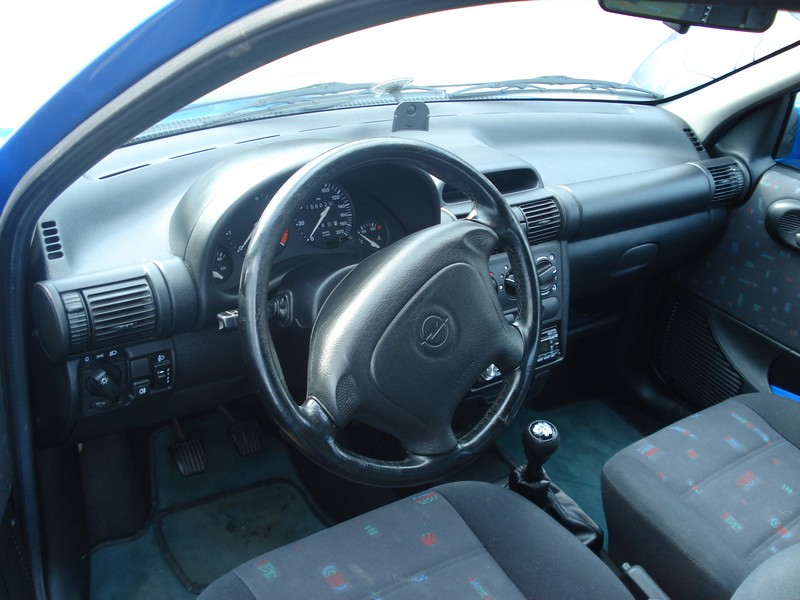
Dashboard Opel Corsa B

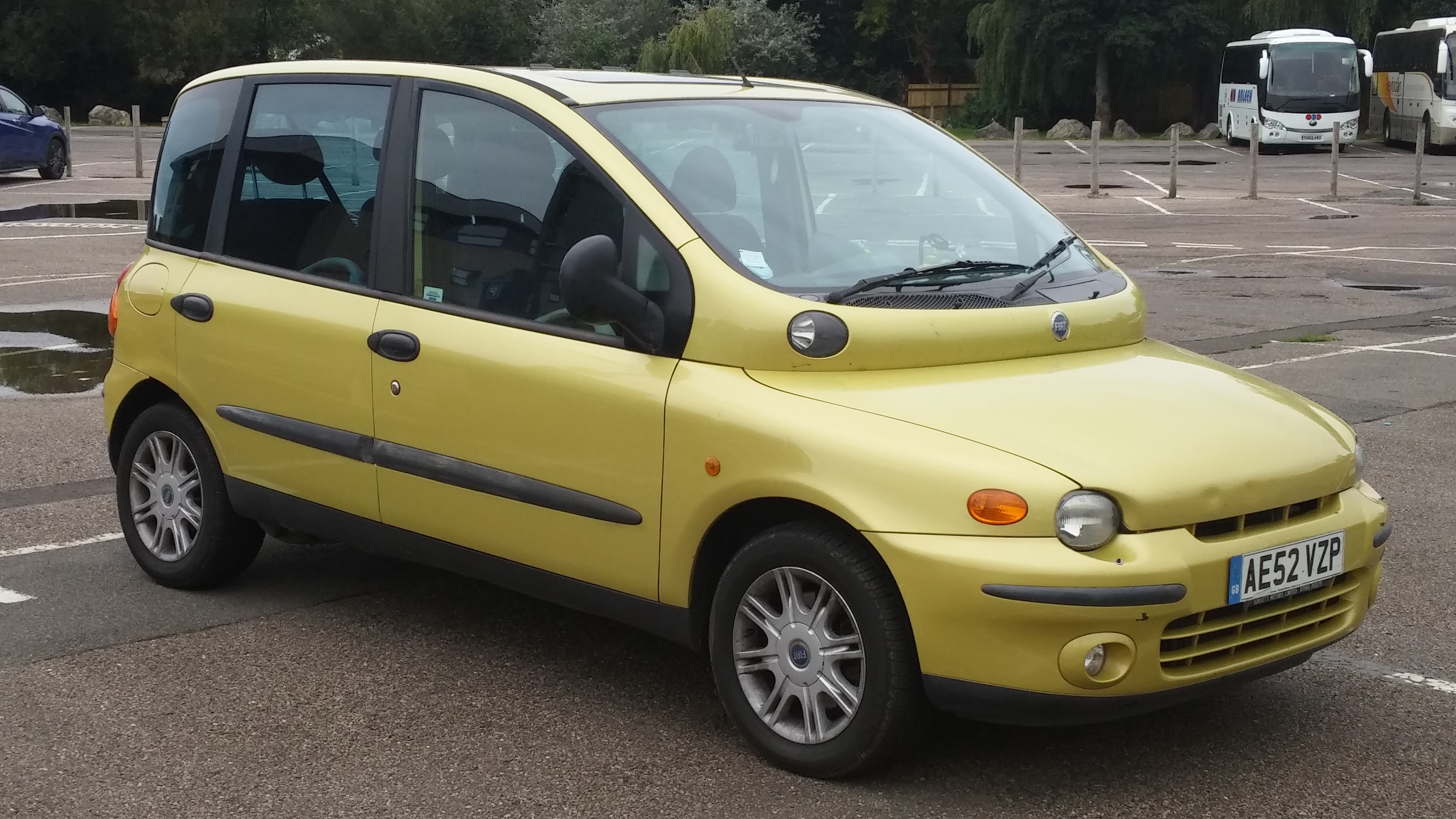
As head of Fiat Centro Stile, Davis oversaw the Multipla project
