= Matthew Hall (cricketer) =

English cricketer

Personal information
- Full name: Matthew James Hall
- Born: 30 October 1981 (age 45); Chesterfield, Derbyshire, England
- Batting: Right-handed
- Bowling: Right-arm medium

Domestic team information
- Years: Team
- 2000–2001: Derbyshire Cricket Board

Career statistics
Competition	LA
Matches	2
Runs scored	15
Batting average	7.50
100s/50s	–/–
Top score	8
Balls bowled	90
Wickets	–
Bowling average	–
5 wickets in innings	–
10 wickets in match	–
Best bowling	–
Catches/stumpings	–/–
- Source: Cricinfo, 14 October 2010

Matthew James Hall (born 30 October 1981) is a former English cricketer. Hall was a right-handed batsman who bowled right-arm medium pace. He was born at Chesterfield, Derbyshire.

Hall represented the Derbyshire Cricket Board in 2 List A matches against Derbyshire in the 2000 NatWest Trophy and Bedfordshire in 1st round of the 2002 Cheltenham & Gloucester Trophy which was held in 2001. In his 2 List A matches, he scored 15 runs at a batting average of 7.50, with a high score of 8.
