= Peter Davis (theater historian) =

American historian

Peter A. Davis is an American theatre scholar. His areas of specialization are early American theatre, Restoration theatre and Eighteenth Century cultural history. He has served on the faculty at the University of Illinois at Urbana-Champaign. On addition to teaching and writing he has also worked as a stage director, actor and dramaturg.

== Education ==
Peter Davis attended Bowdoin College, Stanford University and the University of Southern California, where he received an M.A. in Drama (Directing) in 1977. He earned his PhD in Communication-Drama, also from USC, in 1981.

== Research ==
Davis researches early American theatre, Restoration theatre and Eighteenth Century cultural history.

He is the author of From Androboros to the First Amendment: A History of America's First Play. In his review, James Holsinger noted that the book helped to "resituate the early American canon" by taking closet dramas seriously. Another book, The Stage in Crisis, on the economic history of the American stage in the Nineteenth Century was published in 2017 by Palgrave-Macmillan. He is also the author of the blog, "This Day in Theatre History".

His articles and reviews are found in established theatre journals. He contributed several articles to The Cambridge History of American Theatre (1999), winner of the Barnard Hewitt Award from the American Society for Theatre Research and the Special Jury Award of the Theatre Library Association. He was a 1988 recipient of an NEH research grant to study in effects of the Panic of 1873 on the American theatre industry.

Davis has delivered numerous academic papers at conferences and is a frequent lecturer on American theatre history.

== Faculty appointments ==
Before retiring in 2017, Professor Davis served on the faculty at the University of Illinois at Urbana-Champaign, where he was the Director of Graduate Studies and Chair of the Doctoral Program in Theatre.

Prior faculty appointments include Tufts University (1987-1991) and the University of Oregon (1981-1987).

== Production experience ==
In addition to his academic work, he is also an award-winning stage director, actor and dramaturg, having worked with a number of major theatre companies in San Francisco, Los Angeles and especially Chicago, including Remy Bumppo, Defiant, Strawdog, Writer’s Theatre, and Steppenwolf. In 2007, he acted in the original world-premiere production of August: Osage County at the Steppenwolf Theatre, performing the role of Bill on stage as Jeff Perry’s understudy. Awards include the 2006 revival of Gore Vidal’s The Best Man with Remy Bumppo (After Dark Award for Best Ensemble, Jeff Nomination for Best Ensemble) and The Philadelphia Story (2008 Jeff Nomination for Best Production), also with Remy Bumppo. He served as the resident dramaturg at Remy Bumppo Theatre Company from 2004 to 2008 and was the dramaturg for Sonia Flew at Steppenwolf in 2006 and for The Turn of the Screw at Writer’s Theatre in 2007.

=== Directing ===
As a director, he has worked on dozens of productions, winning both regional and national awards from the American College Theatre Festival. In 1985, his production of Excursion Fare was performed at the Kennedy Center in Washington D.C. as the ACTF recipient of Best Original Play. He also won the ACTF’s Best Director of the Year award from Region IX. He is a member of Actors’ Equity Association, Literary Managers and Dramaturgs Association, and The Society for Stage Directors and Choreographers.

=== Dramaturgy ===
After retirement from university teaching, he worked as the literary manager for the Remy Bumppo Theatre Company of Chicago.

== Film career ==
Davis has appeared in several films as an actor. He starred in Press Start (2007) as Count Nefarious Vile and reprised this role for the 2011 sequel Press Start 2 Continue. He also lent his voice to the popular Sim Film Freespace 2 and for Rampage (Korkusuz), where he is the voice of Ziya/Commander.

== Selected publications ==
- From Androboros to the First Amendment: A History of America's First Play (Iowa, 2015).
- "From Stock to Combination: The Panic of 1873 and Its Effects on the American Theatre Industry", in: THS 8 (1988), pp. 1–9.
- Essays in The American Stage, Engle and Miller, eds. (Cambridge), The Cambridge Guide to American Theatre, Wilmeth, ed. and Inventing Times Square, William R. Taylor, ed. (Russell Sage Foundation).
- Numerous book reviews in academic periodicals.
