= Carl Doar =

English cricketer (born 1983)

Personal information
- Full name: Carl Martin Doar
- Born: 5 July 1983 (age 43); Derby, Derbyshire, England
- Batting: Right-handed
- Bowling: Right-arm medium

Domestic team information
- Years: Team
- 2001: Derbyshire Cricket Board

Career statistics
Competition	LA
Matches	2
Runs scored	0
Batting average	0.00
100s/50s	–/–
Top score	0*
Balls bowled	60
Wickets	1
Bowling average	59.00
5 wickets in innings	–
10 wickets in match	–
Best bowling	1/44
Catches/stumpings	1/–
- Source: Cricinfo, 16 October 2010

Carl Martin Doar (born 5 July 1983) is an English former cricketer. Doar is a right-handed batsman who bowls right-arm medium pace. He was born at Derby, Derbyshire.

Doar represented the Derbyshire Cricket Board in 2 List A cricket matches. These came against Cambridgeshire in the 2001 Cheltenham & Gloucester Trophy and Bedfordshire in the 1st round of the 2002 Cheltenham & Gloucester Trophy which was held in 2002. In his 2 List A matches, he took a single wicket at a bowling average of 59.00, with best figures of 1/44.
