= John Jordison =

English cricketer

Personal information
- Full name: John Richard Jordison
- Born: 18 June 1981 (age 45); Nottingham, Nottinghamshire, England
- Batting: Right-handed
- Bowling: Right-arm medium

Domestic team information
- Years: Team
- 2001: Derbyshire Cricket Board
- 2002: Cambridge UCCE

Career statistics
Competition	First-class	List A
Matches	1	2
Runs scored	28	0
Batting average	14.00	0.00
100s/50s	0/0	0/0
Top score	17	0
Balls bowled	174	94
Wickets	1	2
Bowling average	96.00	31.50
5 wickets in innings	0	0
10 wickets in match	0	0
Best bowling	1/61	2/27
Catches/stumpings	0/–	0/–
- Source: Cricinfo, 13 October 2010

John Richard Jordison (born 18 June 1981) is an English cricketer. Jordison is a right-handed batsman who bowls right-arm medium pace. He was born at Nottingham, Nottinghamshire.

Jordison represented the Derbyshire Cricket Board in two List A matches against Wiltshire and Cambridgeshire in the 2001 Cheltenham & Gloucester Trophy. In his two List A matches, he took 2 wickets at a bowling average of 31.50, with best figures of 2/27. In 2002, he represented CUCCE in a single first-class match against Middlesex. In his only first-class match, he scored 28 runs at a batting average of 14.00, with a high score of 27. With the ball he took a single wicket at an average of 96.00, with best figures of 1/61.
