= Peter Davies (journalist) =

South African television presenter, journalist and author

Peter Davies is a South African television presenter, journalist, and author. From 1996 to 2007, he anchored hundreds of sporting events, including three Cricket World Cups and two FIFA World Cups.

On 6 October 2011, Davies appeared at the Johannesburg Magistrate's Court on a charge of lewd conduct, but charges were dropped after being settled out of court.
