= Andrew Goodwin (cricketer) =

English cricketer

Personal information
- Full name: Andrew John Goodwin
- Born: 3 September 1982 (age 44); Burton-on-Trent, Staffordshire, England
- Batting: Left-handed
- Bowling: Leg break

Domestic team information
- Years: Team
- 2001: Derbyshire Cricket Board

Career statistics
Competition	List A
Matches	2
Runs scored	38
Batting average	19.00
100s/50s	–/–
Top score	38
Balls bowled	–
Wickets	–
Bowling average	–
5 wickets in innings	–
10 wickets in match	–
Best bowling	–
Catches/stumpings	1/–
- Source: Cricinfo, 13 October 2010

Andrew John Goodwin (born 3 September 1982) is a former English cricketer. Goodwin was a left-handed opening-batsman who bowled leg break. He was born at Burton-on-Trent, Staffordshire.

Goodwin represented the Derbyshire Cricket Board in two List A matches against Wiltshire and Cambridgeshire in the 2001 Cheltenham & Gloucester Trophy. Against Wiltshire, he was dismissed for 38 by James Tomlinson, while against Cambridgeshire he was dismissed for a duck by Ajaz Akhtar. In that same season, he also appeared for the Derbyshire Cricket Board in three MCCA Knockout Trophy matches.
