= Derbyshire Cricket Board =

Governing body for cricket in Derbyshire

The Derbyshire Cricket Board is the governing body for all recreational cricket in the historic county of Derbyshire.

From 1999 to 2003 the Board fielded a team in the English domestic one-day tournament, matches which had List A status. They played seven List A matches.
