= 1999 NatWest Trophy =

- Administrator: England and Wales Cricket Board
- Cricket format: Limited overs cricket (50 overs per innings)
- Tournament format: Knockout
- Champions: Gloucestershire (2nd title)
- Participants: 60
- Matches: 59
- Most runs: 318 Tim Hancock (Gloucestershire)
- Most wickets: 15 Saqlain Mushtaq (Surrey)

The 1999 NatWest Trophy was the 19th NatWest Trophy. It was an English limited overs county cricket tournament which was held between 4 May and 29 August 1999. The tournament was won by Gloucestershire who defeated Somerset by 50 runs in the final at Lord's.

== Format ==
For the 1999 season, radical changes were made to the structure and format of the competition. Each team's innings was reduced from 60 overs per side to 50, in order to bring the county one-day game in line with the format of One Day Internationals. This in turn reduced the number of overs a bowler could bowl in an innings, down from 12 to 10.

The number of teams participating was also greatly expanded. The 18 first-class counties were joined by all twenty Minor Counties, plus Huntingdonshire. In a major change to previous tournaments, 17 amateur teams, representing the cricket boards of every first-class county except Glamorgan, were added to the competition. The Ireland, Scotland and Netherlands teams also participated, as in previous years, while Denmark made its debut in the tournament.

The tournament retained its knockout format, but now with four rounds before the quarter-final and semi-final stages. The winners of the semi-finals went on to the final at Lord's which was held on 29 August 1999.

=== First round ===
4 May 1999
(scorecard)

Huntingdonshire; 222/8 (50 overs)	v	Bedfordshire; 223/3 (45 overs)
Steven Pope 69 (96); Andrew Roberts 5/28 (10 overs)		Wayne Larkins 59 (109); Paul Swannell 1/28 (6 overs)

Bedfordshire won by 7 wickets
Wardown Park, Luton
Umpires: David Burden & John Ilott
Player of the match: Andrew Roberts (Bedfordshire)

4 May 1999
(scorecard)

Warwickshire Cricket Board; 149 all out (48 overs)	v	Berkshire; 150/4 (45.3 overs)
Jim Troughton 38; Billy Stelling 3/18 (10 overs)		Gary Loveday 56; Naheem Sajjad 2/29 (10 overs)

Berkshire won by 6 wickets
Sonning Lane, Reading
Umpires: Michael Johnson & Wyn Morgan
Player of the match: Billy Stelling (Berkshire)

4 May 1999
(scorecard)

Cumberland; 314/9 (50 overs)	v	Cornwall; 177 all out (44.2 overs)
Ashley Metcalfe 138; Chris Ellison 3/64 (10 overs)		Barry Purchase 38; Martin Lewis 3/43 (10 overs)

Cumberland won by 137 runs
Netherfield Cricket Club Ground, Kendal
Umpires: Neil Jones & Tommy Wilson
Player of the match: Ashley Metcalfe (Cumberland)

4 May 1999
(scorecard)

Oxfordshire; 224/7 (50 overs)	v	Durham Cricket Board; 226/8 (48.2 overs)
Stewart Laudat 58; Benjamin Usher 2/30 (8 overs)		Andrew Hall 78; Graham Savin 3/33 (10 overs)

Durham Cricket Board won by 2 wickets
Park Drive, Hartlepool
Umpires: Charles McNamee & Don Norton
Player of the match: Andrew Hall (Durham Cricket Board)

4 May 1999
(scorecard)

Yorkshire Cricket Board; 145 all out (40 overs)	v	Gloucestershire Cricket Board; 138 all out (49 overs)
Alan Mynett 37; Jonathan White 4/14 (10 overs)		Alastair Bressington 54; Stephen Foster 5/26 (10 overs)

Yorkshire Cricket Board won by 7 runs
Hatherley and Reddings Cricket Club Ground, Cheltenham
Umpires: Stephen Kuhlmann & Michael Moran
Player of the match: Stephen Foster (Yorkshire Cricket Board)

4 May 1999
(scorecard)

Hertfordshire; 323/7 (50 overs)	v	Leicestershire Cricket Board; 209/9 (50 overs)
Andy Griffin 121; David Brignull 2/50 (10 overs)		Ashley Wright 63; Matthew Evans 2/9 (3 overs)

Hertfordshire won by 114 runs
Brunton Memorial Ground, Radlett
Umpires: P.D. Fisher & Ross Wood
Player of the match: Andy Griffin (Hertfordshire)

4 May 1999
(scorecard)

Kent Cricket Board; 227/8 (50 overs)	v	Denmark; 169/9 (50 overs)
Matthew Featherstone 104*; Morten Hedegaard 3/42 (10 overs)		Mogens Dahl Nielsen 49*; Andy Tutt 3/16 (10 overs)

Kent Cricket Board won by 58 runs
Mote Park, Maidstone
Umpires: John Hardy & Bob Sutton
Player of the match: Matthew Featherstone (Kent Cricket Board)

4 May 1999
(scorecard)

Lincolnshire; 232/9 (50 overs)	v	Wales Minor Counties; 236/6 (47.3 overs)
Steve Plumb 52; Steve Barwick 3/44 (10 overs)		Ryan Sylvester 69; David Christmas 1/28 (8.3 overs)

Wales Minor Counties won by 4 wickets
London Road, Sleaford
Umpires: Peter Clubb & Trevor Riley
Player of the match: James Langworth (Wales Minor Counties)

4 May 1999
(scorecard)

Northamptonshire Cricket Board; 282/5 (50 overs)	v	Wiltshire; 283/8 (48.4 overs)
Jeffrey Cook 130; James Taylor 1/19 (2 overs)		Roger Sillence 82; Mark Wolstenholme 2/33 (8 overs)

Wiltshire won by 2 wickets
County Ground, Northampton
Umpires: John Reed & Bill Smith
Player of the match: Jeffrey Cook (Northamptonshire Cricket Board)

4 May 1999
(scorecard)

Northumberland; 253/8 (50 overs)	v	Ireland; 255/5 (47.5 overs)
Wayne Falla 80; Dwayne McGerrigle 5/66 (10 overs)		Neil Carson 58; Lee Crozier 2/40 (10 overs)

Ireland won by 5 wickets
Osborne Avenue, Jesmond
Umpires: Peter Brown & Jack McGurk
Player of the match: Dwayne McGerrigle (Ireland)

4 May 1999
(scorecard)

Suffolk; 284/8 (50 overs)	v	Hampshire Cricket Board; 290/3 (47.1 overs)
Glucka Wijesuriya 109*; Kirk Stewart 3/52 (10 overs)		Matthew Compton 105*; Gary Kirk 1/56 (10 overs)

Hampshire Cricket Board won by 7 wickets
Victory Ground, Bury St Edmunds
Umpires: Keith Coburn & John Tythcott
Player of the match: Matthew Compton (Hampshire Cricket Board)

4 May 1999
(scorecard)

Surrey Cricket Board; 264/8 (50 overs)	v	Norfolk; 241/6 (50 overs)
John Fry 90; Carl Rogers 2/28 (5 overs)		Carl Amos 76; Graham Crawford 2/31 (5 overs)

Surrey Cricket Board won by 23 runs
Cheam Cricket Club Ground, Cheam
Umpires: Neil Bainton & Alan Bundy
Player of the match: John Fry (Surrey Cricket Board)

4 May 1999
(scorecard)

Nottinghamshire Cricket Board; 212 all out (50 overs)	v	Scotland; 215/1 (41.4 overs)
Stephen Brogan 61; Craig Wright 4/30 (10 overs)		Stephen Crawley 109*

Scotland won by 9 wickets
Boghall Cricket Club Ground, Linlithgow
Umpires: Mick McLean & John Thallon
Player of the match: Stephen Crawley (Scotland)

4 May 1999
(scorecard)

Cambridgeshire; 215/9 (50 overs)	v	Netherlands; 219/2 (43.2 overs)
Ajaz Akhtar 46; Roland Lefebvre 3/29 (10 overs)		Kenny Jackson 88*; Nicholas Adams 1/10 (2.2 overs)

Netherlands won by 8 wickets
Sportpark Het Schootsveld, Deventer
Umpires: C.J. Pickett & Charlie Puckett
Player of the match: Roger Bradley (Netherlands)

=== Second round ===
17 May 1999
(scorecard)

Somerset Cricket Board; 200 all out (50 overs)	v	Bedfordshire; 201/6 (43.1 overs)
Kevin Parsons 65; John Hughes 3/17 (10 overs)		Richard Dalton 56; Richard Trotman 2/30 (8 overs)

Bedfordshire won by 4 wickets
County Ground, Taunton
Umpires: Guy Randall-Johnson & Gordon Ripley
Player of the match: Richard Dalton (Bedfordshire)

19 May 1999
(scorecard)

Wales Minor Counties; 250/9 (50 overs)	v	Derbyshire Cricket Board; 198 all out (49.5 overs)
Kristian Bell 39; Peter Camm 4/52 (10 overs)		David Smit 37; Mohammad Ali 3/43 (10 overs)

Wales Minor Counties won by 52 runs
Deer Park, Dunstall
Umpires: Peter Clubb & Trevor Riley
Player of the match: Alexander Barr (Wales Minor Counties)

19 May 1999
(scorecard)

Devon; 267/6 (50 overs)	v	Berkshire; 199 all out (44.3 overs)
Neil Hancock 113*; Sameer Patel 2/71 (10 overs)		Billy Stelling 76*; Neil Hancock 3/18 (7.3 overs)

Devon won by 68 runs
Recreation Ground, Torquay
Umpires: Peter Kingston-Davey & David Lea
Player of the match: Neil Hancock (Devon)

19 May 1999
(scorecard)

Staffordshire; 256/8 (50 overs)	v	Durham Cricket Board; 257/6 (48.4 overs)
Richard Harvey 66; Shaun Birbeck 2/38 (10 overs)		Shaun Birbeck 88; Peter Wellings 2/36 (10 overs)

Durham Cricket Board won by 4 wickets
Eastwood Gardens, Gateshead
Umpires: Colin Megennis & Don Norton
Player of the match: Shaun Birbeck (Durham Cricket Board)

19 May 1999
(scorecard)

Herefordshire; 211/9 (50 overs)	v	Wiltshire; 131 all out (37.5 overs)
Christopher Boroughs 50 (77); Andrew Collins 3/30 (10 overs)		Robert Wade 28 (67); Lee Caldicott 3/37 (7.5 overs)

Herefordshire won by 80 runs
The Park, Brockhampton
Umpires: Michael Johnson & Michael Moran
Player of the match: Karl Pearson (Herefordshire)

19 May 1999
(scorecard)

Sussex Cricket Board; 209/9 (50 overs)	v	Hertfordshire; 213/3 (42.2 overs)
Mark Newell 92; Steve Andrew 3/34 (10 overs)		David Ward 83*; Stuart Simmonds 2/50 (8 overs)

Hertfordshire won by 7 wickets
Balls Park, Hertford
Umpires: David Burden & Dudley Warnford
Player of the match: David Ward (Hertfordshire)

19 May 1999
(scorecard)

Kent Cricket Board; 250/3 (50 overs)	v	Worcestershire Cricket Board; 245/7 (50 overs)
Mark Alexander 107*; Kosie Venter 1/33 (10 overs)		Jonathan Wright 45; Grant Sheen 2/31 (10 overs)

Kent Cricket Board won by 5 runs
Mote Park, Maidstone
Umpires: Steve Bishopp & R. Southern
Player of the match: Mark Alexander (Kent Cricket Board)

19 May 1999
(scorecard)

Lancashire Cricket Board; 122 all out (49.2 overs)	v	Netherlands; 126/0 (31.2 overs)
David Heyes 27; Feiko Kloppenburg 3/12 (10 overs)		Roger Bradley 63*

Netherlands won by 10 wickets
Aigburth, Liverpool
Umpires: Steve Johnson & Tommy Wilson
Player of the match: Feiko Kloppenburg (Netherlands)

19 May 1999
(scorecard)

Cumberland; 207/9 (50 overs)	v	Middlesex Cricket Board; 114 all out (42.2 overs)
Steven Knox 42; Chetan Patel 2/30 (7 overs)		Mark Lowrey 24; Martin Lewis 3/10 (6.2 overs)

Cumberland won by 93 runs
John Walker's Ground, Southgate
Umpires: John Ilott & Charlie Puckett
Player of the match: Steven Knox (Cumberland)

19 May 1999
(scorecard)

Hampshire Cricket Board; 217 all out (49.4 overs)	v	Shropshire; 216 all out (50 overs)
Matthew Compton 59; Bryan Jones 3/20 (4.4 overs)		James Ralph 89; Kirk Stewart 2/25 (6 overs)

Hampshire Cricket Board won by 1 run
Orleton Park, Wellington
Umpires: Alan Bayley & Stephen Kuhlmann
Player of the match: James Ralph (Shropshire)

19 May 1999
(scorecard)

Cheshire; 171/9 (50 overs)	v	Surrey Cricket Board; 162 all out (45 overs)
Neil Cross 45; Mark Bainbridge 3/27 (6 overs)		Graham Crawford 41; Neil Cross 3/29 (9 overs)

Cheshire won by 9 runs
Wimbledon Cricket Club Ground, Wimbledon
Umpires: Neil Bainton & John Reed
Player of the match: Neil Cross (Cheshire)

19 May 1999
(scorecard)

Yorkshire Cricket Board; 91 all out (40.5 overs)	v	Buckinghamshire; 92/3 (20.4 overs)
Jeremy Batty 24*; James Bovill 2/8 (7 overs)		Mike Rindel 31; Greg Lambert 2/22 (3 overs)

Buckinghamshire won by 7 wickets
Abbeydale Park, Sheffield
Umpires: Peter Brown & David Tate
Player of the match: James Bovill (Buckinghamshire)

19 May 1999
(scorecard)

Essex Cricket Board; 196/9 (50 overs)	v	Ireland; 200/8 (47.3 overs)
Alex Richards 60; Dwayne McGerrigle 2/34 (10 overs)		Gerald Dros 51; Arif Saeed 2/36 (10 overs)

Ireland won by 2 wickets
Ormeau Cricket Ground, Belfast
Umpires: Michael Dixon & Paddy O'Hara
Player of the match: Gordon Cooke (Ireland)

19 May 1999
(scorecard)

Scotland; 245/7 (50 overs)	v	Dorset; 169 all out (47 overs)
Corey Richards 70; Peter Deakin 2/34 (5 overs)		David Miller 41; Craig Wright 3/20 (10 overs)

Scotland won by 76 runs
Hamilton Crescent, Glasgow
Umpires: Mick McLean & John Thallon
Player of the match: Craig Wright (Scotland)

=== Third round ===
23 June 1999
(scorecard)

Bedfordshire; 187/9 (50 overs)	v	Derbyshire; 190/4 (40 overs)
Neil Stanley 37; Andrew Harris 3/10 (10 overs)		Adrian Rollins 80; William Sneath 2/35 (10 overs)

Derbyshire won by 6 wickets
Wardown Park, Luton
Umpires: Mark Benson & Roy Palmer
Player of the match: Andrew Harris (Derbyshire)

23 June 1999
(scorecard)

Warwickshire; 249/7 (50 overs)	v	Buckinghamshire; 136 all out (40 overs)
David Hemp 110*; James Bovill 2/34 (10 overs)		Tim Scriven 33; Mohamed Sheikh 2/18 (7 overs)

Warwickshire won by 113 runs
Pound Lane, Marlow
Umpires: John Hampshire & Neil Mallender
Player of the match: David Hemp (Warwickshire)

23 June 1999
(scorecard)

Kent; 312/7 (50 overs)	v	Cheshire; 204/9 (40 overs)
Nigel Llong 123; Christopher Finegan 3/34 (10 overs)		Neil Cross 57; Dean Headley 3/16 (7 overs)

Kent won by 108 runs
South Downs Road, Bowdon, Greater Manchester
Umpires: Vanburn Holder & John Steele
Player of the match: Matthew Fleming (Kent)

23 June 1999
(scorecard)

Cumberland; 214/8 (50 overs)	v	Sussex; 216/4 (31.4 overs)
Terry Hunte 82; Robin Martin-Jenkins 2/24 (10 overs)		Michael Di Venuto 72; Marcus Sharp 2/30 (10 overs)

Sussex won by 6 wickets
Netherfield Cricket Club Ground, Kendal
Umpires: Tony Clarkson & Nigel Cowley
Player of the match: Terry Hunte (Cumberland)

23 June 1999
(scorecard)

Worcestershire; 256/8 (50 overs)	v	Devon; 211/8 (40 overs)
Reuben Spiring 57; Peter Roebuck 2/32 (10 overs)		Andrew Pugh 54; Gavin Haynes 2/31 (10 overs)

Worcestershire won by 45 runs
The Maer Ground, Exmouth
Umpires: Jeff Evans & Barrie Leadbeater
Player of the match: Andrew Pugh (Devon)

23 June 1999
(scorecard)

Gloucestershire; 271/8 (50 overs)	v	Durham Cricket Board; 109 all out (34 overs)
Tim Hancock 59; Gareth Smith 2/35 (8 overs)		Benjamin Usher 32; Ian Harvey 4/29 (10 overs)

Gloucestershire won by 162 runs
Riverside Ground, Chester-le-Street
Umpires: Peter Clubb & Trevor Riley
Player of the match: Ian Harvey (Gloucestershire)

23 June 1999
(scorecard)

Glamorgan; 245/8 (50 overs)	v	Hampshire Cricket Board; 177 all out (47 overs)
Steve James 87; Charles van der Gucht 3/35 (10 overs)		Chris Nevin 56; Darren Thomas 3/35 (10 overs)

Glamorgan won by 68 runs
County Ground, Southampton
Umpires: John Harris & Alan Whitehead
Player of the match: Charles van der Gucht (Hampshire Cricket Board)

23 June 1999
(scorecard)

Yorkshire; 275/8 (50 overs)	v	Herefordshire; 124/5 (40 overs)
Anthony McGrath 70 (60); Christopher Boroughs 2/41 (7 overs)		Robert Hughes 39 (119); Gavin Hamilton 2/22 (7 overs)

Yorkshire won by 151 runs
The Recreation Ground, Kington
Umpires: Barry Dudleston & Peter Willey
Player of the match: Anthony McGrath (Yorkshire)

23 June 1999
(scorecard)

Lancashire; 381/3 (50 overs)	v	Hertfordshire; 213/6 (50 overs)
Mike Watkinson 130; Stephen Burrow 2/69 (10 overs)		Andy Griffin 42*; Mike Watkinson 2/44 (10 overs)

Lancashire won by 168 runs
Brunton Memorial Ground, Radlett
Umpires: Nigel Plews & Martin Reed
Player of the match: Mike Watkinson (Lancashire)

23 June 1999
(scorecard)

Hampshire; 262/7 (50 overs)	v	Kent Cricket Board; 132 all out (41 overs)
Robin Smith 68 (60); Damon Trigger 3/53 (10 overs)		James Golding 47 (67); Shaun Udal 3/32 (9 overs)

Hampshire won by 130 runs
St Lawrence Ground, Canterbury
Umpires: Allan Jones & Mervyn Kitchen
Player of the match: James Golding (Kent Cricket Board)

23 June 1999
(scorecard)

Essex; 281/6 (50 overs)	v	Northamptonshire; 282/5 (48 overs)
Ronnie Irani 88 (91); Kevin Innes 2/54 (10 overs)		Matthew Hayden 107 (119); Ashley Cowan 2/46 (10 overs)

Northamptonshire won by 5 wickets
County Ground, Northampton
Umpires: John Holder & David Shepherd
Player of the match: Matthew Hayden (Northamptonshire)

23 June 1999
(scorecard)

Nottinghamshire; 229/8 (50 overs)	v	Middlesex; 150 all out (43 overs)
Paul Johnson 50; Paul Weekes 3/43 (10 overs)		Mark Ramprakash 49; Paul Franks 3/7 (8 overs)

Nottinghamshire won by 79 runs
Trent Bridge, Nottingham
Umpires: Ray Julian & George Sharp
Player of the match: Paul Franks (Nottinghamshire)

23 June 1999
(scorecard)

Somerset; 267/5 (50 overs)	v	Wales Minor Counties; 129 all out (39.2 overs)
Mike Burns 52*; Steve Barwick 1/35 (10 overs)		James Langworth 28; Keith Parsons 3/14 (5.2 overs)

Somerset won by 138 runs
St. Helen's, Swansea
Umpires: Paul Adams & Ken Palmer
Player of the match: Andy Caddick (Somerset)

23 June 1999
(scorecard)

Durham; 194 all out (50 overs)	v	Netherlands; 195/5 (45 overs)
Martin Speight 60; Feiko Kloppenburg 4/25 (10 overs)		Feiko Kloppenburg 61; Simon Brown 1/31 (10 overs)

Netherlands won by 5 wickets
VRA Cricket Ground, Amstelveen
Umpires: Graham Burgess & Willem Molenaar
Player of the match: Feiko Kloppenburg (Netherlands)

23 June 1999
(scorecard)

Leicestershire; 287 all out (49.5 overs)	v	Ireland; 151 all out (48.4 overs)
Darren Maddy 89; Ryan Eagleson 4/59 (10 overs)		Ed Joyce 39*; Aftab Habib 2/5 (0.4 overs)

Leicestershire won by 136 runs
Castle Avenue, Dublin
Umpires: Louis Hogan & Bob White
Player of the match: Darren Maddy (Leicestershire)

23 June 1999
(scorecard)

Scotland; 147 all out (48 overs)	v	Surrey; 148/3 (37.3 overs)
Drew Parsons 33 (82); Saqlain Mushtaq 4/17 (9 overs)		Alec Stewart 64 (82); Craig Wright 1/21 (10 overs)

Surrey won by 7 wickets
The Grange, Edinburgh
Umpires: Chris Balderstone & William Smith
Player of the match: Saqlain Mushtaq (Surrey)

=== Fourth round ===
7 July 1999
(scorecard)

Glamorgan; 254/5 (50 overs)	v	Warwickshire; 238 all out (49.4 overs)
Steve James 118*; Ashley Giles 2/52 (10 overs)		David Hemp 55; Robert Croft 3/38 (10 overs)

Glamorgan won by 16 runs
Sophia Gardens, Cardiff
Umpires: Ken Palmer & David Shepherd
Player of the match: Steve James (Glamorgan)

7 July 1999
(scorecard)

Derbyshire; 112 all out (41.4 overs)	v	Gloucestershire; 116/2 (32.1 overs)
Ben Spendlove 23; Mark Alleyne 4/14 (9.4 overs)		Tim Hancock 54; Kevin Dean 1/17 (7 overs)

Gloucestershire won by 8 wickets
The Royal & Sun Alliance County Ground, Bristol
Umpires: Graham Burgess & Ray Julian
Player of the match: Mark Alleyne (Gloucestershire)

7 July 1999
(scorecard)

Hampshire; 239/8 (50 overs)	v	Lancashire; 243/9 (49.3 overs)
Jason Laney 95 (124); Michael Smethurst 4/46 (10 overs)		Andrew Flintoff 44 (45); Nixon McLean 3/27 (9.3 overs)

Lancashire won by 1 wicket
County Ground, Southampton
Umpires: Neil Mallender & Alan Whitehead
Player of the match: Michael Smethurst (Lancashire)

7 July 1999
(scorecard)

Northamptonshire; 281/6 (50 overs)	v	Nottinghamshire; 177 all out (40.5 overs)
Alec Swann 74; Vasbert Drakes 3/47 (10 overs)		Paul Johnson 51; Kevin Curran 4/29 (10 overs)

Northamptonshire won by 104 runs
County Ground, Northampton
Umpires: Vanburn Holder & Mervyn Kitchen
Player of the match: Kevin Curran (Northamptonshire)

7 July 1999
(scorecard)

Sussex; 192/8 (50 overs)	v	Somerset; 195/5 (46.2 overs)
Rajesh Rao 67; Steffan Jones 4/25 (9 overs)		Piran Holloway 79; James Kirtley 2/47 (10 overs)

Somerset won by 5 wickets
County Ground, Hove
Umpires: John Harris & Jeremy Lloyds
Player of the match: Piran Holloway (Somerset)

7 July 1999
(scorecard)

Worcestershire; 204/9 (50 overs)	v	Surrey; 206/5 (46.5 overs)
Graeme Hick 66 (90); Saqlain Mushtaq 3/30 (10 overs)		Graham Thorpe 91 (148); Alamgir Sheriyar 2/52 (8.5 overs)

Surrey won by 5 wickets
New Road, Worcester
Umpires: Trevor Jesty & John Steele
Player of the match: Graham Thorpe (Surrey)

7 July 1999
(scorecard)

Leicestershire; 229/9 (50 overs)	v	Yorkshire; 233/6 (48.3 overs)
Vince Wells 84; Gavin Hamilton 3/37 (10 overs)		Michael Vaughan 85; Alan Mullally 4/23 (10 overs)

Yorkshire won by 4 wickets
Headingley, Leeds
Umpires: Chris Balderstone & David Constant
Player of the match: Michael Vaughan (Yorkshire)

7 July 1999
(scorecard)

Kent; 229 all out (48.5 overs)	v	Netherlands; 167 all out (47.5 overs)
Rob Key 67; Roland Lefebvre 5/26 (9.5 overs)		Klaas-Jan van Noortwijk 29; Matthew Fleming 3/34 (10 overs)

Kent won by 62 runs
VRA Cricket Ground, Amstelveen
Umpires: Barry Dudleston & John Holder
Player of the match: Roland Lefebvre (Netherlands)

=== Quarter-finals ===
28 July 1999
(scorecard)

Gloucestershire; 274/6 (50 overs)	v	Glamorgan; 138 all out (41.1 overs)
Tim Hancock 91; Robert Croft 4/47 (10 overs)		Adrian Dale 38; Mike Smith 2/19 (10 overs)

Gloucestershire won by 136 runs
Sophia Gardens, Cardiff
Umpires: Tony Clarkson & Pasty Harris
Player of the match: Tim Hancock (Gloucestershire)

28 July 1999
(scorecard)

Yorkshire; 263/7 (50 overs)	v	Lancashire; 208 all out (45.4 overs)
David Byas 72 (100); Glen Chapple 3/41 (10 overs)		Mike Atherton 61 (97); Greg Blewett 4/18 (5.4 overs)

Yorkshire won by 55 runs
Old Trafford, Manchester
Umpires: Allan Jones & Peter Willey
Player of the match: Craig White (Yorkshire)

28 July 1999
(scorecard)

Northamptonshire; 152 all out (35.5 overs)	v	Surrey; 156/3 (35.3 overs)
Graeme Swann 42; Saqlain Mushtaq 4/28 (10 overs)		Graham Thorpe 42*; Graeme Swann 2/40 (9 overs)

Surrey won by 7 wickets
County Ground, Northampton
Umpires: Jeremy Lloyds & Alan Whitehead
Player of the match: Saqlain Mushtaq (Surrey)

28 July 1999
(scorecard)

Kent; 264/5 (50 overs)	v	Somerset; 266/4 (46.2 overs)
Matthew Walker 73; Andy Caddick 2/28 (10 overs)		Piran Holloway 75*; Mark Ealham 2/45 (9 overs)

Somerset won by 6 wickets
County Ground, Taunton
Umpires: George Sharp & Bob White
Player of the match: Jamie Cox (Somerset)

=== Semi-finals ===
14 August 1999
(scorecard)

Somerset; 315/8 (50 overs)	v	Surrey; 195 all out (43.3 overs)
Jamie Cox 114 (113); Saqlain Mushtaq 4/32 (10 overs)		Graham Thorpe 62 (61); Keith Parsons 4/43 (10 overs)

Somerset won by 120 runs
County Ground, Taunton
Umpires: John Holder & Barrie Leadbeater
Player of the match: Jamie Cox (Somerset)

14 August 1999
(scorecard)

Gloucestershire; 240/7 (50 overs)	v	Yorkshire; 234/6 (50 overs)
Kim Barnett 98 (145); Paul Hutchison 2/38 (8 overs)		David Byas 71* (97); Mark Alleyne 2/45 (10 overs)

Gloucestershire won by 6 runs
The Royal & Sun Alliance County Ground, Bristol
Umpires: David Constant & Roy Palmer
Player of the match: Kim Barnett (Gloucestershire)

=== Final ===
29 August 1999
(scorecard)

Gloucestershire; 230/8 (50 overs)	v	Somerset; 180 all out (45.1 overs)
Tim Hancock 74 (119); Paul Jarvis 5/55 (10 overs)		Robert Turner 51 (71); Ian Harvey 3/23 (7.1 overs)

Gloucestershire won by 50 runs
Lord's, London
Umpires: Nigel Plews & David Shepherd
Player of the match: Jack Russell (Gloucestershire)
