= List of Herefordshire County Cricket Club List A players =

Herefordshire County Cricket Club, in its current form, was formed in 1992, and first competed in the Minor Counties Championship in their founding season. They have appeared in fourteen List A matches, making six NatWest Trophy and eight Cheltenham & Gloucester Trophy appearances. The players in this list have all played at least one List A match. Herefordshire cricketers who have not represented the county in List A cricket are excluded from the list.

Players are listed in order of appearance, where players made their debut in the same match, they are ordered by batting order. Players in bold have played first-class cricket.

== Key ==
**General**

- ♠ – Captain
- † – Wicket-keeper
- **First** – Year of debut for Herefordshire
- **Last** – Year of latest match played for Herefordshire
- **Mat** – Number of matches played for Herefordshire
- **Win%** – Winning percentage

**Batting**

- **Inn** – Number of innings batted
- **NO** – Number of innings not out
- **Runs** – Runs scored in career
- **HS** – Highest score
- **100** – Centuries scored
- **50** – Half-centuries scored
- **Avg** – Runs scored per dismissal
- * – Batsman remained not out

**Bowling**

- **Balls** – Balls bowled in career
- **Wkt** – Wickets taken in career
- **BBI** – Best bowling in an innings
- **BBM** – Best bowling in a match
- **Ave** – Average runs per wicket

**Fielding**

- **Ca** – Catches taken
- **St** – Stumpings effected

== List of players ==
No.	Name	Nationality	First	Last	Mat	Batting			Bowling				Fielding	
No.	Name	Nationality	First	Last	Mat	Runs	HS	Avg	Balls	Wkt	BBI	Ave	Ca	St
1	**Harshad Patel** ♠	England	1995	2003	12	196	68	16.33	0	0	–	–	1	0
2	**Martin Weston**	England	1995	1995	1	9	9	9.00	72	0	–	–	0	0
3	Stephen Brogan	England	1995	1995	1	10	10	10.00	0	0	–	–	0	0
4	Jonathan Wright	England	1995	1995	1	20	20	20.00	0	0	–	–	4	0
5	Matthew Robinson	Wales	1995	1995	1	15	15	15.00	48	0	–	–	0	0
6	Richard Skyrme ♠	England	1995	1997	2	17	10	8.50	72	2	2/78	39.00	3	0
7	**Stuart Bevins** †	England	1995	1997	2	34	26	17.00	0	0	–	–	0	0
8	**Michael Bailey**	England	1995	1995	1	0	0	0.00	42	0	–	–	0	0
9	Mitchell Fowles	England	1995	1997	2	2	2*	2.00	132	3	2/73	48.66	1	0
10	Richard Harding	England	1995	1998	3	29	17	14.50	156	0	–	–	1	0
11	**Kevin Jarvis**	England	1995	1995	1	4	4	4.00	66	2	2/45	22.50	2	0
12	Robert Hall †	England	1997	1998	2	82	53	41.00	0	0	–	–	2	0
13	Richard Barlow	England	1997	1997	1	15	15	15.00	0	0	–	–	0	0
14	Ian Blakemore	England	1997	1997	1	7	7	7.00	12	0	–	–	0	0
15	David Graham	England	1997	1999	4	28	14	7.00	0	0	–	–	1	0
16	**Neal Radford**	England	1997	1998	2	42	25*	42.00	114	3	2/64	29.33	1	0
17	**Kevin Cooper** ♠	England	1997	2002	8	23	12*	11.50	472	3	1/18	106.33	3	0
18	Jamie Sylvester	Wales	1998	2000	2	59	53	29.50	24	0	–	–	1	0
19	Christopher Boroughs ♠	England	1998	2004	12	322	72	32.20	216	4	2/41	38.75	4	0
20	Stephen Price	England	1998	1999	3	37	19*	18.50	–	0	–	–	0	0
21	**Mark Briers**	England	1998	1998	1	0	0	0.00	0	0	–	–	0	0
22	Paul Humphries	England	1998	2001	5	6	5*	–	270	6	2/25	30.83	0	0
23	Robert Hughes	England	1999	2004	7	78	39	13.00	0	0	–	–	1	0
24	**Stephen Adshead** †	England	1999	1999	2	41	22	20.50	0	0	–	–	2	2
25	Karl Pearson	England	1999	2002	8	115	35	23.00	150	4	2/18	30.25	0	0
26	Lee Caldicott	England	1999	1999	1	35	35*	–	47	3	3/37	12.33	0	0
27	**Andrew Tweedie**	South Africa	1999	1999	2	0	0	0.00	90	3	2/27	27.00	0	0
28	**Paul Thomas**	England	1999	2002	5	14	7	4.66	270	5	50.40	2/50	1	0
29	**Ismail Dawood** †	England	2000	2004	9	294	60	32.66	0	0	–	–	13	2
30	Ross Lupton	Australia	2000	2000	1	24	24	24.00	48	2	2/33	16.50	0	0
31	Aamir Farooque	England	2000	2002	6	47	21*	11.75	240	4	1/16	42.50	4	0
32	Neeraj Prabhu	England	2000	2001	2	24	24	24.00	0	0	–	–	0	0
33	Nathan Round	England	2000	2001	5	160	66	40.00	60	2	2/28	26.50	1	0
34	Andrew Edwards	England	2001	2001	3	55	34*	27.50	72	2	2/34	26.00	0	0
35	**Andre Adams**	New Zealand	2001	2001	2	55	46	27.50	120	4	2/29	24.50	2	0
36	Jonathan Shaw	England	2001	2001	1	0	0	–	54	3	3/49	16.33	0	0
37	Nicholas Davies	England	2001	2004	8	77	39*	15.40	349	8	4/72	31.12	4	0
38	Ravi Nagra	England	2001	2001	3	154	105	51.33	54	0	–	–	1	0
39	**Lincoln Roberts**	Trinidad and Tobago	2001	2001	1	10	10	10.00	36	2	2/36	18.00	0	0
40	Andrew Mason	England	2001	2001	1	1	1	1.00	0	0	–	–	1	0
41	Paul Lazenbury	England	2002	2002	2	71	71	35.50	42	3	3/49	16.33	0	0
42	**Glenn Roberts**	England	2002	2002	1	12	12	12.00	60	1	1/35	35.00	1	0
43	**Rana Naved-ul-Hasan**	Pakistan	2002	2002	1	25	25	25.00	53	4	4/49	12.25	1	0
44	**Martin McCague**	England	2002	2004	3	29	18*	29.00	126	4	2/58	43.25	2	0
45	Simon Roberts	England	2002	2004	3	5	3	2.50	138	5	3/36	18.40	0	0
46	**Aaron Barnes**	New Zealand	2003	2003	1	19	19	19.00	30	0	–	–	0	0
47	**Matthew Rawnsley**	England	2003	2004	2	61	61	61.00	100	3	3/8	17.33	0	0
48	**Franklyn Rose**	Jamaica	2003	2004	2	17	15	8.50	102	7	5/19	10.85	0	0
49	Mark Horrocks	England	2003	2004	2	3	3*	–	66	1	1/46	78.00	0	0
50	Richard Hall	England	2004	2004	1	54	54*	–	0	0	–	–	1	0
51	Duncan Willetts	England	2004	2004	1	0	0	–	0	0	–	–	0	0

== List A captains ==
No.	Name	First	Last	Mat	Won	Lost	Tied	Win%
1	Richard Skyrme	1995	1997	2	0	2	0	0%
2	Kevin Cooper	1998	1998	1	0	1	0	0%
3	Harshad Patel	1999	2000	3	1	2	0	33.33%
4	Christopher Boroughs	2001	2004	8	4	4	0	50%
**Total**		1995	2004	**14**	**5**	**9**	**0**	**35.00%**
