= Atif Butt (cricketer) =

Pakistani-born former Danish cricketer

Personal information
- Born: 28 November 1969 (age 56); Pakistan

International information
- National side: Denmark

Domestic team information
- Years: Team
- 1998: Denmark

Career statistics
Competition	List A
Matches	1
Runs scored	35
Batting average	35.00
100s/50s	0/0
Top score	35
Catches/stumpings	0/–
- Source: Cricinfo, 15 January 2011

Atif Butt (born 28 November 1969) is a Pakistani-born former Danish cricketer, who played mainly as a batsman.

Butt made his debut for Denmark against the Netherlands in 1989. In that same year, he played two friendly matches against the touring Australians, who had just finished their successful Ashes series against England. He played in his first ICC Trophy in its fourth edition in the Netherlands, making three appearances against East and Central Africa, the United States and the Netherlands. He next appeared for Denmark in the 1994 ICC Trophy in Kenya, making eight appearances during the tournament, the last of which came against Namibia. Butt was Denmark's leading run-scorer during the tournament, with 305 runs at an average of 43.57, with a high score of 71. One of three half centuries he made in the tournament, his best score came against Malaysia. He toured Namibia in 1998, making four appearances on the tour. In 1999, he played in Denmark's first appearance in List A cricket against the Kent Cricket Board in English domestic crickets NatWest Trophy. In what was Butt's only List A appearance, the Kent Cricket Board made 227/8 from their 50 overs, with Denmark making 169/9 in their fifty overs to lose the match by 58 runs. Butt scored 35 runs in that innings, before he was dismissed by Grant Sheen. He made his final appearance for Denmark in the 2000 European Championship against the Netherlands.
