= Skyrme =

Skyrme is a surname. Notable people with the surname include:

- James Skyrme (died 1722), Welsh pirate
- Richard Skyrme (born 1960), English cricketer
- Thomas Skyrme (1913–2002), British civil servant, army officer, and magistrate
- Tony Skyrme (1922–1987), British physicist
