= Andrew Griffin =

Andrew Griffin may refer to:

- Andrew Griffin (politician), Welsh politician
- Andy Griffin (born 1979), English footballer
- Andy Griffin (cricketer) (born 1972), English cricketer
- Drew Griffin (1962–2022), American journalist
