= Chetan Patel =

English cricketer

Personal information
- Full name: Chetan Morar Patel
- Born: 12 April 1972 (age 54); Islington, London, England
- Batting: Left-handed
- Bowling: Right-arm medium

Domestic team information
- Years: Team
- 1997: Oxford University
- 1997: Hampshire
- 1999: Middlesex Cricket Board

Career statistics
Competition	First-class	List A
Matches	12	2
Runs scored	420	2
Batting average	24.70	2.00
100s/50s	–/3	–/–
Top score	63*	2
Balls bowled	1,962	66
Wickets	27	2
Bowling average	49.11	27.50
5 wickets in innings	1	–
10 wickets in match	–	–
Best bowling	6/110	2/30
Catches/stumpings	2/–	1/–
- Source: Cricinfo, 10 January 2010

Chetan Morar Patel (born 12 April 1972) is a former English first-class cricketer.

Patel was born at Islington in April 1972. Having initially studied at Loughborough University, Patel later studied at Keble College, Oxford. While studying at Oxford, he made his debut in first-class cricket for Oxford University Cricket Club against Durham at Oxford in 1997. He made eleven appearances for Oxford in that season, including in The University Match against Cambridge University at Lord's. He became the first Oxford bowler to take a hat-trick in first-class cricket in thirty years, a feat he achieved against Warwickshire. With his right-arm medium pace bowling, he took 27 wickets at an average of 46.70; he took one five wicket haul, with figures of 6 for 110 in The University Match.

Following an injury crisis at Hampshire during the 1997 season, which saw Cardigan Connor, Kevan James, Dimitri Mascarenhas, and Stuart Milburn sidelined, Patel made a single first-class appearance against Yorkshire at Portsmouth in the County Championship, debuting alongside Lee Savident. He also made a single appearance in List A one-day cricket for Hampshire, against Middlesex at Lord's in the 1997 Axa Life League. He later made a single one-day appearance for the Middlesex Cricket Board (MCB) against Cumberland in the 1999 NatWest Trophy, having also played for the MCB in the MCCA Knockout Trophy. Outside of cricket, Patel joined Hays in 1997, becoming its managing director for their London City region.
