= Andy Collins =

Andy Collins may refer to:

- Andy Collins (TV presenter) (born 1970), British television personality
- Andy Collins (game designer), role-playing game developer and "Sage" for Wizards of the Coast
- Andy Collins (artist) (born 1971), American artist

== See also ==
- Andrew Collins (disambiguation)
