= Stefan Jenkins =

Welsh cricketer

Personal information
- Full name: Stefan Hefin Gravell Jenkins
- Born: 17 April 1974 (age 52); Carmarthen, Carmarthenshire, Wales
- Batting: Right-handed
- Bowling: Right-arm medium Right-arm off break

Domestic team information
- Years: Team
- 1996–1999: Wales Minor Counties

Career statistics
Competition	List A
Matches	3
Runs scored	73
Batting average	24.33
100s/50s	–/–
Top score	44
Balls bowled	–
Wickets	–
Bowling average	–
5 wickets in innings	–
10 wickets in match	–
Best bowling	–
Catches/stumpings	3/–
- Source: Cricinfo, 13 May 2011

Stefan Hefin Gravell Jenkins (born 17 April 1974) is a former Welsh cricketer. Jenkins was a right-handed batsman who bowled both right-arm medium pace and right-arm off break. He was born in Carmarthen, Carmarthenshire.

Jenkins made his debut for Wales Minor Counties in the 1996 Minor Counties Championship against Berkshire. He played Minor counties cricket for Wales Minor Counties from 1996 to 1999, which included 7 Minor Counties Championship matches and 4 MCCA Knockout Trophy matches. In 1998, he made his List A debut against Nottinghamshire, in the NatWest Trophy. He played 2 further List A matches for the team, against Lincolnshire and the Derbyshire Cricket Board in 1999 NatWest Trophy. In his 3 List A matches, he scored 73 runs at a batting average of 24.33, with a high score of 44.
