= Neil Cross (cricketer) =

English cricketer

Personal information
- Full name: Neil David Cross
- Born: 19 September 1972 (age 54); Wallasey, Cheshire, England
- Batting: Right-handed
- Bowling: Right-arm off break

Domestic team information
- Years: Team
- 1995–2005: Cheshire

Career statistics
Competition	List A
Matches	8
Runs scored	159
Batting average	31.80
100s/50s	–/1
Top score	57
Balls bowled	258
Wickets	6
Bowling average	29.16
5 wickets in innings	0
10 wickets in match	0
Best bowling	3/29
Catches/stumpings	1/–
- Source: Cricinfo, 13 October 2018

Neil David Cross (born 19 September 1972) is a former English minor counties cricketer.

Cross was born at Wallasey in Cheshire. He made his debut in minor counties cricket for Cheshire in 1995 against Wales Minor Counties at Pontarddulais in the Minor Counties Championship. He made his debut in the Minor Counties Trophy in that same season. Prior to 2006, Cheshire were permitted to take part alongside the eighteen first-class counties in county crickets domestic one-day competition, with the matches carrying List A status. Cross made his debut in List A cricket when Cheshire played Essex in the 1998 NatWest Trophy at Chester. He would go on to make eight appearances in List A cricket for Cheshire, with his final appearance coming in the 2004 Cheltenham & Gloucester Trophy (although played in August 2003) against Bedfordshire. Across his eight matches, he scored 159 runs at an average of 31.80. His highest score of 57 came against first-class opposition in the form of Kent in the 1999 NatWest Trophy. With his off break bowling, Cross took 6 wickets with best figures of 3/29. He continued to play minor counties cricket for Cheshire until 2005, making a total of 55 appearances in the Minor Counties Championship and 27 appearances in the Minor Counties Trophy. He now works as an assistant-headteacher at Chester Catholic High School.
