= James Bovill =

English cricketer (born 1971)

Personal information
- Full name: James Noel Bruce Bovill
- Born: 2 June 1971 (age 55); High Wycombe, Buckinghamshire, England
- Batting: Right-handed
- Bowling: Right-arm fast-medium

Domestic team information
- Years: Team
- 1990–1993: Buckinghamshire
- 1993–1997: Hampshire
- 1998–1999: Buckinghamshire

Career statistics
| Competition | First-class | List A |
|---|---|---|
| Matches | 38 | 26 |
| Runs scored | 324 | 34 |
| Batting average | 9.81 | 5.66 |
| 100s/50s | –/– | –/– |
| Top score | 31 | 14* |
| Balls bowled | 5,717 | 1,134 |
| Wickets | 104 | 27 |
| Bowling average | 32.53 | 33.81 |
| 5 wickets in innings | 4 | – |
| 10 wickets in match | 1 | – |
| Best bowling | 6/29 | 4/44 |
| Catches/stumpings | 7/– | 3/– |
- Source: Cricinfo, 8 December 2009

James Noel Bruce Bovill (born 2 June 1971) is an English former cricketer who played first-class cricket predominantly for Hampshire from 1993 to 1997.

Bovill was born at High Wycombe in June 1971. He was educated at Charterhouse School, before matriculating to Durham University. Playing his early club cricketer for Marlow, Bovill played minor counties cricket for Buckinghamshire in the Minor Counties Championship between 1990 and 1993. While studying at Durham, he was chosen to represent the Combined Universities cricket team in 1992 Benson & Hedges Cup, making his debut in List A one-day cricket against Worcestershire. He made four appearances for the Combined Services in that seasons competition. Bovill was signed by Hampshire while still a student at Durham, making two one-day appearances for Hampshire in the 1993 Axa Equity & Law League, in addition to making his debut in first-class cricket against Essex in the County Championship at Chelmsford. In 1994, he made his final two appearances for the Combined Universities. The first at Oxford came against Lancashire in the preliminary round of the Benson & Hedges Cup. The second at Fenner's was a first-class match against the touring New Zealanders, in which Bovill notably took the first three New Zealander wickets to reduce the tourists to 62 for 3.

During the 1994 season, he made five first-class appearances for Hampshire, alongside four one-day appearances Axa Equity & Law League. He took his maiden first-class five wicket haul during the season, with 5 for 108 against Leicestershire in the County Championship. In 1995, he took 30 first-class wickets at an average of 27.13; against Durham, he took his career best figures of 6 for 29, having also taken 6 for 39 in the Durham first innings, for match figures of 12 for 68. His returns improved the following season, with 34 first-class wickets, though at a higher average of 35.26. Prior to the 1997 season, Bovill helped to coach the Argentina national cricket team head of their participation in the 1997 ICC Trophy, alongside Hampshire teammate William Kendall. During the 1997 season, he made nine first-class and four one-day appearances in the Axa Life League, but dropped out of the team following an injury midway through the season. Bovill retired from professional cricket after the 1997 season, having suffered from a persistent back injury. In 37 first-class matches for Hampshire, he took 99 wickets at an average of 33.11; he took four five wicket hauls, with his 12 wickets against Durham in 1995 the only time he took ten-wickets in a match.

In 1998, he played at minor counties level, returning to his home county Buckinghamshire. Bovill played minor counties cricket for Buckinghamshire in 1998 and 2000, making nine appearances in the Minor Counties Championship and ten appearances in the MCCA Knockout Trophy. Alongside his minor counties appearances, Bovill also made three List A one-day appearances for Buckinghamshire: one in the 1998 NatWest Trophy against Surrey, and two in the 1999 NatWest Trophy against the Yorkshire Cricket Board and Warwickshire.
