= Mark Lowrey =

Mark Lowrey may refer to:

- Mark Perrin Lowrey (1828–1885), Southern Baptist preacher
- Mark Lowrey (cricketer) (born 1971), former English cricketer
