= Birbeck =

Birbeck is a surname. Notable people with the surname include:

- Michael Stanley Clive Birbeck (1925–2005), discoverer of Birbeck granules
- Birbeck granules, organelles in Langerhans cells
- Joe Birbeck (1932–2016), English footballer
- Shaun Birbeck (born 1972), English cricketer
