= Smethurst =

Smethurst is a surname. Notable people with the surname include:

- Adam Smethurst, English actor and writer
- Allan Smethurst (1927–2000), a.k.a. The Singing Postman, English folk singer and postman
- Annika Smethurst (born 1987), Australian journalist.
- Becky Smethurst, British astrophysicist, author, and YouTuber
- Daniel Smethurst (born 1990), English tennis player
- Derek Smethurst (born 1947), retired South African soccer forward
- Gamaliel Smethurst (1738–1826), American-born author and politician in Nova Scotia
- George William Smethurst, British naive artist born in 1902 (requires Wiki page to be set up)
- Jack Smethurst (1932–2022), English TV and film comic actor
- Justine Smethurst (born 1987), Australian softball player
- Michael Smethurst (born 1976), English cricketer
- Richard Smethurst (born 1941), Provost of Worcester College, Oxford, England
- Thomas Smethurst, convicted murderer in 1859 of his wife, Isabella Bankes

== See also ==
- Mount Smethurst, prominent mountain in Enderby Land
- Simone Thust
