= Martin Lewis =

Martin Lewis or Martyn Lewis may refer to:

- Martin Lewis (artist) (1881–1962), Australian artist and printmaker
- Martin Lewis (Australian actor) (born 1970)
- Martin Lewis (basketball) (born 1975), American basketball player
- Martin Lewis (cricketer) (born 1969), English cricketer
- Martin Lewis (English actor) (1888–1970), actor in The Heirloom Mystery
- Martin Lewis (financial journalist) (born 1972), English journalist, television presenter, author
- Martin Lewis (humorist) (born 1952), US-based writer, radio/TV host, humorist, producer, marketing strategist
- Martin W. Lewis (born 1956), American historical geographer, author, and academic
- Martyn Lewis, Welsh broadcast journalist
- Martyn Lewis (badminton), Welsh badminton player

== See also ==
- Martin and Lewis, American comedy team (1946–1956)
  - Martin and Lewis (film), a 2002 TV film about the comedy team
- The Martin Lewis Money Show, British documentary show that airs on ITV
