= Matthew Evans =

Matthew or Matt Evans may refer to:

- Mathew Evans (fl. 1874), Canadian inventor
- Matthew Evans, Baron Evans of Temple Guiting (1941–2016), British Labour Party politician
- Matthew Evans (cricketer) (born 1974), former English cricketer
- Matthew Rhys (born 1974), stage name used by Welsh actor born Matthew Evans
- Matt Evans (actor) (born 1988), Filipino actor
- Matt Evans (rugby union) (born 1988), Canadian rugby union player
- Matt Evans (footballer) (born 2006), Guatemalan footballer
- Matthew Evans, front man of the band Murry the Hump
