= Richard Harding =

Richard Harding may refer to:

- Richard Harding (forger), (1770–1805) convicted of forgery and uttering
- Richard Harding (rugby union), (born 1953) former Rugby Union player for England
- Richard Harding (cricketer), (born 1966) former English cricketer
- Richard Harding (curler), (born c. 1956) Scottish curler
- Richard C. Harding, Judge Advocate General of the United States Air Force
- Richard Harding Davis (1864–1916), American journalist and writer
- Richard Harding, pseudonym of American writer Robert Tine (1954–2019), author of "The Outrider" series.

== See also ==
It may also refer to:

- Richard Newman (English cricketer) (1756/57–1808), English landowner and cricketer who was born Richard Harding
