= Andrew Collins =

Andrew Collins may refer to:

- Andrew Collins (actor) (born 1973), British actor
- Andrew Collins (broadcaster) (born 1965), British journalist, scriptwriter, and broadcaster
- Andrew Collins (cricketer) (1972–1999), British cricketer
- Andrew Collins (footballer, born 1965), former Australian rules footballer for Hawthorn
- Andrew Collins (footballer, born 1988), former Australian rules footballer for Carlton
- Andrew Collins (judge) (born 1942), English barrister and judge
- Andrew Collins (politician) (born 1983), American politician in Arkansas

== See also ==
- Andy Collins (disambiguation)
