= Hatherley and Reddings Cricket Club Ground =

Cricket ground in Cheltenham, England

Coordinates: 51°52′21″N 02°06′17″W

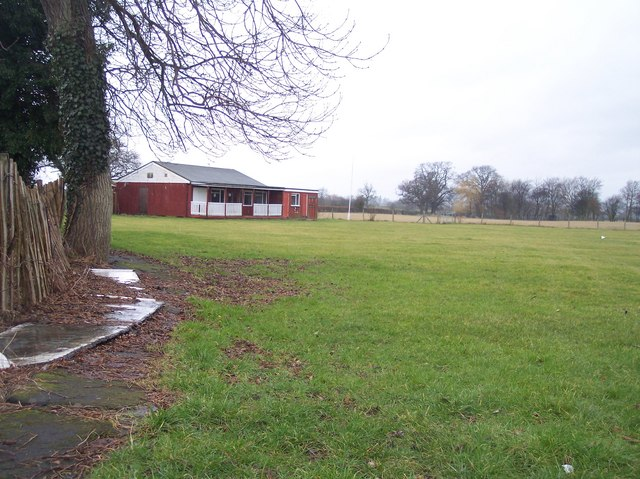
- Interactive map of Hatherley and Reddings Cricket Club Ground

Ground information
- Location: Cheltenham, Gloucestershire
- Country: England
- Establishment: 1986 (first recorded match)

Team information
Gloucestershire Cricket Board	(1999)
- As of 9 November 2011; Source: Ground profile

Hatherley and Reddings Cricket Club Ground is a cricket ground in Cheltenham, Gloucestershire. The first recorded match held on the ground came in 1986 when Hatherley and Reddings Cricket Club played the Netherlands. The ground later held a single List A match when the Gloucestershire Cricket Board played the Yorkshire Cricket Board in the 1999 NatWest Trophy, with the Yorkshire Cricket Board winning by 7 runs.

Hatherley and Reddings Cricket Club still use the ground to this day.
