= Graham Crawford =

English cricketer

Personal information
- Full name: Graham Andrew Crawford
- Born: 16 October 1967 (age 59); Windlesham, Surrey, England
- Nickname: Shirley
- Batting: Right-handed
- Bowling: Right-arm off break
- Role: Senior Coach, Flinders Park Cricket Club, South Australia
- Relatives: Spouse Rebecca Crawford

Domestic team information
- Years: Team
- 1999: Surrey Cricket Board

Career statistics
Competition	LA
Matches	2
Runs scored	71
Batting average	35.50
100s/50s	–/–
Top score	41
Balls bowled	30
Wickets	2
Bowling average	15.50
5 wickets in innings	–
10 wickets in match	–
Best bowling	2/31
Catches/stumpings	–/–
- Source: Cricinfo, 31 October 2010

Graham Andrew Crawford (born 16 October 1967) is a former English cricketer. Crawford was a right-handed batsman who bowled right-arm off break. He was born in Windlesham, Surrey.

Crawford represented the Surrey Cricket Board in 2 List A cricket matches against Norfolk and Cheshire in the 1999 NatWest Trophy. In his 2 List A matches, he scored 71 runs at a batting average of 35.50, with a high score of 41. With the ball he took 2 wickets at a bowling average of 15.50, with best figures of 2/31.
