= Higsons Brewery =

Brewery in Liverpool, England

Higsons was a brewery in Liverpool, England, founded in 1780 and closed by Whitbread in 1990. Higsons beer was brewed in Sheffield and Durham after closure before being discontinued. The brand has been revived in the 21st century.

== The beginning ==
Higsons Brewery was formed in 1780 at 64 Dale Street, Liverpool. The company brewed beer at this site until 1914, when it moved to the Windsor Brewery in Upper Parliament Street.

== Expansion through the 1920s ==
In 1918, the brewery was bought by J. Sykes & Company. The combined company began to expand further, acquiring several public houses on the Wirral and the Spraggs Brewery in 1919. In 1923, the company bought the newly merged Walker Cains' Brewery in Liverpool's Stanhope Street following that company's decision to focus production at its Warrington brewery. There was one last push for expansion in 1927, when the firm acquired Joseph Jones & Co. in Knotty Ash. A further 70 public houses were added as a result.

== The later years ==
In 1962, Higsons purchased a new head office in North Street, Liverpool. 1974 saw the brewery merge with James Mellor & Sons. In 1978, Higsons acquired Bent's Brewery, which was based next to its North Street head office. The vendor was the Bass Brewery. Boddingtons of Manchester acquired Higsons in 1985 but decided to abandon brewing in 1989 to focus on its pubs. Boddingtons' brewing arm was sold to Whitbread in 1990 which subsequently closed the Higsons Stanhope brewery.

== Revival of the Higsons brand ==
In 2005, the former Mayflower Brewery in Wigan, originally run by a former Higsons brewing chemist, was commissioned to recreate the original Higsons Bitter in a series of test brews. The beer was subsequently produced in Liverpool before production ended.

The beer was later produced by the Liverpool Organic Brewery in 2011 before the licence to produce the brand ended.

== 2017 H1780 Tap & Still opens and Higsons relaunched ==
In December 2015, the Liverpool Echo reported that a company called Higsons Brewery Limited had applied for planning permission to convert two vacant warehouses in Liverpool into a brewery with a distillery, visitor centre, shop and sampling hall. Higsons Brewery Ltd is owned by the former managing director of the Caledonian Brewery, Stephen Crawley. As well as his 25 years' experience in the brewing industry, Stephen grew up on the Wirral and his wife controls the company which owns the Higsons brand. In August 2017, it was reported that work on the new premises had begun. In December 2017, H1780 opened. It comprises a brewery brewing Higsons and Love Lane beers, gin distillery, three bars and a kitchen. The H in the name is for Higsons and 1780 is the year that Higsons was founded. Four Higsons beers are now produced: Bitter Ale, Pale Ale, Amber Ale and Pilsner
