= Charles van der Gucht =

English cricketer

Personal information
- Full name: Charles Graham van der Gucht
- Born: 14 January 1980 (age 46); Hammersmith, London, England
- Batting: Left-handed
- Bowling: Slow left-arm orthodox
- Relatives: Paul van der Gucht (grandfather)

Domestic team information
- Years: Team
- 1999: Hampshire Cricket Board
- 2000: Hampshire (squad no. 16)
- 2001: Durham UCCE

Career statistics
Competition	First-class	List A
Matches	2	3
Runs scored	38	4
Batting average	38.00	2.00
100s/50s	–/–	–/–
Top score	38	3
Balls bowled	204	144
Wickets	4	5
Bowling average	34.50	19.00
5 wickets in innings	–	–
10 wickets in match	–	–
Best bowling	3/75	3/35
Catches/stumpings	–/–	–/–
- Source: Cricinfo, 24 August 2009

Charles Graham van der Gucht (born 14 January 1980) is a former English cricketer.

The grandson of the cricketer Paul van der Gucht, he was born at Hammersmith in January 1980. He was educated at Radley College, before matriculating to the College of St Hild and St Bede at Durham University. van der Gucht played for the Hampshire Cricket Board (HCB) in the 1999 ECB 38-County Cup and later in the season, he made his debut in List A one-day cricket for the HCB against Suffolk at Bury St Edmunds in the NatWest Trophy first round. He played two further one-day matches in that competition, in the second and third rounds against Shropshire and Glamorgan respectively.

Having been a member of Hampshire's under-19 Championship winning team in 1998, he made a single appearance in first-class cricket for Hampshire against the touring Zimbabweans at Southampton in 2000. He took figures of 3 for 75 with his slow left-arm orthodox bowling in the Zimbabweans first innings, notably dismissing Murray Goodwin. He made an additional first-class appearance while studying at Durham, playing for Durham UCCE against Lancashire in June 2001. In July 2001, van der Gucht was involved in a serious accident when he was run over by a taxi on Twickenham Bridge in London, breaking both of his legs. His recovery required him to undertake intensive physiotherapy that winter, but it would take thirteen months for him to return to playing. After recovering from the accident, he captained the Hampshire Second XI, but did not feature again for the first team. As a result, van der Gucht left Hampshire at the end of the 2003 season to pursue a career away from cricket. He ended his brief cricket career with four first-class and five one-day wickets.
