= Terry Hunte =

West Indian cricketer

Personal information
- Full name: Terence Anderson Hunte
- Born: 4 April 1962 (age 64); Saint Philip, Barbados
- Batting: Right-handed
- Bowling: Right-arm medium

Domestic team information
- Years: Team
- 1983/84–1987/88: Barbados
- 1992–2001: Cumberland

Career statistics
Competition	First-class	List A
Matches	14	8
Runs scored	585	354
Batting average	23.40	50.57
100s/50s	–/5	1/2
Top score	72	114
Balls bowled	88	25
Wickets	–	–
Bowling average	–	–
5 wickets in innings	–	–
10 wickets in match	–	–
Best bowling	–	–
Catches/stumpings	9/–	1/–
- Source: Cricinfo, 1 April 2011

Terence Anderson Hunte (born 4 April 1962) is a former Barbadian cricketer. Hunte was a right-handed batsman who bowled right-arm medium pace. He was born in Saint Philip, Barbados.

== Barbados ==
Hunte made his first-class debut for Barbados in 1984 against Jamaica. He played first-class cricket for Barbados on 13 occasions, playing his final match against Jamaica in February 1988. In his 13 first-class matches for his home island, he scored 516 runs at a batting average of 21.50, with four half centuries and a high score of 72. It was also for Barbados that Hunte made his debut in List A cricket, which came against Guyana in 1985. He a further three List A matches for Barbados to 1986. In his four matches in that format for Barbados, he scored 257 runs at a batting average of 64.25, a single century high score of 114, to go with two half centuries he made. His highest List A score came on debut against Guyana.

While playing for Barbados, Hunte also played a single first-class match for the West Indies Under-23s against the touring New Zealanders in March 1985. In this match he batted once, scoring 69 runs before being dismissed by John Bracewell.

== Move to England ==
Hunte made his debut for Cumberland in a List A fixture in the 1992 NatWest Trophy against Essex. He didn't appear for Cumberland again until 1999, when he made his Minor Counties Championship debut against Lincolnshire. Hunte played Minor counties cricket for Cumberland from 1999 to 2001, including eight Minor Counties Championship matches and nine MCCA Knockout Trophy matches. Starting from 1999, he played three further List A matches for Cumberland, the last of which came against Kent in the 2001 Cheltenham & Gloucester Trophy. In his four List A matches for Cumberland, he scored 97 runs at a batting average of 32.33, with a high score of 82. His only half century for Cumberland came against Sussex in the 1999 NatWest Trophy.
