= Dwayne McGerrigle =

Irish cricketer

Personal information
- Full name: Robert Dwayne McGerrigle
- Born: 12 March 1980 (age 46); Derry, Northern Ireland
- Batting: Right-handed
- Bowling: Right-arm medium

International information
- National side: Ireland

Domestic team information
- Years: Team
- 1999: Ireland

Career statistics
Competition	First-class	List A
Matches	1	3
Runs scored	0	11
Batting average	0.00	11.00
100s/50s	–/–	–/–
Top score	0	9*
Balls bowled	150	180
Wickets	5	7
Bowling average	14.00	22.71
5 wickets in innings	–	1
10 wickets in match	–	–
Best bowling	4/24	5/66
Catches/stumpings	–/–	1/–
- Source: Cricinfo, 23 October 2011

Robert Dwayne McGerrigle (born 12 March 1980) is a former Irish cricketer. McGerrigle is a right-handed batsman who bowls right-arm medium pace. He was born at Derry, Northern Ireland.

McGerrigle made twelve Youth One Day International appearances for Ireland Under-19s, appearing in the 1998 Under-19 World Cup and the 2000 Under-19 World Cup. He made a single first-class appearance for Ireland against Scotland at Ormeau, Belfast in 1999. He took 4 wickets for 24 runs in Scotland's first-innings, while in their second-innings he took the wicket of Drew Parsons. He batted once in the match and was dismissed for a duck by Asim Butt. He made his List A debut for Ireland against Northumberland in the 1999 NatWest Trophy, taking 5/66 in an Irish victory. He played two further List A matches, both in the 1999 NatWest Trophy against the Essex Cricket Board and Leicestershire. He took a total of 7 wickets in his three matches, which came at an average of 22.71.

He still plays club cricket in Northern Ireland for Donemana Cricket Club.
