= Stewart Laudat =

English cricketer (born 1971)

Personal information
- Full name: Stewart Vernon Laudat
- Born: 25 February 1971 (age 55); Oxford, Oxfordshire, England
- Batting: Right-handed
- Bowling: Right-arm medium

Domestic team information
- Years: Team
- 1996–1997: Minor Counties
- 1990–2006: Oxfordshire

Career statistics
Competition	List A
Matches	17
Runs scored	324
Batting average	23.14
100s/50s	–/2
Top score	58
Balls bowled	740
Wickets	11
Bowling average	58.54
5 wickets in innings	–
10 wickets in match	–
Best bowling	2/15
Catches/stumpings	3/–
- Source: Cricinfo, 20 May 2011

Stewart Vernon Laudat (born 25 February 1971) is an English cricketer. Laudat is a right-handed batsman who bowls right-arm medium pace. He was born in Oxford, Oxfordshire.

Laudat made his debut for Oxfordshire in the 1990 Minor Counties Championship against Wiltshire. Laudat played Minor counties cricket for Oxfordshire from 1990 to 2006, which included 48 Minor Counties Championship matches and 28 MCCA Knockout Trophy matches. He made his List A debut against Surrey in the 1991 NatWest Trophy. He played 8 further List A matches for Oxfordshire, the last coming against Huntingdonshire in the 2001 Cheltenham & Gloucester Trophy. In his 8 List A matches for Oxfordshire, he scored 229 runs at a batting average of 28.62, with a high score of 58. His highest score came against the Durham Cricket Board in the 1999 NatWest Trophy. With the ball he took 6 wickets at a bowling average of 56.00, with best figures of 2/15.

Playing for Oxfordshire entitled him to also play for the Minor Counties cricket team. He made his debut for the team in the 1996 Benson & Hedges Cup against Leicestershire. He played 6 further List A matches for the team, the last coming against Yorkshire in the 1997 Benson & Hedges Cup. In his 7 matches for the team, he scored 95 runs at an average of 15.83, with a high score of 43*. With the ball the took 5 wickets at an average of 61.60, with best figures of 2/40. Overall, Laudat played 17 List A matches in his career. In these he scored a total of 324 runs at an average of 23.14, with 2 half centuries and a high score of 58. With the ball, he took 11 wickets at an average of 58.54, with best figures of 2/15.

He has previously played for the Northamptonshire Second XI in 1992.
