= Richard Dalton (cricketer) =

English cricketer

Personal information
- Full name: Richard Neil Dalton
- Born: 11 August 1965 (age 61); Portsmouth, Hampshire, England
- Batting: Right-handed
- Bowling: Right-arm medium

Domestic team information
- Years: Team
- 1997–1998: Minor Counties
- 1991–2001: Bedfordshire

Career statistics
Competition	List A
Matches	11
Runs scored	249
Batting average	22.63
100s/50s	0/3
Top score	76
Balls bowled	400
Wickets	12
Bowling average	31.58
5 wickets in innings	0
10 wickets in match	0
Best bowling	3/28
Catches/stumpings	2/–
- Source: Cricinfo, 29 May 2011

Richard Neil Dalton (born 11 August 1965) is a former English cricketer. Dalton was a right-handed batsman who bowled right-arm medium. He was born in Portsmouth, Hampshire.

Dalton made his debut for Bedfordshire in the 1991 Minor Counties Championship against Suffolk. He played Minor counties cricket for Bedfordshire from 1991 to 2001, which included 59 Minor Counties Championship matches and 26 MCCA Knockout Trophy matches. He made his List A debut for Bedfordshire against Warwickshire in the 1994 NatWest Trophy. He played 3 further List A matches for Bedfordshire, the last coming against the Somerset Cricket Board in the 1999 NatWest Trophy. As an all-rounder, Dalton scored 76 runs at a batting average of 19.00, with a high score of 56. With the ball, he took 6 wickets at a bowling average of 20.66, with best figures of 2/32.

Playing for Bedfordshire allowed Dalton to play for the combined Minor Counties cricket team. He made his debut for the team in the 1997 Benson & Hedges Cup against Derbyshire. Dalton played 6 further List A matches for the team, the last coming against Nottinghamshire in the 1998 Benson & Hedges Cup. In his 7 matches for the team, he scored 173 runs at an average of 24.71, with a high score of 76. While with the ball, he took 6 wickets at an average of 42.50, with best figures of 3/28. Overall, Dalton played 11 List A matches, scoring 249 runs at an average of 22.63, and taking 12 wickets at an average of 31.58.
