= Mark Alexander (cricketer) =

English cricketer

Personal information
- Full name: Mark Steven Alexander
- Born: 5 April 1962 (age 64); Farnborough, Kent, England
- Height: 5 ft 10 in (1.78 m)
- Batting: Left-handed
- Bowling: Right-arm off break
- Role: Wicketkeeper

Domestic team information
- Years: Team
- 1999–2001: Kent Cricket Board

Career statistics
Competition	List A
Matches	9
Runs scored	182
Batting average	26.00
100s/50s	1/0
Top score	107*
Catches/stumpings	4/1
- Source: Cricinfo, 24 October 2010

Mark Steven Alexander (born 5 April 1962) is an English first-class cricketer. Alexander is a left-handed batsman who bowls right-arm off break and who formerly played primarily as a wicketkeeper. He was born at Farnborough, Kent.

Alexander represented the Kent Cricket Board in List A cricket. His debut List A game came against Denmark in the 1999 NatWest Trophy. From 1999 to 2001, he represented the Board in 9 List A matches, the last of which came against the Leicestershire Cricket Board in the 2nd round of the 2002 Cheltenham & Gloucester Trophy which was held in 2001. In his 9 List A matches, he scored 182 runs at a batting average of 26.00, with a single century high score of 107*. Behind the stumps he took 4 catches and made a single stumping.

He played club cricket for Tunbridge Wells Cricket Club in the Kent Cricket League.
