= Gary Kirk =

English cricketer (born 1961)

Personal information
- Full name: Gary Michael Kirk
- Born: 10 April 1961 (age 65); Colchester, Essex, England
- Batting: Right-handed
- Bowling: Right-arm fast-medium

Domestic team information
- Years: Team
- 1998–2002: Suffolk

Career statistics
Competition	List A
Matches	9
Runs scored	4
Batting average	4.00
100s/50s	–/–
Top score	3*
Balls bowled	528
Wickets	14
Bowling average	21.42
5 wickets in innings	–
10 wickets in match	–
Best bowling	3/16
Catches/stumpings	–/–
- Source: Cricinfo, 5 July 2011

Gary Michael Kirk (born 10 April 1961) is a former English cricketer. Kirk was a right-handed batsman who bowled and right-arm fast-medium. He was born in Colchester, Essex.

Kirk made his debut for Suffolk in the 1998 MCCA Knockout Trophy against Norfolk. Kirk played Minor counties cricket for Suffolk from 1998 to 2002, which included 23 Minor Counties Championship appearances and 17 MCCA Knockout Trophy matches. He made his List A debut against the Hampshire Cricket Board in the 1999 NatWest Trophy. He made 8 further List A appearances, the last of which came against Buckinghamshire in the 1st round of the 2003 Cheltenham & Gloucester Trophy, which was held in 2002. In his 9 List A matches, he took 14 wickets at a bowling average of 21.42, with best figures of 3/16.
