= Damon Trigger =

New Zealand-born English cricketer

Personal information
- Full name: Damon James Trigger
- Born: 22 April 1972 (age 54); Lower Hutt, Wellington, New Zealand
- Batting: Right-handed
- Bowling: Right-arm medium-fast

Domestic team information
- Years: Team
- 1999–2003: Kent Cricket Board

Career statistics
Competition	LA
Matches	10
Runs scored	56
Batting average	11.20
100s/50s	–/–
Top score	18*
Balls bowled	528
Wickets	14
Bowling average	27.64
5 wickets in innings	–
10 wickets in match	–
Best bowling	3/53
Catches/stumpings	1/–
- Source: Cricinfo, 13 November 2010

Damon James Trigger (born 22 April 1972) is a New Zealand-born former English cricketer. Trigger was a right-handed batsman who bowled right-arm medium-fast. He was born at Lower Hutt, Wellington.

Trigger represented the Kent Cricket Board in List A cricket. His debut List A match came against Denmark in the 1999 NatWest Trophy. From 1999 to 2003, he represented the Board in 10 List A matches, the last of which came against Derbyshire in the 2003 Cheltenham & Gloucester Trophy. In his 10 List A matches, he scored 56 runs at a batting average of 11.20, with a high score of 18*. In the field he took a single catch. With the ball he took 14 wickets at a bowling average of 27.64, with best figures of 3/53.
