= Sameer Patel =

English cricketer

Personal information
- Full name: Sameer Satesh Patel
- Born: 16 June 1976 (age 50); Reading, Berkshire, England
- Batting: Right-handed
- Bowling: Right-arm off break

Domestic team information
- Years: Team
- 1996–2006: Berkshire

Career statistics
Competition	LA
Matches	11
Runs scored	104
Batting average	14.85
100s/50s	–/1
Top score	53*
Balls bowled	345
Wickets	7
Bowling average	36.71
5 wickets in innings	–
10 wickets in match	–
Best bowling	2/28
Catches/stumpings	7/–
- Source: Cricinfo, 8 August 2010

Sameer Satesh Patel (born 16 June 1976) is a former English cricketer. Patel was a right-handed batsman who bowled right-arm off break. He was born at Reading, Berkshire.

Patel made his debut for Berkshire in the 1996 Minor Counties Championship against Cornwall. From 1996 to 2004, he represented the county in 27 Minor Counties Championships matches, with his final appearance for the county in that competition coming against Herefordshire. He also represented Berkshire in 23 MCCA Knockout Trophy matches, the last of which came against Dorset in 2006.

Patel also represented the county in List-A matches, making his List-A debut against the Warwickshire Cricket Board in the 1999 NatWest Trophy. From 1999 to 2005, he represented the county in 6 List-A matches, with his final match in that format coming against Gloucestershire in the 2005 Cheltenham & Gloucester Trophy. In his 6 List-A matches, he scored 104 runs at a batting average of 14.85, with a single half century high score of 53*. With the ball he took 7 wickets at a bowling average of 36.71, with best figures of 2/28.
