= Simon Dutton (cricketer) =

English cricketer

Personal information
- Full name: Simon Michael Dutton
- Born: 7 March 1964 (age 62); Barrow-in-Furness, Lancashire, England
- Batting: Right-handed
- Role: Wicket-keeper

Domestic team information
- Years: Team
- 1984–2001: Cumberland

Career statistics
Competition	List A
Matches	15
Runs scored	309
Batting average	30.90
100s/50s	–/2
Top score	68*
Balls bowled	–
Wickets	–
Bowling average	–
5 wickets in innings	–
10 wickets in match	–
Best bowling	–
Catches/stumpings	21/1
- Source: Cricinfo, 1 April 2011

Simon Michael Dutton (born 17 March 1964) is a former English cricketer. Dutton was a right-handed batsman who fielded as a wicket-keeper. He was born in Barrow-in-Furness, Lancashire.

Dutton made his debut for Cumberland in the 1984 Minor Counties Championship against Hertfordshire. Dutton played Minor counties cricket for Cumberland from 1984 to 2001, including 119 Minor Counties Championship matches and 34 MCCA Knockout Trophy matches. He was involved in both of Cumberland's Minor Counties Championship winning sides, playing in 1986 and captaining the team in 1999.

In 1987, he made his List A debut against Sussex in the NatWest Trophy. He played 14 further List A matches for Cumberland, the last of which came against Kent in the 2001 Cheltenham & Gloucester Trophy. In his 15 List A matches, he scored 309 runs at a batting average of 30.90, with a high score of 68*. Behind the stumps he took 21 catches and made 4 stumpings. His highest List A score, one of two half centuries he made in his List A career, came against Derbyshire in the 1998 NatWest Trophy. He also played Second XI cricket for the Hampshire Second XI and the Glamorgan Second XI.

As well as playing cricket, Dutton worked as a teacher at Chetwynde School, where he was head of sport.
