= Paul van der Gucht =

English cricketer (1911–1993)

Personal information
- Full name: Paul Ian van der Gucht
- Born: 2 November 1911; Worksop, Nottinghamshire, England
- Died: 15 December 1993 (aged 82); Basingstoke, Hampshire, England
- Batting: Right-handed
- Role: Wicket-keeper
- Relatives: Charles van der Gucht (grandson)

Domestic team information
- Years: Team
- 1932–1933: Gloucestershire
- 1935–1936: Europeans
- 1937–1947: Bengal

Career statistics
Competition	First-class
Matches	51
Runs scored	1587
Batting average	23.00
100s/50s	1/7
Top score	115
Balls bowled	6
Wickets	0
Bowling average	–
5 wickets in innings	–
10 wickets in match	–
Best bowling	–
Catches/stumpings	74/25
- Source: Cricinfo, 4 August 2013

Paul van der Gucht (2 November 1911 – 15 December 1993) was an English cricketer. He played for Gloucestershire between 1932 and 1933, and later had a long first-class career in India, representing the Europeans in the Bombay Quadrangular from 1935 to 1936 and Bengal in the Ranji Trophy from 1937 to 1947.
