= Robert Wade (cricketer) =

English cricketer (born 1968)

Personal information
- Full name: Robert Harold Wade
- Born: 12 December 1968 (age 57); Epsom, Surrey, England
- Nickname: Wadey, Ginny, Stan
- Height: 6 ft 4 in (1.93 m)
- Batting: Right-handed
- Bowling: Right-arm medium
- Role: All Rounder

Domestic team information
- Years: Team
- 1995–2002: Wiltshire

Career statistics
Competition	LA
Matches	4
Runs scored	70
Batting average	17.50
100s/50s	–/–
Top score	28
Balls bowled	78
Wickets	1
Bowling average	77.00
5 wickets in innings	–
10 wickets in match	–
Best bowling	1/53
Catches/stumpings	2/–
- Source: Cricinfo, 10 October 2010

Robert Harold Wade (born 12 December 1968) is an English cricketer. Wade is a right-handed batsman who bowls right-arm medium pace. He was born at Epsom, Surrey.

== Career ==
Wade made his Minor Counties Championship debut for Wiltshire in 1995 against Shropshire. From 1995 to 1999, he represented the county in 31 Minor Counties matches, the last of which came against Herefordshire. Wade also represented Wiltshire in the MCCA Knockout Trophy, making his debut in that competition against Hertfordshire in 1996. From 1996 to 1999, he represented the county in 19 Trophy matches.

Wade also represented Wiltshire in List A matches. His debut List A match came against the Northamptonshire Cricket Board in the 1999 NatWest Trophy. From 1999 to 2002, he represented the county in four List A matches, the last of which came against the Hampshire Cricket Board in the 1st round of the 2002 Cheltenham & Gloucester Trophy. In those four matches he scored 70 runs at a batting average of 17.50, with a high score of 28, and took two catches. With the ball he took a single wicket at a bowling average of 77.00, with best figures of 1/53.

Wade played for South Wilts Cricket Club in the Southern Premier League, captaining them their 2004 championship season.
