= Lee Crozier =

English cricketer (born 1973)

Personal information
- Full name: Lee James Crozier
- Born: 16 October 1973 (age 53); Newcastle upon Tyne, Northumberland, England
- Batting: Right-handed
- Bowling: Right-arm off break

Domestic team information
- Years: Team
- 1996–2006: Northumberland

Career statistics
Competition	List A
Matches	8
Runs scored	14
Batting average	4.66
100s/50s	–/–
Top score	8*
Balls bowled	438
Wickets	12
Bowling average	30.75
5 wickets in innings	–
10 wickets in match	–
Best bowling	3/30
Catches/stumpings	2/–
- Source: Cricinfo, 1 August 2011

Lee James Crozier (born 16 October 1973) is an English cricketer. Crozier is a right-handed batsman who bowls right-arm off break. He was born in Newcastle upon Tyne, Northumberland.

Crozier made his debut for Northumberland against Hertfordshire in the 1996 Minor Counties Championship. He played Minor counties cricket for Northumberland from 1996 to 2006, making 46 Minor Counties Championship appearances and 31 MCCA Knockout Trophy appearances. He made his List A debut against Ireland in the 1999 NatWest Trophy. He made 7 further List A appearances, the last of which came against Middlesex in the 2005 Cheltenham & Gloucester Trophy. In his 8 List A matches, he took 12 wickets at an average of 30.75, with best figures of 3/30. With the bat, he scored 14 runs at a batting average of 4.66, with a high score of 6 not out.
