= John Fry (cricketer) =

English cricketer

Personal information
- Full name: John Arthur William Fry
- Born: 13 November 1961 (age 64); Streatham, London, England
- Batting: Right-handed

Domestic team information
- Years: Team
- 1999–2002: Surrey Cricket Board

Career statistics
Competition	LA
Matches	5
Runs scored	161
Batting average	40.25
100s/50s	–/2
Top score	90
Balls bowled	–
Wickets	–
Bowling average	–
5 wickets in innings	–
10 wickets in match	–
Best bowling	–
Catches/stumpings	3/–
- Source: Cricinfo, 30 October 2010

John Arthur William Fry (born 13 November 1961) is a former English cricketer. Fry was a right-handed batsman. He was born in Streatham, London.

Fry represented the Surrey Cricket Board in List A cricket. His debut List A match came against Norfolk in the 1999 NatWest Trophy. From 1999 to 2002, he represented the Board in 4 List A matches, the last of which came against the Essex Cricket Board in the 2nd round of the 2003 Cheltenham & Gloucester Trophy which was held in 2002. In his 5 List A matches, he scored 161 runs at a batting average of 40.25, with two half centuries and a high score of 90. In the field he took 3 catches.
