= James Langworth =

Welsh cricketer (born 1973)

Personal information
- Full name: James Howard Langworth
- Born: 24 April 1973 (age 53); Newport, Monmouthshire, Wales
- Batting: Right-handed
- Bowling: Right-arm medium
- Role: Wicket-keeper

Domestic team information
- Years: Team
- 1995–2001: Wales Minor Counties

Career statistics
Competition	LA
Matches	6
Runs scored	124
Batting average	24.80
100s/50s	–/1
Top score	67*
Balls bowled	–
Wickets	–
Bowling average	–
5 wickets in innings	–
10 wickets in match	–
Best bowling	–
Catches/stumpings	3/–
- Source: Cricinfo, 2 January 2011

James Howard Langworth (born 24 April 1973) is a Welsh cricketer. Langworth is a right-handed batsman who bowls right-arm medium pace and who can field as a wicket-keeper. He was born at Newport, Monmouthshire.

Langworth made his Minor Counties Championship debut for Wales Minor Counties in 1995 against Herefordshire. From 1995 to 2001, he represented the team in 37 Championship matches, the last of which came against Devon. His MCCA Knockout Trophy debut for the team came in 1996 against Cornwall. From 1996 to 2001, Langworth represented the team in 10 Trophy matches, the last of which came against the Warwickshire Cricket Board.

His debut List A appearance for the team came in the 1st round of the 1999 NatWest Trophy against Lincolnshire. From 1999 to 2000, he represented the team in 6 List A matches, the last of which came against Essex in the 3rd round of the 2000 NatWest Trophy. In his 6 List A matches, he scored 124 runs at a batting average of 24.80, with a single half century high score of 67*.
