= Stuart Stoneman =

English cricketer (born 1971)

Personal information
- Full name: Stuart Andrew Stoneman
- Born: 12 August 1971 (age 55); Hammersmith, London, England
- Batting: Right-handed
- Bowling: Right-arm fast-medium

Domestic team information
- Years: Team
- 2002: Devon
- 1998–2001: Cheshire

Career statistics
Competition	List A
Matches	5
Runs scored	89
Batting average	29.66
100s/50s	–/–
Top score	34*
Balls bowled	258
Wickets	2
Bowling average	99.00
5 wickets in innings	–
10 wickets in match	–
Best bowling	2/35
Catches/stumpings	1/–
- Source: Cricinfo, 6 February 2011

Stuart Andrew Stoneman (born 12 August 1971) is a former English cricketer. Stoneman was a right-handed batsman who bowled right-arm fast-medium. He was born in Hammersmith, London.

Stoneman made his debut for Cheshire in the 1998 Minor Counties Championship against Oxfordshire. From 1998 to 1999, he represented the county in 8 Championship matches, the last of which came against Wales Minor Counties. He made his MCCA Knockout Trophy debut for the county in 1998 against Cumberland. From 1998 to 2000, he represented the county in 13 Trophy matches, the last of which came against Herefordshire. Stoneman made his debut in List A cricket for Cheshire against Essex in the 1998 NatWest Trophy. He played 3 further List A matches between 1999 and 2001 for Cheshire, the last of which came against Cornwall in the 2nd round of the 2001 Cheltenham & Gloucester Trophy. His final match for the county was notable for Stoneman being permitted to bowl an illegal 11th over.

Stoneman represented the ECB XI from 2000 to 2002, competing in European Championships in Glasgow (2000) and Belfast (2002) and Triple Crown Tournaments in Wales (2000) and England (2001). He was a member of the England Cricket Board squad that won the 2001 Triple Crown and 2002 European Championships.

In 2002, Stoneman joined Devon where he represented the county on a Minor counties basis in just the MCCA Knockout Trophy, playing 6 matches with the last coming against the Warwickshire Cricket Board. He played a single List A match for Devon in the 2002 Cheltenham & Gloucester Trophy 3rd round against Yorkshire. The 2002 season was his only season with Devon. In total, Stoneman played 5 List A matches, he scored 89 runs at a batting average of 29.66, with a high score of 34*. With the ball he took 2 wickets at a bowling average of 99.00, with best figures of 2/35.

Stoneman also played Second XI cricket for the Derbyshire Second XI between 1991 and 1993, playing in 22 Second Eleven Championship and 18 Second Eleven Trophy matches. He also played in 4 Second Eleven Trophy matches for the Minor Counties Under 25's between 1999 and 2000.
