= Michael Bailey (cricketer) =

English cricketer

Personal information
- Full name: Michael John Bailey
- Born: 1 August 1954 (age 72); Cheltenham, Gloucestershire, England
- Batting: Left-handed
- Bowling: Right-arm off-break

Domestic team information
- Years: Team
- 1979–1982: Hampshire
- 1983–1984: Wiltshire
- 1992–1997: Herefordshire

Career statistics
Competition	First-class	List A
Matches	20	3
Runs scored	228	54
Batting average	11.40	31
100s/50s	–/–	–/–
Top score	24	31
Balls bowled	1,750	156
Wickets	18	1
Bowling average	55.33	116.00
5 wickets in innings	1	–
10 wickets in match	–	–
Best bowling	5/89	1/50
Catches/stumpings	8/–	–/–
- Source: Cricinfo, 21 October 2009

Michael John Bailey (born 1 August 1954) is an English former cricketer.

Bailey was born at Cheltenham in August 1954. His father, Arthur, was chairman of the Cheltenham and District Cricket Association. Bailey was a product of Gloucestershire's youth system, but joined Hampshire when he was recommended by former Hampshire bowler Malcolm Heath to their coach, Peter Sainsbury. He made his debut in first-class cricket for Hampshire against Essex at Bournemouth in the 1979 County Championship. He played first-class cricket for Hampshire until 1982, making twenty appearances. Playing principally as a right-arm off break bowler, Bailey took 18 wickets at an average of 55.33; he took one five wicket haul, with figures of 5 for 89 against Northamptonshire in 1980. He scored 228 runs with the bat at a batting average of 11.40, with a highest score of 24. He was noted by Robin Smith, who joined Hampshire in Bailey's final season with the county, as the dressing-room joker in the Hampshire team.

After leaving Hampshire at the end of the 1982 season, he played minor counties cricket for Wiltshire in 1983 and 1984, making six appearances in the Minor Counties Championship and three in the MCCA Knockout Trophy. It was for Wiltshire that Bailey made his debut in List A one-day cricket, against Northamptonshire at Swindon in the 1983 NatWest Trophy, with a second one-day appearance coming against Leicestershire in the 1984 NatWest Trophy. He returned to minor counties cricket almost a decade later to play for Herefordshire in their first season in the Minor Counties Championship in 1992. He played minor counties cricket for Herefordshire until 1997, making 27 appearances in the Minor Counties Championship and two appearances in the MCCA Knockout Trophy. By July 2017, he stood as Herefordshire's third-leading wicket-taker in the Minor Counties Championship with 81, behind Kevin Cooper (221) and Paul Humphries (102). Bailey also made a single one-day appearance for Herefordshire against Durham in the 1995 NatWest Trophy.

== Works cited ==
- Smith, Robin (2019). The Judge: More Than Just a Game. London: Random House. ISBN 978-1-4735-4963-0.
