= Matthew Compton =

Welsh cricketer (born 1979)

Personal information
- Full name: Matthew Stuart Compton
- Born: 4 February 1979 (age 47); Newport, Gwent, Wales
- Batting: Left-handed
- Bowling: Left-arm medium

Domestic team information
- Years: Team
- 1999–2000: Hampshire Cricket Board

Career statistics
Competition	List A
Matches	4
Runs scored	205
Batting average	68.33
100s/50s	1/1
Top score	105*
Catches/stumpings	1/–
- Source: Cricinfo, 28 December 2009

Matthew Stuart Compton (born 4 February 1979) is a former Welsh cricketer. Compton is a left-handed batsman who bowled left-arm medium pace. He was born at Newport in 1979.

Compton made his List-A debut for the Hampshire Cricket Board in the 1999 NatWest Trophy against Suffolk, where on debut he scored 105*. During the 1999 tournament he played a further two matches against Shropshire, where he scored 59 runs, and Glamorgan.

Compton made his last List-A appearance for the Hampshire Cricket Board in the 2000 NatWest Trophy against Huntingdonshire. He ended his one-day career with a batting average of 68.33.

Compton also represented the Hampshire Second XI in six matches between in 1999.

== See also ==
- List of Hampshire Cricket Board List A players
