= Robert Hall (cricketer) =

English cricketer

Personal information
- Full name: Robert Henry Fosbroke Hall
- Born: 1 November 1963 (age 63); Andover, Hampshire, England
- Batting: Right-handed
- Role: Wicketkeeper

Domestic team information
- Years: Team
- 1992–1999: Herefordshire

Career statistics
Competition	List A
Matches	2
Runs scored	82
Batting average	41.00
100s/50s	–/1
Top score	53
Balls bowled	–
Wickets	–
Bowling average	–
5 wickets in innings	–
10 wickets in match	–
Best bowling	–
Catches/stumpings	–/–
- Source: Cricinfo, 26 November 2010

Robert Henry Fosbroke Hall (born 1 November 1963) is a former English cricketer. Hall was a right-handed batsman who played primarily as a wicketkeeper. He was born at Andover, Hampshire.

Hall made his debut for Herefordshire in the 1992 Minor Counties Championship against Devon. From 1992 to 1999, he represented the county in 46 Championship matches, the last of which came against Oxfordshire. His MCCA Knockout Trophy debut for the county came against Shropshire in 1994. From 1994 to 1999, he represented the county in 15 Trophy matches, the last of which came against the Worcestershire Cricket Board.

He also represented Herefordshire in 2 List A matches against Somerset in the 1997 NatWest Trophy and Middlesex in the 1998 NatWest Trophy. In his 2 matches, he scored 82 runs at a batting average of 41.00, with a single half century high score of 53.
