= Stuart Milburn =

English cricketer

Personal information
- Full name: Stuart Mark Milburn
- Born: 29 September 1972 (age 54); Harrogate, Yorkshire, England
- Batting: Right-handed
- Bowling: Right-arm fast-medium

Domestic team information
- Years: Team
- 1992–1995: Yorkshire
- 1996–1997: Hampshire

Career statistics
Competition	First-class	List A
Matches	27	19
Runs scored	292	54
Batting average	13.27	7.71
100s/50s	–/1	–/–
Top score	54*	27
Balls bowled	4,369	827
Wickets	53	15
Bowling average	47.11	44.73
5 wickets in innings	–	–
10 wickets in match	–	–
Best bowling	4/38	2/7
Catches/stumpings	1/–	4/–
- Source: Cricinfo, 19 August 2023

Stuart Mark Milburn (born 29 September 1972) is a former English first-class cricketer.

Milburn was born at Harrogate in September 1972. He made his debut in first-class cricket for Yorkshire against Worcestershire at Worcester in the 1992 County Championship. He featured infrequently in the Yorkshire side until 1995, making six first-class appearances. Playing as a right-arm fast-medium bowler, he took 14 wickets at an average of 30.78, with best figures of 4 for 68. In his final season at Yorkshire, he also made four appearances in List A one-day cricket in the Axa Equity & Law League. He was released by Yorkshire at the end of the 1995 season, alongside teammates Paul Grayson and Simon Kellett.

Milburn joined Hampshire ahead of the 1996 season. He made his debut for Hampshire in a one-day match against Ireland in the 1996 Benson & Hedges Cup, with his first-class debut for the county coming against Oxford University in the same season. He played for Hampshire for two seasons, making 21 first-class and 15 one-day appearances. In first-class cricket, he took 39 wickets for Hampshire at an average of 52.97, with best figures of 4 for 38. As a lower order batsman, he recorded his only half century when he made an unbeaten 54 against the touring Indians at Southampton in 1996. In one-day cricket, he took 13 wickets for Hampshire at an average of 42.53, with best figures of 2 for 7. Having spent part of the 1997 season injured, he was released by Hampshire at the end of that season. Following his release, Milburn returned to the North of England, where he played club cricket in the Nidderdale Cricket League.
