= Chris Ellison (cricketer) =

English cricketer (born 1979)

Chris Ellison (born 12 April 1979) was an English cricketer. He was a right-handed batsman and left-arm slow bowler who played for Cornwall. He was born in Sheffield.

Ellison, who played in the Second XI Championship for Sussex and Yorkshire between 1998 and 2000, and in the Minor Counties Trophy for Cornwall, Durham Cricket Board, and Yorkshire, made a single List A appearance for Cornwall during the 1999 NatWest Trophy, against Cumberland. From the lower order, he scored 5 runs. He took figures of 3–64 with the ball.

As of 2009, Ellison still plays for Henley in the Home Counties Premier League.

Ellison's brother, Simon, played for Cornwall in the Minor Counties Championship, and still plays for club side St. Austell as of 2009.
