= Andy Griffin (cricketer) =

English cricketer

Personal information
- Full name: Andrew Declan Griffin
- Born: 9 January 1972 (age 54); Hammersmith, London
- Batting: Right-handed
- Role: Wicket-keeper

Domestic team information
- Years: Team
- 1993–2000: Hertfordshire

Career statistics
| Competition | List A |
|---|---|
| Matches | 4 |
| Runs scored | 227 |
| Batting average | 113.50 |
| 100s/50s | 1/1 |
| Top score | 121 |
| Catches/stumpings | 7/3 |
- Source: Cricinfo, 1 August 2011

Andrew Declan Griffin (born 9 January 1972) is a former English cricketer. Griffin played for Hertfordshire County Cricket Club as a wicket-keeper.

Griffin made his debut for Hertfordshire against Cumberland in the 1993 Minor Counties Championship. He played Minor counties cricket for Hertfordshire from 1993 to 2000, making 48 Minor Counties Championship and eight MCCA Knockout Trophy appearances.

Griffin made his List A cricket debut against the Leicestershire Cricket Board in the 1999 NatWest Trophy, scoring 121 off 93 balls and adding 225 for the fourth wicket with Kafeel Jahangir. He made a further three List A appearances for the county, the last of which came against Cambridgeshire in the 2000 NatWest Trophy.
