= Lee Caldicott =

English cricketer

Personal information
- Full name: Lee Brian Caldicott
- Born: 26 June 1969 (age 57); Stourport-on-Severn, Worcestershire, England
- Batting: Right-handed
- Bowling: Left-arm fast-medium

Domestic team information
- Years: Team
- 1997–1999: Herefordshire

Career statistics
| Competition | LA |
|---|---|
| Matches | 1 |
| Runs scored | 35 |
| Batting average | – |
| 100s/50s | –/– |
| Top score | 35* |
| Balls bowled | 47 |
| Wickets | 3 |
| Bowling average | 12.33 |
| 5 wickets in innings | – |
| 10 wickets in match | – |
| Best bowling | 3/37 |
| Catches/stumpings | –/– |
- Source: Cricinfo, 25 November 2010

Lee Brian Caldicott (born 26 June 1969) is a former English cricketer. Caldicott was a right-handed batsman who bowled right-arm fast-medium. He was born at Stourport-on-Severn, Worcestershire.

Caldicott made his debut for Herefordshire in the 1997 Minor Counties Championship against Devon. From 1997 to 1998, he represented the county in 4 Championship matches, the last of which came against Dorset. In 1999, he played 2 MCCA Knockout Trophy matches for the county against Wales Minor Counties and Wiltshire.

It was in 1999 that he made a single List A appearance for Herefordshire against Wiltshire in the 2nd round of the 1999 NatWest Trophy. In his only List A match, he scored an unbeaten 35 runs and with the ball he took 3 wickets at a bowling average of 12.33, with best figures of 3/37.
