= Chris Tolley =

English cricketer (born 1967)

Christopher Mark Tolley is a retired first-class cricketer who played for Worcestershire and Nottinghamshire. In 2002 Tolley was appointed County Academy Director for Nottinghamshire.
