= Andy Collins (artist) =

American artist

- Born: 1971; Atlanta, Georgia
- Education: School of Visual Arts

Andy Collins (born 1971, Atlanta, US) is an artist based in New York.

Collins studied at Atlanta College of Art in 1994, and completed his MFA at School of Visual Arts, New York, in 1999.

Collins has exhibited in a number of shows including “The Galleries Show” at the Royal Academy in London and “Extreme Abstraction” at Albright-Knox Art Gallery, Buffalo. He has shown internationally at galleries such as Krinzinger Projekte in Vienna and Ghislaine Hussenot, Paris.
