= James Ralph (cricketer) =

English cricketer

Cricket information
- Batting: Right-handed
- Bowling: Leg-break

Career statistics
Competition	First-class	List A
Matches	1	11
Runs scored	0	329
Batting average	0.00	41.12
100s/50s	0/0	1/2
Top score	0	102*
Balls bowled	–	66
Wickets	–	2
Bowling average	–	14.00
5 wickets in innings	–	0
10 wickets in match	–	0
Best bowling	–	2/19
Catches/stumpings	1/–	5/–
- Source: Cricinfo, 12 April 2023

James Trevor Ralph (born 9 October 1975) is an English cricketer who played one first-class match for Worcestershire and later played minor counties cricket for Shropshire. He was born in Kidderminster, Worcestershire.

As well as playing club cricket for Kidderminster, Ralph played many times for Worcestershire's Second XI between 1994 and 1996, and a run of good scores in the latter year earned him what turned out to be his only first-class appearance, against South Africa A in August. He failed to grasp the opportunity, however, being dismissed for a pair, and his brief first-class career ended almost as soon as it had begun.

In 1998 Ralph returned to representative cricket with Shropshire in the Minor Counties Championship, and made a number of List A appearances for them in the NatWest Trophy and its successor the C&G Trophy. Perhaps his best performance came against Somerset at Telford in 2000: although Shropshire lost the game by 27 runs, Ralph's unbeaten 102 gained him the man-of-the-match award. He took his only two List A wickets against Buckinghamshire in 2002.

In club cricket, after playing for some years for Shropshire clubs, and most recently for Shifnal, he returned to Kidderminster Victoria for the 2009 season.

In 2012 Ralph moved to Bridgnorth CC in Division three of the Birmingham League, where he was consistently one of the best batsman in the Division. He helped them to a double promotion to Division One but has since left returning to a Shropshire League side.

Ralph ended his minor counties career in 2017 having represented Shropshire in over 100 championship games he is one of 12 players ever to do so.
