= Peter Deakin (cricketer) =

English cricketer

Personal information
- Full name: Peter James Deakin
- Born: 9 December 1970 (age 55); Liverpool, Lancashire, England
- Batting: Right-handed
- Bowling: Right-arm off break

Domestic team information
- Years: Team
- 1999–2006: Dorset
- 1996: Cambridge University

Career statistics
Competition	FC	LA
Matches	6	6
Runs scored	100	52
Batting average	20.00	8.66
100s/50s	–/–	–/–
Top score	24*	23
Balls bowled	427	80
Wickets	9	4
Bowling average	27.66	15.50
5 wickets in innings	–	–
10 wickets in match	–	–
Best bowling	2/17	2/6
Catches/stumpings	–/–	4/–
- Source: Cricinfo, 16 March 2010

Peter James Deakin (born 9 December 1970) is a former English first-class cricketer. Deakin was a right-handed batsman who bowled right-arm off break.

Deakin was an undergraduate at Durham University before taking his PGCE at the University of Cambridge. He made his first-class debut for Cambridge University in 1996 against Derbyshire. Deakin represented the university in 6 first-class matches during the 1996 season, with his final first-class match for the university coming against Oxford University. In his 6 matches for the university he scored 100 runs at a batting average of 20.00 and a high score of 23*. With the ball he took 9 wickets at a bowling average of 27.66, with best figures of 2/17.

In 1999 Deakin made his debut for Dorset in the 1999 NatWest Trophy 2nd round against Scotland, which was also Deakin's debut List-A match. Deakin played a further 5 List-A matches for Dorset from 1999 to 2004, with his final List-A match for Dorset coming against Yorkshire in the 2004 Cheltenham & Gloucester Trophy. In his 6 List-A matches for Dorset he took 4 wickets at an average of 15.50, with best figures of 2/6.

In 1999 Deakin also made his Minor Counties Championship debut for Dorset against Herefordshire. From 1999 to 2006 Deakin represented Dorset in 42 Minor Counties matches, with his final match for Dorset coming against Wiltshire.
