= Piran Holloway =

English cricketer

Personal information
- Full name: Piran Christopher Laity Holloway
- Born: 1 October 1970 (age 56); Helston, Cornwall, England
- Batting: Left-handed
- Role: Wicket-keeper

Domestic team information
- Years: Team
- 1994–2003: Somerset
- 1988–1993: Warwickshire
- 2002: Cornwall
- First-class debut: 13 July 1988 Warwickshire v Worcestershire
- Last First-class: 4 June 2003 Somerset v Worcestershire
- List A debut: 10 July 1988 Warwickshire v Sussex
- Last List A: 22 September 2002 Somerset v Durham

Career statistics
| Competition | FC | LA |
|---|---|---|
| Matches | 128 | 133 |
| Runs scored | 5923 | 2751 |
| Batting average | 31.50 | 27.51 |
| 100s/50s | 9/32 | 3/17 |
| Top score | 168 | 117 |
| Balls bowled | 76 | 0 |
| Wickets | 0 | – |
| Bowling average | – | – |
| 5 wickets in innings | 0 | – |
| 10 wickets in match | 0 | – |
| Best bowling | 0/0 | – |
| Catches/stumpings | 86/1 | 53/8 |
- Source: , 13 February 2010

Piran Christopher Laity Holloway (born 1 October 1970) is an English former first-class cricketer. Between 1988 and 2003, he appeared for Warwickshire and Somerset. A left-handed batsman and wicket-keeper, Holloway made 14 appearances for England Under-19s.
