= Paul Humphries =

English cricketer (born 1965)

Personal information
- Full name: Paul Jonathan Humphries
- Born: 20 October 1965 (age 61); Bromsgrove, Worcestershire, England
- Batting: Right-handed
- Bowling: Right-arm fast-medium

Domestic team information
- Years: Team
- 1997–2001: Herefordshire
- 1995: Staffordshire
- 1993–1994: Herefordshire

Career statistics
Competition	List A
Matches	5
Runs scored	6
Batting average	–
100s/50s	–/–
Top score	5*
Balls bowled	270
Wickets	6
Bowling average	30.83
5 wickets in innings	–
10 wickets in match	–
Best bowling	2/25
Catches/stumpings	–/–
- Source: Cricinfo, 26 November 2010

Paul Jonathan Humphries (born 20 October 1965) is a former English cricketer. Humphries was a right-handed batsman who bowled right-arm fast-medium. He was born at Bromsgrove, Worcestershire.

Paul Humphries made his debut for Herefordshire in the 1993 Minor Counties Championship against Cheshire. From 1993 to 1994, he played 3 further Championship matches for the county.

In 1995, he joined Staffordshire. His debut for the county came in the Minor Counties Championship against Hertfordshire. During the 1995 season, he played 3 further Championship matches, the last of which came against Cumberland.

In 1997, he rejoined Herefordshire. It was during his second spell that he made his debut in the MCCA Knockout Trophy against Wiltshire in 1998. From 1998 to 2001, he represented the county in 15 Trophy matches, the last of which came against the Worcestershire Cricket Board. In his second spell with the county, he made a further 31 Minor Counties Championship matches, the last of which came against Oxfordshire in 2001.

He also represented Herefordshire in List A cricket during his second stint. His debut List A match came against Middlesex in the 1998 NatWest Trophy. From 1998 to 2001, he represented the county in 5 List A matches, the last of which came against the Gloucestershire Cricket Board in the 2nd round of the 2001 Cheltenham & Gloucester Trophy. In his 5 matches, he took 6 wickets at a bowling average of 30.83, with best figures of 2/25.
