= Kirk Stewart =

English cricketer (born 1974)

Personal information
- Full name: Kirk David Edward Stewart
- Born: 1 January 1974 (age 52); Marandellas, Rhodesia
- Batting: Right-handed
- Bowling: Right-arm fast-medium

Domestic team information
- Years: Team
- 1999: Hampshire Cricket Board
- 2000: Hertfordshire

Career statistics
| Competition | List A |
|---|---|
| Matches | 3 |
| Runs scored | 2 |
| Batting average | 1.00 |
| 100s/50s | 0/0 |
| Top score | 2 |
| Balls bowled | 156 |
| Wickets | 7 |
| Bowling average | 18.71 |
| 5 wickets in innings | 0 |
| 10 wickets in match | 0 |
| Best bowling | 3/52 |
| Catches/stumpings | 0/– |
- Source: Cricinfo, 28 December 2009

Kirk David Edward Stewart (born 1 January 1974) is an English former cricketer. Born in Rhodesia, Stewart was a right-handed batsman who bowled arm fast-medium.

Stewart made his List-A debut for the Hampshire Cricket Board in the 1999 NatWest Trophy against the Suffolk. Stewart played in a further two matches in the tournament against Shropshire and Glamorgan County Cricket Club. In his brief List-A career Stewart took seven wickets at an average of 18.71, with best figures of 3/52 coming on debut against Suffolk.

In the same season Stewart played seven matches for Hampshire Second XI. In 2001 Stewart played for Hertfordshire in two matches against Suffolk and Buckinghamshire in the Minor Counties Championship.
