= Andrew Pugh =

English cricketer (born 1969)

Personal information
- Full name: Andrew Joseph Pugh
- Born: 26 May 1969 (age 57); Torquay, Devon, England
- Batting: Right-handed
- Bowling: Right-arm medium

Domestic team information
- Years: Team
- 1989–2005: Devon

Career statistics
Competition	List A
Matches	18
Runs scored	271
Batting average	16.93
100s/50s	–/1
Top score	54
Balls bowled	192
Wickets	7
Bowling average	24.57
5 wickets in innings	–
10 wickets in match	–
Best bowling	2/4
Catches/stumpings	10/–
- Source: Cricinfo, 9 February 2011

Andrew 'Andy' Joseph Pugh (born 26 May 1969) is a former English cricketer. Pugh was a right-handed batsman who bowled right-arm medium pace. He was born in Torquay, Devon.

== Minor counties cricket ==
Pugh made his debut for Devon in the 1989 Minor Counties Championship against Cornwall, in doing so beginning a 16-year playing career with the county. From 1989 to 2005, he represented the county in 113 Championship matches, the last of which came against Wiltshire. He made his MCCA Knockout Trophy debut for the county in 1990 against Cornwall. From 1990 to 2004, he represented the county in 44 Trophy matches, the last of which came against Suffolk. During this playing career with Devon, he won two Minor Counties Championships and two MCCA Knockout Trophy's.

Outside of the Minor counties arena, Pugh played Second XI cricket for the Sussex Second XI (1986–1987) and the Somerset Second XI in 1997.

== List A cricket ==
Pugh played List A cricket for Devon at a time when they were permitted to take part in the domestic one-day competition, making his debut in that format in the 1990 NatWest Trophy against Somerset. From 1990 to 2005, he represented Devon in 18 List A matches, the last of which came in the 2005 Cheltenham & Gloucester Trophy against Essex. In his 15 List A matches, he scored 271 runs at a batting average of 16.93, with a single half century high score of 54. In the field he took 10 catches. With the ball he took 7 wickets at a bowling average of 24.57, with best figures of 2/4 against Staffordshire in the 2000 NatWest Trophy.
