= Ross Lupton =

Australian cricketer (born 1975)

Personal information
- Full name: Ross David Lupton
- Born: 6 January 1975 (age 51); Warwick, Queensland, Australia
- Batting: Right-handed
- Bowling: Right-arm medium

Domestic team information
- Years: Team
- 2000: Herefordshire

Career statistics
Competition	LA
Matches	1
Runs scored	24
Batting average	24.00
100s/50s	–/–
Top score	24
Balls bowled	48
Wickets	2
Bowling average	16.50
5 wickets in innings	–
10 wickets in match	–
Best bowling	2/33
Catches/stumpings	–/–
- Source: Cricinfo, 25 November 2010

Ross David Lupton (born 6 January 1975) is a former Australian cricketer. Lupton was a right-handed batsman who bowled right-arm medium pace. He was born at Warwick, Queensland.

Lupton made a single List A match for Herefordshire against the Sussex Cricket Board in the 1st round of the 2000 NatWest Trophy. In his only List A match, he scored 24 runs and with the ball he took 2 wickets at a bowling average of 16.50, with best figures of 2/33.
