= Matthew Evans (cricketer) =

English cricketer

Personal information
- Full name: Matthew Robert Evans
- Born: 27 November 1974 (age 51); Gravesend, Kent, England
- Batting: Right-handed
- Bowling: Right-arm fast-medium

Domestic team information
- Years: Team
- 1996: British Universities
- 1993–2002: Hertfordshire

Career statistics
Competition	List A
Matches	8
Runs scored	137
Batting average	22.83
100s/50s	–/–
Top score	37
Balls bowled	235
Wickets	8
Bowling average	33.62
5 wickets in innings	–
10 wickets in match	–
Best bowling	3/64
Catches/stumpings	4/–
- Source: Cricinfo, 1 August 2011

Matthew Robert Evans (born 27 November 1974) is a former English cricketer. Evans was a right-handed batsman who bowled right-arm fast-medium. He was born in Gravesend, Kent.

Evans made his debut for Hertfordshire against Norfolk in the 1993 Minor Counties Championship. He played Minor counties cricket for Hertfordshire from 1993 to 2000, making 36 Minor Counties Championship appearances and 7 MCCA Knockout Trophy appearances. While studying at Loughborough University Evans made his List A debut for British Universities against Kent in the 1996 Benson & Hedges Cup. He made 3 further appearances in that competition for the team, the last of which came against Middlesex. In his 4 appearances for the team, he scored 34 runs at an average of 17.00, with a high score of 16 not out. With the ball, he took 2 wickets at a bowling average of 12.00, with best figures of 2/9. He made his first List A appearance for Hertfordshire in the 1999 NatWest Trophy against the Leicestershire Cricket Board, with him going on to make 3 further List A appearances for the county, the last of which came against Bedfordshire in the 1st round of the 2003 Cheltenham & Gloucester Trophy, which was played in 2002. In his 4 matches for the county in that format, he scored 103 runs at an average of 25.75, with a high score of 37. With the ball, he took 6 wickets at an average of 40.83, with best figures of 3/64.
