= Neil Hancock =

English cricketer (born 1976)

Personal information
- Full name: Neil David Hancock
- Born: 13 April 1976 (age 50); Casino, New South Wales, Australia
- Batting: Right-handed
- Bowling: Right-arm fast-medium

Domestic team information
- Years: Team
- 1999–2011: Devon
- 2004: Somerset
- 2010: Unicorns (squad no. 8)
- LA debut: 19 May 1999 Devon v Berkshire
- Last LA: 30 August 2010 Unicorns v Lancashire
- T20 debut: 2 July 2004 Somerset v Warwickshire
- Last T20: 5 July 2004 Somerset v Glamorgan

Career statistics
| Competition | List A | Twenty20 |
|---|---|---|
| Matches | 21 | 2 |
| Runs scored | 449 | 9 |
| Batting average | 29.93 | 4.50 |
| 100s/50s | 1/1 | 0/0 |
| Top score | 113* | 7 |
| Balls bowled | 856 | 12 |
| Wickets | 26 | 1 |
| Bowling average | 26.76 | 25.00 |
| 5 wickets in innings | 1 | 0 |
| 10 wickets in match | 0 | 0 |
| Best bowling | 5/64 | 1/9 |
| Catches/stumpings | 8/– | 2/– |
- Source: CricketArchive, 19 September 2021

Neil David Hancock (born 13 April 1976) is a cricketer who played limited overs cricket for Unicorns, Devon and Somerset.

Hancock made his List A debut for Devon in 1999 and is now the captain for the county, as well as playing for local side, Bovey Tracey. He has played 10 List A games for Devon in the C&G Trophy which including minor counties until 2006. Hancock also played 3 games for Somerset in 2004 (one List A and two Twenty20). His highest List A score came on his debut against Berkshire when he scored 113 not out; he was named man of the match.

In 2010, Hancock was selected as one of 21 players to form the first Unicorns squad to take part in the 2010 Clydesdale Bank 40 domestic limited overs competition against the regular first-class counties. The Unicorns were made up of 15 former county cricket professionals and 6 young cricketers looking to make it in the professional game.

Hancock was born and raised in Casino, New South Wales, Australia, but came to England in 1996 when he joined Torquay Cricket Club; he has since started a family, and has completed his residential qualifications allowing him to become an English cricketer.
