= Grant Sheen =

English cricketer (born 1974)

Personal information
- Full name: Grant John James Sheen
- Born: 21 June 1974 (age 52); Bromley, Kent, England
- Batting: Right-handed
- Bowling: Right-arm off break

Domestic team information
- Years: Team
- 1999–2001: Kent Cricket Board

Career statistics
Competition	List A
Matches	5
Runs scored	70
Batting average	23.33
100s/50s	0/0
Top score	45
Balls bowled	162
Wickets	7
Bowling average	20.85
5 wickets in innings	0
10 wickets in match	0
Best bowling	2/31
Catches/stumpings	0/–
- Source: Cricinfo, 13 November 2010

Grant John James Sheen (born 21 June 1974) is an English former cricketer. Sheen is a right-handed batsman who bowls right-arm off break He was born at Bromley, Kent.

Sheen represented the Kent Cricket Board in List A cricket. His debut List A match came against Denmark in the 1999 NatWest Trophy. From 1999 to 2001, he represented the Board in 5 List A matches, the last of which came against Buckinghamshire in the 2001 Cheltenham & Gloucester Trophy. In his 5 List A matches, he scored 70 runs at a batting average of 23.33, with a high score of 45. With the ball he took 7 wickets at a bowling average of 20.85, with best figures of 2/31.

He played club cricket for Bromley Cricket Club in the Kent Cricket League.
