= Richard Harding (cricketer) =

English cricketer

Personal information
- Full name: Richard John Harding
- Born: 14 October 1966 (age 60); Bristol, England
- Batting: Right-handed
- Bowling: Right-arm off break

Domestic team information
- Years: Team
- 1994–1998: Herefordshire

Career statistics
| Competition | LA |
|---|---|
| Matches | 3 |
| Runs scored | 29 |
| Batting average | 14.50 |
| 100s/50s | 0/0 |
| Top score | 17 |
| Balls bowled | 156 |
| Wickets | 0 |
| Bowling average | – |
| 5 wickets in innings | – |
| 10 wickets in match | – |
| Best bowling | – |
| Catches/stumpings | 1/– |
- Source: Cricinfo, 26 November 2010

Richard John Harding (born 14 October 1966) is a former English cricketer. Harding was a right-handed batsman who bowled right-arm off break. He was born in Bristol.

Harding made his debut for Herefordshire in the 1994 Minor Counties Championship against Shropshire. From 1994 to 1998, he represented the county in 17 Championship matches, the last of which came against Dorset. His MCCA Knockout Trophy debut for the county came against Shropshire in 1994. From 1994 to 1998, he represented the county in 9 Trophy matches, the last of which came against Wales Minor Counties.

He also represented Herefordshire in 3 List A matches. These came against Durham in the 1995 NatWest Trophy, Somerset in the 1997 NatWest Trophy and Middlesex in the 1998 NatWest Trophy. In his 3 matches, he scored 29 runs at a batting average of 14.50, with a high score of 17. In the field he took a single catch. With the ball, he bowled 26 wicket-less overs.
