= Stephen Crawley =

Scottish cricketer (born 1962)

Stephen Crawley (born 16 September 1962 in Cheshire, England) is a former Scottish cricketer. He was a right-handed batsman and right-arm fast-medium bowler. In 1981 he played for England Schools who were captained by Hugh Morris and included Peter Moores, the future England coach. He spent his early career playing second XI cricket for Lancashire and was 12th man for the 5th day of the 1982 Test match v India after Ian Botham had broken his toe) and Leicestershire in addition to minor counties cricket for Cheshire, for whom he played a handful of List A matches.

Crawley moved to Scotland through work in July 1993, as National Sales Manager (Director Designate) for the Caledonian Brewery in Edinburgh (eventually becoming Managing Director of the Caledonian Brewery in 2001) and qualified to play for Scotland through residence. He made his début for Scotland against Worcestershire on 23 April 1995. He went on to play for Scotland 14 times. He was not selected for the 1999 World Cup, but did play in the cricket tournament at the 1998 Commonwealth Games. In 1998, Crawley got Man of the Match in the Scottish Cup Final at Hamilton Crescent in Glasgow, scoring 101 not out, remarkable given it was his father's funeral on Wirral the day before, and he only got back from holiday in Menorca into Edinburgh late on Friday night. In 1999, Crawley received the gold award for 109 not out in the 1st round Nat West match v the Nottinghamshire Board XI in a match played at West Lothian CC. Frustratingly for Stephen and for Craig Wright, (both players just missing out on the World Cup squad) who took 5 wickets, the game was deemed a non cap game for Scotland as there was a squad playing in the World Cup even though it was an A list match?

In December 2015, the newly formed Higsons Brewery owned by Stephen Crawley submitted planning permission for a brewery and visitor centre in Liverpool.

In February 2016, Stephen Crawley acquired The Liverpool Craft Beer Company, known locally for its Love Lane Pale Ale. In 2017 via an EIS fundraise Stephen and his shareholders opened the Tap & Still, 62-64 Bridgewater Street, L1 0AY in the heart of the Baltic Triangle as the new home for Love Lane, also brewing Higsons Cask Ales and making The Ginsmiths of Liverpool gins.
