= Karl Pearson (cricketer) =

English cricketer (born 1974)

Personal information
- Full name: Karl Pearson
- Born: 14 August 1974 (age 52); Stourbridge, Worcestershire, England
- Batting: Right-handed
- Bowling: Right-arm medium

Domestic team information
- Years: Team
- 1997–2003: Herefordshire

Career statistics
Competition	LA
Matches	8
Runs scored	115
Batting average	23.00
100s/50s	–/–
Top score	35
Balls bowled	150
Wickets	4
Bowling average	30.25
5 wickets in innings	–
10 wickets in match	–
Best bowling	2/18
Catches/stumpings	–/–
- Source: Cricinfo, 26 November 2010

Karl Pearson (born 14 August 1974) is an English cricketer. Pearson is a right-handed batsman who bowls right-arm medium pace. He was born at Stourbridge, Worcestershire.

Pearson made his debut for Herefordshire in the 1997 Minor Counties Championship against Dorset. From 1997 to 2003, he represented the county in 43 Championship matches, the last of which came against Cornwall. His MCCA Knockout Trophy debut for the county came against the Worcestershire Cricket Board in 1998. From 1998 to 2003, he represented the county in 18 Trophy matches, the last of which came against Staffordshire.

He also represented Herefordshire in List A cricket. His debut List A match came against Wiltshire in the 1999 NatWest Trophy. From 1999 to 2002, he represented the county in 8 List A matches, the last of which came against the Durham Cricket Board in the 2nd round of the 2003 Cheltenham & Gloucester Trophy, which was played in 2002. In 8 matches, he scored 115 runs at a batting average of 23.00, with a high score of 35. With the ball he took 4 wickets at a bowling average of 30.25, with best figures of 2/18.

He currently plays club cricket for Sevenoaks Vine Cricket Club in the Kent Cricket League.
