= John Hughes (cricketer, born 1971) =

English cricketer (born 1971)

Personal information
- Full name: John Gareth Hughes
- Born: 3 May 1971 (age 55); Wellingborough, Northamptonshire
- Batting: Right-handed
- Bowling: Right-arm medium

Domestic team information
- Years: Team
- 1990–1997: Northamptonshire
- 1998–2001: Bedfordshire

Career statistics
Competition	First-class	List A
Matches	20	21
Runs scored	128	119
Batting average	5.33	9.91
100s/50s	0/0	0/0
Top score	17	30
Balls bowled	2,725	758
Wickets	37	14
Bowling average	43.83	43.21
5 wickets in innings	1	0
10 wickets in match	0	0
Best bowling	5/69	3/17
Catches/stumpings	5/–	3/–
- Source: Cricinfo, 31 October 2011

John Gareth Hughes (born 3 May 1971) is a former English cricketer. Hughes was a right-handed batsman who bowled right-arm medium pace. He was born in Wellingborough, Northamptonshire.

Hughes made his first-class cricket debut for Northamptonshire against Surrey in the 1990 County Championship. He made nineteen first-class appearances for the county, the last of which came against Hampshire in the 1997 County Championship. A bowler, Hughes took 37 wickets at an average of 43.83, with best figures of 5/69. These figures, his only five wicket haul, came against Hampshire in 1994. A tailend batsman, Hughes scored 128 runs at a batting average of 5.33, with a high score of 17. He made his List A debut against Nottinghamshire in the 1990 Refuge Assurance League. He made nine further List A appearances for Northamptonshire, the last of which came against the touring Australians in 1997. He took 6 wickets in his ten matches, which came at an average of 43.83 and best figures of 2/39. While playing for Northamptonshire he also undertook university studies, in doing so he appeared once for the Combined Universities in the 1994 Benson & Hedges Cup.

Leaving Northamptonshire at the end of the 1997 season, he proceeded to join Bedfordshire for the 1998 season. He made his debut for the county in the MCCA Knockout Trophy against the Surrey Cricket Board. Between 1998 and 2001, he made 24 Minor Counties Championship appearances and sixteen MCCA Knockout Trophy appearances. He made his first List A appearance for Bedfordshire in the 1998 NatWest Trophy against Glamorgan, and between 1998 and 2001 he made nine further List A appearances for the county, the last of which came against Devon in the 2nd round of the 2002 Cheltenham & Gloucester Trophy, which was played in 2001 to avoid fixture congestion the following season. In his ten List A appearances for Bedfordshire, he took 8 wickets at an average of 39.37, with best figures of 3/17, while with the bat he scored 77 runs at an average of 12.83, with a high score of 30.
