= Andrew Collins (cricketer) =

English cricketer (1972–1999)

Personal information
- Full name: Andrew James Collins
- Born: 24 July 1972; Andover, Hampshire, England
- Died: 25 December 1999 (aged 27); London, England
- Batting: Right-handed
- Bowling: Right-arm medium

Domestic team information
- Years: Team
- 1999: Herefordshire
- 1998–1999: Wiltshire
- 1997: Berkshire
- 1995–1996: Herefordshire

Career statistics
Competition	LA
Matches	2
Runs scored	44
Batting average	44.00
100s/50s	–/–
Top score	24*
Balls bowled	120
Wickets	4
Bowling average	17.25
5 wickets in innings	–
10 wickets in match	–
Best bowling	3/30
Catches/stumpings	2/–
- Source: CricketArchive, 12 October 2010

Andrew James Collins (24 July 1972 – 25 December 1999) was an English cricketer. Collins was a right-handed batsman who bowled right-arm medium pace. He was born in Andover, Hampshire.

Collins made his Minor Counties Championship debut for Herefordshire in 1995 against Dorset. From 1995 to 1996, he represented the county in 6 Minor Counties Championship matches, the last of which came against Cornwall. In 1999, he played a single Championship match for Herefordshire against Berkshire.

In 1997, Collins played a single Minor Counties Championship match for Berkshire against Oxfordshire and the following season he joined Wiltshire.

He played a single Championship match for Wiltshire in 1998 against Dorset and followed that up in 1999 with his final Championship match for the county against Devon. Collins also represented Wiltshire in the MCCA Knockout Trophy. His debut in that competition came against the Herefordshire in 1998. He represented the county in 2 further Trophy matches in 1999 against Herefordshire and the Worcestershire Cricket Board.

Collins also represented Wiltshire in 2 List A matches. His first came against the Northamptonshire Cricket Board and his second came against Herefordshire, both in the 1999 NatWest Trophy. In his 2 matches, he scored 44 runs at a batting average of 44.00, with a high score of 24*. His inflated average was down to his one not out innings. In the field he took 2 catches. With the ball he took 4 wickets at a bowling average of 17.25, with best figures of 3/30.

Collins's Minor counties career was cut short when he died in London on Christmas Day in 1999.
