= Christopher Boroughs =

English cricketer

Personal information
- Full name: Christopher William Boroughs
- Born: 21 April 1975 (age 51); Stourbridge, Worcestershire, England
- Batting: Right-handed
- Bowling: Right-arm medium
- Role: Herefordshire captain

Domestic team information
- Years: Team
- 1998–2012: Herefordshire

Career statistics
Competition	LA
Matches	12
Runs scored	322
Batting average	32.20
100s/50s	–/3
Top score	72
Balls bowled	216
Wickets	4
Bowling average	38.75
5 wickets in innings	–
10 wickets in match	–
Best bowling	2/41
Catches/stumpings	4/–
- Source: Cricinfo, 26 November 2010

Christopher William Boroughs (born 21 April 1975) is an English cricketer. Boroughs is a right-handed batsman who bowls right-arm medium pace. He was born in Stourbridge, Worcestershire.

Boroughs made his debut for Herefordshire in the 1998 MCCA Knockout Trophy against Wiltshire. From 1998 to present, he has represented the county in 44 Trophy matches. His Minor Counties Championship debut came against Dorset in 1998. From 1998 to present, he has represented the county in 78 Championship matches.

He also represented Herefordshire in List A cricket. His debut List A match came against Middlesex at Lord's in the 1998 NatWest Trophy. From 1998 to 2004, he represented the county in 12 List A matches, the last of which came against Worcestershire in the 2nd round of the 2004 Cheltenham & Gloucester Trophy. In his 12 matches, he scored 322 runs at a batting average of 32.20, with 3 half centuries and a high score of 72. In the field he took 4 catches. With the ball he took 4 wickets at a bowling average of 38.75, with best figures of 2/41.

Boroughs was captain of Herefordshire until 2012 and captained Auckland A in 2002.
