= Robert Hughes (cricketer) =

English cricketer

Personal information
- Full name: Robert David Hughes
- Born: 26 October 1973 (age 53); Rugby, Warwickshire, England
- Batting: Left-handed

Domestic team information
- Years: Team
- 1998–2004: Herefordshire

Career statistics
Competition	LA
Matches	7
Runs scored	78
Batting average	13.00
100s/50s	–/–
Top score	39
Balls bowled	–
Wickets	–
Bowling average	–
5 wickets in innings	–
10 wickets in match	–
Best bowling	–
Catches/stumpings	1/–
- Source: Cricinfo, 26 November 2010

Robert David Hughes (born 26 October 1973) is a former English cricketer. Hughes was a left-handed batsman. He was born at Rugby, Warwickshire.

Hughes made his debut for Herefordshire in the 1998 MCCA Knockout Trophy against Wiltshire in 1998. From 1998 to 2004, he represented the county in 19 Trophy matches, the last of which came against Wiltshire. His Minor Counties Championship debut came against Oxfordshire in 1999. From 1999 to 2004, he represented the county in 44 Championship matches, the last of which came against Berkshire.

He also represented Herefordshire in List A cricket. His debut List A match came against Wiltshire in the 1999 NatWest Trophy. From 1999 to 2004, he represented the county in 7 List A matches, the last of which came against Worcestershire in the 2nd round of the 2004 Cheltenham & Gloucester Trophy. In his 7 matches, he scored 78 runs at a batting average of 13.00, with a high score of 39, while in the field he took a single catch.
