= Mark Lowrey (cricketer) =

English cricketer

Personal information
- Full name: Mark John Lowrey
- Born: 13 September 1971 (age 55); Hampstead, London, England
- Batting: Right-handed
- Bowling: Right-arm off break

Domestic team information
- Years: Team
- 1999: Middlesex Cricket Board
- 1990–1991: Cambridge University

Career statistics
| Competition | FC | LA |
|---|---|---|
| Matches | 20 | 1 |
| Runs scored | 597 | 24 |
| Batting average | 19.90 | 24.00 |
| 100s/50s | –/3 | –/– |
| Top score | 72 | 24 |
| Balls bowled | 1,724 | 60 |
| Wickets | 19 | 1 |
| Bowling average | 51.52 | 38.00 |
| 5 wickets in innings | – | – |
| 10 wickets in match | – | – |
| Best bowling | 3/31 | 1/38 |
| Catches/stumpings | 3/– | –/– |
- Source: Cricinfo, 20 November 2010

Mark John Lowrey (born 13 September 1971) is a former English cricketer. Lowrey was a right-handed batsman who bowled right-arm off break. He was born in Hampstead, London and later educated at Radley College and Cambridge University.

Lowrey made his first-class debut for Cambridge University against Northamptonshire in 1990. From 1990 to 1991, he represented the university in 20 first-class matches, the last of which came against Oxford University. In his 20 first-class matches for the university, he scored 597 runs at a batting average of 19.90, with 3 half centuries and a high score of 72. In the field he took 3 catches. With the ball he took 19 wickets at a bowling average of 51.52, with best figures of 3/31.

In 1999, he represented the Middlesex Cricket Board in a single List A match against Cumberland in the 1999 NatWest Trophy. In his only List A match, he scored 24 runs and with the ball he took a single wicket at a cost of 38 runs.
