= Martin Lewis (cricketer) =

English cricketer

Personal information
- Full name: John Martin Lewis
- Born: 29 September 1969 (age 57); Barrow-in-Furness, Lancashire, England
- Batting: Right-handed
- Bowling: Right-arm medium

Domestic team information
- Years: Team
- 1993–2002: Cumberland

Career statistics
Competition	List A
Matches	9
Runs scored	140
Batting average	17.50
100s/50s	–/1
Top score	65
Balls bowled	272
Wickets	8
Bowling average	22.75
5 wickets in innings	–
10 wickets in match	–
Best bowling	3/10
Catches/stumpings	2/–
- Source: Cricinfo, 5 February 2011

John Martin Lewis (born 29 September 1969) is a former English cricketer. Lewis was a right-handed batsman who bowled right-arm medium pace. He was born in Barrow-in-Furness, Lancashire.

In 1993 he made his debut for Cumberland in the Minor Counties Championship against Norfolk. From 1993 to 2002, Lewis represented Cumberland in 44 Championship matches, the last of which came against Bedfordshire. In the same season as his Championship debut, Lewis also made his MCCA Knockout Trophy debut against Cheshire. From 1993 to 2002, he represented Cumberland in 24 Trophy matches, the last of which came against the Durham Cricket Board.

1999 saw him make his debut in a List A cricket for Cumberland against Cornwall in the 1st round of the 1999 NatWest Trophy. From 1999 to 2002, he played 9 List A matches for Cumberland, the last of which came against Devon in the 2nd round of the 2003 Cheltenham & Gloucester Trophy which was played in 2002. In his 9 List A matches, he scored 140 runs at a batting average of 17.50, with a single half century high score of 65. With the ball he took 8 wickets at a bowling average of 22.75, with best figures of 3/10.
