= Tommy Wilson (umpire) =

English cricket umpire (1937–2023)

Thomas Guy Wilson (5 November 1937 – 29 March 2023) was an English cricket umpire from Bretherton, Lancashire.

Wilson first stood as an umpire in a Minor Counties Championship match between Shropshire and Cambridgeshire in 1969. Seven years later, he stood in his first first-class match between Yorkshire and Lancashire in the County Championship. In that same year, he stood in his first List A match between Yorkshire and Northamptonshire in the 1976 John Player League. In total, Wilson stood in 25 first-class matches from 1976 to 1986, and 35 List A matches from 1976 to 2002, standing in his final List A game in the 1st round of the 2003 Cheltenham & Gloucester Trophy between Buckinghamshire and Suffolk which was held in 2002. In addition, Wilson stood in 151 Minor Counties Championship matches from 1969 to 2004, as well as 36 MCCA Knockout Trophy matches from 1983 to 2002. Wilson also stood in 37 Second XI Championship matches from 1972 to 2000.

A biography, There's Only One Tommy Wilson by Douglas Miller, was published in 2015.
