= David Miller (English cricketer) =

English cricketer (born 1974)

Personal information
- Full name: David Richard Miller
- Born: 21 September 1974 (age 52); Poole, Dorset, England
- Batting: Right-handed
- Role: Occasional wicketkeeper

Domestic team information
- Years: Team
- 1998–2000: Dorset

Career statistics
Competition	List A
Matches	1
Runs scored	41
Batting average	41.00
100s/50s	0/0
Top score	41
Catches/stumpings	0/–
- Source: Cricinfo, 21 March 2010

David Richard Miller (born 21 September 1974) is an English former cricketer. Miller was a right-handed batsman who occasionally played as a wicketkeeper.

Miller made his debut for Dorset in the 1998 Minor Counties Championship against Herefordshire. From 1998 to 2000, Miller represented Dorset in 14 Minor Counties Championship matches, with his final appearance for the county coming against Wiltshire.

In 1999, Miller played his only List-A match for Dorset in the 1999 NatWest Trophy against Scotland, where he scored 41 runs.
