= Shaun Birbeck =

English cricketer

Shaun Birbeck (born 26 July 1972) is a former English cricketer. He was a left-handed batsman and a right-arm medium-pace bowler who played for Durham. Birbeck's first-class career began in 1994, having represented the team in the Second XI Championship the previous year.

Birbeck made his first-class debut in a university match in 1994, which Durham won by a comfortable margin following a considerable rain delay. He scored six runs from a grinding 46-ball spell, in mostly appalling weather conditions.

Birbeck made his County Championship debut just over a year later, playing for the first time in the 1995 tournament, in an innings defeat against Surrey which saw the opponents win by an innings margin thanks to centuries from Alec Stewart and Mark Butcher. Birbeck made three further appearances in the County Championship in the 1995 season, and while Durham finished second-bottom in the County Championship that season, Birbeck made just one further appearance in the competition, in the following season.

Birbeck appeared three times in the NatWest Trophy in each of the 1999 and 2000 seasons. In 2006, Birbeck made nineteen appearances for Hetton Lyons in the Northern Rock North East Premier League, his first cricketing appearances since the 2000 NatWest Trophy competition.

Birbeck was a lower-order batsman and an occasional bowler, with one half-century in both first-class and one-day cricket to his name.
