= Michael Smethurst =

English cricketer

Michael Paul Smethurst (born 11 October 1976) is an English former cricketer. He was a right-handed batsman and a right-arm medium-pace bowler who played for Lancashire between 1999 and 2002, having represented the Lancashire Second XI since 1996.

His first appearance in the Second XI championship came in June 1996. He made his breakthrough in first-class cricket in April 1999. He would appear regularly for the first team over the next three years. Smethurst represented Lancashire in the Second XI trophy and the AON Risks Trophy in 1999, 2001 and 2002. He retired from first-class cricket in 2002.

Smethurst is now Director of Cricket at Roedean School.
