= Roger Bradley =

Dutch cricketer

Personal information
- Full name: Roger Robert Andrew Francis Bradley
- Born: 30 November 1962; Wellington, New Zealand
- Died: 24 March 2017 (aged 54); Tauranga, New Zealand
- Batting: Right-handed

International information
- National side: Netherlands

Domestic team information
- Years: Team
- 1995–2001: Netherlands
- 1990/91: Northern Districts

Career statistics
Competition	First-class	List A
Matches	1	15
Runs scored	–	278
Batting average	–	19.85
100s/50s	–	0/2
Top score	–	78
Balls bowled	36	36
Wickets	1	0
Bowling average	31.00	–
5 wickets in innings	0	–
10 wickets in match	0	–
Best bowling	1/31	–
Catches/stumpings	0/–	7/–
- Source: Cricinfo, 5 February 2011

Roger Robert Andrew Francis Bradley (30 November 1962 – 24 March 2017) was a New Zealand-born Dutch cricketer. Bradley was a right-handed batsman.

Born in the New Zealand capital, Wellington, Bradley attended Otumoetai College in Tauranga. He played a single first-class match for Northern Districts in the 1990/91 New Zealand cricket season against Central Districts. By 1995, he had moved to the Netherlands and in June of that year he made his debut for the Netherlands in the 1995 NatWest Trophy against Northamptonshire. Over the next seven years he played 15 List A matches for the Netherlands, competing in the English domestic one-day tournament, the 2000 ICC Emerging Nations Tournament and the 2002 ICC 6 Nations Challenge. In his 15 List A matches for his adopted country, Bradley scored 278 runs at a batting average of 19.85, with two half centuries. His highest score was 78 against Cambridgeshire in 1999, when he won the player of the match award.

He also represented the Netherlands in ten matches in the 2001 ICC Trophy.

Bradley died in Tauranga on 24 March 2017 after a long illness.
