= Richard Skyrme =

English cricketer

Personal information
- Full name: Richard Philip Skyrme
- Born: 23 December 1960 (age 65); Hereford, Herefordshire, England
- Batting: Right-handed
- Bowling: Right-arm off break

Domestic team information
- Years: Team
- 1992–1998: Herefordshire

Career statistics
Competition	List A
Matches	2
Runs scored	17
Batting average	8.50
100s/50s	0/0
Top score	10
Balls bowled	72
Wickets	2
Bowling average	39.00
5 wickets in innings	0
10 wickets in match	–
Best bowling	2/78
Catches/stumpings	3/–
- Source: Cricinfo, 27 November 2010

Richard Philip Skyrme (born 23 December 1960) is a former English cricketer. Skyrme was a right-handed batsman who bowled right-arm off break. He was born in Hereford, Herefordshire.

Having played for Herefordshire before their admission to Minor counties cricket since 1983, Skyrme later made his debut for the county in their first Minor Counties Championship match against Wales Minor Counties in 1992. From 1992 to 1998, he represented the county in 30 Championship matches, the last of which came against Oxfordshire. His MCCA Knockout Trophy debut for the county came against Shropshire in 1992. From 1992 to 1997, he represented the county in 12 Trophy matches, the last of which came against Shropshire.

He also represented Herefordshire in two List A matches against Durham in the 1995 NatWest Trophy and Somerset in the 1997 NatWest Trophy. In his two matches, he scored 17 runs at a batting average of 8.50, with a high score of 10. In the field he took 3 catches. With the ball he took 2 wickets at a bowling average of 39.00, with best figures of 2/78.

He was until recently he was Head of Sport at Hereford Cathedral School
