= 1998 NatWest Trophy =

- Administrator: England and Wales Cricket Board
- Cricket format: Limited overs cricket (60 overs per innings)
- Tournament format: Knockout
- Champions: Lancashire (7th title)
- Participants: 32
- Matches: 31
- Most runs: 218 Justin Langer (Middlesex)
- Most wickets: 15 Peter Martin (Lancashire)

The 1998 NatWest Trophy was the 18th NatWest Trophy. It was an English limited overs county cricket tournament which was held between 24 June and 5 September 1998. The tournament was won by Lancashire County Cricket Club who defeated Derbyshire County Cricket Club by 9 wickets in the final at Lord's. This was the final version of the tournament to be played with 60 overs per side.

== Format ==
The 18 first-class counties, were joined by eleven Minor Counties: Bedfordshire, Buckinghamshire, Cambridgeshire, Cheshire, Cumberland, Devon, Dorset, Herefordshire, Norfolk, Staffordshire and Wales Minor Counties. The Ireland national cricket team, Scotland national cricket team and the Netherlands national cricket team also participated. Teams who won in the first round progressed to the second round. The winners in the second round then progressed to the quarter-final stage. Winners from the quarter-finals then progressed to the semi-finals from which the winners then went on to the final at Lord's which was held on 5 September 1998. The opening round of fixtures saw Scotland beat Worcestershire.

=== First round ===
24 June 1998
(scorecard)

Cheshire; 92 all out (36.5 overs)	v	Essex; 96/0 (24.5 overs)
Stuart Stoneman 12*; Ronnie Irani 3/13 (10 overs)		Paul Prichard 55*

Essex won by 10 wickets
Boughton Hall Cricket Club Ground, Chester
Umpires: Jack Bond & Ray Julian
Player of the match: Ronnie Irani (Essex)

24 June 1998
(scorecard)

Derbyshire; 266/5 (60 overs)	v	Cumberland; 202 all out (56.4 overs)
Matthew Cassar 90*; David Pennett 2/44 (12 overs)		Simon Dutton 68*; Dominic Cork 4/46 (12 overs)

Derbyshire won by 64 runs
County Ground, Derby
Umpires: Chris Balderstone & Martin Reed
Player of the match: Matthew Cassar (Derbyshire)

24 June 1998
(scorecard)

Devon; 80 all out (28.3 overs)	v	Yorkshire; 81/1 (20.2 overs)
Peter Roebuck 22; Ryan Sidebottom 3/15 (4 overs)		Michael Vaughan 38*; Stuart MacGill 1/29 (8 overs)

Yorkshire won by 9 wickets
The Maer Ground, Exmouth
Umpires: Neil Mallender & Roy Palmer
Player of the match: Paul Hutchison (Yorkshire)

24, 25 June 1998
(scorecard)

Hampshire; 315/5 (60 overs)	v	Dorset; 154 all out (45.3 overs)
Robin Smith 144*; Steve Forshaw 2/59 (9 overs)		Jon Hardy 45; Shaun Udal 4/20 (8.3 overs)

Hampshire won by 161 runs
Dean Park Cricket Ground, Bournemouth
Umpires: John Harris & Kevin Lyons
Player of the match: Robin Smith (Hampshire)

- Match was scheduled for one day but extended to two.

24, 25 June 1998
(scorecard)

Glamorgan; 373/7 (60 overs)	v	Bedfordshire; 225 all out (54.3 overs)
Adrian Dale 89; John Hughes 2/60 (10 overs)		Zaheer Sher 47*; Waqar Younis 4/46 (12 overs)

Glamorgan won by 148 runs
Sophia Gardens, Cardiff
Umpires: Mervyn Kitchen & Alan Whitehead
Player of the match: Adrian Dale (Glamorgan)

- Match was scheduled for one day but extended to two.

24, 25 June 1998
(scorecard)

Gloucestershire; 266/8 (60 overs)	v	Northamptonshire; 246 all out (57.5 overs)
Tim Hancock 60; Franklyn Rose 3/43 (12 overs)		Kevin Curran 53; Tim Hancock 3/30 (6 overs)

Gloucestershire won by 20 runs
The Royal & Sun Alliance County Ground, Bristol
Umpires: Tony Clarkson & George Sharp
Player of the match: Tim Hancock (Gloucestershire)

- Match was scheduled for one day but extended to two.

24 June 1998
(scorecard)

Cambridgeshire; 153/9 (60 overs)	v	Kent; 154/2 (37.2 overs)
Nadeem Mohammed 35; Ben Phillips 3/14 (7 overs)		Trevor Ward 61*; Dominic Ralfs 1/26 (9 overs)

Kent won by 8 wickets
St Lawrence Ground, Canterbury
Umpires: Paul Adams & Barry Dudleston
Player of the match: Ben Phillips (Kent)

24, 25 June 1998
(scorecard)

Lancashire; 210 all out (51.3 overs)	v	Sussex; 162 all out (54.5 overs)
Mike Atherton 53; Jason Lewry 4/42 (12 overs)		Mark Newell 63*; Peter Martin 5/30 (11.5 overs)

Lancashire won by 48 runs
Old Trafford, Manchester
Umpires: Pasty Harris & Ken Palmer
Player of the match: Peter Martin (Lancashire)

- Match was scheduled for one day but extended to two.

24 June 1998
(scorecard)

Staffordshire; 189 all out (59.4 overs)	v	Leicestershire; 192/4 (37.5 overs)
Richard Harvey 32; Chris Lewis 5/19 (9.4 overs)		Phil Simmons 107*; Laurie Potter 2/20 (9 overs)

Leicestershire won by 6 wickets
Grace Road, Leicester
Umpires: John Hampshire & Nigel Plews
Player of the match: Phil Simmons (Leicestershire)

24 June 1998
(scorecard)

Herefordshire; 213/8 (60 overs)	v	Middlesex; 215/3 (45.4 overs)
Robert Hall 53 (73); Mark Ramprakash 2/24 (7 overs)		Justin Langer 114* (136); Neal Radford 1/24 (7 overs)

Middlesex won by 7 wickets
Lord's, London
Umpires: Mark Benson & Vanburn Holder
Player of the match: Justin Langer (Middlesex)

24 June 1998
(scorecard)

Norfolk; 198/8 (60 overs)	v	Durham; 199/2 (54.1 overs)
David Thomas 59 (128); Nick Phillips 2/16 (12 overs)		David Boon 80* (110); Paul Bradshaw 1/19 (9 overs)

Durham won by 8 wickets
County Ground, Norwich
Umpires: Barrie Leadbeater & Jeremy Lloyds
Player of the match: Nick Phillips (Durham)

24 June 1998
(scorecard)

Netherlands; 117 all out (49.2 overs)	v	Somerset; 120/0 (17.4 overs)
Roger Bradley 31; Mushtaq Ahmed 5/26 (12 overs)		Mike Burns 84*

Somerset won by 10 wickets
County Ground, Taunton
Umpires: John Holder & David Shepherd
Player of the match: Mushtaq Ahmed (Somerset)

24 June 1998
(scorecard)

Surrey; 315/9 (60 overs)	v	Buckinghamshire; 183 all out (43.3 overs)
Alec Stewart 97; Tim Scriven 3/61 (12 overs)		Mike Rindel 46; Alex Tudor 4/39 (10.3 overs)

Surrey won by 132 runs
The Oval, London
Umpires: Allan Jones & John Steele
Player of the match: Alec Stewart (Surrey)

24, 25 June 1998
(scorecard)

Nottinghamshire; 258/7 (60 overs)	v	Wales Minor Counties; 169/9 (60 overs)
Jason Gallian 63; Steve Barwick 2/45 (12 overs)		Stefan Jenkins 44; Chris Tolley 2/16 (8 overs)

Nottinghamshire won by 89 runs
Penrhyn Avenue, Rhos-on-Sea
Umpires: Dickie Bird & Ken Shuttleworth
Player of the match: Jason Gallian (Nottinghamshire)

- Match was scheduled for one day but extended to two.

24, 25 June 1998
(scorecard)

Warwickshire; 302/5 (60 overs)	v	Ireland; 261/8 (60 overs)
Nick Knight 143*; Peter Gillespie 2/27 (12 overs)		Ed Joyce 73; Ashley Giles 4/29 (12 overs)

Warwickshire won by 41 runs
Edgbaston, Birmingham
Umpires: David Constant & Bob White
Player of the match: Nick Knight (Warwickshire)

- Match was scheduled for one day but extended to two.

24 June 1998
(scorecard)

Scotland; 244/6 (60 overs)	v	Worcestershire; 240/9 (60 overs)
Bruce Patterson 71; Stuart Lampitt 2/44 (12 overs)		Gavin Haynes 74; Craig Wright 5/23 (12 overs)

Scotland won by 4 runs
The Grange, Edinburgh
Umpires: Phil Carrick & Trevor Jesty
Player of the match: Craig Wright (Scotland)

=== Second round ===
8 July 1998
(scorecard)

Glamorgan; 188 all out (59 overs)	v	Leicestershire; 189/5 (55.2 overs)
Matthew Maynard 66; Dominic Williamson 5/37 (11 overs)		Aftab Habib 67; Steve Watkin 3/25 (12 overs)

Leicestershire won by 5 wickets
Sophia Gardens, Cardiff
Umpires: Tony Clarkson & John Harris
Player of the match: Vince Wells (Leicestershire)

8 July 1998
(scorecard)

Surrey; 215 all out (59.1 overs)	v	Gloucestershire; 163 all out (55 overs)
Alec Stewart 89; Mike Smith 4/46 (12 overs)		Jack Russell 49*; Martin Bicknell 3/24 (10 overs)

Surrey won by 52 runs
The Royal & Sun Alliance County Ground, Bristol
Umpires: Ray Julian & Nigel Plews
Player of the match: Adam Hollioake (Surrey)

8 July 1998
(scorecard)

Essex; 129 all out (41.4 overs)	v	Hampshire; 132/7 (41.1 overs)
Danny Law 47; Cardigan Connor 4/13 (8 overs)		Kevan James 24; Ronnie Irani 4/41 (12 overs)

Hampshire won by 3 wickets
County Ground, Southampton
Umpires: David Constant & Mervyn Kitchen
Player of the match: Cardigan Connor (Hampshire)

8 July 1998
(scorecard)

Yorkshire; 178/9 (60 overs)	v	Lancashire; 179/7 (57 overs)
Darren Gough 42; Wasim Akram 3/50 (12 overs)		Neil Fairbrother 76*; Darren Gough 4/50 (12 overs)

Lancashire won by 3 wickets
Old Trafford, Manchester
Umpires: Bob White & Alan Whitehead
Player of the match: Neil Fairbrother (Lancashire)

8 July 1998
(scorecard)

Durham; 240/8 (60 overs)	v	Middlesex; 244/8 (58.4 overs)
Nick Speak 73 (145); Richard Johnson 2/38 (12 overs)		Keith Dutch 49 (53); Martin Saggers 2/42 (9.4 overs)

Middlesex won by 2 wickets
John Walker's Ground, Southgate
Umpires: Ken Palmer & David Shepherd
Player of the match: Richard Johnson (Middlesex)

8 July 1998
(scorecard)

Somerset; 255/9 (60 overs)	v	Nottinghamshire; 256/9 (59.3 overs)
Richard Harden 61; Paul Franks 3/40 (9 overs)		Chris Tolley 77; Andy Caddick 4/63 (12 overs)

Nottinghamshire won by 1 wicket
Trent Bridge, Nottingham
Umpires: Graham Burgess & Barry Dudleston
Player of the match: Chris Tolley (Surrey)

8 July 1998
(scorecard)

Warwickshire; 303/6 (60 overs)	v	Kent; 136 all out (42.1 overs)
Brian Lara 133; Dean Headley 2/48 (12 overs)		Carl Hooper 38; Graeme Welch 4/31 (12 overs)

Warwickshire won by 167 runs
Edgbaston, Birmingham
Umpires: Chris Balderstone & Roy Palmer
Player of the match: Brian Lara (Warwickshire)

8 July 1998
(scorecard)

Scotland; 113 all out (52.4 overs)	v	Derbyshire; 114/3 (39.2 overs)
Ian Stanger 44; Kevin Dean 3/13 (10 overs)		Kim Barnett 49; Asim Butt 1/18 (10 overs)

Derbyshire won by 7 wickets
The Grange, Edinburgh
Umpires: John Hampshire & Barrie Leadbeater
Player of the match: Kevin Dean (Derbyshire)

=== Quarter-finals ===
28 July 1998
(scorecard)

Nottinghamshire; 249/9 (60 overs)	v	Lancashire; 255/4 (55.2 overs)
Jason Gallian 83; Glen Chapple 5/57 (12 overs)		Mike Atherton 76; Paul Strang 1/34 (12 overs)

Lancashire won by 6 wickets
Old Trafford Cricket Ground, Manchester
Umpires: Dickie Bird & Graham Burgess
Player of the match: Mike Atherton (Lancashire)

28 July 1998
(scorecard)

Warwickshire; 98 all out (36 overs)	v	Leicestershire; 101/2 (36.2 overs)
Graeme Welch 25 (61); Alan Mullally 5/18 (12 overs)		Iain Sutcliffe 39* (102); Ed Giddins 4/19 (9 overs)

Leicestershire won by 8 wickets
Grace Road, Leicester
Umpires: Trevor Jesty & Jeremy Lloyds
Player of the match: Alan Mullally (Leicestershire)

28 July 1998
(scorecard)

Hampshire; 295/5 (60 overs)	v	Middlesex; 151 all out (42.4 overs)
Adrian Aymes 73*; Angus Fraser 1/25 (12 overs)		Justin Langer 57; Shaun Udal 2/11 (5 overs)

Hampshire won by 144 runs
Lord's, London
Umpires: Allan Jones & Peter Willey
Player of the match: Adrian Aymes (Hampshire)

28 July 1998
(scorecard)

Surrey; 217/7 (60 overs)	v	Derbyshire; 218/5 (58.2 overs)
Martin Bicknell 48*; Kevin Dean 2/38 (12 overs)		Michael Slater 82; Ian Salisbury 1/30 (10.5 overs)

Derbyshire won by 5 wickets
The Oval, London
Umpires: Vanburn Holder & John Steele
Player of the match: Kim Barnett (Derbyshire)

=== Semi-finals ===
11 August 1998
(scorecard)

Lancashire; 252 all out (60 overs)	v	Hampshire; 209/9 (60 overs)
John Crawley 79 (140); Dimitri Mascarenhas 3/28 (8 overs)		Dimitri Mascarenhas 73 (125); Ian Austin 3/25 (12 overs)

Lancashire won by 43 runs
County Ground, Southampton
Umpires: Chris Balderstone & John Holder
Player of the match: Dimitri Mascarenhas (Hampshire)

12 August 1998
(scorecard)

Derbyshire; 298/7 (60 overs)	v	Leicestershire; 295/6 (60 overs)
Dominic Cork 61* (62); Darren Maddy 1/18 (2 overs)		Phil Simmons 90 (99); Kevin Dean 2/63 (12 overs)

Derbyshire won by 3 runs
Grace Road, Leicester
Umpires: Nigel Plews & David Shepherd
Player of the match: Dominic Cork (Derbyshire)

=== Final ===
5, 6 September 1998
(scorecard)

Derbyshire; 108 all out (36.4 overs)	v	Lancashire; 109/1 (30.2 overs)
Michael Slater 34 (62); Peter Martin 4/19 (9 overs)		John Crawley 53* (93); Dominic Cork 1/24 (10.2 overs)

Lancashire won by 9 wickets
Lord's, London
Umpires: Ken Palmer & George Sharp
Player of the match: Ian Austin (Lancashire)

- Match was scheduled for one day but extended to two.
