= List of Middlesex Cricket Board List A players =

Middlesex Cricket Board played in List A cricket matches between 1999 and 2002. This is a list of the players who appeared in those matches.

- Richard Barlow (2001): RGR Barlow
- Ian Boyton (2001): IJ Boyton
- Christopher Coleman (2002): CP Coleman
- Mark Crawley (1999): MA Crawley
- Matthew Creese (2001–2002): ML Creese
- Paul Dancy (2001): PAJ Dancy
- Ricky Fay (2000): RA Fay
- Alastair Fraser (1999–2002): AGJ Fraser
- Chris Goldie (2001): CFE Goldie
- Tom Harrison (1999–2000): TW Harrison
- Vernon Hill (2001): EV Hill
- Craig Jones (2002): CMP Jones
- Robin Jones (1999–2000): RO Jones
- Mark Lowrey (1999): MJ Lowrey
- Kervin Marc (2000): K Marc
- John Maunders (2001): JK Maunders
- Brad McNamara (1999): BE McNamara
- Nadeem Mohammed (1999): N Mohammed
- Robert Nelson (2000–2002): RD Nelson
- Luke O'Reilly (2001): LJ O'Reilly
- Chetan Patel (1999): CM Patel
- Sachin Patel (2002): S Patel
- Chris Peploe (2001): CT Peploe
- Kirk Powell (2001–2002): KHA Powell
- Stephen Price (2001–2002): SJ Price
- Keerthi Ranasinghe (2000–2002): SK Ranasinghe
- Rajesh Rao (2000–2002): RK Rao
- Carlos Remy (2000–2001): CC Remy
- James Rodham (2002): JP Rodham
- Neil Sargeant (2000): NF Sargeant
- Ben Scott (1999): BJM Scott
- Tom Simpson (2000): TA Simpson
- Paul Smith (2002): PC Smith
- Luke Stoughton (20010: LRF Stoughton
- Chris Tetley (2001): CMB Tetley
- Simon Weale (1999): SD Weale
- Peter Wellings (2001–2002): PE Wellings
- Mark Wright (2001): MJW Wright
- David Young (2002): DJ Young
