= 2003 Cheltenham & Gloucester Trophy =

- Administrator: England and Wales Cricket Board
- Cricket format: Limited overs cricket (50 overs)
- Tournament format: Knockout
- Champions: Gloucestershire (4th title)
- Participants: 54
- Matches: 57
- Most runs: Vikram Solanki 270 (for Worcestershire)
- Most wickets: Andrew Clarke 11 (for Buckinghamshire)

The 2003 Cheltenham & Gloucester Trophy was an English county cricket tournament, held between 29 August 2002 and 30 August 2003. The competition was won by Gloucestershire who beat Worcestershire by 7 wickets at Lord's.

== Format ==
The eighteen first-class counties were joined in the tournament by 20 Minor Counties (Bedfordshire, Berkshire, Buckinghamshire, Cambridgeshire, Cheshire, Cornwall, Cumberland, Devon, Dorset, Herefordshire, Hertfordshire, Lincolnshire, Norfolk, Northumberland, Oxfordshire, Shropshire, Staffordshire, Suffolk, Wales Minor Counties and Wiltshire), as well as Huntingdonshire. The cricket boards of Durham, Derbyshire, Essex, Gloucestershire, Hampshire, Kent, Lancashire, Leicestershire, Middlesex, Northamptonshire, Nottinghamshire, Somerset, Surrey, Sussex, Warwickshire, Worcestershire and Yorkshire also took part, as did the national teams of Denmark, Ireland, the Netherlands and Scotland.

The tournament was a knockout with four rounds before the quarter-final and semi-final stages. The first and second rounds, which did not involve the first-class counties, were played in August and September 2002. The winners of the semi-finals went on to the final at Lord's which was held on 30 August 2003.

== Fixtures ==
=== First round ===
29 August 2002
(scorecard)

Hertfordshire; 167 all out (45.4 overs)	v	Bedfordshire; 169/2 (26.1 overs)
Steve Cordingley 58; Robert Pack 3/20 (10 overs)		David Clarke 73*; Kervin Marc 1/42 (8 overs)

Bedfordshire won by 8 wickets
Wardown Park, Luton
Umpires: Alan Price & Charlie Puckett
Player of the match: Robert Pack

29 August 2002
(scorecard)

Ireland; 113 all out (35 overs)	v	Berkshire; 114/6 (27 overs)
Gary Neely 17* (26); Tyron Henderson 7/30 (9 overs)		Paul Prichard 51* (65); Gary Neely 3/40 (9 overs)

Berkshire won by 4 wickets
Memorial Ground, Finchampstead
Umpires: Alan Bundy & John Ilott
Player of the match: Paul Prichard

29 August 2002
(scorecard)

Buckinghamshire; 424/5 (50 overs)	v	Suffolk; 194 all out (40 overs)
David Taylor 140; Kevin Shaw 2/79 (10 overs)		Russell Catley 65; Andrew Clarke 5/36 (9 overs)

Buckinghamshire won by 230 runs
Dinton Cricket Club Ground, Dinton
Umpires: Keith Coburn & Tommy Wilson
Player of the match: David Taylor

29 August 2002
(scorecard)

Cheshire; 230/5 (50 overs)	v	Huntingdonshire; 218 all out (49 overs)
Eric Upashantha 59 * (36); Pieter Strydom 2/22 (10 overs)		Pieter Strydom 37 (37); Richard Hignett 3/21 (6 overs)

Cheshire won by 12 runs
Booth Park, Knutsford
Umpires: Hugh Evans & David Tate
Player of the match: Eric Upashantha

29, 30 August 2002
(scorecard)

Cornwall; 301/8 (50 overs)	v	Somerset Cricket Board; 299 all out (50 overs)
Jonathan Kent 80; Michael Parsons 3/70 (10 overs)		Arul Suppiah 70; Justin Stephens 3/54 (10 overs)

Cornwall won by 2 runs
Roskear, Camborne
Umpires: Guy Randall-Johnson & Gordon Ripley
Player of the match: Jonathan Kent

- Match extended to 2 days

29 August 2002
(scorecard)

Cumberland; 280/5 (50 overs)	v	Nottinghamshire Cricket Board; 194 all out (50 overs)
Steven Knox 108*; Mark Tournier 2/33 (10 overs)		Zahid Iqbal 56*; Ian Austin 4/25 (10 overs)

Cumberland won by 86 runs
Fitz Park, Keswick
Umpires: Charles McNamee & Kenneth Shenton
Player of the match: Steven Knox

29 August 2002
(scorecard)

Surrey Cricket Board; 290/4 (50 overs)	v	Gloucestershire Cricket Board; 273/8 (50 overs)
Sairaj Bahutule 105; Jonathan White 3/32 (10 overs)		Mark Coombes 97; Joe Porter 4/51 (10 overs)

Surrey Cricket Board won by 17 runs
County Ground, Bristol
Umpires: Stephen Kuhlmann & Michael Moran
Player of the match: Sairaj Bahutule

29 August 2002
(scorecard)

Hampshire Cricket Board; 280/6 (50 overs)	v	Wiltshire; 196 all out (41.4 overs)
Damian Shirazi 101 (142); James Hibberd 4/48 (10 overs)		Baqar Rizvi 27 (18); Roger Miller 3/26 (8 overs)

Hampshire Cricket Board won by 84 runs
The Quarters, Hursley Park, Winchester
Umpires: Stephen Bishopp & Stephen Marszal
Player of the match: Damian Shirazi

29 August 2002
(scorecard)

Denmark; 249/6 (50 overs)	v	Leicestershire Cricket Board; 253/6 (46.1 overs)
Aftab Ahmed 77 (61); Neil Pullen 4/36 (10 overs)		Michael Sutliff 97 (109); Lars Hedegaard Andersen 2/21 (7 overs)

Leicestershire Cricket Board won by 4 wickets
Ratcliffe College, Cossington
Umpires: Peter Clubb & Cliff Pocock
Player of the match: Neil Pullen

29 August 2002
(scorecard)

Middlesex Cricket Board; 239/9 (50 overs)	v	Derbyshire Cricket Board; 201 all out (47.5 overs)
Peter Wellings 59; Naeem Akhtar 3/40 (10 overs)		Jonny Owen 48; James Rodham 4/23 (8 overs)

Middlesex Cricket Board won by 38 runs
John Walker's Ground, Southgate
Umpires: John Reed & Bob Sutton
Player of the match: Kirk Powell

29 August 2002
(scorecard)

Yorkshire Cricket Board; 233/8 (50 overs)	v	Northamptonshire Cricket Board; 176 all out (43.2 overs)
Simon Widdup 90; David Capel 3/35 (10 overs)		Thomas Baker (cricketer) 63; Steven Patterson 3/11 (7.2 overs)

Yorkshire Cricket Board won by 57 runs
County Ground, Northampton, Northampton
Umpires: Robert Eagleton & John Tythcott
Player of the match: Simon Widdup

29 August 2002
(scorecard)

Lancashire Cricket Board; 229/8 (50 overs)	v	Oxfordshire; 198 all out (48.2 overs)
Stephen Dearden 67 (62); Adam Cook 3/40 (10 overs)		Stewart Laudat 39 (44); Andrew Mercer 4/26 (10 overs)

Lancashire Cricket Board won by 31 runs
Banbury Cricket Club Ground, Bodicote
Umpires: David Burden & Ross Wood
Player of the match: Stephen Dearden

29 August 2002
(scorecard)

Herefordshire; 276/6 (50 overs)	v	Warwickshire Cricket Board; 203 all out (47.5 overs)
Paul Lazenbury 71 (110); Daniel Dalton 2/40 (9 overs)		Daniel Dalton 46 (67); Naved-ul-Hasan 4/49 (8.5 overs)

Herefordshire won by 73 runs
Bulls Head Ground, Coventry
Umpires: Bill Smith & John Wilkinson
Player of the match: Paul Lazenbury

29 August 2002
(scorecard)

Dorset; 227 all out (49.4 overs)	v	Worcestershire Cricket Board; 228/5 (46 overs)
Glyn Treagus 76 (109); Imran Jamshed 5/29 (10 overs)		David Manning 80 (47); Joseph Wilson 2/36 (8 overs)

Worcestershire Cricket Board won by 5 wickets
Chester Road, Kidderminster
Umpires: Steve Johnson & Wyn Morgan
Player of the match: David Manning

=== Second round ===
12 September 2002
(scorecard)

Netherlands; 96 all out (34.4 overs)	v	Bedfordshire; 97/0 (15.3 overs)
Darron Reekers 14; Shaun Rashid 4/30 (10 overs)		Neil Stanley 56

Bedfordshire won by 10 wickets
Wardown Park, Luton
Umpires: Robert Eagleton & John Tythcott
Player of the match: Shaun Rashid

12 September 2002
(scorecard)

Norfolk; 119 all out (40.5 overs)	v	Berkshire; 123/4 (27.1 overs)
Steve Goldsmith 35 (32); Simon Myles 4/8 (10 overs)		Paul Prichard 45 (41); Paul Taylor 2/28 (6.1 overs)

Berkshire won by 6 wickets
Sonning Lane, Reading
Umpires: Stephen Bishopp & Alan Bundy
Player of the match: Simon Myles

12 September 2002
(scorecard)

Buckinghamshire; 160 all out (49.5 overs)	v	Shropshire; 123/4 (27.1 overs)
Paul Atkins 38; Ben Platt 2/15 (10 overs)		Bryan Jones 27; Andrew Clarke 4/28 (10 overs)

Buckinghamshire won by 11 runs
Wilton Park, Beaconsfield
Umpires: John Ilott & Alan Price
Player of the match: Jeremy Batty

12 September 2002
(scorecard)

Lincolnshire; 281/7 (50 overs)	v	Cheshire; 277/8 (50 overs)
Martyn Dobson 90 (119); Stewart Eaton 2/52 (10 overs)		Mark Currie 94 (136); Mark Fell 4/20 (5 overs)

Lincolnshire won by 4 runs
Parkgate Cricket Ground, Parkgate
Umpires: Les Freeman & Jack Hemstock
Player of the match: Richard Hignett

12 September 2002
(scorecard)

Devon; 285/6 (50 overs)	v	Cumberland; 158 all out (43.5 overs)
Robert Dawson 138; Asim Munir 2/72 (10 overs)		David Pennett 51*; Mark Richards 4/22 (10 overs)

Devon won by 127 runs
The Maer Ground, Exmouth
Umpires: Peter Kingston-Davey & Stephen Kuhlmann
Player of the match: Bob Dawson

12 September 2002
(scorecard)

Durham Cricket Board; 274/8 (50 overs)	v	Herefordshire; 224 all out (47.2 overs)
Gary Scott 100 (65); Nicholas Davies 4/72 (10 overs)		Christopher Boroughs 72 (101); Stephen Humble 3/33 (7 overs)

Durham Cricket Board won by 50 runs
Feethams, Darlington
Umpires: Charles McNamee & Andrew Wood
Player of the match: Gary Scott

12 September 2002
(scorecard)

Essex Cricket Board; 302/8 (50 overs)	v	Surrey Cricket Board; 253 all out (45.5 overs)
Saad Janjua 91; David Gorrod 3/37 (10 overs)		John Fry 69; Tauseef Ali 4/66 (9 overs)

Essex Cricket Board won by 49 runs
County Ground, Chelmsford
Umpires: Paul Joy & Stephen Marszal
Player of the match: Saad Janjua

12 September 2002
(scorecard)

Staffordshire; 249/6 (50 overs)	v	Hampshire Cricket Board; 144 all out (36.4 overs)
Gavin Franklin 63 (111); Richard Dibden 2/40 (10 overs)		Iain Brunnschweiler 37 (52); Mike Rindel 4/21 (8.4 overs)

Staffordshire won by 105 runs
The Quarters, Hursley Park, Winchester
Umpires: Gordon Ripley & Ross Wood
Player of the match: Graeme Archer

12 September 2002
(scorecard)

Leicestershire Cricket Board; 175 all (47.4 overs)	v	Kent Cricket Board; 176/3 (40.4 overs)
Craig Crowe 35; Andy Tutt 2/21 (10 overs)		John Bowden 38; Neil Pullen 1/35 (10 overs)

Kent Cricket Board won by 7 wickets
Mote Park, Maidstone
Umpires: Ron Dowd & Bob Sutton
Player of the match: Andy Tutt

12 September 2002
(scorecard)

Middlesex Cricket Board; 194 all out (44 overs)	v	Cambridgeshire; 200/3 (44.3 overs)
Keerthi Ranasinghe 75; Timothy Smith 3/35 (10 overs)		Simon Kellett 79; Peter Wellings 2/19 (6 overs)

Cambridgeshire won by 7 wickets
John Walker's Ground, Southgate
Umpires: Willem Molenaar & Cliff Pocock
Player of the match: Simon Kellett

12 September 2002
(scorecard)

Northumberland; 352 all out (49.4 overs)	v	Yorkshire Cricket Board; 226 all out (47.1 overs)
Bradley Parker 108; Neil Gill 3/62 (9.4 overs)		Simon Widdup 46; Lee Crozier 3/44 (10 overs)

Northumberland won by 126 runs
Osborne Avenue, Jesmond
Umpires: Peter Brown & Bjarne Jensen
Player of the match: Bradley Parker

12 September 2002
(scorecard)

Cornwall; 248/7 (50 overs)	v	Wales Minor Counties; 224 all out (48.2 overs)
James Hands 61; David Towse 2/28 (10 overs)		Phil Simmons 59; James Hands 3/40 (10 overs)

Cornwall won by 24 runs
Sully Centurions Cricket Club Ground, Sully
Umpires: John James & Guy Randall-Johnson
Player of the match: James Hands

12 September 2002
(scorecard)

Sussex Cricket Board; 225 all out (48.5 overs)	v	Worcestershire Cricket Board; 227/4 (43.5 overs)
Christopher Mole 66; Simon Cook 3/35 (10 overs)		Kadeer Ali 66; Jason Finch 1/22 (10 overs)

Worcestershire Cricket Board won by 6 wickets
Chester Road, Kidderminster
Umpires: David Burden & Steve Johnson
Player of the match: Imran Jamshed

12, 13 September 2002
(scorecard)

Scotland; 177/7 (42.4 overs)	v	Lancashire Cricket Board; 175/7 (50 overs)

Scotland won by 3 wickets
Aberdeen
Umpires: Colin Megennis, Trevor Henry
Player of the match: Stephen Dearden

- Match extended to two days

=== Third round ===
7 May 2003
(scorecard)

Warwickshire; 233/8 (50 overs)	v	Bedfordshire; 218/9 (50 overs)
Tony Frost 47 (76); William Sneath 4/38 (10 overs)		Timothy Roberts 48 (54); Mohamed Sheikh 3/41 (10 overs)

Warwickshire won by 15 runs
Wardown Park, Luton
Umpires: Vanburn Holder & Mervyn Kitchen
Player of the match: William Sneath

7 May 2003
(scorecard)

Berkshire; 110 all out (44.2 overs)	v	Durham; 111/2 (23 overs)
Julian Wood 18 (32); Vince Wells 6/20 (9 overs)		Vince Wells 63 (61); Tom Lambert 1/11 (3 overs)

Durham won by 8 wickets
Sonning Lane, Reading
Umpires: John Holder & Richard Kettleborough
Player of the match: Vince Wells

7 May 2003
(scorecard)

Gloucestershire; 401/7 (50 overs)	v	Buckinghamshire; 77 all out (25.1 overs)
Tim Hancock 135 (118); Andrew Clarke 2/78 (10 overs)		Paul Sawyer 26 (33); James Averis 6/23 (7 overs)

Gloucestershire won by 324 runs
Ascott Park, Wing
Umpires: Rob Bailey & Roy Palmer
Player of the match: Tim Hancock

7 May 2003
(scorecard)

Yorkshire; 299/5 (50 overs)	v	Cambridgeshire; 214/8 (50 overs)
Matthew Wood 118* (129); Ajaz Akhtar 3/53 (10 overs)		Nigel Gadsby 53 (81); Andy Gray 3/37 (10 overs)

Yorkshire won by 85 runs
The Avenue Sports Club Ground, March
Umpires: Steve Garratt & Jeremy Lloyds
Player of the match: Matthew Wood

7 May 2003
(scorecard)

Cornwall; 140 all out (46.1 overs)	v	Kent; 141/5 (38.4 overs)
Chris Hunkin 30 (36); Ben Trott 3/16 (10 overs)		Geraint Jones 30* (33); Chris Hunkin 2/24 (10 overs)

Kent won by 5 wickets
Boscawen Park, Truro
Umpires: Alan Hill & Alan Whitehead
Player of the match: Chris Hunkin

7 May 2003
(scorecard)

Devon; 180 all out (49.1 overs)	v	Lancashire; 182/1 (40.4 overs)
Neil Hancock 73 (82); John Wood 4/33 (8.1 overs)		Iain Sutcliffe 89* (127); Arul Suppiah 1/24 (7 overs)

Lancashire won by 9 wickets
The Maer Ground, Exmouth
Umpires: Richard Illingworth & George Sharp
Player of the match: Neil Hancock

7 May 2003
(scorecard)

Glamorgan; 312/9 (50 overs)	v	Durham Cricket Board; 226 all out (47.4 overs)
Matthew Maynard 115 (86); Liam Plunkett 3/63 (10 overs)		Allan Worthy 59 (70); Robert Croft 3/54 (10 overs)

Glamorgan won by 86 runs
Feethams, Darlington
Umpires: Barrie Leadbeater & Tim Robinson
Player of the match: Matthew Maynard

7 May 2003
(scorecard)

Essex; 315/6 (50 overs)	v	Essex Cricket Board; 273 all out (49.3 overs)
Will Jefferson 132 (141); Mohammad Akhtar 2/46 (10 overs)		Mohammad Akhtar 71 (62); Graham Napier 3/47 (8.3 overs)

Essex won by 42 runs
County Ground, Chelmsford
Umpires: Nigel Cowley & Jeff Evans
Player of the match: Mohammad Akhtar

7 May 2003
(scorecard)

Hampshire; 213/7 (50 overs)	v	Sussex; 214/6 (49.3 overs)
Simon Katich 82* (95); Billy Taylor 2/52 (10 overs)		Chris Adams 80* (85); Dimitri Mascarenhas 3/31 (10 overs)

Sussex won by 4 wickets
Rose Bowl, Southampton
Umpires: David Constant & Ian Gould
Player of the match: Chris Adams

7 May 2003
(scorecard)

Derbyshire; 299/5 (50 overs)	v	Kent Cricket Board; 128 all out (45.2 overs)
Chris Bassano 101 (111); Terry Rollock 1/28 (10 overs)		Leon Morgan 27 (41); Kevin Dean 3/6 (6 overs)

Derbyshire won by 171 runs
St Lawrence Ground, Canterbury
Umpires: Neil Bainton & Pasty Harris
Player of the match: Chris Bassano

7 May 2003
(scorecard)

Lincolnshire; 279/7 (50 overs)	v	Nottinghamshire; 280/6 (48.1 overs)
Mark Fell 77 (90); Usman Afzaal 2/33 (9 overs)		Paul Franks 84* (70); Jonathan Davies 3/40 (9 overs)

Nottinghamshire won by 4 wickets
Lindum Sports Club Ground, Lincoln
Umpires: Trevor Jesty & Peter Willey
Player of the match: Paul Franks

7 May 2003
(scorecard)

Middlesex; 214/7 (50 overs)	v	Northamptonshire; 188 all out (48.4 overs)
Ed Joyce 72 (88); Graeme Swann 4/40 (8 overs)		Jeffrey Cook 57 (89); Chad Keegan 4/35 (9.4 overs)

Middlesex won by 26 runs
County Ground, Northampton
Umpires: Peter Hartley & Mervyn Kitchen
Player of the match: Ed Joyce

7 May 2003
(scorecard)

Leicestershire; 182/9 (50 overs)	v	Northumberland; 92 all out (25.4 overs)
Paul Nixon 57 (99); Steven Chapman 3/40 (10 overs)		Martin Speight 23 (40); David Masters 4/15 (5.4 overs)

Leicestershire won by 90 runs
Osborne Avenue, Jesmond
Umpires: Tony Clarkson & Neil Mallender
Player of the match: Paul Nixon

7 May 2003
(scorecard)

Scotland; 138/9 (50 overs)	v	Somerset; 142/0 (19.2 overs)

Somerset won by 10 wickets
The Grange Club, Edinburgh
Umpires: Barry Dudleston, Nigel Llong
Player of the match: Marcus Trescothick

7 May 2003
(scorecard)

Surrey; 273 all out (49.3 overs)	v	Staffordshire; 264/4 (50 overs)
Ian Ward 108 (87); Guy Bulpitt 3/39 (10 overs)		Graeme Archer 65 (52); James Ormond 1/33 (10 overs)

Surrey won by 9 runs
Lichfield Road, Stone
Umpires: Allan Jones & Ken Shuttleworth
Player of the match: Ian Ward

7 May 2003
(scorecard)

Worcestershire; 311/4 (50 overs)	v	Worcestershire Cricket Board; 141/9 (50 overs)
Vikram Solanki 164* (170); Imran Jamshed 2/54 (10 overs)		Abdul Hafeez 28 (52); Nantie Hayward 2/19 (8 overs)

Worcestershire won by 170 runs
New Road, Worcester
Umpires: Michael Dixon & John Steele
Player of the match: Vikram Solanki

=== Fourth round ===
28 May 2003
(scorecard)

Lancashire; 229/9 (50 overs)	v	Durham; 86 all out (26.3 overs)
Carl Hooper 61 (72); Dewald Pretorius 3/32 (10 overs)		Nicky Peng 44 (62); James Anderson 3/14 (5 overs)

Lancashire won by 143 runs
Riverside Ground, Chester-le-Street
Umpires: Ian Gould & John Steele
Player of the match: Stuart Law

28 May 2003
(scorecard)

Glamorgan; 248/9 (50 overs)	v	Derbyshire; 251/3 (41.1 overs)
Jonathan Hughes 51 (82); Graeme Welch 3/47 (10 overs)		Chris Bassano 121 (100); Michael Kasprowicz 3/43 (10 overs)

Derbyshire won by 7 wickets
Sophia Gardens, Cardiff
Umpires: Nigel Cowley & Peter Willey
Player of the match: Chris Bassano

28 May 2003
(scorecard)

Kent; 194 all out (47.4 overs)	v	Gloucestershire; 195/5 (45.4 overs)
Greg Blewett 50 (53); Mike Smith 4/35 (10 overs)		Craig Spearman 71 (85); Martin Saggers 3/45 (9.4 overs)

Gloucestershire won by 5 wickets
St Lawrence Ground, Canterbury
Umpires: David Constant & Mervyn Kitchen
Player of the match: Mike Smith

28 May 2003
(scorecard)

Leicestershire; 258/9 (50 overs)	v	Nottinghamshire; 159 all out (40.2 overs)
Virender Sehwag 56 (51); Gareth Clough 3/47 (10 overs)		Chris Cairns 67 (82); Phil DeFreitas 3/20 (10 overs)

Leicestershire won by 99 runs
Grace Road, Leicester
Umpires: Peter Hartley & Jeremy Lloyds
Player of the match: Phil DeFreitas

28 May 2003
(scorecard)

Middlesex; 258/8 (50 overs)	v	Sussex; 241/8 (50 overs)
Andrew Strauss 75 (85); James Kirtley 5/41 (10 overs)		Chris Adams 39 (58); Simon Cook 3/37 (9 overs)

Middlesex won by 17 runs
Lord's, London
Umpires: Vanburn Holder & Trevor Jesty
Player of the match: Andrew Strauss

28 May 2003
(scorecard)

Surrey; 281/6 (50 overs)	v	Somerset; 275/9 (50 overs)
Graham Thorpe 102* (103); Richard Johnson 2/58 (10 overs)		Keith Parsons 83 (93); Adam Hollioake 3/19 (3 overs)

Surrey won by 6 runs
County Ground, Taunton
Umpires: Pasty Harris & Barrie Leadbeater
Player of the match: Graham Thorpe

28 May 2003
(scorecard)

Essex; 256/5 (50 overs)	v	Warwickshire; 257/7 (49.1 overs)
Mark Pettini 92* (81); Dougie Brown 2/37 (10 overs)		Dougie Brown 108 (99); Jonathan Dakin 3/30 (8.1 overs)

Warwickshire won by 3 wickets
Edgbaston, Birmingham
Umpires: Barry Dudleston & Roy Palmer
Player of the match: Dougie Brown

28 May 2003
(scorecard)

Worcestershire; 244/8 (50 overs)	v	Yorkshire; 177 all out (41.1 overs)
David Leatherdale 80 (87); Darren Gough 2/43 (10 overs)		Michael Vaughan 47 (74); Nantie Hayward 5/49 (10 overs)

Worcestershire won by 67 runs
New Road, Worcester
Umpires: Tony Clarkson & Neil Mallender
Player of the match: David Leatherdale

=== Quarter-finals ===
10, 11 June 2003
(scorecard)

Worcestershire; 216/8 (50 overs)	v	Leicestershire; 141 all out (43.5 overs)
Anurag Singh 74 (125); Darren Maddy 3/44 (8 overs)		Darren Stevens 34 (26); Matthew Mason 3/28 (10 overs)

Worcestershire won by 75 runs
Grace Road, Leicester
Umpires: Trevor Jesty & Allan Jones
Player of the match: Anurag Singh

- Reserve day used

11 June 2003
(scorecard)

Derbyshire; 271 all out (50 overs)	v	Surrey; 134 all out (33.4 overs)
Mohammad Kaif 81 (85); Azhar Mahmood 4/49 (10 overs)		Graham Thorpe 37 (55); Graeme Welch 4/26 (7 overs)

Derbyshire won by 137 runs
County Ground, Derby
Umpires: David Constant & Alan Whitehead
Player of the match: Mohammad Kaif

11 June 2003
(scorecard)

Lancashire; 252/7 (50 overs)	v	Middlesex; 195 all out (49.1 overs)
Mal Loye 74 (113); Abdul Razzaq 2/51 (10 overs)		Andrew Strauss 32 (72); Peter Martin 4/34 (10 overs)

Lancashire won by 57 runs
Old Trafford, Manchester
Umpires: Jeff Evans & Barrie Leadbeater
Player of the match: Mal Loye

11 June 2003
(scorecard)

Warwickshire; 204 all out (47.4 overs)	v	Gloucestershire; 206/5 (40.5 overs)
Nick Knight 88 (122); Ian Harvey 5/23 (9 overs)		Phil Weston 88* (124); Waqar Younis 2/41 (8.5 overs)

Gloucestershire won by 5 wickets
Edgbaston, Birmingham
Umpires: Graham Burgess & Nigel Llong
Player of the match: Ian Harvey

=== Semi-finals ===
7 August 2003
(scorecard)

Derbyshire; 219 all out (49.3 overs)	v	Gloucestershire; 221/9 (45.5 overs)
Mohammad Kaif 72 (83); Mike Smith 2/35 (10 overs)		Shoaib Malik 74 (83); Kevin Dean 2/37 (10 overs)

Gloucestershire won by 1 wicket
County Ground, Bristol
Umpires: Mark Benson & Barry Dudleston
Player of the match: Shoaib Malik

9 August 2003
(scorecard)

Worcestershire; 254/5 (50 overs)	v	Lancashire; 248/9 (50 overs)
Graeme Hick 97 (112); Andrew Flintoff 2/33 (8 overs)		Mal Loye 116 (154); Andrew Hall 4/36 (10 overs)

Worcestershire won by 6 runs
New Road, Worcester
Umpires: John Hampshire & John Holder
Player of the match: Andrew Hall

=== Final ===
30 August 2003
(scorecard)

Worcestershire; 149 all out (46.3 overs)	v	Gloucestershire; 150/3 (20.3 overs)
Vikram Solanki 40 (51); Alex Gidman 2/12 (7 overs)		Ian Harvey 61 (36); Matthew Mason 1/38 (7 overs)

Gloucestershire won by 7 wickets
Lord's, London
Umpires: Mark Benson & John Hampshire
Player of the match: Ian Harvey
