= Aftab Ahmed (cricketer, born 1967) =

Pakistani-born Danish cricketer (born 1967)

Personal information
- Full name: Aftab Ahmed
- Born: 17 May 1967 (age 59); Pakistan
- Batting: Right-handed
- Bowling: Right-arm medium

International information
- National side: Denmark

Domestic team information
- Years: Team
- 1999–2003: Denmark

Career statistics
Competition	List A
Matches	14
Runs scored	315
Batting average	24.23
100s/50s	–0/2
Top score	94
Balls bowled	156
Wickets	3
Bowling average	48.33
5 wickets in innings	–
10 wickets in match	–
Best bowling	2/46
Catches/stumpings	4/–
- Source: CricketArchive, 16 January 2011

Aftab Ahmed (born 17 May 1967) is a Pakistani-born former Danish cricketer. Ahmed is a right-handed batsman who bowled right-arm medium pace.

He made his debut for Denmark in a friendly against the Netherlands at Schiedam. He played two matches later in 1989 against the Australians who were returning from their tour of England. The following year he made his ICC Trophy debut in the 1990 ICC Trophy, which was held in the Netherlands, playing his first match in that competition against Gibraltar. He made five further appearances in that year's competition, scoring 70 runs with a high score of 34. He next appeared in the ICC Trophy when he played in the 1994 ICC Trophy in Kenya, making eight appearances during the tournament. scoring 116 runs at an average of 16.57, with a high score of 61. This score was his only half century in the tournament and came against Hong Kong.

In 1999, Denmark were invited to take part in English county cricket's domestic one-tournament, the NatWest Trophy, with Denmark making its inaugural appearance in List A cricket in the tournament against the Kent Cricket Board, with Ahmed playing in that match and scoring 4 runs before being dismissed by Andy Tutt. The following year, he played for Denmark in the 2000 ICC Emerging Nations Tournament in Zimbabwe, making five List A appearances against Zimbabwe A, the Netherlands, Scotland, Ireland and Kenya. He scored 57 runs in his five matches, at an average of 11.40 and with a high score of 21. He made a further List A appearance later in the year in the 2000 NatWest Trophy against the Durham Cricket Board, with Ahmed being run out for 94 in the Denmark's innings of 218 all out. Despite this, Denmark lost by 5 wickets. He also captained the team for the first time in this match, inheriting the captaincy from Morten Andersen.

He later took part in the 2001 ICC Trophy in Canada, making nine appearances during the tournament. This was his most successful ICC Trophy, with Ahmed scoring 280 runs at an average of 40.00, with a high score of 86 not out, which was his only half century of the tournament and came against Ireland. He made a further List A appearance for Denmark later in 2001, against Suffolk in the 1st round of the 2002 Cheltenham & Gloucester Trophy, which was played in 2001 to avoid fixture congestion in the following season. He made a further List A appearance in 2002, against the Leicestershire Cricket Board in the 1st round of the 2003 Cheltenham & Gloucester Trophy, played to the same arrangement of the previous seasons first round matches. Once again captaining the team, Ahmed recorded his second List A half century with a score of 77 in Denmark's total of 249, before he was dismissed by Neil Pullen. His final List A appearance for Denmark in the English limited-overs tournament came in 2003 against Wales Minor Counties in the 1st round of the 2004 Cheltenham & Gloucester Trophy, by which time the captaincy had passed to Soren Vestergaard.

Ahmed played in his fourth and final ICC Trophy in the 2005 ICC Trophy in Ireland. This tournaments matches, unlike previous tournaments, had been afforded List A status by the International Cricket Council. He played four matches during the tournament, against Uganda, the United Arab Emirates, Ireland, and the Netherlands, which was his final List A appearance. He scored just 41 runs in his four matches, at an average of 13.66. In total, Ahmed made fourteen List A appearances for Denmark in his career, scoring 315 runs at an average of 24.23, with a high score of 94. With the ball, he took 3 wickets at a bowling average of 48.33, with best figures of 2/46.
