= Parkgate Cricket Ground =

Cricket ground in Parkgate, Cheshire, England

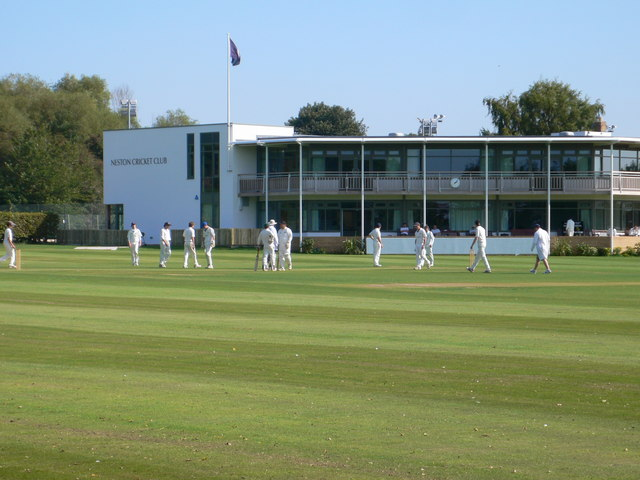
- Interactive map of Parkgate Cricket Ground

Ground information
- Location: Parkgate, Cheshire
- Country: England
- Coordinates: 53.2926°N 3.0783°W
- Establishment: c. 1910

Team information
Cheshire	(1935–2011)
- As of 11 July 2012; Source: Ground profile

Parkgate Cricket Ground is a cricket ground in Station Road, Parkgate, Cheshire. The ground, which is situated close to the bank of the River Dee, is mostly surrounded by residential housing. The site is fairly large, with two cricket pitches, lawn tennis courts, all weather floodlit tennis courts, lawn bowls, boules, 3 squash courts and a full floodlit AstroTurf field hockey pitch. It is used by Neston Cricket Club and Neston Hockey Club. The club also has representative Tennis, Squash and Racquetball teams.

The ground is also home to the Parkgate Club House featuring 3 bars, a Cafe and 2 function rooms.

== History ==
Neston Cricket Club has existed for over a hundred years, with the first recorded match at the ground coming in 1931 when Neston played Wallasey. Cheshire first played at the ground in the 1935 Minor Counties Championship against Denbighshire, with Cheshire playing two further matches there before World War II. Minor counties cricket returned to the ground in 1950, when Cheshire played the Worcestershire Second XI. The county played seven matches there during the 1950s, but only two in the proceeding decade, both against Staffordshire in 1960 and 1963. Cheshire returned to the ground in 1980, playing the Lancashire Second XI, who they also played there in 1981. The ground held its first MCCA Knockout Trophy match in 1984, when Cheshire played Cumberland.

Cheshire would next play at the ground in the 1989 Minor Counties Championship against Wales Minor Counties, with Cheshire playing there annually (with the exception of 1995) until 2000, when the ground held its last Minor Counties Championship with Berkshire as the visitors. The ground held a single List A match when Cheshire played Lincolnshire in the 2nd round of the 2003 Cheltenham & Gloucester Trophy, whose early rounds were played in 2002 to avoid fixture congestion in the following season. Lincolnshire won the match by 4 runs. Cheshire last played there in 2011, in an MCCA Knockout Trophy match against Cumberland.

In 2017 as well as the many Cheshire representative age group games and the annual Lancashire 2nd XI game, the ground also played host to the Natwest LD Tri-Nations final which saw England beat Australia.

In 2009, the new Parkgate Clubhouse was redeveloped to its present state.

== Marquee Week ==
A special marquee week is hosted by The Neston Club at their Parkgate Cricket Ground over the first weekend in July each year. The weekend consists of a Sporting Lunch on the Thursday, The Parkgate Proms on the Friday and a Summer Ball on the Saturday.

== Records ==
=== List A ===
- Highest team total: 281/7 (50 overs) by Lincolnshire v Cheshire, 2002
- Lowest team total: 277/8 (50 overs), as above
- Highest individual innings: 90 by Martyn Dobson, as above
- Best bowling in an innings: 4/10 by Mark Fell, as above

== Gallery ==
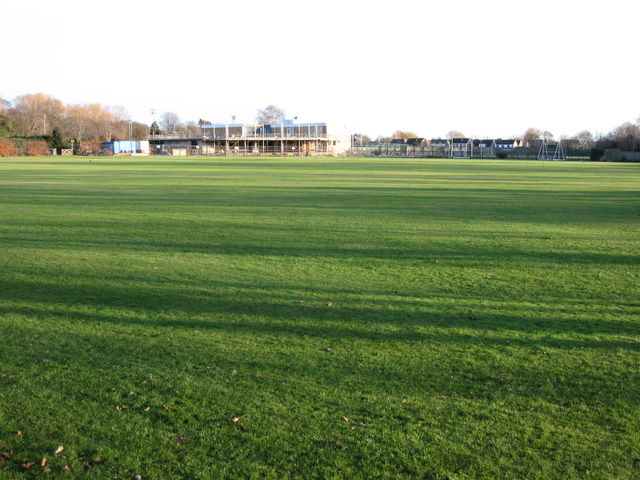
View of the ground with the pavilion under construction in 2009.

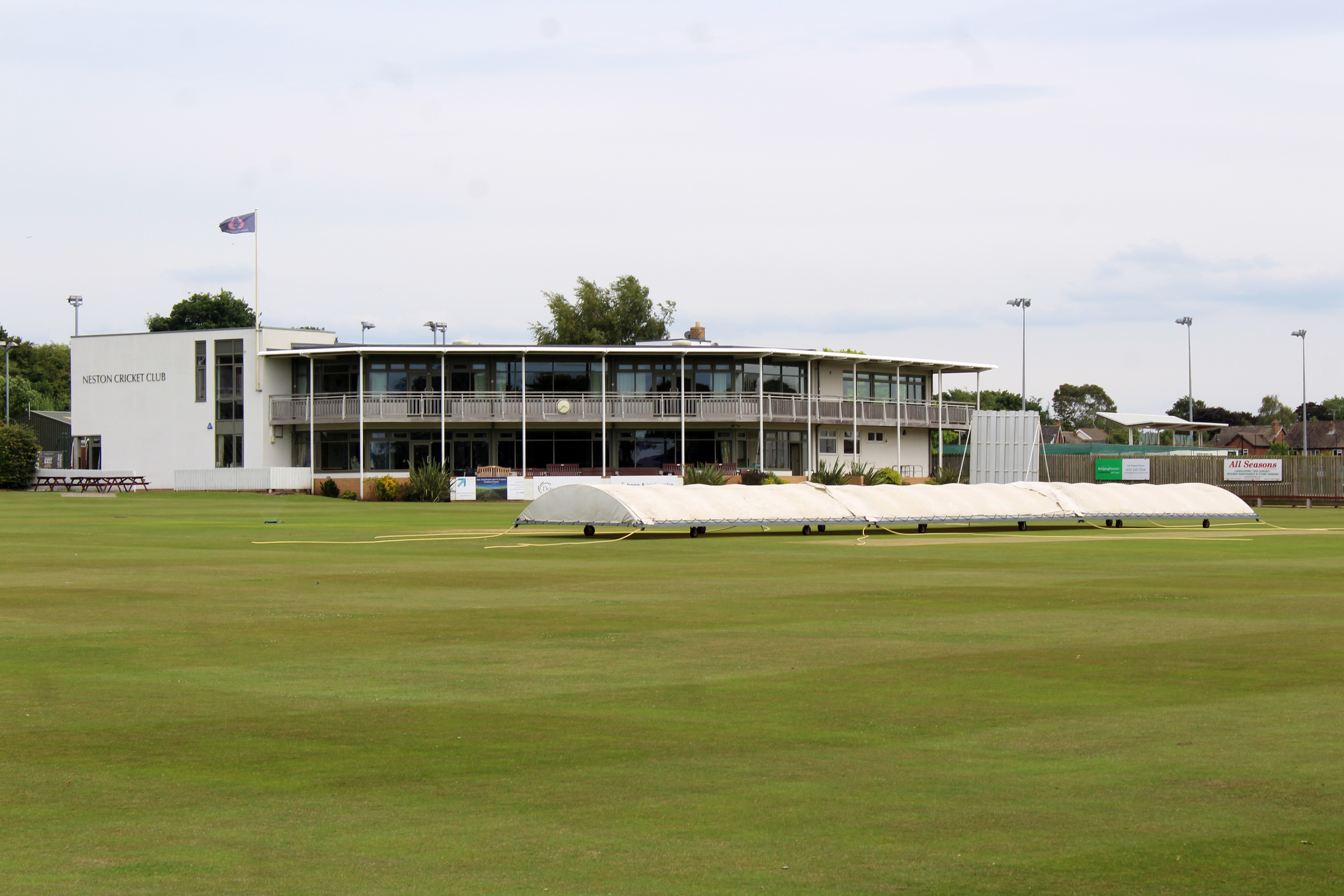
View of the completed pavilion.

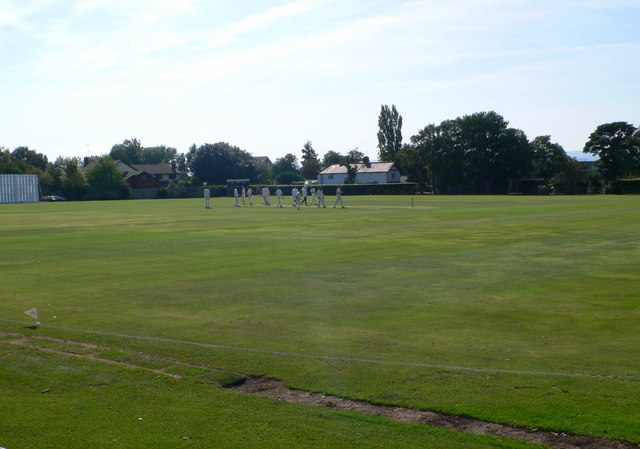
View of the ground looking north.

== See also ==
- List of cricket grounds in England and Wales
