= Vernon Hill (disambiguation) =

Vernon Hill (born 1945) is an American businessman and bank executive.

Vernon Hill may also refer to:

- Vernon Hill (cricketer, born 1871) (1871–1932), Welsh-born English cricketer
- Vernon Hill (cricketer, born 1978), English cricketer
- Vernon Hill (sculptor) (1882–1972), English sculptor
- Vernon Hill, Virginia, unincorporated community in Halifax County, Virginia, United States

== See also ==
- Vernon Hills, Illinois, suburb of Chicago in Lake County, Illinois, United States
  - Vernon Hills High School, school located in Vernon Hills, Illinois
  - Vernon Hills station, station on Metra's North Central Service in Vernon Hills, Illinois
- Hill (surname)
