= Gavin Franklin =

English cricketer (born 1978)

Personal information
- Full name: Gavin David Franklin
- Born: 9 January 1978 (age 48); Wolverhampton, West Midlands, England
- Batting: Right-handed
- Bowling: Right-arm off break
- Role: Occasional wicket-keeper

Domestic team information
- Years: Team
- 1997–2003: Staffordshire
- 1998–1999: Warwickshire Cricket Board
- 2000: British Universities

Career statistics
Competition	First-class	List A
Matches	1	2
Runs scored	12	102
Batting average	12.00	51.00
100s/50s	0/0	0/1
Top score	12	63
Balls bowled	60	–
Wickets	0	–
Bowling average	–	–
5 wickets in innings	–	–
10 wickets in match	–	–
Best bowling	–	–
Catches/stumpings	0/–	2/–
- Source: Cricinfo, 13 June 2011

Gavin David Franklin (born 9 January 1978) is a former English cricketer. He is now headmaster of Amesbury School. Franklin played as a right-handed batsman who bowled right-arm off break, who could also when needed field as a wicket-keeper. He was born in Wolverhampton and educated at Malvern College.

== Cricket ==
Franklin made his debut for Staffordshire in the 1997 Minor Counties Championship, making two appearances that season against Hertfordshire and Northumberland. The following season, he played in the MCCA Knockout Trophy for Warwickshire Cricket Board, also appearing for the team in the 1999 competition. 1998 saw Franklin attend Durham University, where he played for the university cricket team. Playing for the university team allowed Franklin to make his only first-class cricket appearance, representing British Universities against the touring Zimbabweans.

Following his studies at Durham, Franklin rejoined Staffordshire for the 2002 and 2003 seasons. He made his List A debut against Hampshire Cricket Board in the second round of the 2003 Cheltenham & Gloucester Trophy, held in 2002. He marked his debut by scoring 63 runs from 111 balls. He played a further List A match in the third round of the competition, which took place the following year, against Surrey, scoring 39 runs in a match that Staffordshire lost narrowly by nine runs.

== Professional career ==
Franklin took up his appointment as headteacher of Wellesley House in September 2017. In 2023 he became headmaster of Amesbury School in Surrey.
