= Rajesh Rao (cricketer) =

English cricketer

Personal information
- Full name: Rajesh Krishnakant Rao
- Born: 9 December 1974 (age 51); Park Royal, London, England
- Batting: Right-handed
- Bowling: Leg break googly

Domestic team information
- Years: Team
- 1996–1999: Sussex
- 2000–2002: Middlesex Cricket Board

Career statistics
Competition	First-class	List A
Matches	27	44
Runs scored	874	1,038
Batting average	20.80	24.71
100s/50s	0/6	1/7
Top score	89	158
Balls bowled	491	163
Wickets	4	5
Bowling average	74.00	33.80
5 wickets in innings	0	0
10 wickets in match	0	0
Best bowling	1/1	3/31
Catches/stumpings	7/–	12/–
- Source: Cricinfo, 19 November 2010

Rajesh Krishnakant Rao (born 9 December 1974) is a former English cricketer. Rao was a right-handed batsman who bowled leg break googly. He was born in Park Royal, London.

Rao made his first-class debut for Sussex against Cambridge University in 1996. From 1996 to 1999, he represented the county in 27 first-class matches, the last of which came against Gloucestershire in the County Championship. In his 27 first-class matches for Sussex, he scored 874 runs at an average of 20.80, with six half centuries and a high score of 89. In the field he took 7 catches. With the ball he took 4 wickets at a bowling average of 74.00, with best figures of 1/1. It was for Sussex that Rao also made his debut in List A cricket, which came against Durham in the 1996 AXA Equity and Law League. From 1996 to 1999, he represented the county in 40 List A matches, the last of which came against Gloucestershire in the Benson and Hedges Cup.

In 2000, he played his first List A match for the Middlesex Cricket Board against Wiltshire in the 2000 NatWest Trophy. From 2000 to 2002, he represented the Board in four List A matches, the last of which came against Cambridgeshire in the 2nd round of the 2003 Cheltenham & Gloucester Trophy which was held in 2002. In his career total of 44 List A matches, he scored 1,038 runs at an average of 24.71, with 7 half centuries and a single century high score of 15. In the field he took 12 catches, while with the ball he took 5 wickets at an average of 33.80, with best figures of 3/31.
