= James Hand =

James Hand may refer to:

- James Hand (footballer) (born 1986), Irish footballer
- James Hand (musician) (1952–2020), American country singer and songwriter
- James Hand (presenter), British television presenter

== See also ==
- Jamie Hand (born 1984), English footballer and scout
- James Hands (born 1978), English cricketer
- James Handy, American actor
