= Richard Barlow =

Richard Barlow may refer to:

- Richard Barlow (intelligence analyst), American intelligence analyst
- Richard Barlow (cricketer) (born 1972), English cricketer
- Richard E. Barlow (1931–2024), American mathematician and mathematical statistician

== See also ==
- Dick Barlow (1851–1919), English cricketer
