= Cordingley =

Cordingley is a surname. Notable people with the surname include:

- Albert Cordingley (1871–1945), English cricketer
- Patrick Cordingley (born 1944), British general
- Sam Cordingley (born 1976), Australian rugby union footballer
- Steve Cordingley (born 1981), English cricketer
- Troy Cordingley (born 1967), Canadian lacrosse player and coach

== See also ==
- Georges Ricard-Cordingley, French artist
- Cordingly, a surname
