= Paul Smith (cricketer, born 1975) =

English cricketer (born 1975)

Personal information
- Full name: Paul Christopher Smith
- Born: 29 April 1975 (age 51); Hillingdon, London, England
- Batting: Right-handed
- Role: Wicketkeeper

Domestic team information
- Years: Team
- 2002: Middlesex Cricket Board

Career statistics
| Competition | LA |
|---|---|
| Matches | 1 |
| Runs scored | – |
| Batting average | – |
| 100s/50s | –/– |
| Top score | – |
| Balls bowled | – |
| Wickets | – |
| Bowling average | – |
| 5 wickets in innings | – |
| 10 wickets in match | – |
| Best bowling | – |
| Catches/stumpings | –/1 |
- Source: Cricinfo, 18 November 2010

Paul Christopher Smith (born 29 April 1975) is a former English cricketer. Smith was a right-handed batsman who played primarily as a wicketkeeper. He was born in Hillingdon, London.

Smith represented the Middlesex Cricket Board in a single List A match against Derbyshire Cricket Board in the 1st round of the 2003 Cheltenham & Gloucester Trophy which was held in 2002. In his only List A match he was not required to bat and behind the stumps he made a single stumping.
