= Christopher Coleman (cricketer) =

English cricketer (born 1980)

Personal information
- Full name: Christopher Philip Coleman
- Born: 1 June 1980 (age 46); Ashford, Surrey, England
- Batting: Right-handed
- Role: Wicketkeeper

Domestic team information
- Years: Team
- 2002: Middlesex Cricket Board

Career statistics
Competition	LA
Matches	1
Runs scored	4
Batting average	–
100s/50s	–/–
Top score	4*
Balls bowled	–
Wickets	–
Bowling average	–
5 wickets in innings	–
10 wickets in match	–
Best bowling	–
Catches/stumpings	1/–
- Source: Cricinfo, 18 November 2010

Christopher Philip Coleman (born 1 June 1980) is a former English cricketer. Coleman was a right-handed batsman who played primarily as a wicketkeeper. He was born at Ashford, Surrey.

Coleman represented the Middlesex Cricket Board in a single List A match against Cambridgeshire in the 2nd round of the 2003 Cheltenham & Gloucester Trophy which was held in 2002. In his only List A match he scored an unbeaten 4 runs. Behind the stumps he took a single catch.
