= Alastair Fraser =

English cricketer

Personal information
- Full name: Alastair Gregory James Fraser
- Born: 17 October 1967 (age 59); Edgware, London, England
- Batting: Right-handed
- Bowling: Right-arm fast-medium
- Relatives: Angus Fraser (brother)

Domestic team information
- Years: Team
- 1986–1989: Middlesex
- 1991–1992: Essex
- 1998: Middlesex
- 1999–2002: Middlesex Cricket Board

Career statistics
Competition	First-class	List A
Matches	10	30
Runs scored	137	240
Batting average	27.40	17.14
100s/50s	0/1	0/1
Top score	52*	57*
Balls bowled	745	1,081
Wickets	12	30
Bowling average	32.16	27.20
5 wickets in innings	0	0
10 wickets in match	0	0
Best bowling	3/46	4/19
Catches/stumpings	1/–	3/–
- Source: Cricinfo, 20 November 2010

Alastair Gregory James Fraser (born 17 October 1967) is an English cricketer. Fraser is a right-handed batsman who bowls right-arm fast-medium. He was born in Edgware, London and later educated at Harrow Weald Sixth Form College.

== Early career ==
Fraser made his first-class debut for Middlesex against the touring New Zealanders in 1986. From 1986 to 1988, he represented the county in 5 first-class matches, the last of which came against Cambridge University. It was for Middlesex that he made his debut in List A cricket, which came against Lancashire in 1986. From 1986 to 1989, he played 5 List A matches for the county.

In 1991, he joined Essex where he made his debut in a first-class match for the county against Sussex. From 1991 to 1992, he represented the county in 5 first-class matches, the last of which came against Somerset in the 1992 County Championship. This marked the final first-class match Fraser would play; in total he played 10 first-class matches, scoring 137 runs at a batting average of 27.40, with a single half century high score of 52*. In the field he took a single catch, while with the ball he took 12 wickets at a bowling average of 32.16, with best figures of 3/46. Fraser also played 8 List A matches for Essex during his two-year stint with the county, with his final one-day match for them coming against Gloucestershire in the 1992 Sunday League.

== Later career ==
In 1998, he rejoined Middlesex. During that season he played just List A cricket for the county, making 11 appearances in that format. His final match for the county came Sussex in the 1998 AXA League.

In 1999, he made his debut for the Middlesex Cricket Board List A cricket against Cumberland in the 1999 NatWest Trophy. From 1999 to 2002, he represented the Board in 5 List A matches, the last of which came against Cambridgeshire in the 2nd round of the 2003 Cheltenham & Gloucester Trophy which was held in 2002. During his professional career, Fraser played a total of 30 List A matches, in which he scored 240 runs at an average of 17.14, with a single half century high score of 57*. With the ball he took 30 wickets at an average of 27.20, with best figures of 4/19.

He currently plays club cricket for Stanmore Cricket Club in the Middlesex County Cricket League.

== Family ==
His brother, Angus, played Test and One Day International cricket for England. He also played first-class cricket for Middlesex, the Marylebone Cricket Club as well as List A cricket for Wellington in New Zealand.
