= Robert Pack =

Robert Pack may refer to:

- Robert Pack (basketball) (born 1969), American basketball player
- Robert Pack (politician) (1786–1860), Newfoundland merchant, politician and justice
- Robert Pack (poet) (1929–2023), American poet and critic
- Robert Pack (cricketer) (born 1970), English cricketer

== See also ==
- Robert Packe (1913–1935), English first-class cricketer
