= Mark Fell =

Mark Fell may refer to:

- Mark Fell (cricketer)
- Mark Fell (artist)
