= Robert Nelson (cricketer, born 1970) =

English cricketer

Personal information
- Full name: Robert David Nelson
- Born: 2 July 1970 (age 56); Chiswick, London, England
- Batting: Left-handed
- Bowling: Right-hand off break

Domestic team information
- Years: Team
- 2000 & 2002: Middlesex Cricket Board

Career statistics
| Competition | LA |
|---|---|
| Matches | 3 |
| Runs scored | 7 |
| Batting average | 7.00 |
| 100s/50s | –/– |
| Top score | 15* |
| Balls bowled | 138 |
| Wickets | – |
| Bowling average | – |
| 5 wickets in innings | – |
| 10 wickets in match | – |
| Best bowling | – |
| Catches/stumpings | –/– |
- Source: Cricinfo, 19 November 2010

Robert David Nelson (born 2 July 1970) is an English cricketer. Nelson is a left-handed batsman who bowls right-arm off break. He was born in Chiswick, London and later educated at Harrow School.

Nelson represented the Middlesex Cricket Board in 3 List A matches. These came against Wiltshire and Sussex in the 2000 NatWest Trophy and the Derbyshire Cricket Board in the 1st round of the 2003 Cheltenham & Gloucester Trophy which was held in 2002. In his 3 career List A match he scored 7 runs at a batting average of 7.00, with a high score of 5*. With the ball he bowled 23 wicket-less overs.

He currently plays club cricket Brondesbury Cricket Club in the Middlesex County Cricket League where he has played since he was an u9 colt and is the leading wicket taker in the 1st XI league with 425 wickets.

He was captain of the club in their successful double winning side in 1999 winning the Middlesex Premiership League and Evening Standard cup (at the Oval). In the following year Brondesbury retained their Premier League title under his captaincy.

In 2020 Nelson made his debut for the Middlesex County Over-50s and was then selected for the England Over-50s team making his ODI debut vs Wales on 23 August 2020 taking 2–13.

in 2023 Nelson was part of the England Over50s squad that lifted the World Cup in South Africa. England beat South Africa in the final by 65 runs.
