= Stephen Price (cricketer) =

English cricketer (born 1979)

Personal information
- Full name: Stephen James Price
- Born: 30 March 1979 (age 47); Shrewsbury, Shropshire, England
- Batting: Right-handed
- Bowling: Right-arm off break

Domestic team information
- Years: Team
- 2001–2002: Middlesex Cricket Board
- 1995–1999: Herefordshire

Career statistics
Competition	List A
Matches	7
Runs scored	134
Batting average	22.33
100s/50s	0/1
Top score	85
Catches/stumpings	1/–
- Source: Cricinfo, 18 November 2010

Stephen James Price (born 30 March 1979) is a former English cricketer. Price was a right-handed batsman who bowled right-arm off break. He was born at Shrewsbury, Shropshire.

Price made his Minor Counties Championship for Herefordshire against Dorset in 1995. From 1995 to 1999, he represented the county in 22 Championship matches, the last of which came against Cornwall. In 1998, he made his MCCA Knockout Trophy debut for the county against Wiltshire. From 1998 to 1999, he represented the county in 6 Trophy matches, the last of which came against the Worcestershire Cricket Board. In 1998, he made his debut in List A cricket for the county against Middlesex in the 1998 NatWest Trophy. In the following season's competition, he played 2 further List A matches for the county against Wiltshire and Yorkshire.

Later, in 2001, he represented the Middlesex Cricket Board in List A cricket. His debut in that format for the Board came against Berkshire in the 2001 Cheltenham & Gloucester Trophy. From 2001 to 2002, he represented the Board in 4 List A matches, the last of which came against Cambridgeshire in the 2nd round of the 2003 Cheltenham & Gloucester Trophy which was held in 2002. In his career total of 7 List A matches, he scored 134 runs at a batting average of 22.33, with a single half century high score of 85. In the field he took a single catch.
