= Søren Vestergaard =

Danish cricketer (born 1972)

Personal information
- Full name: Søren Vestergaard
- Born: 1 March 1972 (age 54); Copenhagen, Denmark
- Nickname: Vester
- Batting: Right-handed
- Bowling: Right-arm fast

International information
- National side: Denmark

Domestic team information
- Years: Team
- 2003: Denmark

Career statistics
Competition	List A
Matches	6
Runs scored	66
Batting average	11.00
100s/50s	–/–
Top score	39
Balls bowled	78
Wickets	1
Bowling average	65.00
5 wickets in innings	–
10 wickets in match	–
Best bowling	1/22
Catches/stumpings	–/–
- Source: CricketArchive, 16 January 2011

Søren Vestergaard (born 1 March 1972, in Copenhagen) is a former Danish cricketer. Vestergaard was a right-handed batsman who bowled right-arm fast.

== Early career ==
Prior to playing for Denmark at any level, Vestergaard had been scouted by Welsh county Glamorgan in 1990, making a single Second XI appearance for the county in a one-day match against the Warwickshire Second XI. In July 1991, Vestergaard appeared in two matches for Denmark Under-19s against Bermuda Under-19s and Ireland Under-19s during an International Youth Tournament in Winnipeg, Canada. In that same year he first appeared for Denmark in a friendly against English minor county Durham. Further matches for Denmark followed in friendly appearances against Wales and the Netherlands in 1992, as well as the Netherlands and Scotland in 1993. He played in his first ICC Trophy in Kenya in the 1994 ICC Trophy, making his first appearance in that competition against Hong Kong. He made seven further appearances in the 1994 competition, scoring a total of 123 runs at an average of 30.75, with a high score of 25, while with the ball he took 4 wickets at a bowling average of 50.75.

Having shown promise in his appearances for Denmark, Vestergaard played Second XI cricket in English county cricket for Warwickshire in the 1994 season. He played Second XI cricket for Warwickshire until the 1998 season, but was unable to force his way into the Warwickshire first eleven. He appeared in his second ICC Trophy in the 1997 version, making six appearances in the competition. Vestergaard took 12 wickets in his six matches, which came at an average of 6.75, with best figures of 3/15. He was less successful with the bat, scoring 66 runs at an average of 13.20, with a high score of 24. During that period when he played Second XI cricket in England, he also played for Denmark in the 1996 and 1998 European Cricket Championship.

== Later career ==
Vestergaard's next ICC Trophy appearance came in Canada in the 2001 ICC Trophy, where he played in eight matches. The tournament was highly successful for him, with Vestergaard ending it as the tournaments joint leading wicket-taker alongside the Netherlands Roland Lefebvre, with 20 wickets at an average of 11.55. In his third match of the tournament against the United States, he claimed a hat-trick. He scored 151 runs in his eight matches, which came at an average of 18.87, with a high score of 47. This was his last appearance in the ICC Trophy, with him not appearing the 2005 ICC Trophy in Ireland.

He later made his debut in List A cricket for Denmark against Wales Minor Counties in the 1st round of the 2004 Cheltenham & Gloucester Trophy, which was played in August 2003 to avoid fixture congestion the following season. At the time, Denmark were permitted to take part in the domestic one-day tournament in English county cricket. Vestergaard captained the team in this match, having inherited the captaincy from Aftab Ahmed, scoring 4 runs in Denmark's innings of 189/8, before he was dismissed by Tony Smith. Wales Minor Counties won the match by seven wickets, with Vestergaard bowling seven wicketless overs during their chase. He played intermittently for Denmark over the next few years, appearing for them in the 2004 and 2008 European Cricket Championship Division One. Vestergaard was later selected in Denmark's squad for the World Cup Qualifier in South Africa, by which time the captaincy has passed to Frederik Klokker. He made seven List A appearances in the tournament, including his final appearance to date in that format, against Uganda. He took a single wicket during the tournament (that of Ugandan Benjamin Musoke), while with the bat he scored 62 runs at an average of 12.40, with a high score of 39, which came against Afghanistan. This tournament marks the last time he has played for Denmark.

Outside of cricket, he works as a teacher.
