= David Young (cricketer) =

English cricketer and sport psychologist

Personal information
- Full name: David John Young
- Born: 11 December 1977 (age 48); Coventry, Warwickshire, England
- Height: 6 ft 2 in (1.88 m)
- Batting: Right-handed

Domestic team information
- Years: Team
- 2002: Middlesex Cricket Board

Career statistics
| Competition | LA |
|---|---|
| Matches | 2 |
| Runs scored | 32 |
| Batting average | 16.00 |
| 100s/50s | –/– |
| Top score | 22 |
| Balls bowled | – |
| Wickets | – |
| Bowling average | – |
| 5 wickets in innings | – |
| 10 wickets in match | – |
| Best bowling | – |
| Catches/stumpings | 2/– |
- Source: Cricinfo, 18 November 2010

David John Young (born 11 December 1977) is a former English cricketer and a sport psychologist. Young was a right-handed batsman. He was born in Coventry, Warwickshire.

Young studied at Durham University, where he appeared for the university team. He later represented the Middlesex Cricket Board in 2 List A matches against the Derbyshire Cricket Board and Cambridgeshire in the 1st and 2nd rounds of the 2003 Cheltenham & Gloucester Trophy which were held in 2002. In his 2 List A matches, he scored 32 runs at a batting average of 16.00, with a high score of 22.

Since 2019 Young is the Manchester City FC 1st team psychologist, having previously held the same position with the England cricket team for a number of years.
