= Stewart Eaton =

English cricketer (born 1979)

Personal information
- Full name: Stewart Mark Eaton
- Born: 28 July 1979 (age 47); Crewe, Cheshire, England
- Batting: Right-handed
- Bowling: Right-arm medium

Domestic team information
- Years: Team
- 2001–2003: Cheshire

Career statistics
Competition	List A
Matches	3
Runs scored	28
Batting average	14.00
100s/50s	–/–
Top score	28
Balls bowled	162
Wickets	2
Bowling average	39.00
5 wickets in innings	–
10 wickets in match	–
Best bowling	2/52
Catches/stumpings	1/–
- Source: Cricinfo, 7 April 2011

Stewart Mark Eaton (born 28 July 1979) is a former English cricketer. Eaton was a right-handed batsman who bowled right-arm medium pace. He was born in Crewe, Cheshire.

Eaton made his debut for Cheshire in the 2001 Minor Counties Championship against Wiltshire. Eaton played Minor counties cricket for Cheshire from 2001 to 2003, including 3 Minor Counties Championship matches and 3 MCCA Knockout Trophy matches. In 2001, he made his List A debut against the Lancashire Cricket Board in the 1st round of the 2002 Cheltenham & Gloucester Trophy which was played in 2001. He played two further List A matches for Cheshire, against Cornwall in 2nd round of the same competition (also played in 2001) and Lincolnshire in the 2nd round of the 2003 Cheltenham & Gloucester Trophy which was played in 2002. In his three List A matches, he scored 28 runs at a batting average of 14.00, with a high score of 28. With the ball he took 3 wickets at a bowling average of 39.00, with best figures of 2/52.

He also played Second XI cricket for the Leicestershire Second XI in 1998.
