= Angus Fraser =

English cricketer (born 1965)

Personal information
- Full name: Angus Robert Charles Fraser
- Born: 8 August 1965 (age 61); Billinge Higher End, Lancashire, England
- Nickname: Gus, Gnat
- Height: 6 ft 6 in (1.98 m)
- Batting: Right-handed
- Bowling: Right arm fast-medium
- Role: Bowler
- Relatives: Alastair Fraser (brother)

International information
- National side: England (1989–1999)
- Test debut (cap 537): 6 July 1989 v Australia
- Last Test: 26 December 1998 v Australia
- ODI debut (cap 103): 15 October 1989 v Sri Lanka
- Last ODI: 29 May 1999 v India

Domestic team information
- Years: Team
- 1984–2002: Middlesex
- 1987/88: Wellington

Career statistics
Competition	Test	ODI	FC	LA
Matches	46	42	290	336
Runs scored	388	141	2,934	865
Batting average	7.46	12.81	11.19	11.68
100s/50s	0/0	0/0	0/2	0/0
Top score	32	38*	92	38*
Balls bowled	10,876	2,392	56,281	17,112
Wickets	177	47	886	392
Bowling average	27.32	30.04	27.40	26.49
5 wickets in innings	13	0	36	1
10 wickets in match	2	0	5	0
Best bowling	8/53	4/22	8/53	5/32
Catches/stumpings	9/–	5/–	54/–	56/–
- Source: Cricinfo, 11 April 2008

Angus Robert Charles Fraser MBE (born 8 August 1965) is an English cricket administrator and former player. Fraser played in forty-six Test matches and forty-two One Day Internationals for England, and played for Middlesex in his first-class career between 1984 and 2002, winning the County Championship three times. He was awarded an MBE in the 1999 New Year Honours and was named one of the Wisden Cricketers of the Year in 1996.

As an administrator, he served as the managing director of Middlesex Cricket between 2009 and 2021, with Middlesex winning the County Championship under his stewardship in 2016, before assuming a new role heading the club's academy and serving as managing director of the Middlesex in the Community charity. He is also a former journalist and England cricket team selector.

== Early life ==
Born in Billinge Higher End, Lancashire, He moved south with his family when he was two years-old. Fraser was educated at the Gayton High School in Harrow, London and Orange Hill High School, Edgware, Greater London.

== Cricket career ==
Fraser played all of his county cricket for Middlesex in a first-class career lasting until 2002; he served as county captain from 2001 until his retirement in 2002. In the 1996 edition of Wisden, Fraser was one of the Wisden Cricketers of the Year.

Fraser began his county career with Middlesex in 1984, making his debut against Glamorgan in Swansea and taking a wicket in his third over, bowling John Hopkins. He had played club cricket prior to that with Stanmore and with Middlesex Second-XI in 1983. He helped Middlesex to win the County Championship in 1985, 1990 and 1993. He also helped Middlesex to win the 1988 NatWest Trophy, taking 3–36 in the final, and the 1990 Refuge Assurance Cup.

He made his Test match debut with England in 1989 against Australia at Edgebaston, with Steve Waugh as his first test wicket. In his fourth Test in 1990 he took his first five-wicket haul in Tests, in the process helping England to their first Test victory over the West Indies for sixteen years and 30 Tests. However England missed his contributions when he was forced to withdraw from this series with injury, as was the case during the Ashes series the following winter. A hip injury then kept him out of Test cricket for two and a half years, but he made an immediate impact on his return at the Oval in 1993, taking eight wickets as England recorded their first Test victory over Australia for 18 Tests and six and a half years.

Perhaps his finest hour came in the Barbados Test match of the 1993/94 West Indies tour when Fraser took 8–75 in the first innings to help set up a famous victory, West Indies' first defeat at Bridgetown for over half a century. His career-best first-class cricket innings bowling figures of 8–53 were taken in a Test match and against the same opposition, this time at Port of Spain, Trinidad and Tobago, in 1997/98. Despite taking eight wickets in that innings, and Test career best match figures of 11–110, he was not named Man of the Match which was awarded to Carl Hooper, from the victorious West Indies side. In all, Fraser toured the West Indies three times, and as of 2002, he has taken more Test wickets in the West Indies than any other visiting bowler, with 54, and ended his career with 70 wickets against the West Indies at 23.70.

His one-day international highest score of 38 not out was made late in the innings at number 10, which included a massive six off Steve Waugh and almost brought England back from the brink of defeat against Australia during the 1990/91 tour (Australia won by three runs). Another fine moment with the bat was in a last-wicket second-innings stand with Robert Croft to save the Third Test at Old Trafford against South Africa in 1998. According to the recollection of then England coach David Lloyd, as Fraser went out to face the bowling of Allan Donald, Fraser said :"‘The only way he'll get me out is if he knocks me through all three [stumps].’ I said: 'He probably will, Gus, but good luck'. But he survived. A red-inker it was and in retrospect one of the most important innings of the series". Fraser's short innings indeed helped to reverse the momentum in the series, Fraser taking three fivefers in the next two Tests to help England to an unlikely series victory. He also toured New Zealand and South Africa, and played in one-day tournaments in Asia, representing England.

Fraser last played for England during the 1999 Cricket World Cup. In total, Fraser played in forty-six Test matches and forty-two One Day Internationals for England. Cricket commentator Colin Bateman commented that Fraser was "a reliable, intelligent and hard-working bowler". He was awarded an MBE in the 1999 New Year Honours.

== Post-playing career ==
At the conclusion of his playing career, Fraser joined the editorial board at Wisden Cricket Monthly and worked as the cricket correspondent of The Independent newspaper (2002–2009), until his appointment to the newly created role of managing director of Cricket by Middlesex County Cricket Club in January 2009. He has been a contributor to the BBC's Test Match Special and a cricket pundit for Sky Sports.

Fraser served as the managing director of cricket at Middlesex County Cricket Club between 2009 and 2021. Middlesex won the 2016 County Championship during his spell in charge. He assumed a new role in heading the club's academy in July 2021. He is currently serving as managing director of the Middlesex in the Community charity.

He combined his Middlesex role with that as a selector for the England cricket team for a period from 2014.

== Personal life ==
Fraser resides in Pinner. He married Denise in 1996, after they had been a couple since 1989. They have two children, Alex (born 1993) and Bethan (born 1995).

His brother Alastair Fraser also played first-class cricket for Middlesex.

Sporting positions
Preceded by New position	Middlesex; Managing Director of Cricket; 2009-2021	Succeeded by N/A
Preceded by Justin Langer	Middlesex County Cricket Captain; 2001–2002	Succeeded by Andrew Strauss
