= Roger Miller (cricketer, born 1972) =

English cricketer (born 1972)

Personal information
- Full name: Roger Trevor Peter Miller
- Born: 23 October 1972 (age 54); Southampton, Hampshire, England
- Batting: Right-handed
- Bowling: Right-arm medium

Domestic team information
- Years: Team
- 1999–2002: Hampshire Cricket Board

Career statistics
Competition	List A
Matches	8
Runs scored	128
Batting average	21.33
100s/50s	0/0
Top score	34
Balls bowled	396
Wickets	8
Bowling average	36.37
5 wickets in innings	0
10 wickets in match	0
Best bowling	3/26
Catches/stumpings	2/–
- Source: Cricinfo, 29 December 2009

Roger Trevor Peter Miller (born 23 October 1972) is a former English cricketer. Miller was a right-handed batsman who bowled right-arm medium pace.

Miller made his List A debut for the Hampshire Cricket Board against Suffolk, in 1999. From 1999 to 2002 Miller represented the Board eight times, with his last List-A match coming against Staffordshire in the 2nd Round of the 2003 Cheltenham & Gloucester Trophy which was played in 2002.

Miller took eight wickets for the Board at a bowling average of 36.37, with best figures of 3/26. With the bat Miller scored 128 runs at an average of 21.33, with a best score of 34.

Between 1992 and 1997 Miller represented the Hampshire Second XI in the Second Eleven Championship eight times.
