= Andrew Clarke (cricketer, born 1961) =

English cricketer (born 1961)

Personal information
- Full name: Andrew Russell Clarke
- Born: 23 December 1961 (age 64); Patcham, Sussex, England
- Batting: Right-handed
- Bowling: Leg break

Domestic team information
- Years: Team
- 1988–1990: Sussex
- 1994–1999: Buckinghamshire
- 2000: Norfolk
- 2001–2003: Buckinghamshire

Career statistics
Competition	First-class	List A
Matches	26	55
Runs scored	406	60
Batting average	14.50	3.52
100s/50s	0/1	0/0
Top score	68	24
Balls bowled	4,194	2,730
Wickets	53	72
Bowling average	35.32	26.93
5 wickets in innings	2	1
10 wickets in match	0	0
Best bowling	5/60	5/36
Catches/stumpings	7/–	10/–
- Source: Cricinfo, 4 June 2011

Andrew Russell Clarke (born 23 December 1961) is a former English cricketer. Clarke was a right-handed batsman who bowled leg break. He was born in Patcham, Sussex. A late starter to county cricket, not making his debut for Sussex until he was 26, Clarke played for Sussex for 3 seasons. He later played Minor counties cricket for Buckinghamshire and Norfolk, before retiring in 2003.

== Sussex ==
Clarke initially played a Second XI Championship fixture for Sussex in 1981 against the Second XI of Hampshire, but made no further appearances for the Sussex Second XI for some while following that fixture. He did though play club cricket in Brighton, while working as an insurance underwriter. However, in 1987 he had trials at Sussex, where he again played Second XI cricket for the Sussex Second XI. The trial turned out to be a success for Clarke, with Sussex signing following which he took a sabbatical from his job. His late start in county cricket, at the age of 26, was all the more remarkable considering that his bowling style was virtually considered an extinct form in England.

His first-class debut followed in the 1988 County Championship against Somerset, with his List A debut also coming in 1988 against the same opposition in the Refuge Assurance League. Clarke played 3 seasons for Sussex, appearing regularly in the Sussex team for first-class matches, before falling out of favour during the 1989 and 1990 seasons. He did though make a total of 26 first-class appearances in the 2 seasons in which he appeared in first-class cricket, with 21 coming in his debut season. A tailender, Clarke scored 406 runs at a batting average of 14.50. He scored a single half century, making 68 against in a rearguard action against Hampshire in 1988. Clarkes primary role was as a bowler, with Clarke taking 53 first-class wickets, at a respectable bowling average of 35.32. He twice took a five wicket haul, with the best of these coming against Hampshire in 1988, the match in which his highest score with the bat came.

Clarke was used by Sussex more in limited-overs cricket; he played List A cricket in all 3 of his seasons with the county, making 44 appearances. He was more successful in List A matches for with the ball for Sussex, taking 53 wickets – the same total as he took in first-class cricket – although coming at a better average of 28.52. His best figures for Sussex came against Glamorgan in the 1988 Refuge Assurance League. Having played just 5 first-class matches in 1989, and solely List A cricket for remainder of that season and for the entirety of the 1990 season, he was released by the county at the end of that season.

== Minor counties ==
He appeared once for the Second XI of Derbyshire in 1992, against the Second XI of Yorkshire. His trial with Derbyshire was not successful, with the county not pursuing their interest in him. He joined Buckinghamshire in 1994, making his debut for the county in the 1994 Minor Counties Championship against Northumberland. His debut in the MCCA Knockout Trophy came in the same season, against Berkshire in the competition's quarter-final. However, at this time Buckinghamshire were permitted to take part in the NatWest Trophy with the first-class counties. He made his first appearance for the county in the List A format against Essex in the 1997 NatWest Trophy. In his first stint with the county, he played a further 2 List A matches: against the Yorkshire Cricket Board and Warwickshire, both in the 1999 NatWest Trophy.

He left Buckinghamshire for Norfolk in 2000, making 9 Minor Counties Championship appearances and 4 MCCA Knockout Trophy matches. Clarke also played 2 List A matches in his sole season with Norfolk, both coming in the 2000 NatWest Trophy against Cornwall and Dorset, taking 2 wickets at an average of 28.50. Clarke returned to Buckinghamshire after his sole season with Norfolk. He played Minor counties cricket for Buckinghamshire until 2003, making 15 further Minor Counties Championship appearances, bringing the total amount he played for Buckinghamshire to 62. He also made a total of 15 MCCA Knockout Trophy matches for the county. His return to Buckinghamshire brought him some success in List A cricket. He made 6 further appearances for the county, that last coming against Gloucestershire in the 2003 Cheltenham & Gloucester Trophy. This competition was his most successful, with Clarke ending it as the competition's leading wicket-taker with 11. His best figures in List A cricket came during this competition, when he took 5/36 against Suffolk. In total, Clarke played 9 List A matches for Buckinghamshire, taking 17 wickets at an average of 21.76. He retired from county cricket following the 2003 season.
