= Carlos Remy =

Personal information
- Full name: Carlos Charles Remy
- Born: 24 July 1968 (age 58); Castries, Saint Lucia
- Batting: Right-handed
- Bowling: Right-arm medium

Domestic team information
- Years: Team
- 2000-2001: Middlesex Cricket Board
- 1996: Leicestershire
- 1989-1995: Sussex

Career statistics
Competition	FC	LA
Matches	22	50
Runs scored	480	284
Batting average	18.46	8.11
100s/50s	–/2	–/–
Top score	60	28
Balls bowled	1,637	1,606
Wickets	19	40
Bowling average	55.31	33.37
5 wickets in innings	–	–
10 wickets in match	–	–
Best bowling	4/63	4/31
Catches/stumpings	7/–	11/–
- Source: Cricinfo, 19 November 2010

Carlos Charles Remy (born 24 July 1968) is a Saint Lucian born former English cricketer. Remy was a right-handed batsman who bowled right-arm medium pace. He was born in Castries, Saint Lucia.

Remy made his first-class debut for Sussex against Hampshire in the 1989 County Championship. From 1989 to 1995, he represented the county in 21 first-class matches, the last of which came against Derbyshire. In his 21 first-class matches for Sussex, he scored 480 runs at a batting average of 18.46, with 2 half centuries and a high score of 60. In the field he took 7 catches. With the ball he took 19 wickets at a bowling average of 55.31, with best figures of 4/63. It was for Sussex that he made his debut in List A cricket against the touring Zimbabweans in 1990. From 1990 to 1995, he represented the county in 32 List A matches, the last of which came against Ireland in the Benson and Hedges Cup.

Following the 1995 season, Remy joined Leicestershire. In the 1996 season, he played a single first-class match against Oxford University. Remy also played 15 List A matches for Leicestershire in 1996, with his final appearance for the county in that format coming against Nottinghamshire in the 1996 AXA Equity and Law League. The 1996 season was Remy's only season with the county.

In 2000, he represented the Middlesex Cricket Board in 2 List A matches against Wiltshire and Sussex in the 2000 NatWest Trophy, as well as one further match for the Board against Berkshire in the 2001 Cheltenham & Gloucester Trophy. In his career total of 50 List A matches, he scored 284 runs at an average of 8.11, with a high score of 28. In the field he took 11 catches, while with the ball he took 40 wickets at an average of 33.37, with best figures of 4/31.
