= Ross Wood =

English cricket umpire

Personal information
- Born: 25 September 1941
- Died: 2 December 2020 (aged 79)
- Relatives: Julian Wood (son)

Umpiring information
- LA umpired: 7 (1999–2003)

Ross Wood (25 September 1941 – 2 December 2020) was an English cricket umpire from Basingstoke, Hampshire. Wood first stood in county cricket in a match between Buckinghamshire and Berkshire in the 1991 Minor Counties Championship. He would stand in a further 41 Minor Counties Championship matches, the last of which was in a match between Oxfordshire and Devon in the 2002 Minor Counties Championship. He also stood in twelve MCCA Knockout Trophy matches from 1996 to 2002. He first stood in a match which held List A status when Hertfordshire played the Leicestershire Cricket Board in the 1999 NatWest Trophy. He stood in six further List A matches, the last of which was between the Hampshire Cricket Board and Staffordshire in the 2003 Cheltenham & Gloucester Trophy.

His son, Julian, played first-class cricket for Hampshire.
