= Richard Hignett =

English cricketer (born 1972)

Personal information
- Full name: Richard Graeme Hignett
- Born: 29 April 1972 (age 54); Widnes, Lancashire, England
- Batting: Right-handed
- Bowling: Right-arm fast-medium

Domestic team information
- Years: Team
- 1995–1998: Minor Counties
- 1992–2003: Cheshire

Career statistics
Competition	List A
Matches	19
Runs scored	525
Batting average	30.88
100s/50s	–/6
Top score	84
Balls bowled	259
Wickets	13
Bowling average	19.84
5 wickets in innings	–
10 wickets in match	–
Best bowling	3/21
Catches/stumpings	4/–
- Source: Cricinfo, 13 April 2011

Richard Graeme Hignett (born 29 April 1972) is a former English cricketer. Hignett was a right-handed batsman who bowled right-arm fast-medium. He was born in Widnes, Lancashire.

Hignett made his debut for Cheshire in the 1992 Minor Counties Championship against Shropshire. Hignett played Minor counties cricket for Cheshire from 1992 to 2003, including 83 Minor Counties Championship matches and 30 MCCA Knockout Trophy matches. In 1993, he made his List A debut against Nottinghamshire in the NatWest Trophy. He played 13 further List A matches for Cheshire, the last coming against Bedfordshire in the 1st round of the 2004 Cheltenham & Gloucester Trophy which was held in 2004. In his 14 List A matches for Cheshire, he scored 473 runs at a batting average of 36.38, with six half centuries and a high score of 84, which came against Lincolnshire in the 2nd round of the 2003 Cheltenham & Gloucester Trophy which was played in 2002. With the ball he took 8 wickets at a bowling average of 21.25, with best figures of 3/21.

Hignett also represented the Minor Counties cricket team in List A matches in the Benson and Hedges Cup, starting in 1995 against Durham. He played four further fixtures for the team, with his last appearance for them coming in the 1998 competition against Warwickshire. In total, he played 19 List A matches. In these he scored 525 runs at an average of 30.88, with a high score of 84. With the ball he took 13 wickets at an average of 19.84, with best figures of 3/21, which came against Huntingdonshire in the 1st round of the 2003 Cheltenham & Gloucester Trophy which was played in 2002.

He has played Second XI cricket for the Essex Second XI and the Nottinghamshire Second XI.
