= Neil Sargeant =

English cricketer

Personal information
- Full name: Neil Fredrick Sargeant
- Born: 8 November 1965 (age 61); Hammersmith, London, England
- Batting: Right-handed
- Role: Wicketkeeper

Domestic team information
- Years: Team
- 2000: Middlesex Cricket Board
- 1989–1995: Surrey

Career statistics
Competition	FC	LA
Matches	52	17
Runs scored	786	70
Batting average	14.03	10.00
100s/50s	–/–	–/–
Top score	49	22
Balls bowled	30	–
Wickets	1	–
Bowling average	88.00	–
5 wickets in innings	–	–
10 wickets in match	–	–
Best bowling	1/88	–
Catches/stumpings	121/16	13/–
- Source: Cricinfo, 18 November 2010

Neil Fredrick Sargeant (born 8 November 1965) is a former English cricketer. Sargeant was a right-handed batsman who played primarily as a wicketkeeper. He was born in Hammersmith, London.

Sargeant made his first-class debut for Surrey against Gloucestershire in the 1989 County Championship. From 1989 to 1995, he represented the county in 52 first-class matches, the last of which came against Hampshire. In his 52 first-class, he scored 786 runs at a batting average of 14.03, with high score of 49. In the field and behind the stumps, he took 121 catches and made 16 stumpings.

It was for Surrey that he made his debut in List A cricket against Kent in the 1990 Refuge Assurance League. From 1990 to 1995, he represented the county in 15 List A matches, the last of which came against Hampshire in the 1995 AXA Equity and Law League. For much of his time at Surrey, Sargeant acted as Alec Stewarts' understudy, thus limiting his appearances for the county. On many an occasion he covered for Stewart while he was playing for England. At the end of the 1995 season he left Surrey.

Five years later he represented the Middlesex Cricket Board in 2 List A matches against Wiltshire and Sussex in the 2000 NatWest Trophy. During his career, Sargeant played a total of 17 List A matches. In these he scored 70 runs at an average of 10.00, with a high score of 20. Behind the stumps he took 13 catches.
