= Tom Simpson (cricketer) =

English cricketer

Personal information
- Full name: Thomas Andrew Simpson
- Born: 7 November 1974 (age 52); Hampstead, London, England
- Batting: Left-handed

Domestic team information
- Years: Team
- 2000: Middlesex Cricket Board

Career statistics
| Competition | List A |
|---|---|
| Matches | 1 |
| Runs scored | 3 |
| Batting average | 3.00 |
| 100s/50s | 0/0 |
| Top score | 3 |
| Catches/stumpings | 0/– |
- Source: Cricinfo, 19 November 2010

Thomas Andrew Simpson (born 7 November 1974) is an English cricketer. Simpson is a left-handed batsman. He was born in Hampstead, London and later educated at Eton College, where he captained first team cricket for two years running.

Simpson represented the Middlesex Cricket Board in a single List A match against Wiltshire in the 2000 NatWest Trophy. In his only List A match he scored 3 runs.

He currently plays club cricket for Brondesbury Cricket Club in the Middlesex County Cricket League.
