= Steven Knox =

English-born Scottish cricketer (born 1974)

Personal information
- Born: 16 February 1974 (age 52); Barrow-in-Furness, Lancashire, England
- Batting: Right-handed
- Bowling: Right-arm medium
- Role: Batsman

International information
- National side: Scotland (2003–2007)

Head coaching information
- Years: Team
- 2014–2013: Germany Men
- 2016–2020: Scotland Women
- Source: Cricinfo, 12 July 2023

Steven Thomas Knox (born 16 February 1974) is an English cricket coach and former player. He played for the Scotland national cricket team from 2003 to 2007 after meeting residency qualifications, and also played minor counties cricket for Cumberland. He has coached the Scotland women's national cricket team and the Germany men's national cricket team.

== Personal life ==
Knox was born on 16 February 1974 in Barrow-in-Furness, Lancashire, England.

== Playing career ==
=== Domestic career ===
A right-handed opening batsman, Knox played for Cumberland County Cricket Club in the Minor Counties Championship between 1994 and 2009. He also played several List A matches for Cumberland, notably scoring 108 not out in a victory against Nottinghamshire Cricket Board in the 2003 Cheltenham & Gloucester Trophy.

Knox also played club cricket for Penicuik Cricket Club and Heriot's Cricket Club in Scotland and for St Albans Cricket Club in Christchurch, New Zealand.

=== International career ===
In 2003, Knox became eligible to play international cricket for Scotland after playing seven years of Scottish club cricket. He debuted for Scotland in the same year and played most of his matches for Scotland against English counties in the National League.

Knox played four ICC Intercontinental Cup matches for Scotland, debuting against Netherlands in 2004 and concluding against Ireland in 2007. He was named in Scotland's preliminary 24-man squad for the 2005 international season, but failed to make the final 14-man squad for the 2005 ICC Trophy.

== Coaching career ==
In January 2014, Knox was appointed head coach of the Germany national cricket team. He continued to coach Germany on a part-time basis until February 2023. His tenure included back-to-back titles at 2016 ICC Europe Division Two and 2017 ICC Europe Division One, which saw Germany progress to 2017 ICC World Cricket League Division Five. In Twenty20 International cricket, Germany narrowly lost to Jersey on net run rate at the 2019 European qualifier. At the 2021 qualifier the team narrowly defeated Italy on net run rate to qualify for its first global qualifier, the 2022 ICC Men's T20 World Cup Global Qualifier A.

In 2016, Knox was named as head of the Scotland women's national cricket team, taking over from Kari Carswell.
