= Glyn Treagus =

English cricketer

Personal information
- Full name: Glyn Robert Treagus
- Born: 10 December 1974 (age 51); Rustington, Sussex, England
- Batting: Right-handed
- Bowling: Right-arm medium

Domestic team information
- Years: Team
- 2000–present: Dorset

Career statistics
Competition	LA
Matches	7
Runs scored	104
Batting average	17.33
100s/50s	–/1
Top score	76
Balls bowled	233
Wickets	1
Bowling average	220.00
5 wickets in innings	–
10 wickets in match	–
Best bowling	1/44
Catches/stumpings	–/–
- Source: Glyn Treagus at Cricinfo, 20 March 2010

Glyn Robert Treagus (born 10 December 1974) is an English cricketer. Treagus is a right-handed batsman who bowls right-arm medium pace.

As a schoolboy in 1993, Treagus scored 1613 runs for his school, King Edward VI in Southampton. Amazingly, he was pipped to the post by Iain Sutcliffe, who scored 1623 for Leeds Grammar School. They remain the only two schoolboys to have scored more than 1600 runs in a season.

In 2000, Treagus made his List-A debut and his debut for Dorset against Norfolk in the 2nd round of the 2000 NatWest Trophy. From 2000 to 2004, Treagus represented Dorset in 7 List-A matches, with his final List-A match for the county coming against Yorkshire in the 2nd round of the 2004 Cheltenham & Gloucester Trophy.

In his 7 List-A matches for Dorset he scored 104 runs at a batting average of 17.33, with a single half century high score of 76 against the Worcestershire Cricket Board in the 1st round of the 2003 Cheltenham & Gloucester Trophy which was played in 2002.

In the same season he made his List-A debut, Treagus also made his debut for Dorset in the Minor Counties Championship against Herefordshire in 2000. From 2000 to present, Treagus has played 56 Minor County matches for Dorset, including in the final of the 2000 Minor Counties Championship against Cumberland which Dorset won by 5 wickets.
