= Luke Stoughton =

English cricketer (born 1977)

Personal information
- Full name: Luke Robert Francis Stoughton
- Born: 6 September 1977 (age 49); Hammersmith, London, England
- Batting: Right-handed

Domestic team information
- Years: Team
- 2001: Middlesex Cricket Board
- 2008–2011: Wiltshire

Career statistics
Competition	List A
Matches	1
Runs scored	2
Batting average	2.00
100s/50s	–/–
Top score	2
Catches/stumpings	–/–
- Source: Cricinfo, 28 June 2019

Luke Robert Francis Stoughton (born 6 September 1977) is an English former cricketer.

Stoughton was born at Hammersmith in September 1977. He made a single appearance in List A one-day cricket for the Middlesex Cricket Board against Scotland at Southgate in the 1st round of the 2002 Cheltenham & Gloucester Trophy (played in August 2001). Opening the batting, he was dismissed by Damien Wright for 2 runs. In that same season he made three appearances for the Middlesex Cricket Board in the MCCA Knockout Trophy. He later played minor counties cricket for Wiltshire between 2008–11, making one appearance in the MCCA Knockout Trophy and five appearances in the Minor Counties Championship.
