= Ricky Fay =

English cricketer

Personal information
- Full name: Richard Anthony Fay
- Born: 14 June 1975 (age 51); Kilburn, London, England
- Batting: Right-handed
- Bowling: Right-arm medium

Domestic team information
- Years: Team
- 2000: Middlesex Cricket Board
- 1995–1997: Middlesex

Career statistics
| Competition | FC | LA |
|---|---|---|
| Matches | 16 | 31 |
| Runs scored | 164 | 61 |
| Batting average | 7.45 | 8.71 |
| 100s/50s | –/– | –/– |
| Top score | 26 | 16 |
| Balls bowled | 2,178 | 1,362 |
| Wickets | 31 | 31 |
| Bowling average | 36.96 | 31.22 |
| 5 wickets in innings | – | – |
| 10 wickets in match | – | – |
| Best bowling | 4/53 | 4/33 |
| Catches/stumpings | 5/– | 5/– |
- Source: Cricinfo, 19 November 2010

Richard Anthony Fay (born 14 May 1974) is an English former cricketer. Fay was a right-handed batsman who bowled right-arm medium pace. He was born in Kilburn, London.

Fay made his first-class debut for Middlesex against Yorkshire in the 1995 County Championship. From 1995 to 1996, he represented the county in 16 first-class matches, the last of which came against Leicestershire. In his 16 first-class, he scored 164 runs at a batting average of 7.45, with high score of 26. In the field he took 5 catches. With the ball he took 31 wickets at a bowling average of 36.96, with best figures of 4/53.

It was for Middlesex that he made his debut in List A cricket against Surrey in the 1995 AXA Equity and Law League. From 1995 to 1997, he represented the county in 28 List A matches, the last of which came against Nottinghamshire in the 1997 AXA Life League. In his 28 matches for the county, he took 29 wickets at a bowling average of 31.20, with best figures of 4/33. Fay left Middlesex at the end of the 1997 season.

In 2000, he represented the Middlesex Cricket Board in 2 List A matches against Wiltshire and Sussex in the 2000 NatWest Trophy.
