= Chris Tetley =

English cricketer (born 1974)

Personal information
- Full name: Christopher Mark Bagshaw Tetley
- Born: 13 September 1974 (age 52); Worcester, Worcestershire, England
- Nickname: Badger
- Batting: Left-handed
- Bowling: Leg-break

Domestic team information
- Years: Team
- 2001: Middlesex Cricket Board

Career statistics
Competition	LA
Matches	1
Runs scored	1
Batting average	1.00
100s/50s	–/–
Top score	1
Balls bowled	60
Wickets	–
Bowling average	–
5 wickets in innings	–
10 wickets in match	–
Best bowling	–
Catches/stumpings	–/–
- Source: Cricinfo, 18 November 2010

Christopher 'Chris' Mark Bagshaw Tetley (born 13 September 1974) is a former English cricketer. Tetley was a left-handed batsman who bowled leg break. He was born in Worcester, Worcestershire and later educated at the Royal Grammar School Worcester.

Tetley represented the Middlesex Cricket Board in a single List A match against Scotland in the 1st round of the 2002 Cheltenham & Gloucester Trophy which was held in 2001. In his only List A match he scored a single run and with the ball he bowled 10 wicket-less overs.
