= Tom Lambert (cricketer) =

English cricketer

Personal information
- Full name: Thomas Luke Lambert
- Born: 9 May 1981 (age 45); Ascot, Berkshire, England
- Batting: Right-handed
- Bowling: Right-arm fast medium

Domestic team information
- Years: Team
- 1999-2011 Cardiff UCCE 2000–2003 MCCA 2005–2008: Berkshire

Career statistics
Competition	LA
Matches	7
Runs scored	24
Batting average	12.00
100s/50s	–/–
Top score	18*
Balls bowled	336
Wickets	9
Bowling average	23.00
5 wickets in innings	–
10 wickets in match	–
Best bowling	2/19
Catches/stumpings	1/–
- Source: Cricinfo, 23 September 2010

Thomas Luke Lambert (born 9 May 1981) is an English cricketer. Lambert is a right-handed batsman who bowls right-arm fast medium pace. He was born at Ascot, Berkshire.

Lambert made his Minor Counties Championship debut for Berkshire in 1999 against Cheshire. From 1999 to 2011, he represented the county in 45 Minor Counties Championship matches, winning the Championship once as a player against Eastern Division champions Lincolnshire in 2008. Lambert also played 28 matches in the MCCA Knockout Trophy for Berkshire, winning it as a player in 2004 against Northumberland and 2011 against Hertfordshire in his final game for the county. His debut in the Trophy competition came in 2001 when Berkshire played Dorset.

In 2013 he took over as 1st XI head coach where he has gone on to win the championship in 2016, 2017, 2018, 2019, 2022 and a shared title with Staffordshire in 2024. As coach he also won the KO trophy in 2013, 2017, 2019, 2021, 2022 and 2023. In addition to this Lambert led Berkshire to the Minor Counties T20 national title in 2018. In all over 20 seasons with Berkshire Lambert has won 23 titles with the royal county as player and coach.

Between 2001 and 2005 he represented the county in 7 List-A matches, making his debut against the Middlesex Cricket Board in the 2001 Cheltenham & Gloucester Trophy and his last appearance against Gloucestershire in the 2005 Cheltenham & Gloucester Trophy. In List-A matches he took 9 wickets at a bowling average of 23.00, with best figures of 2/19 and scored 24 runs at a batting average of 12.00, with a high score of 18*.

In November 2019 he was awarded the ECB Coach Of The Year award.

In September 2021 he led an England XI at the T10 European Championships in Malaga, Spain. The squad returned home as champions two weeks later beating Belgium in the final by 10 wickets. A year later in 2022 the squad returned to Malaga to defend their title but fell short ending runners up to the Netherlands in the final by 4 wickets. In 2023 the team regained their European title by avenging their defeat by the Netherlands to win the title for the 2nd time in three years. In 2024 they became the first team to retain the title by once again defeating the Netherlands by 12 runs for a third European title.

In January 2024 he became head coach of the NCCA Challengers.

Playing Titles:

Western Division Title: 2008

NCCA County Championship Title: 2008

NCCA Trophy Title: 2004, 2011

Coaching Titles:

NCCA Western Division Title: 2016, 2017, 2018, 2019, 2022, 2024

NCCA County Championship Title: 2016, 2017, 2018, 2019, 2022, 2024 (shared)

NCCA Trophy Title: 2013, 2017, 2019, 2021, 2022, 2023

NCCA T20 Title 2018

ECC European Championship Title: 2021, 2023, 2024
