= Peter Wellings =

English cricketer

Personal information
- Full name: Peter Edward Wellings
- Born: 5 March 1970 (age 56); Wolverhampton, Staffordshire, England
- Nickname: Coach Wello
- Batting: Right-handed
- Bowling: Right-arm medium

Domestic team information
- Years: Team
- 2001–2002: Middlesex Cricket Board
- 1998–2000: Staffordshire
- 1996–1997: Middlesex

Career statistics
Competition	FC	LA
Matches	6	20
Runs scored	378	357
Batting average	47.25	23.80
100s/50s	1/–	–/2
Top score	128*	60
Balls bowled	18	285
Wickets	–	11
Bowling average	–	22.18
5 wickets in innings	–	–
10 wickets in match	–	–
Best bowling	–	2/9
Catches/stumpings	2/–	7/–
- Source: Cricinfo, 18 November 2010

Peter Edward Wellings (born 5 March 1970) is a former English cricketer. Wellings was a right-handed batsman who bowled right-arm medium pace. He was born at Wolverhampton, Staffordshire. After leaving Middlesex CCC, he has spent over 25 years coaching youngsters. He is an ECB Level III coach and has coached in various countries around the world, such as England, India, South Africa and the USA. He is known as "Coach Wello," by his students, and is known for his emphasis of fielding and fitness in his students. He currently resides in England.

== Middlesex ==
Wellings made his first-class debut for Middlesex against Kent in the County Championship. From 1996 to 1997, he represented the county in 6 first-class matches, the last of which came against Sussex. He played with international players such as Mark Ramprakash and Mike Gatting. In his 6 first-class, he scored 378 runs at a batting average of 47.25, with a single century high score of 128*. In the field he took 2 catches.

It was for Middlesex that Wellings made his debut in List A cricket against Gloucestershire in the 1996 AXA Equity and Law League. From 1996 to 1997, he represented the county in 12 List A matches, the last of which came against Essex in the 1997 AXA Life League. At the end of the 1997 season he was released by the county.

== Staffordshire and later career ==
The following season, he debuted for his home county Staffordshire in the Minor Counties Championship against Lincolnshire. During the 1998 season, he represented the county in 9 Championship matches, the last of which came against Dorset. It was in 1998 that he made his debut for the county in the MCCA Knockout Trophy against Oxfordshire. From 1998 to 1999, he represented the county in 4 Trophy matches, the last of which came against Oxfordshire.

It was in the 1998 NatWest Trophy that he made his debut for Staffordshire in List A cricket against Leicestershire. From 1998 to 2000, he represented the county in 4 Trophy matches, the last of which came against Devon in the 2000 NatWest Trophy.

The following year he made his debut in that format for the Middlesex Cricket Board against Berkshire in the 2001 Cheltenham & Gloucester Trophy. From 2001 to 2002, he represented the Board in 4 List A matches, the last of which came against Cambridgeshire in the 2nd round of the 2003 Cheltenham & Gloucester Trophy which was held in 2002.

During his career, Wellings played a total of 20 List A matches. In these he scored 357 runs at an average of 23.80, with 2 half centuries and a high score of 60. In the field he took 7 catches, while with the ball he took 11 wickets at a bowling average of 22.18, with best figures of 2/9.
