= Mark Currie (cricketer) =

English cricketer (born 1979)

Personal information
- Full name: Mark Robert Currie
- Born: 22 September 1979 (age 47); Manchester, England
- Batting: Right-handed
- Bowling: Right-arm off break

Domestic team information
- Years: Team
- 2002–2003: Lancashire
- 1999–2005: Cheshire

Career statistics
Competition	First-class	List A
Matches	3	6
Runs scored	216	145
Batting average	54.00	29.00
100s/50s	–/2	–/1
Top score	97	94
Balls bowled	–	–
Wickets	–	–
Bowling average	–	–
5 wickets in innings	–	–
10 wickets in match	–	–
Best bowling	–	–
Catches/stumpings	3/–	1/–
- Source: Cricinfo, 8 April 2011

Mark Robert Currie (born 22 September 1979) is an English cricketer. Currie is a right-handed batsman who bowls right-arm off break. He was born in Manchester.

Currie made his debut for Cheshire in the 1999 Minor Counties Championship against Berkshire. He played Minor counties cricket for Cheshire from 1999 to 2005, including 18 Minor Counties Championship matches. and 7 MCCA Knockout Trophy matches. In 2001, he made his List A debut for Cheshire against Cornwall in the Cheltenham & Gloucester Trophy. In the same season he played another List A match against the same opposition, this time in the 2nd round of the 2002 Cheltenham & Gloucester Trophy which was played in 2001. His final List A appearance for Cheshire came in 2002, against Lincolnshire in the 2nd round of the 2003 Cheltenham & Gloucester Trophy which was played in 2002.

In 2002, Currie made his first-class debut for Lancashire against West Indies A. The following season he played two further first-class matches, against Durham UCCE and his only County Championship appearance, against Surrey. In those three matches, he scored 216 runs at a batting average of 54.00, with two half centuries and a high score of 97. His highest first-class score came against Durham UCCE, with Currie being dismissed 3 short of his century by David Brown. His score of 97 came in a partnership of 215 with Alec Swann. In 2003, Currie played three List A matches for Lancashire against India A, Derbyshire and Sussex.

Currie played six List A matches in his career, scoring 145 runs at an average of 29.00, with a single half century high score of 94. This came for Cheshire against Lincolnshire. He has also played for the Lancashire Second XI.
