= Cordingly =

Cordingly is a surname. Notable people with the surname include:

- Beth Cordingly (born 1976), English actress
- David Cordingly (fl. 1992), English naval historian
- Eric Cordingly (1911–1976), British Anglican bishop

== See also ==
- Cordingley
