= Ian Boyton =

English cricketer (born 1974)

Personal information
- Full name: Ian Justin Boyton
- Born: 19 August 1974 (age 52); Barking, London, England
- Batting: Right-handed
- Bowling: Right-arm medium

Domestic team information
- Years: Team
- 2001: Middlesex Cricket Board

Career statistics
Competition	LA
Matches	1
Runs scored	31
Batting average	31.00
100s/50s	–/–
Top score	31
Balls bowled	24
Wickets	1
Bowling average	21.00
5 wickets in innings	–
10 wickets in match	–
Best bowling	1/21
Catches/stumpings	–/–
- Source: Cricinfo, 18 November 2010

Ian Justin Boyton (born 19 August 1974) is a former English cricketer. Boyton was a right-handed batsman who bowled right-arm medium pace. He was born in Barking, London.

Boyton represented the Middlesex Cricket Board in a single List A match against Scotland in the 1st round of the 2002 Cheltenham & Gloucester Trophy which was held in 2001. In his only List A match he scored 31 runs and with the ball he took a single wicket at a cost of 21 runs.
