= James Rodham =

English cricketer

Personal information
- Full name: James Paul Rodham
- Born: 23 March 1983 (age 43); Ashford, Surrey, England
- Batting: Right-handed
- Bowling: Right-arm off break

Domestic team information
- Years: Team
- 2002: Middlesex Cricket Board

Career statistics
Competition	LA
Matches	2
Runs scored	27
Batting average	13.50
100s/50s	0/0
Top score	23
Catches/stumpings	1/–
- Source: Cricinfo, 18 November 2010

James Paul Rodham (born 2 March 1983) is a former English cricketer. Rodham was a right-handed batsman who bowled right-arm off break. He was born in Ashford, Surrey.

Rodham represented the Middlesex Cricket Board in two List A matches against the Derbyshire Cricket Board and Cambridgeshire in the 1st and 2nd rounds of the 2003 Cheltenham & Gloucester Trophy which were held in 2002. In his 2 List A matches, he scored 27 runs at a batting average of 13.50, with a high score of 23. In the field he took a single catch. With the ball he took 4 wickets at a bowling average of 13.50, with best figures of 4/23.
