= Sully Centurions Cricket Club Ground =

Coordinates: 51.40324°N 3.21483°W

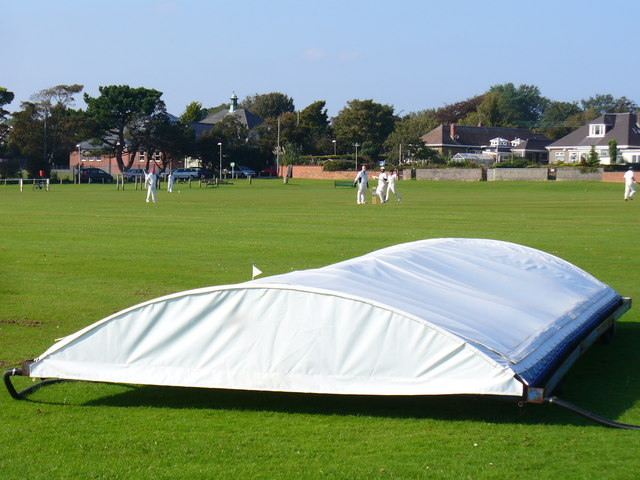

Ground information
- Location: Sully, Glamorgan
- Establishment: c. 1972

Team information
Wales Minor Counties	(2002)
- As of 11 September 2010; Source: Ground profile

Sully Centurions Cricket Club Ground is a cricket ground in Sully, Glamorgan. The first recorded match on the ground was in 2002, when Wales Minor Counties played Cornwall in a List-A match in the 2nd round of the 2003 Cheltenham & Gloucester Trophy which was played in 2002.

In 2003, the Glamorgan Second XI played the Gloucestershire Second XI in the Second XI Championship.

In local domestic cricket, the ground is the home venue of Sully Centurions Cricket Club who play in the South Wales Cricket League.
