= Chris Goldie =

South African-born English cricketer

Personal information
- Full name: Christopher Frederick Evelyn Goldie
- Born: 2 November 1960 (age 66); Johannesburg, Transvaal, South Africa
- Height: 5 ft 6 in (1.68 m)
- Batting: Right-handed
- Role: Wicket-keeper

Domestic team information
- Years: Team
- 1981–1982: Cambridge University
- 1983–1985: Hampshire
- 2001: Middlesex Cricket Board

Career statistics
Competition	First-class	List A
Matches	23	5
Runs scored	302	7
Batting average	14.38	2.33
100s/50s	–/1	–/–
Top score	77	3*
Catches/stumpings	35/9	2/–
- Source: Cricinfo, 12 December 2009

Christopher Frederick Evelyn Goldie (born 2 November 1960) is a South African-born English former cricketer.

Goldie was born at Johannesburg in November 1960. He was educated in England at St Paul's School in London, before matriculating to Pembroke College, Cambridge. There, he made his debut in first-class cricket as a wicket-keeper for Cambridge University against Essex at Fenner's in 1981. He made ten first-class appearances for Cambridge in 1981, including playing in The University Match against Oxford University at Lord's, gaining him a blue. He made his highest career score during the match, scoring 77 runs as a nightwatchman. The occasion was not without controversy, as Anne Merewood, a 19-year-old first year student at Girton College was denied access to the pavilion to witness his innings, as at the time women were not permitted to enter the pavilion at Lord's. In the same season, he played for a combined Oxford and Cambridge Universities team against the touring Sri Lankans. The following season, he made a further nine first-class appearances for Cambridge and played once more in The University Match, gaining him his second blue. In nineteen first-class matches for Cambridge, he scored 285 runs at an average of 15.83, making one half century with a highest score of 77 runs. While studying at Cambridge, he made four appearances in List A one-day cricket for the Combined Universities in the 1982 Benson & Hedges Cup.

Goldie joined Hampshire in 1983, signing a two-year contract as reserve wicket-keeper to Bobby Parks. He made three appearances in first-class cricket for Hampshire, against the touring New Zealanders in 1983, the touring Sri Lankans in 1984, and Oxford University in 1985. He subsequently played for and captained Richmond Cricket Club in the Middlesex County Cricket League, with his role at the club later expanding when he became their press officer. Sixteen years after his last senior appearance, Goldie made a one-day appearance for the Middlesex Cricket Board against Scotland in the 1st round of the 2002 Cheltenham & Gloucester Trophy, which was played in August 2001.

Goldie later held various administrative roles with Middlesex. He joined the Middlesex board of directors in 2019, having also served numerous terms on the Middlesex executive committee and as chairman of both the Middlesex Cricket Trust and Richmond Cricket Club. Outside of cricket, Goldie spent over 25-years working in the not-for-profit sector. He began his career in the sector with SportsAid, firstly as the charity's fundraising manager and later its national director. In 2003, he became a fundraising consultant and helped raise £12 million to rebuild the Young Vic Theatre in London.
