= Asim Munir (cricketer) =

Pakistani cricketer

Personal information
- Full name: Asim Munir Butt
- Born: 24 October 1982 (age 44); Sialkot, Punjab, Pakistan
- Batting: Right-handed
- Bowling: Right-arm off break

Domestic team information
- Years: Team
- 1999/00–2002/03: Gujranwala
- 2001/02–2003/04: Sui Northern Gas Pipelines Limited
- 2002: Cumberland

Career statistics
Competition	First-class	List A
Matches	23	41
Runs scored	1,322	953
Batting average	42.64	26.47
100s/50s	4/4	2/4
Top score	157*	128*
Balls bowled	232	242
Wickets	3	8
Bowling average	53.66	29.50
5 wickets in innings	0	0
10 wickets in match	0	0
Best bowling	1/7	4/44
Catches/stumpings	14/–	20/–
- Source: Cricinfo, 10 June 2011

Asim Munir Butt (born 24 October 1982) is a Pakistani former cricketer. Munir was a right-handed batsman who bowled right-arm off break. He was born in Sialkot, Punjab.

Munir made his debut for Gujranwala in a List A match in the 1998/99 Pakistani cricket season against Lahore City. The following season, he made his first-class debut for the team against Pakistan International Airlines. He played first-class and List-A cricket for the team until the 2002/03 season. Butt also played first-class and List-A cricket for Sui Northern Gas Pipelines Limited, who he represented from the 2001/02 season to the 2003/04 season. He additionally played List A cricket for the Pakistan Cricket Board Blues and Pakistan Emerging Players, in 2002/03 and 2003/04 respectively. He played county cricket in England on a single occasion, playing a List A match for Cumberland against Devon in the 2nd round of the 2003 Cheltenham & Gloucester Trophy, which was played in 2002.

Overall, Munir played 23 first-class matches. In these, he scored 1,322 runs at a batting average of 42.64, making 4 half centuries and 4 centuries. His highest score, an unbeaten 157, came against the Rest of Baluchistan in 2001/02. He took 3 wickets with the ball, coming at a bowling average of 53.66. In List A matches, he made 41 appearances. In these, he scored 953 runs at an average of 26.47, making 4 half centuries and 2 centuries. His highest score, an unbeaten 128, came against Multan in 2002/03. He took a total of 8 wickets with the ball, at an average of 29.50 and with best figures of 4/44.

Munir also played a number of Youth One Day Internationals for Pakistan Under-19s, making his debut against Sri Lanka Under-19s in 2001. He also played for Pakistan Under-19s in the 2002 Under-19 World Cup.
