= Paul Dancy =

English cricketer (born 1978)

Personal information
- Full name: Paul Antony John Dancy
- Born: 26 September 1978 (age 48); Farnborough, London, England
- Batting: Right-handed
- Bowling: Right-arm medium-fast

Domestic team information
- Years: Team
- 2001: Middlesex Cricket Board

Career statistics
Competition	LA
Matches	1
Runs scored	1
Batting average	1.00
100s/50s	–/–
Top score	1
Balls bowled	30
Wickets	1
Bowling average	39.00
5 wickets in innings	–
10 wickets in match	–
Best bowling	1/39
Catches/stumpings	–/–
- Source: Cricinfo, 18 November 2010

Paul Antony John Dancy (born 26 September 1978) is an English cricketer. Dancy is a right-handed batsman who bowls right-arm medium-fast. He was born in Farnborough, London. He went to Perry Hall Primary School in Orpington.

Dancy represented the Middlesex Cricket Board in a single List A match against Scotland in the 1st round of the 2002 Cheltenham & Gloucester Trophy which was held in 2001. In his only List A match he scored a single run and with the ball he took a single wicket at a cost of 39 runs.

He currently plays club cricket for Teddington Cricket Club in the Middlesex County Cricket League.
