= Mark Richards (cricketer) =

English cricketer

Personal information
- Full name: Mark Allan Elliott Richards
- Born: 9 April 1974 (age 52); Bridport, Dorset, England
- Batting: Right-handed
- Bowling: Right-arm medium

Domestic team information
- Years: Team
- 2002–2005: Devon

Career statistics
Competition	List A
Matches	3
Runs scored	11
Batting average	11.00
100s/50s	–/–
Top score	11*
Balls bowled	180
Wickets	6
Bowling average	19.33
5 wickets in innings	–
10 wickets in match	–
Best bowling	4/22
Catches/stumpings	–/–
- Source: Cricinfo, 1 February 2011

Mark Allan Elliott Richards (born 9 April 1974) is a former English cricketer. Richards is a right-handed batsman who bowls right-arm medium pace. He was born at Bridport, Devon.

Richards made his debut for Devon in the 2002 Minor Counties Championship against Wiltshire. He played three further Championship matches that season, the last of which came against Berkshire. In that same season he made his MCCA Knockout Trophy debut for Devon, which came against Dorset. He played four further Trophy matches that season, the last of which came against the Sussex Cricket Board.

2002 also saw him make his List A debut for Devon, against Yorkshire in the 3rd round of the 2002 Cheltenham & Gloucester Trophy. He played a further match in that format in 2002, against Cumberland in the 2nd round of the 2003 Cheltenham & Gloucester Trophy which was held in 2002. Three years later he played a final List A match for Devon against Essex at The Maer Ground in the 1st round of the 2005 Cheltenham & Gloucester Trophy. In his three List A matches, he took 6 wickets at a bowling average of 19.33, with best figures of 4/22.

Richards played two Second XI Championship matches for the Worcestershire Second XI in 2006.
