= David Manning (cricketer) =

English cricketer

Personal information
- Full name: David Manning
- Born: 9 March 1963 (age 63); Wolverhampton, Staffordshire, England
- Batting: Right-handed
- Bowling: Right-arm off break

Domestic team information
- Years: Team
- 1999–2003: Worcestershire Cricket Board

Career statistics
| Competition | LA |
|---|---|
| Matches | 8 |
| Runs scored | 169 |
| Batting average | 28.16 |
| 100s/50s | –/1 |
| Top score | 80 |
| Balls bowled | 107 |
| Wickets | 3 |
| Bowling average | 31.33 |
| 5 wickets in innings | – |
| 10 wickets in match | – |
| Best bowling | 2/12 |
| Catches/stumpings | 4/– |
- Source: Cricinfo, 3 November 2010

David Manning (born 9 March 1963) is a former English cricketer. Manning is a right-handed batsman who bowls right-arm off break. He was born at Wolverhampton, Staffordshire.

Manning represented the Worcestershire Cricket Board in List A cricket. His debut List A match came against the Kent Cricket Board in the 1999 NatWest Trophy. From 1999 to 2003, he represented the Board in 8 List A matches, the last of which came against Worcestershire in the 2003 Cheltenham & Gloucester Trophy. In his 8 List A matches, he scored 169 runs at a batting average of 28.16, with a single half century high score of 80. In the field he took 4 catches. In the field he took 3 wickets at a bowling average of 31.33, with best figures of 2/12.

He currently plays club cricket for Wolverhampton Cricket Club in the Birmingham and District Premier League.
