= Terry Rollock =

Barbadian cricketer

Personal information
- Full name: Terry Euclyn Rollock
- Born: 25 September 1969 (age 57); Saint Lucy, Barbados
- Batting: Right-handed
- Bowling: Leg break googly

Domestic team information
- Years: Team
- 1996/97–1997/98: Barbados
- 2003: Kent Cricket Board

Career statistics
Competition	First-class	List A
Matches	11	1
Runs scored	299	5
Batting average	19.93	5.00
100s/50s	0/1	0/0
Top score	54	5
Balls bowled	1,035	60
Wickets	21	1
Bowling average	23.95	28.00
5 wickets in innings	1	0
10 wickets in match	0	0
Best bowling	6/15	1/28
Catches/stumpings	7/–	0/–
- Source: Cricinfo, 12 November 2010

Terry Euclyn Rollock (born 25 September 1969) is a former Barbadian cricketer. Rollock was a right-handed batsman who bowled leg break googly. He was born at Saint Lucy, Barbados.

Rollock made his first-class debut for Barbados against Free State during the South African Provinces tour of the West Indies in 1996. From the 1996/97 season to the 1997/98 season, he represented Barbados in 11 first-class matches, the last of which came against Trinidad and Tobago. In his 11 first-class matches, he scored 299 runs at a batting average of 19.93, with a single half century high score 53. In the field he took 7 catches. With the ball he took 21 wickets at a bowling average of 23.95, with a single five wicket haul which gave him best figures of 6/15.

During the 2003 English cricket season, Rollock represented the Kent Cricket Board in a single List A match against Derbyshire in the 3rd round of the 2003 Cheltenham & Gloucester Trophy. In his only List A match, he scored 5 runs and took a single wicket at a cost of 28 runs.
