= Jonathan Davies (cricketer, born 1976) =

English cricketer

Personal information
- Full name: Jonathan Richard Davies
- Born: 9 March 1976 (age 50); Burnley, Lancashire, England
- Batting: Right-handed
- Bowling: Right-arm medium

Domestic team information
- Years: Team
- 2000–2005: Lincolnshire

Career statistics
Competition	List A
Matches	4
Runs scored	2
Batting average	–
100s/50s	–/–
Top score	2*
Balls bowled	216
Wickets	7
Bowling average	25.28
5 wickets in innings	–
10 wickets in match	–
Best bowling	3/40
Catches/stumpings	1/–
- Source: Cricinfo, 23 June 2011

Jonathan Richard Davies (born 9 March 1976) is a former English cricketer. Davies was a right-handed batsman who bowled right-arm medium pace. He was born in Burnley, Lancashire.

Davies made his debut for Lincolnshire in the 2000 MCCA Knockout Trophy against the Derbyshire Cricket Board. Davies played Minor counties cricket for Lincolnshire from 2000 to 2005, which included 17 Minor Counties Championship matches and 10 MCCA Knockout Trophy matches. He made his List A debut against Cheshire in the 2nd round of the 2003 Cheltenham & Gloucester Trophy which was played in 2002. He played 3 further List A matches for Lincolnshire, the last coming against Glamorgan in the 2004 Cheltenham & Gloucester Trophy. In his 4 matches, he took 7 wickets at an average of 25.28, with best figures of 3/40.
