= Leon Morgan =

English cricketer

Personal information
- Full name: Leon Neil Morgan
- Born: 14 February 1979 (age 47); Willesborough, Kent, England
- Batting: Right-handed

Domestic team information
- Years: Team
- 2001–2003: Kent Cricket Board

Career statistics
Competition	List A
Matches	3
Runs scored	66
Batting average	33.00
100s/50s	0/0
Top score	27
Catches/stumpings	1/–
- Source: Cricinfo, 12 November 2010

Leon Neil Morgan (born 14 February 1979) is an English former cricketer who played as a right-handed batsman. He was born at Willesborough in Kent in 1979.

Morgan represented the Kent Cricket Board in three List A matches. These came against the Leicestershire Cricket Board in the second round of the 2002 Cheltenham & Gloucester Trophy which was held in 2001, and against the same opposition in the second round of the 2003 Cheltenham & Gloucester Trophy which was held in 2002. His final List A match came against Derbyshire in the third round of the same competition which was played in 2003. In his three List A matches, he scored 66 runs at a batting average of 33.00, with a high score of 27. In the field he took a single catch.

He played club cricket for Folkestone Cricket Club in the Kent Cricket League.
