= Gary Neely =

Irish cricketer (born 1974)

Personal information
- Full name: Gary Jason Neely
- Born: 28 November 1974 (age 51); Derry, Northern Ireland
- Batting: Right-handed
- Bowling: Right-arm medium-fast

International information
- National side: Ireland

Domestic team information
- Years: Team
- 2000–2002: Ireland

Career statistics
Competition	First-class	List A
Matches	1	4
Runs scored	0	25
Batting average	0.00	–
100s/50s	0/0	0/0
Top score	0	17*
Balls bowled	50	144
Wickets	2	3
Bowling average	14.50	43.33
5 wickets in innings	0	0
10 wickets in match	0	0
Best bowling	2/29	3/40
Catches/stumpings	0/–	0/–
- Source: Cricinfo, 8 February 2019

Gary Jason Neely (born 28 November 1974) is a Northern Irish cricketer. He is a right-handed tailend batsman and a right-arm medium-fast bowler.

He made his debut for Ireland in 1997, and has gone on to represent his country 23 times to date including at the 2002 European Championship. His most recent match was in 2003. He also represented Northern Ireland in the cricket tournament at the 1998 Commonwealth Games.
