= Vernon Hill (cricketer, born 1978) =

English cricketer

Personal information
- Full name: Elliot Vernon Hill
- Born: 9 November 1978 (age 48); Birmingham, Warwickshire, England
- Batting: Left-handed
- Role: Wicketkeeper

Domestic team information
- Years: Team
- 2001: Middlesex Cricket Board

Career statistics
Competition	LA
Matches	1
Runs scored	3
Batting average	–
100s/50s	–/–
Top score	3*
Balls bowled	–
Wickets	–
Bowling average	–
5 wickets in innings	–
10 wickets in match	–
Best bowling	–
Catches/stumpings	–/1
- Source: Cricinfo, 18 November 2010

Elliot Vernon Hill (born 9 November 1978) is a former English cricketer. Hill was a left-handed batsman who played primarily as a wicketkeeper. He was born in Birmingham, Warwickshire.

Hill represented the Middlesex Cricket Board in a single List A match against Berkshire in the 2001 Cheltenham & Gloucester Trophy. In his only List A match he scored an unbeaten 3 runs and behind the stumps he made a single stumping.
