= Robert Pack (cricketer) =

English cricketer (born 1970)

Personal information
- Full name: Robert John Pack
- Born: 27 August 1970 (age 56); Kettering, Northamptonshire
- Batting: Left-handed
- Bowling: Slow left-arm orthodox

Domestic team information
- Years: Team
- 1998: Bedfordshire
- 1999—2000: Northamptonshire Cricket Board
- 2001—2002: Bedfordshire

Career statistics
Competition	List A
Matches	4
Runs scored	2
Batting average	—
100s/50s	0/0
Top score	2*
Balls bowled	202
Wickets	8
Bowling average	11.62
5 wickets in innings	0
10 wickets in match	0
Best bowling	3/1
Catches/stumpings	2/—
- Source: Cricinfo, 21 November 2010

Robert John Pack (born 27 August 1970) is a former English cricketer. Pack was a left-handed batsman who bowled slow left-arm orthodox. He was born at Kettering, Northamptonshire.

Pack made his debut in County Cricket for Bedfordshire in the 1998 Minor Counties Championship against Cumberland. He played 2 further championship matches for the county in 1998.

In 1999, he first represented the Northamptonshire Cricket Board, making his debut in List A for them against Wiltshire in the 1999 NatWest Trophy and playing one further match for the Board against Northumberland in the 2000 NatWest Trophy.

In 2001, he rejoined Bedfordshire. From 2001 to 2002, he has represented the county in 8 Championship matches, the last of which came against Cumberland. His debut for the county in the MCCA Knockout Trophy came against Cambridgeshire in 2002. During the 2002 season, he represented the county in 4 further Trophy matches, the last of which came against the Sussex Cricket Board.

During his second spell with the county, he represented Bedfordshire in 2 List A matches. These came against Hertfordshire in the 1st round of the 2003 Cheltenham & Gloucester Trophy which was played in 2002 and the Netherlands in the 2nd round of the same competition, also played in 2002.

In his career total of 3 List A matches, he took 8 wickets at a bowling average of 11.62, with best figures of 3/1.
