= Neil Pullen =

English cricketer

Personal information
- Full name: Neil Jon Pullen
- Born: 14 September 1977 (age 49); Leicester, Leicestershire, England
- Batting: Right-handed
- Bowling: Right-arm medium
- Role: Occasional Wicketkeeper

Domestic team information
- Years: Team
- 1999–2002: Leicestershire Cricket Board

Career statistics
Competition	LA
Matches	7
Runs scored	225
Batting average	37.50
100s/50s	–/2
Top score	88
Balls bowled	389
Wickets	21
Bowling average	12.71
5 wickets in innings	1
10 wickets in match	–
Best bowling	5/41
Catches/stumpings	5/–
- Source: Cricinfo, 17 November 2010

Neil Jon Pullen (born 14 September 1977) is an English cricketer. Pullen is a right-handed batsman who bowls right-arm medium pace and who occasionally plays as a wicketkeeper. He was born in Leicester, Leicestershire.

Pullen represented the Leicestershire Cricket Board in List A cricket. His debut List A match came against Hertfordshire in the 1999 NatWest Trophy. From 1999 to 2002, he represented the Board in 7 List A matches, the last of which came against the Kent Cricket Board in the 2nd round of the 2003 Cheltenham & Gloucester Trophy which was played in 2002.

In his 7 List A matches, he scored 225 runs at a batting average of 37.50, with 2 half centuries and a high score of 88. In the field he took 5 catches. With the ball he took 21 wickets at a bowling average of 12.71, with a single five wicket haul which gave him best figures of 5/41. He therefore finished his List A career with better batting and bowling averages than Sir Ian Botham.

He currently plays club cricket for Sileby Town CC in the Leicestershire Premier Cricket League.
