= Steve Cordingley =

English cricketer

Personal information
- Full name: Stephen Geoffrey Cordingley
- Born: 19 December 1981 (age 44); Hertford, Hertfordshire, England
- Batting: Right-handed

Domestic team information
- Years: Team
- 2001–2007: Hertfordshire

Career statistics
Competition	List A
Matches	3
Runs scored	127
Batting average	42.33
100s/50s	0/2
Top score	58
Catches/stumpings	0/–
- Source: Cricinfo, 8 June 2011

Stephen Geoffrey Cordingley (born 19 December 1981) is an English cricketer. Cordingley is a right-handed batsman. He was born in Hertford, Hertfordshire.

Cordingley made his debut for Hertfordshire in the 2001 Minor Counties Championship against Cambridgeshire. Cordingley played Minor counties cricket for Hertfordshire from 2001 to 2007, which included 18 Minor Counties Championship matches and 9 MCCA Knockout Trophy matches. He made his List A debut against Worcestershire in the 2001 Cheltenham & Gloucester Trophy. He made 2 further List A appearances for the county, against Bedfordshire in the 1st round of the 2003 Cheltenham & Gloucester Trophy which was played in 2002, and against Ireland in the 1st round of the 2004 Cheltenham & Gloucester Trophy, which was played in 2003. In his 3 List A matches, he scored 127 runs at an average of 42.33, while making 2 half centuries. Both his half centuries were scores of 58, coming against Bedfordshire and Ireland.
