= Chris Hunkin =

English cricketer (born 1980)

Personal information
- Full name: Christopher Andrew Hunkin
- Born: 14 December 1980 (age 45); St Austell, Cornwall, England
- Batting: Right-handed
- Bowling: Right-arm medium

Domestic team information
- Years: Team
- 2002-present: Cornwall
- 2000–2001: Somerset Cricket Board

Career statistics
Competition	LA
Matches	6
Runs scored	68
Batting average	17.00
100s/50s	–/–
Top score	30
Balls bowled	318
Wickets	6
Bowling average	43.00
5 wickets in innings	–
10 wickets in match	–
Best bowling	2/24
Catches/stumpings	1/–
- Source: Cricinfo, 17 October 2010

Christopher Andrew Hunkin (born 14 December 1980) is an English cricketer. Hunkin is a right-handed batsman who bowls right-arm medium pace. He was born at St Austell, Cornwall.

Hunkin made his debut in List A cricket for the Somerset Cricket Board against Staffordshire in the 2000 NatWest Trophy. He played one further List A match for the Board in the 2001 Cheltenham & Gloucester Trophy against Wales Minor Counties.

Hunkin made his Minor Counties Championship debut for Cornwall in 2002 against Berkshire. From 2002 to present, he has represented the county in 51 Minor Counties Championship matches. Hunkin has also represented Cornwall in the MCCA Knockout Trophy. His debut for the county in that competition came against Wiltshire in 2002. From 2002 to present, he has represented the county in 26 Trophy matches.

Hunkin has also represented Cornwall in List A matches. The first of these came against Cheshire in the 1st round of the 2002 Cheltenham & Gloucester Trophy which was played in 2001. From 2001 to 2003, he represented the county in 4 List A matches, the last of which came against the Netherlands in the 1st round of the 2004 Cheltenham & Gloucester Trophy which was held in 2003. In his career total of 6 List A matches, he scored 68 runs at a batting average of 17.00, with a high score of 30. With the ball he took 6 wickets at a bowling average of 43.00, with best figures of 2/24.
