= Richard Barlow (cricketer) =

English cricketer

Personal information
- Full name: Richard Guy Ross Barlow
- Born: 28 June 1972 (age 54); Epsom, Surrey, England
- Batting: Right-handed
- Bowling: Leg break

Domestic team information
- Years: Team
- 2001: Middlesex Cricket Board
- 1993–1997: Herefordshire

Career statistics
Competition	LA
Matches	2
Runs scored	17
Batting average	8.50
100s/50s	–/–
Top score	15
Balls bowled	–
Wickets	–
Bowling average	–
5 wickets in innings	–
10 wickets in match	–
Best bowling	–
Catches/stumpings	1/–
- Source: Cricinfo, 18 November 2010

Richard Guy Ross Barlow (born 28 June 1972) is a former English cricketer. Barlow was a right-handed batsman who bowled leg break. He was born at Epsom, Surrey.

Barlow made his Minor Counties Championship for Herefordshire against Dorset in 1993. From 1993 to 1997, he represented the county in 19 Championship matches, the last of which came against Berkshire. In 1996, he made his MCCA Knockout Trophy debut for the county against Wiltshire. From 1996 to 1997, he represented the county in 4 Trophy matches, the last of which came against Shropshire. In 1997, he made his debut in List A cricket for the county against Somerset in the 1997 NatWest Trophy.

Later, in 2001, he represented the Middlesex Cricket Board in a single List A match against Scotland in the 1st round of the 2002 Cheltenham & Gloucester Trophy which was held in 2001. In his 2 career List A match he scored 17 runs at a batting average of 8.50, with a high score of 15. In the field he took a single catch.
