= Martyn Dobson =

English cricketer (born 1982)

Personal information
- Full name: Martyn Colin Dobson
- Born: 28 May 1982 (age 44); Scunthorpe, Lincolnshire, England
- Batting: Right-handed
- Bowling: Right-arm off break

Domestic team information
- Years: Team
- 2002-present: Lincolnshire
- 2001: Northamptonshire Cricket Board

Career statistics
Competition	LA
Matches	4
Runs scored	159
Batting average	39.75
100s/50s	–/2
Top score	90
Balls bowled	144
Wickets	2
Bowling average	78.50
5 wickets in innings	–
10 wickets in match	–
Best bowling	1/50
Catches/stumpings	1/–
- Source: Cricinfo, 21 November 2010

Martyn Colin Dobson (born 28 May 1982) is an English cricketer. Dobson is a right-handed batsman who bowls right-arm off break. He was born at Scunthorpe, Lincolnshire.

Dobson initially represented the Northamptonshire Cricket Board in a single List A match against Northamptonshire in the 2001 Cheltenham & Gloucester Trophy.

In 2002, he joined Lincolnshire, making his Minor Counties Championship debut for the county against Staffordshire. From 2002 to present, he has represented the county in 49 Championship matches. His debut for the county in the MCCA Knockout Trophy came against the Nottinghamshire Cricket Board in 2002. From 2002 to present, he has represented the county in 28 Trophy matches.

Dobson also represented Lincolnshire in List A cricket when they were permitted to take part in the Cheltenham & Gloucester Trophy. His first List A match for the county came against Cheshire in the 2nd round of the 2003 Cheltenham & Gloucester Trophy which was played in 2002. He played 2 further List A matches for the county against Norfolk in the 1st round of the 2004 Cheltenham & Gloucester Trophy which was played in 2003 and against Glamorgan in the 2nd round of the same tournament, this time played in 2004.

In his career total of 4 List A matches, he scored 159 runs at a batting average of 39.75, with 2 half centuries and a high score of 90, while in the field he took a single catch. With the ball he took 2 wickets at a bowling average of 78.50, with best figures of 1/50.

Since October 2012 Dobson has been the Cricket Development Manager at Welbeck Colliery Cricket Club.
