= Jonathan Kent (cricketer) =

English cricketer

Personal information
- Full name: Jonathan Peter Kent
- Born: 3 September 1973 (age 53); Truro, Cornwall, England
- Batting: Left-handed
- Bowling: Right-arm medium
- Role: Occasional wicketkeeper

Domestic team information
- Years: Team
- 1991-2006: Cornwall

Career statistics
Competition	LA
Matches	11
Runs scored	201
Batting average	20.10
100s/50s	–/1
Top score	80
Balls bowled	256
Wickets	6
Bowling average	26.16
5 wickets in innings	–
10 wickets in match	–
Best bowling	3/21
Catches/stumpings	1/–
- Source: Cricinfo, 17 October 2010

Jonathan Peter Kent (born 3 September 1973) is an English former cricketer. Kent was a left-handed batsman who bowled right-arm medium pace and who occasionally fielded as a wicketkeeper. He was born at Truro, Cornwall.

Kent made his Minor Counties Championship debut for Cornwall in 1991 against Buckinghamshire. From 1991 to 2006, he represented the county in 72 Minor Counties Championship matches, the last of came match against Herefordshire. Kent also represented Cornwall in the MCCA Knockout Trophy. His debut in that competition came against Dorset in 1994. From 1994 to 2006, he represented the county in 24 Trophy matches, the last of which came against Wales Minor Counties.

Kent also represented Cornwall in List A cricket. His debut List A match came against Middlesex in the 1995 NatWest Trophy. From 1995 to 2003, he represented the county in 11 List A matches, the last of which came against the Netherlands in the 1st round of the 2004 Cheltenham & Gloucester Trophy which was played in 2003. In his 11 List A matches, he scored 201 runs at a batting average of 20.10, with a single half century high score of 80. In the field he took a single catch. With the ball he took 6 wickets at a bowling average of 26.16, with best figures of 3/21.
