= William Sneath =

English cricketer

Personal information
- Full name: William Edward Sneath
- Born: 26 April 1977 (age 49); Bedford, Bedfordshire
- Batting: Right-handed
- Bowling: Right-arm fast-medium

Domestic team information
- Years: Team
- 1997–2012: Bedfordshire

Career statistics
Competition	List A
Matches	10
Runs scored	6
Batting average	2.00
100s/50s	0/0
Top score	4
Balls bowled	486
Wickets	16
Bowling average	22.43
5 wickets in innings	0
10 wickets in match	0
Best bowling	4/38
Catches/stumpings	0/–
- Source: Cricinfo, 28 May 2011

William Edward Sneath (born 26 April 1977) is an English cricketer. Sneath is a right-handed batsman who bowls right-arm fast-medium. He was born in Bedford, Bedfordshire.

Sneath made his debut for Bedfordshire in the 1997 Minor Counties Championship against Cambridgeshire. Sneath has played Minor counties cricket for Bedfordshire from 1997 to present, which has included 46 Minor Counties Championship matches and 32 MCCA Knockout Trophy matches. He made his List A debut against the Somerset Cricket Board in the 2nd round of the 1999 NatWest Trophy. He played 9 further List A matches, the last coming against Cheshire in the 1st round of the 2004 Cheltenham & Gloucester Trophy, which was held in 2003. In his 10 matches, he took 16 wickets at an average of 22.43, with best figures of 4/38.

He has also played Second XI cricket for the Northamptonshire Second XI in 2000.
