= Guy Bulpitt =

English cricketer

Personal information
- Full name: Guy Bulpitt
- Born: 16 April 1968 (age 58); Stafford, Staffordshire, England
- Batting: Right-handed
- Bowling: Slow left-arm orthodox

Domestic team information
- Years: Team
- 1998–2004: Staffordshire

Career statistics
| Competition | List A |
|---|---|
| Matches | 7 |
| Runs scored | 4 |
| Batting average | 2.00 |
| 100s/50s | –/– |
| Top score | 2* |
| Balls bowled | 328 |
| Wickets | 8 |
| Bowling average | 23.00 |
| 5 wickets in innings | – |
| 10 wickets in match | – |
| Best bowling | 3/39 |
| Catches/stumpings | 2/– |
- Source: Cricinfo, 13 June 2011

Guy Bulpitt (born 16 April 1968) is a former English cricketer. Bulpitt was a right-handed batsman who bowled slow left-arm orthodox. He was born in Stafford, Staffordshire.

Bulpitt made his debut for Staffordshire in the 1998 MCCA Knockout Trophy against the Leicestershire Cricket Board. Bulpitt played Minor counties cricket for Staffordshire from 1998 to 2004, which included 37 Minor Counties Championship matches and 20 MCCA Knockout Trophy matches. In 2001, he made his List A debut against the Worcestershire Cricket Board in the Cheltenham & Gloucester Trophy. He made 6 further appearances in List A cricket, the last coming against Lancashire in the 2004 Cheltenham & Gloucester Trophy. In his 7 List A matches, he took 8 wickets at an average of 23.00, with best figures of 3/39.
