= Ben Platt (cricketer) =

Welsh cricketer (born 1980)

Ben Platt (born 20 April 1980) is a Welsh former cricketer. He was a left-handed batsman and a left-arm slow bowler who played for Shropshire. He was born in St. Asaph, Denbighshire.

Platt, who played for Shropshire in the Minor Counties Championship between 1999 and 2003, made a single List A appearance for the side, in the C&G Trophy in September 2002.

Platt scored 8 runs in the match and took bowling figures of 2-15 from 10 overs.
