= Bradley Parker =

English cricketer (born 1970)

Bradley Parker (born 23 June 1970) is a former English first-class cricketer, who played for Yorkshire County Cricket Club between 1992 and 1998. He also played one day cricket for Yorkshire between 1993 and 2005.

He was born in Mirfield, Yorkshire.

A neat right-handed batsman, Parker averaged 30.14 in first-class cricket, scoring 1,839 runs including two centuries with a best of 138 not out against Oxford University. His only County Championship ton was 127 against Surrey. He played in eighty one day matches, scoring 1,176 runs at 19.60, with his highest innings being 108 for Northumberland against the Yorkshire Cricket Board.

He was a mainstay of Yorkshire's Second XI, making his debut for them aged 17, and played Minor Counties cricket for Northumberland from 2000 to 2006.
