= John Owen (cricketer) =

English cricketer (born 1971)

John Edward Houghton Owen (born 7 August 1971 in Derby) is an English former cricketer who represented Derbyshire between 1994 and 1999.
