= Steve Johnson (cricketer) =

English cricketer

Personal information
- Full name: John Stephen Johnson
- Born: 7 July 1944 (age 82); Doncaster, Yorkshire, England
- Batting: Right-handed

Domestic team information
- Years: Team
- 1983: Minor Counties
- 1979: Minor Counties North
- 1978: Minor Counties East
- 1967–1991: Shropshire

Career statistics
Competition	First-class	List A
Matches	1	16
Runs scored	170	239
Batting average	170.00	14.93
100s/50s	1/–	–/1
Top score	146*	51
Balls bowled	–	–
Wickets	–	–
Bowling average	–	–
5 wickets in innings	–	–
10 wickets in match	–	–
Best bowling	–	–
Catches/stumpings	–/–	8/–
- Source: Cricinfo, 3 August 2011

John Stephen Johnson (born 7 July 1944) is a former English cricketer. Johnson was a right-handed batsman. He was born in Doncaster, Yorkshire.

Johnson made his debut for Shropshire against Cambridgeshire in the 1967 Minor Counties Championship. He played Minor counties cricket for Bedfordshire from 1967 to 1991, making 178 Minor Counties Championship appearances and 7 MCCA Knockout Trophy appearances. He made his List A debut for Shropshire against Essex in the 1974 Gillette Cup. He made 6 further List A appearances for the county, the last of which came against Leicestershire in the 1989 NatWest Trophy. In his 7 List A matches for Shropshire, he scored 55 runs at an average of 7.85, with a high score of 27.

Playing for Shropshire allowed him to represent a Minor counties cricket team in one form of another. He made 3 List A appearances in the 1978 Benson & Hedges Cup for Minor Counties East, scoring 30 runs at an average of 10.00, with a high score of 25. The following season he played for Minor Counties North in the 1979 Benson & Hedges Cup, making 4 appearances for the team. He scored 132 runs in these 4 matches, at an average of 33.00, with a high score of 51. This score, his only List A fifty, came against Nottinghamshire. He appeared twice for the Minor Counties cricket team in the 1980 Benson & Hedges Cup, playing against Glamorgan and Gloucestershire. He also played his only first-class match for the Minor Counties against the touring Indians in 1979. Opening the batting, he scored an unbeaten 146 in the Minor Counties first-innings, while in their second-innings he was dismissed for 24 runs by Karsan Ghavri.

Johnson later stood as an umpire in Minor counties and List A cricket.
