= Julian Wood =

English cricketer

Personal information
- Full name: Julian Ross Wood
- Born: 21 November 1968 (age 57); Winchester, Hampshire, England
- Nickname: Woody
- Batting: Left-handed
- Bowling: Right-arm medium

Domestic team information
- Years: Team
- 1989–1993: Hampshire
- 1994–2006: Berkshire

Head coaching information
- Years: Team
- 2023–: Chattogram Challengers
- 2025-2026 (expected): Sri lanka

Career statistics
Competition	First-class	LA
Matches	27	55
Runs scored	960	1,131
Batting average	29.09	24.58
100s/50s	0/5	0/7
Top score	96	92*
Balls bowled	63	89
Wickets	1	4
Bowling average	38.00	16.50
5 wickets in innings	0	0
10 wickets in match	0	0
Best bowling	1/5	2/14
Catches/stumpings	13/–	11/–
- Source: Cricinfo, 12 December 2009

Julian Ross Wood (born 21 November 1968) is a retired English cricketer. Wood was a left-handed batsman and a right-arm medium pace bowler. He was born at Winchester in Hampshire and educated at Leighton Park School in Berkshire.

Wood made his Hampshire first-class debut against local rivals Sussex in the 1989 County Championship. The same year Wood would also make his one-day debut against Northamptonshire. Wood would play for Hampshire until the end of the 1993 County Championship when he was released by Hampshire. Wood represented them in 27 first-class and 42 one-day matches.

In 1994 Wood signed for Berkshire. He represented the club in the Minor Counties Championship, playing 66 matches for Berkshire. Wood also represented them in 33 Minor Counties Trophy matches, as well as 13 one-day matches that had List-A status in the English domestic one-day cricket competition. Wood played his final List-A match against Gloucestershire in 2005. After twelve years with Berkshire, Wood retired from all forms of cricket during the 2006 Minor Counties Championship.

His father, Ross Wood, was an umpire.
