= 1998 English cricket season =

The 1998 English cricket season was the 99th in which the County Championship had been an official competition. Leicestershire won the title for the second time in three seasons while Lancashire performed the one day double. In two Test series, England defeated South Africa 2–1 and lost 1–0 to Sri Lanka.

== Honours ==
- County Championship - Leicestershire
- NatWest Trophy - Lancashire
- Sunday League - Lancashire
- Benson & Hedges Cup - Essex
- Minor Counties Championship - Staffordshire
- MCCA Knockout Trophy - Devon
- Second XI Championship - Northamptonshire II
- Wisden - Ian Austin, Darren Gough, Muttiah Muralitharan, Arjuna Ranatunga, Jonty Rhodes

== External sources ==
- CricketArchive – season and tournament itineraries

== Annual reviews ==
- Playfair Cricket Annual 1999
- Wisden Cricketers' Almanack 1999
