= James Hands =

English cricketer (born 1978)

Personal information
- Full name: James Michael Hands
- Born: 9 October 1978 (age 48); Truro, Cornwall, England
- Batting: Right-handed
- Bowling: Slow left-arm orthodox

Domestic team information
- Years: Team
- 1996–2007: Cornwall

Career statistics
| Competition | List A |
|---|---|
| Matches | 8 |
| Runs scored | 187 |
| Batting average | 23.37 |
| 100s/50s | 0/1 |
| Top score | 61 |
| Balls bowled | 378 |
| Wickets | 10 |
| Bowling average | 24.50 |
| 5 wickets in innings | 0 |
| 10 wickets in match | 0 |
| Best bowling | 3/25 |
| Catches/stumpings | 4/– |
- Source: Cricinfo, 17 October 2010

James Michael Hands (born 9 October 1978) is an English cricketer. Hands is a right-handed batsman who bowls slow left-arm orthodox. He was born in Truro, Cornwall.

Hands made his Minor Counties Championship debut for Cornwall County Cricket Club in 1996 against Cheshire. From 1996 to 2007, he represented the county in 42 Minor Counties Championship matches, the last of which came against Shropshire. Hands also represented Cornwall in the MCCA Knockout Trophy. His debut in that competition came against Devon in 1998. From 1998 to 2004, he represented the county in 6 Trophy matches, the last of which came against Bedfordshire.

Hands also represented Cornwall in List A cricket. His first List A match came against Warwickshire in the 1996 NatWest Trophy. From 1996 to 2003, he represented the county in eight List A matches, the last of which came against the Netherlands in the 1st round of the 2004 Cheltenham & Gloucester Trophy which was played in 2003. In his eight List A matches, he scored 187 runs at a batting average of 23.37, with a single half century1. With the ball he took 10 wickets at a bowling average of 24.50, with best figures of 3/25.

Hands played club cricket for Blackheath Cricket Club in the Kent Cricket League.
