= Andy Tutt =

English cricketer

Personal information
- Full name: Andrew Tutt
- Born: 21 February 1968 (age 58); Bermondsey, London
- Batting: Right-handed
- Bowling: Right-arm medium
- Role: Bowler

Domestic team information
- Years: Team
- 1992: Kent
- 1998–2001: Kent Cricket Board

Career statistics
Competition	First-class	List A
Matches	1	10
Runs scored	–	10
Batting average	–	3.33
100s/50s	–	0/0
Top score	–	5*
Balls bowled	114	411
Wickets	0	9
Bowling average	–	30.66
5 wickets in innings	–	0
10 wickets in match	–	0
Best bowling	–	3/16
Catches/stumpings	0/–	1/–
- Source: Cricinfo, 15 June 2022

Andrew Tutt (born 21 February 1968) is a former English cricketer who played one first-class cricket match for Kent County Cricket Club in 1992. Tutt also captained the Kent Cricket Board team in List A cricket matches.

Tutt was born in Bermondsey in London in 1968. He played regularly for Kent's Second XI in 1992 and made his only senior appearance for the club against Cambridge University in June of that year. in the Kent Cricket League he played club cricket for Bromley, Bexley and Hartley Country Club and played in 10 List A matches for Kent Cricket Board in the NatWest Trophy and Cheltenham & Gloucester Trophy between 1999 and 2002, captaining the team in 1999 when they beat Denmark in the first round of the competition.
