= Mark Fell (cricketer) =

English cricketer

Mark Andrew Fell (born 17 November 1960) is a former English cricketer. He was a right-handed batsman and a slow left-arm bowler who played first-class cricket for Nottinghamshire and Derbyshire between 1981 and 1985.

Fell first represented Nottinghamshire in the 1979 Second XI Championship, playing in this and the Warwickshire Under-25 Competition for the next two years. Fell also played in the Benson and Hedges Cup campaigns of 1982, (for Nottinghamshire), 1986, and 1996 (for the Minor Counties), interspersing a three-and-a-half month stint with Derbyshire in the meantime. Fell has intermittently played for Lincolnshire in Minor Counties cricket from 1986 to the present day, having most recently turned out for the 2006 Championship. He has played in the MCC Trophy for Lincolnshire since 1993.

Fell has chopped and changed his position in the batting lineup several times, being an upper-order batsman during his earlier days for the Second XI, maintaining a lower-order stream in the County Championship.

In 1987, he and his Bassetlaw and District Cricket League team-mates reached the final of the LCC President's Trophy, losing to Durham County League.
