= Middlesex Cricket Board =

The Middlesex Cricket Board was formed in 1996. It is the governing body for all recreational cricket in the historic county of Middlesex.

The Board of the MCB consists of five representatives nominated by the Middlesex County Cricket Club Board of Directors

MCB operates through six standing sub-committees, responsible for Cricket, Facilities, Publicity and Sponsorship, Women's Cricket, Finance, and Youth and Coaching, through it is responsible for co-ordinating all development work in Middlesex.

== Board of directors ==
- Andrew Cornish
- Johan de Silva
- David Kendix
- Illa Sharma
- Richard Sykes

== Staff ==
• Head of Recreational Cricket
• Cricket Development Manager
• Cricket Development Officer
• Cricket Development Officer Mash Mehter
• Cricket Development Officer Ian Moore
• Cricket Development Officer
• Cricket Volunteer Co-ordinator Martyn Fryer
• Administrator James Keightley
