= List of Surrey Cricket Board List A players =

Surrey Cricket Board played in List A cricket matches between 1999 and 2002. This is a list of the players who appeared in those matches.

- Sam Andrews (2001): SJ Andrews
- Sairaj Bahutule (2002): SV Bahutule
- Mark Bainbridge (1999–2001): MR Bainbridge
- Aidan Baker (2002): AF Baker
- Gareth Batty (2000): GJ Batty
- Ian Bishop (1999): IE Bishop
- Richard Bowers (2001–2002): RB Bowers
- Noel Brett (2002): NA Brett
- Chris Bullen (1999–2001): CK Bullen
- Michael Carberry (1999): MA Carberry
- Timothy Carter (1999–2001): TJ Carter
- Rikki Clarke (2001): R Clarke
- James Clutterbuck (1999): J Clutterbuck
- Graham Crawford (1999): GA Crawford
- Efren Cruz (2001–2002): EP Cruz
- Zander de Bruyn (2000–2001): Z de Bruyn
- Bob Falconer (1999): RJ Falconer
- Neil Farnsworth (2000): NJ Farnsworth
- Quentin Ferreira (1999): Q Ferreira
- John Fry (1999–2002): JAW Fry
- David Gorrod (2001–2002): DE Gorrod
- Max Hall (2001–2002): MP Hall
- Tim Hodgson (2000–2001): TP Hodgson
- Andrew Hollingsworth (2001–2002): AP Hollingsworth
- Peter James (1999–2000): PM James
- Richard Johnson (2001–2002): RK Johnson
- Neil Kendrick (1999): NM Kendrick
- Mark Kenlock (1999–2000): SG Kenlock
- Richard Mansfield (2001–2002): RJ Mansfield
- Kervin Marc (2001): K Marc
- Gary Martin (2002): GRE Martin
- Tim Murtagh (2001): TJ Murtagh
- Scott Newman (2001): SA Newman
- Joe Porter (2002): JJ Porter
- Giles Puckle (2001): GD Puckle
- Philip Sampson (2000): PJ Sampson
- Oliver Slipper (2000): OM Slipper
- Jonathan Wileman (1999–2001): JR Wileman
