= Ashtead Cricket Club =

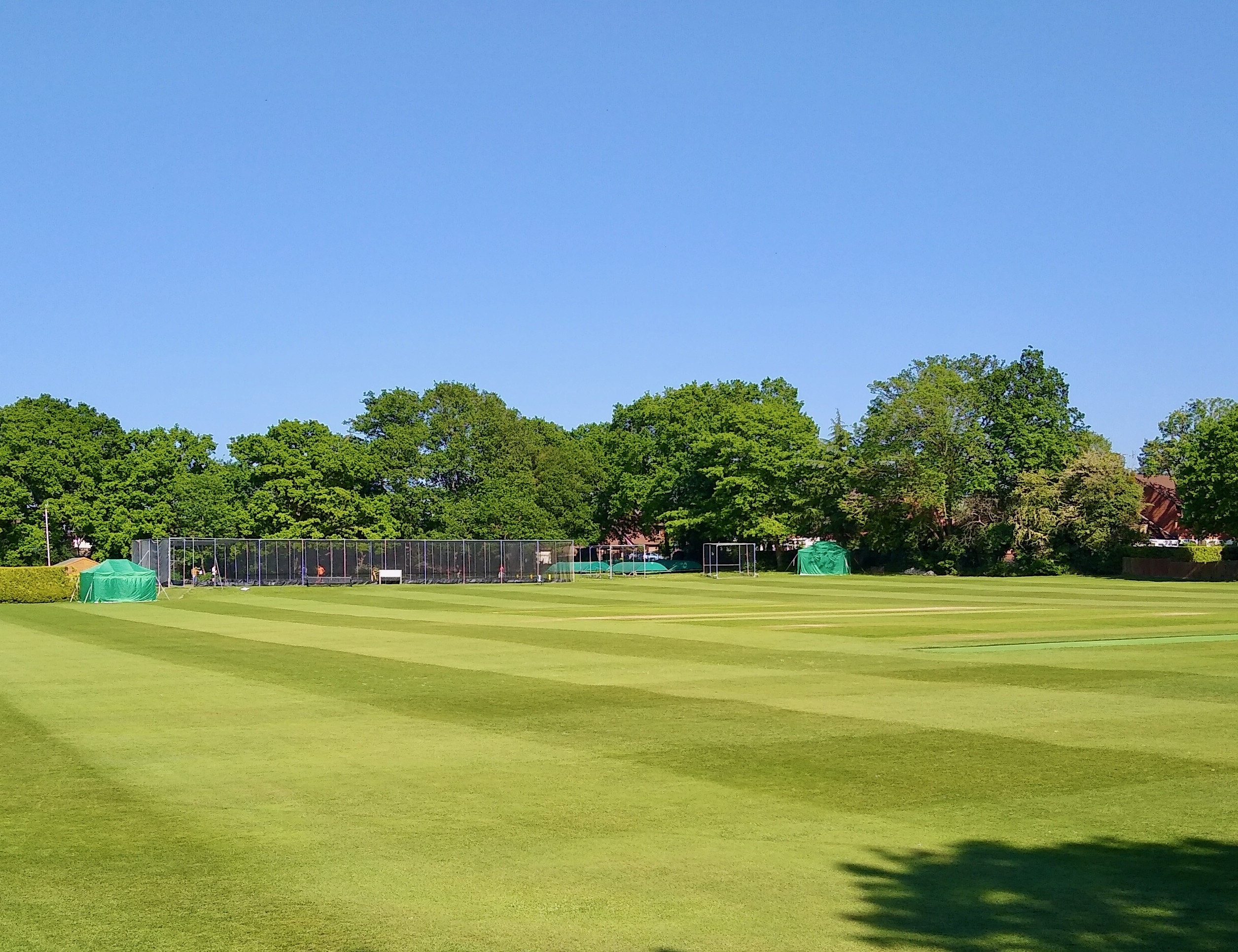
- Ashtead cricket ground, Woodfield Lane
- Nickname(s): Stags
- League: Surrey Championship

Team information
- City: Ashtead, Surrey
- Colours
- Founded: 1887
- Home ground: Woodfield Lane, Ashtead, KT21 2BJ
- Secondary home ground(s): Parsons Mead (Junior) North Holmwood Sports Club (3rd XI & 4th XI)
- Official website: Ashtead CC

Ashtead Cricket Club is a cricket club that plays in the Surrey Championship Premier League. The club was formed in 1887 and play their home games at Woodfield Lane, Ashtead. The club has a second ground for junior matches and training, on the former playing fields of Parsons Mead School.

In 2014 the club finished runners-up in the ECB National Club Twenty20, losing to winners Chester Boughton Hall at Wantage Road, Northampton.

== Honours ==
=== First XI honours ===
- Surrey Championship
  - Club T20
    - Champions – 2014
  - Division 1
    - Champions – 2015
  - Division 2
    - Champions – 2005, 2014
  - Division 3
    - Champions – 2001
- ECB National Club Twenty20
  - Runners up – 2014

=== Second XI honours ===
- Surrey Championship
  - Division 1
    - Champions – 2010, 2012
  - Division 2
    - Champions – 2009
  - Division 3
    - Champions – 2008
  - Division 4
    - Champions – 2007

=== Third XI honours ===
- Surrey Championship
  - Division 1
    - Champions – 2015

=== Fourth XI honours ===
- Surrey Championship
  - West Division
    - Champions – 2008
  - East Division
    - Champions – 2015

== Notable players ==
The cricketers listed below have played in First-Class or List A cricket teams.

- Aamer Nazir
- Alan Mullally
- Andrew Ellis
- Neil Farnsworth
- Ben Geddes
- Ben Jeffery
- Ben Sidwell
- Carl Anderson
- Damian Shirazi
- Danny Miller
- Dave Burton
- David White
- Dominic Sibley
- Gary Martin
- Gary Wilson
- Harri Aravinthan
- James Cameron
- John Vaughan-Davies
- Jono Sole
- Kieran Powell
- Mahesh Rawat
- Mark Stoneman
- Matthew Breetzke
- Matthew Friedlander
- Sean Hunt
- Seb Stewart
- Simon Keene
- Paul Harrison
- Paul Taylor
- Tom Williams
- Will Pereira
- Zac Elkin
