= Wimbledon Cricket Club Ground =

London sports venue

Coordinates: 51.43454°N 0.21063°W

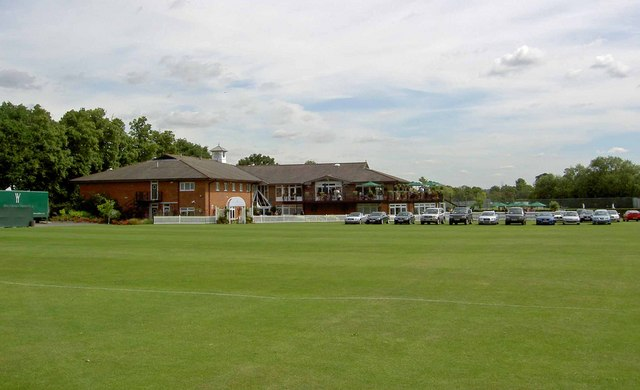

Ground information
- Location: Wimbledon, London
- Establishment: 1854

Team information
Surrey Cricket Board	(1999)
- As of 28 August 2010; Source: Ground profile

Wimbledon Cricket Club Ground is a cricket ground in Wimbledon, London. The ground is located opposite the All England Lawn Tennis and Croquet Club, famous for hosting the Wimbledon Championships.

The first recorded match on the ground was in 1891, when Wimbledon played Marlborough Blues. In constant use from 1891 to the present day, the ground has also hosted several Second XI Championship fixtures for the Surrey Second XI. The ground has held a single List-A match, which came in the 1999 NatWest Trophy and was between the Surrey Cricket Board and Cheshire.

In local domestic cricket, the venue is the home ground of Wimbledon Cricket Club who play in the Surrey Championship. The club has used the ground since 1854.
