= Winchmore Hill Cricket Club =

- League: Middlesex County Cricket League

Personnel
- Captain: (England) Charlie Avent
- Chairman: (England) Matt Webster
- Overseas player: (Australia) Luke Jacobs

Team information
- City: Winchmore Hill, London
- Colours
- Founded: 1880
- Home ground: The Paulin Ground, Ford's Grove, London N21 3DN

History
- Middlesex Premier League wins: 1
- Middlesex Cup wins: 1
- Official website: winchmorehillcc.co.uk

Winchmore Hill Cricket Club is a cricket club in London, United Kingdom. The club was formed in 1880, and play their home games at The Paulin Ground in Winchmore Hill. The club competes in the Middlesex County Cricket League (MCCL), notably winning the Premier League in 2012.

== Club history ==
The club was founded in the autumn of 1880 as Winchmore Hill Village Cricket Club by John Moore, who was Head Gardener to the Busk family at Ford's Grove. 'Village' was dropped from the name in 1912, when the current club title was adopted. The pavilion dates back to 1922 and is a former Officer's Mess from a wartime army camp in Wimbledon. The cost of the pavilion, £1,750, was borne mostly from donations and loans by the President and members.

In the 1950s, the West Indies batsman, Allan Rae, played for Winchmore Hill CC whilst completing a law degree in England. During this time he also scored centuries for the West Indies at Lord's and The Oval. In July 1949, a tour match organised by Rae between the West Indies and Winchmore Hill was played at The Paulin Ground, featuring players such as Learie Constantine and Everton Weekes.

In 2012, Winchmore Hill CC secured their maiden Premier League title in the penultimate game of the season against Ealing Cricket Club.

In 2013, Winchmore Hill CC became part of Winchmore Hill Sports Club in recognition of the multi sport nature of the club. Other sports played at The Paulin Ground include football, tennis, hockey and table tennis.

Following the club's maiden Middlesex Premier League title, a period of poor performance followed and the 1st XI was relegated in both the 2013 and 2014 seasons to the Middlesex County Cricket League (MCCL) Division 3. In 2017, Winchmore Hill CC were champions of MCCL Division 3 and promoted to MCCL Division 1 where they have played for the last two seasons.

In 2020, Winchmore Hill CC secured the Middlesex County Cricket League cup, beating North London CC in the final.

The club boasts 3 cricket pitches with electronic scoreboards, high quality nets and a multi-use games area (MUGA). The club's first team pitch has consistently been ranked as one of the best pitches in the league.

Winchmore Hill CC has a longstanding link with Kensington Cricket Club in Adelaide, and many of the club's players have played for both clubs.

== Honours ==
- 2012 – ECB Middlesex Premier League Champions
- 2020 – ECB Middlesex Cup Champions

== Teams ==
Winchmore Hill CC field six senior men's teams in Saturday cricket, all playing in their respective Middlesex County Cricket League (MCCL) divisions. The club also fields up to four Sunday teams. A Sunday 1st XI compete in the County and National Cup competitions, Winchmore Hill Tigers and Lions play social matches and a Youth Development XI play in the Middlesex Development League.

Winchmore Hill CC also has a thriving juniors section ranging from under 5 to under 17, overseen by Chandrasekar_Ganapathy, the clubs Director of Cricket since 2026. A large number of juniors have subsequently progressed to play for the 1st XI and professional county cricket clubs. In 2019, both the U15 and the U17 teams were crowned Middlesex champions. The first county titles for a junior team for over 30 years. In both 2020 and 2025, the under 17s were again crowned Middlesex champions.

== First Team League Records ==
Winchmore Hill joined the Middlesex County League in 1972 and since then the following records have been set:

- Highest Team Score : 336–1 dec v Richmond at The Paulin Ground in 2009
- Highest Individual Score : 167 – Andy Varley (2003)
- Most Runs in a Season : 987 – Shaun Levy (2006)
- Best Bowling : 9/17 – Jamie Thorpe v Teddington at The Paulin Ground in 2011
- Most Wickets in a Season : 65 – Frank Griffith (2000)

== Cricket Week ==
Winchmore Hill CC holds an annual cricket week in July with matches being played every day. Regular cricket week fixtures include matches against the MCC and Wanstead Cricket Club and a 6-a-side cricket tournament. Other activities during cricket week include Boat Racing, Stumps and deceiving batsmen by bowling them oranges.

== Notable former players ==
- (England) David Alleyne
- (Cricket West Indies) Shamarh Brooks
- (Cricket West Indies) Darryl Brown
- (England) David Burton
- (Scotland) Josh Davey
- (England) Frank Griffith
- (England) Johnny Haynes
- (England) Cliff Holton
- (New Zealand) Glen Jackson
- (England) Aaron Laraman
- (England) Danny Law
- (England) Colin Metson
- (England) Scott Newman
- (Cricket West Indies) Allan Rae
- (England) Graham Rose
- (England) Owais Shah
- (England) Kevin Sorrell
- (England) Luke Stoughton
