= Ealing Cricket Club Lawn Tennis Tournament =

Defunct tennis tournament
- Founded: 1880; 145 years ago
- Abolished: 1880; 145 years ago
- Location: Ealing, Middlesex, England
- Venue: Ealing Cricket Club
- Surface: Grass

The Ealing Cricket Club Lawn Tennis Tournament was a combined men's and women's grass court tennis event staged only one time in September 1880 . It was held on the grounds of the Ealing Cricket Club (f.1870), Ealing, Middlesex, England.

== History ==
In 1870 the Ealing Cricket Club was founded. In September, 1880 it established lawn tennis tournament that was played on the Ealing Cricket Club Ground. The tournament was staged only one time. It featured a men's singles event that was won by F.W. Rawson who defeated Alfred Penn Gaskell, who would later be a finalist at the East of England Championships. It also featured a mix doubles event that was won by Mr. Rawson, and a 17 year old Blanche Bingley, she would go onto to win her first Wimbledon singles title in 1886.

In 1882 following this tournaments short lived existence, the Ealing Lawn Tennis & Archery Club was formally established at St. Leonards Road, West Ealing. This club would go on to stage the Ealing LTC Open Tournament in its first year, that continued until 1884 when it staged their first Ealing LTC Championship. Bingley became a member of the Ealing LTAC and, went onto to win five more titles at Wimbledon whilst representing her club.
