= Jonathan Wileman =

English cricketer (born 1970)

Personal information
- Full name: Jonathan Ritchie Wileman
- Born: 19 August 1970 (age 56); Sheffield, Yorkshire, England
- Batting: Right-handed
- Bowling: Right-arm medium

Domestic team information
- Years: Team
- 2000: Marylebone Cricket Club
- 1999 & 2001: Surrey Cricket Board
- 1994: Minor Counties
- 1993–1998: Lincolnshire
- 1992–1996: Nottinghamshire

Career statistics
Competition	FC	LA
Matches	12	25
Runs scored	447	286
Batting average	39.80	23.83
100s/50s	1/–	–/1
Top score	109	51*
Balls bowled	570	626
Wickets	4	20
Bowling average	54.25	29.00
5 wickets in innings	–	–
10 wickets in match	–	–
Best bowling	2/33	4/21
Catches/stumpings	9/–	12/–
- Source: Cricinfo, 31 October 2010

Jonathan Ritchie Wileman (born 19 August 1970) is a former English cricketer. Wileman was a right-handed batsman who bowls right-arm medium pace. He was born at Sheffield, Yorkshire and educated at Malvern College and Salford University.

Wileman made his first-class debut for Nottinghamshire against Cambridge University in 1992. From 1992 to 1996, he represented the county in 12 first-class matches, the last of which came against Oxford University. In those 10 matches, he scored 339 runs at a batting average of 26.07, with a single century high score of 109. With the ball he took 4 wickets a bowling average of 54.25, with best figures of 2/23. In 1993, he also played a single first-class match for a Combined Universities team against the touring Australians, while the following season he played a single first-class match for a combined Minor Counties team against the touring South Africans.

While representing Nottinghamshire in the County Championship, it was in 1993 that Wileman joined Lincolnshire and it was with Lincolnshire that he made his debut in List A cricket against Glamorgan in the 1994 NatWest Trophy. Wileman played the vast majority of his List A matches for Nottinghamshire, with his List A debut for them coming in 1995 against Derbyshire. From 1994 to 1995, he represented the county in 20 List A matches the last of which came against Durham in the 1995 AXA Equity and Law League. In 1997, he played his second and final List A match for Lincolnshire against Derbyshire in the 1997 NatWest Trophy.

As well as representing Lincolnshire in List A cricket, he also played for the county in Minor counties cricket. Starting in 1993 against Norfolk, from then till 1998, he represented the county in 25 Minor Counties Championship matches, the last of which came against Buckinghamshire. He also represented the county in the MCCA Knockout Trophy, making his debut in that competition against Northumberland in 1994. From 1994 to 1998, he represented the county in 11 Trophy matches, the last of which came against Shropshire.

In the 1999 NatWest Trophy, Wileman made his debut in List A cricket for the Surrey Cricket Board against Cheshire. He played a further List A match for the Board against Surrey in the 2001 Cheltenham & Gloucester Trophy. In 2000, he played a single List A match for the Marylebone Cricket Club against the touring Zimbabweans. In his career total of 25 List A matches, he scored 286 runs at an average of 23.83, with a single half century high score of 51*. With the ball he took 20 wickets at an average of 29.00, with best figures of 4/21.

He currently plays club cricket for Wimbledon Cricket Club in the Surrey Championship.
