= Giles Puckle =

English cricketer

Personal information
- Full name: Giles David Puckle
- Born: 24 May 1979 (age 47); Epsom, Surrey, England
- Batting: Right-handed
- Bowling: Slow left-arm orthodox

Domestic team information
- Years: Team
- 2001: Surrey Cricket Board

Career statistics
Competition	LA
Matches	1
Runs scored	5
Batting average	5.00
100s/50s	–/–
Top score	5
Balls bowled	60
Wickets	2
Bowling average	23.00
5 wickets in innings	–
10 wickets in match	–
Best bowling	2/46
Catches/stumpings	–/–
- Source: Cricinfo, 28 October 2010

Giles David Puckle (born 24 March 1979) is an English cricketer. Puckle is a right-handed batsman who bowled slow left-arm orthodox. He was born at Epsom, Surrey.

Puckle represented the Surrey Cricket Board in a single List A match against Lincolnshire in the 2nd round of the 2002 Cheltenham & Gloucester Trophy which was played in 2001. In his only List A match, he scored 5 runs and took 2 wickets at a bowling average of 23.00, with figures of 2/46.

He currently plays club cricket for Malden Wanderers Cricket Club in the Surrey Championship.
