= Old Deer Park cricket ground =

Cricket ground in Richmond, London, England

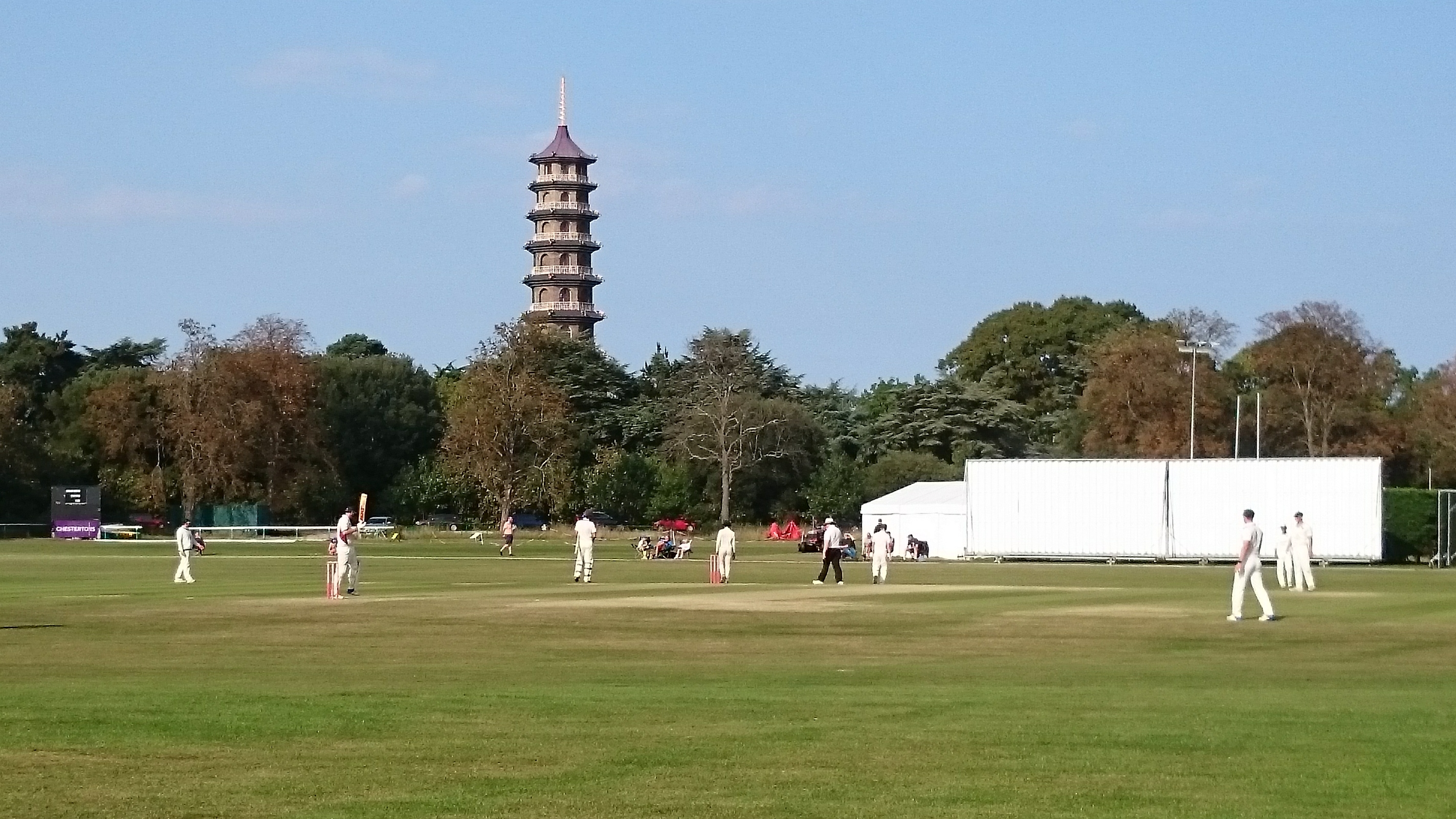
- The ground in 2020. Overlooking the Park is the Great Pagoda, Kew Gardens
- Interactive map of Old Deer Park cricket ground
- Location: Richmond, London (in Surrey until 1965)
- Coordinates: 51.469°N 0.296°W
- Home club: Richmond Cricket Club
- Establishment: c. 1864
- Capacity: 3,000

Old Deer Park cricket ground is part of the Old Deer Park in Richmond, London. The park has been used as a venue for cricket since the 1860s and is home to Richmond Cricket Club. Old Deer Park has hosted occasional Middlesex county matches since the 1990s.

In 1867, Richmond played a United South of England Eleven at the ground. The Australian Aboriginal tour in 1868 included a two-day match there against Richmond – a 1988 tour commemorated this with a replay of the fixture. Other overseas teams that played at Old Deer Park included New Zealand in 1927, the South American XI in 1932, and Nigeria from 1955 to 1959.

Despite historically being within Surrey, Old Deer Park has played host to List A matches involving Middlesex. The first of these was the visit of Nottinghamshire in the 2000 Norwich Union National League. In 2001 Middlesex Cricket Board played a home List A match at the ground in the Cheltenham & Gloucester Trophy against Berkshire. From 2000 to 2004 a total of five List A matches were played on the ground, the last of which saw Middlesex play Scotland in the 2004 Totesport League.

Middlesex Women played a List A game against Essex at Old Deer Park in the 2009 Women's County Championship. Previously, Middlesex met Surrey Women in a friendly there in 1999.

Middlesex have also played 15 men's Twenty20 matches at Old Deer Park. The first T20 match there was a 2003 Twenty20 Cup fixture against Kent. The club used the ground in the Twenty20 Cup/T20 Blast until the 2019 season.

The ground has hosted a number of county Second XI matches. Surrey Second XI played Norfolk in the 1923 Minor Counties Championship, and since 1990 Middlesex Second XI have played some of their matches there.

In club cricket, the ground has been the home venue of Richmond Cricket Club since 1864. Richmond have competed in the Middlesex County Cricket League since it began in 1972. Australian Adam Gilchrist played for Richmond at Old Deer Park in 1989 before he became an international star. Late in his career, he returned to Old Deer Park as a Middlesex player in the 2010 Twenty20 Cup, in their match against Glamorgan.

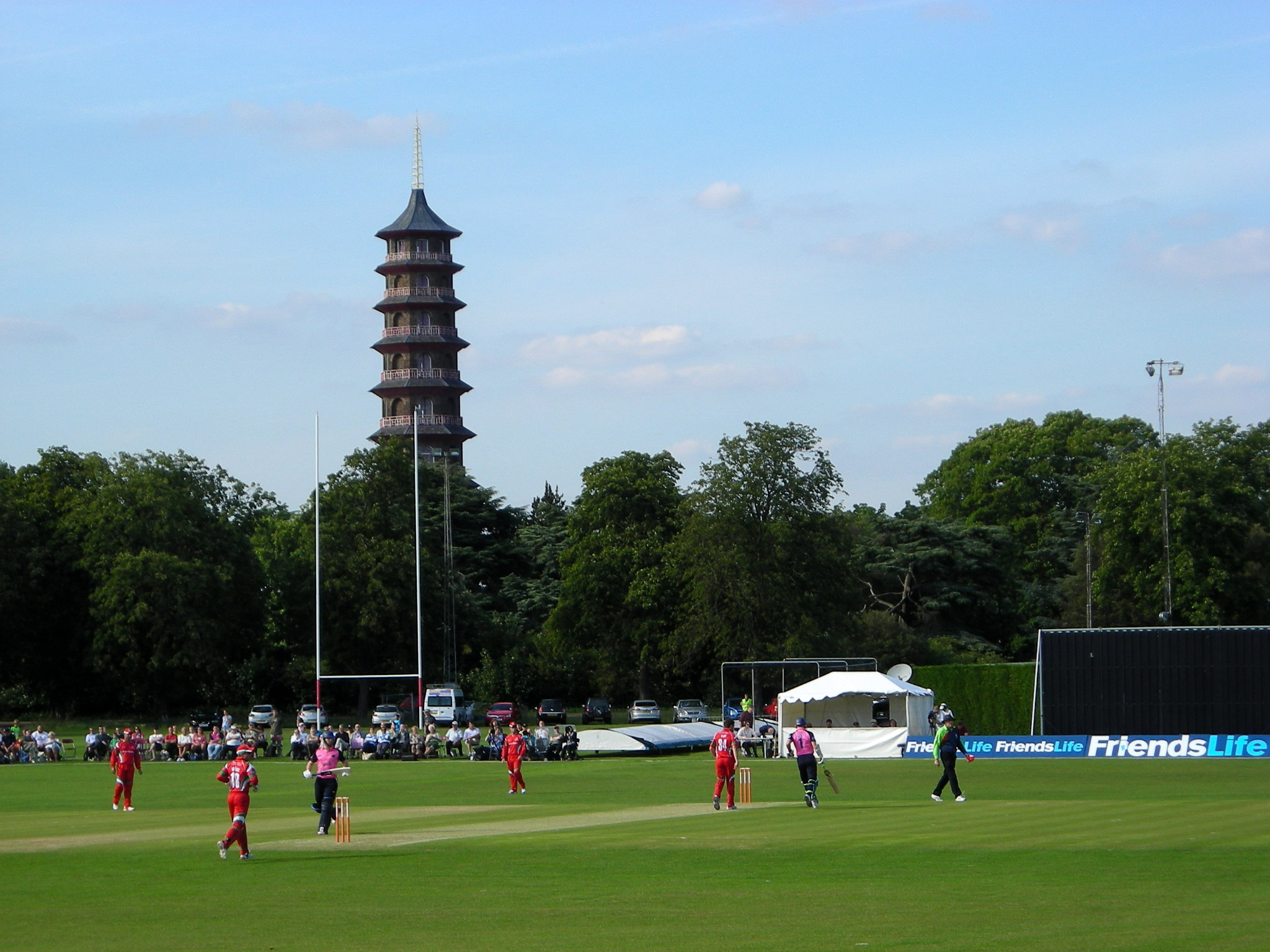
Match in 2010, with the Great Pagoda and London Welsh rugby ground

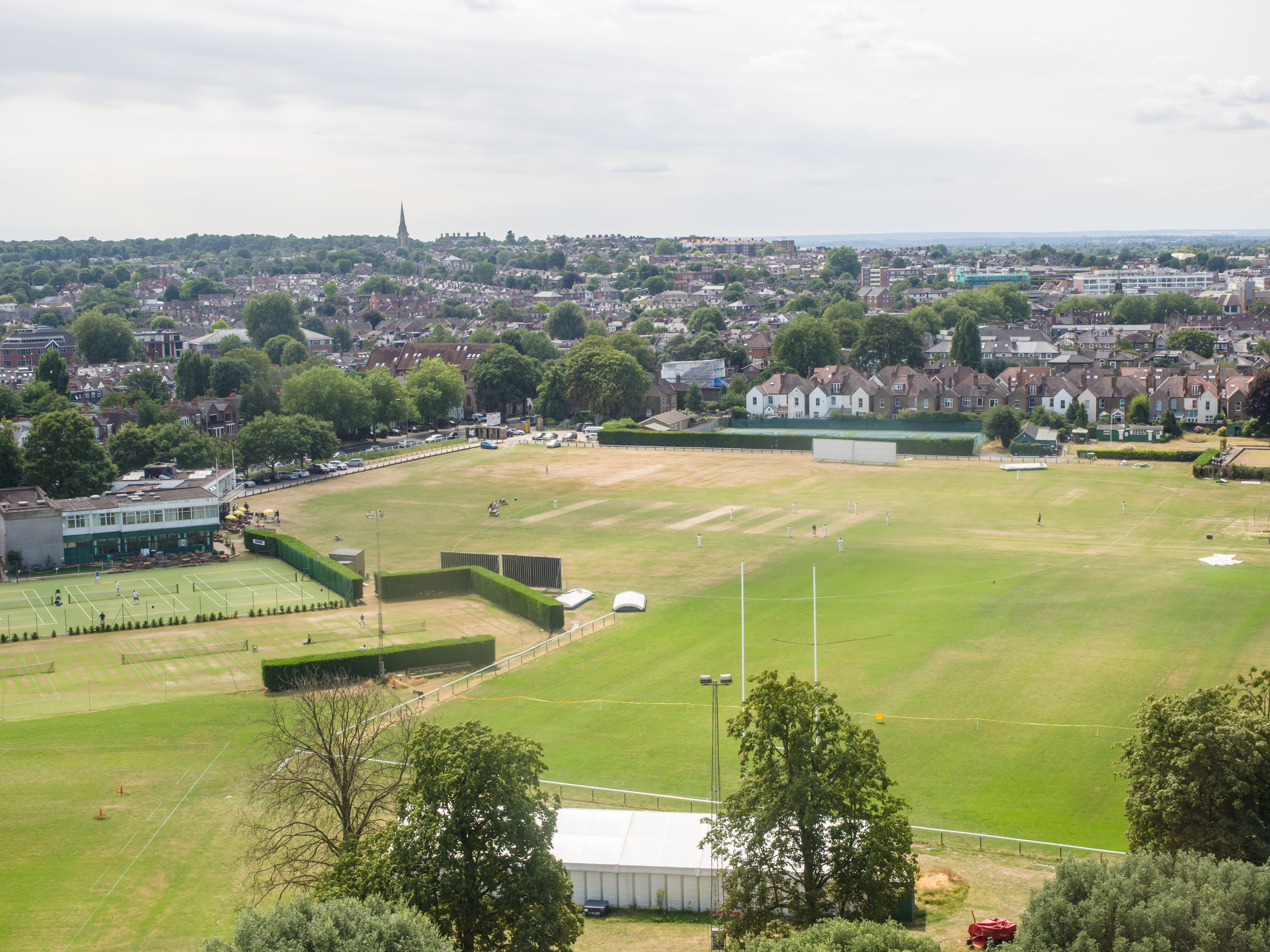
The cricket ground and Richmond Lawn Tennis Club in 2014, seen from the Pagoda

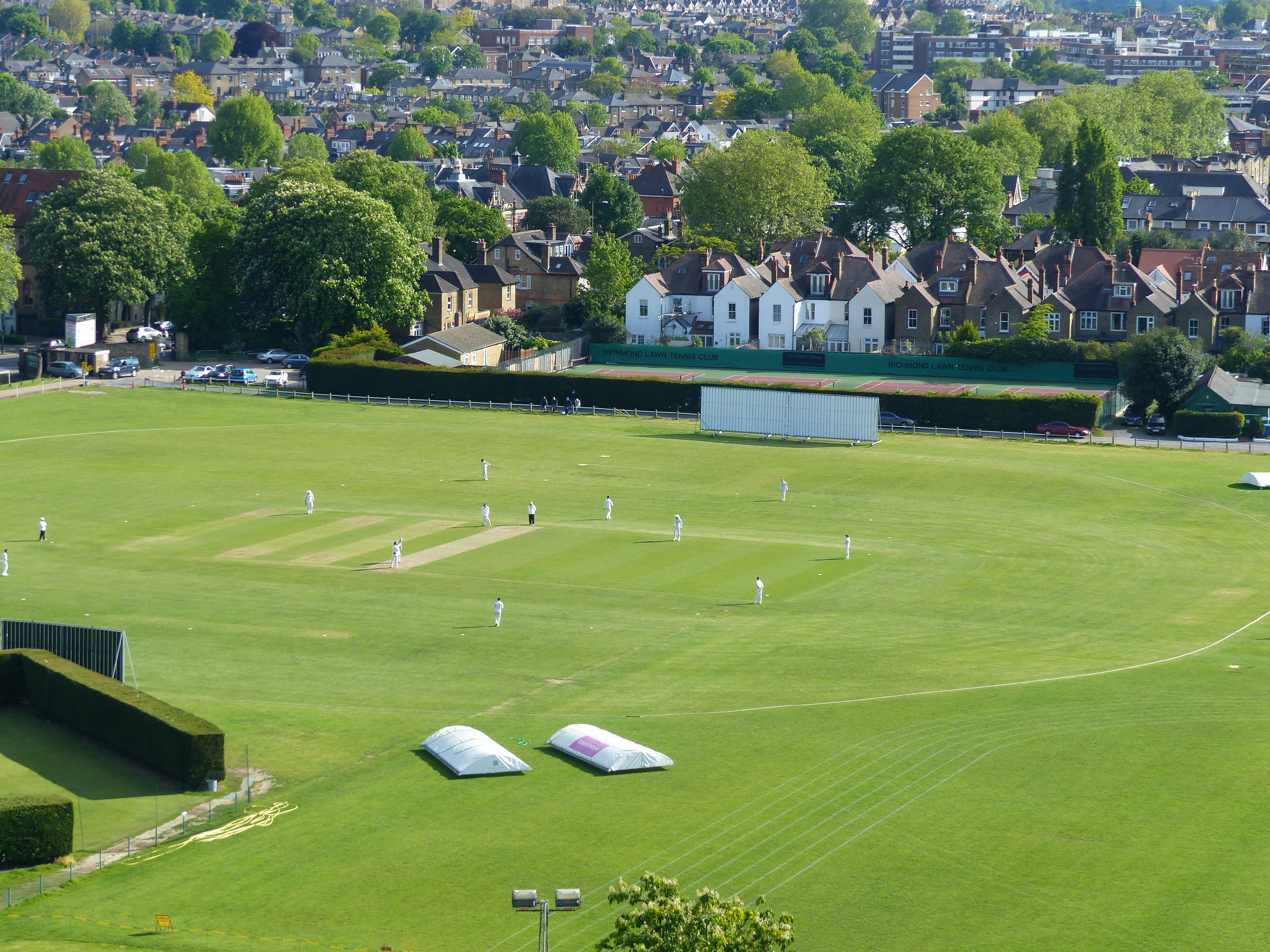
The cricket ground seen from the Pagoda, in 2019

== See also ==
- Richmond Green cricket ground
- Kew Cricket Club
