= Oliver Slipper =

English cricketer

Personal information
- Full name: Oliver Michael Slipper
- Born: 10 March 1976 (age 50); Slough, Berkshire, England
- Batting: Right-handed
- Bowling: Right-arm fast-medium

Domestic team information
- Years: Team
- 2000: Surrey Cricket Board

Career statistics
Competition	LA
Matches	1
Runs scored	26
Batting average	26.00
100s/50s	–/–
Top score	26
Balls bowled	24
Wickets	–
Bowling average	–
5 wickets in innings	–
10 wickets in match	–
Best bowling	–
Catches/stumpings	–/–
- Source: Cricinfo, 30 October 2010

Oliver (Oli) Michael Slipper (born 10 March 1976) is a former English cricketer, a right-handed batsman bowling right-arm fast-medium. He was born in Slough, Berkshire.

Slipper represented the Surrey Cricket Board in a single List A cricket match against Shropshire in the 2000 NatWest Trophy. In his only List A match, he scored 26 runs. He also played for Surrey's Second XI in 1994 and 1995.

He later played club cricket for Weybridge Cricket Club in the Surrey Championship.

Slipper was joint-CEO of Perform Group plc, a digital sports media business, headquartered in the UK.

In June 2023, it was announced that Slipper would become Chair of Surrey from October 2023. He was previously Chair of Oval Invincibles, and remains Executive Chairman of sports marketing agency Pitch International.
