= David Gorrod =

English cricketer

Personal information
- Full name: David Edward Gorrod
- Born: 10 November 1975 (age 51); Wimbledon, London, England
- Batting: Right-handed
- Bowling: Right-arm fast-medium

Domestic team information
- Years: Team
- 2001–2002: Surrey Cricket Board

Career statistics
Competition	LA
Matches	4
Runs scored	66
Batting average	22.00
100s/50s	–/–
Top score	49
Balls bowled	162
Wickets	4
Bowling average	30.00
5 wickets in innings	–
10 wickets in match	–
Best bowling	3/37
Catches/stumpings	–/–
- Source: Cricinfo, 30 October 2010

David Edward Gorrod (born 10 November 1975) is an English cricketer. Gorrod is a right-handed batsman who bowls right-arm fast-medium. He was born in Wimbledon, London.

Gorrod represented the Surrey Cricket Board in List A cricket. His debut List A match came against Huntingdonshire in the 2001 Cheltenham & Gloucester Trophy. From 2001 to 2002, he represented the Board in 4 List A matches, the last of which came against the Essex Cricket Board in the 2nd round of the 2003 Cheltenham & Gloucester Trophy which was held in 2002. In his 4 List A matches, he took 4 wickets at a bowling average of 30.00, with best figures of 3/37.

He currently plays club cricket for Malden Wanderers Cricket Club in the Surrey Championship.
