= North Middlesex Cricket Club =

English cricket club

- League: Middlesex Premier League

Team information
- City: London
- Founded: 1875
- Official website: North Middlesex CC

North Middlesex Cricket Club – sometimes known as North Midd – is a cricket club based in Crouch End, London and plays in the Middlesex County Cricket League. The club's first XI won the MCCL Premier Division title in 2019.

The club fields five men's teams in the MCCL and has a juniors section for girls and boys.

== Past players ==
Former England international Joe Denly played for North Midd in the 2014 season as an allocated player from Middlesex.

Luke Hollman, the Middlesex icon and former England Under-19 all-rounder, began playing at North Midd as a young boy.

Ethan Bamber, who plays for Woracshire also played as a junior for North Midd.

Other Middlesex CCC players who were North Midd colts include Max Harris and Joe Cracknell, who has also played for London Spirit.
