= Max Harris (cricketer) =

English cricketer

Personal information
- Full name: Max Best Harris
- Born: 17 August 2001 (age 25); London, England
- Batting: Right-handed
- Bowling: Right arm fast

Domestic team information
- Years: Team
- 2022: Middlesex (squad no. 44)
- List A debut: 14 August 2022 Middlesex v Somerset
- T20 debut: 1 July 2022 Middlesex v Somerset

Career statistics
Competition	LA	T20
Matches	4	4
Runs scored	27	7
Batting average	13.50	–
100s/50s	0/0	0/0
Top score	12	7*
Balls bowled	234	78
Wickets	7	6
Bowling average	41.28	21.16
5 wickets in innings	0	0
10 wickets in match	0	0
Best bowling	3/98	2/26
Catches/stumpings	0/–	0/–
- Source: Cricinfo, 10 July 2023

Max Best Harris (born 17 August 2001) is an English cricketer who plays for Middlesex County Cricket Club. He is a right-handed batsman and a right-arm fast-medium pace bowler.

== Early life ==
Harris was an accomplished tennis player as a youngster but preferred the mate-ship of team sports. He made his debut for the Middlesex academy at 17 years old.

== Career ==
Harris played for North Middlesex Cricket Club alongside future Middlesex teammates Ethan Bamber, Joe Cracknell and Luke Hollman. Harris was awarded his first professional county contract in April 2021. Harris made his T20 Blast debut for Middlesex against Somerset on 1 July 2022 at Lord's. He took 2 wickets on debut including that of South African international Rilee Rossouw. On his second appearance on the 3 July 2022 against Gloucestershire he again took 2 wickets as he improved his figures to 2/26. Harris made his List-A debut for Middlesex on 14 August 2022 against Somerset, and hit the winning runs in a one wicket victory at Taunton. In July 2023, Middlesex announced he was to be released by the county after taking 13 wickets in eight white ball appearances.
