= Philip Sampson =

English cricketer

Personal information
- Full name: Philip James Sampson
- Born: 6 September 1980 (age 46); Manchester, England
- Batting: Right-handed
- Bowling: Right-arm fast-medium

Domestic team information
- Years: Team
- 2006–2007: Buckinghamshire
- 2000–2005: Surrey
- 2000: Surrey Cricket Board
- 1999: Buckinghamshire

Career statistics
Competition	FC	LA	T20
Matches	5	24	15
Runs scored	91	51	7
Batting average	18.20	6.37	7.00
100s/50s	–/–	–/–	–/–
Top score	42	16	4*
Balls bowled	590	996	264
Wickets	17	23	13
Bowling average	24.41	39.34	28.00
5 wickets in innings	1	–	–
10 wickets in match	–	–	–
Best bowling	5/121	3/42	2/26
Catches/stumpings	–/–	6/–	7/–
- Source: Cricinfo, 30 October 2010

Philip James Sampson (born 6 September 1980) is an English cricketer. Sampson is a right-handed batsman who bowls right-arm fast-medium. He was born at Manchester.

Sampson made his debut in County Cricket during the 1999 season for Buckinghamshire in Minor counties cricket. The following season he made his List A debut for the Surrey Cricket Board against Shropshire in the 2000 NatWest Trophy.

During the 2000 season he also made his debut for Surrey against Nottinghamshire in a List A match in the 2000 Norwich Union National League. From 2000 to 2005, he represented the county in 23 List A matches, the last of which came against Durham in the 2005 totesport League. In his 23 List A matches for the county, he scored 47 runs at a batting average of 5.87, with a high score of 16. In the field he took 5 catches. With the ball he took 23 wickets at a bowling average of 38.21, with best figures of 3/42.

Sampson also represented Surrey in first-class cricket, making his debut for the county in that format against Oxford University in 2002. From 2002 to 2004, he represented the county in 5 first-class matches, the last of which came against Northamptonshire. In those 5 matches, he scored 91 runs at an average of 18.20, with a high score of 42. With the ball he took 17 wickets an average of 24.41, with a single five wicket haul which gave him best figures of 5/121.

With the arrival of Twenty20 cricket in 2003, Sampson made his debut in the inaugural Twenty20 Cup for the county against Middlesex. From 2003 to 2005, he represented the county in 15 Twenty20 matches, the last of which came against Sussex in the 2005 Twenty20 Cup. In his 15 matches, he took 13 wickets at an average of 28.00, with best figures of 2/26. In the field he took 7 catches. Sampson was released by Surrey at the end of the 2005 season.

In 2006, he rejoined Buckinghamshire. From 2006 to 2007, he represented the county in 10 further Minor Counties Championship matches, the last of which came against Hertfordshire. During the same period he also represented the county in 4 further MCCA Knockout Trophy matches, the last of which came against Hertfordshire.

He currently plays club cricket for Sutton Cricket Club in the Surrey Championship.
