= Peter James =

Peter James may refer to:

- Peter James (historian) (1952–2024), British author and historian
- Peter James (writer) (born 1948), British writer of crime fiction and film producer
- Peter Francis James (born 1956), African-American actor and voice-over artist
- Peter James (cinematographer) (born 1947), Australian cinematographer
- Peter James (set decorator) (1924–1997), English set decorator
- Peter James (rugby union) (1935–2021), rugby union player who represented Australia
- Peter James (cricketer) (born 1971), played for Surrey
- Peter Stanley James (1917–1999), Royal Air Force officer
- Peter Wilfred James (1930–2014), English botanist and lichenologist
- Pete James (1958–2018), curator of photography
