= Neil Farnsworth =

English cricketer

Personal information
- Full name: Neil James Farnsworth
- Born: 8 May 1977 (age 49); Ashford, Surrey, England
- Batting: Right-handed
- Bowling: Right-arm off break

Domestic team information
- Years: Team
- 2000: Surrey Cricket Board

Career statistics
Competition	LA
Matches	1
Runs scored	10
Batting average	10.00
100s/50s	–/–
Top score	10
Balls bowled	–
Wickets	–
Bowling average	–
5 wickets in innings	–
10 wickets in match	–
Best bowling	–
Catches/stumpings	–/–
- Source: Cricinfo, 30 October 2010

Neil James Farnsworth (born 8 May 1977) is an English cricketer. Farnsworth is a right-handed batsman who bowls right-arm off break. He was born in Ashford, Surrey.

Farnsworth represented the Surrey Cricket Board in a single List A cricket match against Shropshire County Cricket Club in the 2000 NatWest Trophy. In his only List A match, he scored ten runs.

He last played club cricket for Ashtead Cricket Club in the Surrey Championship.
