= Neil Kendrick =

English cricketer (born 1967)

Personal information
- Full name: Neil Michael Kendrick
- Born: 11 November 1967 (age 59); Bromley, Kent, England
- Nickname: Kendo, Rat, Merson
- Height: 5 ft 10 in (1.78 m)
- Batting: Right-handed
- Bowling: Slow left-arm orthodox
- Role: Bowler

Domestic team information
- Years: Team
- 1999: Surrey Cricket Board
- 1997–1998: Berkshire
- 1994/95-1996: Glamorgan
- 1988–1994: Surrey

Career statistics
Competition	FC	LA
Matches	81	12
Runs scored	1,206	55
Batting average	15.86	18.33
100s/50s	–/4	–/–
Top score	59	24
Balls bowled	14,109	591
Wickets	179	12
Bowling average	38.49	38.91
5 wickets in innings	6	–
10 wickets in match	1	–
Best bowling	7/115	3/21
Catches/stumpings	58/–	3/–
- Source: Cricinfo, 9 October 2010

name NeilNeil Michael Kendrick (born 11 November 1967) is a former English cricketer. Kendrick was a right-handed batsman who bowled slow left-arm orthodox. He was born in Bromley, Kent.

== First-class career ==
He made his debut in County Cricket for Surrey where he made his first-class debut for the county against Cambridge University. His debut in the County Championship came in the same 1989 season against Gloucestershire. From 1988 to 1994, he represented the county in 55 first-class matches, the last of which came against Hampshire in the 1994 County Championship. In his 55 first-class matches for Surrey, he scored 862 runs at a batting average of 16.26, with a 33-halfhalf centuries and a high score of 55. In the field he took 47 catches. With the ball he took 133 wickets for the county at a bowling average of 36.27, with 6 five wicket hauls and a single ten wicket haul in a match. His best figures were 7/115.

In 1990, Kendrick made his List-A debut for the county against Warwickshire in the 1990 Refuge Assurance League. From 1990 to 1994, he represented the county in 10 List-A matches, the last of which came against Hampshire.

For the 1995 season, Kendrick moved to Glamorgan where he made his first-class debut for the county against Matabeleland during Glamorgan's tour of Zimbabwe. His debut in the County Championship came against Somerset in 1995. From 1995 to 1996, he represented the county in 26 first-class matches, the last of which came against Kent. In his 26 first-class matches he scored 344 runs at an average of 14.95, with a single half century which gave him his career high score of 59, which came against Surrey in 1995. With the ball he took 46 wickets at an average of 44.91, with best figures of 4.70. He did not represent the county in List-A cricket.

== Later career ==
After leaving Glamorgan, Kendrick joined Berkshire in 1997. He made his Minor Counties Championship debut for the county against Oxfordshire. From 1997 to 1998, he represented the county in 18 Minor Counties Championship matches, the last of which came against Oxfordshire in the 1998 Minor Counties Championship. He also made his debut in the MCCA Knockout Trophy for Berkshire against Shropshire in 1997. From 1997 to 1998, he represented the county in 5 Trophy matches, the last of which came against the Kent Cricket Board.

He also represented Berkshire in a single List-A cricket against Lancashire in the 1997 NatWest Trophy. Two years later he played his final List-A match while representing the Surrey Cricket Board against Cheshire in the 1999 NatWest Trophy. In his overall career List-A matches, he scored 55 runs at an average of 18.33, with a high score of 24. With the ball he took 12 wickets at an average of 38.91, with best figures of 3/21.

He is now a schoolmaster at Whitgift School where he also coaches cricket.
