= Quentin Ferreira =

South African cricketer

Personal information
- Full name: Quentin Ferreira
- Born: 28 December 1972 (age 53); East London, Cape Province, South Africa
- Batting: Right-handed
- Bowling: Right-arm fast-medium
- Relatives: Dean Ferreira (brother)

Domestic team information
- Years: Team
- 1999: Surrey Cricket Board
- 1998/99: Northerns
- 1998/99: Northerns B
- 1996/97–1997/98: Eastern Province B
- 1996/97–1997/98: Eastern Province

Career statistics
Competition	FC	LA
Matches	18	22
Runs scored	374	128
Batting average	30.15	21.33
100s/50s	–/1	–/–
Top score	63*	34*
Balls bowled	3,016	997
Wickets	57	26
Bowling average	24.38	30.88
5 wickets in innings	–	–
10 wickets in match	–	–
Best bowling	4/17	3/40
Catches/stumpings	5/–	5/–
- Source: Cricinfo, 21 February 2011

Quentin Ferreira (born 28 December 1972) is a South African former cricketer. He was a right-handed batsman who bowled right-arm fast-medium. He was born in East London, Cape Province.

In a professional career that lasted from the 1996/97 to the 1998/99 South African cricket seasons, Ferreira played both the first-class and List A formats of the game with four different sides. Debuting in the 1996/97 season for Eastern Province, he proceeded to play first-class and List A cricket for Eastern Province B, Northerns B and Northerns. He later played List A cricket in England for the Surrey Cricket Board in 1999, making two appearances in the 1999 NatWest Trophy against Norfolk in the first round and Cheshire in the second round.

In his first-class career, he played 18 times scoring 374 runs at a batting average of 23/37, with a single half century high score of 63 not out. A bowling all rounder, Ferreira took 57 wickets at a bowling average of 24.38, with best figures of 4/17. He played nearly an equal number of List A matches, playing 22. In these he scored 128 runs at an average of 21.33, with a high score of 34 not out. With the ball he took 26 wickets at an average 30.88, with best figures of 3/40. In the field he took 5 catches.

His older brother, Dean, represented Orange Free State at first-class and List A level.
