= Richard Johnson (cricketer, born 1979) =

English cricketer

Personal information
- Full name: Richard Kurt Johnson
- Born: 4 July 1979 (age 47); Croydon, Surrey, England
- Batting: Left-handed
- Bowling: Right-arm fast

Domestic team information
- Years: Team
- 2001–2002: Surrey Cricket Board

Career statistics
Competition	LA
Matches	3
Runs scored	24
Batting average	12.00
100s/50s	–/–
Top score	12*
Balls bowled	60
Wickets	–
Bowling average	–
5 wickets in innings	–
10 wickets in match	–
Best bowling	–
Catches/stumpings	1/–
- Source: Cricinfo, 28 October 2010

Richard Kurt Johnson (born 4 July 1979) is a former English cricketer. Johnson was a left-handed batsman who bowled right-arm fast. He was born at Croydon, Surrey.

Johnson represented the Surrey Cricket Board in 3 List A matches, the first of which came against Lincolnshire in the 2nd round of the 2002 Cheltenham & Gloucester Trophy which was played in 2001. His final 2 List A matches came against the Gloucestershire Cricket Board and the Essex Cricket Board in the 1st and 2nd rounds of the 2003 Cheltenham & Gloucester Trophy which were held in 2002. In his 3 List A matches, he scored 24 runs at a batting average of 12.00, with a high score of 12*. In the field he took a single catch.
