= Max Hall (cricketer) =

English cricketer

Personal information
- Full name: Maximillian Palmer Hall
- Born: 29 September 1975 (age 51); Surrey, England
- Batting: Right-handed
- Bowling: Right-arm off break

Domestic team information
- Years: Team
- 2001–2002: Surrey Cricket Board

Career statistics
Competition	LA
Matches	3
Runs scored	18
Batting average	9.00
100s/50s	–/–
Top score	14*
Balls bowled	–
Wickets	–
Bowling average	–
5 wickets in innings	–
10 wickets in match	–
Best bowling	–
Catches/stumpings	3/–
- Source: Cricinfo, 28 October 2010

Maximillian 'Max' Palmer Hall (born 29 September 1975) is an English cricketer. Hall is a right-handed batsman who bowls right-arm off break. He was born in Surrey.

Hall represented the Surrey Cricket Board in 3 List A matches, the first of which came against Lincolnshire in the 2nd round of the 2002 Cheltenham & Gloucester Trophy which was played in 2001. His final 2 List A matches came against the Gloucestershire Cricket Board and the Essex Cricket Board in the 1st and 2nd rounds of the 2003 Cheltenham & Gloucester Trophy which were held in 2002. In his 3 List A matches, he scored 18 runs at a batting average of 9.00, with a high score of 14*. In the field he took 3 catches.

He currently plays club cricket for Sunbury Cricket Club.
