= Richard Bowers (cricketer) =

English cricketer

Personal information
- Full name: Richard Brian Bowers
- Born: 16 June 1976 (age 50); Redhill, Surrey, England
- Batting: Right-handed
- Bowling: Right-arm medium-fast

Domestic team information
- Years: Team
- 2001–2002: Surrey Cricket Board

Career statistics
Competition	LA
Matches	4
Runs scored	4
Batting average	4.00
100s/50s	–/–
Top score	2*
Balls bowled	168
Wickets	6
Bowling average	24.83
5 wickets in innings	–
10 wickets in match	–
Best bowling	3/50
Catches/stumpings	–/–
- Source: Cricinfo, 30 October 2010

Richard Brian Bowers (born 16 June 1976) is an English cricketer. Bowers is a right-handed batsman who bowls right-arm medium-fast. He was born in Redhill, Surrey.

Mansfield represented the Surrey Cricket Board in List A cricket. His debut List A match came against Surrey in the 2001 Cheltenham & Gloucester Trophy. From 2001 to 2002, he represented the Board in 4 List A matches, the last of which came against the Essex Cricket Board in the 2nd round of the 2003 Cheltenham & Gloucester Trophy which was held in 2002. In his 4 List A matches, he took 6 wickets at a bowling average of 24.83, with best figures of 3/50.
