= Sam Andrews =

English cricketer

Personal information
- Full name: Sam Andrews
- Born: 3 February 1982 (age 44); Hammersmith, London
- Batting: Left-handed
- Bowling: Left-arm medium

Domestic team information
- Years: Team
- Surrey Cricket Board

Career statistics
Competition	List A
Matches	1
Runs scored	0
Batting average	0
100s/50s	0/0
Top score	0
Balls bowled	36
Wickets	0
Bowling average	–
5 wickets in innings	–
10 wickets in match	–
Best bowling	–
Catches/stumpings	0/–
- Source: , 12 August 2008

Sam Andrews (born 3 February 1982) is an English List A cricketer who played his only match for Surrey Cricket Board. His only List A game was against Surrey County Cricket Club. he scored 0 and did not get a wicket after bowling 6 overs. He played 8 Second XI championship games for Surrey's Second XI team. and 2 games for Surrey's Second XI in the Second XI trophy.

He also played two games for Surrey Cricket board in the Minor Counties Trophy.
