= Timothy Carter (cricketer) =

English cricketer

Personal information
- Full name: Timothy Jolyon Carter
- Born: 21 September 1969 (age 57); Tiverton, Devon, England
- Batting: Right-handed
- Bowling: Leg break

Domestic team information
- Years: Team
- 1999–2001: Surrey Cricket Board

Career statistics
Competition	LA
Matches	4
Runs scored	47
Batting average	11.75
100s/50s	–/–
Top score	29
Balls bowled	–
Wickets	–
Bowling average	–
5 wickets in innings	–
10 wickets in match	–
Best bowling	–
Catches/stumpings	2/–
- Source: Cricinfo, 31 October 2010

Timothy Jolyon Carter (born 21 September 1969) is a former English cricketer. Carter was a right-handed batsman who bowled leg break. He was born in Tiverton, Devon.

Carter represented the Surrey Cricket Board in List A cricket. His debut List A match came against Norfolk in the 1999 NatWest Trophy. From 1999 to 2001, he represented the board in four List A matches, the last of which came against Lincolnshire in the second round of the 2002 Cheltenham & Gloucester Trophy which was held in 2001. In his four List A matches, he scored 47 runs at a batting average of 11.75, with a high score of 29. In the field he took two catches.
