= Mitcham Cricket Green =

Park and cricket ground in Mitcham, London, England

Coordinates: 51°24′4″N 0°10′1.8″W

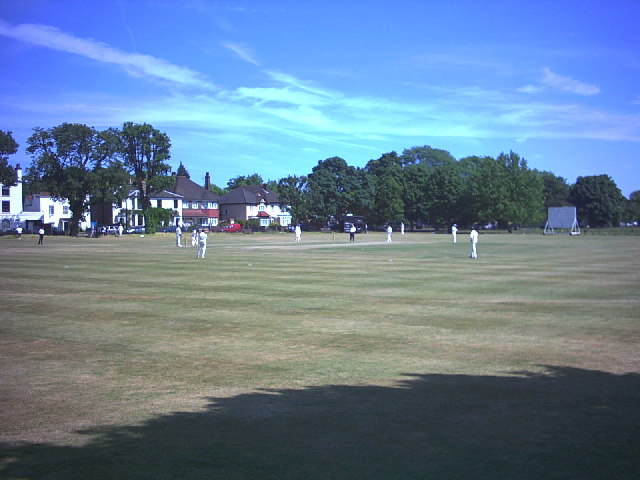
- Cricket match on Mitcham Cricket Green
- Interactive map of Mitcham Cricket Green
- Location: Mitcham, Merton (previously Surrey)
- Home club: Mitcham Cricket Club
- County club: Surrey CCC Second XI
- Establishment: 1685

Mitcham Cricket Green is a cricket ground in Mitcham, south London (historically in Surrey). It is the home of Mitcham Cricket Club and is reportedly the oldest cricket ground still in use, having been used for cricket since 1685.

== History ==
In the 19th century, the Australian cricket team would stay at The Cricketers pub which formerly overlooked the green and practise on the green whilst on tour. The pub was used as the "pavilion" for the matches on the Cricket Green up until the current pavilion was built in at the beginning of the 20th Century, the scorer having a position on the balcony of the inn. The Cricketers pub was destroyed by an incendiary bomb in WW2 (which fell between the pub and the adjacent Vestry Hall - which still stands). A replacement pub was built post-war, but has since been demolished and there is a block of flats on the site. The present pavilion was built in 1904 and is rare in being one of only a few cricket pavilions to be separated from the ground by a road, (the A239).

Surrey County Cricket Club first used the ground in 1949 for a match in the Minor Counties Championship. Surrey continued to use the ground for 2nd XI matches until 1973. Its first usage in the Second XI Championship was for a match in 1959. Surrey have never used Mitcham for an important match.

In September 1919 the Green hosted a Mitcham v Australian Imperial Forces XI match (the final game of the AIF XI tour of England), the Australian team on the day included 3 players who subsequently played Test cricket for Australia. In 2019 Mitcham CC hosted a team from the Australian Embassy to commemorate the centenary of this match. The match on the Green which is reputed to have drawn the biggest crowd was a women's game Surrey v Australia in 1937 where press reports suggest that a crowd in excess of 10,000 was present. This was the last game of the Australia tour. Women's cricket has been played regularly on the Green, including a warm up game for the 1973 World Cup (Surrey v Jamaica). The most notable match of recent times was the Golden Jubilee Challenge Match, a match held between Mitcham and Hambledon Club, two of the oldest clubs in the country, in honour of the Golden Jubilee of Elizabeth II. Ian Botham made a guest appearance with the Queen's Jubilee Baton. The match was a two innings affair.

== Local government ==
The Cricket Green also lends its name to the nearby area, and is a Conservation area and council ward.
