= James Clutterbuck =

English cricketer

Personal information
- Full name: James Clutterbuck
- Born: 18 August 1973 (age 53); Sandown, Isle of Wight, England
- Batting: Right-handed
- Bowling: Right-arm medium

Domestic team information
- Years: Team
- 1999: Surrey Cricket Board

Career statistics
Competition	LA
Matches	1
Runs scored	11
Batting average	11.00
100s/50s	–/–
Top score	11
Balls bowled	–
Wickets	–
Bowling average	–
5 wickets in innings	–
10 wickets in match	–
Best bowling	–
Catches/stumpings	–/–
- Source: Cricinfo, 30 October 2010

James Clutterbuck (born 18 August 1973) is a former English cricketer. Clutterbuck was a right-handed batsman who bowled right-arm medium pace. He was born in Sandown on the Isle of Wight.

Clutterbuck represented the Surrey Cricket Board in a single List A cricket match against Norfolk in the 1999 NatWest Trophy. In his only List A match, he scored 11 runs. Clutterbuck scored one of the fastest centuries on record at Arundel cricket ground in an innings for the Earl of Arundel's XI v Cambridge University in 1999 in an innings of 130 off 66 balls. He also represented both Glamorgan and Gloucestershire 2nd XIs during the 1990s.
