= Mark Kenlock =

English cricketer

Personal information
- Full name: Stratford Garfield Kenlock
- Born: 16 April 1965 (age 61); Portland, Jamaica
- Nickname: "kenny aka fast n nasty"
- Batting: Left-handed
- Bowling: Left-arm slow-n-floaty
- Relatives: Myles Kenlock (son)

Domestic team information
- Years: Team
- 1999-2000: Surrey Cricket Board
- 1994-1996: Surrey

Career statistics
Competition	FC	LA
Matches	7	24
Runs scored	55	18
Batting average	6.87	3.60
100s/50s	–/–	–/–
Top score	12	9
Balls bowled	1,104	1,076
Wickets	11	33
Bowling average	60.54	27.30
5 wickets in innings	–	1
10 wickets in match	–	–
Best bowling	3/104	5/15
Catches/stumpings	4/–	6/–
- Source: Cricinfo, 31 October 2010

Stratford Garfield Kenlock (born 16 April 1965) and often referred to by the first name of Mark, is a former English cricketer. He was a left-handed batsman who bowled left-arm fast-medium. He was born at Portland, Surrey County in Jamaica.

Kenlock made his first-class for Surrey (England) against Oxford University in 1994. From 1994 to 1996, he represented the county in 7 first-class matches, the last of which came against South Africa A. In his 7 first-class matches, he took 11 wickets at a bowling average of 60.54, with best figures of 3/104.

His debut in List A cricket for the county against Nottinghamshire in the 1994 AXA Equity and Law League. From 1994 to 1995, he represented the county in 21 List A matches, the last of which came against Hampshire in the 1995 AXA Equity and Law League. In his 21 List A matches for the county he took 30 wickets at a bowling average of 26.56, with a single five wicket haul which gave him best figures of 5/15.

Kenlock made his List A debut for the Surrey Cricket Board in 1999 against Norfolk and Cheshire in the 1999 NatWest Trophy. He played a further match for the Board against Shropshire in the 2000 NatWest Trophy.
