= Richmond Cricket Club (London) =

- League: Middlesex Premier League

Personnel
- Captain: Adam London

Team information
- City: London
- Founded: 1862
- Home ground: Old Deer Park

History
- Middlesex Premier League wins: 2 (4 incl. old top division)
- Official website: RichmondCC

Richmond Cricket Club is based in Richmond with its home venue in the Old Deer Park. The club was founded in 1862 and now plays in the Middlesex County Cricket League as one of London's largest and most successful amateur clubs.

== League cricket ==
Although Richmond was historically part of Surrey, the club is a member of the Middlesex County Cricket League. When league cricket for clubs around London came into existence, most of Richmond's regular opponents were from North / West London and they therefore joined them in the creation of the Middlesex League, rather than play teams from South London in the Surrey Championship.

The Old Deer Park has hosted a number of Middlesex games.

As of the 2023 season, Richmond compete in the Middlesex Premier League, which it won twice (in 2004 and 2018). It was also champions twice (1989 and 1998) in the years before the creation of the Premier League.

== Past players ==
The Australia international Adam Gilchrist spent a season playing for Richmond in 1989, before he had made his first-class debut. In 2004 a scholarship was set up in his name to allow other young Australian players the chance to have the same experience.
