= Ian Bishop (English cricketer) =

English cricketer

Personal information
- Full name: Ian Emlyn Bishop
- Born: 26 August 1977 (age 49); Taunton, Somerset, England
- Batting: Right-handed
- Bowling: Right-arm fast

Domestic team information
- Years: Team
- 1995–1997: Somerset
- 1998–2004: Devon
- 1999–2000: Surrey
- First-class debut: 3 July 1996 Somerset v Pakistanis
- Last First-class: 2 May 2000 Surrey v Durham
- List A debut: 24 June 1998 Devon v Yorkshire
- Last List A: 26 May 2004 Devon v Yorkshire

Career statistics
Competition	First-class	List A
Matches	7	18
Runs scored	25	32
Batting average	4.16	10.66
100s/50s	0/0	0/0
Top score	12	15*
Balls bowled	690	823
Wickets	7	18
Bowling average	53.71	32.77
5 wickets in innings	0	0
10 wickets in match	0	n/a
Best bowling	2/45	4/34
Catches/stumpings	4/–	1/–
- Source: CricketArchive, 9 July 2011

Ian Emlyn Bishop (born 26 August 1977) is an English cricketer who played first-class cricket for Somerset and Surrey and List A cricket for Devon, Surrey, and the Surrey Cricket Board between 1996 and 2004. He was born in Taunton, Somerset.

A tail-end batsman and a right-arm fast bowler, Bishop played for Somerset's second eleven from 1995 but made only one first-team appearance, the match against the 1996 Pakistan touring team and he failed to take a wicket in that. Bishop left Somerset after a year in the second team in 1997; in 1998 he played Minor Counties cricket for Devon and made his List A debut in the NatWest Trophy match against Yorkshire, without success. In the second half of the 1998 season, he began playing second-team matches for Surrey and in 1999, after appearing in the Surrey Cricket Board side in the first round of the NatWest Trophy one-day competition, he appeared in several Surrey first-team games in the Sunday League, taking four wickets for 34 runs, his best List A figures, in the game against Durham. He was less successful in a handful of first-class matches for the Surrey first team, with best bowling figures of two wickets for 45 runs in the game against Derbyshire. There were a few further List A and first-class matches for Bishop in 2000 but he did not improve on these figures and after a few second-eleven matches in 2001 he left the Surrey staff. He resumed playing Minor Counties cricket with Devon and that brought further List A appearances between 2002 and 2004.
