= Mitcham Cricket Club =

Historical English cricket team

Coordinates: 51.4005°N 0.1665°W

Personnel
- Captain: Harris Hussain
- Coach: Peter White Young

Team information
- Founded: 1685
- Home ground: Mitcham Cricket Green

History
- Surrey Championship wins: 4
- Official website: mitchamcricketclub.org/

Mitcham Cricket Club is reported to be the oldest cricket club in existence, with the club having played on Mitcham Cricket Green since 1685. The club was reportedly watched by Lord Nelson during his time in the area.

Four players from the club have played for the England cricket team, fast bowler Tom Richardson; batsman Andy Sandham; wicket-keeper Bert Strudwick, and opening batsman David Smith, who played for Mitcham CC at Colts level. The ladies team was the local club for Molly Hide, who captained England for 17 years and later became president of the Women's Cricket Association.

The club's pavilion is, unusually, separated from the ground by a road.

== History ==
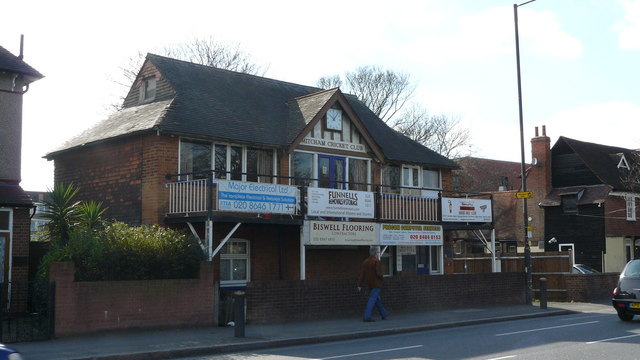
Mitcham Cricket Club pavilion. The green itself is behind the photographer.

The earliest known cricket match played by Mitcham against another team is recorded to be played in 1707 against All-London.

In 1968, Mitcham became a founding member of the Surrey Championship. Till date, the team has been league champions on 4 separate occasions, having won the title in 1970, 1971, 1973, and 1978.

The club's 1st XI team currently plays in Division 6 Central of the Surrey Championship. Moreover, the club runs several other teams, including 2nd and 3rd XI teams, as well as junior and women's teams.
