= Efren Cruz =

English cricketer

Personal information
- Full name: Efren Pablioto Cruz
- Born: 27 May 1981 (age 45); Hammersmith, London, England
- Batting: Right-handed
- Role: Wicketkeeper

Domestic team information
- Years: Team
- 2001–2002: Surrey Cricket Board

Career statistics
| Competition | LA |
|---|---|
| Matches | 5 |
| Runs scored | 24 |
| Batting average | 8.00 |
| 100s/50s | –/– |
| Top score | 11 |
| Balls bowled | – |
| Wickets | – |
| Bowling average | – |
| 5 wickets in innings | – |
| 10 wickets in match | – |
| Best bowling | – |
| Catches/stumpings | 1/2 |
- Source: Cricinfo, 13 September 2010

Efren Pablioto Cruz (born 27 May 1981) is a former English List A cricketer. A right-handed batsman who played primarily as a wicketkeeper, he was born at Hammersmith, London.

Cruz made his List-A debut for Surrey Cricket Board against Huntingdonshire in the 2nd round of the 2001 Cheltenham & Gloucester Trophy. Between 2001 and 2002, he played 5 List-A matches, the last of which for the Surrey Cricket Board came against the Essex Cricket Board at Chelmsford in the 2nd round of the 2003 Cheltenham & Gloucester Trophy which was played in 2002. In his 5 List-A matches, he scored 24 runs at a batting average of 8.00, with a high score of 11. Behind the stumps he took a single catch and made 2 stumpings.

Between 1999 and 2000, he also represented the Surrey Second XI in the Second XI Championship and Second XI Trophy a combined total of 12 times.
