= Joe Porter (cricketer) =

English cricketer (born 1980)

Personal information
- Full name: Joseph James Porter
- Born: 5 May 1980 (age 46); Hammersmith, London, England
- Batting: Left-handed
- Bowling: Slow left-arm orthodox

Domestic team information
- Years: Team
- 2005-2006: Oxfordshire
- 2002: Surrey Cricket Board
- 2001: Surrey
- 2000-2002: Oxford University

Career statistics
Competition	FC	LA
Matches	12	2
Runs scored	522	119
Batting average	26.10	59.50
100s/50s	–/4	–/1
Top score	93	96
Balls bowled	248	60
Wickets	6	4
Bowling average	34.33	12.75
5 wickets in innings	–	–
10 wickets in match	–	–
Best bowling	3/50	4/51
Catches/stumpings	7/–	1/–
- Source: Cricinfo, 28 October 2010

Joseph James Porter (born 5 May 1980) is an English cricketer. Porter is a left-handed batsman who bowls slow left-arm orthodox. He was born at Hammersmith, London.

Porter made his first-class debut for Oxford University against Somerset in 2000. From 2000 to 2002, he represented the University in 9 first-class matches, the last of which came against Northamptonshire. His final first-class match came for a British Universities team against the touring Sri Lankans. In his 12 career first-class matches, he scored 522 runs at a batting average of 26.10, with 4 half centuries and a high score of 96. In the field, he took 7 catches, while with the ball he took 6 wickets at a bowling average of 34.33, with best figures of 3/50.

In 2001, he represented Surrey in a single List A match against Northamptonshire. The following season he represented the Surrey Cricket Board in a single List A match against the Gloucestershire Cricket Board in the 1st round of the 2003 Cheltenham & Gloucester Trophy which was played in 2002. In his only match for the Board, he scored his career high List A score, by making 96 runs. In his 2 matches, he scored a total of 119 runs at an average of 59.50, while in the field he took a single catch. With the ball, he took 4 wickets at an average of 12.75, with best figures of 4/51.

In 2005, Porter joined Oxfordshire. His debut for the county came in the Minor Counties Championship against Wiltshire. During the 2005 season, he represented the county in 5 Championship matches, the last of which came against Dorset. He also represented the county in a single MCCA Knockout Trophy match against Hertfordshire.
