= Aidan Baker (cricketer) =

English cricketer (born 1964)

Personal information
- Full name: Aidan Francis Baker
- Born: 31 December 1964 (age 61); Blackburn, Lancashire, England
- Batting: Right-handed
- Bowling: Right-arm fast-medium

Domestic team information
- Years: Team
- 2002: Surrey Cricket Board
- 2000: Berkshire
- 1998–1999: Suffolk
- 1996–1997: Berkshire

Career statistics
Competition	LA
Matches	2
Runs scored	1
Batting average	1.00
100s/50s	–/–
Top score	1*
Balls bowled	97
Wickets	2
Bowling average	54.50
5 wickets in innings	–
10 wickets in match	–
Best bowling	2/67
Catches/stumpings	–/–
- Source: Cricinfo, 27 October 2010

Aidan Francis Baker (born 31 December 1964) is a former English cricketer. Baker was a right-handed batsman who bowled right-arm fast-medium. He was born at Blackburn, Lancashire.

Baker made his debut in County Cricket for Berkshire in the 1996 Minor Counties Championship against Cornwall. From 1996 to 1997, he represented the county in 4 Championship matches.

In 1998, he joined Suffolk County Cricket Club, making his debut for the county in the Minor Counties Championship against Buckinghamshire. From 1998 to 1999, he represented the county in 8 Championship matches, the last of which came against Cumberland. He also made his debut in the MCCA Knockout Trophy with the county in a match against the Essex Cricket Board. From 1998 to 1999, he represented the county in 4 Trophy matches, the last of which came against Cambridgeshire. Baker represented the county in a single List A match against the Hampshire Cricket Board in the 1999 NatWest Trophy.

Returning to Berkshire in 2000, he represented the county in a single Minor Counties Championship match against Herefordshire. He also played 2 MCCA Knockout Trophy matches against the Essex Cricket Board and Herefordshire.

Baker later represented the Surrey Cricket Board in a single List A match against the Essex Cricket Board in the 2nd round of the 2003 Cheltenham & Gloucester Trophy which was held in 2002. In his 2 List A matches, he scored a single run and with the ball he took 2 wickets at a bowling average of 33.50, with best figures of 2/67.
