= Noel Brett =

English cricketer

Personal information
- Full name: Noel Adrian Brett
- Born: 8 September 1975 (age 51); Aldershot, Hampshire, England
- Batting: Right-handed
- Bowling: Right-arm off break

Domestic team information
- Years: Team
- 2002: Surrey Cricket Board

Career statistics
Competition	LA
Matches	2
Runs scored	2
Batting average	2.00
100s/50s	–/–
Top score	2
Balls bowled	114
Wickets	1
Bowling average	129.00
5 wickets in innings	–
10 wickets in match	–
Best bowling	1/48
Catches/stumpings	–/–
- Source: Cricinfo, 28 October 2010

Noel Adrian Brett (born 8 September 1975) is a former English cricketer. Brett was a right-handed batsman who bowled right-arm off break. He was born at Aldershot, Hampshire.

Brett represented the Surrey Cricket Board in List A matches against the Gloucestershire Cricket Board and the Essex Cricket Board in the 1st and 2nd rounds of the 2003 Cheltenham & Gloucester Trophy which was played in 2002. In his 2 List A matches, he scored 2 runs at a batting average of 2.00, with a high score of 2. With the ball he took a single wickets at a bowling average of 129.00, with best figures of 1/48.

He appeared on the game show You Bet! with the challenge to run out 20 unguarded wickets within two minutes. He succeeded with 14 seconds to spare.
