= Hampstead Cricket Club =

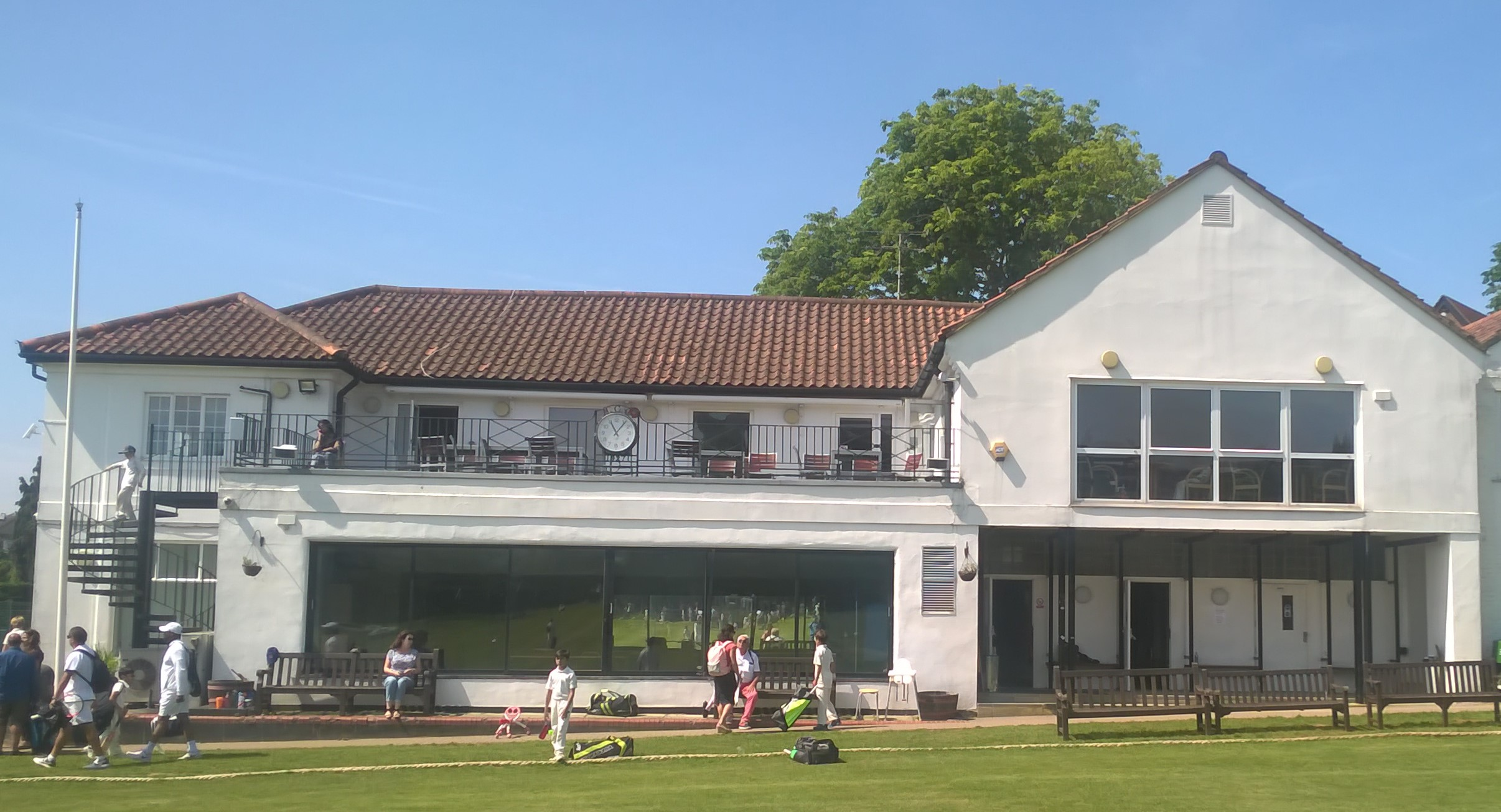
- Clubhouse at Hampstead Cricket Club
- League: Middlesex Premier League

Personnel
- 1st XI captain: Sam Fraser
- 2nd XI captain: Rishi Sharma
- Chairman: Nick Brown

Team information
- City: London
- Founded: 1865
- Home ground: Lymington Road, Hampstead

History
- Middlesex Premier League wins: 2
- ECB National Club Cricket Championship wins: 1

Hampstead Cricket Club is a cricket club in London. The team was formed in 1865, and have played their home games at Lymington Road in West Hampstead since 1877. They were forced to relocate from their previous home due to the construction of Priory Road. The men's 1st XI play in the Middlesex First Division and have won the Premier Division twice, most recently in 2015. The men's 2nd XI have also won their league twice, most recently in 2022 and the men's 3rd XI have won 4 times.

== Past players ==
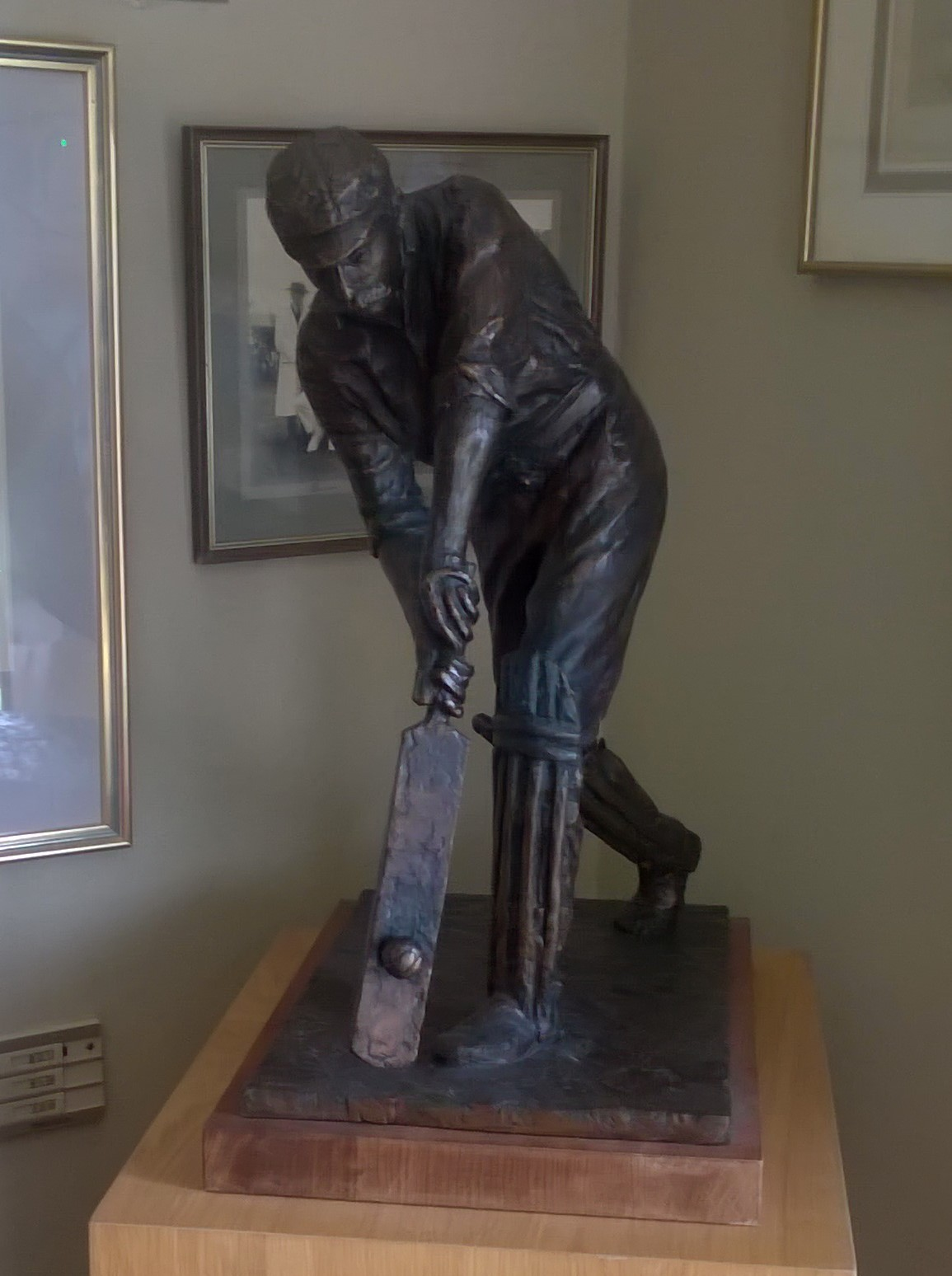
Statue commemorating Stoddard's score of 485, in the clubhouse at Hampstead.

In 1886, future England captain Andrew Stoddart scored a then record 485 in one day for Hampstead against Stoics. A statue of Stoddart commemorating this event was unveiled by former England captain Andrew Strauss as part of the club's 150th anniversary celebrations in 2015.

Leading nineteenth-century Australia bowler Fred Spofforth played for the club between 1891 and 1905, taking 951 wickets.

Japanese international cricketer Shizuka Miyaji played for the Women's 1st XI in the 2019 season. She scored 146 runs in a league match against Ashford Cricket Club, setting a new club record for the highest individual score by a woman.

== Honours ==
- 1969 – DH Robins Cup
- 2013 – ECB Middlesex Premier League Champions
- 2015 – ECB Middlesex Premier League Champions
- 2018 – Women's Cricket Southern League (Collins Division) Champions

== Teams ==
As of the start of the 2026 season, Hampstead field six senior men's teams in Saturday league cricket, and two senior women's teams in Sunday league cricket. The men's 2nd and 3rd XIs play in the top division of their respective Middlesex League competitions, whilst the women's 1st XI plays in the top division of the Southern League. They also field an Under-21s Middlesex Development League team and numerous age-group teams for both boys and girls.

== Mens' First XI league records ==
Hampstead joined the Middlesex County Cricket League in 1980 and since then the following records have been set:

- Highest Team Score : 416–7 dec v Kenton at Lymington Road in 2024
- Lowest Team Score : 38 v Finchley in 1981
- Highest Individual Score : 206* – Paul Weekes v Uxbridge at Lymington Road in 2003
- Most Runs in a Season : 961 – Mark Harvey in 2003
- Best Bowling : 9/28 – Andrew Lamb v Teddington at Lymington Road in 2006
- Most Wickets in a Season : 51 – Paul Weekes in 2008
