= Ealing Cricket Club Ground =

Cricket ground in Ealing, London, England

Corfton Road
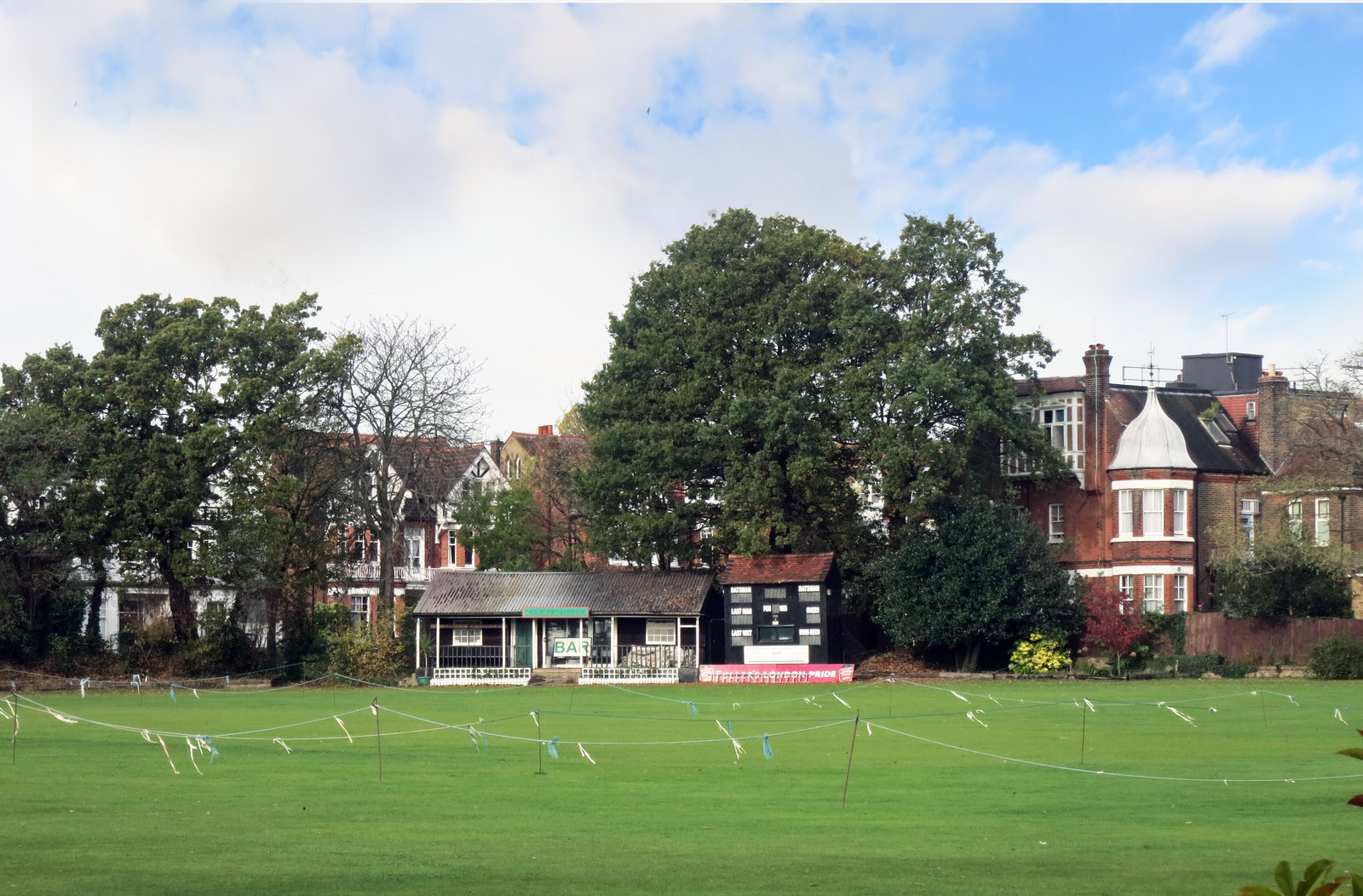

Ground information
- Location: Ealing, London Borough of Ealing
- Coordinates: 51.519°N 0.297°W
- Home club: Ealing Cricket Club
- Establishment: 1874

International information
- First WODI: 4 July 1973: Jamaica v Trinidad and Tobago
- Last WODI: 29 July 1993: England v Netherlands

Team information
Ealing Cricket Club	(1874–present)
Middlesex Second XI	(1935–2011)
- As of 6 September 2020; Source: CricketArchive

Ealing Cricket Club Ground, also known as Corfton Road, is a cricket ground in Ealing, West London. The first recorded match on the ground was in 1874, when Ealing Cricket Club played MCC. The ground, which was formerly in Middlesex, was the venue for over 50 Middlesex Second XI fixtures between 1935 and 2011 and was used by Middlesex Cricket Board for one match in 2002.

In 1973, the ground held its first Women's One Day International when Jamaica played Trinidad and Tobago in the 1973 Women's Cricket World Cup. Two further Women's ODIs were held on the ground during the 1993 Women's Cricket World Cup, with India playing New Zealand and England played the Netherlands.

In local domestic cricket, the ground is the main home venue of Ealing Cricket Club who play in the Middlesex County Cricket League. It is located 500 metres (550 yd) north-east of Ealing Broadway railway station at the heart of an area of late-Victorian villa-style houses built around the ground in the Arts and Crafts style during the 1880s and 1890s.
