= East Molesey Cricket Club =

Cricket club in Surrey, England

- League: Surrey Championship (Premier Division)

Personnel
- Captain: Tom Cullen

Team information
- Founded: 1871
- Home ground: The Memorial Ground, Graburn Way; East Molesey, Surrey

History
- Surrey Championship wins: 4
- Official website: www.eastmoleseycc.com

East Molesey Cricket Club is a cricket club in Molesey, Surrey, England. It was established in 1871, although cricket has been played at the Moulsey Hurst since 1731. A 1953 souvenir programme from the 1953 Australian cricket tour mentions an article in The Daily Courant from 1723 reporting on match played at Moulsey Hurst "between the Gentlemen of London and the Gentlemen of Surrey", and that after the match the players were entertained at Hampton Court Palace by Frederick, Prince of Wales".

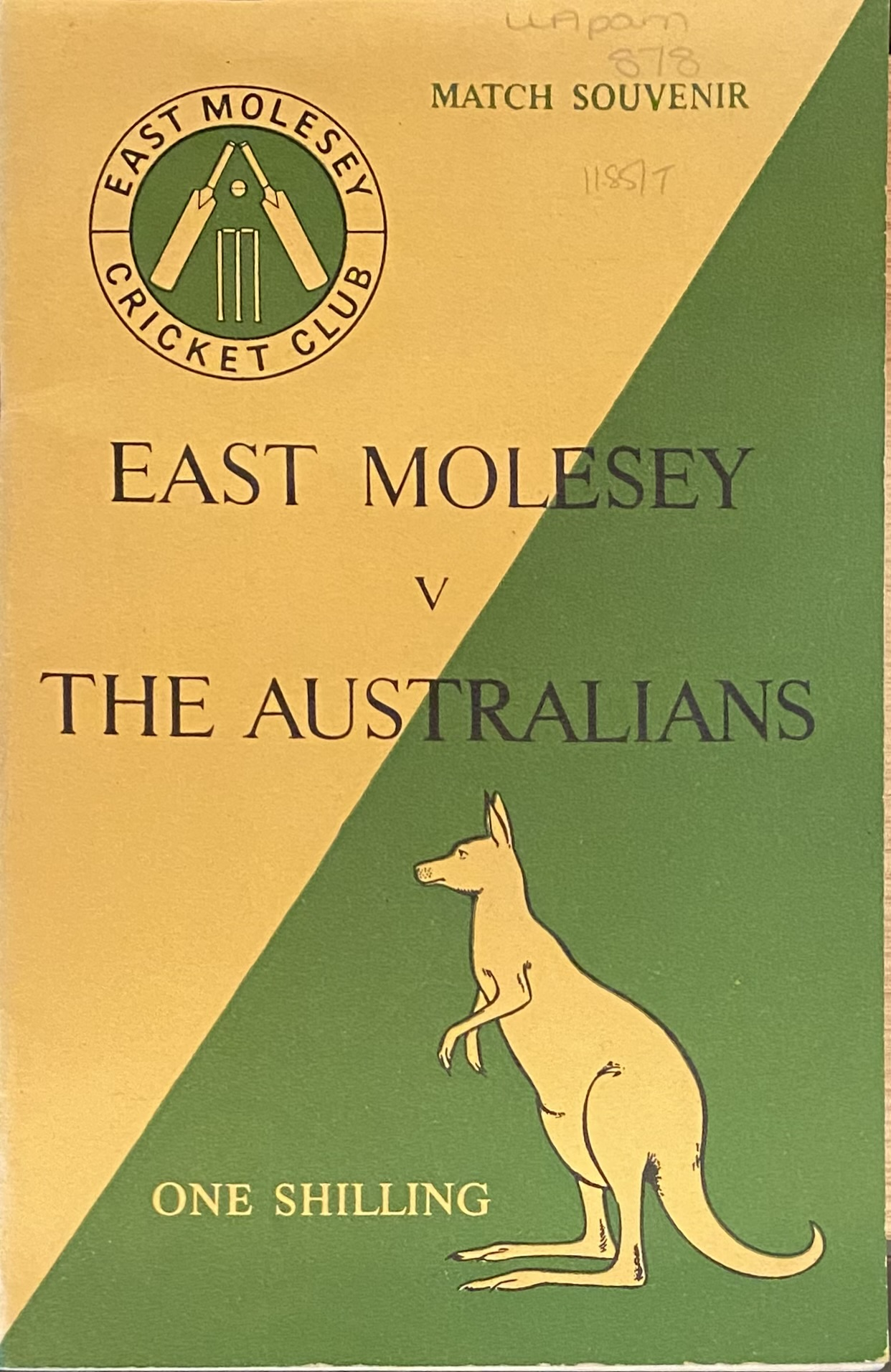
Cover of the souvenir programme of The Australian Cricket Team's match against East Molesey Cricket Club on 26 April 1953. (Edition held in the National Library of Australia, Bib ID: 1746729.

East Molesey's current ground, 'The Memorial Ground', has been the home for the Surrey club since the late 19th century and is just outside the town centre, on the bank of the River Thames. They currently compete in the Surrey Championship, the Club Cricket Conference Cup, the Bertie Joel Cup and the Thameside Sunday League.

== History ==
In 1795, the first ever recorded LBW decision was made at Moulsey Hurst, 500 metres from the site of the current ground.

According to the East Molesey v. The Australians souvenir booklet from 1953: "Unlike the average woman a cricket club does not object to divulging its age; indeed when a club has as long a history as East Molesey it tightly prides itself on the date of its birth. Alas! it is not possible to give the exact year that the East Molesey Club was formed, but that it is one of the oldest clubs is beyond dispute, and cricket has been played on or very near the present ground for over 250 years."

In the 1950s, East Molesey played host to both the Australian cricket team and the New Zealand cricket team in warm up matches during their respective tours of England.

More recently, in 2003 the club organised a game with Lashings, in which many former test players took part, including Mark Waugh, Richie Richardson and Chris Harris.

In 2011 the club was promoted back into the ECB Premier Division for the 2012 season, and won the Surrey Championship title in 1980, 2019, 2021 and 2024.
