= Richard Mansfield (cricketer) =

Indian-born English cricketer

Personal information
- Full name: Richard James Mansfield
- Born: 21 January 1975 (age 51); Madras, Tamil Nadu, India
- Batting: Right-handed
- Bowling: Right-arm off break

Domestic team information
- Years: Team
- 2001-2002: Surrey Cricket Board

Career statistics
Competition	LA
Matches	3
Runs scored	46
Batting average	15.33
100s/50s	–/–
Top score	40
Balls bowled	66
Wickets	–
Bowling average	–
5 wickets in innings	–
10 wickets in match	–
Best bowling	–
Catches/stumpings	–/–
- Source: Cricinfo, 28 October 2010

Richard James Mansfield (born 21 January 1975) is a former Indian born English cricketer. Mansfield was a right-handed batsman who bowled right-arm off break. He was born in Madras, Tamil Nadu.

Mansfield represented the Surrey Cricket Board in 3 List A matches, the first of which came against Lincolnshire in the 2nd round of the 2002 Cheltenham & Gloucester Trophy which was played in 2001. His final 2 List A matches came against the Gloucestershire Cricket Board and the Essex Cricket Board in the 1st and 2nd rounds of the 2003 Cheltenham & Gloucester Trophy which were held in 2002. In his 3 List A matches, he scored 46 runs at a batting average of 15.33, with a high score of 40.
