= Southgate Cricket Club =

Cricket club in Southgate, London, England

Southgate Cricket Club is in Southgate, part of the London Borough of Enfield, England. The club plays at the Walker Cricket Ground, and in the Middlesex County Cricket League. Middlesex County Cricket Club occasionally plays County Championship, one-day, and 20/20 matches at the Southgate ground.

The club was founded in 1855 by the brothers, "Walkers of Southgate". Its ground, Chapel Fields in Waterfall Road, Southgate, was renamed the Walker Cricket Ground in their honour in 1907 and is maintained by the Walker Trust.

The club played eight matches ranked as first-class between 1863 and 1868. Six of these were against Oxford University and the remaining two were against Cambridge University. Although recognised as first-class fixtures, they were all scheduled for only two days; all were away fixtures.

Four of the Walker brothers played for the United All-England Eleven. Both the United All-England team and the Marylebone Cricket Club (MCC) would visit Southgate to compete with the brothers and their team, attracting crowds of up to 10,000.

Southgate CC won the national club cricket competition in 1977 (then called the John Haig Trophy) and the Middlesex County Cricket League in 1976 and 1977. The club remained in the Premier League at the start of the 2017 season.

In 2011 the 1st XI gained promotion to the Middlesex County Cricket League Premier Division, winning the Division Two championship.
