= Andrew Hollingsworth =

English cricketer (born 1979)

Personal information
- Full name: Andrew Philip Hollingsworth
- Born: 11 October 1979 (age 47); Chertsey, Surrey, England
- Batting: Right-handed
- Bowling: Right-arm medium

Domestic team information
- Years: Team
- 2002: Durham UCCE
- 2001–2002: Surrey Cricket Board

Career statistics
Competition	FC	LA
Matches	3	2
Runs scored	72	56
Batting average	24.00	28.00
100s/50s	–/–	–/–
Top score	42*	29
Balls bowled	138	120
Wickets	4	3
Bowling average	21.50	27.66
5 wickets in innings	–	–
10 wickets in match	–	–
Best bowling	3/35	3/36
Catches/stumpings	1/–	2/–
- Source: Cricinfo, 28 October 2010

Andrew Philip Hollingsworth (born 11 October 1979) is an English cricketer. Hollingsworth is a right-handed batsman who bowls right-arm medium pace. He was born at Chertsey, Surrey.

Hollingsworth represented the Surrey Cricket Board in 2 List A matches against Lincolnshire in the 1st round of the 2002 Cheltenham & Gloucester Trophy which was played in 2001 and the Essex Cricket Board in the 2nd round of the 2003 Cheltenham & Gloucester Trophy which was held in 2002. In his 2 matches for the Board, he scored 56 runs at a batting average of 28.00, with a high score of 29. In the field he took 3 catches. With the ball he took 3 wickets at an average of 27.66, with best figures of 3/36.

Hollingsworth made his first-class debut for Durham UCCE against Durham in 2002. During 2002 he represented the university in 2 further first-class matches against Nottinghamshire and Lancashire. In his 3 first-class matches, he scored 72 runs at an average of 24.00, with a high score of 42*. In the field he took a single catch. With the ball he took 4 wickets at an average of 21.50, with best figures of 3/35.
