= Mark Bainbridge =

English cricketer

Personal information
- Full name: Mark The Shark Bainbridge
- Born: 11 May 1973 (age 53); Isleworth, London, England
- Batting: Right-handed
- Bowling: Slow left-arm orthodox

Domestic team information
- Years: Team
- 1999–2001: Surrey Cricket Board

Career statistics
Competition	LA
Matches	5
Runs scored	151
Batting average	30.20
100s/50s	–/–
Top score	38
Balls bowled	–
Wickets	–
Bowling average	–
5 wickets in innings	–
10 wickets in match	–
Best bowling	–
Catches/stumpings	2/–
- Source: Cricinfo, 30 October 2010

Mark Robert Bainbridge (born 11 May 1973) is a former English cricketer. Bainbridge was a right-handed batsman who bowled slow left-arm orthodox. He was born in Isleworth, London.

Bainbridge represented the Surrey Cricket Board in List A cricket. His debut List A match came against Norfolk in the 1999 NatWest Trophy. From 1999 to 2001, he represented the Board in 4 List A matches, the last of which came against Surrey in the 2001 Cheltenham & Gloucester Trophy. In his 5 List A matches, he scored 151 runs at a batting average of 30.20, with a high score of 38. In the field he took 2 catches.
