= Ben Jeffery (cricketer) =

English cricketer

Personal information
- Full name: Benjamin Anthony Jeffery
- Born: 31 July 1991 (age 35); Camden, London, England
- Height: 6 ft 5 in (1.96 m)
- Batting: Right-handed
- Bowling: Leg break

Domestic team information
- Years: Team
- 2011–2013: Oxford University
- 2012–2014: Oxford MCCU

Career statistics
Competition	First-class
Matches	6
Runs scored	133
Batting average	13.30
100s/50s	–/–
Top score	39
Catches/stumpings	6/–
- Source: Cricinfo, 6 May 2020

Benjamin Anthony Jeffery (born 31 July 1991) is an English former first-class cricketer.

== Early life and career ==
Jeffery was born at Camden in July 1991. He was educated at Charterhouse, before going up to St John's College, Oxford. He played first-class cricket while studying at Oxford, making his first-class debut for Oxford University against Cambridge University in The University Match of 2011, with Jeffery also featuring in The University Matches of 2012 and 2013. While at Oxford, he also made three first-class appearances for Oxford MCCU, with two matches in 2012 and one in 2014. (Note: Oxford MCCU differed from Oxford University Cricket Club in that it was open to students at Oxford Brookes University, whereas Oxford University Cricket Club is exclusively for students of the constituent colleges of the University of Oxford.) In six first-class matches, Jeffery scored 133 runs at an average of 13.30 and a high score of 39.

After graduating from Oxford, Jeffery moved into consultancy, in which he is currently employed by Boston Consulting Group. He also turns out regularly for Grayswood Cricket Club in the I'anson Cricket League.
