= Joe Cracknell (cricketer) =

English cricketer (born 2000)

Personal information
- Full name: Joseph Benjamin Cracknell
- Born: 16 March 2000 (age 26); Enfield, London, England
- Batting: Right-handed
- Role: Wicket-keeper

Domestic team information
- Years: Team
- 2019–present: Middlesex (squad no. 48)
- First-class debut: 11 July 2021 Middlesex v Leicestershire
- List A debut: 25 July 2021 Middlesex v Essex

Career statistics
Competition	FC	LA	T20
Matches	20	41	68
Runs scored	932	1,227	1,297
Batting average	38.83	33.16	21.26
100s/50s	1/5	1/8	0/5
Top score	112	128	77
Catches/stumpings	60/1	45/6	36/4
- Source: Cricinfo, 27 September 2026

Joseph Benjamin Cracknell (born 16 March 2000) is an English cricketer. He made his Twenty20 debut on 21 June 2019, for Middlesex against Leinster Lightning. He made his first-class debut on 11 July 2021, for Middlesex in the 2021 County Championship. He made his List A debut on 25 July 2021, for Middlesex in the 2021 Royal London One-Day Cup.

Cracknell grew up playing at North Middlesex Cricket Club. He later represented Durham University while completing a degree in Sports Science.
