= Matthew Friedlander =

South African cricketer (born 1979)

Personal information
- Full name: Matthew James Friedlander
- Born: 1 August 1979 (age 47); Durban, Natal, South Africa
- Batting: Right-handed
- Bowling: Right-arm fast-medium

Domestic team information
- Years: Team
- 2005–08: CUCCE
- 2005: Northamptonshire
- 2003/4: Boland

Career statistics
Competition	FC	LA
Matches	14	3
Runs scored	260	–
Batting average	14.44	–
100s/50s	–/1	–/–
Top score	81	–
Balls bowled	1,410	84
Wickets	26	2
Bowling average	41.15	35.50
5 wickets in innings	1	–
10 wickets in match	–	–
Best bowling	6/78	2/27
Catches/stumpings	5/–	–/–
- Source: Cricinfo, 29 September 2010

Matthew James Friedlander (born 1 August 1979) is a former South African cricketer. Friedlander is a right-handed batsman who bowls right-arm fast-medium. He was born in Durban, Natal.

Friedlander made his first-class debut for Boland during the 2003/4 season against Free State. His second and final first-class match for Boland came during the same season against Easterns. He also made his debut in List-A cricket during this season against North West. He played 2 further List-A matches during the season against Border and Free State. In his 3 List-A matches he took 2 wickets at a bowling average of 2/27.

In 2005, he made his first-class debut for CUCCE in 2005 against Essex in England. From 2005 to 2008, he represented the university in 10 first-class matches, the last of which came against Warwickshire. In 2005 he also represented a combined British Universities team against the touring Bangladeshis. During the 2005 season he represented Northamptonshire in a single first-class match against the Bangladeshis. In his combined first-class career, he scored 260 runs at a batting average of 14.44, with a single half century high score of 81. With the ball he took 26 wickets at an average of 41.15, with a single five wicket haul of 6/78, which represented his best figures.

In local domestic cricket, he currently plays for Cambridge Granta Cricket Club in the East Anglian Premier Cricket League.
