= Luke Hollman =

English cricketer (born 2000)

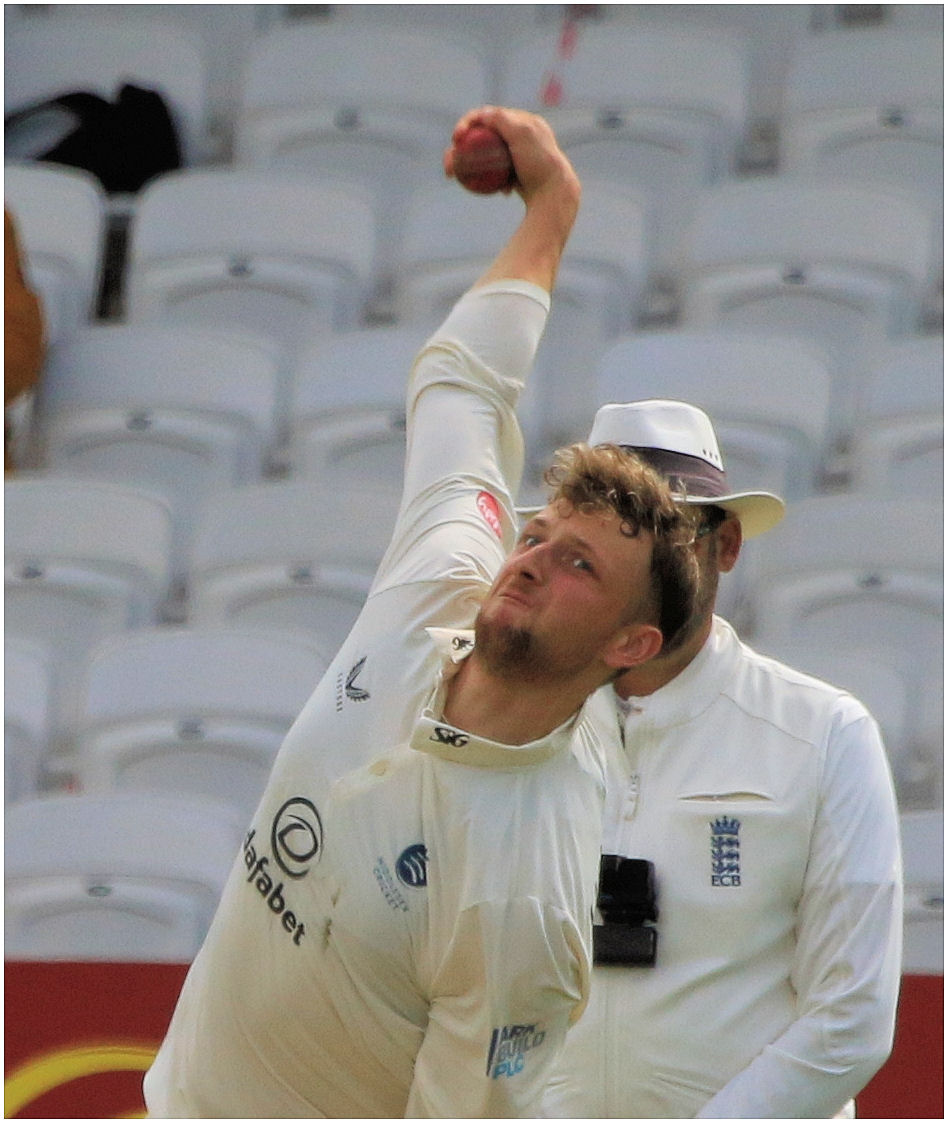
- Hollman in 2024

Personal information
- Full name: Luke Barnaby Kurt Hollman
- Born: 16 September 2000 (age 26); Islington, London, England
- Batting: Left-handed
- Bowling: Right arm leg break
- Role: All-rounder

Domestic team information
- Years: Team
- 2020–present: Middlesex (squad no. 56)
- FC debut: 22 April 2021 Middlesex v Surrey
- LA debut: 25 July 2021 Middlesex v Essex

Career statistics
Competition	FC	LA	T20
Matches	48	41	85
Runs scored	1,814	802	1,118
Batting average	26.28	27.65	20.32
100s/50s	1/9	0/2	0/1
Top score	103	83*	51
Balls bowled	4,434	2,004	1,484
Wickets	66	62	88
Bowling average	43.60	29.22	23.90
5 wickets in innings	2	0	1
10 wickets in match	1	0	0
Best bowling	5/65	4/27	5/16
Catches/stumpings	21/–	21/–	38/–
- Source: Cricinfo, 27 September 2026

Luke Barnaby Kurt Hollman (born 16 September 2000) is an English cricketer.

== Early life ==
Hollman was born in Islington, and grew up playing for North Middlesex Cricket Club.

== Career ==
Having signed his first professional contract in November 2019, Hollman made his Twenty20 debut on 1 September 2020, for Middlesex in the 2020 t20 Blast. Prior to his T20 debut, he was a member of the England squad for the 2018 Under-19 Cricket World Cup. He made his first-class debut on 22 April 2021, for Middlesex against Surrey in the 2021 County Championship. He made his List A debut on 25 July 2021, for Middlesex in the 2021 Royal London One-Day Cup. In September 2021, in the 2021 County Championship, Hollman took his maiden five-wicket haul in first-class cricket.

In May 2025, Hollman registered his maiden first-class century, scoring 103 runs against Kent in the 2025 County Championship. Having played 150 matches for Middlesex across all formats, he agreed a new three-year contract in November 2025, tying him into the club until at least the end of the 2028 season.
