= Middlesex County Cricket League =

Club cricket league in England

- Countries: United Kingdom
- Administrator: ECB
- Format: Limited Overs
- First edition: 1972
- Tournament format: League
- Number of teams: 43 (Clubs)
- Current champion: Crouch End CC
- Most successful: Ealing CC (12)
- Website: https://www.middlesexccl.com

The Middlesex County Cricket League (MCCL) is the only adult Saturday league for recreational club cricket in the historic county of Middlesex, England. In practical terms, this means it encompasses teams from North and West London. The league was founded in 1972, and since 1999 the top division of the Middlesex County Cricket League has been a designated ECB Premier League.

Four MCCL clubs have won the ECB National Club Cricket Championship: Enfield (1988), Hampstead (1969), Southgate (1977), and Teddington (1989 and 1991). Ealing have won the ECB National Club Twenty20 twice (2011 and 2015).

== History ==
The MCCL was officially founded in 1972, after holding a 'dry run' in 1971 to ensure that the league's launch went smoothly. It was founded with 16 clubs as members (Brentham, Brondesbury, Ealing, Edmonton, Enfield, Finchley, Hornsey, North Middlesex, Richmond, Shepherds Bush, South Hampstead, Southgate, Stanmore, Teddington, Wembley, and Winchmore Hill), and in the first season Hornsey won the league title with ten wins from their fifteen fixtures. Nine of the ten clubs who are expected to play in the Premier Division in 2024 were among these founder members.

The format of matches was the same for the formation of the league until 2014, with all matches played on a "timed" basis, with draws possible. From 2015 onwards, the format was changed in the Premier Division such that half the matches were timed, and half played in a limited overs format; in 2016, other divisions followed, with all adopting split formats.

The dominant team in the league has evolved over time, with Finchley dominant in the 1970s and 1990s, while Ealing won an unprecedented seven consecutive titles from 2005 to 2011.

== League Structure ==
The league is played (other than in the lowest divisions) between divisions of ten clubs, each playing the other members of their division twice for an 18 week season, commencing in early May and ending in early September. Divisions are segregated so that a first XI from one club will only play first XIs of other clubs; the same is the case for second XIs, while third, fourth and fifth XIs play in a merged competition. The MCCL has undergone two major mergers in recent years, merging with the 1987 League in 2019, and then subsequently absorbing the Middlesex Championship ahead of the 2021 season. Following those mergers the League consists of six full divisions and a shorthanded seventh division for first XIs; five full divisions and a reduced size fifth division for second XIs; and nine divisions for third, fourth and fifth XIs.

== Winners ==
=== Middlesex County Cricket League since 1972 ===
- League Champions 1972–1991
  Year	Club
  1972	Hornsey
  1973	Finchley
  1974	South Hampstead
  1975	Finchley
  1976	Southgate
  1977	Southgate
  1978	Finchley
  1979	Finchley
  1980	Finchley
  1981	Hornsey
  1982	Enfield
  1983	Stanmore
  1984	Teddington
  1985	Teddington
  1986	Enfield
  1987	Finchley
  1988	South Hampstead
  1989	Richmond
  1990	North Middlesex
  1991	Ealing
- League Champions 1992–2011
  Year	Club
  1992	Finchley
  1993	Finchley
  1994	Finchley
  1995	Teddington
  1996	Teddington
  1997	Ealing
  1998	Richmond
  1999	Brondesbury
  2000	Brondesbury
  2001	Ealing
  2002	Teddington
  2003	Brondesbury
  2004	Richmond
  2005	Ealing
  2006	Ealing
  2007	Ealing
  2008	Ealing
  2009	Ealing
  2010	Ealing
  2011	Ealing
- League Champions 2012–2026
  Year	Club
  2012	Winchmore Hill
  2013	Hampstead
  2014	Teddington
  2015	Hampstead
  2016	Teddington
  2017	Ealing
  2018	Richmond
  2019	North Middlesex
  2020	Teddington (Note: Due to the Coronavirus pandemic an ad-hoc league competition took place during the late summer of 2020. No team was relegated, although the winners were regarded as official league champions.)
  2021	Crouch End
  2022	Teddington
  2023	Stanmore
  2024	Ealing
  2025	North Middlesex
  2026	Crouch End

== Performance by season from 1999 ==
Key
Gold	Champions
Blue	Left League
Red	Relegated

Performance by season, from 1999
Club	1999	2000	2001	2002	2003	2004	2005	2006	2007	2008	2009	2010	2011	2012	2013	2014	2015	2016	2017	2018	2019	2020	2021	2022	2023	2024	2025	2026
Acton												10																
Barnes					8	10																						
Brentham	7	6	9					9		10																		
Brondesbury	1	1	2	3	1	2	2	7	5	6	7	4	7	9		10			8	9		8	9		2	10		
Crouch End																						7	1	3	4	3	5	1
Ealing			1	4	3	3	1	1	1	1	1	1	1	3	2	3	4	5	1	2	3	4	7	7	6	1	8	9
Eastcote	8	5	6	7	9		9		8	7	5	3	4	4	10			10										
Finchley	3	2	7	6	5	5	8	2	2	4	3	8	5	7	7	8	9		7	8	7	9	10		8	9		5
Hampstead				9		7	5	3	3	3	4	5	8	6	1	6	1	6	5	6	2	5	8	6	9		10	
Harrow St Mary's																					10						9	
Highgate																				10								
Hornsey		9												5	8	9								10		7	7	2
Ickenham							10																					
Indian Gymkhana																	10											
North Middlesex																5	5	2	3	3	1	6	2	5	5	4	1	8
Richmond	10		8	2	6	1	6	8	9		10		9		5	7	2	3	4	1	6	2	6	9		6	6	4
Shepherds Bush											8	9						7	6	5	4	3	4	2	3	2	2	6
Southgate	9				7	9				9				10			7	4	9									
Stanmore	4	10		8	2	6	3	4	7	8	6	6	6	8	3	4	3	8	10		9			4	1	8	4	7
Teddington	6	3	4	1	4	8	4	6	4	2	2	2	2	2	6	1	8	1	2	4	5	1	3	1	7	5	3	3
Twickenham												7	10		4	2	6	9		7	8	10	5	8	10			10
Uxbridge	5	7	10					10																				
Wembley		8	5	5	10				10																			
Winchmore Hill	2	4	3	10		4	7	5	6	5	9		3	1	9													
References																						(Note: Due to the Coronavirus pandemic an ad-hoc league competition took place during the late summer of 2020. No team was relegated, although the winners were regarded as official league champions.)						
