= Peter James (cricketer) =

English cricketer

Personal information
- Full name: Peter Martin James
- Born: 4 October 1971 (age 55); Kensington, London, England
- Batting: Right-handed
- Role: Wicketkeeper

Domestic team information
- Years: Team
- 1999–2000: Surrey Cricket Board

Career statistics
Competition	LA
Matches	3
Runs scored	32
Batting average	32.00
100s/50s	–/–
Top score	23*
Balls bowled	–
Wickets	–
Bowling average	–
5 wickets in innings	–
10 wickets in match	–
Best bowling	–
Catches/stumpings	2/–
- Source: Cricinfo, 30 October 2010

Peter Martin James (born 4 October 1971) is a former English cricketer. James was a right-handed batsman who played primarily as a wicketkeeper. He was born in Kensington, London.

James represented the Surrey Cricket Board in 3 List A matches against Norfolk and Cheshire in the 1999 NatWest Trophy, and Shropshire in the 2000 NatWest Trophy. In his 3 List A matches, he scored 32 runs at a batting average of 32.00, with a high score of 23*. Behind the stumps he took 2 catches.
