= Gary Martin (English cricketer) =

English cricketer

Personal information
- Full name: Gary Robert E Martin
- Born: 27 February 1968 (age 58); Chessington, Surrey, England
- Batting: Right-handed

Domestic team information
- Years: Team
- 2002: Surrey Cricket Board

Career statistics
Competition	LA
Matches	2
Runs scored	20
Batting average	10.00
100s/50s	–/–
Top score	13
Balls bowled	–
Wickets	–
Bowling average	–
5 wickets in innings	–
10 wickets in match	–
Best bowling	–
Catches/stumpings	–/–
- Source: Cricinfo, 28 October 2010

Gary Robert E Martin (born 27 February 1968) is a former English cricketer. Martin was a right-handed batsman. He was born at Chessington, Surrey.

Martin represented the Surrey Cricket Board in 2 List A matches against the Gloucestershire Cricket Board and the Essex Cricket Board in the 1st and 2nd rounds of the 2003 Cheltenham & Gloucester Trophy which was played in 2002. In his 2 List A matches, he scored 20 runs at a batting average of 10.00, with a high score of 13.
