= Wimbledon Cricket Club =

Wimbledon Cricket Club is a cricket club who play in the Surrey Championship Premier League. The club was formed in 1854 and play their home games at Wimbledon Cricket Club Ground. They have won the Surrey Championship on 12 occasions and the ECB National Club Twenty20 three times.
