= ECB National Club Twenty20 =

Knockout cricket competition in England

The ECB National Club Twenty20 is a knockout Twenty20 club cricket competition in England. It was established in 2008 and the inaugural winners were South Northumberland. The competition is currently known for sponsorship reasons as the Vitality Club T20. In 2023 Wimbledon, won the title for the third time when they beat Sandiacre Town. The 2025 champions are New Farnley.

== Format ==
The tournament, along with the national club competition, is aligned with the ECB Premier Leagues and to enter the tournament you must be a part of an ECB Premier League or invited to take part by one.

The early rounds of the tournament are held within each of the 33 ECB Premier Leagues, with each league putting forward a winner to go to the national competition.

All rounds are played in 3 or 4 team one-day competitions, where either 3 teams play in a round-robin to determine a winner or 4 teams play a knockout. Once the 32 Premier League winners are determines the competition hosts 8 regional finals, these are; South East Area, South West Area, South Area, East Midlands Area, West Midlands Area, North West Area, North Area and North East Area. The 8 winners of these knockouts go to a semi final played at 2 venues, where the 2 winners of this knock out play in a final, traditionally in September. In previous years the finals day has been a 4 team knockout but it has since been changed to a straight final.

== Winners ==
Cockspur Club Twenty20

- 2008: South Northumberland
- 2009: Bournemouth
- 2010: Swardeston

Natwest Club Twenty20

- 2011: Ealing
- 2012: Wimbledon
- 2013: Wimbledon
- 2014: Chester Boughton Hall
- 2015: Ealing
- 2016: Swardeston
- 2017: South Northumberland

Vitality Club T20

- 2018: Hanging Heaton
- 2019: Swardeston
- 2021: Tunbridge Wells
- 2022: Hornchurch
- 2023: Wimbledon
- 2024: Northern
- 2025: New Farnley
