= Ealing Cricket Club =

Ealing Cricket Club is a cricket club in Ealing, London (formerly Middlesex).

The club was formed in 1870, and have played their home games at Ealing Cricket Club Ground since at least 1874.

The 1st XI play in the Middlesex County Cricket League Premier League, which they have won 12 times, most recently in 2024. They have won the ECB National Club Twenty20 in 2011 and 2015. They have also been runners-up in the ECB National Club Cricket Championship on 4 occasions.

The club currently fields 7 senior men's teams, 17 junior teams and a women's team which competes in the Middlesex Women's Cricket League.They are one of the biggest clubs in Middlesex with over 600 colts.
