= Surrey Championship =

English cricket league

- Countries: England
- Format: Limited Overs
- First edition: 1968 (founded); 2000 (ECB Premier League)
- Tournament format: League
- Number of teams: 10 (ECB Premier Division)
- Current champion: East Molesey CC
- Most successful: Wimbledon CC (13)
- Website: https://surreychampionship.play-cricket.com/

The Surrey Championship is a cricket organisation in Surrey running 6 divisions for 1st & 2nd XI cricket, 4 for 3rd XI and 4 for 4th XI. Since 2000 it has been a designated ECB Premier League.

== History ==
The competition was founded in 1968 by 17 clubs within Surrey, the idea to create a more competitive form of club cricket, rather than the friendly leagues that had previously been the formats for many clubs. The 17 founder member clubs were: Addiscombe, Banstead, Beddington, Cheam, Dulwich, East Molesey, Epsom, Guildford, Malden Wanderers, Mitcham, Old Emanuel, Old Whitgiftians, Purley, Spencer, Streatham, Sunbury and Sutton. Up until 1977, there were only 1st XI and 2nd XI sections within the organisation. The Eve Group became the first sponsors of the competition in 1982, and kept that role for 19 seasons, until Castle Lager became sponsors in 2001, Travelbag, were the sponsors up until 2016. The current sponsors are AJ Fordham Sports.

== 1st XI Champions ==
1st XI Champions, 1968-1987
Year	Club
1968	Sutton
1969	Epsom
1970	Mitcham
1971	Mitcham
1972	Guildford
1973	Mitcham
1974	Dulwich
1975	Dulwich
1976	Dulwich
1977	Malden Wanderers
1978	Mitcham
1979	Epsom
1980	East Molesey
1981	Wimbledon
1982	Epsom
1983	Esher
1984	Wimbledon
1985	Wimbledon
1986	Banstead
1987	Guildford

1st XI Champions, 1988-2007
Year	Club
1988	Sunbury
1989	Malden Wanderers
1990	Cheam
1991	Sutton
1992	Wimbledon
1993	Esher
1994	Spencer
1995	Wimbledon
1996	Esher
1997	Wimbledon
1998	Sunbury
1999	Weybridge
2000	Wimbledon
2001	Guildford
2002	Wimbledon
2003	Weybridge
2004	Weybridge
2005	Reigate Priory
2006	Sutton
2007	Reigate Priory

1st XI Champions, 2008-present
Year	Club
2008	Reigate Priory
2009	Sutton
2010	Reigate Priory
2011	Wimbledon
2012	Wimbledon
2013	Wimbledon
2014	Reigate Priory
2015	Sunbury
2016	Sunbury
2017	Normandy
2018	Weybridge
2019	East Molesey
2020	no competition
2021	East Molesey
2022	Wimbledon
2023	Sunbury
2024	East Molesey
2025	Wimbledon
2026	East Molesey

=== Championships won ===
ECB Premier Division Champions
Wins	Club
13	Wimbledon
5	East Molesey
5	Reigate Priory
5	Sunbury
4	Esher
4	Mitcham
4	Weybridge
3	Dulwich
3	Epsom
3	Guildford
2	Malden Wanderers
1	Banstead
1	Cheam
1	Normandy

== Performance by season from 2000 ==
Key
Gold	Champions
Red	Relegated

Performance by season, from 2000
Club	2000	2001	2002	2003	2004	2005	2006	2007	2008	2009	2010	2011	2012	2013	2014	2015	2016	2017	2018	2019	2021	2022	2023	2024	2025	2026
Ashtead											5	9					6	7	3	6	8	7	8	4	5	5
Bank of England			10																							
Banstead	3	2	5	7	8	10				8	4	5	4	6	10				5	3	9			6	3	9
Beddington																8	10									
Camberley													10													
Cheam	9		6	9								10														
Cobham Avorians (Note: Cobham Avorians were simply called Avorians until 2005.)					9			6	5	4	9															
Cranleigh																		6	10		10		9			
Dulwich						8	7	8	9																10	
East Molesey														9			8	8	8	1	1	3	3	1	4	1
Esher	7	4	8	5	6	3	9													8	4	4	6	5	8	2
Farnham		10				4	5	9																		
Guildford	5	1	2	4	10		3	7	7	6	7	6	5	7	8	7	7	9		10			2	9		10
Leatherhead															6	10										
Malden Wanderers		9		8	7	7	10		2	7	10		6	10								9				
Normandy				6	5	2	8	2	10			4	9			2	5	1	9		7	6	10			6
Reigate Priory	8	5	4	2	4	1	2	1	1	2	1	3	3	4	1	4	2	3	2	2	6	2	5	2	2	7
Spencer	10				3	9			3	10				5	9										7	8
Sunbury	2	6	9					5	6	3	3	2	2	3	4	1	1	2	6	7	2	8	1	7	9	
Sutton	4	7	7	10			1	4	8	1	8	7	7	8	3	5	9		7	9		10		8	6	3
Valley End															7	9		10								
Weybridge	6	3	3	1	1	6	6	10		9	6	8	8	2	5	3	3	5	1	5	3	5	7	10		
Wimbledon	1	8	1	3	2	5	4	3	4	5	2	1	1	1	2	6	4	4	4	4	5	1	4	3	1	4
References																										
