= List of Lancashire Cricket Board List A players =

Lancashire Cricket Board played in List A cricket matches between 1999 and 2002. This is a list of the players who appeared in those matches.

- James Anderson (2000): JM Anderson
- John Armstrong (2002): JM Armstrong
- Neil Bannister (2000): NDR Bannister
- Christopher Barrow (2001): CM Barrow
- Stuart Catterall (2000–2002): SC Catterall
- Steven Croft (2002): SJ Croft
- Gareth Cross (2002): GD Cross
- Stephen Dearden (1999–2002): SE Dearden
- Russell Edmonds (2000): RS Edmonds
- Damian Eyre (1999–2001): DR Eyre
- Darron Foy (1999–2000): DT Foy
- Paul Green (1999–2002): P Green
- Jonathon Harvey (1999–2001): JD Harvey
- David Heyes (1999–2000): DJ Heyes
- Roland Horridge (1999–2001): REWG Horridge
- Paul Horton (2002): PJ Horton
- Irfan Rana (2001): Irfan Rana
- Graham Knowles (2000–2002): GA Knowles
- Mark Lomas (1999–2001): MC Lomas
- Sajid Mahmood (2001): SI Mahmood
- Andrew Mercer (2002): AJ Mercer
- Oliver Newby (2002): OJ Newby
- Steven Oddy (2001): SC Oddy
- Matthew Parkinson (1999): ME Parkinson
- Gavin Reynolds (2001): G Reynolds
- David Snellgrove (1999–2002): DR Snellgrove
- Matthew Taylor (2000): M Taylor
- Phil Unsworth (2001): PN Unsworth
- Duncan Whalley (2001): RD Whalley
- David White (1999): DG White
