= 1973 in the United Kingdom =

Events from the year 1973 in the United Kingdom.

== Incumbents ==
- Monarch – Elizabeth II
- Prime Minister – Edward Heath (Conservative)

== Events ==
=== January ===
- 1 January – The United Kingdom, Ireland and Denmark enter the European Economic Community.
- 4 January – 300 children attack British Army troops in Derry, Northern Ireland.
- 11 January – The Open University awards its first degrees.
- 18 January – Eleven Labour Party councillors in Clay Cross, Derbyshire, England, are ordered to pay £6,985 for not enforcing the Housing Finance Act.
- 19 January – The super tug Statesman is sent to protect British fishing vessels from Icelandic action in the Cod War.
- 22 January – British share values fall by £4,000,000,000 in one day.
- 25 January – English actor Derren Nesbitt is convicted of assaulting his wife Anne Aubrey.

=== February ===
- 16 February – The Court of Appeal of England and Wales rules that The Sunday Times can publish articles on thalidomide and Distillers Company, despite ongoing legal actions by parents (the decision is overturned in July by the House of Lords).
- 20 February – Two Pakistanis are shot dead by police in London after being found in the Indian High Commission carrying pistols, which are later established to have been fake.
- 26 February – Edward Heath's government publishes a Green Paper on prices and incomes policy.
- 27 February – Rail workers and civil servants go on strike.

=== March ===
- 1 March
  - Dick Taverne, having resigned from the Parliament of the United Kingdom on leaving the Labour Party, is re-elected as a 'Democratic Labour' candidate.
  - Pink Floyd's The Dark Side of the Moon, one of rock's landmark and bestselling albums, is released in the UK. Sleeve design is by Hipgnosis.
- 3 March
  - Two IRA bombs explode in London, killing one person and injuring 250 others. Ten people are arrested hours later at Heathrow Airport on suspicion of being involved in the bombings.
  - Tottenham Hotspur win the Football League Cup final at Wembley, beating Norwich City 1–0.
- 8 March
  - Northern Ireland sovereignty referendum (the "Border Poll"): 98.9% of those voting in the province want Northern Ireland to remain within the UK. Turnout is 58.7%, although less than 1% for Catholics. This is the first referendum on regional government in the UK.
  - IRA bombs explode in Whitehall and the Old Bailey in London.
- 10 March – The governor of Bermuda, Sir Richard Sharples, and his aide-de-camp are assassinated by local activists.
- 17 March – Elizabeth II opens the replacement London Bridge.
- 21 March – Seven men are killed in the Lofthouse Colliery disaster in Yorkshire.
- 26 March – Women are admitted to the London Stock Exchange for the first time.

=== April ===
- 1 April
  - Value-added tax (VAT) comes into effect in the UK.
  - Phase 2 of the Price and Pay Code comes into effect, restricting rises in pay and prices as a counter-inflation measure.
- 6 April – Peter Niesewand, a correspondent of The Guardian newspaper and the BBC, is jailed in Rhodesia for an alleged breach of the Official Secrets Act.
- 10 April – Invicta International Airlines Flight 435, a charter by a group of women from the Axbridge district of Somerset flying from Bristol to Basel, crashes into a hillside near Hochwald, Switzerland, killing 108 of the 145 on board and injuring all but one of the 37 survivors, leaving 55 children motherless.
- 11 April – The House of Commons votes against restoring capital punishment by a margin of 142 votes.
- 12 April – The Labour Party wins control of the Greater London Council.
- 17 April – British Leyland launches its new Austin Allegro, a range of 2 and 4-door family saloons which will eventually replace the long-running 1100 and 1300 models, which are set to continue in production alongside the Allegro until 1974.
- 28 April – Liverpool and Celtic F.C. are crowned league champions of football in England and Scotland respectively.

=== May ===
- 1 May – 1.6 million workers go on strike over government pay restraints.
- 5 May–28 July – BBC Television series The Ascent of Man, written and presented by Jacob Bronowski, airs – there is also an accompanying best-selling book.
- 5 May – Sunderland A.F.C. achieve a shock 1–0 win over Leeds United in the FA Cup final at Wembley. Ian Porterfield scores the only goal of the game. It is the first time that an FA Cup winning team has not contained a single player to be capped at full international level, and the first postwar FA Cup won by a side outside the First Division.
- 10 May – The Liberal Party gains control of Liverpool council in the local council elections.
- 14 May – The British House of Commons votes to abolish capital punishment in Northern Ireland.
- 15 May – In the House of Commons, Prime Minister Edward Heath describes large payments made by Lonrho to Duncan Sandys through the tax haven of the Cayman Islands at a time when the government is trying to implement a counter-inflation policy as the "unacceptable face of capitalism".
- 20 May – The Royal Navy sends three frigates to protect British fishing vessels from Icelandic action in the Cod War dispute.
- 22 May – Lord Lambton resigns as an MP and Parliamentary Under-Secretary of State for Defence (RAF) over a 'call girl' scandal.
- 23 May – The Matrimonial Causes Act amends the law of divorce in England and Wales.
- 24 May – Earl Jellicoe, Lord Privy Seal and Leader of the House of Lords, resigns over a separate prostitution scandal.
- 29 May – Anne, Princess Royal, announces her engagement to equestrian Captain Mark Phillips.

=== June ===
- 6 June – St Mary's Church, Putney in London is gutted by fire, later revealed to be arson.
- 23 June – A fire at a house in Hull which kills a six-year-old boy is initially thought to be an accident but later emerges as the first of 26 fire deaths caused over the next seven years by arsonist Peter Dinsdale.

=== July ===
- 1 July – The British Library is established by merger of the British Museum Library in London and the National Lending Library for Science and Technology at Boston Spa in Yorkshire.
- 5 July
  - The Guardianship Act makes the rights of a mother equal with those of a father in respect of the care, custody and guardianship of minors in England and Wales.
  - The Isle of Man Post begins to issue its own postage stamps.
- 6 July – The eighth James Bond film – Live and Let Die – is released in British cinemas, with the spy being played for the first time by 45-year-old The Saint star Roger Moore.
- 10 July – The Bahamas gain full independence from the United Kingdom within the Commonwealth of Nations.
- 26 July – Parliamentary by-elections in the Isle of Ely and Ripon constituencies result in both seats being gained from the Conservatives by the Liberal Party candidates, media personality Clement Freud and David Austick respectively.
- 30 July
  - Markham Colliery disaster: Eighteen coal miners are killed at the coal mine near Staveley, Derbyshire, when the brake mechanism on their cage fails.
  - £20,000,000 compensation is paid to victims of Thalidomide following an eleven-year court case.
- 31 July – Militant protesters of Ian Paisley disrupt the first sitting of the Northern Ireland Assembly.

=== August ===
- 20 August – Football League president Len Shipman calls for the government to bring back the birch as a tactic of dealing with the growing problem of football hooliganism.
- 21 August – The coroner in the Bloody Sunday inquest accuses the British army of "sheer unadulterated murder" after the jury returns an open verdict.

=== September ===
- 3 September – The Trades Union Congress expels 20 members for registering under the Industrial Relations Act 1971.
- 8 September – The IRA detonates bombs in Manchester and at London Victoria station.
- 11 September ...
  - IRA bombs at King's Cross and Euston railway stations in London injure 13 people.
  - The fashion store Biba reopens in Kensington High Street.
- 12 September – Further IRA bombs explode in London's Oxford Street and Sloane Square.
- 28 September – The Somerset Coalfield is last worked (at Lower Writhlington near Radstock).

=== October ===
- 8 October
  - London Broadcasting Company, the United Kingdom's first legal commercial terrestrial Independent Local Radio station, begins broadcasting.
  - Prime Minister Edward Heath announces government proposals for its counter-inflationary Price and Pay Code Stage Three (continuing to July 1974), including limiting pay rises to 7%, restricting price rises, and paying a £10 Christmas bonus to pensioners – a move which would cost around £80,000,000 funded by a 9p rise in National Insurance contributions.
- 16 October
  - The film Don't Look Now, containing one of the most graphic sex scenes hitherto shown in mainstream British cinema, is released in a double bill with The Wicker Man.
  - Capital Radio, the United Kingdom's first legal music-themed commercial Independent Local Radio station, begins broadcasting in London.
- 20 October – The Dalai Lama makes his first visit to the UK.
- 26 October – Firefighters in Glasgow stage a one-day strike as part of a pay dispute; troops are drafted in to cover the fire stations.
- 31 October – The sixth series of BBC television sitcom Dad's Army opens with the episode "The Deadly Attachment" containing the "Don't tell him, Pike!" exchange which will become rated as one of the top three greatest comedy moments of British television.

=== November ===
- 8 November
  - The Second Cod War between the United Kingdom and Iceland ends.
  - The government makes £146,000,000 compensation available to three nationalised industries to cover losses resulting from the price restraint policies.
- 12 November
  - Miners begin an overtime ban; ambulance drivers begin selective strikes.
  - Television sitcom Last of the Summer Wine begins its first series run on BBC One, following a premiere in Comedy Playhouse on 4 January. It will run for 31 series spanning 37 years.
- 14 November
  - Eight members of the Provisional IRA are convicted of the March bombings in London.
  - Anne, Princess Royal, marries Captain Mark Phillips at Westminster Abbey.
- 26 November – Peter Walker, the Secretary for Trade and Industry, warns that petrol rationing may have to be introduced in the near future as a result of the oil crisis in the Middle East which is restricting petrol supply.
- November – Unemployment in the United Kingdom reaches a low of 3.4%; it goes no lower for at least 40 years.

=== December ===
- 5 December – The speed limit on all roads including motorways is reduced to 50 mph from 70 mph until further notice as a result of the oil crisis.
- 9 December – The Sunningdale Agreement is signed in Sunningdale, Berkshire by Prime Minister Edward Heath, Irish premier Liam Cosgrave, and representatives of the Ulster Unionist Party, the Social Democratic and Labour Party and the Alliance Party of Northern Ireland.
- 10 December
  - Brian Josephson shares the Nobel Prize in Physics "for his theoretical predictions of the properties of a supercurrent through a tunnel barrier, in particular those phenomena which are generally known as the Josephson effects".
  - Geoffrey Wilkinson wins the Nobel Prize in Chemistry jointly with Ernst Otto Fischer "for their pioneering work, performed independently, on the chemistry of the organometallic, so called sandwich compounds".
- 19 December – Ealing rail crash: The 17.18 Paddington to Oxford express train is derailed between Ealing Broadway and West Ealing due to a locomotive maintenance error resulting in 10 dead and 94 injured.
- 31 December – Coal shortages caused by industrial action result in the implementation of the Three-Day Week electricity consumption reduction measure.

=== Undated ===
- Inflation rises to 8.4%.
- Total fertility rate (average number of births per woman over her reproductive life) falls to 2.04, giving sub-replacement fertility for the UK. The sex ratio (excess of male children born over females) reaches 106.7, the highest this century for the UK.
- Start of Secondary banking crisis of 1973–1975.
- Darul Uloom Bury, the UK's oldest Islamic seminary, is established.
- The Vindolanda tablets are discovered by Robin Birley near Hadrian's Wall.
- Pizza Hut opens its first UK restaurant, in Islington.
- The National House Building Council is formed .
- Completion of Cromwell Tower, the first tower block on the Barbican Estate in the City of London and at this date London's tallest residential tower at 42 storeys and 123 metres (404 ft) high.
- Death of last pure-bred Norfolk Horn ram.

== Publications ==
- Martin Amis's novel The Rachel Papers.
- Agatha Christie's novel Postern of Fate.
- J. G. Farrell's novel The Siege of Krishnapur.
- Graham Greene's novel The Honorary Consul.
- B. S. Johnson's novel Christie Malry's Own Double-Entry.
- Iris Murdoch's novel The Black Prince.

== Births ==
=== January–March ===
- 1 January – Jimi Mistry, actor
- 18 January
  - Crispian Mills, musician (The Jeevas and Kula Shaker)
  - Ben Willbond, actor and screenwriter
- 29 January – Miranda Krestovnikoff, née Harper-Jones, archaeologist and television host
- 7 February – Kate Thornton, television presenter
- 8 February – Sonia Deol, presenter
- 10 February – Martha Lane Fox, businesswoman and life peer
- 13 February – Ian Duncan, Baron Duncan of Springbank, English politician
- 27 February – Peter Andre, singer
- 28 February – Jonathan Dakin, cricketer
- 2 March – Trevor Sinclair, football player and commentator
- 3 March – Matthew Marsden, actor and martial artist
- 4 March – Penny Mordaunt, politician
- 10 March – Chris Sutton, football player and commentator
- 28 March – Scott Mills, radio disc jockey
- 30 March – Elizabeth Arnold (swimmer), swimmer

=== April–June ===
- 1 April – Kris Marshall, actor
- 2 April – Simon Farnaby, actor, writer and comedian
- 3 April – Jamie Bamber, actor
- 7 April – Christian O'Connell, radio DJ and presenter
- 11 April – Amanda Staveley, business executive
- 21 April
  - Steve Backshall, naturalist, writer and television presenter
  - Mark Dexter, actor
- 24 April – Gabby Logan, sports presenter
- 26 April – Geoff Lloyd, radio host
- 26 April – Chris Perry, English footballer
- 8 May
  - Marcus Brigstocke, British comedian
  - Paul Warne, English football player and manager
- 10 May
  - Gareth Ainsworth, English footballer
- 14 May – Fraser Nelson, political journalist
- 17 May – Tamsier Joof Aviance, dancer, choreographer and entrepreneur (of Senegalese and Gambian descent)
- 19 May
  - Dario Franchitti, Scottish racing driver and commentator
  - Alice Roberts, English scientist and broadcaster
- 21 May – Noel Fielding, English comedian
- 24 May
  - Dermot O'Leary, British television presenter
  - Matthew Rudd, British radio presenter
- 28 May – Nathan Jones, Welsh football player and manager
- 30 May – Leigh Francis, British comedian
- 9 June – Iain Lee, British comedian and radio and television presenter
- 24 June – Charles Venn, English actor
- 25 June – Jamie Redknapp, English footballer
- 27 June
  - Razaaq Adoti, actor, producer and screenwriter
  - Tom Tugendhat, English politician

=== July–September ===
- 2 July – Peter Kay, comedian
- 3 July – Emma Cunniffe, actress
- 6 July – Bradley Dredge, golfer
- 8 July – Viv Groskop, journalist and comedian
- 10 July
  - Neil Bannister, English cricketer
  - Craig Heap, English gymnast
- 19 July – Wayne Rigby, British boxer
- 23 July – Fran Healy, singer (Travis)
- 25 July
  - Dani Filth, vocalist
  - Kevin Phillips, English footballer
- 26 July – Kate Beckinsale, actress
- 27 July – Tom Kerridge, chef
- 28 July (possible date) – Banksy, graffiti artist
- 3 August – Stephen Graham, actor
- 6 August – Iain Morris, screenwriter and producer
- 12 August – Richard Reid, terrorist
- 20 August – Stephen Nolan, Northern Irish radio presenter
- 24 August – Dave Brown, English comedian
- 5 September – Paddy Considine, actor
- 12 September – Darren Campbell, athlete
- 15 September – Julie Cox, English actress
- 20 September – Jason MacIntyre, Scottish racing cyclist (died 2008)
- 29 September – Alfie Boe, singer and actor

=== October–December ===
- 3 October
  - Richard Ian Cox, Welsh-Canadian voice actor and radio host
  - Grace Dent, English journalist and broadcaster
- 21 October – Bev Turner, British television and radio presenter
- 5 November – Danniella Westbrook, actress and television personality
- 10 November – Jacqui Abbott, English singer
- 18 November – Jonnie Irwin, English television presenter (died 2024)
- 24 November – Lucy Liemann, English actress
- 29 November – Ryan Giggs, Welsh footballer
- 1 December – Kieron Durkan, English-born Irish footballer (died 2018)
- 4 December – Michael Jackson, English football defender and manager
- 17 December – Paula Radcliffe, British athlete
- 18 December – Lucy Worsley, English historian
- 24 December
  - Paul Foot, English comedian
  - Matt Tebbutt, British television presenter and chef
- 25 December – Ewen MacIntosh, Welsh actor and comedian (died 2024)

=== Undated ===
- Katie Carr, actress and model
- Frances Hardinge, young adult fiction writer

== Deaths ==
=== January–March ===
- 15 January – Neil M. Gunn, Scottish novelist, critic, and dramatist (born 1891)
- 19 January – Max Adrian, Northern Irish actor (born 1903)
- 16 February – Harold Gibbons, English cricketer (born 1904)
- 22 February – Elizabeth Bowen, novelist (born 1899)
- 12 March – David Lack, British ornithologist and biologist (born 1910)
- 13 March – Melville Cooper, actor (born 1896)
- 26 March – Noël Coward, English composer and playwright (born 1899)
- 30 March – Douglas Douglas-Hamilton, 14th Duke of Hamilton, British politician and Conservative peer (born 1903)

=== April–June ===
- 9 May – Owen Brannigan, English singer (born 1908)
- 11 May – Russell Everitt, English cricketer (born 1881)
- 14 May – A. C. Ewing, British philosopher (born 1899)
- 21 May – Montague Dawson, English maritime painter (born 1890)
- 6 June – Jimmy Clitheroe, aka 'The Clitheroe Kid', English comedian (born 1921)
- 18 June – Roger Delgado, English actor (Doctor Who) (born 1918)

=== July–September ===
- c. July – Kanso Yoshida, seaman related to the Japanese imperial family (born 1895)
- 1 July – Charles Ernest Garforth, English soldier and recipient of the Victoria Cross (born 1891)
- 8 July – Wilfred Rhodes, English cricketer (born 1877)
- 18 July
  - John Brown Hamilton, Scottish soldier and recipient of the Victoria Cross (born 1896)
  - Jack Hawkins, English actor (The Cruel Sea) (born 1910)
- 29 July – Roger Williamson, British race car driver (born 1948)
- 6 August – James Beck, actor (born 1929)
- 15 August – Edward Turner, English motorcycle designer (born 1901)
- 16 August – A. K. Chesterton, South African-born far-right politician and journalist (born 1896)
- 17 August – George Benson, British Labour Party politician (born 1889)
- 18 August – Basil Brooke, 1st Viscount Brookeborough, British Ulster Unionist politician (born 1888)
- 29 August – Stringer Davis, English actor (born 1896)
- 2 September – J. R. R. Tolkien, British writer (born 1892)
- 6 September – William Henry Harris, English organist and composer (born 1883)
- 9 September – Bill Doran, English motorcycle road racer (born 1916)
- 11 September – E. E. Evans-Pritchard, British anthropologist (born 1902)
- 20 September – William Plomer, South African-born novelist, poet and literary editor (born 1903)
- 21 September – C. H. Dodd, Welsh scholar and theologian (born 1884)
- 24 September – Barbara Freyberg, Baroness Freyberg, British peeress
- 25 September – George Porter, British Labour Party politician (born 1884)
- 29 September – W. H. Auden, British-American poet, died in Austria (born 1907)

=== October–December ===
- 4 October – Walter Montagu Douglas Scott, 8th Duke of Buccleuch, British politician and Conservative peer (born 1894)
- 6 October – Dennis Price, actor (born 1915)
- 9 October – Hilda Plowright, English actress (born 1890)
- 25 October – Sir William Whitworth, admiral (born 1884)
- 10 November – Gerald Cock, British broadcasting executive (born 1887)
- 21 November – Sir Roy Fedden, English aircraft engine designer (born 1885)
- 5 December – Sir Robert Watson-Watt, Scottish inventor (born 1892)
- 9 December – Anthony Gilbert (pen name of Lucy Beatrice Malleson), British crime fiction writer (born 1899)
- 13 December – Henry Green, novelist (born 1905)

== See also ==
- 1973 in British music
- 1973 in British television
- List of British films of 1973
