= Snelgrove =

Snelgrove may refer to:

== People ==
- Anne Snelgrove (born 1957), British Labour politician
- Donald Snelgrove (1925–2016), British Anglican priest, the Suffragan Bishop of Hull from 1981 until 1994
- Edwin Snelgrove (born 1960), American serial killer currently serving a 60-year sentence for the murder of Carmen Rodriguez
- Graham Snelgrove (born c. 1940), Canadian political candidate from Ontario
- Josiah Snelgrove (born 1986), Canadian soccer player
- Karen Snelgrove (born 1969), Canadian softball player and Olympian
- Lloyd Snelgrove (born 1956), Canadian politician from Alberta
- Pamela Snelgrove-Paul, Canadian politician from Alberta
- Rabecca Snelgrove (born c. 1989), Canadian reality show contestant from Newfoundland and Labrador
- Ralph Snelgrove (1914–1990), Canadian radio and television pioneer who built television station CKVR-TV in Barrie, Ontario
- Richard Snelgrove, American politician and small business owner from Utah
- Timothy Snelgrove, American businessman known as the founder of Timothy's World Coffee
- Victoria Snelgrove (1982–2004), American college student who was accidentally killed by Boston police
- Wandlyn Snelgrove, Canadian Anglican priest, Archdeacon of Fredericton 2017–2020

== Fictional characters ==
- Greg Snelgrove (Paul Gleeson) from the Australian television soap opera Home and Away (2015–2016)
- Wayne "Tank" Snelgrove (Reece Milne) from the Australian television soap opera Home and Away (2015–2016)

== Places ==
- Snelgrove, Brampton, community in Ontario, Canada, between Brampton and Caledon, centred on Hurontario Street
- Snelgrove's Ice Cream began as a family-owned company in Salt Lake City founded in 1929 by Charles Rich Snelgrove (1887–1976)
- Marshall & Snelgrove, former department store in London, England

== See also ==
- Snellgrove
