= On the Case with Paula Zahn =

American documentary and news program

- Genre: True crime; Documentary
- Starring: Paula Zahn
- Country of origin: United States
- Original language: English
- No. of seasons: 29
- No. of episodes: 407

Production
- Executive producers: Diana Sperrazza; Paula Zahn; Scott Weinberger; Larry Israel; Scott Sternberg
- Running time: 40 to 43 minutes
- Production companies: Weinberger Media; Scott Sternberg Productions

Original release
- Network: Investigation Discovery
- Release: October 18, 2009 – present

On the Case with Paula Zahn is an American documentary and news program broadcast on Investigation Discovery since October 18, 2009. The program explores in-depth stories of crime mysteries and interviews with involved individuals, closest to the cases and includes expert analysis. Emmy Award winning journalist and former CNN anchor Paula Zahn is the program host who travels throughout the country interviewing people directly affected by the tragic cases.

On the Case with Paula Zahn is the first series on Investigation Discovery to reach over 360 episodes.

== Episodes ==
Season	Episodes	Originally released	
Season	Episodes	First released	Last released
1	13	October 18, 2009	January 17, 2010
2	13	April 18, 2010	July 18, 2010
3	13	November 7, 2010	February 13, 2011
4	13	April 17, 2011	July 24, 2011
5	14	October 30, 2011	February 19, 2012
6	12	June 3, 2012	September 2, 2012
7	14	December 16, 2012	March 24, 2013
8	16	June 23, 2013	October 6, 2013
9	16	December 22, 2013	April 13, 2014
10	16	August 3, 2014	November 16, 2014
11	15	February 22, 2015	June 7, 2015
12	17	August 30, 2015	January 3, 2016
13	12	March 6, 2016	June 5, 2016
14	20	August 28, 2016	January 22, 2017
15	13	May 28, 2017	August 20, 2017
16	16	October 29, 2017	April 1, 2018
17	19	July 15, 2018	December 2, 2018
18	16	February 24, 2019	June 30, 2019
19	15	November 3, 2019	January 26, 2020
20	15	April 26, 2020	August 16, 2020
21	9	November 29, 2020	January 31, 2021
22	8	April 4, 2021	May 23, 2021
23	16	August 8, 2021	December 5, 2021
24	16	February 20, 2022	June 26, 2022
25	16	September 4, 2022	January 15, 2023
26	12	May 3, 2023	July 26, 2023
27	8	March 6, 2024	April 24, 2024
28	12	July 9, 2025	September 24, 2025
29	12	April 15, 2026	July 8, 2026

=== Season 1 (2009–10) ===
No. overall	No. in season	Title	Original release date
1	1	"Deadly Lessons"	October 18, 2009
Murder of Ashley Reeves
2	2	"A Murder in Pleasant Valley"	October 25, 2009
Murder of Susan Fassett
3	3	"Honeymoon Hit"	November 1, 2009
Murder of Sandra Rozzo
4	4	"Hit or Miss"	November 8, 2009
Murder of Alexander Algeri
5	5	"Date With Death"	November 15, 2009
Edwin Snelgrove
6	6	"A Death in the Desert"	November 22, 2009
Death of Ted Binion
7	7	"Love You to Death"	November 29, 2009
Murder of Michelle Nyce
8	8	"The Millionaire Murder"	December 6, 2009
The murder of Steven Beard by his wife and her lover
9	9	"Last Stop Murder"	December 13, 2009
Murder of Melanie Goodwin
10	10	"Out of the Ashes"	December 20, 2009
Murder of Sabina Kulakowski
11	11	"A Murder at Echo Lake"	January 3, 2010
Murder of Peggy Perez-Olivo
12	12	"Newlywed Murders"	January 10, 2010
Murders of Dyke and Karen Rhoads
13	13	"The Boy Next Door"	January 17, 2010
Murder of Dinah Peterson

=== Season 2 (2010) ===
No. overall	No. in season	Title	Original release date
14	1	"Beauty and the Beast"	April 18, 2010
Murder of Brooke Wilberger
15	2	"Murder in the Heartland"	April 25, 2010
Murders of Bobie and Marilyn Blewer
16	3	"Twin Killing?"	May 2, 2010
Murder of Jack Wilson
17	4	"A Lamb Amongst Wolves"	May 9, 2010
Murder of Mark Fisher
18	5	"The Long Road Home"	May 16, 2010
Murder of Mischelle Lawless
19	6	"A Killing in Canova Beach"	May 23, 2010
Murder of James Dvorak
20	7	"She Never Came Home"	May 30, 2010
Murder of Melissa Trotter
21	8	"Deadly Delivery"	June 6, 2010
Murder of Betty Mottinger
22	9	"Web of Lies"	June 13, 2010
Murder of Brian Barrett
23	10	"Daddy's Girl"	June 20, 2010
Murder of Kimberly Antonakos
24	11	"Beyond Redemption"	June 27, 2010
Brent Brents
25	12	"Twisted Triangle"	July 11, 2010
Attempted murder of Margo Bennett
26	13	"Aim to Kill"	July 18, 2010
Murder of Danny Paquette

=== Season 3 (2010–11) ===
No. overall	No. in season	Title	Original release date
27	1	"Beauty Queen Killer"	November 7, 2010
Murder of Waymon Keith Gentry
28	2	"Gallaudet Murders"	November 14, 2010
Murder of Eric Plunkett and Benjamin Varner at Gallaudet University
29	3	"Voices in the Dark"	November 21, 2010
Murder of Katie Autry at Western Kentucky University
30	4	"Murder She Wrote"	November 28, 2010
Murder of Bill Stout
31	5	"A Cry in The Night"	December 5, 2010
Murder of Karen Gregory
32	6	"Cheating Death"	December 12, 2010
Attempted murder of Mary Jones
33	7	"Internal Affairs"	December 19, 2010
Murder of Heather Lynn Garraus
34	8	"Run Bambi Run"	January 2, 2011
Laurie Bembenek
35	9	"Sins of the Father"	January 9, 2011
Murder of Lysandra Marie Turpin
36	10	"Blood Betrayal"	January 16, 2011
Murder of Tabatha Bryant
37	11	"Shadow of Doubt"	January 23, 2011
Ray Krone
38	12	"Evil Twin"	January 30, 2011
Larry Hall
39	13	"Dark Side of a Dream"	February 13, 2011
Murder of Kristi Johnson

=== Season 4 (2011) ===
No. overall	No. in season	Title	Original release date
40	1	"Silenced"	April 17, 2011
Murder of Carrie Culberson
41	2	"Message in Blood"	April 24, 2011
Murder of Karen Pannell
42	3	"Race to Judgment"	May 1, 2011
A car crash kills 4 young women at Tatum, Texas
43	4	"A Tangled Past"	May 8, 2011
Murder of Margaret Bradley
44	5	"Campus Killer"	May 29, 2011
Murder of Taylor Behl
45	6	"Murder by Numbers"	June 5, 2011
Murder of Bobby Wilson
46	7	"Under Suspicion"	June 12, 2011
Murder of Jami Sherer
47	8	"A Mother's Nightmare"	June 19, 2011
Tommy Lynn Sells
48	9	"A Murder at Loose Chippings"	June 26, 2011
Jens Söring and Elizabeth Haysom
49	10	"Betrayal at Charisma Farms"	July 3, 2011
Murder of Robert Dorotik
50	11	"Mystery in the Mountains"	July 10, 2011
51	12	"A Slip of Fate"	July 17, 2011
52	13	"Murder Ordained?"	July 24, 2011
Murder of Sandra Bird

=== Season 5 (2011–12) ===
No. overall	No. in season	Title	Original release date
53	1	"In Broad Daylight"	October 30, 2011
Murder of Heather Strube
54	2	"Death and the Doctor"	November 6, 2011
Murder of Margo Prade
55	3	"Severed Ties"	November 13, 2011
Mark Woodworth
56	4	"No One To Trust"	November 20, 2011
Murder of Lisa Marie Kimmell
57	5	"A Stranger's Knock"	December 4, 2011
Murder of Norma Ates
58	6	"Twice Is No Accident"	December 11, 2011
John Smith
59	7	"Lost In The Fire"	December 18, 2011
Murder of Lucy Johnson
60	8	"Last Rites"	January 8, 2012
Murder of Margaret Ann Pahl
61	9	"Secrets From the Grave"	January 15, 2012
Murder of Jessica Keen
62–63	10–11	"Murder at Sunset: Part 1/Murder at Sunset: Part 2"	January 22, 2012
Oba Chandler
64	12	"Left in the Dark"	January 29, 2012
Murder of Johnia Berry
65	13	"The Art of Murder"	February 12, 2012
Murder of Samantha “Shelley” Nance
66	14	"Unmasking a Killer"	February 19, 2012
Murder of Jayna Murray

=== Season 6 (2012) ===
No. overall	No. in season	Title	Original release date
67	1	"Mystery in the Desert"	June 3, 2012
Murders of Joyce Sterrenberg and Tim McKillop
68	2	"Innocent Witness"	June 10, 2012
Murder of Rhonda Boggs
69	3	"Dirty Secrets"	June 17, 2012
Rosendo Rodriguez
70	4	"Over the Edge"	June 24, 2012
Murder of Wendy Kratzert
71	5	"Hanging by a Thread"	July 1, 2012
Bobby Joe Long
72	6	"The River's Edge"	July 8, 2012
Murder of Stacy Fairchild
73	7	"A Deadly Betrayal"	July 15, 2012
Murder of James V. Madonna
74	8	"No Exit"	July 22, 2012
Alfredo Prieto
75	9	"Fatal Footage"	July 29, 2012
Juan Covington
76	10	"Vanished in the Night"	August 19, 2012
Murder of Lynsie Ekelund
77	11	"Taken"	August 26, 2012
Richard Evonitz
78	12	"Murder at Bird Key"	September 2, 2012
Murder of John Allaman

=== Season 7 (2012–13) ===
No. overall	No. in season	Title	Original release date
79	1	"A Tale Tell Call"	December 16, 2012
Murder of Jackie Casseteri
80	2	"Painful Memories"	December 23, 2012
Gerald Parker
81	3	"Profile of a Killer"	December 30, 2012
Murder of Karla Brown
82	4	"Final Words"	January 6, 2013
Murder of Shauna Card
83	5	"A Knock on the Door"	January 13, 2013
Murder of Sandra Martin
84	6	"Snapshot to Murder"	January 20, 2013
Murder of Julie Connell
85	7	"A Deadly Secret"	January 27, 2013
Murder of Dana Satterfield
86	8	"Murder at Sunrise"	February 10, 2013
Murder of Vickie Long
87	9	"The Day After Christmas"	February 17, 2013
Murder of Craig Nail
88	10	"One Month of Terror"	February 24, 2013
Larry Gene Bell
89	11	"Driven to Kill"	March 3, 2013
Murder of Joann Katrinak
90	12	"A Long Journey to Justice"	March 10, 2013
Murder of Kathy Whorton & Henry Lee Lucas
91	13	"The Ultimate Sin"	March 17, 2013
Murder of Tracy Fresquez
92	14	"Signed in Blood"	March 24, 2013
Murders of Richard and Karla VanDusen

=== Season 8 (2013) ===
No. overall	No. in season	Title	Original release date
93	1	"Tangled Web"	June 23, 2013
Murder of Richard Schoeck
94	2	"Bound By the Truth"	June 30, 2013
Murder of Kay Mortensen
95	3	"Smoke and Ashes"	July 7, 2013
Murder of Kemberly Wenger
96	4	"Veil of Suspicion"	July 14, 2013
Murder of Thomas Lee Sehorne
97	5	"At Death's Door"	July 21, 2013
Attempted murder of Kaye Robinson
98	6	"Hidden in Plain Sight"	July 28, 2013
Murder of Marcia Trimble
99	7	"The Killer Rang Twice"	August 4, 2013
Roger Eugene Fain
100	8	"Justice Never Quits"	August 11, 2013
Murder of Sarah Johnson
101	9	"Tip 1960"	August 18, 2013
Murder of Katie Poirier
102	10	"Nine Days of Terror"	August 25, 2013
Murder of Dru Sjodin
103	11	"Lying in Wait"	September 1, 2013
Alexander Wayne Watson
104	12	"A Fateful Decision"	September 8, 2013
Murder of Shannon Sanderson
105	13	"A Thin Disguise"	September 15, 2013
106	14	"Ring of Truth"	September 22, 2013
Murder of Cori Daye Desmond
107	15	"A Call for Justice"	September 29, 2013
John Gordon Purvis
108	16	"Twisted Obsession"	October 6, 2013
Murder of Laura McNaughton

=== Season 9 (2013–14) ===
No. overall	No. in season	Title	Original release date
109	1	"Stabbed in the Heart"	December 22, 2013
Murder of Frances Carriere
110	2	"This is for Her"	December 29, 2013
Murder of Ron Stovall
111	3	"Deadly Predator"	January 5, 2014
Murder of April Sima and Rebecca Carlson
112	4	"Kidnapped on the 4th of July"	January 12, 2014
William Scott Smith
113	5	"An Uninvited Guest"	January 19, 2014
Murder of Rita Cobb
114	6	"Trail of Carnage"	January 26, 2014
Steven Ray Thacker
115	7	"Cry on My Shoulder"	February 9, 2014
Murder of Dena Raley
116	8	"Footprints and Whispers"	February 16, 2014
Murder of Carolyn and John Tarwacki
117	9	"Heartbreak in the Heartland"	February 23, 2014
Abercrombie Family Murders
118	10	"Evidence of Deception"	March 2, 2014
Murder of Stacie Pannell
119	11	"Fatal Turn"	March 9, 2014
Murder of Patsy Lasserre
120	12	"Footsteps in the Dark"	March 16, 2014
Murder of Michelle McGrath
121	13	"A Killer in Disguise"	March 23, 2014
Steven Oken
122	14	"She Wasn't Alone"	March 30, 2014
Murder of Savannah Anderson
123	15	"Almost Home"	April 6, 2014
Murder of Jamie Hart and Carolyn Casey
124	16	"The Long Path to Justice"	April 13, 2014
Murder of Irene Kennedy

=== Season 10 (2014) ===
No. overall	No. in season	Title	Original release date
125	1	"Snakes in the Grass"	August 3, 2014
Murder of Jessica McHenry
126	2	"For Love and Duty"	August 10, 2014
Murder of Catherine Walsh
127	3	"Solemn Vows"	August 17, 2014
Murder of Deborah Jean McCormick
128	4	"Trail of Tears"	August 24, 2014
Murder of Judy Spencer
129	5	"A Murder in Pelham"	August 31, 2014
Murder of Josephine O’Keefe
130	6	"A Father's Quest"	September 7, 2014
Murder of Ali Kemp
131	7	"Pattern of Violence"	September 14, 2014
Murder of Michelle Anglin
132	8	"Field of Nightmares"	September 21, 2014
Murders of Roxann and Christopher Jeeves
133	9	"Path of Destruction"	September 28, 2014
Patrick Baxter
134	10	"A Drop of Blood"	October 5, 2014
Murder of Vicki Knight
135	11	"The Green Dragon"	October 12, 2014
Murders of Jack and Linda Myers
136	12	"Murder in Room 205"	October 19, 2014
David Bruce Morton
137	13	"Betrayal and Regret"	October 26, 2014
Murder of Anastasia WitbolsFeugen
138	14	"A Ray of Darkness"	November 2, 2014
Murder of Janice Nugent and LeAnne Coryell
139	15	"Unmistakable Truth"	November 9, 2014
Wanstrath Family Murders
140	16	"Trapped by Lies"	November 16, 2014
Murder of Katie Hamlin

=== Season 11 (2015) ===
No. overall	No. in season	Title	Original release date
141	1	"In Plain Sight"	February 22, 2015
David Bruce Morton
142	2	"Hidden by Fire"	March 1, 2015
Murder of Beth Bosworth
143	3	"A Nightmare in Memphis"	March 8, 2015
Murder of Debbie Groseclose
144	4	"Deadly Warning"	March 15, 2015
145	5	"Where Evil Lies"	March 22, 2015
Speed Freak Killers
146	6	"Blurred Truth"	March 29, 2015
147	7	"Blood Money"	April 5, 2015
Murder of Bradley Perry
148	8	"A Window to Murder"	April 12, 2015
Murder of Mary Michele Fleming
149	9	"A Terrible Secret"	April 19, 2015
Murder of Robyn Star Field
150	10	"Last Call"	April 26, 2015
Roy Melanson
151	11	"A Mystery in Cherry Hill"	May 10, 2015
Murder of Dede Rosenthal
152	12	"A Fatal Errand"	May 17, 2015
Murder of Quenette Shehane
153	13	"Scent of a Killer"	May 24, 2015
Murder of Sandra Iverson
154	14	"Evil Repeats Itself"	May 31, 2015
Murder of Mary Jayne Jones
155	15	"Screams for Justice"	June 7, 2015
Murder of Elodie Ann Thornburg

=== Season 12 (2015–16) ===
No. overall	No. in season	Title	Original release date
156	1	"A Harvest of Grief"	August 30, 2015
Murder of Lora Beth Williamson
157	2	"Eyes of a Killer"	September 6, 2015
Murder of Patricia Ann Greenfield
158	3	"Shortcut to Murder"	September 13, 2015
Murder of Tina Faelz
159	4	"A Wave Goodbye"	September 20, 2015
Murder of Katherine Devine
160	5	"Hidden by Lies"	September 27, 2015
Murder of Lisa McCracken
161	6	"A Killer in Town"	October 4, 2015
Michael Lee Lockhart
162	7	"Desperate Cry"	October 11, 2015
Murder of Carolyn Clift
163	8	"A Killer in the Sun"	October 25, 2015
Murder of Kathy Baker
164	9	"Shattered Hope"	November 1, 2015
Murder of Shelley Sikes
165	10	"A Hole in their Hearts"	November 8, 2015
Murder of Hellen Hanks
166	11	"Golden Promises Broken"	November 15, 2015
Murders of Cynthia Rediger and John Futch
167	12	"Darkness After Dawn"	November 22, 2015
Murder of Sandra Howard
168	13	"Same Crime Next Year"	November 29, 2015
Murders of Diane Markland and Brenda Rucker
169	14	"River of Sadness"	December 13, 2015
Murder of Shawna Yandell
170	15	"Crossed by Evil"	December 20, 2015
Ripper Crew
171	16	"Deadly Silence"	December 27, 2015
Murder of Shannon Siders
172	17	"The Pastor's Wife"	January 3, 2016
Murder of Norma Page

=== Season 13 (2016) ===
No. overall	No. in season	Title	Original release date
173	1	"Deep Wounds"	March 6, 2016
David Allen Lucas
174	2	"Gone in an Instant"	March 13, 2016
Richard Grissom
175	3	"Betrayal in Big Cottonwood Canyon"	March 20, 2016
Murder of Barbara Rocky
176	4	"Tracks of a Killer"	March 27, 2016
Murder of Briana Rabon
177	5	"Racing Justice"	April 10, 2016
Murder of Cindy Albrecht
178	6	"A Last Dance"	April 17, 2016
Murder of Eva Garcia
179	7	"A Promise Kept"	April 24, 2016
Murder of Roylene Alexander
180	8	"Deadly Offer"	May 8, 2016
Roger Kibbe
181	9	"Mixed Signals"	May 15, 2016
Murder of Maxina Danner
182	10	"Courage and Conviction"	May 22, 2016
Sebastian Shaw
183	11	"Half Way Home"	May 29, 2016
Murder of Carolyn Sarkesians
184	12	"The Doorbell Rang"	June 5, 2016
Murder of Theresa Burns

=== Season 14 (2016–17) ===
No. overall	No. in season	Title	Original release date
185	1	"22 Hours of Terror"	August 28, 2016
186	2	"Broken Trust"	September 4, 2016
187	3	"Deceiving Appearances"	September 11, 2016
188	4	"The Answer Was No"	September 18, 2016
189	5	"A Nightmare in Laurel"	September 25, 2016
190	6	"Followed Home"	October 2, 2016
191	7	"Path of Tears"	October 9, 2016
192	8	"Predator on the Loose"	October 16, 2016
193	9	"Blood and Betrayal"	October 23, 2016
194	10	"A Killer Among Friends"	October 30, 2016
195	11	"From Dusk to Darkness"	November 6, 2016
196	12	"Deadly Paper Trail"	November 13, 2016
197	13	"Dreams and Nightmares"	November 20, 2016
198	14	"Blood, Sweat and Tears"	November 27, 2016
199	15	"Unfinished Journey"	December 4, 2016
200	16	"Identical Evidence"	December 11, 2016
201	17	"Mystery, Heartbreak and Justice"	December 18, 2016
202	18	"A Betrayal Concealed"	January 1, 2017
203	19	"A Hidden Clue"	January 8, 2017
204	20	"A Face with No Name"	January 22, 2017

=== Season 15 (2017) ===
No. overall	No. in season	Title	Original release date
205	1	"Deadly Deception"	May 28, 2017
206	2	"Darkness in The Desert"	June 4, 2017
207	3	"The East Area Rapist"	June 11, 2017
208	4	"Haunting Memories"	June 18, 2017
209	5	"Murder in Store"	June 25, 2017
210	6	"A Stranger Among Us"	July 2, 2017
211	7	"Greed, Lies and Murder"	July 9, 2017
212	8	"Deadly Riddle"	July 16, 2017
213	9	"Trail of Betrayal"	July 23, 2017
214	10	"A Deadly Omen"	July 30, 2017
215	11	"Unanswered Questions"	August 6, 2017
216	12	"Sirens in the Night"	August 13, 2017
217	13	"River of Tears"	August 20, 2017

=== Season 16 (2017–18) ===
No. overall	No. in season	Title	Original release date
218	1	"A Nightmare in Idaho Falls"	October 29, 2017
219	2	"Stolen Dreams"	November 5, 2017
220	3	"Twisted Lies"	November 12, 2017
221	4	"Deadly Hymn"	November 19, 2017
222	5	"That's Him!"	November 26, 2017
223	6	"Stacy's Story"	January 7, 2018
224	7	"A Murder in Coralville"	January 21, 2018
225	8	"A Predator in Deerfield"	January 28, 2018
226	9	"In the Blink of an Eye"	February 11, 2018
227	10	"In the Shadows of Home"	February 18, 2018
228	11	"Scattered Clues, Shattered Lives"	February 25, 2018
229	12	"As She Lay Dying"	March 4, 2018
230	13	"River of Sorrow"	March 11, 2018
231	14	"A Lifetime of Questions"	March 18, 2018
232	15	"Last Night Before Murder"	March 25, 2018
233	16	"A Daughter's Quest"	April 1, 2018

=== Season 17 (2018) ===
No. overall	No. in season	Title	Original release date
234	1	"Notes from a Killer"	July 15, 2018
235	2	"Long Sought Truth"	July 22, 2018
236	3	"A Different Time"	July 29, 2018
237	4	"Where's Crystal"	August 5, 2018
238	5	"Terror in Waupaca"	August 12, 2018
239	6	"Taken From Her Bed"	August 26, 2018
240	7	"A Bridge Too Far"	September 2, 2018
241	8	"Shifting Stories"	September 9, 2018
242	9	"Terrifying Clues"	September 16, 2018
243	10	"Buried Dreams"	September 23, 2018
244	11	"In The Dead of Night"	September 30, 2018
245	12	"Lethal Offer"	October 7, 2018
246	13	"The Depths of Evil"	October 14, 2018
247	14	"Unchecked Violence"	October 21, 2018
248	15	"No Goodbyes"	November 4, 2018
249	16	"History Repeats Itself"	November 11, 2018
250	17	"A Face and a Voice"	November 18, 2018
251	18	"Alone With Evil"	November 25, 2018
252	19	"Blood Secrets"	December 2, 2018

=== Season 18 (2019) ===
No. overall	No. in season	Title	Original release date
253	1	"A Hero Betrayed"	February 24, 2019
254	2	"She's Gone"	March 3, 2019
255	3	"While Her Children Slept"	March 10, 2019
256	4	"Rumors, Lies and Murder"	March 17, 2019
257	5	"Good Morning, Goodnight and Goodbye"	March 24, 2019
258	6	"Smoke and Lies"	March 31, 2019
259	7	"A Handful of Coins"	April 14, 2019
260	8	"Before Her Eyes"	April 21, 2019
261	9	"Never the Same"	April 28, 2019
262	10	"The Truth Never Dies"	May 5, 2019
263	11	"Cloud of Darkness"	May 12, 2019
264	12	"Rocky Mountain Mystery"	May 19, 2019
265	13	"Nowhere to Run"	May 26, 2019
266	14	"Capitol Murder"	June 9, 2019
267	15	"Connected by Murder"	June 23, 2019
268	16	"A Life Halted"	June 30, 2019

=== Season 19 (2019–20) ===
No. overall	No. in season	Title	Original release date
269	1	"Driven to Murder"	November 3, 2019
270	2	"In Defiance of Evil"	November 10, 2019
271	3	"The Disappearance of Sarah Stern"	November 17, 2019
272	4	"Twisted Justice"	November 24, 2019
273	5	"A Dream Shattered"	November 24, 2019
274	6	"Classified Murder"	December 1, 2019
275	7	"A Mystery in Indio"	December 1, 2019
276	8	"A Secret to Kill For"	December 8, 2019
277	9	"Officer Down"	December 15, 2019
278	10	"Seven Minutes of Terror"	December 22, 2019
279	11	"Betrayal in the Mountains"	December 29, 2019
280	12	"Terrifying Calls"	January 5, 2020
281	13	"One of Their Own"	January 12, 2020
282	14	"The Hero Who Wasn't"	January 19, 2020
283	15	"No Body, Two Crimes"	January 26, 2020

=== Season 20 (2020) ===
No. overall	No. in season	Title	Original release date
284	1	"Shadow of Suspicion"	April 26, 2020
285	2	"One of Us"	May 3, 2020
286	3	"Salt in the Wound"	May 10, 2020
287	4	"Wedding Day Nightmare"	May 17, 2020
288	5	"Little Lamb"	May 24, 2020
289	6	"Terror in Bedford Park"	June 7, 2020
290	7	"Evidence Never Lies"	June 14, 2020
291	8	"Long Walk, Cold Night"	June 21, 2020
292	9	"Texts, Lies and Videotape"	June 28, 2020
293	10	"A Predator in the Woods"	July 5, 2020
294	11	"In the Wind"	July 12, 2020
295	12	"Lying in the Darkness"	July 26, 2020
296	13	"Spreadsheet of Terror"	August 2, 2020
297	14	"A Test of Patience"	August 9, 2020
298	15	"A Heartbreaking Discovery"	August 16, 2020

=== Season 21 (2020–21) ===
No. overall	No. in season	Title	Original release date
299	1	"Crime and Injustice"	November 29, 2020
300	2	"A Murder in Thunderbolt"	December 6, 2020
301	3	"A Jewel Stolen"	December 13, 2020
302	4	"When, Where and Who?"	December 27, 2020
303	5	"Follow the Footprints"	January 3, 2021
304	6	"Christina's Story"	January 10, 2021
305	7	"A Brand New Dress"	January 17, 2021
306	8	"Gone in Less Than 3 Minutes"	January 24, 2021
307	9	"A Storm of Rage"	January 31, 2021

=== Season 22 (2021) ===
No. overall	No. in season	Title	Original release date
308	1	"A Wolf in Sheep's Clothing"	April 4, 2021
309	2	"A Complicated Relationship"	April 11, 2021
310	3	"A Blue Raincoat"	April 18, 2021
311	4	"It Won't End Well"	April 25, 2021
312	5	"Clearing The Docket"	May 2, 2021
313	6	"Follow That Car"	May 9, 2021
314	7	"Cali-Doe"	May 16, 2021
315	8	"Evidence Lost, Justice Found"	May 23, 2021

=== Season 23 (2021) ===
No. overall	No. in season	Title	Original release date
316	1	"Devil in a Cowboy Hat"	August 8, 2021
317	2	"Trail of a Monster"	August 15, 2021
318	3	"Circled by Vultures"	August 22, 2021
319	4	"Terrifying Connections"	August 29, 2021
320	5	"What Happened to Sarah"	September 12, 2021
321	6	"Terror in Terre Haute"	September 19, 2021
322	7	"Justice for Angie"	September 26, 2021
323	8	"The Smallest of Clues"	October 3, 2021
324	9	"No Escape"	October 10, 2021
325	10	"Web of Torment"	October 17, 2021
326	11	"Unthinkable Harm"	October 24, 2021
327	12	"Gone in a Blink"	October 31, 2021
328	13	"Alarm and Betrayal"	November 7, 2021
329	14	"A Cracked Alibi"	November 14, 2021
330	15	"A Secret Meeting"	November 21, 2021
331	16	""Precious" Jane Doe"	December 5, 2021

=== Season 24 (2022) ===
No. overall	No. in season	Title	Original release date
332	1	"A Mother Knows"	February 20, 2022
333	2	"Hauntingly Familiar"	February 27, 2022
334	3	"Capable of Murder"	March 6, 2022
335	4	"Dark Clouds Lead to a Storm"	March 13, 2022
336	5	"FLRT 12"	March 20, 2022
337	6	"Blood Reveals the Sword"	March 27, 2022
338	7	"Hammer and Dust"	April 3, 2022
339	8	"Dance to Doom"	April 17, 2022
340	9	"Don't Open The Door"	April 24, 2022
341	10	"Eyes in the Darkness"	May 1, 2022
342	11	"Shadowy Figures"	May 8, 2022
343	12	"Where Is Miya?"	May 15, 2022
344	13	"The Smallest Clue"	May 29, 2022
345	14	"A Spider Web of Tragedy"	June 5, 2022
346	15	"A Needle in the Mud"	June 12, 2022
347	16	"Lost Life, Evidence Found"	June 26, 2022

=== Season 25 (2022–23) ===
No. overall	No. in season	Title	Original release date
348	1	"From Zero to Murder"	September 4, 2022
349	2	"Jenny's Story"	September 11, 2022
350	3	"Graduation to Murder"	September 18, 2022
351	4	"Room 106"	October 2, 2022
352	5	"Changing Stories"	October 9, 2022
353	6	"The Year of Fear"	October 16, 2022
354	7	"A Fairy Tale Ruined"	October 30, 2022
355	8	"The Mother She Never Knew"	November 6, 2022
356	9	"Unthinkable Betrayal"	November 13, 2022
357	10	"A Call for Answers"	November 20, 2022
358	11	"A Bad Man Hurt Mommy"	December 4, 2022
359	12	"Blood-Stained Reputation"	December 11, 2022
360	13	"New Year's Eve Nightmare"	December 18, 2022
361	14	"Disconnected Story"	January 1, 2023
362	15	"Confessions and Lies"	January 8, 2023
363	16	"Pretty Pink Bicycle"	January 15, 2023

=== Season 26 (2023) ===
No. overall	No. in season	Title	Original release date
364	1	"Follow the Blood"	May 3, 2023
365	2	"Faith and Duty"	May 10, 2023
366	3	"Justice Frozen"	May 17, 2023
367	4	"A Lifetime of Grief"	May 24, 2023
368	5	"Voice for the Nameless"	June 7, 2023
369	6	"Tragedy in Visalia"	June 14, 2023
370	7	"A Quest for Justice"	June 21, 2023
371	8	"Text, Lies and Video"	June 28, 2023
372	9	"Where is Jonelle?"	July 5, 2023
373	10	"A Murder in Red Cliff"	July 12, 2023
374	11	"Righting a Wrong"	July 19, 2023
375	12	"Love Lost, Justice Found"	July 26, 2023

=== Season 27 (2024) ===
No. overall	No. in season	Title	Original release date
376	1	"Wrong Place, Wrong Time"	March 6, 2024
377	2	"Where He Belongs"	March 13, 2024
378	3	"Dissecting a Triangle"	March 20, 2024
379	4	"An American Tragedy"	March 27, 2024
380	5	"When the Music's Over"	April 3, 2024
381	6	"A Murder at Paradise Ranch"	April 10, 2024
382	7	"The Bitter Truth"	April 17, 2024
383	8	"Where is Alexis?"	April 24, 2024

=== Season 28 (2025) ===
No. overall	No. in season	Title	Original release date
384	1	"A Nightmare at Dawn"	July 9, 2025
385	2	"A Picture Worth a 1000 Words"	July 16, 2025
386	3	"Trail of Terror"	July 23, 2025
387	4	"Why Would Someone Shoot Amanda?"	July 30, 2025
388	5	"A Mystery in Lakeland"	August 6, 2025
389	6	"Lost but Not Forgotten"	August 13, 2025
390	7	"A Bridge to Disaster"	August 20, 2025
391	8	"Justice for Christine"	August 27, 2025
392	9	"Vanished into Darkness"	September 3, 2025
393	10	"A Deadly Message"	September 10, 2025
394	11	"Footsteps in the Night"	September 17, 2025
395	12	"Evil at its Highest Point"	September 24, 2025

=== Season 29 (2026) ===
No. overall	No. in season	Title	Original release date
396	1	"Edge of the Abyss"	April 15, 2026
397	2	"Layers of Betrayal"	April 22, 2026
398	3	"Caught in a Trap"	April 29, 2026
399	4	"Unseen Danger"	May 6, 2026
400	5	"Through the Smoke"	May 13, 2026
401	6	"Who Killed Katelyn?"	May 20, 2026
402	7	"Unmasking the Truth"	May 27, 2026
403	8	"Two Fires, One Match"	June 3, 2026
404	9	"Elusive Justice"	June 17, 2026
405	10	"Moving Target"	June 24, 2026
406	11	"Irreparable Loss"	July 1, 2026
407	12	"A Personal Mission"	July 8, 2026
