= David Lucas =

David Lucas is the name of:

== Sports ==
- David Lucas (cricketer) (born 1978), English cricketer
- David Lucas (footballer) (born 1977), English footballer
- David Lucas (handballer), Australian handballer; see 2004 Pacific Handball Cup
- Dave Lucas (ice hockey) (1932–2025), Canadian ice hockey player
- David Lucas (discus thrower), winner of the 2018 weight throw at the NCAA Division I Indoor Track and Field Championships

== Others ==
- David Lucas (composer) (born 1937), American rock and roll producer and jingle writer
- David Lucas (engraver) (1802–1881), English mezzotint engraver
- David Lucas (American politician) (born 1950), state senator from Georgia (U.S. state)
- Dave Lucas (poet) (born 1980), American poet and essayist
- David Lucas (Spanish politician) (1968–2026), Spanish politician
- David Allen Lucas (born 1956), American serial killer
- Steve Blum (born 1960), American voice actor who has been credited by this name
