= Unsworth (surname) =

Unsworth is an English toponymic surname, derived from Unsworth near Bury in the historic county of Lancashire. Notable people with the surname include:

- Andrew E. Unsworth, American organist
- Barrie Unsworth (born 1934), Australian politician
- Barry Unsworth (1930–2012), English writer
- Cathi Unsworth, English writer and journalist
- David Unsworth (born 1973), English footballer and manager
- Dylan Unsworth (born 1992), South African baseball player
- Edgar Unsworth (1906–2006), British lawyer and judge
- Emma Jane Unsworth (born 1978), British writer
- Fran Unsworth (born 1957), British media executive and journalist
- Geoffrey Unsworth (1914–1978), British cinematographer
- James Unsworth (cricketer) (1844–1893), English cricketer
- James Unsworth (entertainer) (1835–1875), English minstrel show comedian
- Ken Unsworth, Australian artist
- Laura Unsworth (born 1988), English field hockey player
- Lee Unsworth (born 1973), English footballer
- Phil Unsworth (born 1963), English cricketer
- Simon Kurt Unsworth (born 1972), English writer
- William Frederick Unsworth (1851–1912), English architect
