= Snellgrove =

Snellgrove is a surname. Notable people with the surname include:

- David Snellgrove (1920–2016), British Tibetologist
- David Snellgrove (born 1967), British cricketer
- Hannah Snellgrove (born 1990), British Olympic sailor
- Ken Snellgrove (1941–2009), British cricketer
