= Oddy =

Oddy is a surname. Notable people with the name include:

- Andrew Oddy (born 1942), British conservation scientist
- Christine Oddy (1955–2014), British politician
- John James Oddy, British politician
- Mike Oddy (1937–2016), Scottish squash player
- Steven Oddy (born 1979), English cricketer

== See also ==
- Oddi (surname)
- Oddie
- Oddy test
