= Matt Parkinson =

Matt Parkinson can refer to:

- Matt Parkinson (comedian), Australian comedian
- Matt Parkinson (cricketer) (born 1996), English cricketer
- Matthew Parkinson (born 1972), English cricketer
