= Darron Foy =

English cricketer

Personal information
- Full name: Darron Townley Foy
- Born: 8 March 1971 (age 55); Bury, Greater Manchester, England
- Batting: Right-handed
- Bowling: Right-arm fast-medium

Domestic team information
- Years: Team
- 2000: Lancashire Cricket Board

Career statistics
Competition	LA
Matches	2
Runs scored	23
Batting average	11.50
100s/50s	–/–
Top score	19
Balls bowled	106
Wickets	1
Bowling average	1/36
5 wickets in innings	–
10 wickets in match	–
Best bowling	63.00
Catches/stumpings	–/–
- Source: Cricinfo, 14 November 2010

Darron Townley 'Biffer' Foy (born 8 March 1971) is a former English cricketer. Foy was a right-handed batsman who bowled right-arm fast-medium. He was born in Bury, Greater Manchester.

Foy represented the Lancashire Cricket Board in 2 List A matches against the Netherlands in the 1999 NatWest Trophy and Suffolk in the 2000 NatWest Trophy. In his 2 List A matches, he scored 23 runs at a batting average of 11.50, with a high score of 19. With the ball he took a single wicket at a cost of 63 runs, with best figures of 1/36.

Although Townley did not reach the heights in the professional game his potential promised, he has gone on to become a tremendous asset to many local clubs (more clubs than Tiger Woods comes to mind) in the Bolton leagues. His quick bowling and aggressive nature could strike fear into many an amateur player. This was summed up in the early 90s whilst playing for the 5-finger team Darcy Lever in the BDCA when he won the 'Professional of the Year' for an outstanding season.

The 2000s proved to be an up and down decade for Townley; his increasing age and years of wear and tear has cost him his pace but he now uses the guile and experience that decades of league cricket has brought. He has also battled against his weight but toward the end of the decade had lost a significant amount and returned to league cricket with BDCA team Walshaw CC, winning another league title in his first year back. This feat brought him to the attention of Woodbank CC who offered him a large fee to be their professional for the 2010 season.
