= Andrew Mercer (cricketer) =

English cricketer

Personal information
- Full name: Andrew James Mercer
- Born: 31 May 1979 (age 47); Blackburn, Lancashire, England
- Batting: Right-handed
- Bowling: Right-arm fast-medium

Domestic team information
- Years: Team
- 2002: Lancashire Cricket Board

Career statistics
Competition	List A
Matches	2
Runs scored	–
Batting average	–
100s/50s	–
Top score	–
Balls bowled	120
Wickets	6
Bowling average	8.16
5 wickets in innings	0
10 wickets in match	0
Best bowling	4/26
Catches/stumpings	0/–
- Source: Cricinfo, 14 November 2010

Andrew James Mercer (born 31 May 1979) is a former first class English cricketer. Mercer batted right hand and bowled right-arm fast medium. He was born according to records in Blackburn, Lancashire.

Mercer represented the Lancashire Cricket Board in two List A matches against Oxfordshire and Scotland in the 1st and 2nd rounds of the 2003 Cheltenham & Gloucester Trophy which were played towards the end of the 2002 season. In his two matches he took six wickets at a bowling average of 8.16, with best figures of 4/26.
