= Jonathon Harvey =

English cricketer (born 1969)

Personal information
- Full name: Jonathon David Harvey
- Born: 18 December 1969 (age 56); Burnley, Lancashire, England
- Batting: Right-handed
- Role: Wicketkeeper
- Relatives: Mark Harvey (brother)

Domestic team information
- Years: Team
- 1999 & 2001: Lancashire Cricket Board
- 1992–1993: Hertfordshire
- 1991: Durham

Career statistics
Competition	LA
Matches	3
Runs scored	39
Batting average	13.00
100s/50s	–/–
Top score	20
Balls bowled	–
Wickets	–
Bowling average	–
5 wickets in innings	–
10 wickets in match	–
Best bowling	–
Catches/stumpings	3/–
- Source: Cricinfo, 14 November 2010

Jonathon David Harvey (born 18 December 1969) is a former English cricketer. Harvey was a right-handed batsman who played primarily as a wicketkeeper. He was born in Burnley, Lancashire.

Harvey made his debut in County Cricket for Durham in the 1991 Minor Counties Championship against Northumberland. He played one further Championship match for the county in that season against Norfolk. At the end of the 1991 season, Durham were elevated to first-class status and Harvey's services were no longer required.

In 1992, he joined Hertfordshire, making his debut for the county in the Minor Counties Championship against Bedfordshire. From 1992 to 1993, he represented the county in 7 Championship matches, the last of which came against Cambridgeshire. In 1993, he represented the county in 2 MCCA Knockout Trophy matches against Bedfordshire and Staffordshire, as well as playing his debut List A match against Gloucestershire in the 1993 NatWest Trophy.

Harvey later represented the Lancashire Cricket Board in 2 List A matches against the Netherlands in the 1999 NatWest Trophy and the Yorkshire Cricket Board in the 2001 Cheltenham & Gloucester Trophy. In his total of 3 List A matches, he scored 39 runs at a batting average of 13.00, with a high score of 20. Behind the stumps he took 3 catches.

His brother, Mark, played first-class cricket for Lancashire.

More recently, he played in the Lancashire League for Burnley as Professional, before moving to Read in 2008.
