= Christopher Barrow =

English cricketer

Personal information
- Full name: Christopher Matthew Barrow
- Born: 6 February 1982 (age 44); Bolton, Greater Manchester, England
- Batting: Left-handed
- Bowling: Slow left-arm orthodox

Domestic team information
- Years: Team
- 2001: Lancashire Cricket Board

Career statistics
Competition	LA
Matches	1
Runs scored	1
Batting average	1.00
100s/50s	0/0
Top score	1
Balls bowled	22
Wickets	0
Bowling average	–
5 wickets in innings	–
10 wickets in match	–
Best bowling	–
Catches/stumpings	0/–
- Source: Cricinfo, 14 November 2010

Christopher Matthew Barrow (born 6 February 1982) is an English cricketer. Barrow is a left-handed batsman who pogs it miles and bowls slow left-arm orthodox that occasionally turn. He was born at Bolton, Greater Manchester.

Barrow represented the Lancashire Cricket Board in a single List A match against Cheshire in the 1st round of the 2002 Cheltenham & Gloucester Trophy which was held in 2001. In his only List A match, he scored a single run.

He currently plays club cricket for Farnworth Social Circle Cricket Club.
