= Russell Edmonds =

English cricketer

Personal information
- Full name: Russell Stuart Edmonds
- Born: 9 September 1977 (age 49); Blackburn, Lancashire, England
- Batting: Right-handed
- Role: Wicketkeeper

Domestic team information
- Years: Team
- 2000: Lancashire Cricket Board

Career statistics
Competition	LA
Matches	2
Runs scored	15
Batting average	15.00
100s/50s	–/–
Top score	15*
Balls bowled	–
Wickets	–
Bowling average	–
5 wickets in innings	–
10 wickets in match	–
Best bowling	–
Catches/stumpings	1/1
- Source: Cricinfo, 14 November 2010

Russell Stuart Edmonds (born 9 September 1977) is a former English cricketer. Edmonds was a right-handed batsman who played primarily as a wicketkeeper. He was born in Blackburn, Lancashire.

Edmonds represented the Lancashire Cricket Board in 2 List A matches against Suffolk and the Essex Cricket Board in the 2000 NatWest Trophy. In his 2 List A matches, he scored 15 runs at a batting average of 15.00, with a high score of 15*. Behind the stumps he took a single catch and made a single stumping.
