= Paul Green (cricketer) =

English cricketer

Personal information
- Full name: Paul Green
- Born: 1 June 1976 (age 50); Salford, Greater Manchester, England
- Batting: Right-handed
- Bowling: Right-arm medium

Domestic team information
- Years: Team
- 1999–2002: Lancashire Cricket Board

Career statistics
Competition	LA
Matches	6
Runs scored	107
Batting average	21.40
100s/50s	–/1
Top score	63
Balls bowled	50
Wickets	1
Bowling average	47.00
5 wickets in innings	–
10 wickets in match	–
Best bowling	1/32
Catches/stumpings	3/–
- Source: Cricinfo, 14 November 2010

Paul Green (born 1 June 1976) is a former English cricketer. Green was a right-handed batsman who bowled right-arm medium pace. He was born at Salford, Greater Manchester.

Green represented the Lancashire Cricket Board in List A cricket. His debut List A match came against the Netherlands in the 1999 NatWest Trophy. From 1999 to 2002, he represented the Board in 5 List A matches, the last of which came against Scotland in the 2nd round of the 2003 Cheltenham & Gloucester Trophy which was played in 2002. In his 6 List A matches, he scored 107 runs at a batting average of 21.40, with a single half century high score of 63. In the field he took 3 catches. With the ball he took a single wicket at a bowling average of 47.00, with best figures of 1/32.
