= David White (English cricketer) =

English cricketer

Personal information
- Full name: David Geoffrey White
- Born: 5 August 1967 (age 59); Horwich, Lancashire, England
- Batting: Right-handed
- Bowling: Right-arm medium-fast

Domestic team information
- Years: Team
- 1999: Lancashire Cricket Board

Career statistics
| Competition | LA |
|---|---|
| Matches | 1 |
| Runs scored | 1 |
| Batting average | 1.00 |
| 100s/50s | –/– |
| Top score | 1 |
| Balls bowled | 18 |
| Wickets | – |
| Bowling average | – |
| 5 wickets in innings | – |
| 10 wickets in match | – |
| Best bowling | – |
| Catches/stumpings | –/– |
- Source: Cricinfo, 14 November 2010

David Geoffrey White (born 5 August 1967) is a former English cricketer. White was a right-handed batsman who bowled right-arm medium-fast. He was born at Horwich, Lancashire.

White represented the Lancashire Cricket Board in a single List A match against the Netherlands in the 1999 NatWest Trophy. In his only List A match, he scored 1 run and with the ball he bowled 3 wicket-less overs.
