= Oddie =

People with the surname Oddie include:

- Bill Oddie (1941–2026), broadcaster, entertainer and ornithologist
- Henry Oddie (1815–1869), English lawyer, landowner and cricketer
- Lily Oddie (1937–2021), Canadian politician from Ontario
- Tasker Oddie (1870–1950), American politician from Nevada

== See also ==
- Oddi (surname)
- Oddy
