= Graham Knowles =

English cricketer

Personal information
- Full name: Graham Andrew Knowles
- Born: 29 August 1973 (age 53); Haslingden, Lancashire, England
- Batting: Right-handed

Domestic team information
- Years: Team
- 2000–2002: Lancashire Cricket Board

Career statistics
Competition	LA
Matches	6
Runs scored	126
Batting average	21.00
100s/50s	–/–
Top score	33
Balls bowled	–
Wickets	–
Bowling average	–
5 wickets in innings	–
10 wickets in match	–
Best bowling	–
Catches/stumpings	3/–
- Source: Cricinfo, 14 November 2010

Graham Andrew Knowles (born 29 August 1973) is an English cricketer. Knowles is a right-handed batsman. He was born in Haslingden, Lancashire.

Knowles represented the Lancashire Cricket Board in List A cricket. His debut List A match came against the Suffolk in the 2000 NatWest Trophy. From 2000 to 2002, he represented the Board in 6 List A matches, the last of which came against Scotland in the 2nd round of the 2003 Cheltenham & Gloucester Trophy which was played in 2002. In his 6 List A matches, he scored 126 runs at a batting average of 21.00, with a high score of 33. In the field he took 3 catches.

He currently plays for and captains, Haslingden Cricket Club in the Lancashire League (cricket) and has over 17,000 league runs.
