= David Heyes (cricketer) =

English cricketer

Personal information
- Full name: David John Heyes
- Born: 7 February 1967 (age 59); Prescot, Lancashire, England
- Batting: Right-handed
- Bowling: Right-arm medium

Domestic team information
- Years: Team
- 2003: Cumberland
- 1999–2000: Lancashire Cricket Board

Career statistics
Competition	LA
Matches	3
Runs scored	41
Batting average	13.66
100s/50s	–/–
Top score	27
Balls bowled	–
Wickets	–
Bowling average	–
5 wickets in innings	–
10 wickets in match	–
Best bowling	–
Catches/stumpings	1/–
- Source: Cricinfo, 14 November 2010

David John Heyes (born 7 February 1967) is a former English cricketer. Heyes was a right-handed batsman who bowled right-arm medium pace. He was born at Prescot, Lancashire.

Heyes represented the Lancashire Cricket Board in 3 List A matches. These came against the Netherlands in the 1999 NatWest Trophy and Suffolk and the Essex Cricket Board in the 2000 NatWest Trophy. In his 3 List A matches, he scored 41 runs at a batting average of 13.66, with a high score of 27. In the field he took a single catch.

In 2003, he played a single Minor Counties Championship match for Cumberland against Hertfordshire.
