= Stuart Catterall =

English cricketer

Personal information
- Full name: Stuart Colin Catterall
- Born: 9 April 1975 (age 51); Southampton, Hampshire, England
- Batting: Right-handed
- Bowling: Right-arm off break

Domestic team information
- Years: Team
- 2000–2002: Lancashire Cricket Board

Career statistics
Competition	LA
Matches	4
Runs scored	64
Batting average	32.00
100s/50s	–/–
Top score	37*
Balls bowled	108
Wickets	1
Bowling average	73.00
5 wickets in innings	–
10 wickets in match	–
Best bowling	1/34
Catches/stumpings	–/–
- Source: Cricinfo, 14 November 2010

Stuart Colin Catterall (born 9 April 1975) is a former English cricketer. Catterall was a right-handed batsman who bowled right-arm off break. He was born at Southampton, Hampshire.

Catterall represented the Lancashire Cricket Board in List A cricket. His debut List A match came against the Essex Cricket Board in the 2000 NatWest Trophy. From 2000 to 2002, he represented the Board in 4 List A matches, the last of which came against Scotland in the 2nd round of the 2003 Cheltenham & Gloucester Trophy which was played in 2002. In his 4 List A matches, he scored 64 runs at a batting average of 32.00, with a high score of 37*. With the ball he took a single wicket at a bowling average of 73.00, with best figures of 1/34.
