= Mark Harvey (cricketer) =

English cricketer

Personal information
- Full name: Mark Edward Harvey
- Born: 26 June 1974 (age 52); Burnley, Lancashire, England
- Batting: Right-handed
- Bowling: Right-arm medium
- Role: Occasional wicket-keeper

Domestic team information
- Years: Team
- 2001: Berkshire
- 1994–1999: Lancashire

Career statistics
Competition	First-class	List A
Matches	7	9
Runs scored	155	157
Batting average	15.50	19.62
100s/50s	–/–	–/1
Top score	39	86
Catches/stumpings	3/–	2/–
- Source: Cricinfo, 11 June 2012

Mark Edward Harvey (born 26 June 1974) is a former English cricketer. Harvey was a right-handed batsman. He was born at Burnley, Lancashire.

In February 1993, Harvey made two appearances for England Under-19s against India Under-19s. He later made his first-class debut for Lancashire against Gloucestershire at Old Trafford in the 1994 County Championship. He made a further first-class appearance in that season against Nottinghamshire in at Trent Bridge. While attending university in 1995, he made a first-class appearance for the Combined Universities against the touring West Indians at the University Parks. It was also in 1995 that he made his List A debut for the Combined Universities in the Benson & Hedges Cup against Gloucestershire. He made a further List A appearance for the team in that season's competition against Middlesex. In 1996, the team changed its name to British Universities, with Harvey making two List A appearances for the renamed team in the 1996 Benson & Hedges Cup against Kent and Glamorgan.

Following university, he returned to Lancashire, where he found opportunities limited over the coming seasons. He made four further first-class appearances for the county, the last of which came against Cambridge University. In total, he made six first-class appearances for Lancashire, scoring 132 runs at an average of 14.66, with a high score of 39. He played his first List A match for Lancashire in 1997 against Northamptonshire. He made four further List A appearances for the county, the last of which came against Gloucestershire in the 1999 CGU National League. He scored a total of 148 runs in his five matches in that format for Lancashire, which came at an average of 37.00, with a high score of 86. This score came against Berkshire in the 1997 NatWest Trophy. After he left Lancashire following the 2000 season, Harvey later played for Berkshire in the 2001 MCCA Knockout Trophy against the Channel Islands at Grainville Cricket Ground.

His brother, Jonathon Harvey, played List A cricket.
