= David Snellgrove (cricketer) =

English cricketer

Personal information
- Full name: David Roy Snellgrove
- Born: 23 August 1967 (age 59); Liverpool, Lancashire, England
- Batting: Right-handed
- Bowling: Right-arm off break
- Relatives: Ken Snellgrove (father)

Domestic team information
- Years: Team
- 2000–2002: Lancashire Cricket Board

Career statistics
Competition	LA
Matches	5
Runs scored	33
Batting average	6.60
100s/50s	–/–
Top score	18
Balls bowled	130
Wickets	5
Bowling average	18.60
5 wickets in innings	–
10 wickets in match	–
Best bowling	2/23
Catches/stumpings	–/–
- Source: Cricinfo, 14 November 2010

David Roy Snellgrove (born 23 August 1967) is an English cricketer. Snellgrove is a right-handed batsman who bowls right-arm off break. He was born in Liverpool, Lancashire.

Snellgrove represented the Lancashire Cricket Board in List A cricket. His debut List A match came against the Netherlands in the 1999 NatWest Trophy. From 1999 to 2002, he represented the Board in 5 List A matches, the last of which came against Scotland in the 2nd round of the 2003 Cheltenham & Gloucester Trophy which was played in 2002. In his 5 List A matches, he scored 33 runs at a batting average of 6.60, with a high score of 18. With the ball he took 5 wickets at a bowling average of 18.60, with best figures of 3/23.

He currently plays club cricket for Southport and Birkdale Cricket Club, in the Premier Division of the Liverpool and District Cricket Competition. In February 2020, he was named in England's squad for the Over-50s Cricket World Cup in South Africa. However, the tournament was cancelled during the third round of matches due to the coronavirus pandemic.

== Family ==
His father, Ken, played first-class cricket for Lancashire and the combined Minor Counties team.
