= John Armstrong (cricketer) =

English cricketer

Personal information
- Full name: John Matthew Armstrong
- Born: 3 January 1981 (age 45); Consett, County Durham, England
- Batting: Left-handed
- Bowling: Leg break googly

Domestic team information
- Years: Team
- 2002: Lancashire Cricket Board

Career statistics
Competition	LA
Matches	2
Runs scored	1
Batting average	0.50
100s/50s	–/–
Top score	1
Balls bowled	–
Wickets	–
Bowling average	–
5 wickets in innings	–
10 wickets in match	–
Best bowling	–
Catches/stumpings	–/–
- Source: Cricinfo, 14 November 2010

John Matthew Armstrong (born 3 January 1981) is an English first-class cricketer. Armstrong is a left-handed batsman who bowls leg break googly. He was born at Consett, County Durham.

Armstrong represented the Lancashire Cricket Board in 2 List A matches against Oxfordshire and Scotland in the 1st and 2nd rounds of the 2003 Cheltenham & Gloucester Trophy which was held in 2002. In his 2 List A matches, he scored 1 run at a batting average of 0.50.
