= Oddi (surname) =

Oddi is an Italian surname. Notable people with the name include:

- Oddi Helgason (c.1070/80 – c. 1140/50), Icelandic farm laborer and astronomer
- Angelo Oddi, Canadian songwriter and composer
- Ettore Arrigoni degli Oddi (1867–1942), Italian Count and ornithologist
- Emidio Oddi, Italian footballer
- Giacomo Oddi (1679–1770), Italian archbishop and cardinal
- Giuseppe Oddi (1839–1919), Italian Catholic Franciscan religious
- Mauro Oddi (1639–c.1702), Italian painter
- Muzio Oddi (1569–1639), Italian mathematician and Gnomonist
- Ruggero Oddi, Italian physiologist
- Silvio Oddi, Italian cardinal and diplomat

== See also ==
- Oddie (surname)
- Oddy (surname)
