= Duncan Whalley =

English cricketer

Personal information
- Full name: Robert Duncan Whalley
- Born: 17 October 1979 (age 47); Blackburn, Lancashire, England
- Batting: Right-handed
- Role: Wicketkeeper

Domestic team information
- Years: Team
- 2001: Lancashire Cricket Board

Career statistics
| Competition | LA |
|---|---|
| Matches | 1 |
| Runs scored | 5 |
| Batting average | 5.00 |
| 100s/50s | –/– |
| Top score | 5 |
| Balls bowled | – |
| Wickets | – |
| Bowling average | – |
| 5 wickets in innings | – |
| 10 wickets in match | – |
| Best bowling | – |
| Catches/stumpings | 1/– |
- Source: Cricinfo, 14 November 2010

Robert Duncan Whalley (born 17 October 1979) is an English cricketer. Whalley is a right-handed batsman who plays primarily as a wicketkeeper. He was born at Blackburn, Lancashire.

Whalley represented the Lancashire Cricket Board in a single List A match against Cheshire in the 1st round of the 2002 Cheltenham & Gloucester Trophy which was held in 2001. In his only List A match he scored 5 runs, while behind the stumps he took a single catch.

He currently plays club cricket for St Annes Cricket Club in the Northern Premier Cricket League.
