= Murder of Jessica Keen =

American murder victim (1975–1991)

- Born: Jessica Lyn Keen; September 24, 1975; Columbus, Ohio, US
- Died: March 16, 1991 (aged 15); West Jefferson, Ohio, US

Jessica Lyn Keen (September 24, 1975 – March 16, 1991) was an American murder victim, killed in Foster Chapel Cemetery in West Jefferson, Ohio. Her case was profiled on the television programs Unsolved Mysteries, On the Case with Paula Zahn and Dead Silent on Investigation Discovery.

== Early life ==
Jessica Lyn Keen, a 15-year-old girl from Columbus, Ohio, was an honor student and cheerleader. However, she quit cheerleading and her grades dropped after meeting and falling in love with 18-year-old Shawn Thompson, a boy at her school. Her parents objected to her seeing the young man, but did not know what to do.

On March 4, 1991, they sought help at a free counselling centre in Columbus and subsequently checked Jessica into Huckleberry House, a facility for troubled teens which offered temporary residence for two weeks along with individual and family counselling sessions. She went missing on 15 March 1991 after saying she was going shopping.

== Body discovered ==
After being missing for two days, Keen was found dead in the early morning hours of March 17 at the back of Foster Chapel Cemetery, 20 miles from the teen facility. She had been raped and badly beaten. She was still wearing her ring and watch, but a gold pendant with the word "Taken" that her boyfriend gave her was nowhere to be found.

Her boyfriend Shawn was the prime suspect, but DNA tests proved he was not responsible. Police theorized that she had escaped her abductors and ran to the cemetery. Evidence in the cemetery shows she tried to hide behind grave stones, a pair of her socks was found, and a knee imprint in the mud behind a grave stone was found near the socks. She was killed near a fence in the cemetery, presumably by her abductors, who had followed her.

Her family has since placed a cross with her name on it where her body was discovered near the fence in the cemetery.

== Arrest ==
On 28 March 2008 police arrested 51 year old Marvin Lee Smith Jr., after DNA evidence found at the crime scene was resubmitted. Smith was charged with unlawful sexual conduct on Keen, a felony, and was extradited to Ohio to face charges.

In 2009, Smith pleaded guilty to first degree murder in a Madison County courtroom, confirming he had raped and murdered Keen. Smith admitted he abducted Keen from a bus stop near the counselling centre she was staying at on 15 March 1991. Evidence showed Keen had escaped his car and run into Foster Chapel Cemetery, where she collided with a fence post and fell. Smith beat Keen to death with a tombstone. He then discarded it over a nearby fence.

In exchange for his admission of guilt, Smith avoided a death penalty trial that was set for March 2009. He pleaded guilty to one charge of aggravated murder, with specifications of rape and kidnapping, and was sentenced to 30 years to life in prison.

== See also ==
- List of kidnappings
- List of solved missing person cases
