= Mark Lomas (cricketer) =

English cricketer (born 1970)

Personal information
- Full name: Mark Christopher Lomas
- Born: 14 May 1970 (age 56); Blackburn, Lancashire, England
- Height: 6 ft 0 in (1.83 m)
- Batting: Right-handed

Domestic team information
- Years: Team
- 1999–2001: Lancashire Cricket Board

Career statistics
Competition	LA
Matches	17
Runs scored	15
Batting average	5.66
100s/50s	–/–
Top score	20
Balls bowled	–
Wickets	–
Bowling average	–
5 wickets in innings	–
10 wickets in match	–
Best bowling	–
Catches/stumpings	1/–
- Source: Cricinfo, 14 November 2010

Mark Christopher Lomas (born 14 May 1970) is an English cricketer. Lomas is a right-handed batsman. He was born at Blackburn, Lancashire.

Lomas represented the Lancashire Cricket Board in 3 List A matches. These came against the Netherlands in the 1999 NatWest Trophy, the Yorkshire Cricket Board in the 2001 Cheltenham & Gloucester Trophy and Cheshire in the 1st round of the 2002 Cheltenham & Gloucester Trophy which was held in 2002. In his total of 3 List A matches, he scored 17 runs at a batting average of 5.66, with a high score of 15. In the field he took a single catch. He also represented Lancashire CCC 2nd XI in 3 matches.

He represented 4 major league teams in 3 leagues

East Lancashire CC in The Lancashire league scoring 9463 runs in 448 matches and taking 290 catches the 2nd highest ever in the leagues history. Blackpool and Morecambe CC both in the Northern league scoring 4142 runs in 145 innings Blackburn Northern as Professional scoring 1026 runs in the 1999 season

His list of trophies include Lancashire league winner 1990, runner up 1988,89,96,97 and 98 Woresley cup winner 1987,88 and 98 Interleague cup 2004 Northern league winner 2006 Northern league cup winner 2009

He also played over 100 matches for the Marylebone Cricket Club

He retired in 2017 finishing is career at his boyhood club East Lancashire Cricket Club in the Lancashire League.
