= David Bruce Morton =

American serial killer and rapist (born 1959)

- Born: May 14, 1959 (age 67); Oklahoma, U.S.
- Conviction: Murder (3 counts)
- Penalty: Life imprisonment

Details
- Victims: 3–8+
- Span of crimes: 1983–1990
- Country: United States
- States: New Mexico, Texas

David Bruce Morton (born May 14, 1959) is an American serial killer and rapist who murdered at least three women in New Mexico and Texas between 1983 and 1990. Arrested shortly after the final murder, Morton confessed to his previous crimes when confronted with the evidence and is now serving two different life sentences in both states.

== Early life ==
Morton was born in Texas in 1959. He and his two siblings were taken from their parents by CPS when he was five years old. He was separated from his siblings almost immediately, never to see his family again. He was not adopted for three years due to the mental stress caused by the abandonment. His criminal escapades began at age 16 when he robbed a store in his neighborhood, and he was convicted of armed robbery. While being housed at a prison treatment facility, he managed to escape, but was recaptured. After his release, he moved to New Mexico, where in 1979 he committed a string of armed robberies, for which he was sentenced to five years in prison.

== Murders ==
=== Janet Benoit ===
A 1978 Bradley-Bourbonnais Community High School graduate, 22-year-old Janet Benoit, headed towards Phoenix, Arizona from Arvada, Colorado in November 1983. During her trip, she decided to make a stop in Santa Fe, New Mexico, making her way to the Comfort Inn. A female housekeeper later discovered Benoit's body when she went into the room to do mandatory cleaning and saw Benoit lying face down with her head hanging off the end of the bed.

Dave Benoit, Janet's older brother, questioned how someone would gain access to her room. In a private investigation, he discovered that nearly one-third of the keys issued to guests were master keys, meaning anyone with one would have access to every motel room. As a result of this, Dave sued Comfort Inn for that practice, and the case was settled out of court.

=== Teri Mulvaney ===
On June 28, 1984, 25-year-old Teri Lynn Mulvaney, a secretary at the Public Service Company of New Mexico, was raped and strangled in her apartment. When investigating suspects, police came across Morton, who was Mulvaney's neighbor. Morton was eventually arrested for drunk-driving, and his cellmate came forward to police saying that Morton had confessed to killing her. Despite this, prosecutors stated there was not enough evidence to charge Morton.

Mulvaney's parents began a letter writing campaign to indict Morton under a grand jury. Eventually, enough signatures were submitted to bring Morton to trial in 1988. District Attorney Chet Walter spoke publicly and during the trial that there was not enough evidence to bring the case to court. In October 1988, the jury could not make a decision, with eleven jurors wanting to acquit while one other insisted on finding Morton guilty. In the end, the case was dismissed.

=== Kim Kendall ===
Soon after being released, Morton left Santa Fe and moved to Amarillo, Texas. There, on May 4, 1990, Morton raped and murdered 22-year-old Kimberly "Kim" Kendall (né Call), a secretary and college student who lived near him. Her husband discovered the body, and Morton was arrested. He was convicted and sentenced to life imprisonment, and would not be linked to the other cases until years later.

== Suspected victims ==
Santa Fe police were made aware of Morton in 1996 due to similarities between the way Kendall and Benoit were killed; both women had stab wounds to the back and neck. In 2003, Morton confessed to killing Benoit as well as Mulvaney, to which he subsequently pled guilty to in court.

In addition, Morton is suspected of killing numerous other young women in Santa Fe. These include;

- Teal Pittington, 18; killed in August 1984. Her body was found in a culvert near Lamy in March 1985, after she had gone missing in August 1984. Due the decomposed state of the body, she had to be identified through dental records.
- Maria Padilla, 29; killed in May 1985. Her body was found in the bosque along the Rio Grande in Albuquerque's South Valley. She was determined to have been raped, and semen was located on her body.
- Susan LaPorte, 25; killed in December 1985. A Boston native, LaPorte visited Santa Fe to visit a friend. A patrol officer found her body beneath a juniper tree, bound with a rope that was knotted around her neck, and ran down to her wrists. In 2009, a retired FBI agent who was then working for the Bernalillo County Sheriff's Department cold case squad discovered a DNA match with a semen sample from the Padilla case. While it was a breakthrough, no suspects were ever arrested in connection with either case.
- Roberta Michelle Montoya, 20; killed in July 1986. After losing custody of her son in California, Montoya moved to Santa Fe, where she found work as a waitress in Clines Corners. She was last seen by friends on Independence Day (July 4) at a hospital. In April 1987, a man walking his dog along Old Las Vegas Highway came across the skeletal remains of a woman. Investigators could never determine how the woman died, but it was assumed to have been a homicide after she was identified as Montoya.
- Michelle Quintana, 23; A real estate worker, Quintana disappeared in August 1987. Her truck was found at the DeVargas Center mall. Two witnesses reportedly saw her get into a red Jeep with two men. While she was never found, it can be assumed that she had been murdered.

== See also ==
- List of serial killers in the United States
