= Steven Oddy =

English cricketer

Personal information
- Full name: Steven Craig Oddy
- Born: 17 May 1979 (age 47); Rochdale, Greater Manchester, England
- Batting: Right-handed
- Bowling: Right-arm medium

Domestic team information
- Years: Team
- 2001: Lancashire Cricket Board

Career statistics
Competition	LA
Matches	2
Runs scored	3
Batting average	1.50
100s/50s	–/–
Top score	3
Balls bowled	90
Wickets	2
Bowling average	23.00
5 wickets in innings	–
10 wickets in match	–
Best bowling	2/27
Catches/stumpings	–/–
- Source: Cricinfo, 14 November 2010

Steven Craig Oddy (born 17 May 1979) is an English cricketer. Oddy is a right-handed batsman who bowls right-arm medium pace. He was born at Rochdale, Greater Manchester.

Oddy represented the Lancashire Cricket Board in 2 List A matches against the Yorkshire Cricket Board in the 2001 Cheltenham & Gloucester Trophy and Cheshire the 1st of the 2002 Cheltenham & Gloucester Trophy which was held in 2001. In his 2 List A matches, he scored 3 runs at a batting average of 1.50, with a high score of 3. With the ball he took 2 wickets at a bowling average of 23.00, with best figures of 2/27.

As of 2010 he plays club cricket for Flowery Field Cricket Club. In 2013 Steve joined Denton West Cricket Club as professional and the team were crowned Lancashire County League champions at the end of the season. Steve is professional at Denton West Cricket Club in 2014.
