= Edwin Snelgrove =

American double-murderer

Edwin "Ned" Snelgrove (born Edwin Fales Snelgrove, Jr.; August 9, 1960) is an American double-murderer who is currently serving a 60-year sentence for the murder of a Hartford, Connecticut woman, Carmen Rodriguez. He was also previously convicted of the 1983 killing of his former girlfriend Karen Osmun and the 1987 attack on Mary Ellen Renard. Snelgrove is incarcerated at the Cheshire Correctional Institution in Cheshire, Connecticut. He is scheduled for release October 14, 2063, when he will be 103 years old.

== Murder of Karen Osmun ==
In 1983, the 23-year-old Snelgrove had previously been dating Karen Osmun from New Brunswick, New Jersey, also 23. Karen was a graduate student at Rutgers University, studying computers. On December 24, 1983, Karen was reported missing by her parents after she failed to show up at their home for dinner in Bricktown, New Jersey. The next day, her body was found in her apartment on her bedroom floor. She had been stabbed with a knife several times to death. She was also strangled. Karen's ex-boyfriend, Ned Snelgrove, was the prime suspect in her murder, but was not charged until several years later, after attacking another New Jersey woman. In 1988, Snelgrove wrote "I could not stop my hands from squeezing her throat as hard as I could" about killing Karen Osmun.

== Attack on Mary Ellen Renard ==
In August 1987, Snelgrove encountered a 44-year-old divorcee named Mary Ellen Renard at a New Jersey nightclub. Snelgrove and Mary Ellen conversed over the course of the night. Snelgrove had told Mary Ellen that he was a recent Rutgers graduate working at HP. At the end of the night, when Mary Ellen was preparing to leave, her car would not start. Snelgrove helped her get her car started, and offered to follow her home to make sure she arrived there safely. When they got back to Mary Ellen's Elmwood Park, New Jersey apartment, Snelgrove asked to use her bathroom, so she let him in. After getting into Mary Ellen's apartment, Snelgrove sexually assaulted and stabbed her several times. Mary Ellen fought back and was able to get into the apartment below her, whose owner called the police. Mary Ellen survived the attack, and was able to identify Snelgrove as her attacker. He was later apprehended and charged. Snelgrove wrote the following in a 1992 letter about the assault on Mary Ellen Renard: "I botched it up. She didn't die. If she had died, my name wouldn't have even made the suspect list".

== Prison ==
In 1988, Snelgrove was to stand trial for the attack on Mary Ellen Renard. Instead of going to trial Snelgrove pleaded guilty to assaulting Mary Ellen Renard and to murdering Karen Osmun. He was convicted of aggravated manslaughter, aggravated criminal sexual contact, and criminal attempted homicide. On June 24, 1988, he was sentenced to 20 years in prison. During his incarceration, he wrote many letters to a former classmate George Recck. He had compared himself to serial killer Ted Bundy and mused how he should emulate Bundy's practice of choosing victims far from his home. After serving 10 years and 11 months, Snelgrove was released from prison on May 26, 1999 for good behavior. Prosecutors repeatedly claimed to have objected to Snelgrove's early release from prison, yet the New Jersey Department of Corrections reviewed Snelgrove's records and determined he was eligible for early release based on time served and good behavior.

== Murder of Carmen Rodriguez ==
After Snelgrove's 1999 release from prison, he moved to Connecticut with his parents. However, prison proved not to rehabilitate Snelgrove. He was later linked to the September 2001 disappearance of 32-year-old Carmen Rodriguez. Rodriguez was last seen alive leaving a bar with Snelgrove in Hartford, Connecticut. Rodriquez's body was found January 6, 2002 in Hopkinton, Rhode Island. Her body was hog-tied in 11 trash bags, and was not identified until police recognized her tattoo. Snelgrove was charged with Rodriguez's murder in October 2003, and the case went to trial in 2005. The trial judge, Carmen Espinosa, permitted evidence of Snelgrove's prison letters and past convictions at his murder trial, and combined with the circumstantial evidence, Snelgrove was convicted of the murder of Rodriguez.

== Aftermath ==
On April 15, 2005, Snelgrove was sentenced to life in prison, which is defined by state law as a term of 60 years.

Snelgrove filed an appeal, claiming that his past criminal history should not have been introduced at his 2005 murder trial. In September 2008, the Connecticut Supreme Court affirmed Snelgrove's convictions.

The case has been profiled on the Oxygen Network series Captured and the Investigation Discovery series On the Case with Paula Zahn. In both programs, Mary Ellen Renard provides statements about her horrifying ordeal with Snelgrove.
