= Matthew Parkinson =

English cricketer

Personal information
- Full name: Matthew Edgar Parkinson
- Born: 14 September 1972 (age 54); Lancaster, Lancashire, England
- Batting: Right-handed
- Bowling: Right-arm medium

Domestic team information
- Years: Team
- 1996–1997; 2000: Cambridgeshire
- 1999: Lancashire Cricket Board

Career statistics
Competition	LA
Matches	2
Runs scored	25
Batting average	25.00
100s/50s	0/0
Top score	20
Balls bowled	24
Wickets	0
Bowling average	–
5 wickets in innings	–
10 wickets in match	–
Best bowling	–
Catches/stumpings	0/–
- Source: Cricinfo, 14 November 2010

Matthew Edgar Parkinson (born 14 September 1972) is a former English cricketer. Parkinson was a right-handed batsman who bowled right-arm medium pace. He was born at Lancaster, Lancashire.

Parkinson made his Minor Counties Championship debut for Cambridgeshire against Cumberland in 1996. The following season he made his second and final Championship appearance for the county against Staffordshire.

In 1999, he made his debut in List A cricket for the Lancashire Cricket Board against the Netherlands in the 1999 NatWest Trophy, in what would be his only List A appearance for the side.

In 2000, he moved back south to play a single List A match for Cambridgeshire against Hertfordshire in the 2000 NatWest Trophy. In his two List A matches, he scored 25 runs at a batting average of 25.00, with a high score of 20.
