= Phil Unsworth =

English cricketer

Personal information
- Full name: Philip Nigel Unsworth
- Born: 7 July 1963 (age 63); Wigan, Lancashire, England
- Batting: Right-handed
- Bowling: Slow left-arm orthodox, left-arm medium

Domestic team information
- Years: Team
- 2001: Lancashire Cricket Board

Career statistics
| Competition | LA |
|---|---|
| Matches | 1 |
| Runs scored | 6 |
| Batting average | 6.00 |
| 100s/50s | –/– |
| Top score | 6 |
| Balls bowled | 60 |
| Wickets | 1 |
| Bowling average | 34.00 |
| 5 wickets in innings | – |
| 10 wickets in match | – |
| Best bowling | 1/34 |
| Catches/stumpings | 1/– |
- Source: Cricinfo, 14 November 2010

Philip 'Phil' Nigel Unsworth (born 7 July 1963) is a former English cricketer. Unsworth was a right-handed batsman who bowled both slow left-arm orthodox and left-arm medium pace. He was born in Wigan, Lancashire.

Unsworth represented the Lancashire Cricket Board in a single List A match against the Yorkshire Cricket Board in the 2001 Cheltenham & Gloucester Trophy. In his only List A match, he scored 6 runs and took a single catch in the field. With the ball he took a single wickets at a cost of 34 runs.
