= Russell Everitt =

English cricketer

Personal information
- Born: September 8, 1881
- Died: May 11, 1973 (aged 91)
- Batting: Right-handed

Career statistics
Competition	First-class
Matches	4
Runs scored	63
Batting average	10.50
100s/50s	0/0
Top score	38
Catches/stumpings	3/0
- Source: Cricinfo, 7 November 2022

Russell Stanley Everitt (8 September 1881 – 11 May 1973) was an English first-class cricketer, who played in four matches: one for Worcestershire in 1901, and another three for Warwickshire in 1909.

Born in King's Heath, Birmingham, Everitt was educated at Malvern College, but did not get into the cricket XI. He made his debut for Worcestershire against Cambridge University in late May 1901; he made 0 and 6 not out. It was to be eight years until Everitt played first-class cricket again, although he played club cricket for Moseley in the Birmingham League, as well as for Richmond in Surrey.

In 1909 Everitt played thrice for Warwickshire, and in the first of these matches, against Surrey, he acted as captain in the absence of Alfred Glover. This was also Everitt's most successful performance: he made his highest score of 38 in the second innings, sharing in a seventh-wicket partnership of around 100 with Sep Kinneir.

Everitt died aged 91 at Kew Gardens, Surrey.
