= John Brown Hamilton =

Scottish Victoria Cross recipient (1896-1973)

- Born: 26 August 1896; Dumbarton, West Dunbartonshire
- Died: 18 July 1973 (aged 76); East Kilbride, South Lanarkshire
- Military career
- Allegiance: United Kingdom
- Branch: British Army
- Units: Highland Light Infantry; Royal Pioneer Corps
- Conflicts: World War I World War II
- Awards: Victoria Cross

John Brown Hamilton VC (26 August 1896 – 18 July 1973) was a Scottish recipient of the Victoria Cross, the highest and most prestigious award for gallantry in the face of the enemy that can be awarded to British and Commonwealth forces.

== Victoria Cross ==
He was 21 years old, and a lance-corporal in the 1/9th (Glasgow Highlanders) Battalion, The Highland Light Infantry, British Army during the First World War, and was awarded the Victoria Cross foe his actions during the Battle of Passchendaele:

On 25/26 September 1917 north of the Ypres-Menin Road, Belgium, great difficulty was experienced in keeping the front and support line supplied with small arm ammunition, owing to the intense artillery fire. At a time when this supply had reached a seriously low level, Lance-Corporal Hamilton on several occasions, on his own initiative, carried bandoliers of ammunition through the enemy's belts of fire and then, in full view of their snipers and machine-guns which were lying out in the front of our line at close range, he distributed the ammunition.

== Post war ==
He later achieved the rank of sergeant. Between the two World Wars he remained an active reserve and Territorial Army member. At the outbreak of World War II he was in hospital and missed mobilisation, and so missed his unit being captured at St Valerie in the defence of Dunkirk. He eventually was promoted through the ranks and finished the war a Colonel in charge of an Italian prisoner of war camp in England.

Born and educated in Dumbarton, he had family links to Cambuslang and lived in the town for much of his life (he is commemorated on memorials in both towns). He died at the age of 77.

== The medal ==
His Victoria Cross is displayed at the National War Museum of Scotland, Edinburgh Castle having been delivered there by his daughter and grandson.
