= Kanso Yoshida =

British seaman, born in Japan

- Born: 1895; Japan
- Died: 1973 (aged 77–78); England
- Other name: Paddy Murphy
- Occupations: Seaman, Donkeyman, Naval Officer, Fireman
- Children: 1
- Relatives: Setsuko, Princess Chichibu (Cousin)

Kanso Yoshida (1895–1973, known to his friends as Paddy Murphy) was a Japanese-born British seaman who was related to Japanese Emperor Hirohito by marriage. He was a resident of England for most of his life, specifically in Liverpool from 1938.

== Biography ==
Yoshida was born in Japan, a second cousin of Princess Chichibu (who had herself been born in England) who in turn became a sister-in-law of Hirohito. He came to England in 1912, but why he left Japan is unknown. He was a ship's fireman and donkeyman by trade, and began calling himself Paddy Murphy when he realized that his Japanese name was causing him to be passed over for assignment to ships.

With a barmaid he fathered a daughter, who in turn had a son. The son did not know that Yoshida was his grandfather until later life, though he saw Yoshida frequently and understood that Yoshida "had a soft spot" for him.

Yoshida served in the British merchant navy during both world wars. During World War I, he was on the ship Huntstrick when it was torpedoed off Gibraltar and sank. Badly wounded in the attack, he was left with a large scar on his face. During World War II, his ship was bombed twice but he was not injured.

Yoshida became a naturalized British citizen in 1940, and was therefore not interned by British authorities as an enemy alien when war broke out between Britain and Japan in 1941. According to a 1985 account, "there were no reports that he suffered insult or inconvenience" during the war because of his ancestry (the account adding, "of course, those were more tolerant times"); but a reminiscence by his English grandson says that he was frequently insulted and treated roughly because of his Japanese origin.
