= Progressive Conservative Party of Ontario candidates in the 1990 Ontario provincial election =

The Progressive Conservative Party of Ontario ran a full slate of candidates in the 1990 provincial election, and won 20 out of 130 seats to become the third-largest party in the legislature. Some of the party's candidates have their own biography pages; information about others may be found here.

== Brantford: Dan DiSabatino ==
Daniel M. DiSabatino has a Bachelor of Arts degree in political science from Wilfrid Laurier University (1987) and a Master of Arts in theology from McMaster University (1989). He was twenty-four years old during the 1990 election, was a registered insurance broker and financial planner, and worked with the Pentecostal New Life Assembly Church. He opposed the introduction of Sunday shopping to Ontario.

DiSabatino was later a staffer for Ron Johnson, who was elected as Brantford's Member of Provincial Parliament (MPP) in the 1995 election. He ran for a seat on the Brantford City Council in 1997, but was defeated.

He later served as lead pastor of the Willowdale Pentecostal Church in Toronto.

Electoral record
Election	Division	Party	Votes	%	Place	Winner
1990 provincial	Brantford	Progressive Conservative	3,087	8.46	3/6	Brad Ward, New Democratic Party
1997 Brantford municipal	City Council, Ward One	n/a	892	9.90	7/8	Paul Urbanowicz and John Starkey

== Downsview: Chris Smith ==
Smith was a thirty-four-year-old businessman at the time of the election. His campaign focused on affordable housing, increased private and public daycare, and crime reduction. He received 1,477 votes (6.22%), finishing third against New Democratic Party candidate Anthony Perruzza.

== Hamilton Centre: Graham Snelgrove ==
Snelgrove was fifty years old at the time of the election (Globe and Mail, 7 September 1990). He received 2,116 votes (8.34%), finishing third against New Democratic Party candidate David Christopherson.

== Muskoka–Georgian Bay: Marilyn Rowe ==
Marilyn Rowe served on the Muskoka Board of Education in the 1980s and 1990s and was its chair for a time. She was also president of the Ontario Public School Trustees Association in the mid-1980s. She criticized the Progressive Conservative government of Bill Davis for extending funding to Roman Catholic schools in 1984, arguing that public system would suffer as a result. After the Progressive Conservatives were defeated in the legislature following the 1985 provincial election, Rowe called for a referendum on the funding issue. She also opposed a 1984 Ontario Court of Appeal decision that gave all francophone children the right to learn in French; her argument was that the expense would be too great.

Rowe received 10,504 votes (31.80%) in 1990, finishing second against New Democratic Party candidate Dan Waters.

== York South: Andrew Feldstein ==
Feldstein was a second-year student at Osgoode Hall Law School at the time of the election. He focused his campaign on taxes and the environment, and spoke out against the allowance given to MPPs. He received 2,561 votes (10.26%), finishing third against New Democratic Party leader Bob Rae. Feldstein graduated from Osgoode Hall in 1992, and later established the firm Andrew Feldstein and Associates. His primary focus is family law.
