= Neil Bannister =

English cricketer

Personal information
- Full name: Neil Derek Richard Bannister
- Born: 10 July 1973 (age 53); Leigh, Lancashire, England
- Batting: Right-handed
- Bowling: Right-arm medium

Domestic team information
- Years: Team
- 2000: Lancashire Cricket Board

Career statistics
Competition	List A
Matches	2
Runs scored	66
Batting average	33.00
100s/50s	0/1
Top score	62
Catches/stumpings	0/–
- Source: Cricinfo, 14 November 2010

Neil Derek Richard Bannister (born 10 July 1973) is a former English cricketer. Bannister was a right-handed batsman who bowled right-arm medium pace. He was born in Leigh, Lancashire.

Bannister represented the Lancashire Cricket Board in two List A matches against Suffolk and the Essex Cricket Board in the 2000 NatWest Trophy. In his 2 List A matches, he scored 66 runs at a batting average of 33.00, with a single half century high score of 62.
