= David Allen Lucas =

American serial killer

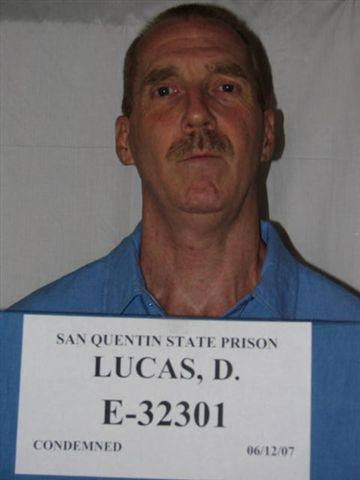
- Born: 1956 (age 69–70); Philippines
- Convictions: First degree murder with special circumstances x3 Kidnapping x2 Attempted murder Rape
- Penalty: Death x3

Details
- Victims: 3–6
- Span of crimes: 1979–1984
- Country: United States
- State: California
- Date apprehended: December 1984
- Imprisoned at: California Health Care Facility, Stockton, California

David Allen Lucas (born 1956) is an American serial killer who committed between three and six murders in San Diego County, California from 1979 to 1984. Due to the fact that all the victims had their throats slashed, the case was dubbed The Throat-Slash Murders.

After one of the most prolonged trials in the city's history, Lucas was found guilty of three of the murders and sentenced to death, and remains on death row.

== Early life ==
Not much is known about the early life of Lucas. Born in 1956 on an American military installation in the Philippines, he was one of three children born to naval officer Clarence Lucas and his wife Patricia Katzenmeier, who moved back to the United States when David was still young. From an early age, David began to experience health problems, being diagnosed with bronchial asthma and nocturnal enuresis. His childhood was fraught by the destructive behavior of his father, who physically and sexually abused his children and spouse. According to the Lucas children's recollections, Clarence would fly into fits of rage and destroy furniture, have frequent arguments with their mother and would frequently beat them with a belt, telephone cable or his bare hands.

David's siblings would later claim that most of this abuse was centered around him, a claim which he would confirm later on in life, stating that his father frequently subjected him to various other forms of humiliation. One such incident included forcing his sister to eat her own vomit after she became nauseous at a family dinner. In 1971, David's parents divorced, after he, his siblings and their mother moved away. Two years later, when he was 18 years old, he was arrested for raping a 21-year-old maid who worked for a family friend and was incarcerated for an unknown amount of time.

After his release, Lucas married a woman named Shannon and moved to Spring Valley, where he opened his own carpet cleaning business with the help of his friend, Frank William Clark.

== Murders ==
=== Suzanne and Colin Jacobs ===
According to investigators, Lucas committed his first murders on May 4, 1979, with his victims being 31-year-old Suzanne Camille Jacobs and her 3-year-old son, Colin, who resided in Normal Heights. On the day of the murder, Suzanne's husband Michael woke up in the morning and went to work, leaving the house at 6:00 AM. Margaret Harris, a neighbor of the family who lived across the street from the Jacobs household, later stated that after Michael left, between 8:00 and 9:00 AM, a dark maroon colored sports car with a black top pulled up to the house. Between approximately 11:00 and 11:30 AM, Harris made a telephone call to Suzanne Jacobs to invite her to go bicycling, which went unanswered. At approximately the same time, Michael called her workplace, but also received no response. At 12:30 AM, a courier named Louis Hoeniger showed up at the Jacobs' home to deliver a dinette set that they had ordered the previous day. Without waiting for them to answer, he left the package on the porch and left.

At about 5:00 PM, Michael Jacobs returned home, and upon entering the house, he discovered the body of his son. Shocked, he ran to the Harrises' house, and after explaining what he had seen, they returned to the Jacobs home, where they found Suzanne's body in the bedroom. After arriving on the scene, police officers found a significant amount of blood in the bathroom and in the hallway. While inspecting the bathroom, officers noticed that the mat had been folded, and that there was a torn piece of paper. There were two things handwritten inside, one saying "Love Insurance" and the other "280–1700".

During the investigation, police determined that the killer had slit Colin's throat in the bathroom, but that the boy did not lose consciousness immediately - he managed to make it to the hallway, where he collapsed on the floor and died. Suzanne, on the other hand, was likely killed in the bedroom, due to the amount of broken furniture and other signs of a struggle. Coroners noted that she fiercely resisted her attacker, as they found large strands of blonde hair in both of her hands, which she likely pulled out of from the killer's hair. Suzanne had been stabbed twice in the back and once in the abdomen, damaging her liver, but was left fully clothed and did not seem to be sexually assaulted. She was killed when the killer slit her throat, leaving splotches of blood on the adjacent furniture, floor, sheets and even the door. While examining the crime scene, law enforcement officers found several bloody footprints on the floor with the distinctive tread of men's shoes with a distinctive sole belonging to the Vibram brand. All the footprints were the same size and had the same pattern, leading investigators to conclude that the killer likely acted alone.

According to forensic pathologist David Katsuyama, the perpetrator slit the victims' throats with such force that he left gaping wounds that exposed their spines. In Katsuyama's opinion, the wounds were inflicted with a medium-length knife with a sharp, relatively stiff blade. On May 11, 1979, laboratory technician Pat Stewart took several photographs of the torn piece of paper and applied ninhydrin, a chemical used to detect partial fingerprints. Three days later, the San Diego Police Department fingerprint examiner Leigh Emmerson examined a partial fingerprint on this piece of paper and found five or six identifiable dots, which he felt were insufficient to determine who the print belonged to, but could be used to eliminate potential suspects.

=== Gayle Garcia ===
On December 8, 1981, the body of 29-year-old realtor Gayle Roberta Garcia was found in a vacant property in Spring Valley, having evidently been killed by having her throat cut. On that day, she had driven to the property intent on showing it to at least three potential renters, one of whom was never identified.

The similarity of her murder led some to believe that she was killed by the same man who had killed the Jacobses and the latter victims.

=== Assault on Jodie Santiago ===
On the evening of June 8, 1984, Lucas, according to investigators, assaulted 34-year-old Jodie Santiago Robertson, a visitor from Seattle, Washington, who was visiting friends in El Cajon. That evening, Santiago left a restaurant sometime between 10:30 and 11:00 PM and walked to her vehicle in the parking lot in order to return to her brother's apartment. At that time, Lucas, whom Santiago would later positively identify as her attacker, approached her from behind, put a knife to her throat and began threatening to kill her. Lucas took her to his dark maroon colored sports car and then drove to his house, where he dragged her to the bedroom, tied her hands behind her back and placed her on the bed.

Lucas then raped the woman and began strangling her until she lost consciousness. After untying the victim, Lucas placed her in his car and then dumped her in some bushes on the side of a road about a kilometer away from his house. Before driving away, Lucas slit her throat. The woman's half-naked body was discovered the following morning by two local women who immediately called the police, after which Santiago was taken to a nearby hospital for treatment, thanks to which she survived.

The extent of the injuries left permanent damage to Santiago's vocal cords, vertebral bones, and left jugular vein, as well as sustaining a severe skull fracture, pieces of skin from her head being scalped and deep cuts to the fingers of her right hands which went through her tendons. Santiago had to undergo several surgeries and was eventually released 18 days later, after which she gave a statement to police, describing her attacker and the exterior of his car. In her testimony, Santiago stated that her attacker drove a car that resembled a Datsun 280ZX with a manual transmission, which had a license plate consisting of three numbers and three letters. She also claimed that the assailant lived in a house that had a semi-circular driveway in front of it.

=== Rhonda Strang and Amber Fisher ===
On August 3, investigators claimed that Lucas again committed a double murder, with his victims being 24-year-old Rhonda Strang and 3-year-old Amber Fisher, whom Rhonda had been babysitting at her home in Lakeside. At the time of her death, Rhonda was married to Robert Strang, a drug addict who was a regular user of drugs such as marijuana, cocaine and methamphetamine. Relatives and acquaintances of the family repeatedly witnessed numerous arguments between the couple after Robert began selling drugs in their house. Lucas' friend and co-worker, Richard Adler, was Rhonda's brother and introduced him to the pair. Lucas was known to have visited the Strangs on numerous occasions to purchase drugs, as several friends and acquaintances of Robert had seen him. According to her family members, Rhonda was constantly depressed and stressed, as she feared what her husband's clients could possibly do - because of this, she kept the doors and windows locked at all times and took steps to verify the identity of anybody who wanted to enter. According to her relatives, shortly before her death, Rhonda had considered divorcing Robert and kept a diary of his financial dealings with both consumers and suppliers.

Robert was eventually apprehended and interrogated but claimed that he was at his workplace when the murders occurred. It was later confirmed by his foreman, William Ralls, who stated that he paid special attention to Strang, as he had a reputation for leaving the worksite without proper authorization - as a result, Robert was dismissed as a suspect and released. After this, investigators considered that Rhonda and Fisher were likely killed by one of Robert's clients or drug suppliers. Detective Dale Kitts said that in the summer of 1984, Rhonda began cooperating with him about her husband's drug business, offering information about his supplier. According to Kitts, Rhonda secretly monitored Robert's activities by keeping her diary, phone records, a list of known drug dealers, customers, and financial transactions. In the weeks before the murders, she repeatedly expressed the belief that she was being watched and was going to be killed because she knew too much. After the murders, authorities searched Strang's house but did not find the diary or any other records naming people involved in Robert's drug business.

=== Anne Swanke ===
According to investigators, Lucas committed his last murder on November 19, killing 22-year-old Anne Catherine Swanke. On that evening, Swanke was visiting her boyfriend, Gregory Oberle, near the San Diego State University campus. Before Swanke left Oberle's apartment between 12:30 and 1:00 AM on November 20, she had mentioned to him that her Dodge Colt had run out of gas.

Later that night, her vehicle stalled midway to her home, whereupon she walked to a gas station near La Mesa, purchased gasoline, and successfully walked back to her car before disappearing. The car was found abandoned in the early morning hours of the following day by police officer Charles Drake. When he approached the car, he found that the driver's door was unlocked and that Swanke's wallet was on one of the car seats. Drake examined the car further, finding the car keys, a flashlight, and a gas tank cap on the driver's side trunk lid of the car. The gas tank itself was open, and the gasoline canister was lying on the ground.

Swanke's body was found four days later in a remote, rocky area approximately two miles away from Lucas' home in Spring Valley. She was naked below her waist, had her throat cut, and a silver lanyard chain used to tether dogs was found around her neck. The top of her clothes had been cut open, exposing her upper torso.

== Arrest ==
Based on various evidence and testimony, Lucas was indicted in late 1984 for the Strang-Fisher and Swanke murders, and the assault on Santiago, who had positively identified him as her attacker after she was shown a photo of him. He was additionally investigated as a suspect in the murder of Gayle Garcia, as it closely resembled the three killings he was charged with. In the meantime, Lucas was sued by Clark, who attempted to dissolve the partnership on claims that he was unable to run the business due to his arrest.

In early 1985, David Lucas was indicted for the murders of Garcia and the Jacobses. Initially, San Diego police had arrested another man for the murders of Suzanne and Colin Jacobs - 30-year-old Johnny Massingale of Harlan, Kentucky, a vagrant who lived in San Diego at the time. Massingale was arrested in March 1984, after which he confessed to killing the Jacobses and spent 10 months in the San Diego County Jail. After establishing Lucas' involvement in the murders, the San Diego County District Attorney's Office dropped all charges against Massingale and was released from custody in January 1985, after which he sued the District Attorney's Office for $3,000,000 in financial compensation. In his claim, Massingale - who was illiterate, did not know how to write and studied only until the fourth grade - said that Denny Pace, an investigator with the Kentucky State Police, had threatened him with the death penalty if he did not confess.

== Trial ==
Because of the large number of murders and the lengthy investigation, by the end of 1985, the criminal cases amounted to several dozen volumes for Lucas and his attorneys to review, so that preliminary hearings did not begin until January 1986. Initially, several trials were scheduled to examine Lucas' involvement in the murders on a case-by-case basis, but the San Diego County District Attorney's Office filed a motion with the court to consolidate all the criminal cases into a single trial, which was granted. Jury selection began in August 1986, after which the trial's opening date was set for early 1987.

=== Defense in the Jacobs case ===
The defense's main explanation was to accuse Johnny Massingale of being the actual killer. To corroborate this, they brought forward Denny Pace, the investigator from Kentucky to whom Massingale had originally confessed. In his testimony, Pace said that had known Massingale's family for years and that he knew he often did drugs and prostituted himself to other men for money. According to him, Massingale admitted that he had met a woman named Suzanne at a bar and that they left together in a taxi, but was unable what happened clearly because he was high on LSD.

When cross-examined, Pace did admit that he had mentioned to Massingale that he could receive the death penalty if convicted, but claimed that he had advised him that if he confessed, the court might go easy on him. Also, whilst he initially denied having shown photographs of the crime scene, he did eventually admit to showing one - that of the Jacobses' bedroom, where Colin was believed to have died. Finally, when asked if he believed that Massingale was a liar who would say anything to satisfy a police officer, he replied in the positive.

Another witness brought forward on the defense's behalf was former Circuit Court Judge Sidney Douglass, who noted that Pace had a good reputation and was a competent police officer who had participated in many bootlegging raids.

== Death sentence and status ==
Ultimately, on June 21, 1989, after eight days of deliberations, a jury found Lucas guilty of committing the murders of the Jacobses and Anne Swanke, as well as kidnapping and assaulting Jodie Santiago. Due to insufficient evidence, he was acquitted of the murder of Gayle Garcia, and was similarly acquitted for the murders of Rhonda Strang and Amber Fisher, as those charged resulted in a hung jury. He showed no emotion during sentencing, but his mother said that she loved him, burst into tears, and ran out of the courtroom and down the hallway.

On September 19, despite passionate pleas from his lawyer and mother, Lucas was sentenced to death for the three murder convictions. The verdict was welcomed by the deceased victims' family members and Jodie Robertson, who felt that the brutality of Lucas' crimes warranted the death penalty. A new trial date was set for the Strang-Fisher murders, but the charges were later dropped on the grounds that he was already sentenced to death.

=== Appeals ===
Since his conviction, Lucas has repeatedly attempted to overturn his convictions, citing errors in the trial and penalty phases. His appeal was denied by the Supreme Court of California in 2014, which concluded that any possible errors were not prejudicial, and he was thus not entitled to a retrial.

As of September 2023, Lucas remains on California's death row.

== See also ==
- Capital punishment in California
- List of death row inmates in the United States § California
- List of serial killers in the United States
