= Ken Snellgrove =

English cricketer

Kenneth Leslie Snellgrove (12 November 1941 – 8 March 2009) was an English cricketer active from 1961 to 1974 who played for Lancashire. He was born in Shepton Mallet, Somerset and died in Ormskirk, Lancashire. He appeared in 106 first-class matches as a righthanded batsman who bowled right arm off break. He scored 3,948 runs with a highest score of 138, one of two first-class centuries, and held 36 catches. He took three wickets with a best analysis of two for 23.
