= 2001 Cheltenham & Gloucester Trophy =

- Administrator: England and Wales Cricket Board
- Cricket format: Limited overs cricket (50 overs per innings)
- Tournament format: Knockout
- Champions: Somerset (3rd title)
- Participants: 56
- Matches: 55
- Most runs: 258 Graeme Hick (Worcestershire)
- Most wickets: 10 Peter Martin (Lancashire)

The 2001 Cheltenham and Gloucester Trophy was an English limited overs county cricket tournament which was held between 1 May and 1 September 2001. It was the first Cheltenham & Gloucester Trophy following its change of name from the NatWest Trophy, with new sponsors Cheltenham & Gloucester plc. The tournament was won by Somerset who defeated Leicestershire by 41 runs in the final at Lord's.

== Format ==
The 18 first-class counties, were joined by all twenty Minor Counties, plus Huntingdonshire. They were also joined by the cricket boards of Derbyshire, Durham, Essex, Gloucestershire, Hampshire, Kent, Lancashire, Leicestershire, Middlesex, Northamptonshire, Nottinghamshire, Somerset, Surrey, Sussex, Warwickshire, Worcestershire and Yorkshire. Unlike previous years, the national teams of Denmark, Ireland, the Netherlands and Scotland were unable to take part due to international commitments in the 2001 ICC Trophy.

The tournament was a knockout with four rounds before the quarter-final and semi-final stages. The winners of the semi-finals went on to the final at Lord's which was held on 1 September 2001.

=== First round ===
1 May 2001
(scorecard)

Nottinghamshire Cricket Board; 210/8 (50 overs)	v	Bedfordshire; 212/7 (49.4 overs)
Andrew Jackman 73; William Sneath 3/44 (10 overs)		David Clarke 93; Jamie Hart 3/36 (9 overs)

Bedfordshire won by 3 wickets
Wardown Park, Luton
Umpires: Keith Coburn & John Ilott
Player of the match: David Clarke (Bedfordshire)

1, 2 May 2001
(scorecard)

Hampshire Cricket Board; 29/2 (10 overs)	v	Kent Cricket Board
Paul Marks 17*; Andy Tutt 2/14 (5 overs)

No result
Mote Park, Maidstone
Umpires: Charlie Puckett & Bob Sutton

- Match was scheduled for one day but extended to two. Kent Cricket Board won on a bowl out.

1 May 2001
(scorecard)

Yorkshire Cricket Board; 160/6 (50 overs)	v	Lancashire Cricket Board; 83 all out (42 overs)
Mark Gilliver 28; Steven Oddy 2/27 (10 overs)		Roland Horridge 20*; Pieter Swanepoel 3/9 (8 overs)

Lancashire Cricket won by 77 runs
Seedhill Ground, Nelson
Umpires: Peter Brown & Mick McLean
Player of the match: Stephen Foster (Yorkshire Cricket Board)

1 May 2001
(scorecard)

Lincolnshire; 223/6 (50 overs)	v	Suffolk; 227/6 (49 overs)
Jason Harrison 71; Gary Kirk 2/16 (10 overs)		Bill Athey 71; David Christmas 2/48 (8 overs)

Suffolk won by 4 wickets
London Road, Sleaford
Umpires: Peter Clubb & John Tythcott
Player of the match: Ian Graham (Suffolk)

1, 2 May 2001
(scorecard)

Middlesex Cricket Board	v	Northumberland

Match abandoned
John Walker's Ground, Southgate
Umpires: Steve Tovey & Ross Wood

- Match was scheduled for one day but extended to two. Middlesex Cricket Board won on bowl out, 5–4

1 May 2001
(scorecard)

Huntingdonshire; 252/5 (50 overs)	v	Oxfordshire; 175 all out (46 overs)
Wayne Larkins 73 (87); Luke List 1/24 (8 overs)		Benjamin Thompson 42 (81); Carl Bradfield 2/17 (3 overs)

Huntingdonshire won by 77 runs
Vicarage Hill, East Challow
Umpires: Alan Bundy & David Burden
Player of the match: Wayne Larkins (Huntingdonshire)

1 May 2001
(scorecard)

Shropshire; 196/8 (50 overs)	v	Devon; 189/7 (50 overs)
Gavin Byram 56; Russell Jones 2/38 (10 overs)		Gareth Townsend 60; Asif Din 2/32 (10 overs)

Shropshire won by 7 runs
London Road, Shrewsbury
Umpires: Bill Smith & Tommy Wilson
Player of the match: Gavin Byram (Shropshire)

1, 2 May 2001
(scorecard)

Wales Minor Counties; 159/8 (50 overs)	v	Somerset Cricket Board; 139 all out (47.1 overs)
Kristian Bell 29; Richard Pannell 3/21 (10 overs)		Michael Coles 29; David Towse 2/13 (10 overs)

Wales Minor Counties won by 20 runs
North Perrott Cricket Club Ground, North Perrott
Umpires: Michael Johnson & Michael Moran
Player of the match: David Towse (Wales Minor Counties)

- Match was scheduled for one day but extended to two.

1 May 2001
(scorecard)

Staffordshire; 78 all out (36.3 overs)	v	Worcestershire Cricket Board; 79/2 (15.4 overs)
Jamie Jervis 19; Jonathan Wright 5/21 (10 overs)		Mark Hodgkiss 48; Greg Willott 1/21 (3 overs)

Worcestershire Cricket Board won by 8 wickets
Porthill Park, Wolstanton
Umpires: Niels Bagh & Wyn Morgan
Player of the match: Mark Hodgkiss (Worcestershire Cricket Board)

1, 2 May 2001
(scorecard)

Derbyshire Cricket Board; 193/5 (50 overs)	v	Wiltshire; 144 all out (46.4 overs)
Jamie Benstead 61; Richard Bates 3/34 (10 overs)		Russell Rowe 40; Ian Parkin 5/24 (10 overs)

Derbyshire Cricket Board won by 49 runs
Hardenhuish Park, Chippenham
Umpires: Steve Bishopp & John Hardy
Player of the match: Jamie Benstead (Derbyshire Cricket Board)

- Match was scheduled for one day but extended to two.

=== Second round ===
15 May 2001
(scorecard)

Derbyshire Cricket Board; 146 all out (46.3 overs)	v	Cambridgeshire; 147/2 (35.1 overs)
Ben Spendlove 55; Ian Blanchett 3/24 (10 overs)		Nadeem Mohammed 54*; George Moulds 1/28 (7 overs)

Cambridgeshire won by 8 wickets
The Avenue Sports Club Ground, March
Umpires: John Ilott & John Tythcott
Player of the match: Nadeem Mohammed (Cambridgeshire)

15, 16 May 2001
(scorecard)

Cheshire; 256/5 (50 overs)	v	Cornwall; 258/7 (49.1 overs)
Andrew Hall 66; Charlie Shreck 2/58 (10 overs)		Tom Sharp 61; Simon Renshaw 2/44 (9.1 overs)

Cornwall won by 3 wickets
Roskear, Camborne
Umpires: Peter Kingston-Davey & Gordon Ripley
Player of the match: Tim Edwards (Cornwall)

- Match was scheduled for one day but extended to two.

15 May 2001
(scorecard)

Dorset; 197/9 (50 overs)	v	Bedfordshire; 199/3 (45 overs)
Matthew Keech 73; Shaun Rashid 3/41 (10 overs)		Shaun Young 78*; Daniel Britton 2/30 (7 overs)

Bedfordshire won by 7 wickets
Dean Park Cricket Ground, Bournemouth
Umpires: Michael Johnson & Cliff Pocock
Player of the match: Shaun Young (Bedfordshire)

15 May 2001
(scorecard)

Gloucestershire Cricket Board; 169/9 (50 overs)	v	Herefordshire; 172/5 (38.3 overs)
Nicholas Stovold 26 (69); Jonathan Shaw 3/49 (9 overs)		Andre Adams 46 (36); Stuart Barnes 1/18 (4 overs)

Herefordshire won by 5 wickets
The Park, Brockhampton
Umpires: John James & Steve Johnson
Player of the match: Andre Adams (Herefordshire)

15 May 2001
(scorecard)

Durham Cricket Board; 172 all out (47.2 overs)	v	Hertfordshire; 172/8 (50 overs)
Allan Worthy 74; Matthew Smith 3/43 (10 overs)		Iain Fletcher 60; Stephen Humble 2/29 (7 overs)

Hertfordshire won by losing fewer wickets
Digswell Park, Welwyn Garden City
Umpires: David Burden & John Reed
Player of the match: Iain Fletcher (Hertfordshire)

15 May 2001
(scorecard)

Buckinghamshire; 221/7 (50 overs)	v	Kent Cricket Board; 222/5 (49.5 overs)
Mark Richardson 62; Damon Trigger 2/35 (10 overs)		James Tredwell 71; Russell Lane 2/48 (7.5 overs)

Kent Cricket Board won by 5 wickets
Mote Park, Maidstone
Umpires: Charlie Puckett & Bob Sutton
Player of the match: James Tredwell (Kent Cricket Board)

15 May 2001
(scorecard)

Middlesex Cricket Board; 218/7 (50 overs)	v	Berkshire; 219/2 (43.1 overs)
Peter Wellings 60; Christopher Batt 2/31 (9 overs)		Tom Fray 87*; Mark Wright 1/13 (4 overs)

Berkshire won by 8 wickets
Old Deer Park, Richmond
Umpires: David Edwards & Paul Joy
Player of the match: Tom Fray (Berkshire)

15 May 2001
(scorecard)

Wales Minor Counties; 186/8 (50 overs)	v	Norfolk; 151 all out (46.3 overs)
Lyndon Jones 38; Carl Rogers 3/26 (7 overs)		Carl Rogers 45; David Towse 2/13 (8.3 overs)

Wales Minor Counties won by 35 runs
Manor Park, Horsford
Umpires: Steve Marszal & Les Redford
Player of the match: Carl Rogers (Norfolk)

15 May 2001
(scorecard)

Northamptonshire Cricket Board; 225/7 (50 overs)	v	Yorkshire Cricket Board; 195/9 (50 overs)
Tim Coleman 82; Richard Wilkinson 2/38 (10 overs)		Mark Gilliver 48; Mark Wolstenholme 5/41 (10 overs)

Northamptonshire Cricket Board won by 30 runs
County Ground, Northampton
Umpires: Keith Coburn & Ross Wood
Player of the match: Tim Coleman (Northamptonshire Cricket Board)

15 May 2001
(scorecard)

Essex Cricket Board; 134 all out (47.2 overs)	v	Suffolk; 135/4 (43.1 overs)
Devang Gandhi 23; Ian Graham 3/26 (8.2 overs)		Dave Callaghan 32; Devang Gandhi 3/19 (10 overs)

Suffolk won by 6 wickets
Wamil Way, Mildenhall
Umpires: Peter Clubb & Robert Eagleton
Player of the match: Dave Callaghan (Suffolk)

15 May 2001
(scorecard)

Surrey Cricket Board; 246/8 (50 overs)	v	Huntingdonshire; 187 all out (46.1 overs)
Zander de Bruyn 113 (127); Lee Peacock 3/65 (10 overs)		James Woodward 30 (71); Zander de Bruyn 2/22 (3 overs)

Surrey Cricket Board won by 59 runs
Cheam Cricket Club Ground, Cheam
Umpires: Alan Price & Martin White
Player of the match: Zander de Bruyn (Surrey Cricket Board)

15 May 2001
(scorecard)

Sussex Cricket Board; 307/4 (50 overs)	v	Shropshire; 271 all out (46.5 overs)
George Campbell 141; Kevin Evans 2/53 (9 overs)		James Ralph 73; Hugo Southwell 3/39 (6 overs)

Sussex Cricket Board won by 36 runs
Horntye Park, Hastings
Umpires: Steve Bishopp & John Hardy
Player of the match: George Campbell (Sussex Cricket Board)

15 May 2001
(scorecard)

Warwickshire Cricket Board; 181 all out (49.4 overs)	v	Leicestershire Cricket Board; 114 all out (44 overs)
Neil Humphrey 58; Neil Pullen 5/41 (10 overs)		Neil Pullen 32; Daniel Dalton 3/16 (7 overs)

Warwickshire Cricket Board won by 67 runs
Bulls Head Ground, Coventry
Umpires: Trevor Riley & Bill Smith
Player of the match: Daniel Dalton (Warwickshire Cricket Board)

15, 16 May 2001
(scorecard)

Cumberland; 111/6 (38.4 overs)	v	Worcestershire Cricket Board
Steve O'Shaughnessy 25*; Jonathan Wright 2/11 (4 overs)

No result
Chester Road North Ground, Kidderminster
Umpires: Paddy O'Hara & Tommy Wilson

- Match was scheduled for one day but extended to two. Cumberland won bowl out, 3–2.

=== Third round ===
27 June 2001
(scorecard)

Bedfordshire; 211/9 (50 overs)	v	Yorkshire; 212/6 (46.3 overs)
Oliver Clayson 34 (66); Ryan Sidebottom 4/39 (10 overs)		Darren Lehmann 88 (98); Shaun Rashid 4/54 (10 overs)

Yorkshire won by 4 wickets
Wardown Park, Luton
Umpires: Peter Clubb & Barry Dudleston
Player of the match: Darren Lehmann (Yorkshire)

27 June 2001
(scorecard)

Essex; 218/9 (50 overs)	v	Berkshire; 149 all out (47.4 overs)
Ronnie Irani 55 (95); Jonathan Moss 3/52 (10 overs)		Julian Wood 54 (97); Ronnie Irani 3/37 (9 overs)

Essex won by 69 runs
Sonning Lane, Reading
Umpires: Alan Bundy & Barrie Leadbeater
Player of the match: Ronnie Irani (Berkshire)

27 June 2001
(scorecard)

Somerset; 271/9 (50 overs)	v	Cambridgeshire; 221 all out (49.1 overs)
Mark Lathwell 101 (103); Danny Wilson 2/35 (4 overs)		Ajaz Akhtar 78 (75); Jamie Grove 4/36 (10 overs)

Somerset won by 50 runs
The Avenue Sports Club Ground, March
Umpires: Trevor Riley & Bob White
Player of the match: Ajaz Akhtar (Cambridgeshire)

27 June 2001
(scorecard)

Sussex; 253/6 (50 overs)	v	Cornwall; 220/8 (50 overs)
Chris Adams 89* (103); Steven Pope 2/44 (10 overs)		James Hands 33 (77); Jason Lewry 3/43 (10 overs)

Sussex won by 33 runs
Boscawen Park, Truro
Umpires: Roy Palmer & Alan Whitehead
Player of the match: Chris Adams (Sussex)

27 June 2001
(scorecard)

Cumberland; 72 all out (33.3 overs)	v	Kent; 74/1 (10.2 overs)
Martin Lewis 21 (33); Ben Trott 5/18 (10 overs)		James Hockley 48* (31); Marcus Sharp 1/24 (4.2 overs)

Kent won by 9 wickets
Ernest Pass Memorial Ground, Barrow-in-Furness
Umpires: John Holder & Ken Shuttleworth
Player of the match: Ben Trott (Kent)

27 June 2001
(scorecard)

Hampshire; 262/5 (50 overs)	v	Durham; 263/3 (40.2 overs)
Neil Johnson 113 (144); Nicholas Hatch 2/51 (10 overs)		Nicky Peng 119 (128); Alan Mullally 2/79 (10 overs)

Durham won by 7 wickets
Riverside Ground, Chester-le-Street
Umpires: Jeff Evans & Allan Jones
Player of the match: Nicky Peng (Durham)

27 June 2001
(scorecard)

Derbyshire; 195/9 (50 overs)	v	Glamorgan; 199/7 (47.2 overs)
Dominic Cork 50 (67); Adrian Dale 3/15 (7 overs)		Mike Powell 39* (79); Dominic Cork 4/35 (10 overs)

Glamorgan won by 3 wickets
Sophia Gardens, Cardiff
Umpires: George Sharp & David Shepherd
Player of the match: Dominic Cork (Derbyshire)

27 June 2001
(scorecard)

Middlesex; 278/6 (50 overs)	v	Herefordshire; 279/7 (49.5 overs)
David Nash 58 (71); Paul Thomas 2/50 (10 overs)		Harshad Patel 68 (100); Ben Hutton 2/42 (6 overs)

Herefordshire won by 3 wickets
Luctonians Cricket Club Ground, Kingsland
Umpires: Vanburn Holder & Bill Smith
Player of the match: Harshad Patel (Herefordshire)

27 June 2001
(scorecard)

Worcestershire; 336/8 (50 overs)	v	Hertfordshire; 69 all out (25.5 overs)
Graeme Hick 155 (113); Paul O'Reilly 2/54 (9 overs)		Matthew Smith 18 (64); Andy Bichel 3/9 (6 overs)

Worcestershire won by 267 runs
Balls Park, Hertford
Umpires: David Constant & Nigel Llong
Player of the match: Graeme Hick (Worcestershire)

27 June 2001
(scorecard)

Kent Cricket Board; 237/2 (50 overs)	v	Warwickshire; 238/3 (39.3 overs)
Paul Lazenbury 88* (93); Vasbert Drakes 1/17 (10 overs)		Dominic Ostler 82* (56); Kevin Masters 1/26 (10 overs)

Warwickshire won by 7 wickets
St Lawrence Ground, Canterbury
Umpires: Paul Adams & Trevor Jesty
Player of the match: Paul Lazenbury (Kent Cricket Board)

21 June 2001
(scorecard)

Warwickshire Cricket Board; 163 all out (47 overs)	v	Lancashire; 165/3 (34.5 overs)
Gavin Shephard 73 (107); Peter Martin 5/16 (9 overs)		Jamie Haynes 59 (109); Naheem Sajjad 2/25 (10 overs)

Lancashire won by 7 wickets
Stanley Park, Blackpool
Umpires: Ray Julian & Kevin Lyons
Player of the match: Gavin Shephard (Warwickshire Cricket Board)

27 June 2001
(scorecard)

Northamptonshire Cricket Board; 277/6 (50 overs)	v	Northamptonshire; 278/1 (41.2 overs)
David Paynter 104 (106); Mike Hussey 1/20 (3 overs)		Mal Loye 124* (122); Martyn Dobson 1/58 (8 overs)

Northamptonshire won by 9 wickets
County Ground, Northampton
Umpires: Mark Benson & Michael Dixon
Player of the match: Mal Loye (Northamptonshire)

27 June 2001
(scorecard)

Suffolk; 87 all out (32.3 overs)	v	Nottinghamshire; 89/1 (21.5 overs)
Bill Athey 22 (45); Richard Logan 5/24 (10 overs)		Darren Bicknell 48* (79); Andrew Poole 1/13 (2.5 overs)

Nottinghamshire won by 9 wickets
Wamil Way, Mildenhall
Umpires: Ian Gould & Ken Palmer
Player of the match: Richard Logan (Nottinghamshire)

27 June 2001
(scorecard)

Surrey Cricket Board; 158 all out (45.1 overs)	v	Surrey; 160/0 (27.1 overs)
Chris Bullen 36 (38); Ed Giddins 2/21 (10 overs)		Mark Butcher 73* (85)

Surrey won by 10 wickets
Woodbridge Road, Guildford
Umpires: Christopher Kelly & Peter Willey
Player of the match: Ed Giddins (Surrey)

27 June 2001
(scorecard)

Gloucestershire; 238/9 (50 overs)	v	Sussex Cricket Board; 143 all out (39.2 overs)
Matthew Windows 82 (123); David Hussey 3/48 (10 overs)		Carl Hopkinson 43 (68); James Averis 2/21 (6 overs)

Gloucestershire won by 95 runs
Cricket Field Road Ground, Horsham
Umpires: John Hampshire & Pasty Harris
Player of the match: Matthew Windows (Gloucestershire)

27 June 2001
(scorecard)

Leicestershire; 332/4 (50 overs)	v	Wales Minor Counties; 199/8 (50 overs)
Jonathan Dakin 179 (145); David Towse 2/52 (10 overs)		Ryan Sylvester 73 (99); Darren Stevens 2/26 (4 overs)

Leicestershire won by 133 runs
St. Helen's, Swansea
Umpires: Mervyn Kitchen & John Steele
Player of the match: Jonathan Dakin (Leicestershire)

=== Fourth round ===
11 July 2001
(scorecard)

Durham; 232 all out (49.2 overs)	v	Gloucestershire; 229/9 (50 overs)
Jonathan Lewis 65 (99); James Averis 4/42 (10 overs)		Matthew Windows 56 (94); Graeme Bridge 3/44 (10 overs)

Durham won by 3 runs
The Royal & Sun Alliance County Ground, Bristol
Umpires: Tony Clarkson & Alan Whitehead
Player of the match: Graeme Bridge (Durham)

11 July 2001
(scorecard)

Northamptonshire; 200 all out (49.1 overs)	v	Kent; 204/4 (47.5 overs)
Paul Taylor 57 (71); Andrew Symonds 5/21 (10 overs)		David Fulton 63 (90); Michael Strong 1/29 (8.5 overs)

Kent won by 6 wickets
St Lawrence Ground, Canterbury
Umpires: John Holder & Jeremy Lloyds
Player of the match: Andrew Symonds (Kent)

11, 12 July 2001
(scorecard)

Sussex; 151 all out (45.1 overs)	v	Lancashire; 155/3 (35.2 overs)
Murray Goodwin 39 (55); John Wood 3/43 (10 overs)		Andrew Flintoff 65* (82); Mark Davis 1/22 (10 overs)

Lancashire won by 7 wickets
Old Trafford, Manchester
Umpires: Vanburn Holder & Ken Palmer
Player of the match: Andrew Flintoff (Lancashire)

- Match was scheduled for one day but extended to two.

11, 12 July 2001
(scorecard)

Nottinghamshire; 176 all out (40.4 overs)	v	Leicestershire; 179/4 (42.1 overs)
Usman Afzaal 49 (80); Shahid Afridi 2/40 (8 overs)		Vince Wells 54 (112); Greg Smith 3/36 (10 overs)

Leicestershire won by 6 wickets
Trent Bridge, Nottingham
Umpires: Nigel Cowley & Ray Julian
Player of the match: Vince Wells (Leicestershire)

- Match was scheduled for one day but extended to two.

11 July 2001
(scorecard)

Glamorgan; 269/6 (50 overs)	v	Somerset; 270/3 (41.4 overs)
Matthew Maynard 93* (108); Andy Caddick 2/44 (10 overs)		Marcus Trescothick 121 (83); Robert Croft 3/56 (10 overs)

Somerset won by 7 wickets
County Ground, Taunton
Umpires: Graham Burgess & Allan Jones
Player of the match: Marcus Trescothick (Somerset)

11 July 2001
(scorecard)

Essex; 160 all out (49.3 overs)	v	Warwickshire; 161/5 (43.1 overs)
Ronnie Irani 48 (89); Neil Carter 4/21 (9.3 overs)		Dougie Brown 52* (91); Paul Grayson 2/27 (10 overs)

Warwickshire won by 5 wickets
Edgbaston, Birmingham
Umpires: Trevor Jesty & Peter Willey
Player of the match: Neil Carter (Warwickshire)

11 July 2001
(scorecard)

Herefordshire; 210 all out (47 overs)	v	Worcestershire; 214/3 (37.1 overs)
Ravi Nagra 105 (107); Kabir Ali 3/35 (10 overs)		Graeme Hick 101* (104); Aamir Farooque 1/36 (5 overs)

Worcestershire won by 7 wickets
New Road, Worcester
Umpires: Jeff Evans & Bob White
Player of the match: Ravi Nagra (Herefordshire)

11, 12 July 2001
(scorecard)

Surrey; 243 all out (50 overs)	v	Yorkshire; 244/8 (48.1 overs)
IanWard 81 (121); Chris Silverwood 3/44 (10 overs)		Gary Fellows 80* (89); Martin Bicknell 3/34 (10 overs)

Yorkshire won by 6 wickets
Headingley, Leeds
Umpires: Neil Mallender & John Steele
Player of the match: Gary Fellows (Yorkshire)

- Match was scheduled for one day but extended to two.

=== Quarter-finals ===
24 July 2001
(scorecard)

Leicestershire; 297/9 (50 overs)	v	Worcestershire; 179 all out (44.5 overs)
Shahid Afridi 67 (44); Alamgir Sheriyar 2/47 (9 overs)		Steve Rhodes 56* (79); Phil DeFreitas 2/17 (6 overs)

Leicestershire won by 118 runs
New Road, Worcester
Umpires: Pasty Harris & Peter Willey
Player of the match: Shahid Afridi (Leicestershire)

25 July 2001
(scorecard)

Somerset; 263/8 (50 overs)	v	Kent; 211 all out (46.2 overs)
Mike Burns 71 (83); Andrew Symonds 2/34 (6 overs)		Rob Key 58 (106); Keith Parsons 3/38 (10 overs)

Somerset won by 52 runs
St Lawrence Ground, Canterbury
Umpires: Nigel Cowley & Trevor Jesty
Player of the match: Mike Burns (Somerset)

25 July 2001
(scorecard)

Durham; 198/8 (50 overs)	v	Lancashire; 199/3 (38.4 overs)
Paul Collingwood 60 (92); Gary Yates 2/23 (10 overs)		Neil Fairbrother 73 (75); Mark Davies 1/39 (8 overs)

Lancashire won by 7 wickets
Stanley Park, Blackpool
Umpires: Graham Burgess & John Hampshire
Player of the match: Andrew Flintoff (Lancashire)

25 July 2001
(scorecard)

Yorkshire; 188 all out (46.3 overs)	v	Warwickshire; 189/6 (44.1 overs)
Anthony McGrath 82 (136); Vasbert Drakes 2/31 (8.3 overs)		Trevor Penney 58 (80); Ryan Sidebottom 3/32 (10 overs)

Warwickshire won by 4 wickets
Headingley, Leeds
Umpires: Tony Clarkson & Neil Mallender
Player of the match: Trevor Penney (Warwickshire)

=== Semi-finals ===
11 August 2001
(scorecard)

Warwickshire; 228/8 (50 overs)	v	Somerset; 230/6 (46 overs)
Mark Wagh 46 (70); Richard Johnson 3/42 (10 overs)		Keith Dutch 61* (54); Dougie Brown 2/41 (8 overs)

Somerset won by 4 wickets
County Ground, Taunton
Umpires: Mervyn Kitchen & Barrie Leadbeater
Player of the match: Keith Dutch (Somerset)

12, 13 August 2001
(scorecard)

Lancashire; 190/9 (50 overs)	v	Leicestershire; 194/3 (29.5 overs)
Warren Hegg 60 (99); Scott Boswell 4/44 (10 overs)		Shahid Afridi 95 (58); Peter Martin 2/47 (8 overs)

Leicestershire won by 7 wickets
Grace Road, Leicester
Umpires: David Constant & Roy Palmer
Player of the match: Shahid Afridi (Leicestershire)

- Match was scheduled for one day but extended to two.

=== Final ===
1 September 2001
(scorecard)

Somerset; 271/5 (50 overs)	v	Leicestershire; 230 all out (45.4 overs)
Keith Parsons 60* (52); Shahid Afridi 3/47 (10 overs)		Trevor Ward 54 (65); Steffan Jones 3/40 (7.4 overs)

Somerset won by 41 runs
Lord's, London
Umpires: Barry Dudleston & George Sharp
Player of the match: Keith Parsons (Somerset)
