= List of Warwickshire Cricket Board List A players =

Warwickshire Cricket Board played in List A cricket matches between 1999 and 2002. This is a list of the players who appeared in those matches.

- Sandy Allen (2002): APW Allen
- Darren Altree (1999): DA Altree
- David Bar (2001–2002): DJ Barr
- Ian Bell (1999): IR Bell
- Kevin Bray (1999–2001): KG Bray
- Andrew Brookes (1999): AP Brookes
- Ian Clifford (2001–2002): JI Clifford
- Daniel Dalton (1999–2002): DAT Dalton
- Richard Dandy (2001): R Dandy
- Michael Dean (2002): MM Dean
- Jan Dreyer (2000): JN Dreyer
- Aamir Farooque (1999): A Farooque
- Michael Foster (2000): MJ Foster
- Simon Gear (2000): S Gear
- Paul Griffiths (2002): PJ Griffiths
- Christopher Howell (1999–2002): CR Howell
- Neil Humphrey (2001–2002): NV Humphrey
- Huw Jones (2001–2002): HR Jones
- Bhavin Joshi (2001): B Joshi
- Wasim Khan (2002): WG Khan
- Shitanshu Kotak (2002): SH Kotak
- Lee Marland (2002): LJ Marland
- Steve McDonald (1999–2001): S McDonald
- Tom Mees (2001): T Mees
- Luke Parker (2001–2002): LC Parker
- Spencer Platt (1999–2001): S Platt
- Navdeep Poonia (2002): NS Poonia
- Guriq Randhawa (2001): GS Randhawa
- Naheem Sajjad (1999–2002): N Sajjad
- Gavin Shephard (2001): GF Shephard
- Jonathan Ship (2001): JA Ship
- Adam Smyth (2000): AC Smyth
- Jamie Spires (2001): JAS Spires
- Jim Troughton (1999–2001): JO Troughton
- Graham Wagg (2000–2002): GG Wagg
- Waqar Mohammad (2001): Waqar Mohammad. Mohammad represented the Warwickshire Cricket Board in a single List A match against Lancashire in the 2001 Cheltenham & Gloucester Trophy. In his only List A match, he scored 2 runs.
- Nick Warren (2001): NA Warren
- Ian Westwood (2001–2002): IJ Westwood
- Elliot Wilson (2002): EJ Wilson
