= Gear (name) =

Gear is a surname. Notable people with the name include:

- C. William Gear (1935–2022), British-American applied mathematician
- Dale Gear (1872–1951), American baseball-player
- Ernest Gear (1887–1955), Newfoundland politician
- Grace Gear (born 1998), English squash player
- George Gear (born 1947), former Australian politician
- George Gear (businessman) (1822–1905), English-born Newfoundland merchant
- Gillian Gear (1943–2015), English historian and archivist
- Glenn Gear (born 1980), Canadian artist and filmmaker
- Henry Gear (1859–1945), Newfoundland businessman and politician
- Hosea Gear (born 1984), New Zealand rugby player
- James Gear (1839–1911), New Zealand butcher, farmer, and businessman
- Jenny Gear (born 1982), Canadian singer
- John H. Gear (1825–1900), United States politician
- Kathleen O'Neal Gear (born 1954), American writer
- Krissy Gear (born 1999), American runner
- Luella Gear (1897–1980), American actress
- Maurie Gear (1934–1988), Australian footballer
- Rico Gear (born 1978), New Zealand rugby player
- Simon Gear (born 1974), English cricketer
- Tom Gear (1949–2018), American politician
- Walter Gear, British astrophysicist
- William Gear (1915–1997), Scottish painter

== Disambiguation pages ==
- Michael Gear (disambiguation)
