= Greg Wright =

English cricketer

Personal information
- Full name: Greg Daniel Wright
- Born: 30 August 1979 (age 47); Wolverhampton, Staffordshire, England
- Batting: Left-handed
- Bowling: Slow left-arm orthodox

Domestic team information
- Years: Team
- 1999–2002: Staffordshire

Career statistics
Competition	List A
Matches	1
Runs scored	1
Batting average	1.00
100s/50s	–/–
Top score	1
Balls bowled	–
Wickets	–
Bowling average	–
5 wickets in innings	–
10 wickets in match	–
Best bowling	–
Catches/stumpings	–/–
- Source: Cricinfo, 13 June 2011

Greg Daniel Wright (born 30 August 1979) is a former English cricketer. Wright was a left-handed batsman who bowled slow left-arm orthodox. He was born in Wolverhampton, Staffordshire.

Wright made his debut for Staffordshire in the 1999 Minor Counties Championship against Northumberland. Wright played Minor counties cricket for Staffordshire from 1999 to 2002, which included 13 Minor Counties Championship matches and 7 MCCA Knockout Trophy matches. In 2001, he made his only List A appearance against the Worcestershire Cricket Board in the Cheltenham & Gloucester Trophy. In this match, he was dismissed for a single run by Mark Hodgkiss.
