= Adam Smith (disambiguation) =

Adam Smith (1723–1790) was a moral philosopher, author and economics pioneer.

Adam Smith may also refer to:

== Academia ==
- Adam T. Smith (fl. 1990s–2010s), American professor of anthropology at Cornell University
- Adam D. Smith (fl. 2000s–2010s), professor of computer science at Boston University

== Politics ==
- Adam Smith (Kansas politician) (fl. 2010s–2020s), member of the Kansas House of Representatives
- Adam Smith (Kentucky) (born 1977), American political activist
- Adam Smith (Washington politician) (born 1965), U.S. representative from Washington

== Sports ==
- Adam Smith (soccer coach) (born 1971), English football coach and former footballer
- Adam Smith (American football) (born 1990), American football offensive guard
- Adam Smith (basketball) (born 1992), basketball player for Hapoel Holon in the Israel Basketball Premier League
- Adam Smith (cricketer) (born 1976), Australian cricketer
- Adam Smith (footballer, born February 1985), English footballer for Chesterfield, Mansfield Town, Lincoln City, and others
- Adam Smith (footballer, born September 1985), English footballer playing for Lowestoft Town
- Adam Smith (footballer, born 1991), English footballer playing for AFC Bournemouth
- Adam Smith (footballer, born 1992), English footballer playing for Hartlepool United
- Adam Smith (ice hockey) (born 1976), Canadian player
- Adam Smith (swimmer) (1903–1985), American freestyle swimmer who competed in the 1924 Summer Olympics

== Television ==
- Adam Smith (TV series), a 1972 British series
- Adam Smith (EastEnders), fictional character in EastEnders
- Adam Smith (Torchwood), fictional character in Torchwood

== Others ==
- Adam Smith (director) (fl. 1990s–2020s), British television director
- Adam Smith, pseudonym of George Goodman (1930–2014), American economics writer and commentator
- Adam Neal Smith (fl. 2000s), American actor, musician and film composer
- Adam Smith (YouTuber) (fl. 2010s–2020s), Australian doctor and YouTuber
- Adam Smith (tenor), British opera singer
- Adam Smith (media executive), American executive at the Walt Disney Company

== See also ==
- Adam Smith College, Fife, Scotland
- Adam Smith Institute, free-market UK think tank
- Adam Smith University, defunct, controversial, unaccredited, private distance learning university based in Liberia
- Adam Smyth (born 1981), English cricketer
- Adam C. Smyth (1840-1909), Latter-day Saint hymn composer
