= Richard Bates =

Richard Bates may refer to:

- Richard Bates (Medal of Honor) (1829–1889), U.S. Navy sailor and Medal of Honor recipient
- Richard Bates (Wiltshire cricketer) (born 1972), English cricketer
- Richard Bates (Nottinghamshire cricketer) (born 1972), English cricketer
- Richard B. Bates (1843–1910), American politician
- Richard Dawson Bates (1876–1949), Northern Irish politician
- Sir Richard Geoffrey Bates, 6th Baronet (1946–2002), of the Bates baronets
- Dick Bates (born 1945), American baseball player
- Richard Bates Jr., American filmmaker

== See also ==
- Bates (surname)
- Rick Bates (born 1965), Australian rally driver
- Dick Bate (1946–2018), English football coach
