= Ravi Nagra =

English cricketer

Personal information
- Full name: Ravinder Singh Nagra
- Born: 29 September 1978 (age 48); West Bromwich, England
- Batting: Right-handed
- Bowling: Left-arm fast-medium

Domestic team information
- Years: Team
- 1999–2003: Herefordshire

Career statistics
Competition	LA
Matches	3
Runs scored	154
Batting average	51.33
100s/50s	1/–
Top score	105
Balls bowled	54
Wickets	–
Bowling average	–
5 wickets in innings	–
10 wickets in match	–
Best bowling	–
Catches/stumpings	1/–
- Source: Cricinfo, 25 November 2010

Ravinder 'Ravi' Singh Nagra (born 29 August 1978) is an English cricketer. Nagra is a right-handed batsman, who bowls left-arm fast-medium; he was born in West Bromwich, West Midlands.

Nagra made his debut for Herefordshire in the 1999 Minor Counties Championship, against Wales Minor Counties. From 1999 to 2003, he represented the county in 10 Championship matches, the last of which came against Devon. His MCCA Knockout Trophy debut for the county came against Wales Minor Counties in 1999; from 1999 to 2002, he represented the county in 7 Trophy matches, the last of which came against the Warwickshire Cricket Board.

He also represented Herefordshire in 3 List A matches. These came against Worcestershire in the 2001 Cheltenham & Gloucester Trophy, Suffolk in the 2nd round of the 2002 Cheltenham & Gloucester Trophy which was played in 2001 and the Durham Cricket Board in the 2nd round of the 2003 Cheltenham & Gloucester Trophy which was played in 2002. In his 3 matches, he scored 154 runs at a batting average of 51.33, with a single century high score of 105, while in the field he took a single catch.
