= Digswell Park =

Cricket ground in Welwyn Garden City, England

Coordinates: 51°49′07.91″N 0°12′28.75″W

- Interactive map of Digswell Park

Ground information
- Location: Welwyn Garden City, Hertfordshire
- Country: England
- Establishment: 1866 (first recorded match)

Team information
Hertfordshire	(2000–2003 & 2008-present)
- As of 25 July 2010; Source: Ground profile

Digswell Park is a cricket ground in Welwyn Garden City, Hertfordshire. The first recorded match on the ground was in 1866 between The Node and Southgate. In 2000, the ground hosted its only Minor Counties Championship match to date, which was between Hertfordshire and Cambridgeshire. In 2003, the ground hosted 2 MCCA Knockout Trophy matches. Hertfordshire resumed their usage of Digswell Park and have to date played 4 further MCCA Knockout Trophy matches on the ground.

The ground has played host to 3 List-A matches, the first of which came in the 2000 NatWest Trophy between Hertfordshire and Cambridgeshire, with the second List-A match coming in the 2001 Cheltenham & Gloucester Trophy between Hertfordshire and the Durham Cricket Board. The third and final List-A match played on the ground was between Hertfordshire and Staffordshire in the 2002 Cheltenham & Gloucester Trophy.

In local domestic cricket, Digswell Park is the home ground of Welwyn Garden City Cricket Club who play in the Hertfordshire Premier Cricket League.
