= Jamie Hart (cricketer) =

English cricketer

Personal information
- Full name: Jamie Paul Hart
- Born: 31 December 1975 (age 50); Blackpool, Lancashire, England
- Batting: Right-handed
- Bowling: Right-arm medium

Domestic team information
- Years: Team
- 2001: Leicestershire Cricket Board
- 2001: Nottinghamshire Cricket Board
- 1995-1996: Nottinghamshire

Career statistics
Competition	FC	LA
Matches	1	6
Runs scored	18	13
Batting average	–	3.25
100s/50s	–/–	–/–
Top score	18*	10
Balls bowled	108	264
Wickets	–	6
Bowling average	–	42.50
5 wickets in innings	–	–
10 wickets in match	–	–
Best bowling	–	3/36
Catches/stumpings	–/–	–/–
- Source: Cricinfo, 16 November 2010

Jamie Paul Hart (born 31 December 1975) is a former English cricketer. Hart was a right-handed batsman who bowled right-arm medium pace. The son of football manager Paul Hart, he was born in Blackpool, Lancashire.

Hart made his debut for Nottinghamshire in a List A match against Somerset in 1995. He represented the county in one further List A match during 1995, which came against Sussex. The following season he played his only first-class match for the county against Yorkshire in the County Championship. In his only first-class match, he scored an unbeaten 18 runs and bowled 18 wicket-less overs.

In 2001, he represented the Nottinghamshire Cricket Board in 2 List A matches against Bedfordshire in the 2001 Cheltenham & Gloucester Trophy and Oxfordshire in the 1st round of the 2002 Cheltenham & Gloucester Trophy which was held in 2001. At the same time, he also played 2 List A matches for the Leicestershire Cricket Board in the same rounds of the same competition's against the Warwickshire Cricket Board and the Kent Cricket Board. In his combined total of 6 List A matches, he scored 13 runs at a batting average of 3.25, with a high score of 10. With the ball he took 6 wickets at a bowling average of 42.50, with best figures of 3/36.

After retiring early from cricket due to injury he became a football agent and has represented several high profile English players.
