= Jonathan Shaw (cricketer) =

English cricketer

Personal information
- Full name: Jonathan William Shaw
- Born: 4 May 1980 (age 46); Nottingham, Nottinghamshire, England
- Batting: Right-handed
- Bowling: Right-arm off break Right-arm medium

Domestic team information
- Years: Team
- 2000–2002, 2008: Herefordshire
- 1999: Nottinghamshire Cricket Board

Career statistics
| Competition | List A |
|---|---|
| Matches | 2 |
| Runs scored | 32 |
| Batting average | 32.00 |
| 100s/50s | 0/0 |
| Top score | 32 |
| Balls bowled | 114 |
| Wickets | 3 |
| Bowling average | 27.66 |
| 5 wickets in innings | 0 |
| 10 wickets in match | – |
| Best bowling | 3/49 |
| Catches/stumpings | 0/– |
- Source: Cricinfo, 23 November 2010

Jonathan William Shaw (born 4 May 1980) is an English cricketer. Shaw is a right-handed batsman who bowls both right-arm off break and right-arm medium pace. He was born in Nottingham, Nottinghamshire.

Shaw represented the Nottinghamshire Cricket Board in a single List A match against Scotland in the 1st round of the 1999 NatWest Trophy.

In 2000, he joined Herefordshire where he made his Minor Counties Championship debut against Dorset and his MCCA Knockout Trophy debut against the Worcestershire Cricket Board. The following year he played his only List A match for the county against the Gloucestershire Cricket Board in the 2nd round of the 2001 Cheltenham & Gloucester Trophy. His is 2 career List A matches, he scored 32 runs at a batting average of 32.00, with a high score of 32. With the ball he took 3 wickets at a bowling average of 27.66, with best figures of 3/49.

Shaw represented Herefordshire in the Minor Counties Championship 11 times from 2000 to 2002 and 7 times in the MCCA Knockout Trophy from 2000 to 2001. In 2008, he rejoined the county where he played a single Championship match against Dorset and a single Trophy match against Berkshire.
