= Jonathan Wright (cricketer) =

English cricketer (born 1965)

Personal information
- Full name: Jonathan Patrick Wright
- Born: 4 June 1965 (age 61); Sheffield, Yorkshire, England
- Batting: Right-handed
- Bowling: Right-arm medium
- Relatives: Frank Wright, Yorkshire CCC

Domestic team information
- Years: Team
- 1999-2001: Worcestershire Cricket Board
- 1995-1999: Herefordshire
- 1991: Shropshire
- 1986-1988: Worcestershire County Cricket Club

Career statistics
Competition	LA
Matches	6
Runs scored	100
Batting average	20.00
100s/50s	–/–
Top score	45
Balls bowled	198
Wickets	10
Bowling average	12.30
5 wickets in innings	1
10 wickets in match	–
Best bowling	5/21
Catches/stumpings	4/–
- Source: Cricinfo, 3 November 2010

Jonathan Patrick Wright (born 4 June 1965) is an English cricketer. Wright is a right-handed batsman who bowls right-arm medium. He was born in Sheffield, Yorkshire.

Wright made his debut for Worcestershire 2nd X1 in 1982 and represented England at U19 level at an International tournament in Holland in 1983. He went on to sign professionally for the county in 1986. Before signing for Worcestershire he represented Leicestershire 2nd X1 in 1984 and 1985. Wright was released by Worcestershire at the end of the 1988 season having been unable to establish himself in the first team at the time of Worcestershire's most successful period in their history. Wright made his debut in minor counties cricket for Shropshire against Wales Minor Counties in the 1991 Minor Counties Championship. He played two further Championship matches for the county during the 1991 season against Oxfordshire and Berkshire. He also represented the county in a single MCCA Knockout Trophy match against Staffordshire.

In 1993 Wright became only the 11th batsman in Birmingham League history to score 1000 runs in a season when he scored 1006 for Old Hill CC.

In 1995, he joined Herefordshire, making his debut for the county in the Minor Counties Championship against Cheshire. From 1995 to 1999, he represented the county in 12 Championship matches, the last of which came against Cornwall. His MCCA Knockout Trophy debut for the county came against Cambridgeshire, with his second and final for the county coming against Wiltshire. He also represented the county in a single List A match against Durham in the 1995 NatWest Trophy.

In 1999, he first represented the Worcestershire Cricket Board in List A cricket against the Kent Cricket Board in the 1999 NatWest Trophy. From 1999 to 2001, he represented the Board in 5 List A matches, the last of which came against Buckinghamshire in the 1st round of the 2002 Cheltenham & Gloucester Trophy which was held in 2001. In his career total of 6 List A matches, he scored 100 runs at a batting average of 20.00, with a high score of 45. In the field he took 4 catches. With the ball he took 10 wickets at a bowling average of 12.30, with a single five wicket haul which gave him best figures of 5/21.

Wright played in 3 National Club Cricket finals at Lords winning 2, one with Stourbridge in 1986 & one with Old Hill in 1993. He also played for Herefordshire in the 1995 MCCA final at Lords vs Cambridgeshire.

He has represented Stourbridge, Old Hill & Kidderminster in the Birmingham League in a 1st team league career which began in 1980. He currently plays club cricket for Old Hill cricket Club in the Birmingham and District Premier League.
