= Tim Coleman (cricketer, born 1971) =

English cricketer

Personal information
- Full name: Timothy Edward Coleman
- Born: 19 June 1971 (age 55); Wellingborough, Northamptonshire, England
- Batting: Right-handed
- Bowling: Right-arm off break

Domestic team information
- Years: Team
- 1999, 2001: Northamptonshire Cricket Board

Career statistics
Competition	LA
Matches	4
Runs scored	214
Batting average	53.50
100s/50s	–/2
Top score	82
Balls bowled	–
Wickets	–
Bowling average	–
5 wickets in innings	–
10 wickets in match	–
Best bowling	–
Catches/stumpings	–/–
- Source: Cricinfo, 21 November 2010

Timothy Edward Coleman (born 19 June 1971) is a former English cricketer. Coleman was a right-handed batsman and bowled right-arm off break. He was born in Wellingborough, Northamptonshire.

Coleman represented the Northamptonshire Cricket Board in List A cricket. His debut List A match came against Wiltshire in the 1999 NatWest Trophy. In 1999 and 2001, he represented the Board in 4 List A matches. Northamptonshire Board beat Yorkshire Cricket Board in the 2nd round of the 2001 Cheltenham & Gloucester Trophy Coleman scoring 82 runs and the Man of the Match award . He made a half century 68 in round 3 against Northamptonshire County Cricket Club . In his 4 List A matches, he scored 214 runs at a batting average of 53.50, with 2 half centuries and a high score of 82.

Coleman also played MCCA Knockout Trophy cricket for Cambridgeshire, making his debut for the county against Norfolk and playing 3 further Trophy matches in the 2000 season.

He played league cricket for Finedon Dolben(6) and Wellingborough Town(1) with 7 Premier league titles . He made 35 Northamptonshire league Centuries, 21 of which were in the Premier Division.

Coleman also had 24 Caps playing 8 a side Indoor cricket for England 1991–1998. Playing in 2 world Cups, with the England Team he toured Australia twice, South Africa twice and New Zealand once.
