= Stuart Shephard =

English cricketer

Personal information
- Full name: Stuart Frederick Shephard
- Born: 20 August 1971 (age 55); Birmingham, Warwickshire, England
- Batting: Right-handed
- Role: Wicket-keeper
- Relatives: Gavin Shephard (twin brother)

Domestic team information
- Years: Team
- 1998–1999: Warwickshire Cricket Board

Career statistics
Competition	First-class	List A
Matches	1	5
Runs scored	5	75
Batting average	2.50	25.00
100s/50s	–/–	–/–
Top score	5	30*
Catches/stumpings	1/–	1/2
- Source: Cricinfo, 1 September 2019

Stuart Frederick Shephard (born 20 August 1971) is an English former cricketer.

Shephard was born at Birmingham in August 1971 and was educated in the city at King Edward VI Camp Hill School for Boys, a Grammar school in his home suburb of Kings Heath, Birmingham. While studying at Loughborough University, he played for the Combined Universities cricket team. He made a single appearance in first-class cricket for the team against the touring Australians at Oxford in 1993. Batting twice in the match, he was dismissed for 5 runs in the Combined Universities first-innings by Brendon Julian, while in their second-innings he was dismissed without scoring by Shane Warne. In addition to playing first-class cricket for the Combined Universities, Shephard also made five appearances in List A one-day cricket for the team, making four appearances in the 1992 Benson & Hedges Cup and a single appearance in the 1993 Benson & Hedges Cup. He later played minor counties cricket for the Warwickshire Cricket Board in MCCA Knockout Trophy in 1998 and 1999.
