= Rawl Lewis =

West Indian cricketer

Personal information
- Full name: Rawl Nicholas Lewis
- Born: 5 September 1974 (age 52); Union Village, Grenada
- Batting: Right-handed
- Bowling: Legbreak Googly
- Role: All-rounder

International information
- National side: West Indies (1997–2009)
- Test debut (cap 218): 17 November 1997 v Pakistan
- Last Test: 2 January 2008 v South Africa
- ODI debut (cap 85): 1 November 1997 v Sri Lanka
- Last ODI: 28 July 2009 v Bangladesh
- Only T20I (cap 22): 18 January 2008 v South Africa

Domestic team information
- Years: Team
- 1991/92–2010: Windward Islands

Career statistics
Competition	Test	ODI	T20I	FC
Matches	5	28	1	131
Runs scored	89	291	0	4,694
Batting average	8.90	18.18	0.00	24.07
100s/50s	0/0	0/0	0/0	2/24
Top score	40	49	0	117*
Balls bowled	883	1,150	6	21,168
Wickets	4	22	0	325
Bowling average	114.00	44.68	–	31.55
5 wickets in innings	0	0	0	12
10 wickets in match	0	0	0	0
Best bowling	2/42	3/43	–	7/66
Catches/stumpings	0/–	7/–	1/–	90/–
- Source: CricketArchive, 2 December 2023

Rawl Nicholas Lewis (born September 5, 1974) is a Grenadan former cricketer. Lewis featured as a leg spinner for both the Windward Islands and the West Indies in his cricketing career. Lewis also formerly managed the West Indies.

== Playing career ==
As a native of Grenada, Lewis primarily featured as a leg spinner. He went on to captain the Windward Islands in their victorious 2000-01 Red Stripe Bowl campaign. He also played for Barrow Cricket Club in England, before being recalled to the West Indies squad for the 2005-06 tour of New Zealand.

Lewis was again recalled to the West Indies team in 2008 for the 2nd Test match against South Africa. He picked up 3 wickets in the match, which the West Indians lost by seven wickets in Cape Town. He played 5 Tests and 26 ODIs in his international career.

== Managerial career ==
He was named as the Windies' interim manager for the 2016 ICC World Twenty20 in India. The West Indians went on to win the competition and Lewis was thereafter appointed as the side's manager on a permanent basis.

== Accolades ==
A stand at the Grenada National Cricket Stadium was jointly renamed in both Lewis and Junior Murray's honour.
