= Bulls Head Ground =

Cricket ground in Coventry, West Midlands, England

Coordinates: 52.40537°N 1.47632°W

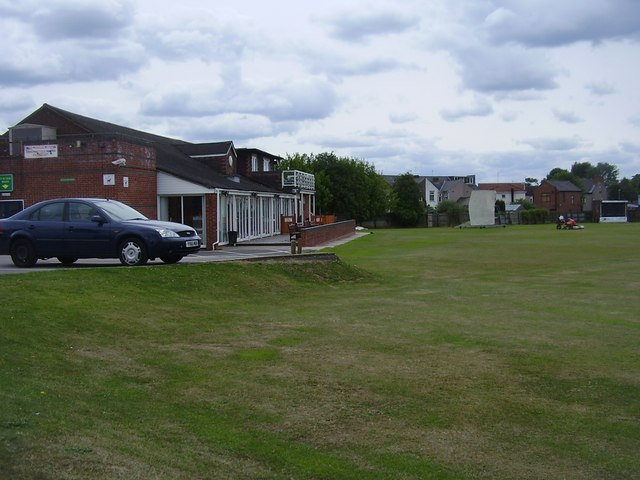
- Interactive map of Bulls Head Ground

Ground information
- Location: Coventry, West Midlands
- Country: England
- Establishment: 1848 (first recorded match)

Team information
Warwickshire	(1903-1919 & 1990-1992)
Warwickshire Cricket Board	(2001-2002)
- As of 28 August 2010; Source: Ground profile

Bulls Head Ground is a cricket ground in Coventry, West Midlands. The first recorded match on the ground was in 1848, when Coventry played an All England Eleven. It hosted its first first-class match in 1903, which was between Warwickshire and the Gentlemen of Philadelphia. From 1909 to 1919, the ground played host to 12 first-class matches. First-class cricket returned to the Bulls Head in 1990, and from 1990 to 1992 it hosted a further 3 first-class matches, the last of which was between Warwickshire and Middlesex.

The ground has also hosted List-A matches, the first of which was between the Warwickshire Cricket Board and the Leicestershire Cricket Board in the 2001 Cheltenham & Gloucester Trophy. The ground has held 2 further List-A matches, between the Warwickshire Cricket Board and Leicestershire in the 2002 Cheltenham & Gloucester Trophy and between the Board and Herefordshire in the 1st round of the 2003 Cheltenham & Gloucester Trophy which was held in 2002.

Additionally, between 1961 and 2009, the ground has played host to a number of Warwickshire Second XI matches in the Second XI Championship and Second XI Trophy, hosting a combined total of 32 Second XI matches.

The Bulls Head has also hosted ICC Trophy matches, starting in the 1979 ICC Trophy when it held a single match which was contested between Argentina and East Africa and in the 1986 ICC Trophy when it hosted a single match between Bangladesh and East Africa.

In local domestic cricket, the Bulls Head is the home venue of Coventry and North Warwickshire Cricket Club, who played in the Birmingham and District Premier League Division One.
