= Ian Blanchett =

Australian-born English cricketer

Personal information
- Full name: Ian Neale Blanchett
- Born: 2 October 1975 (age 51); Melbourne, Victoria, Australia
- Height: 6 ft 4 in (1.93 m)
- Batting: Right-handed
- Bowling: Right-arm fast-medium

Domestic team information
- Years: Team
- 2001–2002: Cambridgeshire
- 1997–1999: Middlesex
- 1994: Norfolk

Career statistics
Competition	First-class	List A
Matches	5	14
Runs scored	36	39
Batting average	7.20	9.75
100s/50s	0/0	0/0
Top score	18	20
Balls bowled	624	474
Wickets	7	10
Bowling average	60.42	41.30
5 wickets in innings	0	0
10 wickets in match	0	–
Best bowling	2/38	3/24
Catches/stumpings	2/–	5/–
- Source: Cricinfo, 25 April 2011

Ian Neale Blanchett (born 2 October 1975) is an Australian-born English former cricketer. He was a right-handed batsman who bowled right-arm fast-medium. He was born in Melbourne, Victoria.

Educated at Downham Market High School and later Luton University, Blanchett first appeared in county cricket for Norfolk in the 1994 Minor Counties Championship, playing two matches against Bedfordshire and Suffolk. Blanchett later joined Middlesex, making his debut for them in a List A match against Essex in 1997. His first-class debut for the county came against Worcestershire in the 1998 County Championship. He played four further first-class matches for Middlesex till 1999 and eleven further List A matches. In first-class cricket for Middlesex, he took 7 wickets at a bowling average of 60.42, with best figures of 2/38. In List A cricket for Middlesex, he took 5 wickets at an expensive average of 70.00, with best figures of 2/34.

In 2001, Blanchett joined Cambridgeshire. He made his debut in the 2001 MCCA Knockout Trophy against Bedfordshire. He played Minor counties of English and Welsh cricket for Cambridgeshire in 2001 and 2002, which included ten Minor Counties Championship matches and eight MCCA Knockout Trophy matches. Blanchett also played two List A matches for the county, against the Derbyshire Cricket Board in the 2nd round of the 2001 Cheltenham & Gloucester Trophy and Somerset in the 3rd round of the same competition. With the ball he was more successful for Cambridgeshire, taking 5 wickets at an average of 12.60, with best figures of 3/24.

He had previously played Second XI cricket for the Essex Second XI, the Middlesex Second XI, the Kent Second XI and the Somerset Second XI. After the end of his cricket career, Blanchett coached at Ealing College and abroad in Australia and New Zealand. He later played for Williamstown Imperials Cricket Club in the Victorian Turf Cricket Association.
