= Steve McDonald (cricketer) =

English cricketer

Personal information
- Full name: Stephen McDonald
- Born: 2 October 1974 (age 52); Birmingham, Warwickshire, England
- Batting: Right-handed
- Bowling: Right-arm off break

Domestic team information
- Years: Team
- 1999–2001: Warwickshire Cricket Board

Career statistics
Competition	LA
Matches	4
Runs scored	51
Batting average	12.75
100s/50s	–/–
Top score	25
Balls bowled	18
Wickets	–
Bowling average	–
5 wickets in innings	–
10 wickets in match	–
Best bowling	–
Catches/stumpings	–/–
- Source: Cricinfo, 26 October 2010

Stephen 'Steve' McDonald (born 2 October 1974) is a former English cricketer. McDonald was a right-handed batsman who bowled right-arm off break. He was born at Birmingham, Warwickshire.

McDonald represented the Warwickshire Cricket Board in List A cricket. His debut List A match came against Berkshire in the 1999 NatWest Trophy. From 1999 to 2001, he represented the Board in 4 matches, the last of which came against Lancashire in the 2001 Cheltenham & Gloucester Trophy. In his 5 List A matches, he scored 51 runs at a batting average of 12.75, with a high score of 25.
