= Stuart Barnes (cricketer) =

English cricketer (born 1970)

Personal information
- Full name: Stuart Neil Barnes
- Born: 27 June 1970 (age 56); Bath, Somerset, England
- Batting: Right-handed
- Bowling: Right-arm medium

Domestic team information
- Years: Team
- 2000–2001: Gloucestershire Cricket Board
- 1993–1998: Wiltshire
- 1989–1991: Gloucestershire

Career statistics
Competition	FC	LA
Matches	11	17
Runs scored	23	27
Batting average	3.28	9.00
100s/50s	–/–	–/–
Top score	12*	11*
Balls bowled	1,314	810
Wickets	16	16
Bowling average	39.06	38.50
5 wickets in innings	–	–
10 wickets in match	–	–
Best bowling	4/51	3/39
Catches/stumpings	3/–	4/–
- Source: Cricinfo, 12 October 2010

Stuart Neil Barnes (born 27 June 1970) is a former English cricketer. Barnes was a right-handed batsman who bowled right-arm medium pace. He was born at Bath, Somerset.

Barnes made his first-class debut for Gloucestershire in a List A match against Surrey in 1989. From 1989 to 1991, he represented the county in 11 List A matches, the last of which came against the touring West Indians. He made his first-class debut for Gloucestershire in 1990 against the touring Zimbabweans. From 1990 to 1991, he represented the county in 11 first-class matches, the last of which came against Oxford University. In his 11 first-class matches he took 16 wickets at a bowling average of 39.06, with best figures of 4/51.

Barnes joined Wiltshire in 1993, making his Minor Counties Championship debut for the county against Devon. From 1993 to 1998, he represented the county in 12 Minor Counties Championship matches, the last of which came against Devon. Barnes also represented Wiltshire in the MCCA Knockout Trophy, making his debut in that tournament against Cornwall in 1993. From 1993 to 1998, he represented the county in 10 Trophy matches, the last of which came against the Warwickshire Cricket Board. Barnes also played a single List A match against Durham in the 1993 NatWest Trophy.

In 2000, Barnes played his first List A match for the Gloucestershire Cricket Board in the 2000 NatWest Trophy against the Nottinghamshire Cricket Board. From 2000 to 2001, he represented the Board in 5 List A matches, the last of which came against the Yorkshire Cricket Board in the 2nd round of the 2002 Cheltenham & Gloucester Trophy which was held in 2001. In his 17 career List A matches, he took a single 16 wickets at an average of 38.50, with best figures of 3/39.
