= Paul O'Reilly (cricketer) =

English cricketer (born 1962)

Personal information
- Full name: Paul John O'Reilly
- Born: 4 August 1962 (age 64); Waterford, County Waterford, Ireland
- Batting: Right-handed
- Bowling: Right-arm fast-medium

Domestic team information
- Years: Team
- 1996–2003: Hertfordshire

Career statistics
| Competition | List A |
|---|---|
| Matches | 4 |
| Runs scored | 10 |
| Batting average | – |
| 100s/50s | 0/0 |
| Top score | 10* |
| Balls bowled | 144 |
| Wickets | 2 |
| Bowling average | 48.50 |
| 5 wickets in innings | 0 |
| 10 wickets in match | 0 |
| Best bowling | 2/54 |
| Catches/stumpings | 0/– |
- Source: Cricinfo, 6 June 2011

Paul John O'Reilly (born 4 August 1962) is a former English cricketer. O'Reilly was a right-handed batsman who bowled right-arm fast-medium.

O'Reilly made his debut for Hertfordshire in the 1996 MCCA Knockout Trophy against Dorset. O'Reilly played Minor counties cricket for Hertfordshire from 1996 to 2003, which included 26 Minor Counties Championship matches and 9 MCCA Knockout Trophy matches. In 2001, he made his List A debut against the Durham Cricket Board in the Cheltenham & Gloucester Trophy. He made 3 further List A appearances for the county, the last coming against Bedfordshire in the 1st round of the 2003 Cheltenham & Gloucester Trophy, which was held in 2002. In his 4 List A matches, he took 2 wickets at an average of 48.50, with best figures of 2/54.
