= Oliver Clayson =

English cricketer (born 1980)

Personal information
- Full name: Oliver James Clayson
- Born: 25 April 1980 (age 46); Bedford, Bedfordshire
- Nickname: Clayson
- Batting: Right-handed
- Bowling: Right-arm off break
- Role: Opening batsmen, mid-overs bowler

Domestic team information
- Years: Team
- 1999–2012: Bedfordshire

Career statistics
Competition	List A
Matches	5
Runs scored	99
Batting average	33.00
100s/50s	0/1
Top score	56*
Catches/stumpings	0/–
- Source: Cricinfo, 28 May 2011

Oliver James Clayson (born 25 April 1980) is an English cricketer. Clayson is a right-handed batsman who bowls right-arm off break. He was born in Bedford, Bedfordshire and educated at Bedford Modern School.

Clayson made his debut for Bedfordshire in the 1999 Minor Counties Championship against Buckinghamshire at Luton. Clayson has played Minor counties cricket for Bedfordshire from 1999 to present, which has included 50 Minor Counties Championship matches and 25 MCCA Knockout Trophy matches. He made his List A debut against Northumberland in the 2nd round of the 2000 NatWest Trophy. He played 4 further List A matches, the last coming against Devon in the 2nd round of the 2002 Cheltenham & Gloucester Trophy, which was held in 2001. In his 5 matches, he scored 99 runs at an average of 33.00, with a high score of 56*. His highest score came against the Nottinghamshire Cricket Board in the 2001 Cheltenham & Gloucester Trophy. He won the Wilfred Rhodes Trophy for the leading Minor Counties batsman in 2010 having scored 699 runs at an average of 77.66. He now is head of cricket at a school in Surrey.
