= Joi Arcand =

First Nations photographer from Saskatchewan (born 1982)

- Born: Joi T. Arcand; 1982 (age 43–44); Hafford, Saskatchewan, Canada
- Citizenship: Muskeg Lake Cree Nation and Canada
- Education: University of Saskatchewan
- Known for: Photographer
- Website: joitarcand.com

Joi T. Arcand (born 1982) is a nehiyaw photo-based artist from Muskeg Lake Cree Nation, Saskatchewan, who currently resides in Ottawa, Ontario. In addition to art, Arcand focuses on publishing, art books, zines, collage and accessibility to art.

== Early life and education ==
Arcand was born in 1982 in Hafford, Saskatchewan. She grew up on Muskeg Lake Cree Nation in central Saskatchewan. She spent many summers working in the Muskeg Lake Archives which gave Arcand her love of old photographs and history. Arcand later attended the University of Saskatchewan where she received a Bachelor of Fine Arts degree with Great Distinction in 2005. She began making artwork that addressed her identity in the second year of her studies at the University, at which point she decided to focus on photography and printmaking. Her first photography projects were in direct response to the images of photographer Edward S. Curtis, who was working in the early 1900s.

== Work ==
Arcand has served as chair of the board of directors for Paved Art and New Media in Saskatoon, and along with Felicia Gay was the co-founder of the Red Shift Gallery, a contemporary Aboriginal art gallery also in Saskatoon that was in operation from 2006 to 2010.

She was the founder of Kimiwan, a 'zine for Indigenous artists and writers that published eight issues from 2012 to 2014. Arcand curated the zine with her cousin Mika Lafond as a way to showcase Aboriginal-inspired visual art and writings. The magazine focused on decolonization, healing and family. Arcand took inspiration from her involvement in the R.A.I.N. (radical art in nature) collective in Vancouver to found Kimiwan. She has also been published in BlackFlash magazine.

Arcand was the Nigig Visiting Artist in Residence in Indigenous Visual Culture with the Faculty of Design at OCAD University from 15 October – 11 November 2017. Her work has been exhibited at Gallery 101 (Ottawa), York Quay Gallery (Toronto), Mendel Art Gallery and Paved Arts (Saskatoon), and Grunt gallery (Vancouver).

Arcand's work explores personal and political experiences through the lens of her mixed-race identity. Arcand explores the revitalization of the Cree language through her art and has studied the language her whole life. She said that, "Language is culture. There are far too many Indigenous languages that are either extinct or endangered. Cree has been named one of the three languages that remain 'viable' by Statistics Canada; the number of speakers varies from 12,000–75,000. However, I realized that my own inability to speak the language means that in my family, the language is extinct. This realization triggered urgency in me that the time is now to start revitalizing our indigenous languages." Some of her past work depicts a world where English and French signage is replaced with the Cree language.

Arcand appeared as an extra on the set of the Portlandia television series in 2015.

Arcand was the curator of a collective mural project in Ottawa from 21 June 2018 to October 2019 titled nākatēyimisowin – Taking Care of Oneself. This project was funded and organized by Heritage Canada and was launched on the National Indigenous Peoples Day on 21 June 2018. Four Indigenous artists created the murals; Cedar Eve Peters, who is Anishinaabe, Ojibwe (Shifting of Energies), Glenn Gear, who is Inuk (Ommatik – Heart), Michelle Sound, who is a member of the Swan River First Nation and Red River Métis (Kahkiyaw acāhkosak – All the Stars), and Tara-Lynn Kozma-Perrin, who is Cree (We Are Resilient). These murals are located in the pedestrian tunnel under Wellington Street at the Portage bridge. Arcand explained that she "wanted to address self-care from an Indigenous perspective. Indigenous peoples are always sort of required to resist. We have peoples, we have activists, we have artists who are constantly pushing back against colonialism and all the struggles that come with that. I wanted to take a step back and think about like what happens when we stop resisting and just take care of each other. Each of the artists had their own interpretation of what that meant and what I've found interesting as a curator, even though the theme was center around the self, really the self in the community are inseparable, and I like that you come across it without expecting it."

She designs jewelry featuring Indigenous languages in a recent project titled Mad Aunty.

Arcand currently acts as the Director of the Nordic Lab – a new space dedicated to artists from the circumpolar region – at artist-run-centre SAW Gallery in Ottawa.

== Exhibitions ==
=== Solo exhibitions ===
- oskinikiskwéwak (Young Women), 2012
- Through That Which Is Scene, 2013
- Official Language – Joi Arcand, 2014
- Through That Which Is Scene, 2016
- ᓇᒨᔭ ᓂᑎᑌᐧᐃᐧᓇ ᓂᑕᔮᐣ (I don't have my words), 2017, Walter Philips Gallery, Banff Centre.
- Language of Puncture, 2017

=== Group exhibitions ===
- When Raven Became Spider, 2016–2018 (Touring), organized by Dunlop Art Gallery
- Insurgence/Resurgence, 2018, Winnipeg Art Gallery.
- Àbadakone – Continuous Fire, 2019–2020, National Gallery of Canada.

== Awards ==
- 2018 Sobey Art Award Finalist
