= Greg Willott =

English cricketer

Personal information
- Full name: Greg Richard Willott
- Born: 13 June 1980 (age 46); Stoke-on-Trent, Staffordshire, England
- Batting: Left-handed
- Bowling: Left-arm fast-medium

Domestic team information
- Years: Team
- 2000–present: Staffordshire

Career statistics
Competition	List A
Matches	2
Runs scored	4
Batting average	4.00
100s/50s	–/–
Top score	4
Balls bowled	78
Wickets	3
Bowling average	22.66
5 wickets in innings	–
10 wickets in match	–
Best bowling	2/47
Catches/stumpings	1/–
- Source: Cricinfo, 13 June 2011

Greg Richard Willott (born 13 June 1980) is an English cricketer. Willott is a left-handed batsman who bowls left-arm fast-medium. He was born in Stoke-on-Trent, Staffordshire.

Willott made his debut for Staffordshire in the 1999 Minor Counties Championship against Cumberland. Willott has played Minor counties cricket for Staffordshire from 1999 to present, which has included 29 Minor Counties Championship matches and 26 MCCA Knockout Trophy matches. In 2001, he made his List A debut against the Worcestershire Cricket Board in the Cheltenham & Gloucester Trophy. He played a further List A match against Surrey in the 2003 Cheltenham & Gloucester Trophy. In his 2 List A matches, he took 3 wickets at an average of 22.66, with best figures of 2/47.
