= Jamie Haynes =

English cricketer (born 1974)

Personal information
- Full name: Jamie Jonathan Haynes
- Born: 5 July 1974 (age 52); Bristol, England
- Batting: Right-handed
- Role: Wicket-keeper

Domestic team information
- Years: Team
- 1998: Lancashire Cricket Board
- 1996–2004: Lancashire

Career statistics
Competition	FC	LA	T20
Matches	20	20	3
Runs scored	491	153	9
Batting average	19.64	17.00	9.00
100s/50s	0/3	0/1	0/0
Top score	80	59*	9
Catches/stumpings	47/3	26/7	3/2
- Source: Cricinfo, 12 June 2012

Jamie Jonathan Haynes (born 5 July 1974) is an English former cricketer. Haynes is a right-handed batsman who fields as a wicket-keeper. He was born at Bristol.

Haynes made his first-class debut for Lancashire against Middlesex at Old Trafford in the 1996 County Championship. It was in that same season that he made his List A debut against Northamptonshire in the 1996 AXA Equity & Law League. These were his only appearances in 1997, with regular wicket-keeper Warren Hegg limiting his opportunities in the first eleven, a situation which would remain for the remainder of Haynes' time at Lancashire. In 1997, he made two first-class appearances in the County Championship against Yorkshire and Kent. Although he didn't feature for Lancashire in 1998, he did make a single MCCA Knockout Trophy appearance for the Lancashire Cricket Board against Shropshire. He next appeared for Lancashire in 1999, making two first-class appearances against Cambridge University and Sri Lanka A.

The following season he made a single first-class appearance against New Zealand A, as well as making his first List A appearance since his debut in that format back in 1996, with Haynes making two appearances in the 2000 Norwich Union National League against Somerset and Sussex. He appeared more frequently for the county in 2001, making five first-class and six List A appearances. He found his opportunities limited once more in 2002, making three first-class appearances and the same number of List A appearances, while in the season that followed he also found opportunities limited, making two first-class appearances against Durham UCCE and Essex, as well as making one List A appearance against India A. He made his Twenty20 debut in the 2003 Twenty20 Cup against Northamptonshire. In his final season at Lancashire, with Haynes making four further first-class appearances, the last of which came against Kent in the 2004 County Championship. He did however gain an extended run in Lancashire's one-day squad, making seven List A appearances in the 2004 totesport League, with his final appearance coming against Surrey. He also made two Twenty20 appearances against Nottinghamshire and Hampshire in the 2004 Twenty20 Cup. He was released by Lancashire following the conclusion of the 2004 season.

In total, he made twenty first-class appearances for Lancashire, scoring 491 runs at an average of 19.64, with a high score of 80. This score was one of three half centuries he made and came against Sri Lanka A in 1999. Behind the stumps he took 47 catches and four stumpings. He also appeared twenty times in List A cricket, scoring 153 runs at an average of 17.00, with a high score of 59 not out. This score was his only half century in the format and came against the Warwickshire Cricket Board in the 2001 Cheltenham & Gloucester Trophy. He took 25 catches and made seven stumpings from behind the stumps in one-day cricket.
