= Paddy O'Hara =

Irish cricket umpire (born 1938)

Paddy O'Hara (born 20 July 1938) is an Irish cricket umpire. O'Hara first officiated a match of note in the 1994 ICC Trophy between Canada and Singapore. He stood in 15 matches during that tournament. O'Hara later stood in his first first-class match in 1997 between Ireland and Scotland, standing in the same fixture two years later. These remain the only first-class matches he has stood in as an on-field umpire. It was also in 1999 that O'Hara officiated in his first List A match between Ireland and Essex in the 1999 NatWest Trophy. He later stood in two further List A fixtures involving matches between Cheshire and Lincolnshire and the Worcestershire Cricket Board and Cumberland in the 2000 NatWest Trophy and 2001 Cheltenham & Gloucester Trophy respectively.

O'Hara is currently an umpire manager on the ICC Europe Umpires Panel.
