= Gilliver =

Gilliver is a surname. Notable people with the surname include:

- Allan Gilliver (1944–2025), English footballer
- Mark Gilliver (born 1969), English cricketer
- Peter Gilliver (born 1964), British lexicographer and dictionary editor
- Piers Gilliver (born 1994), British wheelchair fencer
