= Porthill =

Porthill can refer to several places:

- Port Hill in Oxfordshire
- Porthill, Idaho
- Porthill, Shropshire
- Porthill, Staffordshire
- Porthill-Rykerts Border Crossing, on the Canada–United States border
- Porthill Bridge
- Porthill Park
- Porthilly

== See also ==
- Port Hills (disambiguation)
