= Paul Marks =

Paul Marks may refer to:

- Paul Marks (cricketer) (born 1967), English cricketer
- Paul Marks (scientist) (1926–2020), medical doctor, researcher and administrator
- Paul D. Marks (died 2021), American novelist and short story writer
- Paul Marks (referee), rugby referee
- Paul Marks, producer of the late 1990s TV series Time of Your Life

== See also ==
- Paul Marx (disambiguation)
- Paul Mark (fl. 2000s–2020s), member of the Massachusetts House of Representatives
