= Hodgkiss =

Hodgkiss is a surname. Notable people with the surname include:

- Amber Hodgkiss (born 1991), British actress
- David Hodgkiss (1949–2020), British administrator and CEO
- Ed Hodgkiss (born 1970), American football coach
- Jared Hodgkiss (born 1986), English footballer
- Mark Hodgkiss (born 1977), English cricketer
