= Spencer Platt (cricketer) =

English cricketer

Personal information
- Full name: Spencer Platt
- Born: 24 August 1974 (age 52); Coventry, Warwickshire, England
- Batting: Left-handed
- Role: Wicketkeeper

Domestic team information
- Years: Team
- 1999–2001: Warwickshire Cricket Board

Career statistics
| Competition | LA |
|---|---|
| Matches | 5 |
| Runs scored | 65 |
| Batting average | 13.00 |
| 100s/50s | –/– |
| Top score | 22 |
| Balls bowled | – |
| Wickets | – |
| Bowling average | – |
| 5 wickets in innings | – |
| 10 wickets in match | – |
| Best bowling | – |
| Catches/stumpings | 1/3 |
- Source: Cricinfo, 26 October 2010

Spencer Platt (born 24 August 1974) is a former English cricketer. Platt was a left-handed batsman who played primarily as a wicketkeeper. He was born at Coventry, Warwickshire.

Platt represented the Warwickshire Cricket Board in List A cricket. His debut List A match came against Berkshire in the 1999 NatWest Trophy. From 1999 to 2001, he represented the Board in 5 matches, the last of which came against Cambridgeshire in the 2nd round of the 2002 Cheltenham & Gloucester Trophy, which was held in 2001. In his 5 List A matches, he scored 65 runs at a batting average of 13.00, with a high score of 22. Behind the stumps he took a single catch and made 3 stumpings.
