= Richard Dandy =

English cricketer

Personal information
- Full name: Richard Dandy
- Born: 30 November 1977 (age 48); Birmingham, Warwickshire, England
- Batting: Right-handed

Domestic team information
- Years: Team
- 2001: Warwickshire Cricket Board

Career statistics
Competition	LA
Matches	1
Runs scored	0
Batting average	0.00
100s/50s	–/–
Top score	0
Balls bowled	–
Wickets	–
Bowling average	–
5 wickets in innings	–
10 wickets in match	–
Best bowling	–
Catches/stumpings	–/–
- Source: Cricinfo, 25 October 2010

Richard Dandy (born 30 November 1977) is a former English cricketer. Dandy was a right-handed batsman. He was born at Birmingham, Warwickshire.

Dandy represented the Warwickshire Cricket Board in a single List A match against the Leicestershire Cricket Board in the 2001 Cheltenham & Gloucester Trophy. In his only List A match, he was dismissed for a duck.
