= George Campbell (cricketer, born 1979) =

English cricketer

Personal information
- Full name: George Richard Angus Campbell
- Born: 9 February 1979 (age 47); Hammersmith, London, England
- Batting: Left-handed
- Role: Occasional wicketkeeper

Domestic team information
- Years: Team
- 2000–2002: Sussex Cricket Board

Career statistics
Competition	LA
Matches	7
Runs scored	346
Batting average	49.42
100s/50s	1/3
Top score	141
Balls bowled	–
Wickets	–
Bowling average	–
5 wickets in innings	–
10 wickets in match	–
Best bowling	–
Catches/stumpings	1/–
- Source: Cricinfo, 23 October 2010

George Richard Angus Campbell (born 9 February 1979) is an English cricketer. Campbell is a left-handed batsman who plays occasionally as a wicketkeeper. He was born at Hammersmith, London.

Campbell represented the Sussex Cricket Board in List A cricket. His debut List A game came against Herefordshire in the 2000 NatWest Trophy. From 2000 to 2002, he represented the Board in 7 List A matches, the last of which came against Worcestershire Cricket Board in the 2nd round of the 2003 Cheltenham & Gloucester Trophy which was held in 2002. In his 7 List A matches, he scored 346 runs at a batting average of 49.24, with 3 half centuries and a single century high score of 141. In the field he took a single catch.

As of 2010 he plays club cricket for Hastings & St. Leonards Priory Cricket Club in the Sussex Cricket League.
