= Ryan Sylvester =

Welsh cricketer (born 1975)

Personal information
- Full name: Ryan William Sylvester
- Born: 20 April 1975 (age 51); Cardiff, Glamorgan, Wales
- Batting: Right-handed
- Bowling: Leg break

Domestic team information
- Years: Team
- 1999–2002: Wales Minor Counties
- 1998: Herefordshire

Career statistics
Competition	LA
Matches	12
Runs scored	294
Batting average	29.40
100s/50s	–/3
Top score	73
Balls bowled	40
Wickets	–
Bowling average	–
5 wickets in innings	–
10 wickets in match	–
Best bowling	–
Catches/stumpings	2/–
- Source: Cricinfo, 2 January 2011

Ryan William Sylvester (born 20 April 1975) is a Welsh cricketer. Sylvester is a right-handed batsman who bowls leg break. He was born at Cardiff, Glamorgan.

Sylvester made his debut in the Minor Counties Championship for Herefordshire in 1998, playing just a single match for them against Oxfordshire. The following season he joined Wales Minor Counties, making his Minor Counties Championship debut for them against Cornwall. From 1999 to 2002, he represented the team in 21 Championship matches, the last of which came against Cornwall. His MCCA Knockout Trophy debut for the team came in 1999 against Herefordshire. From 1999 to 2001, Sylvester represented the team in 7 Trophy matches, the last of which came against the Warwickshire Cricket Board.

His debut List A appearance for the team came in the 1st round of the 1999 NatWest Trophy against Lincolnshire. From 1999 to 2002, he represented the team in 12 List A matches, the last of which came against Cornwall in the 2nd round of the 2003 Cheltenham & Gloucester Trophy which was played in 2002. In his 12 List A matches, he scored 294 runs at a batting average of 29.40, with three half centuries and a high score of 73.

Sylvester previously played Second XI cricket for the Glamorgan Second XI and Gloucestershire Second XI. He currently plays club cricket for Sully Centurions Cricket Club in the South Wales Cricket League.
