= Paul Marx =

Paul Marx may refer to:

- Paul Marx (monk) (1920–2010), American Roman Catholic priest and Benedictine monk
- Paul John Marx (1935–2018), French Roman Catholic bishop

== See also ==
- Paul Marks (disambiguation)
