= Luctonians Cricket Club Ground =

Cricket ground in Herefordshire, England

Coordinates: 52°15′09″N 2°49′46″W

Mortimer Park
Ground information
- Location: Kingsland, Herefordshire
- Country: England
- Establishment: 1914; 111 years ago
- End names
- Orchard End; Village End

Team information
Herefordshire	(1998–2006)
- As of 27 August 2023; Source: Ground profile

The Luctonians Cricket Club Ground in Kingsland, Herefordshire, England is the home ground of Luctonians Cricket Club.

It has been used for senior cricket on only one occasion, when it staged the C&G Trophy match between Herefordshire and Middlesex in June 2001. The game was the scene of a remarkable three-wicket win for the minor county, achieved from the penultimate ball of the match. Herefordshire opening batsman Harshad Patel's 68 won him the man-of-the-match award.

The ground has also been used by Herefordshire on a number of occasions for games in the Minor Counties Championship, MCC Trophy, ECB 38-County Cup and MCCA Knock-Out Trophy.

Its ends are known as the "Orchard End" and the "Village End".
