= Andrew Jackman (cricketer) =

West Indian cricketer

Personal information
- Full name: Andrew Fitz Donald Jackman
- Born: 27 January 1963 (age 63); Georgetown, Demerara, Guyana
- Batting: Right-handed
- Bowling: Right-arm off break

Domestic team information
- Years: Team
- 1999-2002: Nottinghamshire Cricket Board
- 1983/84-1990/91: Guyana
- 1981/82-1989/90: Demerara

Career statistics
| Competition | FC | LA |
|---|---|---|
| Matches | 42 | 22 |
| Runs scored | 2,238 | 466 |
| Batting average | 37.93 | 23.30 |
| 100s/50s | 5/9 | –/4 |
| Top score | 125 | 73 |
| Balls bowled | 75 | 12 |
| Wickets | 3 | – |
| Bowling average | 16.33 | – |
| 5 wickets in innings | – | – |
| 10 wickets in match | – | – |
| Best bowling | 2/25 | – |
| Catches/stumpings | 25/– | 9/– |
- Source: Cricinfo, 24 November 2010

Andrew Fitz Donald Jackman (born 27 January 1963) is a former Guyanese cricketer. Jackman was a right-handed batsman who bowled right-arm off break. He was born in Georgetown, Guyana.

Jackman made his first-class debut for Demerara against Berbice in the 1981/82 West Indian cricket season. From the 1981/82 season to the 1989/90 season, he represented Demerara in 7 first-class matches. He also played first-class cricket for Guyana, representing the team in 28 first-class matches between the 1981/82 season and the 1989/90 season, with his final first-class appearance for them against Barbados. As well as Demerara and Guyana, he also played a handful of first-class matches for West Indies B, West Indies Board President's XI and West Indies Under-23s.

In his career total of 42 first-class matches, he scored 2,238 runs at a batting average of 37.93, with 9 half centuries and 5 centuries and a high score of 125. In the field he took 25 catches and with the ball he took 3 wickets at a bowling average of 16.33, with best figures of 2/25.

It was for Guyana that he made his debut in List A cricket in 1994 against Jamaica. From the 1983/84 season to the 1990/91 season, he represented Guyana in 14 List A matches, the last of which came against Barbados. Jackman also played 4 List A matches West Indies B.

He later represented the Nottinghamshire Cricket Board in List A matches, making his debut for the Board against Scotland in the 1999 NatWest Trophy. From 1999 to 2002, he represented the Board in 4 List A matches, the last of which came against Cumberland in the 1st round of the 2003 Cheltenham & Gloucester Trophy which was played in 2002. In total, Jackman played 22 career List A matches, during which he scored 466 runs at an average of 23.30, with 4 half centuries and a high score of 73, while in the field he took 9 catches.
