= Gavin Shephard =

English cricketer

Personal information
- Full name: Gavin Francis Shephard
- Born: 20 August 1971 (age 55); Birmingham, Warwickshire, England
- Batting: Right-handed
- Bowling: Left-arm medium
- Relatives: Stuart Shephard (twin brother)

Domestic team information
- Years: Team
- 1995–1997: Herefordshire
- 2001: Warwickshire Cricket Board

Career statistics
Competition	List A
Matches	2
Runs scored	88
Batting average	–
100s/50s	–/1
Top score	73*
Balls bowled	72
Wickets	1
Bowling average	22.00
5 wickets in innings	–
10 wickets in match	–
Best bowling	1/14
Catches/stumpings	2/–
- Source: Cricinfo, 25 October 2010

Gavin Francis Shephard (born 20 August 1971) is an English cricketer. Shephard is a right-handed batsman who bowls left-arm medium pace. He was born at Birmingham, Warwickshire.

Shephard made his debut for Herefordshire in the 1995 MCCA Knockout Trophy against Cumberland. He played a second and final Trophy match for the county in 1997 against Cornwall. He also played a single Minor Counties Championship match for the county against Oxfordshire in 1997.

Shephard later represented the Warwickshire Cricket Board in 2 List A matches against the Leicestershire Cricket Board and Lancashire in the 2001 Cheltenham & Gloucester Trophy. In his 2 List A matches, he scored 88, although with 2 not out innings, he is without a batting average. His List A high score was 73*. In the field he took 2 catches. His twin brother, Stuart, played first-class cricket
