= Daniel Britton =

English cricketer

Daniel Britton (born 25 September 1981) was an English cricketer. He was a right-handed batsman and a right-arm medium-fast bowler who played for Dorset. He was born in Salisbury, Wiltshire.

Britton played in the Minor Counties Championship for the side during the 2000 season. He made his sole List A appearance in the 2001 C&G Trophy competition, against Bedfordshire. Britton scored 0 not out and bowled seven overs in the match.

Britton played two games for Dorset in the 2001 38-County Cup.
