= Jonathan Ship =

English cricketer

Personal information
- Full name: Jonathan Andrew Ship
- Born: 23 April 1981 (age 45); West Bromwich, Staffordshire, England
- Batting: Left-handed

Domestic team information
- Years: Team
- 2001: Warwickshire Cricket Board

Career statistics
| Competition | LA |
|---|---|
| Matches | 1 |
| Runs scored | 5 |
| Batting average | 5.00 |
| 100s/50s | –/– |
| Top score | 5 |
| Balls bowled | – |
| Wickets | – |
| Bowling average | – |
| 5 wickets in innings | – |
| 10 wickets in match | – |
| Best bowling | – |
| Catches/stumpings | –/– |
- Source: Cricinfo, 25 October 2010

Jonathan Andrew Ship (born 23 April 1981) is an English cricketer. Ship is a left-handed batsman. He was born at West Bromwich, Staffordshire.

Ship represented the Warwickshire Cricket Board in a single List A match against Cumberland in the 1st round of the 2002 Cheltenham & Gloucester Trophy which was held in 2001 at St George's Road, Millom. In his only List A match, he scored 5 runs.

He currently plays club cricket for Sutton Coldfield Cricket Club.
