= Port Hills (disambiguation) =

The Port Hills are the hills between Christchurch and its port Lyttelton.

Port Hills may also refer to:

In Christchurch

- 2017 Port Hills fires, two wild fires during February of that year
- Port Hills (New Zealand electorate), one of the current electorates for the New Zealand House of Representatives
- Port Hills Fault, an inferred active seismic fault believed to be located beneath the Port Hills near Christchurch

Elsewhere

- Port Hills (Nelson), the prominent hills in Nelson, New Zealand along the coastline

== See also ==
- Porthill (disambiguation)
