= Cheam Cricket Club Ground =

Cricket ground in Cheam, London, England

Coordinates: 51.35379°N 0.22015°W

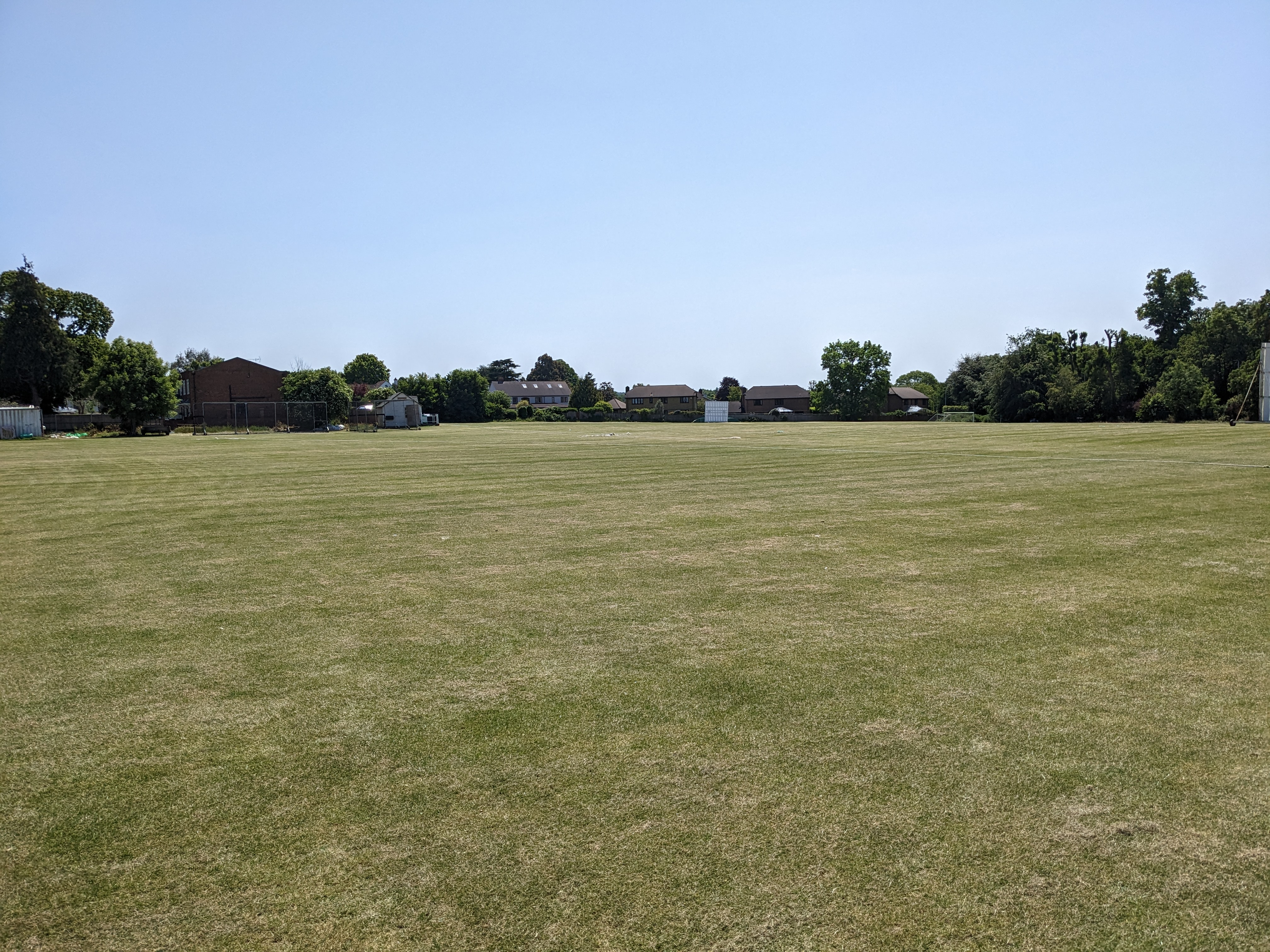

Ground information
- Location: Cheam, London
- Establishment: 1864
- Capacity: 8,000

Team information
Surrey Cricket Board	(1999 & 2001)
- As of 29 August 2010; Source: Ground profile

Cheam Cricket Club Ground is a cricket ground in Cheam, London (formerly Surrey). The first recorded match on the ground was in 1940, when Cheam played London Counties. Cheam CC was one of the founding members of the Surrey Championship and the club was established in 1864.

More recently, the ground has held Surrey Second XI matches in the Second XI Championship and the Second XI Trophy.

In 1968, the ground held a game for John Edrich against the International Cavaliers. The game attracted 8,000 people and was the first cricket match to be televised in colour by the BBC.

The Surrey Cricket Board played 2 List-A matches at the ground, the first of which came against Norfolk in the 1999 NatWest Trophy. Their second List-A match at the ground came in the 2001 Cheltenham & Gloucester Trophy against Huntingdonshire.

Today Cheam Cricket Club is an club in Surrey and has produced several first class and international players such as Mark Butcher, Alisdair Brown, Michael Burgess and Michael Carberry. For many years Cheam CC played in the Premier or Div 1 of the Surrey Championship. Internal issues led to a walk out of the 1st XI in the early 2000s with many players migrating to neighbouring clubs in Sutton and Ashtead. The club suffered hugely and had several relegations however the club recorded 4 promotions in 2019 and now plays in Div 3 of the Surrey Championship and has a thriving youth section.
