= Porthill Park =

Cricket ground in Wolstanton, Staffordshire, England

Coordinates: 53°01′43″N 2°13′08″W

Ground information
- Location: Wolstanton, Staffordshire
- Establishment: 1920 (first recorded match)

Team information
| Staffordshire | (1920-1966 & 1999-2004) |
- As of 14 August 2010; Source: Ground profile

Porthill Park, also known as the Old County Ground, is a cricket ground located in Wolstanton, Staffordshire. The first recorded match on the ground was in 1920 when Staffordshire played against Cheshire in the ground's first Minor Counties Championship match. Staffordshire utilized the ground from 1920 to 1966 and then again between 1999 and 2004. Throughout its history, the ground has hosted 45 Minor Counties Championship matches and 5 MCCA Knockout Trophy matches. The last of these matches took place in 2004 when Staffordshire played against Northumberland.

The ground has also hosted a single List-A match between Staffordshire and the Warwickshire Cricket Board in the 2001 Cheltenham & Gloucester Trophy.

In local domestic cricket, Porthill Park Cricket Club calls the ground its home. The club competes in the North Staffordshire and South Cheshire League.
