= Iain Fletcher (cricketer) =

English cricketer

Personal information
- Full name: Iain Fletcher
- Born: 31 August 1971 (age 55); Sawbridgeworth, Hertfordshire, England
- Batting: Right-handed
- Bowling: Right-arm medium-pace
- Role: Batsman

Domestic team information
- Years: Team
- 1990–2003: Hertfordshire
- 1991: Combined Universities
- 1991–1994: Somerset
- First-class debut: 28 August 1991 Somerset v Hampshire
- Last First-class: 15 August 1994 Somerset v Middlesex
- List A debut: 27 June 1990 Hertfordshire v Warwickshire
- Last List A: 28 August 2003 Hertfordshire v Ireland

Career statistics
Competition	First-class	List A
Matches	14	13
Runs scored	460	172
Batting average	24.21	13.23
100s/50s	–/5	–/1
Top score	65*	60
Balls bowled	–	38
Wickets	–	1
Bowling average	–	46.00
5 wickets in innings	–	–
10 wickets in match	–	–
Best bowling	–	1/20
Catches/stumpings	4/–	4/–
- Source: CricketArchive, 13 April 2011

Iain Fletcher (born 31 August 1971) played first-class and List A cricket for Somerset between 1991 and 1994, and Minor Counties and List A cricket over a longer period from 1990 to 2003 for Hertfordshire. He also played one List A match for the Combined Universities cricket team. He was born at Sawbridgeworth, Hertfordshire.

Educated at Millfield School and Loughborough University, Fletcher was a right-handed middle-order batsman. He played for Somerset's second eleven from 1989 and for Hertfordshire in Minor Counties cricket from 1990 and made his List A cricket debut that year, playing for Hertfordshire in the first-round NatWest Trophy match against Warwickshire. In early 1991, he played a single List A match for the Combined Universities against Northamptonshire in the Benson and Hedges Cup. Finally, at the end of the same 1991 season, he made his first-class cricket debut for his third top-class team, Somerset, scoring 56 and 2 not out against Hampshire.

Fletcher was out of first-class and List A cricket for nearly two years, and his return for Somerset, as an experimental opening batsman, proved unfortunate, as he had made 65 when his thumb was broken by the Middlesex opening bowler Neil Williams. This remained his highest first-class score. He returned to the Somerset side late in the season as a middle-order batsman, with some success, but in 1994 he played only half a dozen matches and he left the Somerset staff at the end of the season.

After leaving first-class cricket, Fletcher returned to Hertfordshire, playing in the Minor Counties competitions and in List A matches up to 2003. His highest List A score, 60, and his only wicket in either List A or first-class cricket, came in 2001 in the match against the Durham Cricket Board in the Cheltenham and Gloucester Trophy.

Since leaving cricket, Fletcher has worked as a cricket journalist for newspapers including The Independent and The Scotsman.
