= Matthew Keech =

English cricketer

Personal information
- Full name: Matthew Keech
- Born: 21 October 1970 (age 56); Hampstead, London, England
- Height: 5 ft 10 in (1.78 m)
- Batting: Right-handed
- Bowling: Right-arm medium

Domestic team information
- Years: Team
- 1991–1993: Middlesex
- 1994–1999: Hampshire
- 2001: Dorset

Career statistics
Competition	First-class	List A
Matches	69	104
Runs scored	2,824	1,900
Batting average	28.52	22.61
100s/50s	3/15	–/6
Top score	127	98
Balls bowled	810	696
Wickets	8	12
Bowling average	52.50	45.00
5 wickets in innings	–	–
10 wickets in match	–	–
Best bowling	2/28	2/16
Catches/stumpings	56/–	28/–
- Source: Cricinfo, 9 December 2009

Matthew Keech (born 21 October 1970) is an English former cricketer and cricket coach.

Keech was born at Hampstead in October 1979. He played for England Young Cricketers in both Youth Test and One Day International matches in 1989 and 1990. Keech made his debut in first-class cricket for Middlesex against Cambridge University at Fenner's in 1991, and went onto make fourteen appearances in that seasons County Championship. In that same season, he also made his debut in List A one-day cricket against Surrey in the Refuge Assurance League, with him making fourteen one-day appearances in 1991. He did not appear for Middlesex in 1992, but did return to the side for the 1993 season; during this, he made five first-class and fifteen one-day appearances. Keech left Middlesex at the end of that season, with Mark Ramprakash putting this down to a feeling that he would do better playing elsewhere.

For the 1994 season, Keech joined Hampshire, making five appearances in the County Championship and twelve in one-day cricket during his debut season.

Keech played in 49 first-class matches and 74 one-day matches for the county. At the end of the 1999 season, Keech was released by Hampshire. In 2001, he made a single one-day appearance for Dorset against Bedfordshire at Bournemouth in the 2nd round of the Cheltenham & Gloucester Trophy; he scored 73 runs in the match in a losing cause. Keech subsequently coached Dorset.
