= Paul Bates (cricketer) =

English cricketer

Personal information
- Full name: Paul Robert Bates
- Born: 9 May 1974 (age 52); Chippenham, Wiltshire, England
- Batting: Right-handed
- Bowling: Right-arm medium-fast
- Relatives: Richard Bates (brother)

Domestic team information
- Years: Team
- 2000–2002: Wiltshire

Career statistics
Competition	LA
Matches	2
Runs scored	18
Batting average	9.00
100s/50s	–/–
Top score	18
Balls bowled	–
Wickets	–
Bowling average	–
5 wickets in innings	–
10 wickets in match	–
Best bowling	–
Catches/stumpings	–/–
- Source: Cricinfo, 9 October 2010

Paul Robert Bates (born 9 May 1974) is a former English cricketer. Bates was a right-handed batsman who bowled right-arm medium-fast. He was born at Chippenham, Wiltshire.

Bates made his Minor Counties Championship debut for Wiltshire against Oxfordshire in 2000. From 2000 to 2002, he represented the county in 8 Minor Counties Championship matches, the last of which came against Cheshire in 2002. Bates also represented Wiltshire in the MCCA Knockout Trophy. His debut in that competition came against the Gloucestershire Cricket Board in 2000. He played one further Trophy match in 2000 against Cornwall and played his final Trophy match in 2002 against Devon.

Bates also represented Wiltshire in 2 List-A matches. His List-A debut for the county came against the Derbyshire Cricket Board in the 2001 Cheltenham & Gloucester Trophy. His second and final List-A game came against Ireland in the 1st round of 2002 Cheltenham & Gloucester Trophy which was played in 2001. In his 2 List-A matches, he scored 18 runs at a batting average of 9.00, with a high score of 18.

== Family ==
His brother Richard has also represented Wiltshire in List-A and Minor Counties cricket.
