= Lyndon Jones (cricketer) =

Welsh cricketer (born 1976)

Personal information
- Full name: Lyndon Owain Jones
- Born: 8 November 1976 (age 50); Newport, Monmouthshire, Wales
- Batting: Right-handed
- Bowling: Right-arm off break

Domestic team information
- Years: Team
- 1997–2003: Wales Minor Counties

Career statistics
Competition	LA
Matches	5
Runs scored	51
Batting average	12.75
100s/50s	–/–
Top score	38
Balls bowled	210
Wickets	7
Bowling average	23.57
5 wickets in innings	–
10 wickets in match	–
Best bowling	2/11
Catches/stumpings	3/–
- Source: Cricinfo, 1 January 2011

Lyndon Owain Jones (born 8 November 1976) is a Welsh cricketer. Jones is a right-handed batsman who bowls right-arm off break. He was born at Newport, Monmouthshire.

Jones made his Minor Counties Championship debut for Wales Minor Counties in 1997 against Wiltshire. From 1997 to 2003, he represented the team in 26 Championship matches, the last of which came against Devon. His MCCA Knockout Trophy debut for the team came in 1999 against the Warwickshire Cricket Board. From 1999 to 2003 he represented the team in 10 Trophy matches, the last of which came against Hertfordshire. His debut List A appearance for the team came in the 2nd round of the 2000 NatWest Trophy against the Oxfordshire. From 1999 to 2002, he represented the team in 5 List A matches, the last of which came against Cornwall in the 2nd round of the 2003 Cheltenham & Gloucester Trophy which was held in 2002. In his 5 matches, he scored 51 runs at a batting average of 12.75, with a high score of 38. With the ball he took 7 wickets at a bowling average of 23.57, with best figures of 2/11.

He previously played Second XI cricket for the Glamorgan Second XI and Northamptonshire Second XI.
