= Luke List (cricketer) =

English cricketer

Personal information
- Full name: Luke Robert John List
- Born: 15 February 1977 (age 49); Banbury, Oxfordshire, England
- Batting: Right-handed
- Bowling: Right-arm medium pace

Domestic team information
- Years: Team
- 1994–2001: Oxfordshire

Career statistics
Competition	List A
Matches	4
Runs scored	20
Batting average	6.66
100s/50s	–/–
Top score	10
Balls bowled	147
Wickets	2
Bowling average	52.00
5 wickets in innings	–
10 wickets in match	–
Best bowling	1/24
Catches/stumpings	1/–
- Source: Cricinfo, 20 May 2011

Luke Robert John List (born 15 February 1977) is a former English cricketer. List was a right-handed batsman who bowled right-arm medium pace. He was born in Banbury, Oxfordshire.

List made his debut for Oxfordshire in the 1994 Minor Counties Championship against Cornwall. List played Minor counties cricket for Oxfordshire from 1994 to 2001, which included 22 Minor Counties Championship matches and 7 MCCA Knockout Trophy matches. He made his List A debut against the Durham Cricket Board in the 1999 NatWest Trophy. He played 3 further List A matches, the last coming against Shropshire in the 2nd round of the 2002 Cheltenham & Gloucester Trophy which was held in 2001. In his 4 List A matches he scored 20 runs at a batting average of 6.66, with a high score of 10. With the ball, he took 2 wickets at a bowling average of 54.00, with best figures of 1/24.
