= Neil Humphrey =

Jamaican cricketer (born 1973)

Personal information
- Full name: Neil Victor Humphrey
- Born: 2 April 1973 (age 53); Kingston, Surrey County, Jamaica
- Batting: Right-handed

Domestic team information
- Years: Team
- 2001-2002: Warwickshire Cricket Board

Career statistics
Competition	LA
Matches	5
Runs scored	128
Batting average	25.60
100s/50s	–/1
Top score	58
Balls bowled	–
Wickets	–
Bowling average	–
5 wickets in innings	–
10 wickets in match	–
Best bowling	–
Catches/stumpings	–/–
- Source: Cricinfo, 25 October 2010

Neil Victor Humphrey (born 2 April 1973) is a former Jamaican cricketer. Humphrey was a right-handed batsman. He was born at Kingston, Surrey County, Jamaica.

Humphrey represented the Warwickshire Cricket Board in List A cricket. His debut List A match came against the Leicestershire Cricket Board in the 2001 Cheltenham & Gloucester Trophy. From 2001 to 2002, he represented the Board in 5 matches, the last of which came against Leicestershire in the 2002 Cheltenham & Gloucester Trophy. In his 5 List A matches, he scored 128 runs at a batting average of 25.60, with a single half century high score of 58.
