= Richard Bates (Nottinghamshire cricketer) =

English cricketer (born 1972)

Personal information
- Full name: Richard Terry Bates
- Born: 17 June 1972 (age 54); Stamford, Lincolnshire, England
- Nickname: Blaster, Blast, Batesy, Roland
- Batting: Right-handed
- Bowling: Right-arm off break
- Relatives: Paul Bates (brother)

Domestic team information
- Years: Team
- 2002: Nottinghamshire Cricket Board
- 1993–1999: Nottinghamshire
- 1990–1991: Lincolnshire

Career statistics
Competition	FC	LA
Matches	33	71
Runs scored	450	240
Batting average	12.50	8.27
100s/50s	–/–	–/–
Top score	34	28*
Balls bowled	4,879	2,714
Wickets	50	63
Bowling average	50.40	34.55
5 wickets in innings	1	–
10 wickets in match	–	–
Best bowling	5/88	3/21
Catches/stumpings	18/–	29/–
- Source: Cricinfo, 22 November 2010

Richard Terry Bates (born 17 June 1972) is a former English cricketer. Bates was a right-handed batsman who bowled right-arm off break. He was born in Stamford, Lincolnshire.

== Cricket career ==
Bates was a junior at Bourne CC and a made his debut in county cricket for Lincolnshire in the Minor Counties Championship against Bedfordshire in 1990. Bates played 2 further Championship matches for the county, against Hertfordshire in 1990 and Cumberland in 2006. He played 3 matches for the county in the MCCA Knockout Trophy: Twice against Suffolk and once against Devon. Bates made his debut in List A cricket for Lincolnshire in the 1990 NatWest Trophy against Gloucestershire.

In 1993, he made his debut in first-class cricket for Nottinghamshire against Oxford University. From 1993 to 1999, he represented the county in 33 first-class matches, the last of which came against Northamptonshire. In his 33 first-class matches, he scored 450 runs at an average of 12.50, with a high score of 34, while in the field he took 18 catches. With the ball he took 50 wickets at a bowling average of 50.40, with a single five wicket haul which gave him best figures of 5/88.

It was in List A cricket that Bates played the majority of his cricket for Nottinghamshire. From 1993 to 1999, he represented the county in 69 matches, the last of which came against Somerset. During his List A playing span with Nottinghamshire, he scored 234 runs at an average of 8.66, with a high score of 28*, while in the field he took 29 catches. With the ball he took 63 wickets at a bowling average of 34.07, with best figures of 3/21.

In 2002, he represented the Nottinghamshire Cricket Board in a single List A match against Cumberland in the 1st round of the 2003 Cheltenham & Gloucester Trophy which was played in 2002.

== Coaching career ==
Bates was appointed the coach of the England women's cricket team in 2003. He held the position for 4 years, during which he aided them in regaining the Women's Ashes in 2005. He quit the job in April 2007 and subsequently moved with his family to Australia.
