= Maurie Gear =

Australian rules footballer

Personal information
- Full name: Maurie Gear
- Born: 18 November 1934
- Died: 29 December 1988 (aged 54)
- Original teams: Newtown and Chilwell
- Height: 170 cm (5 ft 7 in)
- Weight: 68 kg (150 lb)

Playing career^{1}
Years	Club	Games (Goals)
1954	Geelong	2 (0)
- ^{1} Playing statistics correct to the end of 1954.

Maurie Gear (18 November 1934 – 29 December 1988) was an Australian rules footballer who played with Geelong in the Victorian Football League (VFL).
