= David Towse =

English cricketer (born 1968)

Anthony David Towse (born 22 April 1968 in Bridlington, East Riding of Yorkshire, England) is an English former first-class cricketer, who played one first-class match for Yorkshire County Cricket Club in 1988. He has also appeared in one day cricket for Lincolnshire in one game, and in eleven matches for the Wales Minor Counties.

A right arm medium fast bowler, Towse took three first-class wickets for Yorkshire at 16.66 in his match against Cambridge University, with a best spell of 2 for 26. In 12 one day matches, from 1996 to 2004, he took nineteen wickets at 18.84, with a best of 3 for 19. A left-handed batsman, he scored 144 one day runs at 20.57, with a highest score of 30 not out.

Towse latterly played club cricket in North Yorkshire for Thirsk C.C., whom he captained to the Division One title in 2006, in the York and District Senior League.
