= Adam Smith (YouTuber) =

English doctor and former YouTuber

- Occupation: Doctor

YouTube information
- Channel: Doc Adam
- Years active: 2017–2021; 2023–present
- Genre: Health
- Subscribers: 2.04 million
- Views: 103.1 million
- Last updated: 5 May 2023

Adam Smith, better known as Doc Adam, is a British-Australian medical doctor and YouTuber who produced medical advice videos for a Filipino audience. He retired his YouTube channel in 2021.

== YouTube career ==
=== Content ===
Adam Smith is an Australia-based doctor from England who ran a YouTube channel under the name "Doc Adam". He started making videos on medical advice with the help of his Filipino partner in 2017. A Filipino-speaker himself, Smith catered to a Filipino audience. Smith used to visit the Philippines through medical missions, and as a result he learned how to speak Filipino. He then shifted to reviewing products which were endorsed by celebrities, as well as politicians making unproven medical claims. He also ran an online shop where he sold health products, mostly low-carb and low-sugar food staples as well as Doc Adam branded merchandise.

=== On Farrah Agustin-Bunch's claims ===
In late 2020, Farrah Agustin-Bunch, a fellow doctor and head of GlutaLipo, sued Smith after he disputed the brand's slimming and whitening claims. Smith also disputed Agustin-Bunch's natural or alternative medicine practices and questioned her training background at Harvard University. Among the other products of Agustin-Bunch previously covered by Smith are Boston C and Pixie Dust magnesium. This led to Smith's hiatus from YouTube from October to November 2020, and October 2021 to February 2023.

=== CopperMask PH ===
In early 2021, Smith made a video about CopperMask PH's copper mask which is distributed by JC Premiere where he criticized the hole in the chin region. He explained that such mask are not recommended by Philippine and Australian health authorities. Smith said that he had received cease and desist order for his video from CopperMask PH who believes that Smith is "defaming" the brand.

=== Hiatus, return and lawsuit with Agustin-Bunch ===
Smith took a hiatus from YouTube on 30 October 2021, to take a "different direction in life" after his lawsuit with Bunch-Agustin disrupted his professional practice as a doctor and incurred heavy legal cost. Smith would start a crowdfunding campaign since his indemnity insurer won't cover the cost of his case.

On 6 February 2023, Smith announced that he would file a defense lawsuit against Agustin-Bunch using evidence he had accumulated. He accused Agustin-Bunch of discouraging patients from undergoing traditional cancer treatment programs to promote her own products, leading to their deaths; he also accused another doctor of humiliating Smith by instructing someone to deliver him court papers of the case against him in his clinic during working hours. The delivery was filmed and uploaded to social media. Agustin-Bunch's side maintained that Smith has defamed her through his videos.

He would upload a video on YouTube on 22 February 2023, marking the end of his hiatus, where he discussed updates on his lawsuit.In a pre-trial judgment, a judge representing the Supreme Court of Victoria, Justice John Dixon, rejected the majority of the claims in Agustin-Bunch's filing, stating that most imputations in the videos ‘are expressions of opinion’.

== Personal life ==
Smith is in a relationship with KC, a Filipino woman. When he announced his retirement from YouTube in 2021, Smith said that they planned to get married the following year. However, the two did not go through with it as of February 2023 due to Smith suffering from anxiety and depression caused by the Agustin-Bunch lawsuit.

In 2024, he started an altercation with a known hip-hop celebrity Mark Jayson Warnakulahewa, also known as "Makagago Wazzup Man", to defend a YouTuber named "Nico David". The results of this altercation are still unknown.
