= Matthew Smith (cricketer) =

English cricketer

Matthew Smith (born 29April 1977) is an English cricketer. He is a right-handed batsman and a Righ-Arm off-break bowler who has played for Hertfordshire. He was born in Harrow.

Smith, who made his Minor Counties Championship debut for the team during the 2000 season, made two List A appearances in the C&G Trophy in 2001. He scored 5 runs and took figures of 3–43 on his debut, and in his second match scored 18 runs, taking figures of 0–35.
