= Ben Trott (cricketer) =

English cricketer

Personal information
- Full name: Benjamin James Trott
- Born: 14 March 1975 (age 51); Wellington, Somerset, England
- Batting: Right-handed
- Bowling: Right arm fast-medium
- Role: Bowler

Domestic team information
- Years: Team
- 1997–1998: Somerset
- 2000–2004: Kent

Career statistics
| Competition | FC | LA | T20 |
|---|---|---|---|
| Matches | 34 | 42 | 7 |
| Runs scored | 150 | 15 | 10 |
| Batting average | 5.76 | 1.87 | – |
| 100s/50s | 0/0 | 0/0 | 0/0 |
| Top score | 26 | 3* | 5* |
| Balls bowled | 4,922 | 1,911 | 162 |
| Wickets | 88 | 54 | 6 |
| Bowling average | 34.07 | 27.75 | 36.66 |
| 5 wickets in innings | 4 | 1 | 0 |
| 10 wickets in match | 1 | 0 | 0 |
| Best bowling | 6/13 | 5/18 | 2/17 |
| Catches/stumpings | 8/– | 7/– | 2/– |
- Source: CricInfo, 14 July 2008

Benjamin James Trott (born 14 March 1975) is a former English professional cricketer. Primarily a bowler, Trott was born at Wellington, Somerset and began his career with Somerset County Cricket Club but played most of his top-class cricket for Kent County Cricket Club.

Trott made his first-class cricket debut for Somerset at the beginning of the 1997 season, having first played for the Second XI in 1995. He made only four senior appearances for the county before being released and working as a clark at Somerset County Council. He has a degree in Physical Education and Information Technology and qualified as a primary school teacher before being signed by Kent ahead of the 2001 season.

Trott made his Kent debut in July 2000 in the County Championship and went on to play, primarily as an opening bowler, for the county for five seasons. He Trott retired as a professional in December 2004 to become the manager of the club's study support centre. He left this post in 2006 to set up his own sports coaching and fitness training business before working for Kent Sport at the University of Kent as Assistant Operations Director.

Trott has played Kent Cricket League cricket for a number of teams and plays golf.
