= Mark Hodgkiss =

English cricketer

Personal information
- Full name: Mark Anthony Hodgkiss
- Born: 10 January 1977 (age 49); West Bromwich, England
- Nickname: Hodge
- Height: 6 ft 3 in (1.91 m)
- Batting: Right-handed
- Bowling: Right Arm Medium Fast

Domestic team information
- Years: Team
- 2001: Worcestershire Cricket Board

Career statistics
| Competition | LA |
|---|---|
| Matches | 2 |
| Runs scored | 48 |
| Batting average | – |
| 100s/50s | –/– |
| Top score | 48* |
| Balls bowled | 81 |
| Wickets | 3 |
| Bowling average | 9.33 |
| 5 wickets in innings | – |
| 10 wickets in match | – |
| Best bowling | 3/16 |
| Catches/stumpings | –/– |
- Source: Cricinfo, 2 November 2010

Mark Anthony Hodgkiss (born 10 January 1977) is a former English cricketer. Hodgkiss was a right-handed batsman. He was born in West Bromwich, West Midlands.

Hodgkiss represented the Worcestershire Cricket Board in 2 List A matches against Staffordshire and Cumberland in the 2001 Cheltenham & Gloucester Trophy. In his 2 List A matches, he batted once, scoring 48*. With the ball he took 3 wickets at a bowling average of 9.33, with best figures of 3/16.
