= Russell Jones (English cricketer) =

English cricketer (born 1980)

Russell Jones (born 21 September 1980) was an English cricketer. He was a right-handed batsman and right-arm medium-pace bowler who played for Devon. He was born in Taunton.

Having represented Devon in the 38-County Cup and Somerset Second XI in the Second XI Championship and AON Risks Trophy between 1999 and 2002, Jones made his Devon debut in the Minor Counties Championship in 1999.

Jones made a single List A appearance for the team, during the 2001 season, against Shropshire. He did not bat in the match, but bowled 10 overs, taking figures of 2–38.
