= The Avenue Sports Club Ground =

Cricket ground in March, Cambridgeshire, England

Coordinates: 52°32′37″N 0°04′54″E

Ground information
- Location: March, Cambridgeshire
- Country: England
- Establishment: 1939

Team information
| Cambridgeshire | (1939–present) |
- As of 30 May 2010; Source: Ground profile

The Avenue Sports Club Ground is a cricket ground in March, Cambridgeshire. The ground was established in 1939, when Cambridgeshire played Suffolk in the grounds first Minor Counties Championship match. From 1935 to the present day, it has hosted 69 Minor Counties matches.

The first List-A match played on the ground came in the 1975 Gillette Cup between Cambridgeshire and Northamptonshire. From 1975 to 2003, the ground played host to 10 List-A matches, the last of which saw Cambridgeshire play Yorkshire in the 2003 Cheltenham & Gloucester Trophy.

In local domestic cricket, The Avenue Sports Club Ground is the home ground of the March Town Cricket Club who play in the Cambridgeshire & Huntingdonshire Premier League Division 1 and Rutland League Division 2.
