= Gary Fellows =

English cricketer (born 1978)

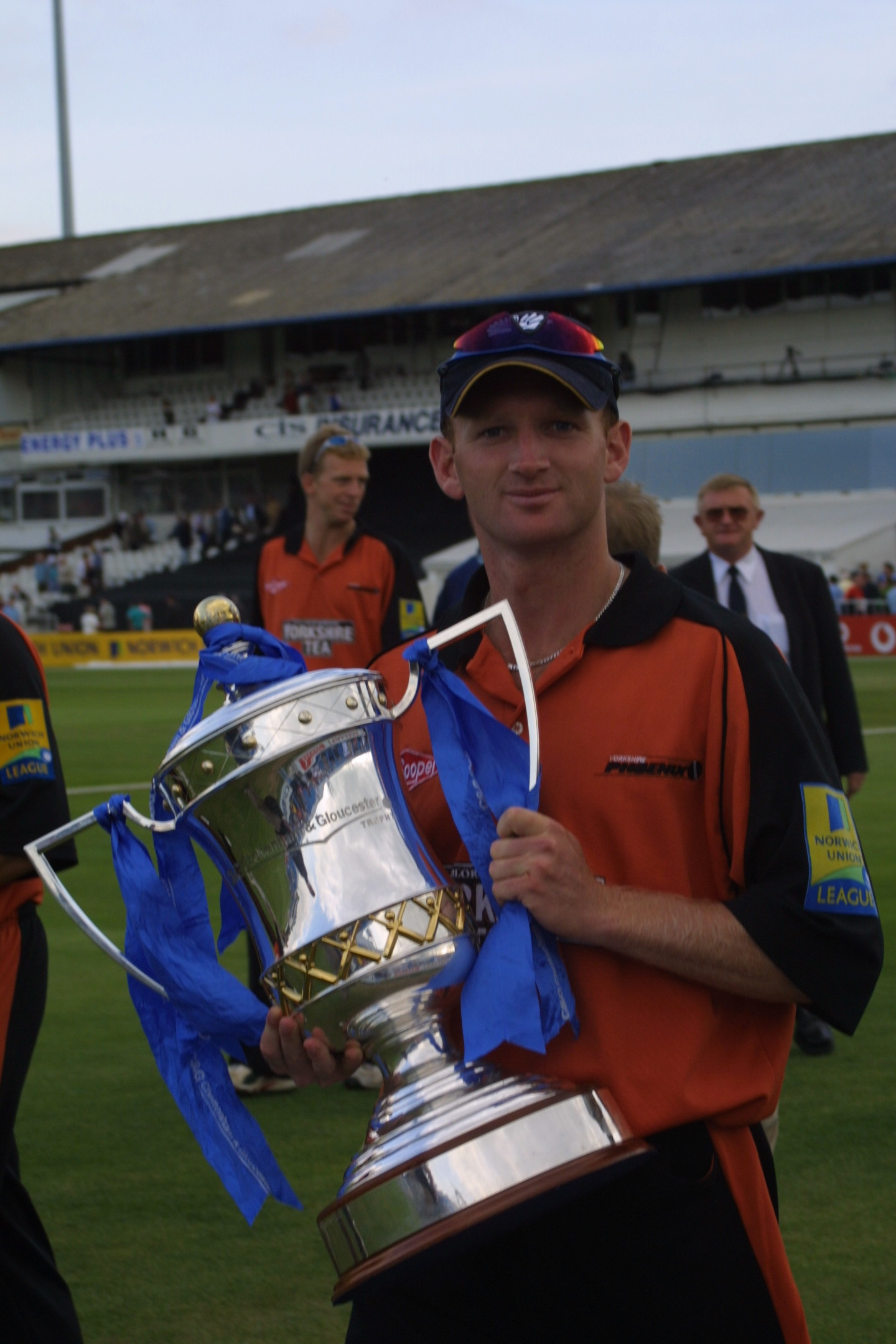

Personal information
- Full name: Gary Matthew Fellows
- Born: 30 July 1978 (age 48); Halifax, Yorkshire, England
- Batting: Right-handed
- Bowling: Right-arm medium

Domestic team information
- Years: Team
- 1996/97: Matabeleland
- 1998–2003: Yorkshire
- 2005: Shropshire

Career statistics
Competition	First-class	List A
Matches	48	96
Runs scored	1,592	1,350
Batting average	23.41	20.76
100s/50s	1/6	0/6
Top score	109	80*
Balls bowled	2,393	974
Wickets	32	23
Bowling average	38.37	37.04
5 wickets in innings	0	0
10 wickets in match	0	0
Best bowling	3/23	4/19
Catches/stumpings	23/–	28/–
- Source: Cricinfo, 16 June 2010

Gary Matthew Fellows (born 30 July 1978,) is a former first-class cricketer, who played for Yorkshire County Cricket Club.

Fellows played as a right-handed batsman and right arm medium pace bowler, who played regularly for Yorkshire from 1998 to 2003 in first-class cricket, and into 2005 in the one day game. A bustling, busy player he scored 1,592 runs at 23.41, with a highest score of 109, and he took 32 wickets at 38.37, with a best of 3 for 23. He played 96 List A one-day matches for the Tykes, scoring 1,350 runs at 20.76, with a top of 80 not out, and taking 23 wickets at just over 37.

He began his cricket at the Illingworth C.C. in the Airedale-Wharfedale Senior Cricket League and played Minor Counties Championship cricket for Shropshire.

He now plays where he started his cricket journey at Illingworth St. Mary's in the Halifax cricket league.
