= Adam Smith (tenor) =

British operatic tenor

Adam Smith is a British operatic tenor. He was a member of the ensemble at Opera Ballet Vlaanderen in Antwerp from 2014 to 2017. Smith is known for his interpretation of roles such as Don José in Carmen at the Royal Opera House, Cavaradossi in Tosca at the Staatsoper Hamburg, and Roméo in Roméo et Juliette at Washington National Opera.

== Life and career ==
Born in Northern England, Smith began his musical studies as a child, studying violin, and playing in youth orchestras. He began his vocal studies at eighteen and studied singing at the Royal Northern College of Music and went on to gain a Master of Music with Distinction at the Guildhall School of Music, as well as completing their International Opera Course.

In 2014, he joined the Young Artist programme at Opera Ballet Vlaanderen in Antwerp where he appeared in several roles including performed the roles of Ein junger Diener in Elektra, Basilio & Don Curzio in Le Nozze di Figaro, Walther von der Vogelweide in Tannhäuser, Eustazio in Armida, Cassio in Otello, Steuerman in Wagner's Der fliegende Holländer and as the Indian singer in Rimsky-Korsakov's Sadko.

2020 saw Smith perform Rodolfo in La bohème with Opera Carolina, as well Pinkerton in Madama Butterfly with English National Opera.

In the 2025-2026 season, Smith sang Radamès in Aida at Washington National Opera, made his debut at the Opéra national de Paris as Cavaradossi in Tosca, and returned to the role of Julien in Charpentier's Louise at the Opéra National de Lyon. In 2026, he made his Metropolitan Opera debut as Pinkerton in Madama Butterfly, followed by Rodolofo in La bohème. He also made debuts at the Latvian National Opera as Turiddu in Cavalleria rusticana, the Arena di Verona as Alredo in La traviata, and the Puccini Festival as Cavaradossi in Tosca.

== Roles ==
Bizet: Don José in Carmen; Charpentier: Julien in Louise; Dvořák: The Prince in Rusalka; Gounod: Roméo in Roméo et Juliette; Janáček: Boris in Kát'a Kabanová; Mascagni: Turridu in Cavalleria Rusticana; Offenbach: Hoffmann in Les contes d'Hoffmann	Puccini: Rodolfo in La bohème; Pinkerton in Madama Butterfly; Cavaradossi in Tosca; Rinuccio in Gianni Schicchi; Luigi in Il tabarro; Verdi: The Duke of Mantua in Rigoletto; Radames in Aida; Alfredo Germont in La Traviata; Wagner: Eric in Der fliegende Holländer

== Awards ==
- 2015: Ferruccio Tagliavini International Singing Competition, "The Best Tenor", First Prize, Audience Prize, Critics’ Prize
- 2015: Ada Sari International Singing Competition, Third Prize
- 2016: International Moniuszko Vocal Competition, Finalist
