= Michael Gear =

Michael Gear may refer to:

- Michael Gear (bishop) (1934–2018), English bishop
- Michael Gear (cricketer) (born 1945), English cricketer
- W. Michael Gear (born 1955), American writer
