= Simon Gear =

English cricketer

Personal information
- Full name: Simon Gear
- Born: 2 October 1974 (age 52); Pembury, Kent, England
- Batting: Right-handed

Domestic team information
- Years: Team
- 2000: Warwickshire Cricket Board

Career statistics
Competition	LA
Matches	1
Runs scored	27
Batting average	27.00
100s/50s	–/–
Top score	27
Balls bowled	–
Wickets	–
Bowling average	–
5 wickets in innings	–
10 wickets in match	–
Best bowling	–
Catches/stumpings	1/–
- Source: Cricinfo, 26 October 2010

Simon Gear (born 2 October 1974) is an English cricketer. Gear is a right-handed batsman. He was born at Pembury, Kent.

Gear represented the Warwickshire Cricket Board in a single List A match against the Kent Cricket Board in the 2000 NatWest Trophy. In his only List A match, he scored 27 runs and took a single catch in the field.

He currently plays club cricket for Barby Cricket Club.
