= Paul Lazenbury =

English cricketer (born 1978)

Paul Stuart Lazenbury (born 10 August 1978) is an English cricketer. He was a left-handed batsman and a leg-break bowler. He played List A cricket for Gloucestershire Cricket Board and Kent Cricket Board, and for Herefordshire.

Lazenbury played six one-day matches in his career, and also played second eleven cricket for several counties for six years from 1995. But he did not appear in first-class cricket.
