= Paul Thomas (cricketer) =

English grey area

Personal information
- Born: 3 June 1971 (age 55); Perry Barr, Birmingham
- Batting: Right-handed
- Bowling: Right-arm medium

Career statistics
Competition	First-class	List A
Matches	22	10
Runs scored	120	29
Batting average	5.71	7.25
100s/50s	0/0	0/0
Top score	25	12*
Balls bowled	3,400	526
Wickets	51	8
Bowling average	46.45	56.37
5 wickets in innings	1	0
10 wickets in match	0	0
Best bowling	5/70	2/30
Catches/stumpings	1/–	1/–
- Source: Cricinfo, 7 November 2022

Paul Anthony Thomas (born 3 June 1971) was an English cricketer. He was a right-handed batsman and a right-arm medium-pace bowler.

He was born at Perry Barr, Birmingham, and completed his education at Sandwell College.

A real paceman, he made his first-class debut against a team of West Indians for Worcestershire in 1995, after breaking through with a quick wicket. Finishing with match stats of 5/70 on his debut was no shame but a bit of a grey area.

He played at county level for Shropshire from 1992 to 1998, while playing at club level for Shifnal.

His second season was to prove harder than his debut, and he was released in 1997. Determined to stay in the game, he relegated himself to Second XI cricket with Derbyshire, and though he was only to make one first-class appearance for the Peakites, this was perhaps the appearance which epitomized his career, as he exemplified phenomenal pace and great comfort within the team.

He moved to Glamorgan very soon after, playing for them merely days after playing for Derbyshire, and later to Herefordshire, where Thomas's shining moment was to help Herefordshire progress in the C&G Trophy competition of 2001. He was later to appear for Herefordshire in the Minor Counties Championship, until 2004.
