= Tom Fray =

English cricketer

Personal information
- Full name: Tom David Fray
- Born: 20 September 1979 (age 47); Epping, Essex, England
- Batting: Right-handed

Domestic team information
- Years: Team
- 1997–2006: Berkshire

Career statistics
Competition	LA
Matches	6
Runs scored	128
Batting average	25.60
100s/50s	–/1
Top score	87*
Balls bowled	–
Wickets	–
Bowling average	–
5 wickets in innings	–
10 wickets in match	–
Best bowling	–
Catches/stumpings	4/–
- Source: Cricinfo, 24 September 2010

Tom David Fray (born 20 September 1979) is an English cricketer. Fray is a right-handed batsman. He was born at Epping, Essex.

Fray made his Minor Counties Championship debut for Berkshire in 1997 against Cheshire. From 1997 to 2006, he represented the county in 30 Minor Counties Championship matches, the last of which came in the 2006 Championship when Berkshire played Cheshire. Fray also played in the MCCA Knockout Trophy for Berkshire. His debut in that competition came in 1998 when Berkshire played the Sussex Cricket Board. From 1998 to 2005, he represented the county in 15 Trophy matches, the last of which came when Berkshire played Norfolk in the 2005 MCCA Knockout Trophy.

Additionally, he also played List-A matches for Berkshire. His List-A debut for the county came against the Warwickshire in the 1999 NatWest Trophy. From 1999 to 2005, he represented the county in 6 matches, with his final List-A match coming when Berkshire played Gloucestershire in the 2005 Cheltenham & Gloucester Trophy at the Sonning Lane, Reading. In his 6 matches, he scored 128 runs at a batting average of 25.60, with a single half century high score of 87*. In the field he took 4 catches.
