= Nicholas Hatch =

English cricketer (born 1979)

Personal information
- Full name: Nicholas Guy Hatch
- Born: 21 April 1979 (age 47); Darlington, County Durham
- Height: 203 cm (6 ft 8 in)
- Batting: Right-handed
- Bowling: Right-arm medium
- Role: Bowler

Domestic team information
- Years: Team
- 2001–2003: Durham

Career statistics
Competition	First-class	List A
Matches	18	13
Runs scored	157	44
Batting average	12.07	14.66
100s/50s	0/0	0/0
Top score	24	20*
Balls bowled	3,133	582
Wickets	48	15
Bowling average	37.39	30.66
5 wickets in innings	0	0
10 wickets in match	0	0
Best bowling	4/61	3/26
Catches/stumpings	4/–	2/–
- Source: ESPNcricinfo, 15 December 2012

Nicholas Hatch (born 21 April 1979) is a former English cricketer. He played as a right-handed batsman and a right-arm medium-fast bowler for Durham County Cricket Club between 2001 and 2003. He was born in Darlington.

Hatch's Second XI career began in 1998, a season in which he played two matches for Durham, taking two wickets in his first. He continued in the Second XI for nearly three years before making the step up to first-class cricket, where he debuted in June 2001. Though he took three wickets on his debut, he also achieved a golden duck in a defeat did nothing to aid Durham's final season placing of eighth in the Division Two table.

Thanks to his tailend position and high batting average, Hatch finished not out in eight of the sixteen innings he played during his debut first-class season. During 2002 he played very infrequently, as Durham finished rock bottom of Division Two, though they slightly improved their position in the following season.

Hatch exited the first-class game in 2003. Hatch later played for the Second XI teams of Leicestershire, Derbyshire and Essex. Hatch was a tailendg batsman and a moderately successful bowler in both the long and short form of the game.
