= Adam Smyth =

English cricketer

Personal information
- Full name: Adam Charles Smyth
- Born: 16 May 1981 (age 45); Coventry, Warwickshire, England
- Batting: Right-handed
- Bowling: Right-arm medium

Domestic team information
- Years: Team
- 2000: Warwickshire Cricket Board

Career statistics
Competition	List A
Matches	1
Runs scored	21
Batting average	21.00
100s/50s	0/0
Top score	21
Balls bowled	12
Wickets	1
Bowling average	32.00
5 wickets in innings	0
10 wickets in match	0
Best bowling	1/32
Catches/stumpings	0/–
- Source: Cricinfo, 25 October 2010

Adam Charles Smyth (born 16 May 1981) is an English cricketer. Smyth is a right-handed batsman who bowls right-arm medium pace. He was born at Coventry, Warwickshire.

Smyth represented the Warwickshire Cricket Board in a single List A match against the Kent Cricket Board in the 2000 NatWest Trophy. In his only List A match, he scored 21 runs, while with the ball he took a single wicket at a cost of 32 runs.

He currently plays club cricket for Kenilworth Wardens Cricket Club in the Birmingham and District Premier League.
