= Walter Gear =

UK-based astrophysicist

Walter K Gear FLSW is an astrophysicist, professor of physics and head of the School of Physics and Astronomy at Cardiff University. His research focuses on star formation in galaxies.

Gear completed a BSc and PhD at Queen Mary, University of London, before working at the Royal Observatory Edinburgh, managing the construction of the SCUBA camera for the James Clerk Maxwell Telescope in Hawaii. He has been in Cardiff since 1999, where he established and leads the Astronomy Instrumentation Group. He has been Head of School since 2005. Gear was involved in the QUaD CMB Polarization experiment. In 2012, Gear was elected a Fellow of the Learned Society of Wales.
