= Richard Bates (Wiltshire cricketer) =

English cricketer (born 1972)

Personal information
- Full name: Richard John Bates
- Born: 2 March 1972 (age 54); Chippenham, Wiltshire, England
- Batting: Left-handed
- Bowling: Slow left-arm orthodox

Domestic team information
- Years: Team
- 1997–2005: Wiltshire

Career statistics
Competition	LA
Matches	9
Runs scored	101
Batting average	12.62
100s/50s	–/–
Top score	24
Balls bowled	416
Wickets	11
Bowling average	34.36
5 wickets in innings	–
10 wickets in match	–
Best bowling	3/16
Catches/stumpings	6/–
- Source: Cricinfo, 9 October 2010

Richard John Bates (born 2 March 1972) is a former English cricketer. Bates was a left-handed batsman who bowled slow left-arm orthodox. He was born at Chippenham, Wiltshire.

Bates made his Minor Counties Championship debut for Wiltshire against Cheshire in 1997. From 1997 to 2004, he represented the county in 48 Minor Counties Championship matches, the last of which came against Cornwall. Bates also represented Wiltshire in the MCCA Knockout Trophy. His debut in that competition came against Norfolk in 1997. From 1997 to 2004, he represented Wiltshire in 19 Trophy matches, the last of which came against Northumberland.

Bates also represented Wiltshire in List-A cricket. His List-A debut for the county came against the Northamptonshire Cricket Board in the 1999 NatWest Trophy. From 1999 to 2005, he represented the county in 9 matches, the last of which came against Kent in the 2005 Cheltenham & Gloucester Trophy. In his 9 List-A matches, he scored 101 runs at a batting average of 12.62, with a high score of 24. With the ball he took 11 wickets at a bowling average of 34.36, with best figures of 3/16.

== Family ==
His brother Paul has also represented Wiltshire in List-A and Minor Counties cricket.
