= Ernest Pass Memorial Ground =

Cricket stadium in Barrow-in-Furness, England

Coordinates: 54.13467°N 3.20821°W

Ground information
- Location: Barrow-in-Furness, Cumbria
- Establishment: 1937 (first recorded match)

Team information
Cumberland	(1984–present)
- As of 5 September 2010; Source: Ground profile

Ernest Pass Memorial Ground is a cricket ground in Barrow-in-Furness, Cumbria (formerly Lancashire). Prior to 1937, the ground was known as Monk's Croft. The first recorded match on the ground was in 1937, when the Lancashire Second XI played Durham in the Minor Counties Championship. The Lancashire Second XI used the ground on 4 occasions in Minor counties cricket.

Cumberland first used the ground in the Minor Counties Championship when it played Northumberland in 1984. From 1984 to present, the ground has hosted 22 Minor Counties Championship matches for Cumberland and 2 MCCA Knockout Trophy matches.

The ground has hosted 2 List-A matches, the first of which saw Cumberland play Northamptonshire in the 1997 NatWest Trophy. The second List-A match played on there saw Cumberland play Kent in the 2001 Cheltenham & Gloucester Trophy 3rd round. The home county lost both of these matches against their professional, first-class opponents.

In local domestic cricket, Ernest Pass Memorial Ground is the home ground of Barrow Cricket Club. who play in the Northern Premier Cricket League.
