= Mark Gilliver =

English cricketer

Personal information
- Full name: Mark Allan Gilliver
- Born: 18 June 1969 (age 57); Upper Agbrigg, Yorkshire, England
- Batting: Right-handed
- Bowling: Right-arm off break

Domestic team information
- Years: Team
- 1999–2001: Yorkshire Cricket Board

Career statistics
Competition	LA
Matches	4
Runs scored	98
Batting average	24.50
100s/50s	–/–
Top score	48
Balls bowled	–
Wickets	–
Bowling average	–
5 wickets in innings	–
10 wickets in match	–
Best bowling	–
Catches/stumpings	1/–
- Source: Cricinfo, 5 November 2010

Mark Allan Gilliver (born 18 June 1969) is a former English cricketer. Gilliver was a right-handed batsman who bowled right-arm off break. He was born in Upper Agbrigg, Yorkshire.

Gilliver represented the Yorkshire Cricket Board in List A cricket. His debut List A match came against Buckinghamshire in the 1999 NatWest Trophy. From 1999 to 2001, he represented the Board in 4 List A matches, the last of which came against the Northamptonshire Cricket Board in the 2001 Cheltenham & Gloucester Trophy. In his 4 List A matches, he scored 98 runs at a batting average of 24.50, with a high score of 48. In the field he took a single catch.
