= Glenn Gear =

Inuit Canadian multidisciplinary artist

Glenn Gear (born 1970) is a Canadian multidisciplinary artist and filmmaker, based in Montreal, Quebec, Canada. Gear's animations and installations have been showcased across Canada. He is the first Indigenous artist to be commissioned to create an outdoor installation piece for the Montreal Museum of Fine Arts.

== Biography ==
Glenn Gear is a queer "urban Inuk" artist with mixed Inuit and settler ancestry from Corner Brook.

Gear is an artist mentor for emerging Inuit youth filmmakers and was the 2020-2021 Artist-in-Residence for Inuit Futures in Arts Leadership: The Pilimmaksarniq/Pijariuqsarniq Project. He was also a visiting lecturer and artist-in-residence at Queen's University between November 2021 and September 2022. In 2022, Gear also had a residency at Eastern Edge Gallery in St-John's, NL, Canada. Gear has been a mentor and workshop facilitator in animation for 2SLGBTQQIA+ youth at the Toronto Queer Film Festival.

Gear studied Fine Arts in Photography at Memorial University and completed his Masters in Sculpture and Installations at Concordia University.

Gear's father is Inuk from Adlatok Bay, and his mother is a Newfoundlander of Irish and English ancestry from Wesleyville.

== Artistic career ==
Gear uses archival images in his installations. He also uses film, animation, digital and graphic art, painting, and drawing in his artwork. Gear is a cinematographer and photographer, and includes images of his own textile projects (beadwork and sealskin) in his exhibitions and films.

Through his artwork, Gear aims to change the narrative around the social view that indigenous peoples are frozen in time; instead, he shows how Inuit spirit and strength are intertwined and evolving alongside new technologies. He also showcases traditional Inuit art, such as tattoos, while raising awareness about animal cruelty and exploitation. This can be seen in his installation Ivaluk Ullugiallu-Sinew and Stars, which depicts caribou in Labrador; his installation at the Bonavista Biennale, which shows the over-exploitation of seals; and his Kimutsik Series, which highlights the qimmiijagtauniq (sled dog killings) events of the 1960s and 1970s. Gear's personal connection to nature, and the effects of climate change - while also inviting viewers to contemplate and reflect on one's connection to the land, its ecosystem, and a deep respect for all living beings - can also be seen in his artwork.

Gear has been shortlisted for the 2021 Sobey Art Awards and for the 2023 Kenojuak Ashevak Memorial Award.

== Main works ==
Gear's major works include:

- An animated short film: Kablunât: Legend of the Origin of the White People (2016), which has been screened across Canada.
- Kimutsik Series, which began in 2019 (including the video production: Kimutsiijut (dog team)) has been re-created in new versions to suit the location where it is shown. It has been viewed across Canada, including the Winnipeg Art Gallery and the Royal Bank Plaza Main Branch in Toronto.
- Ulitsuak|Marée montante|Rising Tide, projected on the exterior front of the Montreal Museum of Fine Arts Michal and Renata Hornstein Pavilion building, from October 1, 2024 until March 30, 2025, from nightfall until 11:00 pm, where Gear is the first Indigenous artist to be commissioned to create an outdoor installation piece for the Museum.

Gear's animations have been featured in documentaries such as Ever Deadly (2002) and The Fifth Region (2018), and have been shown at film festivals across Canada and around the world. Festivals such as the Skabmagovat - Indigenous People's Film Festival in Finland; the Māori Film Week in New Zealand; and the ImagineNATIVE Film +Media Arts Festival in Canada.

== Exhibitions ==
Solo exhibitions:

- Installation at the Banff Center of Arts and Creativity in 2016
- Gear revamped his video Rosewood Casket to be projected as the backdrop on Parliament Hill's main stage, during Canada Day Celebration in 2018.
- Installation at The Rooms called Ivaluk Ullugiallu-Sinew and Stars in 2023

Group exhibitions:

- Ommatik mural for June 21, 2018, National Indigenous Peoples Day, which was showcased under the Wellington bridge in Ottawa, Ontario, Canada between June 21, 2018, and October 2019. The mural was part of the exhibition nākatēyimisowin - Taking Care of Oneself spearheaded by Joi T. Arcand
- Iluani/Silami (it's full of stars) for Qaumajuq's inaugural exhibition INUA in Winnipeg, AB, Canada, in 2021
- J’entends ton chaud murmure à travers la brume froide / I hear your warm whisper through the cold mist. An installation that was created in collaboration with Christine Sioui Wawanoloath and Carla Hemlock, showcased in Drummondville from November 12 to December 18, 2022. Gear created a short animation video that was projected on the entrance wall.
- Three Way Mirror (2022-2023) exhibition at the grunt gallery in Vancouver, BC, Canada
- TakKik rising mural at Onsite Gallery in Toronto, ON, showcased in May 2024 as part of the Up Front: Inuit Public Art series
