= Paul Marks (cricketer) =

English cricketer (born 1967)

Personal information
- Full name: Paul Andrew Marks
- Born: 30 August 1967 (age 59); Southampton, Hampshire, England
- Height: 6 ft 2 in (1.88 m)
- Batting: Right-handed
- Bowling: Right-arm medium

Domestic team information
- Years: Team
- 2001: Hampshire Cricket Board

Career statistics
Competition	List A
Matches	2
Runs scored	22
Batting average	22.00
100s/50s	0/0
Top score	17*
Catches/stumpings	0/–
- Source: Cricinfo, 28 December 2009

Paul Andrew Marks (born 30 August 1967) is a former English cricketer. Marks was a right-handed batsman who bowled right-arm medium pace. He was born at Southampton in 1967.

Marks made his List-A debut for the Hampshire Cricket Board in the 1st Round of the 2001 Cheltenham and Gloucester Trophy against the Kent Cricket Board. Marks final List-A match came in 2nd Round of the 2002 Cheltenham and Gloucester Trophy, which was played in 2001 against Ireland.
