= Harshad Patel =

Kenyan cricketer (born 1964)

Personal information
- Full name: Harshad Vallabhbhai Patel
- Born: 29 January 1964 (age 62); Nairobi, Kenya
- Batting: Right-handed
- Bowling: Right-arm off break
- Relatives: Dipak Patel (cousin)

Domestic team information
- Years: Team
- 1985: Worcestershire
- 1988–1990: Staffordshire
- 1992–2012: Herefordshire

Career statistics
Competition	First-class	List A
Matches	1	13
Runs scored	39	259
Batting average	39.00	19.92
100s/50s	–/–	–/2
Top score	39	68
Catches/stumpings	–/–	4/–
- Source: Cricinfo, 22 September 2021

Harshad Vallabhbhai Patel (born 29 January 1964) is a Kenyan-born English former first-class cricketer.

A cousin of the New Zealand Test cricketer Dipak Patel, he was born in Nairobi in January 1964. After emigrating to England, Patel played first-class cricket for Worcestershire on a single occasion in 1985 against Cambridge University at Fenner's. Opening the batting alongside Lawrence Smith in Worcestershire's only innings, he was dismissed for 37 runs by Archie Cotterell. Patel did not feature for Worcestershire following this match. He joined Staffordshire in 1988, featuring for the county in minor counties cricket until 1990, and also made his debut in List A one-day cricket for the county against Glamorgan in the 1989 NatWest Trophy, scoring 63 runs in a losing cause against their first-class opponents.

After a two year break from county cricket, Patel joined Herefordshire in 1992, with the county having just been admitted to minor counties cricket to replace Durham who had been elevated to first-class status. Patel remained as a player with Herefordshire until 2012, making 103 appearances in the Minor Counties Championship and 38 appearances in the MCCA Knockout Trophy. In the Minor Counties Championship, he scored over 6,000 runs for Herefordshire, with eight centuries. He also made twelve List A appearances for Herefordshire when they were permitted to take part in the domestic one-day competition, scoring 196 runs with a highest score of 68. Harshad later coached Herefordshire and led them to victory in the 2016 MCC Knockout Trophy. His tenure as coach ended in 2017, with Patel considering himself to have been made a scapegoat by the Herefordshire committee for the lack of Herefordshire based players in the county eleven.
