= Durham Cricket Board =

The Durham Cricket Board is the governing body for all recreational cricket in the historic county of Durham.

From 1999 to 2003, the Board fielded a team in the English domestic one-day tournament, matches which had List-A status.
