= Cambridgeshire County Cricket Club =

Sports club

Team information
- Founded: 1891
- Home ground: The Avenue Sports Club Ground

History
- MCCC wins: 1
- MCCAT wins: 2
- FP Trophy wins: 0
- Official website: Cambridgeshire County Cricket Club

Cambridgeshire County Cricket Club is one of twenty minor county clubs within the domestic cricket structure of England and Wales. It represents the historic county of Cambridgeshire including the Isle of Ely.

The original Cambridgeshire club, established in 1844, is recognised as historically important from 1857 to 1863, and as first-class from 1864 to 1871. (Note: Any match listed in the ACS' Important Match Guide (1981) is historically important, and therefore of the highest standard, whether or not a scorecard might exist. The same applies to numerous matches discovered by researchers since 1981. For further information, see First-class cricket.)

The present club, founded in 1891, has always had minor status. It did play List A matches occasionally from 1964 until 2004, but it is not classified as a List A team per se. The club is based at The Avenue Sports Club Ground, March, though they have played a number of matches at Fenner's, Cambridge University's ground, and occasionally play games there still. In recent years, matches have also been held at Wisbech and Saffron Walden (in northwestern Essex).

== Honours ==
- Minor Counties Championship (1) – 1963; shared (0) –
- MCCA Knockout Trophy (2) – 1995, 2003

== Earliest cricket ==
Cricket must have reached Cambridgeshire in the 17th century. The earliest reference to the game being played there is at Cambridge University in 1710.

Outside the university, the earliest reference is a game in 1744 in the Isle of Ely, between the gentlemen of March and the gentlemen of Wisbeach, eleven of a side, for five pounds a man.

== Origin of club ==
Cambridge Town Club and Cambridgeshire were effectively the same team as the town club teams were representative of the county as a whole. The town club's earliest known match was against Cambridge University Cricket Club in 1819 and the county name was first used for the match against Surrey in 1857.

The town club was formed sometime before 1819 and eventually evolved into the original county club, which was formally established on 13 March 1844, playing under the name of "Cambridge Town and County Club". After 1847, the name reverted to Cambridge Town.

== Club history ==
The county club did not play matches outside East Anglia until 1857 when it played Surrey. It is classified as historically important from 1857 to 1863, and as first-class from 1864 to 1871. The club itself was dissolved in 1869 (according to James Lillywhite's Cricketers' Companion of that year) but two matches arranged in 1869 and 1871 involved playing members of the former club and the team in both these games was called Cambridgeshire by Wisden and other sources.

The club played 39 matches in all, winning thirteen, losing 21 and drawing five. The most successful season was 1864, when all three matches played were won. The regular home ground was Fenner's. Thomas Hayward made the most appearances, playing in 35 of the matches. He also made most runs, with 1,934 at 33.34, and scored two of the four centuries made for the county, both in 1861. He and Robert Carpenter put on 212 for the 3rd wicket against Surrey at The Oval in 1861, both scoring centuries. This was the highest partnership for the county. George Tarrant took the most wickets: 197 at 12.25, plus a further 22 wickets for which the runs conceded are not known. He had match figures of 15–56 against Kent at Chatham in 1862, including 8–16 in an innings. He also took 8–45 in an innings against Surrey at Fenner's the same year.

According to Simon Wilde, in the early 1860s Carpenter and Hayward were rated as two of the three finest batsmen in England along with Richard Daft. Daft himself ranked Carpenter and Hayward as being equal, but George Parr reckoned Carpenter to be the better. Wilde's own estimation was that Carpenter was the best batsman in England from 1860 to 1866.

The present club was founded on 6 June 1891.

Cambridgeshire first took part in the Minor Counties Championship in the competition's fourth season, 1898, and has competed every season since with the exception of 1902 and 1920. The club was revived in 1921 with HB Hart as Secretary and HC Tebbutt as captain, despite the club's financial situation being precarious. War veteran Tebbutt had debuted in 1901, but this was his final season. He later became notorious for murdering his partner and three children before killing himself.

It has won the Minor Counties Championship once, in 1963. As Eastern Division champions in both 1987 and 1988, Cambridgeshire became the first minor county to compete in four consecutive cup finals, albeit without success. Cambridgeshire have, however, won the MCCA Knockout Trophy twice since its inception, in 1995 and 2003. It also won the Eastern Division of the Minor Counties Championship again in 1994, 2011 and 2013, losing the subsequent finals.

Cambridgeshire County Cricket Club also played 28 List A matches between 1964 and 2004 (the great majority against first-class counties and occasionally on Test grounds) with 103 players making one or more appearances.

== Notable players ==
The following Cambridgeshire cricketers also made an impact on the first-class game:

- Gerry Alexander
- Mike Brearley
- Robert Carpenter
- Alfred Diver
- Thomas Hayward
- Tom Hayward
- Jack Hobbs
- Bill Hitch
- Terry Jenner
- Derick Parry
- George Tarrant
- Johnny Wardle

== Bibliography ==
- ACS (1981). A Guide to Important Cricket Matches Played in the British Isles 1709–1863. Nottingham: ACS. OCLC 85045528.
- ACS (1982). A Guide to First-class Cricket Matches Played in the British Isles. Nottingham: ACS. OCLC 10586869.
