= Nottinghamshire Cricket Board =

The Nottinghamshire Cricket Board is the governing body for all recreational cricket in the historic county of Nottinghamshire.

From 1999 to 2003 the board fielded a team in the English domestic one-day tournament, matches which had List-A status.

== Structure ==
The board is structured so there are a number of subcommittees, created to ensure input to the board chairman. These are the Finance, Policy, Development, Publicity, Advisory Services & Promotions, Senior Cricket, Junior, Youth and Coaching, Schools Cricket, Women & Girls Cricket and Cricket for the Disabled.
