= Warwickshire Cricket Board =

UK cricket board

The Warwickshire Cricket Board is the governing body for all recreational cricket in the historic county of Warwickshire.

From 1999 to 2003 the Board fielded a team in the English domestic one-day tournament, matches which had List-A status.
