= 2002 Cheltenham & Gloucester Trophy =

- Administrator: England and Wales Cricket Board
- Cricket format: Limited overs cricket (50 overs per innings)
- Tournament format: Knockout
- Champions: Yorkshire (3rd title)
- Participants: 60
- Matches: 59
- Most runs: 313 Ali Brown (Surrey)
- Most wickets: 11 Richard Cooper (Staffordshire)

The 2002 Cheltenham and Gloucester Trophy was an English limited overs county cricket tournament which was held between 29 August 2001 and 31 August 2002. It was the second Cheltenham & Gloucester Trophy, following its change of name from the NatWest Trophy. The tournament was won by Yorkshire who defeated Somerset by 6 wickets in the final at Lord's.

== Format ==
The 18 first-class counties, were joined by all twenty Minor Counties, plus Huntingdonshire. They were also joined by the cricket boards of Derbyshire, Durham, Essex, Gloucestershire, Hampshire, Kent, Lancashire, Leicestershire, Middlesex, Northamptonshire, Nottinghamshire, Somerset, Surrey, Sussex, Warwickshire, Worcestershire and Yorkshire. The national teams of Denmark, Ireland, the Netherlands and Scotland returned to the competition after being unable to take part in the previous competition due to international commitments in the 2001 ICC Trophy.

The tournament was a knockout with four rounds before the quarter-final and semi-final stages. The first and second rounds, which did not involve the first-class counties, were played at the end of the 2001 season to allow more room in the 2002 schedule. The winners of the semi-finals went on to the final at Lord's which was held on 31 August 2002.

=== First round ===
29 August 2001
(scorecard)

Bedfordshire; 367/3 (50 overs)	v	Derbyshire Cricket Board; 182 all out (36.3 overs)
David Clarke 176*; Carl Doar 1/44 (7 overs)		Jamie Benstead 65; Andrew Roberts 5/40 (8 overs)

Bedfordshire won by 185 runs
Lancot Park, Dunstable
Umpires: D. Blake & Charlie Puckett
Player of the match: David Clarke (Bedfordshire)

29 August 2001
(scorecard)

Buckinghamshire; 224/7 (50 overs)	v	Worcestershire Cricket Board; 185 all out (47 overs)
Paul Sawyer 43; Jonathan Wright 2/19 (10 overs)		David Manning 48; Jeremy Batty 3/51 (10 overs)

Buckinghamshire won by 39 runs
Dinton Cricket Club Ground, Dinton
Umpires: Alan Bundy & Tony Clarkson
Player of the match: Zaheer Sher (Buckinghamshire)

29 August 2001
(scorecard)

Lancashire Cricket Board; 128 all out (46.2 overs)	v	Cheshire; 131/2 (19.4 overs)
Roland Horridge 27*; Jason Whittaker 3/18 (8.2 overs)		Richard Hignett 54*; Stephen Dearden 1/24 (5 overs)

Cheshire won by 8 wickets
Boughton Hall Cricket Club Ground, Chester
Umpires: Kenneth Shenton & Tommy Wilson
Player of the match: Charles Lamb (Cheshire)

29 August 2001
(scorecard)

Warwickshire Cricket Board; 212/7 (50 overs)	v	Cumberland; 195 all out (48.4 overs)
Jim Troughton 115*; David Pennett 3/35 (10 overs)		Ashley Metcalfe 50; Jim Troughton 4/23 (5.4 overs)

Warwickshire Cricket Board won by 17 runs
St George's Road, Millom
Umpires: Charles McNamee & Colin Megennis
Player of the match: Jim Troughton (Warwickshire Cricket Board)

29 August 2001
(scorecard)

Essex Cricket Board; 237/9 (50 overs)	v	Sussex Cricket Board; 243/4 (44 overs)
Giles Ecclestone 66; Richard Halsall 4/34 (7 overs)		David Hussey 118*; Arif Saeed 2/33 (8 overs)

Sussex Cricket Board won by 6 wickets
County Ground, Chelmsford, Chelmsford
Umpires: David Burden & Sid Poole
Player of the match: David Hussey (Sussex Cricket Board)

29 August 2001
(scorecard)

Staffordshire; 268 all out (49.2 overs)	v	Hertfordshire; 107 all out (34.3 overs)
Paul Shaw 62; Ben Frazer 3/56 (10 overs)		Ben Frazer 24; Richard Cooper 5/42 (8.4 overs)

Staffordshire won by 161 runs
Digswell Park, Welwyn Garden City
Umpires: Bjarne Jensen & Ross Wood
Player of the match: David Follett (Staffordshire)

29 August 2001
(scorecard)

Huntingdonshire; 180/8 (50 overs)	v	Gloucestershire Cricket Board; 183/5 (42.1 overs)
Wayne Larkins 50 (82); James Rendell 3/36 (10 overs)		Neil Stovold 75 (62); Lee Peacock 2/31 (6 overs)

Gloucestershire Cricket Board won by 5 wickets
The Parks, Godmanchester
Umpires: Paul Joy & Cliff Pocock
Player of the match: Neil Stovold (Gloucestershire Cricket Board)

29 August 2001
(scorecard)

Northamptonshire Cricket Board; 212 all out (49 overs)	v	Leicestershire Cricket Board; 213/3 (33.3 overs)
Richard Falkner 37; Neil Pullen 3/25 (10 overs)		Neil Pullen 88; Mark Wolstenholme 1/19 (6 overs)

Leicestershire Cricket Board won by 7 wickets
Kirkby Road, Barwell
Umpires: Trevor Riley & John Wilkinson
Player of the match: Neil Pullen (Leicestershire Cricket Board)

29 August 2001
(scorecard)

Lincolnshire; 243/8 (50 overs)	v	Berkshire; 157 all out (41.5 overs)
Jonathan Trower 76; James Barrow 4/31 (10 overs)		Richard Davis 56; Robert Chapman 4/18 (8 overs)

Lincolnshire won by 86 runs
Lindum Sports Club Ground, Lincoln
Umpires: Robert Eagleton & John Tythcott
Player of the match: Mark Fell (Lincolnshire)

29 August 2001
(scorecard)

Scotland; 245/8 (50 overs)	v	Middlesex Cricket Board; 221 all out (50 overs)
Neil MacRae 83; Kirk Powell 3/49 (9 overs)		Stephen Price 85; Stuart Davidson 4/43 (10 overs)

Scotland won by 24 runs
John Walker's Ground, Southgate
Umpires: John Reed & Bob Sutton
Player of the match: Damien Wright (Scotland)

29 August 2001
(scorecard)

Norfolk; 245/3 (50 overs)	v	Netherlands; 245 all out (50 overs)
Carl Rogers 139*; Edgar Schiferli 2/38 (9 overs)		Hendrik-Jan Mol 56; Paul Bradshaw 4/30 (10 overs)

Norfolk won by losing fewer wickets
Manor Park, Horsford
Umpires: Peter Clubb & Martin White
Player of the match: Carl Rogers (Norfolk)

29 August 2001
(scorecard)

Nottinghamshire Cricket Board; 248/5 (50 overs)	v	Oxfordshire; 249/5 (47.3 overs)
Chris Tolley 78; Keith Arnold 2/46 (10 overs)		Craig Haupt 126*; Richard Hodgkinson 2/36 (8 overs)

Oxfordshire won by 5 wickets
Christ Church Ground, Oxford
Umpires: Wyn Morgan & David Tate
Player of the match: Craig Haupt (Oxfordshire)

29 August 2001
(scorecard)

Denmark; 112 all out (28.4 overs)	v	Suffolk; 114/3 (33.4 overs)
Aftab Ahmed 27; Ian Graham 4/17 (4 overs)		Dave Callaghan 49; Terry Crabb 2/19 (7 overs)

Suffolk won by 7 wickets
Old London Road, Copdock
Umpires: Keith Coburn & John Ilott
Player of the match: Dave Callaghan (Suffolk)

29 August 2001
(scorecard)

Ireland; 247 all out (50 overs)	v	Wiltshire; 162 all out (40.2 overs)
Dominick Joyce 67; Richard Bates 3/58 (10 overs)		Stephen Perrin 34; Paul Mooney 4/34 (7.2 overs)

Ireland won by 85 runs
Salisbury and South Wiltshire Sports Club, Salisbury
Umpires: Guy Randall-Johnson & Gordon Ripley
Player of the match: Peter Gillespie (Ireland)

=== Second round ===
13, 14 September 2001
(scorecard)

Buckinghamshire; 187 all out (47.3 overs)	v	Durham Cricket Board; 166 all out (46.1 overs)
Paul Atkins 50; Marcus North 4/26 (10 overs)		Gary Pratt 32; Zaheer Sher 3/23 (8.1 overs)

Buckinghamshire won by 21 runs
Wilton Park, Beaconsfield
Umpires: Michael Johnson & Ross Wood
Player of the match: Paul Atkins (Buckinghamshire)

- Match was scheduled for one day but extended to two.

13, 14 September 2001
(scorecard)

Warwickshire Cricket Board; 232 all out (49.1 overs)	v	Cambridgeshire; 157 all out (40 overs)
Ian Westwood 55; Ajaz Akhtar 4/29 (10 overs)		Robert Rollins 50; Bhavin Joshi 3/9 (2 overs)

Warwickshire Cricket Board won by 75 runs
The Avenue Sports Club Ground, March
Umpires: Trevor Henry & Cliff Pocock
Player of the match: Tom Mees (Warwickshire Cricket Board)

- Match was scheduled for one day but extended to two.

13, 14 September 2001
(scorecard)

Cornwall; 216/8 (45 overs)	v	Cheshire; 151 all out (43.3 overs)
Benjamin Price 74; Abey Kuruvilla 4/21 (9 overs)		Nathan Wood 50; James Hands 2/25 (9 overs)

Cornwall won by 65 runs
Booth Park, Toft
Umpires: Hugh Evans & Tommy Wilson
Player of the match: Steven Pope (Cornwall)

- Match was scheduled for one day but extended to two.

13 September 2001
(scorecard)

Bedfordshire; 266/8 (50 overs)	v	Devon; 268/7 (46.2 overs)
Neil Stanley 69; Neil Hancock 2/41 (8 overs)		Robert Dawson 88; Andrew Roberts 4/26 (10 overs)

Devon won by 3 wickets
The Maer Ground, Exmouth
Umpires: Alan Bundy & Guy Randall-Johnson
Player of the match: Robert Dawson (Devon)

13 September 2001
(scorecard)

Gloucestershire Cricket Board; 185/9 (50 overs)	v	Yorkshire Cricket Board; 186/6 (49.1 overs)
Christopher Budd 65; Stephen Foster 5/33 (10 overs)		Richard Wilkinson 36; Stuart Barnes 2/18 (10 overs)

Yorkshire Cricket Board won by 4 wickets
The Royal & Sun Alliance County Ground, Bristol
Umpires: Michael Moran & Wyn Morgan
Player of the match: Stephen Foster (Yorkshire Cricket Board)

13 September 2001
(scorecard)

Ireland; 241/7 (50 overs)	v	Hampshire Cricket Board; 209 all out (50 overs)
Andre Botha 75; David Greetham 2/52 (10 overs)		Richard Kenway 47; Andre Botha 3/30 (9 overs)

Ireland won by 32 runs
Rose Bowl, Southampton
Umpires: Steve Bishopp & Bob Sutton
Player of the match: Andre Botha (Ireland)

13, 14 September 2001
(scorecard)

Kent Cricket Board; 280/9 (50 overs)	v	Leicestershire Cricket Board; 91 all out (26.5 overs)
Matthew Banes 82; Neil Pullen 4/61 (10 overs)		Stephen Adshead 29; Ryan Minter 6/8 (7 overs)

Kent Cricket Board won by 189 runs
Leicester Road, Hinckley
Umpires: Trevor Riley & John Tythcott
Player of the match: Ryan Minter (Kent Cricket Board)

- Match was scheduled for one day but extended to two.

13, 14 September 2001
(scorecard)

Lincolnshire; 244/9 (50 overs)	v	Surrey Cricket Board; 150 all out (31 overs)
Oliver Burford 55; Andrew Hollingsworth 3/36 (10 overs)		Scott Newman 49; Shaun Trower 3/6 (5 overs)

Lincolnshire won by 94 runs
Abbey Lawn, Bourne
Umpires: Nigel Llong & Martin White
Player of the match: Oliver Burford (Lincolnshire)

- Match was scheduled for one day but extended to two.

13, 14 September 2001
(scorecard)

Norfolk; 173 all out (48.1 overs)	v	Somerset Cricket Board; 61/2 (22 overs)
Carl Amos 42; Matthew Bulbeck 5/18 (9.1 overs)		Kevin Sedgbeer 30*; Steve Goldsmith 1/17 (8 overs)

Norfolk won on faster scoring rate
Manor Park, Horsford
Umpires: Keith Coburn & John Ilott
Player of the match: Matthew Bulbeck (Somerset Cricket Board)

- Match was scheduled for one day but extended to two. When play was stopped Somerset Cricket Board needed to have scored 77 runs to win.

13, 14 September 2001
(scorecard)

Northumberland; 233/9 (50 overs)	v	Staffordshire; 234/3 (45.1 overs)
John Graham 55; Richard Cooper 3/46 (10 overs)		Ottis Gibson 102*; Graeme Angus 2/25 (10 overs)

Staffordshire won by 7 wickets
Osborne Avenue, Jesmond
Umpires: Charles McNamee & John Thallon
Player of the match: Graeme Archer (Staffordshire)

- Match was scheduled for one day but extended to two.

13, 14 September 2001
(scorecard)

Shropshire; 200/8 (50 overs)	v	Oxfordshire; 192/9 (50 overs)
Dominic Williamson 49; Benjamin Thompson 2/36 (7 overs)		Benjamin Thompson 42; Gavin Byram 3/33 (8 overs)

Shropshire won by 8 runs
Shrewsbury Road, Shifnal
Umpires: Bill Smith & David Tate
Player of the match: Adam Byram (Oxfordshire)

- Match was scheduled for one day but extended to two.

13, 14 September 2001
(scorecard)

Suffolk; 254/7 (50 overs)	v	Herefordshire; 151 all out (41.4 overs)
Christopher Warn 52* (40); Nicholas Davies 2/30 (10 overs)		Christopher Boroughs 59* (111); Dave Callaghan 3/28 (10 overs)

Suffolk won by 103 runs
Victory Ground, Bury St Edmunds
Umpires: David Burden & Paul Joy
Player of the match: Christopher Warn (Suffolk)

- Match was scheduled for one day but extended to two.

13 September 2001
(scorecard)

Wales Minor Counties; 238 all out (50 overs)	v	Sussex Cricket Board; 235 all out (49.3 overs)
Phil Simmons 51; John Morgan 4/55 (10 overs)		George Campbell 57; David Towse 3/24 (10 overs)

Wales Minor Counties won by 3 runs
Horntye Park, Hastings
Umpires: Charlie Puckett & John Reed
Player of the match: Phil Simmons (Wales Minor Counties)

13, 14 September 2001
(scorecard)

Dorset; 101 all out (43 overs)	v	Scotland; 103/0 (15.5 overs)
Chris Park 35; Stuart Davidson 3/15 (7 overs)		Damien Wright 53*

Scotland won by 10 wickets
Boghall Cricket Club Ground, Linlithgow
Umpires: Colin Megennis & Ken Shuttleworth
Player of the match: Damien Wright (Scotland)

- Match was scheduled for one day but extended to two.

=== Third round ===
24 May 2002
(scorecard)

Middlesex; 291/5 (50 overs)	v	Essex; 295/5 (48.1 overs)
Sven Koenig 116 (115); Ronnie Irani 2/47 (10 overs)		Nasser Hussain 96 (99); Simon Cook 2/48 (10 overs)

Essex won by 5 wickets
County Ground, Chelmsford
Umpires: Mark Benson & Peter Willey
Player of the match: Ronnie Irani (Essex)

24 May 2002
(scorecard)

Derbyshire; 167 all out (46.2 overs)	v	Lancashire; 169/0 (28.1 overs)
Dominic Hewson 63 (101); Peter Martin 2/21 (9 overs)		Glen Chapple 81* (69)

Lancashire won by 10 wickets
Old Trafford, Manchester
Umpires: Jeff Evans & Neil Mallender
Player of the match: Mark Chilton (Lancashire)

29 May 2002
(scorecard)

Sussex; 268/6 (50 overs)	v	Buckinghamshire; 143/7 (50 overs)
Tim Ambrose 95 (139); Zaheer Sher 3/56 (9 overs)		Zaheer Sher 55* (105); Billy Taylor 2/23 (9 overs)

Sussex won by 125 runs
Wilton Park, Beaconsfield
Umpires: Vanburn Holder & Barrie Leadbeater
Player of the match: Tim Ambrose (Sussex)

29 May 2002
(scorecard)

Ireland; 164/10 (50 overs)	v	Nottinghamshire; 165/2 (37.2 overs)
Kyle McCallan 30 (90); Derek Heasley 1/20 (4 overs)		Usman Afzaal 64* (77); Usman Afzaal 3/8 (4 overs)

Nottinghamshire won by 8 wickets
Wilton Park, Beaconsfield
Umpires: Vanburn Holder & Barrie Leadbeater
Player of the match: Tim Ambrose (Sussex)

29, 30 May 2002
(scorecard)

Worcestershire; 125/7 (30 overs)	v	Cornwall; 76 all out (29.2 overs)
David Leatherdale 40 (44); Charlie Shreck 5/19 (6 overs)		Gavin Edwards 27 (30); Kabir Ali 4/2 (4.2 overs)

Worcestershire won by 49 runs
Boscawen Park, Truro
Umpires: Trevor Jesty & Roy Palmer
Player of the match: Charlie Shreck (Cornwall)

- Match was scheduled for one day but extended to two. Match was reduced to 30 overs per side.

29 May 2002
(scorecard)

Yorkshire; 259/5 (50 overs)	v	Devon; 116 all out (39.4 overs)
Craig White 87 (73); Neil Hancock 2/44 (10 overs)		Robert Dawson 31 (56); Richard Dawson 4/34 (8.4 overs)

Yorkshire won by 143 runs
The Maer Ground, Exmouth
Umpires: Kevin Lyons & John Steele
Player of the match: Craig White (Yorkshire)

29, 30 May 2002
(scorecard)

Kent Cricket Board; 145 all out (47.5 overs)	v	Hampshire; 150/2 (26.3 overs)
Hugo Loudon 38 (64); Chris Tremlett 3/20 (9.5 overs)		Derek Kenway 76 (65); Darren Scott 1/40 (5.3 overs)

Hampshire won by 8 wickets
Cheriton Road Sports Ground, Folkestone
Umpires: Neil Bainton & John Holder
Player of the match: Derek Kenway (Hampshire)

- Match was scheduled for one day but extended to two.

29 May 2002
(scorecard)

Lincolnshire; 154 all out (46.5 overs)	v	Glamorgan; 157/4 (37.4 overs)
Simon Webb 55 (104); Andrew Davies 5/19 (9 overs)		Steve James 47 (70); Simon Oakes 2/37 (10 overs)

Glamorgan won by 6 wickets
London Road, Sleaford
Umpires: Ken Palmer & Ken Shuttleworth
Player of the match: Simon Webb (Lincolnshire)

29 May 2002
(scorecard)

Kent; 341/6 (50 overs)	v	Norfolk; 150/8 (50 overs)
Rob Key 77 (116); Paul Taylor 2/59 (10 overs)		Carl Amos 39 (79); Amjad Khan 4/22 (6 overs)

Kent won by 191 runs
Manor Park, Horsford
Umpires: Paul Adams & George Sharp
Player of the match: Matthew Fleming (Kent)

29, 30 2002
(scorecard)

Shropshire; 98 all out (30.2 overs)	v	Gloucestershire; 99/3 (27.2 overs)
Marcus Marvell 26 (39); Mark Hardinges 4/19 (7 overs)		Kim Barnett 54* (96); Dominic Williamson 1/18 (5 overs)

Gloucestershire won by 7 wickets (D/L method)
London Road, Shrewsbury
Umpires: Graham Burgess & David Constant
Player of the match: Mark Hardinges (Gloucestershire)

- Match was scheduled for one day but extended to two. Match was reduced to 32 overs per side, Gloucestershire target was 97 runs.

29 May 2002
(scorecard)

Warwickshire; 192 all out (50 overs)	v	Staffordshire; 142 all out (45.4 overs)
Nick Knight 54 (103); Richard Cooper 3/39 (10 overs)		Graeme Archer 34 (62); Alan Richardson 5/35 (10 overs)

Warwickshire won by 50 runs
Lichfield Road, Stone
Umpires: Keith Coburn & Ian Gould
Player of the match: Shaun Pollock (Warwickshire)

29 May 2002
(scorecard)

Suffolk; 128/9 (50 overs)	v	Northamptonshire; 132/9 (39.3 overs)
Philip Caley 35 (82); Darren Cousins 2/12 (8 overs)		Mal Loye 34 (45); Andrew Hall 4/33 (10 overs)

Northamptonshire won by 1 wicket
Victory Ground, Bury St Edmunds
Umpires: Pasty Harris & Jeremy Lloyds
Player of the match: Kevin Shaw (Suffolk)

29, 30 May 2002
(scorecard)

Durham; 301/5 (50 overs)	v	Wales Minor Counties; 65/2 (25 overs)
Michael Gough 132 (140); Jamie Sylvester 2/44 (8 overs)		Phil Simmons 32* (57); Neil Killeen 1/12 (4 overs)

Durham won by 49 runs (D/L method)
Sophia Gardens, Cardiff
Umpires: Mervyn Kitchen & Alan Whitehead
Player of the match: Michael Gough (Durham)

- Match was scheduled for one day but extended to two. When play was halted Wales Minor Counties needed to have scored 115 runs to win.

29 May 2002
(scorecard)

Leicestershire; 208/7 (50 overs)	v	Warwickshire Cricket Board; 182/8 (50 overs)
Vince Wells 49* (55); Naheem Sajjad 3/21 (10 overs)		Huw Jones 72 (99); Devon Malcolm 3/24 (10 overs)

Leicestershire won by 26 runs
Bulls Head Ground, Coventry
Umpires: Peter Hartley & Trevor Jesty
Player of the match: Huw Jone (Warwickshire Cricket Board)

29 May 2002
(scorecard)

Somerset; 255/9 (50 overs)	v	Yorkshire Cricket Board; 168/8 (50 overs)
Peter Bowler 104 (142); Rich Pyrah 5/50 (9 overs)		Neil Gill 37 (26); Keith Dutch 3/26 (10 overs)

Somerset won by 87 runs
North Marine Road, Scarborough
Umpires: Nigel Cowley & Richard Kettleborough
Player of the match: Rich Pyrah (Yorkshire Cricket Board)

29, 30 May 2002
(scorecard)

Surrey; 246/2 (50 overs)	v	Scotland; 63/4 (24.1 overs)
Mark Ramprakash 101* (134); Kevin Thomson 1/41 (10 overs)		Greig Williamson 22 (62); Ed Giddins 2/9 (7 overs)

Surrey won by 55 runs (D/L method)
The Grange, Edinburgh
Umpires: Tony Clarkson & Michael Dixon
Player of the match: Mark Ramprakash (Surrey)

- Match was scheduled for one day but extended to two. When play was halted Scotland needed to have scored 119 runs to win.

=== Fourth round ===
19 June 2002
(scorecard)

Lancashire; 166 all out (46.5 overs)	v	Essex; 167/1 (28.3 overs)
Andrew Flintoff 45 (63); Ashley Cowan 4/27 (10 overs)		Nasser Hussain 83* (96); Chris Schofield 1/32 (5 overs)

Essex won by 9 wickets
County Ground, Chelmsford
Umpires: Graham Burgess & Alan Whitehead
Player of the match: Nasser Hussain (Essex)

19 June 2002
(scorecard)

Durham; 179 all out (47.3 overs)	v	Gloucestershire; 180/2 (26 overs)
Marc Symington 34 (68); Mark Alleyne 4/27 (7 overs)		Craig Spearman 104* (77); Danny Law 1/14 (4 overs)

Gloucestershire won by 8 wickets
The Royal & Sun Alliance County Ground, Bristol
Umpires: Nigel Llong & David Shepherd
Player of the match: Craig Spearman (Gloucestershire)

19 June 2002
(scorecard)

Kent; 328/9 (50 overs)	v	Warwickshire; 200 all out (37.1 overs)
James Hockley 121 (107); Mike Powell 5/40 (7 overs)		Ian Bell 50 (60); Andrew Symonds 3/21 (4 overs)

Kent won by 128 runs
St Lawrence Ground, Canterbury
Umpires: Barry Dudleston & Jeff Evans
Player of the match: James Hockley (Kent)

19 June 2002
(scorecard)

Leicestershire; 233 all out (49.1 overs)	v	Sussex; 234/4 (47.3 overs)
Trevor Ward 112 (134); Billy Taylor 4/37 (9 overs)		Richard Montgomerie 126 (140); Grant Flower 2/33 (10 overs)

Sussex won by 6 wickets
Grace Road, Leicester
Umpires: Tony Clarkson & Jeremy Lloyds
Player of the match: Richard Montgomerie (Sussex)

19 June 2002
(scorecard)

Yorkshire; 303/3 (50 overs)	v	Northamptonshire; 254 all out (48.2 overs)
Matthew Wood 91 (99); Darren Cousins 1/52 (10 overs)		Jeffrey Cook 70 (59); Chris Silverwood 2/35 (10 overs)

Yorkshire won by 49 runs
County Ground, Northampton
Umpires: Nigel Cowley & Ken Palmer
Player of the match: Chris Silverwood (Yorkshire)

19 June 2002
(scorecard)

Nottinghamshire; 262/5 (50 overs)	v	Worcestershire; 265/2 (44 overs)
Jason Gallian 69 (79); David Leatherdale 2/35 (8 overs)		Graeme Hick 117* (104); Nicky Boje 1/48 (9 overs)

Worcestershire won by 8 wickets
Trent Bridge, Nottingham
Umpires: Pasty Harris & Neil Mallender
Player of the match: Vikram Solanki (Worcestershire)

19 June 2002
(scorecard)

Hampshire; 262/5 (50 overs)	v	Somerset; 265/4 (45.1 overs)
John Crawley 113* (135); Richard Johnson 2/42 (10 overs)		Marcus Trescothick 133* (115); Dimitri Mascarenhas 1/48 (8 overs)

Somerset won by 6 wickets
County Ground, Taunton
Umpires: Trevor Jesty & Allan Jones
Player of the match: Marcus Trescothick (Somerset)

19 June 2002
(scorecard)

Surrey; 438/5 (50 overs)	v	Glamorgan; 429 all out (49.5 overs)
Ali Brown 268 (160); Darren Thomas 3/108 (9 overs)		Robert Croft 119 (69); Adam Hollioake 5/77 (8.5 overs)

Surrey won by 9 runs
The Oval, London
Umpires: Ian Gould & Peter Willey
Player of the match: Ali Brown (Surrey)

=== Quarter-finals ===
16 July 2002
(scorecard)

Essex; 283/9 (50 overs)	v	Yorkshire; 283/5 (50 overs)
Andy Flower 75 (82); Darren Lehmann 2/28 (6 overs)		Anthony McGrath 72* (70); Graham Napier 2/47 (7 overs)

Yorkshire won by losing fewer wickets
County Ground, Chelmsford
Umpires: Allan Jones & Roy Palmer
Player of the match: Anthony McGrath (Yorkshire)

16 July 2002
(scorecard)

Gloucestershire; 232/8 (50 overs)	v	Kent; 238/5 (44.2 overs)
Kim Barnett 108 (136); Martin Saggers 3/41 (9 overs)		Matthew Fleming 53 (42); Mark Alleyne 2/46 (10 overs)

Kent won by 5 wickets
St Lawrence Ground, Canterbury
Umpires: David Constant & Vanburn Holder
Player of the match: Kim Barnett (Gloucestershire)

17 July 2002
(scorecard)

Worcestershire; 271 all out (49 overs)	v	Somerset; 273/6 (47.3 overs)
Ben Smith 85 (104); Steffan Jones 3/47 (8 overs)		Keith Parsons 121 (100); Matt Mason 2/58 (8.3 overs)

Somerset won by 6 wickets
County Ground, Taunton
Umpires: Jeff Evans & Ian Gould
Player of the match: Keith Parsons (Somerset)

17 July 2002
(scorecard)

Surrey; 337/3 (50 overs)	v	Sussex; 323/8 (50 overs)
Adam Hollioake 117* (59); Robin Martin-Jenkins 2/65 (10 overs)		Murray Goodwin 110* (86); Adam Hollioake 2/50 (7 overs)

Surrey won by 14 runs
County Ground, Hove
Umpires: Barrie Leadbeater & John Steele
Player of the match: Adam Hollioake (Surrey)

=== Semi-finals ===
31 July, 1, 2, 3 August 2002
(scorecard)

Surrey; 173/8 (48 overs)	v	Yorkshire; 167/0 (24.1 overs)
Mark Ramprakash 63 (114); Craig White 4/35 (10 overs)		Craig White 100* (78)

Yorkshire won by 10 wickets
Headingley, Leeds
Umpires: Barry Dudleston & John Holder
Player of the match: Craig White (Yorkshire)

- Match was scheduled for one day but extended to four. Surrey innings was reduced to 48 overs. Yorkshire target was 167 runs in 42 overs.

1 August 2002
(scorecard)

Somerset; 344/5 (50 overs)	v	Kent; 339 all out (49.1 overs)
Ian Blackwell 86 (53); James Golding 1/38 (7 overs)		Matthew Fleming 63 (48); Keith Parsons 4/55 (8 overs)

Somerset won by 5 runs
County Ground, Taunton
Umpires: Barrie Leadbeater & Alan Whitehead
Player of the match: Ian Blackwell (Somerset)

=== Final ===
31 August 2002
(scorecard)

Somerset; 256/8 (50 overs)	v	Yorkshire; 260/4 (48 overs)
Peter Bowler 67 (89); Matthew Hoggard 5/65 (10 overs)		Matthew Elliott 128* (125); Richard Johnson 3/51 (10 overs)

Yorkshire won by 6 wickets
Lord's, London
Umpires: John Holder & George Sharp
Player of the match: Matthew Elliott (Yorkshire)
