= Zaheer Sher =

English cricketer (born 1975)

Personal information
- Full name: Zaheer Abbas Sher
- Born: 13 January 1975 (age 51); Slough, Berkshire
- Batting: Right-handed
- Bowling: Right-arm medium

Domestic team information
- Years: Team
- 1992–1999: Bedfordshire
- 1996: Minor Counties
- 2001–2013: Buckinghamshire

Career statistics
Competition	List A
Matches	14
Runs scored	253
Batting average	42.16
100s/50s	0/1
Top score	55*
Balls bowled	618
Wickets	21
Bowling average	28.47
5 wickets in innings	0
10 wickets in match	0
Best bowling	3/20
Catches/stumpings	2/–
- Source: Cricinfo, 9 May 2011

Zaheer Abbas Sher (born 13 January 1975) is an English cricketer. Sher is a right-handed batsman who bowls right-arm medium pace. He was born in Slough, Berkshire. His nickname is Bobby.

Sher made his debut for Bedfordshire in the 1999 Minor Counties Championship against Staffordshire. Sher played Minor counties cricket for Bedfordshire from 1992 to 1999, which included 31 Minor Counties Championship matches and 13 MCCA Knockout Trophy matches. It was while playing for Bedfordshire that Sher made his debut in List A cricket for a combined Minor Counties cricket team against Derbyshire in the 1996 Benson & Hedges Cup. His debut in that format for Bedfordshire came against Glamorgan in the 1998 NatWest Trophy. He played 4 further List A matches for Buckinghamshire.

Sher later joined Buckinghamshire in 2001, making his debut for the county against Suffolk in the Minor Counties Championship. Sher continues to play Minor counties cricket for Buckinghamshire to this day. He played List A cricket at a time when Buckinghamshire were permitted to take part in one-day cricket with the first-class counties. His debut in for Buckinghamshire in that format came against the Worcestershire Cricket Board in the 1st round of the 2002 Cheltenham & Gloucester Trophy which was held in 2001. He played 7 further List A matches for the county, the last coming against Lancashire in the 2005 Cheltenham & Gloucester Trophy. It was for Buckinghamshire that he played the most List A matches for, and enjoyed the most success. With the bat he scored 165 runs at a batting average of 41.25, with a single half century high score of 55* which came against Sussex in the 3rd round of the 2002 Cheltenham & Gloucester Trophy. An all-rounder, with the ball he took 13 wickets for the county, at a bowling average of 26.76, with best figures of 26.76.

Overall, he played 14 List A matches. In these he scored 253 runs at an average of 42.16, with a high score of 55*. With the ball he took 21 wickets at an average of 28.47, with best figures of 3/20. He has previously played Second XI cricket for the Gloucestershire Second XI and the Worcestershire Second XI.
