= Marcus Marvell =

English cricketer (born 1970)

Personal information
- Full name: Marcus James Marvell
- Born: 18 November 1970 (age 55); Shrewsbury, Shropshire, England
- Batting: Right-handed
- Bowling: Slow left-arm orthodox

Domestic team information
- Years: Team
- 2004: Suffolk
- 1996: Minor Counties
- 1994–2003: Shropshire

Career statistics
Competition	List A
Matches	5
Runs scored	71
Batting average	17.75
100s/50s	–/–
Top score	26
Balls bowled	66
Wickets	2
Bowling average	29.50
5 wickets in innings	–
10 wickets in match	–
Best bowling	1/21
Catches/stumpings	–/–
- Source: Cricinfo, 2 July 2011

Marcus James Marvell (born 18 November 1970) is a former English cricketer. Marvell was a right-handed batsman who bowled slow left-arm orthodox. He was born in Shrewsbury, Shropshire and educated at Ellesmere College and Newcastle University.

Marvell made his debut for Shropshire in the 1994 Minor Counties Championship against Herefordshire but sprung to prominence with a hat-trick against Wales in the same season. Marvell played Minor counties cricket for Shropshire from 1994 to 2003, which included 32 Minor Counties Championship appearances and 17 MCCA Knockout Trophy appearances with a top score of 141 not out against Oxfordshire in 2001 and best bowling figures of 6–15 against Berkshire in 1995. While playing for Shropshire, he made his List A debut for the Minor Counties cricket team against Leicestershire in the 1996 Benson & Hedges Cup. He played a further match in that competition against Durham and was a part of the side that defeated the touring West Indies team at Reading Cricket Club on 13 July 1995. Success at this level earned him trials with Middlesex where he impressed against Sussex 2nd XI at Southgate Cricket Club on 26–28 June 1995 scoring an unbeaten century in the first innings and taking 5–34 in the second. His displays for Middlesex led to further trials for Derbyshire and Gloucestershire, but to no full-time contract. His first List A match for Shropshire came in 2002 Cheltenham & Gloucester Trophy against Gloucestershire. He made 2 further limited-overs appearances for the county, against Buckinghamshire in the second round of the 2003 Cheltenham & Gloucester Trophy, which was played in 2002, and Northumberland in the 1st round of the 2004 Cheltenham & Gloucester Trophy, which was played in 2003. In his career total of five List A matches, he scored 71 runs at an average of 17.25, with a high score of 26. With the ball, he took 2 wickets at a bowling average of 29.50, with best figures of 1/21. While playing for Shropshire he played at club level for Wroxeter and Walsall. Marvell spent a season as the overseas professional for CBCOB Cricket Club in Pretoria, South Africa and in 1999 represented Rostrevor OC Cricket Club in Adelaide, South Australia.

In 2004, Marvell joined Suffolk, making two Minor Counties Championship appearances and 3 MCCA Knockout Trophy appearances. He retired from Minor Counties cricket at the end of that season. Marvell also had the distinction of captaining Shropshire at rugby between 2000 and 2001.
