= Kenway =

Kenway may refer to:

== Persons ==
- Derek Kenway (born 1978), English cricketer
- Nan Kenway, Australian-British entertainer
- Richard Kenway (born 1975), English cricketer

== Fictional characters ==
- Haytham Kenway, from the 2012 video game Assassin's Creed III
- Connor Kenway, from the 2012 video game Assassin's Creed III
- Edward Kenway, from the 2013 video game Assassin's Creed IV: Black Flag

== Other ==
- 17046 Kenway, a main-belt asteroid, discovered 1999
