= Dominic Williamson =

English cricketer (born 1975)

Personal information
- Full name: Dominic Williamson
- Born: 15 November 1975 (age 50); Durham, County Durham, England
- Batting: Right-handed
- Bowling: Right-arm medium

Domestic team information
- Years: Team
- 2001–2002: Shropshire
- 1996–2000: Leicestershire (squad no. 23)

Career statistics
Competition	First-class	List A
Matches	9	68
Runs scored	273	497
Batting average	30.33	13.80
100s/50s	–/–	–/–
Top score	47	49
Balls bowled	989	2,246
Wickets	14	80
Bowling average	37.78	21.46
5 wickets in innings	–	2
10 wickets in match	–	–
Best bowling	3/19	5/32
Catches/stumpings	5/–	17/–
- Source: Cricinfo, 3 August 2011

Dominic Williamson (born 15 November 1975) is an English cricketer. Williamson is a right-handed batsman who bowls right-arm medium pace. He was born in Durham, County Durham.

Williamson made his first-class debut for Leicestershire against the touring Indians in 1996. He played infrequently in first-class cricket for Leicestershire, making 8 further first-class appearances, the last of which came against Hampshire in the 2000 County Championship. In his 9 first-class matches, he scored 273 runs at an average of 30.33, with a high score of 47. With the ball, he took 14 wickets at an average of 37.78, with best figures of 3/19.

It was though in List A cricket that Williamson was the prove to be more useful, making his debut for the county against Derbyshire in the 1996 Benson & Hedges Cup. He made 65 further List A appearances for Leicestershire, the last of which came against Yorkshire in the 1996 Norwich Union National League. In his 66 List A matches for the county, he scored 446 runs at an average of 13.11, with a high score of 39. With the ball, he took 79 wickets at an average of 21.29, with a best figures of 5/32. These figures, one of two five wicket hauls he took for Leicestershire, came against Sussex in the 1997 AXA Life League. In terms of wickets taken, the 1998 season was his most successful, with Williamson taking 33 wickets at an average of 18.84, with best figures of 5/37. Despite his success in the limited-overs format, Williamson left Leicestershire at the end of the 2000 season.

In 2001 he joined Shropshire, making his debut for the county against the Worcestershire Cricket Board in the 2001 MCCA Knockout Trophy. He played Minor counties cricket for Shropshire in 2001 and 2002, making 6 Minor Counties Championship appearances and 4 MCCA Knockout Trophy appearances. He made 2 List A appearances while playing for Shropshire. The first of these came against Oxfordshire in the 2nd round of the 2002 Cheltenham & Gloucester Trophy, which was played in August 2001. In this match, he made his highest List A score of 49, before being dismissed by Luke List. With the ball, he bowled 4 wicket-less overs for the cost of 17 runs. The second of these came in the 3rd round of the same competition against Gloucestershire, which was played in May 2002. In this match, he scored 2 runs before being dismissed by Mike Smith, while with the ball he took the wicket of Mark Hardinges for the cost of 18 runs from 5 overs, with Gloucestershire winning by 7 wickets.
