= Christopher Budd =

Christopher Budd may refer to:

- Christopher Budd (mathematician) (born 1960), British mathematician
- Christopher Budd (cricketer) (born 1978), former English cricketer
- Christopher Budd (bishop) (1937–2023), British Roman Catholic prelate
