= Darren Scott =

Darren Scott may refer to:

- Darren Scott (cricketer) (born 1972), English cricketer
- Darren Scott (Family Affairs), fictional character in the former British soap opera Family Affairs
- Darren Scott, known as DRS, part of the Scottish rapper and songwriter duo SHY & DRS
