= Kevin Shaw (disambiguation) =

Kevin Shaw (born 1971) is an English cricketer.

Kevin Shaw may also refer to:

- Kevin Shaw (athlete) in Tiberias Marathon
- Kevin Shaw (colorist), co-founder of Colorist Society International
