= Terry Crabb =

Danish cricketer (born 1976)

Personal information
- Full name: Terry Colin Crabb
- Born: 23 July 1976 (age 50); Auckland, New Zealand
- Batting: Left-handed
- Bowling: Left-arm medium

Domestic team information
- Years: Team
- 1997/98–2001/02: Auckland
- 2001: Denmark

Career statistics
Competition	First-class	List A
Matches	2	4
Runs scored	49	9
Batting average	16.33	3.00
100s/50s	0/0	0/0
Top score	24	9
Balls bowled	–	108
Wickets	–	4
Bowling average	–	27.00
5 wickets in innings	–	0
10 wickets in match	–	0
Best bowling	–	2/19
Catches/stumpings	4/–	2/–
- Source: Cricinfo, 15 January 2011

Terry Colin Crabb (born 23 July 1976) is a New Zealand former cricketer. Crabb was a left-handed batsman who bowled left-arm medium pace. He was born in Auckland.

Crabb made his first-class debut for Auckland in the 1997/98 season against Canterbury. It was during that season that he played his second and final first-class match against Northern Districts. In those two first-class matches, he scored 49 runs at a batting average of 16.33, with a high score of 24. Later, during the 2000/01 Shell Cup he made his List A debut for Auckland against Northern Districts. Following the end of the New Zealand cricket season, Crabb played as Denmark's overseas player in the 2002 Cheltenham & Gloucester Trophy in English domestic cricket, playing a single match against Suffolk, in a match which was played in 2001. The following New Zealand cricket season, he played his final two List A matches against Wellington and Otago. Crabb played a total of 4 List A matches, during which he scored 9 runs at an average of 3.00, with a high score of 9. While with the ball he took 4 wickets at a bowling average of 27.00, with best figures of 2/19.
