= Oliver Burford =

English cricketer

Personal information
- Full name: Oliver Edward Burford
- Born: 23 July 1980 (age 46); Lincoln, Lincolnshire, England
- Batting: Right-handed
- Role: Wicket-keeper

Domestic team information
- Years: Team
- 1999–present: Lincolnshire

Career statistics
Competition	List A
Matches	8
Runs scored	123
Batting average	20.50
100s/50s	–/1
Top score	55
Balls bowled	–
Wickets	–
Bowling average	–
5 wickets in innings	–
10 wickets in match	–
Best bowling	–
Catches/stumpings	5/1
- Source: Cricinfo, 23 June 2011

Oliver Edward Burford (born 23 July 1980) is an English cricketer. Burfield is a right-handed batsman who fields as a wicket-keeper. He was born in Lincoln, Lincolnshire.

Burford made his debut for Lincolnshire in the 1999 Minor Counties Championship against Cambridgeshire. Burford has played Minor counties cricket for Lincolnshire from 1999 to present, which included 65 Minor Counties Championship matches and 39 MCCA Knockout Trophy matches. He made his List A debut against Suffolk in the 2001 Cheltenham & Gloucester Trophy. He played 7 further List A matches for Lincolnshire, the last coming against Glamorgan in the 2004 Cheltenham & Gloucester Trophy. In his 8 matches, he scored 123 runs at an average of 20.50. He scored a half century against the Surrey Cricket Board in the 2002 Cheltenham & Gloucester Trophy. Behind the stumps, Burford took 5 catches and made a single stumping.

He has previously played Second XI cricket for the Nottinghamshire and Gloucestershire Second XI's.
