= Bjarne Jensen =

Bjarne Jensen may refer to:

- Bjarne Jensen (curler) (born 1956), Danish wheelchair curler
- Bjarne Jensen (footballer) (born 1959), retired Danish footballer
- Bjarne Jensen (umpire) (born 1958), Danish cricket umpire

== See also ==
- Bjarne Henning-Jensen (1908–1995), Danish film director and screenwriter
