= Simon Oakes =

Simon Oakes may refer to:

- Simon Oakes (executive), CEO and president of Hammer Films
- Simon Oakes (cricketer) (born 1974), English cricketer
