= Paul Atkins =

Paul Atkins may refer to:

- Paul Atkins (cinematographer), American cinematographer
- Paul Atkins (rugby league) (born 1982), former New Zealand rugby league player
- Paul S. Atkins, chair of the U.S. Securities and Exchange Commission
- Paul Atkins (cricketer) (born 1966), English cricketer
- Paul Atkins (Australian footballer) (1968–2026), Australian rules footballer
