= Huw Jones =

Huw Jones may refer to:

- Huw Jones (bishop) (1934–2016), Welsh Anglican bishop
- Huw Jones (cricketer) (born 1980), English cricketer
- Huw Jones (rugby union) (born 1993), Scottish rugby union player
- Huw Robert Jones (1894–1930), Welsh nationalist activist
- Huw Ceredig Jones (1942–2011), Welsh actor
- Simon Huw Jones (born 1960), British musician
- Huw Jones (field hockey) (born 1980), Welsh field hockey player
- Huw Jones, singer-songwriter and broadcaster, co-founder in 1969 of the Welsh record label Sain
