= Graeme Archer =

Graeme Archer may refer to:

- Graeme Archer (cricketer) (born 1970), English cricketer
- Graeme Archer (bowls) (born 1967), Scottish lawn bowler
