= Booth Park =

Cricket ground in England

Booths Park
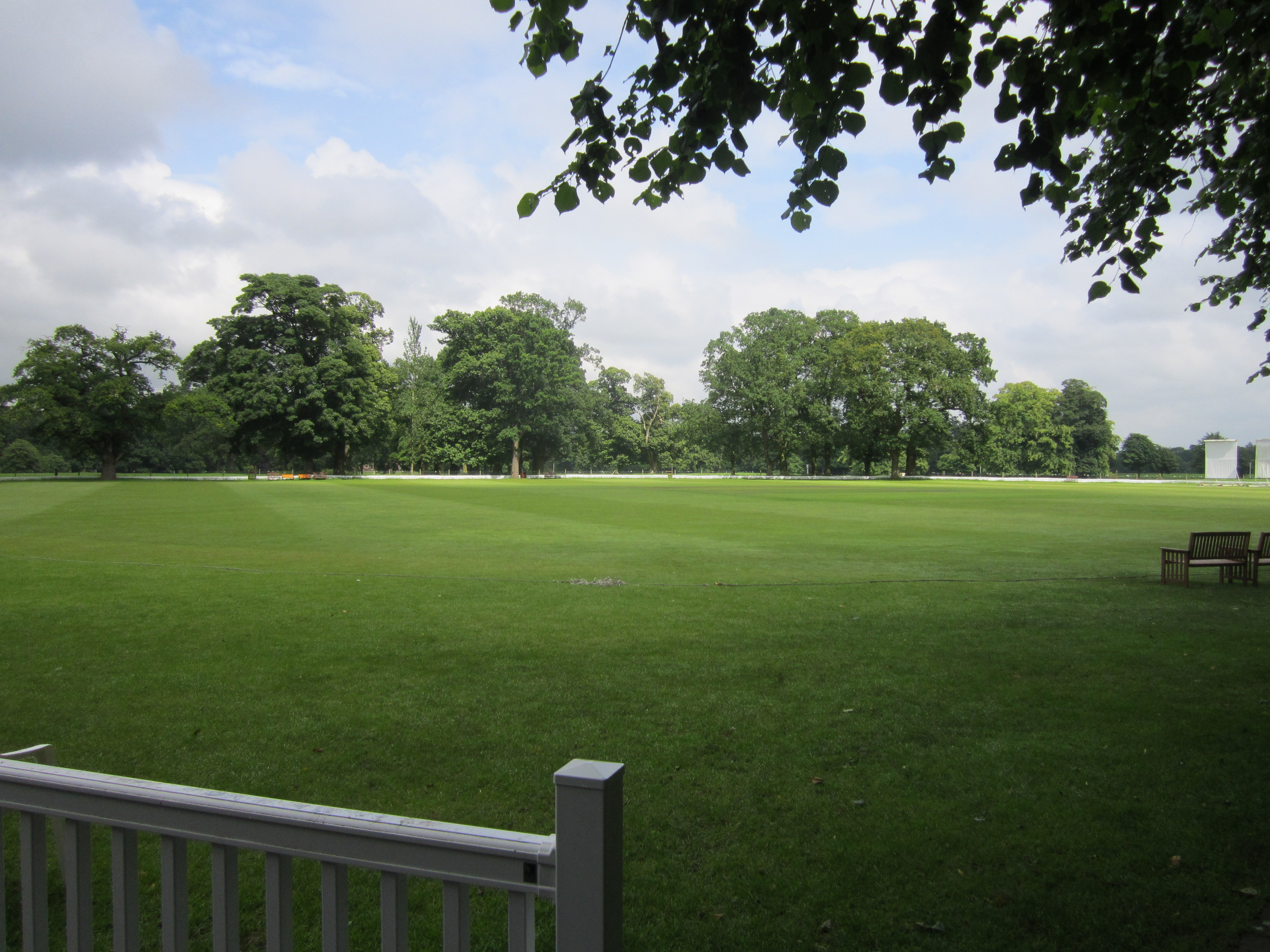
- Interactive map of Booths Park

Ground information
- Location: Toft, Cheshire
- Country: England
- Coordinates: 53.2965°N 2.3560°W
- Establishment: 1928

Team information
Cheshire	(1982–2012)
- As of 10 July 2012; Source: Ground profile

Booth Park is a cricket ground in Chelford Road, Toft, Cheshire. The ground lies within the grounds of Booths Park, which surrounds the east and south of the ground, while the western side is bordered by residential housing. The ground is used by Toft Cricket Club.

== History ==
The ground was established in 1928. Cheshire first used the ground in the 1982 Minor Counties Championship against Northumberland. The ground hosted a single Minor Counties Championship annually until 1998, with fourteen matches being played there, the last of which saw Oxfordshire at the visitors. The ground held its first List A match when Cheshire played Cornwall in the second round of the 2002 Cheltenham & Gloucester Trophy, which was held in 2001 to avoid fixture congestion. A second List A match was held there in 2002, when Cheshire played Huntingdonshire in the first round of the 2003 Cheltenham & Gloucester Trophy, with its early round matches once again played in the season before to avoid fixture congestion in 2003. Cheshire lost to Cornwall, but defeated Huntingdonshire. Cheshire returned to the ground in 2012, playing a MCCA Knockout Trophy match against Dorset.

== Records ==
=== List A ===
- Highest team total: 230/5 (50 overs) by Cheshire v Huntingdonshire, 2001
- Lowest team total: 151 all out (43.3 overs) by Cheshire v Cornwall, 2002
- Highest individual innings: 74 by Benjamin Price for Cornwall v Cheshire, as above
- Best bowling in an innings: 4/21 by Abey Kuruvilla for Cheshire v Cornwall, as above

== Gallery ==
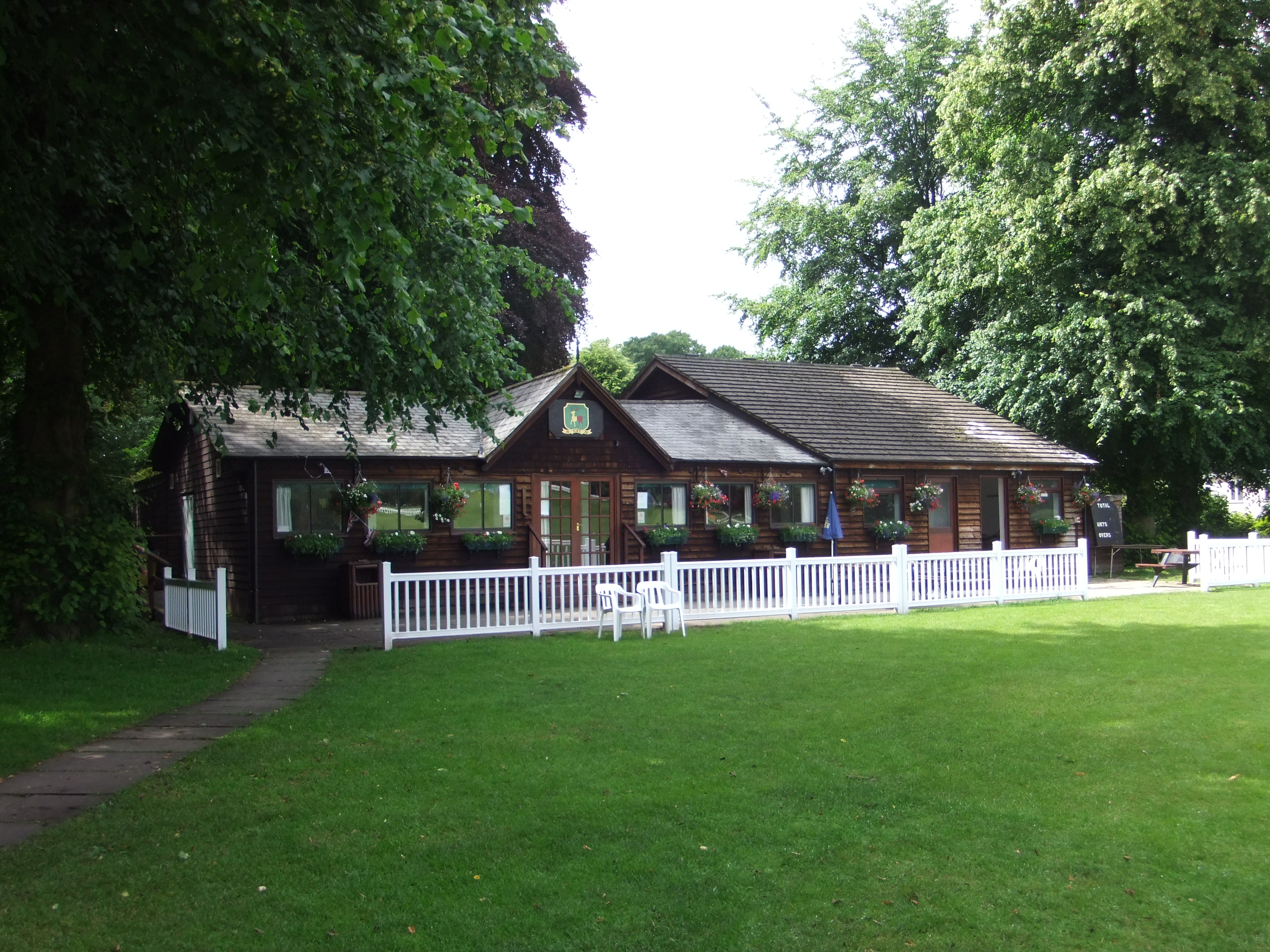
View of the pavilion.

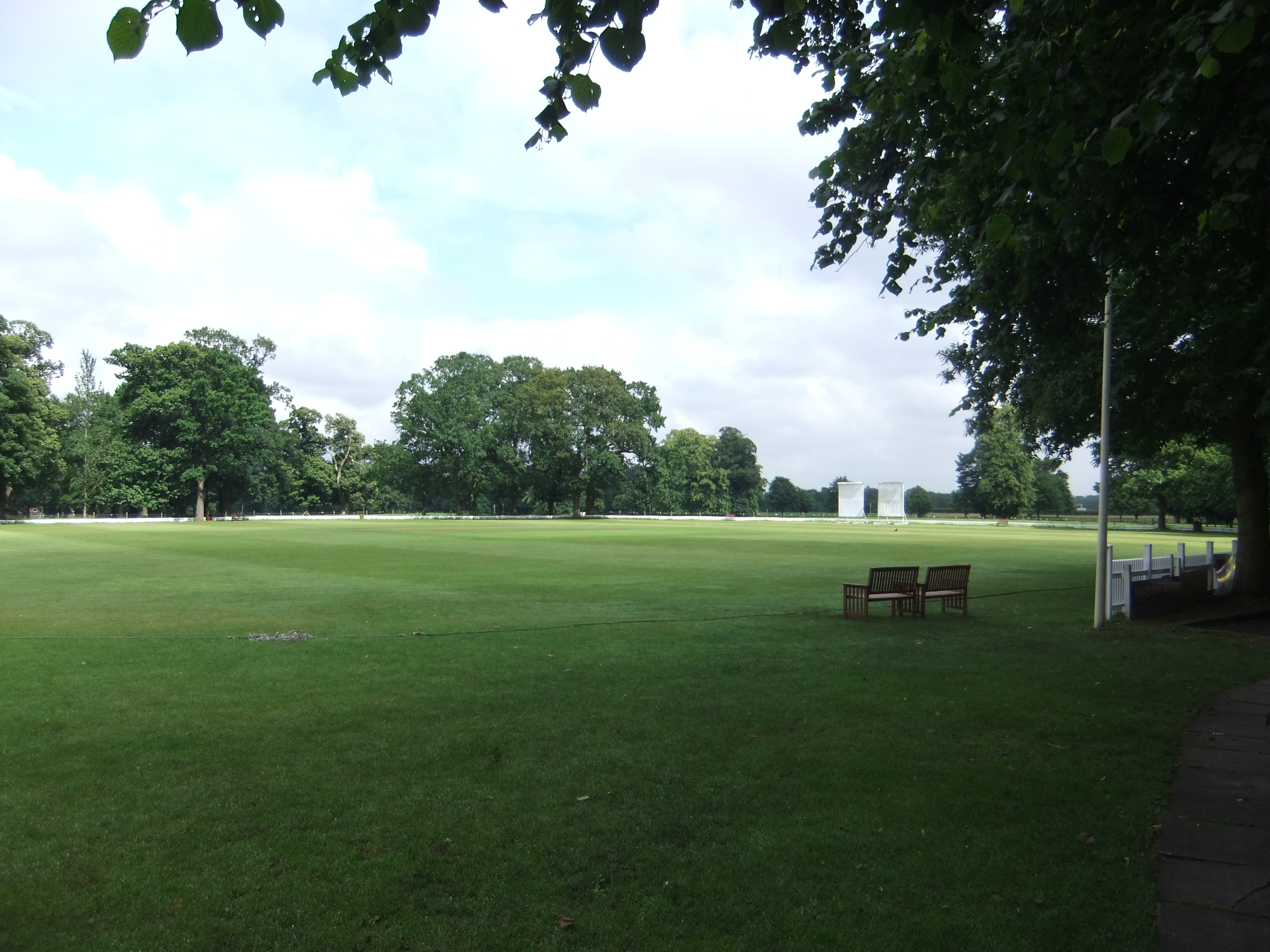
View of the ground looking south.

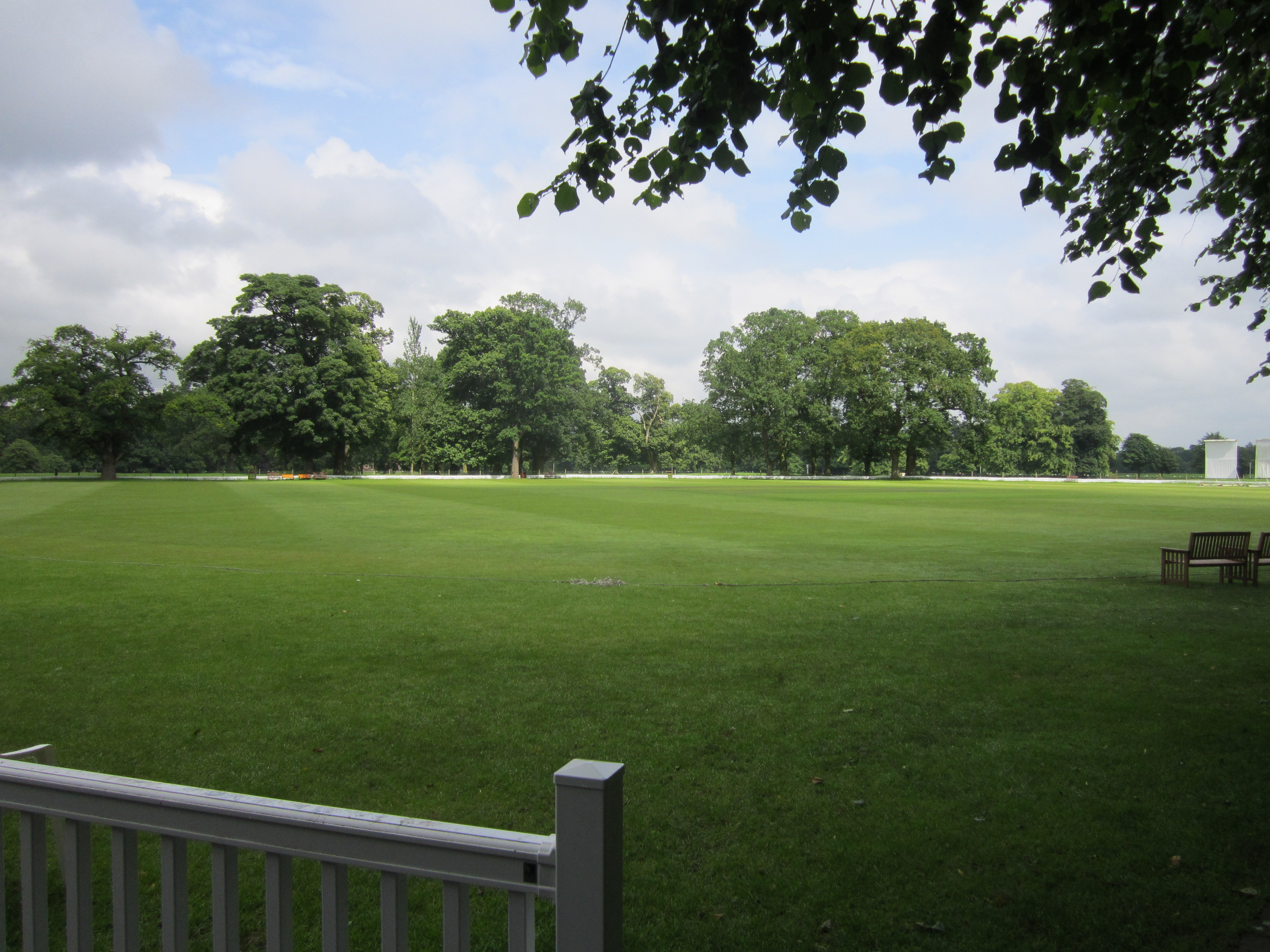
View of the ground looking east.

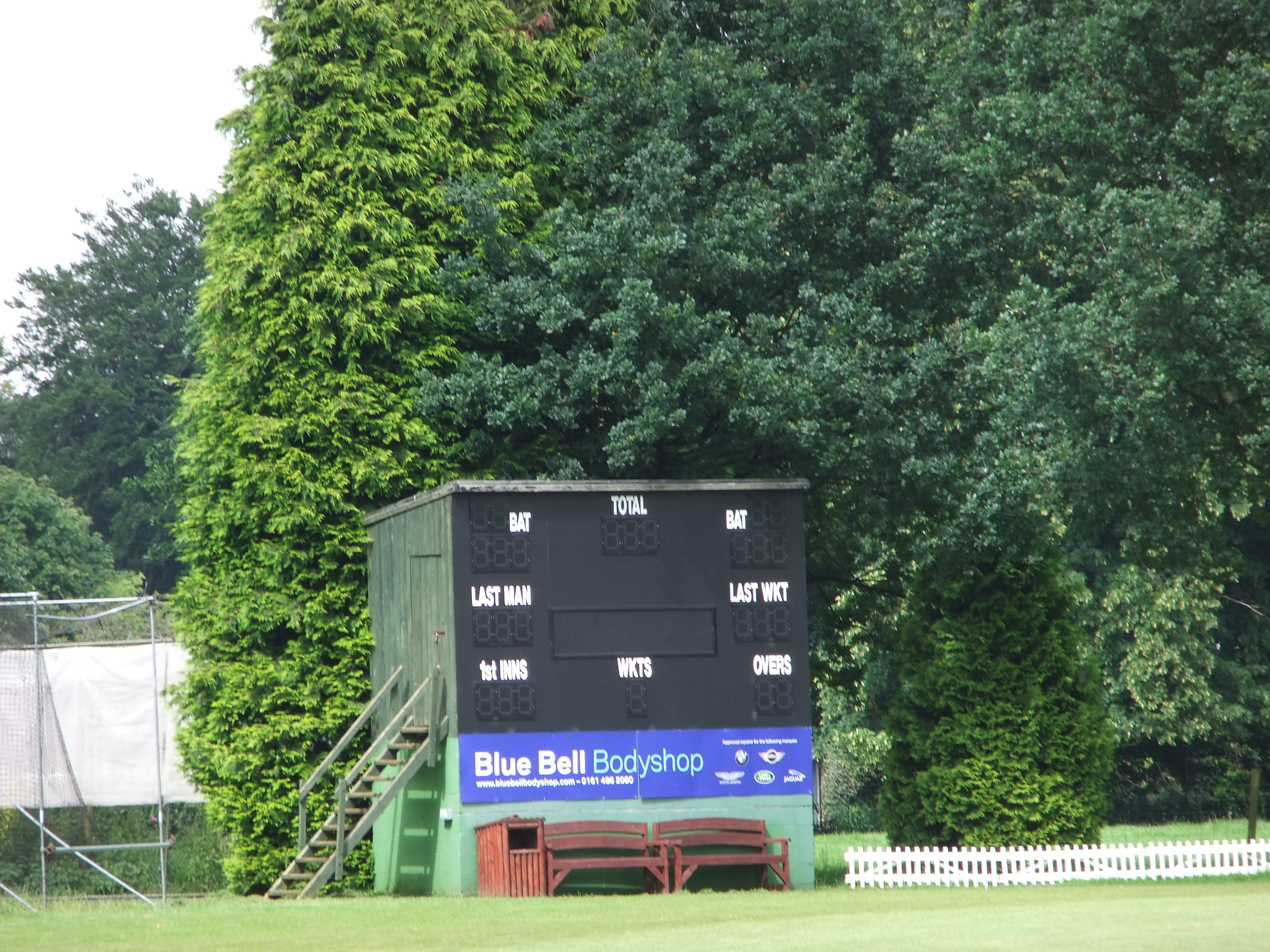
View of the scorers hut.

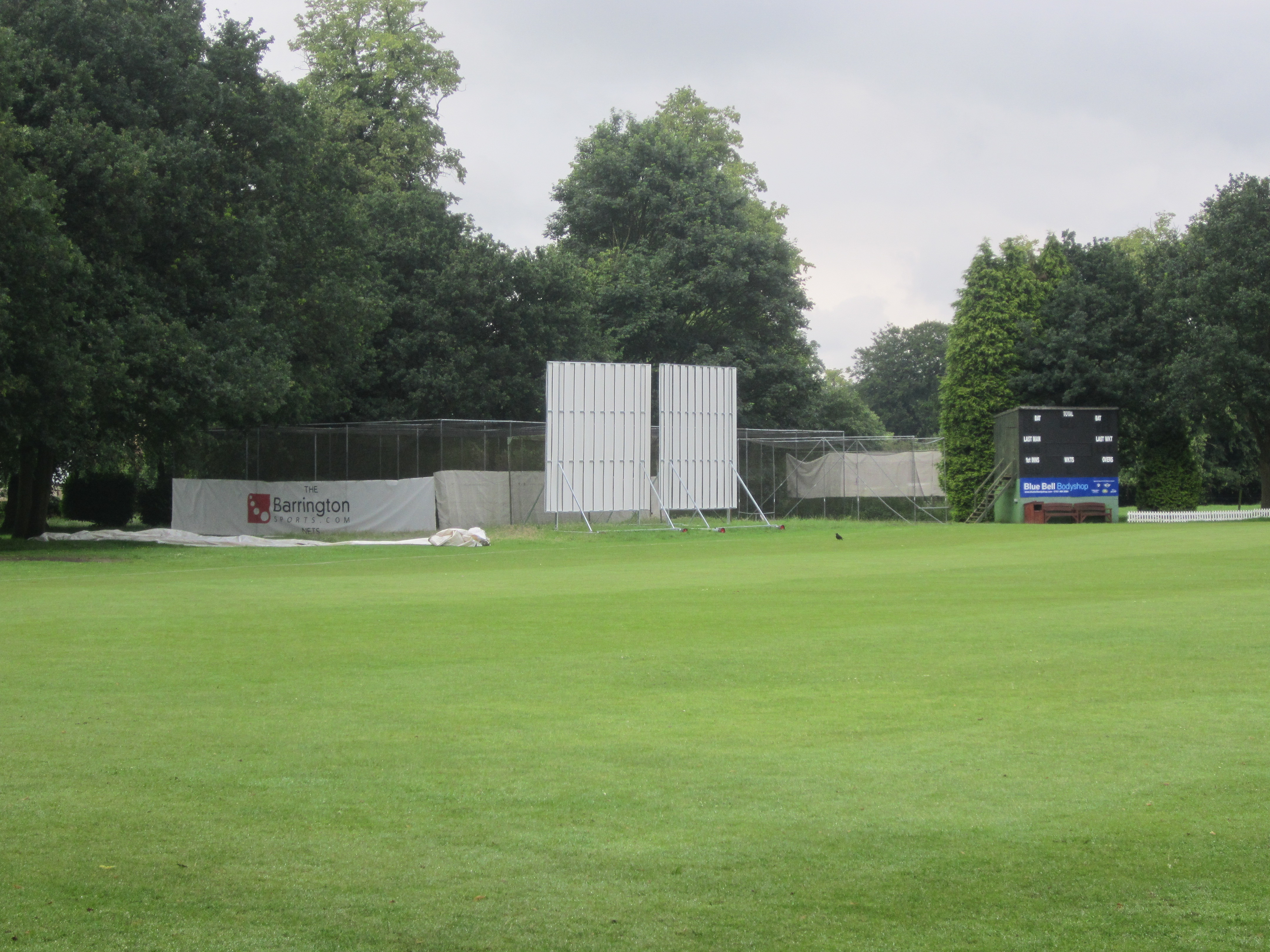
View toward the practice nets.

== See also ==
- List of cricket grounds in England and Wales
