= Adam Byram =

English cricketer (born 1971)

Personal information
- Full name: Adam Bramley Byram
- Born: 17 March 1971 (age 55); Wellington, Shropshire, England
- Batting: Left-handed
- Bowling: Slow left-arm orthodox
- Relatives: Gavin Byram (brother)

Domestic team information
- Years: Team
- 2003: Staffordshire
- 1989–2002: Shropshire

Career statistics
Competition	List A
Matches	13
Runs scored	127
Batting average	14.11
100s/50s	–/–
Top score	32*
Balls bowled	726
Wickets	14
Bowling average	33.21
5 wickets in innings	–
10 wickets in match	–
Best bowling	4/24
Catches/stumpings	5/–
- Source: Cricinfo, 3 July 2011

Adam Bramley Byram (born 17 March 1971) is a former English cricketer. Byram was a left-handed batsman who bowled slow left-arm orthodox. He was born in Wellington, Shropshire and educated at Shrewsbury College.

Byram made his debut for Shropshire in the 1989 Minor Counties Championship against Oxfordshire. Byram played Minor counties cricket for Shropshire from 1989 to 2002, which included 96 Minor Counties Championship appearances and 33 MCCA Knockout Trophy appearances. He made his List A debut against Derbyshire in the 1990 NatWest Trophy. He made 12 further List A appearances, the last of which came against Gloucestershire in 2002 Cheltenham & Gloucester Trophy. In his 13 List A matches, he scored 127 runs at an average of 14.11, with a high score of 32 not out. With the ball, he took 14 wickets at a bowling average of 33.21, with best figures of 4/24.

In 2003, he played Minor counties cricket for Staffordshire, making a couple of appearances each in the Minor Counties Championship and MCCA Knockout Trophy.

Byram also played for Second XI teams of Warwickshire, Lancashire, Worcestershire and Glamorgan. At club level he played in Shropshire for Wellington.

His brother, Gavin, also played Minor counties and List A cricket for Shropshire.
