= Gavin Byram =

English cricketer (born 1974)

Personal information
- Full name: Gavin James Byram
- Born: 15 February 1974 (age 52); Shrewsbury, Shropshire, England
- Batting: Right-handed
- Bowling: Right-arm fast-medium
- Relatives: Adam Byram (brother) Isabella Byram (daughter)

Domestic team information
- Years: Team
- 1992–2002: Shropshire

Career statistics
Competition	List A
Matches	8
Runs scored	77
Batting average	12.83
100s/50s	–/1
Top score	56
Balls bowled	357
Wickets	10
Bowling average	25.40
5 wickets in innings	–
10 wickets in match	–
Best bowling	3/33
Catches/stumpings	–/–
- Source: Cricinfo, 2 July 2011

Gavin James Byram (born 15 February 1974) is a former English cricketer. Byram was a right-handed batsman who bowled right-arm fast-medium. He was born in Shrewsbury, Shropshire and educated at Shrewsbury College.

Byram made his debut for Shropshire in the 1992 Minor Counties Championship against Herefordshire. Byram played Minor counties cricket for Shropshire from 1992 to 2002, which included 50 Minor Counties Championship appearances and 26 MCCA Knockout Trophy appearances. He made his List A debut against Sussex in the 1997 NatWest Trophy. He made 7 further List A appearances, the last of which came against Oxfordshire in the 2nd round of the 2002 Cheltenham & Gloucester Trophy, which was played in 2001. In his 8 List A matches, he scored 77 runs at an average of 12.83, with a high score of 56. This score came against Devon in the 2001 Cheltenham & Gloucester Trophy. With the ball, he took 10 wickets at a bowling average of 25.40, with best figures of 3/33. Below List A, he also played for Worcestershire's Second XI team and at club level for Wellington in Shropshire.

His brother, Adam, also played Minor counties and List A cricket for Shropshire.
