= Trevor Henry (umpire) =

Irish cricket umpire

- Born: 14 April 1954
- Died: 6 February 2006 (aged 51)
- Occupation: Cricket umpire

Trevor Henry (14 April 1954 – 6 February 2006) was an Irish cricket umpire. Henry first officiated a match of note in 1999 when Ireland played the South Africa Academy cricket team in a first-class fixture. Henry later stood in four first-class fixtures spread over the 2004 and 2005 Intercontinental Cup's, officiating in his final first-class fixture when Canada played the Cayman Islands. In the 2005 ICC Trophy, Henry stood in 15 matches during the tournament. He officiated in his first List A match, which was between Cambridgeshire and the Warwickshire Cricket Board in the 2nd round of the 2002 Cheltenham & Gloucester Trophy which was played in 2001. He later stood in 8 further List A matches between 2002 and 2005. Henry's final List A match officiating as an on-field umpire came in the 2005 ICC Trophy when he stood in a match between Oman and the United States.

By 2006, Henry was appointed to the ICC Associates and Affiliates Umpire Panel and in February of that year he was due to officiate at the 2006 Under-19 Cricket World Cup in Sri Lanka. Henry died of cancer on 6 February, leaving behind his wife Roberta and four children. The Trevor Henry Fund scholarship was later set up in his honour, and provides funding and development support for umpires across Europe.
