= Richard Cooper (cricketer, born 1972) =

English cricketer

Personal information
- Full name: Richard Andrew Cooper
- Born: 7 August 1972 (age 54); Stoke-on-Trent, Staffordshire, England
- Batting: Right-handed
- Bowling: Right-arm fast-medium

Domestic team information
- Years: Team
- 2001–2006: Staffordshire

Career statistics
Competition	List A
Matches	6
Runs scored	1
Batting average	0.33
100s/50s	–/–
Top score	1
Balls bowled	265
Wickets	14
Bowling average	16.42
5 wickets in innings	1
10 wickets in match	–
Best bowling	5/42
Catches/stumpings	–/–
- Source: Cricinfo, 13 June 2011

Richard Andrew Cooper (born 7 August 1972) is a current English cricketer and an over 50's England International. Cooper is a right-handed batsman who bowls right-arm fast-medium. He was born at Stoke-on-Trent, Staffordshire.

Cooper made his debut for Staffordshire in the 2001 MCCA Knockout Trophy against the Derbyshire Cricket Board. Cooper played Minor counties cricket for Staffordshire from 2001 to 2006, which included 25 Minor Counties Championship matches and fourteen MCCA Knockout Trophy matches. In 2001, he made his List A debut against the Worcestershire Cricket Board in the Cheltenham & Gloucester Trophy. It was however in the 2002 Cheltenham & Gloucester Trophy that Cooper was to stand out with the ball, taking 11 wickets to emerge as the tournaments leading wicket-taker, despite playing just three matches. It was in the 1st round match against Hertfordshire that Cooper took his only five wicket haul in List A cricket, taking figures of 5/42. He played two further List A matches for Staffordshire, against the Hampshire Cricket Board in the 2nd round of the 2003 Cheltenham & Gloucester Trophy which was played in 2002, and Surrey in the following round. In his six List A matches, he took 14 wickets at an average of 16.42.

On 15 November 2022 Richard Cooper was included in the England Over 50's team to tour South Africa in 2023. Cooper picked up three wickets to help England to win the Over-50s World Cup beating hosts South Africa in the final.
