= Paul Atkins (cricketer) =

English cricketer

Paul David Atkins
Personal information
- Full name: Paul David Atkins
- Born: 11 June 1966 (age 60); Aylesbury, Buckinghamshire, England
- Batting: Right-handed
- Bowling: Right-arm off break

Domestic team information
- Years: Team
- 1986–2010: Buckinghamshire
- 1988–1993: Surrey
- 2006/07: KwaZulu-Natal Inland

Career statistics
Competition	First-class	List A
Matches	25	17
Runs scored	1,103	430
Batting average	25.65	30.71
100s/50s	1/4	1/3
Top score	114*	110
Catches/stumpings	10/–	10/–
- Source: Cricinfo, 14 July 2025

Paul David Atkins (born 11 June 1966) is an English former first-class cricketer. Atkins was a right-handed batsman who bowled right-arm off break. He was born in Aylesbury, Buckinghamshire.

== Early career and Surrey ==
Atkins made his debut in county cricket for Buckinghamshire in the 1985 Minor Counties Championship against Cheshire. Atkins played Minor counties cricket for a few years, before making his debut for Surrey in a first-class match against Cambridge University. Atkins played 23 further first-class matches for Surrey, the last coming against Derbyshire in the 1993 County Championship. In his 24 first-class matches for Surrey, he scored 1,081 runs at a batting average of 26.36, with 4 half centuries and a single century high score of 114*. His highest score came against Cambridge University on debut.

It was for Surrey that he made his debut in List A cricket against Glamorgan in the 1988 NatWest Trophy. He played 6 further List A matches for Surrey, the last coming against Somerset in the 1993 AXA Equity and Law League. For Surrey, he scored 154 runs in this format at an average of 25.66, with 2 half centuries and a high score of 82.

== Return to Buckinghamshire ==
Atkins' time with Surrey came to an end at the end of the 1993 season. It wasn't until 1998 that he began representing Buckinghamshire in Minor counties cricket again. It was the season following his return to the county that he first appeared for Buckinghamshire in List A cricket, against the Yorkshire Cricket Board in the 1999 NatWest Trophy.

He played nine further List A matches for the county in the period when they were permitted to take part in English domestic List A cricket, with his final appearance coming against Dorset in the 1st round of the 2004 Cheltenham & Gloucester Trophy, which was played in 2003. In his 10 matches for the county, he scored 276 runs at an average of 34.50, with century high score of 110. This high score came against Suffolk in the 2003 Cheltenham & Gloucester Trophy, with Atkins' innings being ended on 110 by Kevin Shaw.

Atkins continued to play Minor counties cricket for Buckinghamshire through to 2010. He appeared in total in 90 Minor Counties games and 47 MCCA Knockout Trophy matches. He also captained Buckinghamshire.

Outside of playing, Atkins coaches for KwaZulu-Natal in South Africa. It was some 14 years after playing first-class cricket that he turned out for KwaZulu-Natal Inland against South Western Districts in 2007. In this match he scored 4 runs in their first-innings before being dismissed by Nathan Murray, and in their second-innings he scored 18 runs before being dismissed by Rudy Hillermann. He is also a head coach for the Andrew Flintoff Cricket Academy.
