= Joseph Smith (cricketer) =

Jamaican-born English cricketer

Personal information
- Full name: Joseph Abraham Smith
- Born: 23 March 1946 (age 80); Kingston, Surrey County, Jamaica
- Batting: Left-handed
- Bowling: Left-arm fast-medium

Domestic team information
- Years: Team
- 1982: Minor Counties
- 1968–1988: Shropshire

Career statistics
Competition	List A
Matches	5
Runs scored	37
Batting average	9.25
100s/50s	–/–
Top score	17
Balls bowled	320
Wickets	9
Bowling average	18.00
5 wickets in innings	–
10 wickets in match	–
Best bowling	4/8
Catches/stumpings	–/–
- Source: Cricinfo, 4 July 2011

Joseph Abraham Smith (born 23 March 1946) is a Jamaican-born former English cricketer. Smith was a left-handed batsman who bowled left-arm fast-medium. He was born in Kingston, Jamaica.

Smith made his debut for Shropshire in the 1968 Minor Counties Championship against Cambridgeshire. Smith played Minor counties cricket for Shropshire from 1968 to 1988, which included 113 Minor Counties Championship appearances and eight MCCA Knockout Trophy appearances, while playing at club level for Wellington in Shropshire and Crewe in Cheshire. He made his List A debut against Yorkshire in the 1976 Gillette Cup. In 1977 he served as Shropshire's captain. He made two further List A appearances for Shropshire, against Surrey in the 1978 Gillette Cup and Northamptonshire in the 1985 NatWest Trophy. In his three List A matches for the county, he took 5 wickets at an average of 22.60, with best figures of 3/40.

Playing for Shropshire allowed him to play for the Minor Counties cricket team, with Smith making two appearances for that team in the 1982 Benson & Hedges Cup against Worcestershire and Leicestershire. In these two matches, he took four wickets at an average of 12.25. All 4 of his wickets came against Leicestershire, with Smith taking figures 4/8.
