= James Barrow =

English cricketer (born 1964)

Personal information
- Full name: James Keith Barrow
- Born: 16 December 1964 (age 61); Haslemere, Surrey, England
- Batting: Right-handed
- Bowling: Right-arm fast-medium

Domestic team information
- Years: Team
- 1990–2001: Berkshire

Career statistics
Competition	LA
Matches	9
Runs scored	21
Batting average	7.00
100s/50s	–/–
Top score	16
Balls bowled	492
Wickets	11
Bowling average	38.18
5 wickets in innings	–
10 wickets in match	–
Best bowling	4/31
Catches/stumpings	1/–
- Source: Cricinfo, 25 September 2010

James Keith Barrow (born 16 December 1964) is a former English cricketer. Barrow was a right-handed batsman who bowled right-arm fast-medium. He was born at Haslemere, Surrey.

Barrow made his Minor Counties Championship debut for Berkshire in 1990 against Cornwall. From 1990 to 2000, he represented the county in 57 Minor Counties Championship matches, the last of which came in the 2000 Championship when Berkshire played Oxfordshire. Barrow also played in the MCCA Knockout Trophy for Berkshire. His debut in that competition came in 1992 when Berkshire played Buckinghamshire. From 1992 to 2000, he represented the county in 20 Trophy matches, the last of which came when Berkshire played Herefordshire in the 2000 MCCA Knockout Trophy.

Additionally, he also played List-A matches for Berkshire. His List-A debut for the county came against Kent in the 1994 NatWest Trophy. From 1994 to 2001, he represented the county in 9 matches, with his final List-A match coming when Berkshire played Lincolnshire in the 1st round of the 2002 Cheltenham & Gloucester Trophy, which was played in 2001 at Lindum Sports Club Ground, Lincoln. In his 9 matches, he scored 21 runs at a batting average of 7.00, with a high score of 16. With the ball he took 11 wickets at a bowling average of 31.18, with best figures of 4/31.
