= Simon Webb (cricketer) =

English cricketer

Personal information
- Full name: Simon Webb
- Born: 24 September 1981 (age 45); Grimsby, Lincolnshire, England
- Batting: Right-handed

Domestic team information
- Years: Team
- 2001–2007: Lincolnshire

Career statistics
Competition	List A
Matches	2
Runs scored	62
Batting average	62.00
100s/50s	0/1
Top score	55
Catches/stumpings	0/–
- Source: Cricinfo, 23 June 2011

Simon Webb (born 24 September 1981) is a former English cricketer. Webb was a right-handed batsman. He was born in Grimsby, Lincolnshire.

Webb made his debut for Lincolnshire in the 2000 MCCA Knockout Trophy against Cheshire. Webb played Minor counties cricket for Lincolnshire from 2001 to 2007, which included 12 Minor Counties Championship matches and 4 MCCA Knockout Trophy matches. He made his List A debut against Glamorgan in the 3rd round of the 2002 Cheltenham & Gloucester Trophy. In this match, Webb scored 55 runs from 104 balls, before being dismissed by Andrew Davies. He played a further List A match against Cheshire in the 2nd round of the 2003 Cheltenham & Gloucester Trophy which was played in 2002. In this match, he scored an unbeaten 7 runs.
