= Old London Road =

Cricket ground in Suffolk, England

Coordinates: 52°01′44″N 1°04′56″E

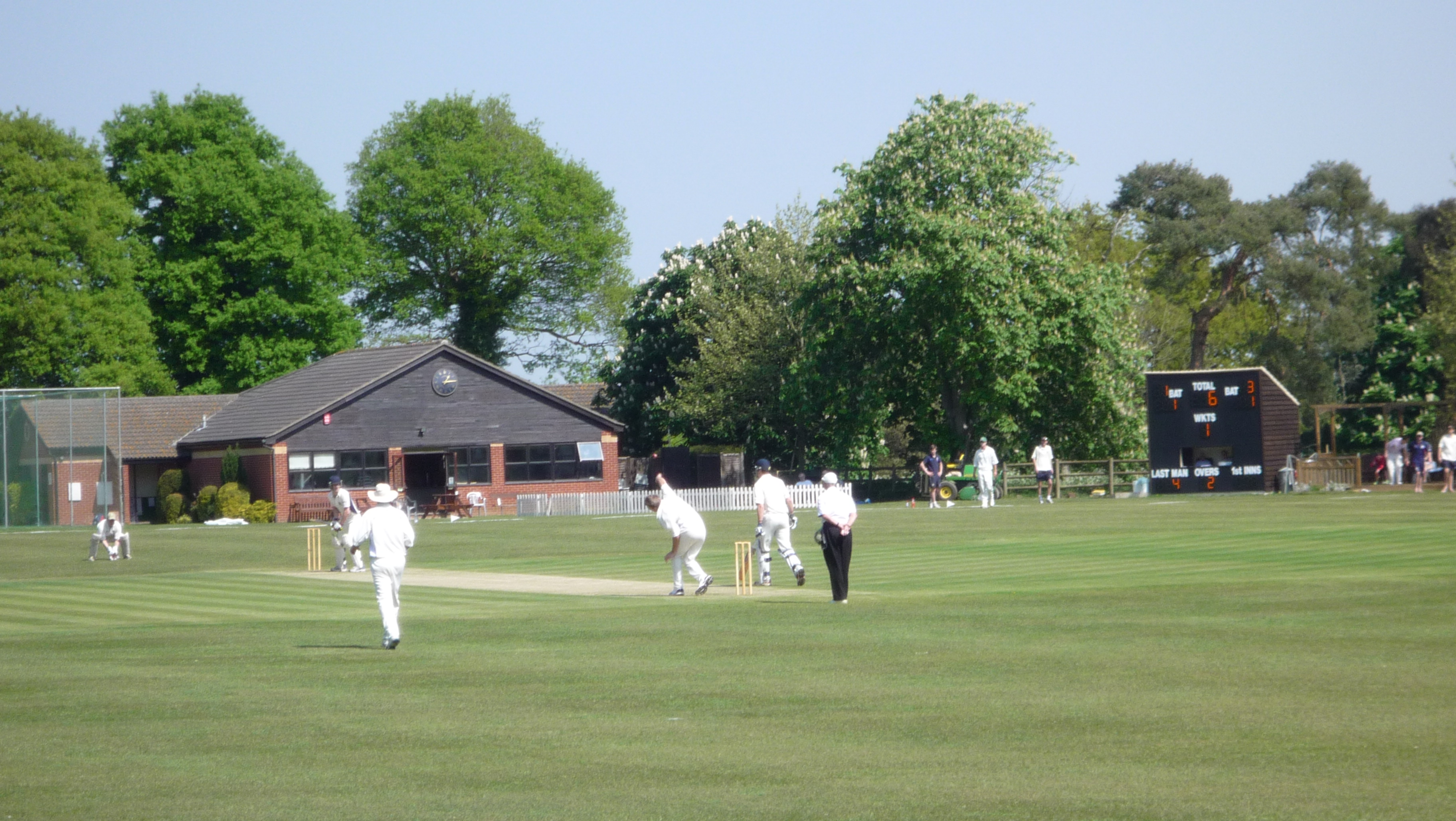

Ground information
- Location: Copdock, Suffolk
- Establishment: 1847 (first recorded match)

Team information
| Suffolk | (1992-2006) |
- As of 13 August 2010; Source: Ground profile

Old London Road is a cricket ground in Copdock, Suffolk. The first recorded match on the ground was in 1847, when the Gentlemen of Suffolk played the Gentlemen of Norfolk. The ground hosted its first Minor Counties Championship match in 1992 when Suffolk played Norfolk. From 1992 to 2006, the ground hosted 5 Minor Counties Championship matches and 8 MCCA Knockout Trophy matches, the last of which saw Suffolk play Norfolk.

The ground has also hosted a single List-A match between Suffolk and Denmark in the 2002 Cheltenham & Gloucester Trophy which was played in 2001.

In local domestic cricket, the ground is the home of Copdock & Old Ipswichian Cricket Club that plays in the East Anglian Premier Cricket League as of 2012.
