= David Clarke (English cricketer) =

English cricketer (born 1967)

Personal information
- Full name: David Robert Clarke
- Born: 26 June 1967 (age 59); Kettering, Northamptonshire
- Batting: Right-handed
- Bowling: Right-arm off break

Domestic team information
- Years: Team
- 1992–2003: Bedfordshire

Career statistics
Competition	List A
Matches	14
Runs scored	514
Batting average	51.40
100s/50s	1/2
Top score	176*
Catches/stumpings	5/–
- Source: Cricinfo, 29 May 2011

David Robert Clarke (born 26 June 1967) is a former English cricketer. Clarke was a right-handed batsman who bowled right-arm off break. He was born in Kettering, Northamptonshire.

Clarke made his debut for Bedfordshire in the 1991 Minor Counties Championship against Lincolnshire. He played Minor counties cricket for Bedfordshire from 1992 to 2003, which included 37 Minor Counties Championship matches and 29 MCCA Knockout Trophy matches. He made his List A debut for Bedfordshire against Warwickshire in the 1994 NatWest Trophy. He played 13 further List A matches for Bedfordshire, the last coming against Cheshire in the 1st round of the 2004 Cheltenham & Gloucester Trophy which was held in 2003. In his 14 matches, Dalton scored 514 runs at a batting average of 51.40. He scored 2 half centuries and made a single century, making an unbeaten score of 176 against the Derbyshire Cricket Board in the 1st round of the 2002 Cheltenham & Gloucester Trophy.
