= Tony Parton =

English cricketer

Personal information
- Full name: Tony Parton
- Born: 12 January 1967 (age 59); Wellington, Shropshire, England
- Batting: Left-handed

Domestic team information
- Years: Team
- 1988–2004: Shropshire

Career statistics
Competition	List A
Matches	9
Runs scored	141
Batting average	17.62
100s/50s	–/1
Top score	51*
Catches/stumpings	4/–
- Source: Cricinfo, 4 July 2011

Tony Parton (born 12 January 1967) is a former English cricketer. Parton was a left-handed batsman. He was born in Wellington, Shropshire.

Parton made his debut for Shropshire in the 1988 MCCA Knockout Trophy against Cheshire. Parton played Minor counties cricket for Shropshire from 1988 to 2004, which included 76 Minor Counties Championship appearances and 21 MCCA Knockout Trophy appearances. He made his List A debut against Hampshire in the 1988 NatWest Trophy. He made 8 further List A appearances, the last of which came against Warwickshire in the 2004 Cheltenham & Gloucester Trophy. In his 9 List A matches, he scored 141 runs at an average of 17.62, with a high score of 51 not out. This score, which was his only List A half century, came against Ireland in the 2000 NatWest Trophy. He has also appeared in Second XIs for Nottinghamshire, Glamorgan, Warwickshire, and Worcestershire.

At club level he has played in Shropshire for Shifnal, Wem, Wellington and Perkins of Shrewsbury, and outside Shropshire for Hampstead (London) and Dumfries (Scotland).
