= Tim Walton (cricketer, born 1972) =

English cricketer

Personal information
- Full name: Timothy Charles Walton
- Born: 8 November 1972 (age 54); York, Yorkshire, England
- Batting: Right-handed
- Bowling: Right-arm medium
- Role: Occasional wicket-keeper

Domestic team information
- Years: Team
- 2001: Cambridgeshire
- 1999: Essex
- 1998/99: Canterbury
- 1992–1998: Northamptonshire

Career statistics
Competition	First-class	List A
Matches	25	94
Runs scored	808	1,498
Batting average	23.76	22.02
100s/50s	–/8	–/7
Top score	71	72
Balls bowled	435	276
Wickets	5	7
Bowling average	62.00	32.00
5 wickets in innings	–	–
10 wickets in match	–	–
Best bowling	1/8	2/27
Catches/stumpings	11/–	26/–
- Source: Cricinfo, 1 December 2011

Timothy Charles Walton (born 8 November 1972) is a former English cricketer. Walton is a right-handed batsman who bowls right-arm medium pace. He was born at York, Yorkshire.

== Youth Internationals ==
Walton made his Youth Test debut for England Under-19s against Pakistan Under-19s during their tour to Pakistan in January/February 1992. He made three Test appearances during the tour, as well as making three Youth One Day International appearances in the subsequent one-day series between the sides. In the same year back in England, he also made two Test appearances against the touring Sri Lanka Under-19s.

== Northamptonshire ==
Walton made his debut for Northamptonshire in a List A match against Leicestershire in the 1992 Sunday League. He made a further appearance in that season's competition against Warwickshire. These were his only appearances for the county that season, while the following season he didn't feature for the county. He next featured in the 1994 AXA Equity & Law League against Nottinghamshire, while in that same season he made his first-class debut, making two appearances in the County Championship against Kent and Somerset. Walton was used by Northamptonshire primarily as a limited-overs player, making 81 List A appearances for the county between 1992 and 1998. In these 81 matches, he scored a total of 1,369 runs at an average of 24.01, with a high score of 72. This score was one of seven half centuries he made and came against Gloucestershire in 1994. An occasional medium pace bowler, he took 7 wickets at a bowling average of 32.00, with best figures of 2/27. He also took 25 catches in the field.

Walton played just 25 first-class matches for Northamptonshire from 1994 to 1997, with his final fixture in that format for the county coming against Warwickshire. In his 25 matches, he scored 653 runs at an average of 25.11, with a high score of 71, one of seven first-class half centuries he made for the county. He left Northamptonshire at the end of the 1998 season.

== Later career ==
Having left Northamptonshire at the end of 1998 season, following that Walton played List A cricket in New Zealand for Canterbury, making four appearances for the team in the 1998/99 Shell Cup, scoring 42 runs at an average of 14.00, with a high score of 17. He signed for Essex for the 1999 season, making his debut for the county in a List A match against Lancashire in the CGU National League. In what was his only season with the county, he made seven further List A appearances, scoring a total of 83 runs at an average of 11.85, with a high score of 23. His first-class debut for the county came against Gloucestershire in that season's County Championship, with Walton making five further first-class appearances, the last of which came against the touring New Zealanders. In his six first-class appearances that season, he scored a total of 155 runs at an average of 19.37, with a high score of 71, which came on debut against Gloucestershire.

Having been released by Essex at the end of the 1999 season, he later played a single List A match for Cambridgeshire against the Warwickshire Cricket Board in the 2nd round of 2002 Cheltenham & Gloucester Trophy which was played in 2001 to avoid fixture congestion the following season. In this match, he scored 4 runs before retiring out. The Warwickshire Cricket Board won the match by 75 runs. He didn't feature in any Minor counties fixtures for Cambridgeshire.
