= Chris Warn =

English cricketer (born 1979)

Christopher Warn (born 22 April 1979) is an English former cricketer. He was a right-handed batsman and wicket-keeper who played for Derbyshire. He was born in Little Waltham.

Warn made a single first-class appearance for the team, against the touring Indians in 2002. From the tailend, he scored a single run in the only innings in which he batted.

Warn made seven List A appearances in the C&G Trophy for Suffolk between 2001 and 2005.
