= Jonathan Trower =

English cricketer

Personal information
- Full name: Jonathan Trower
- Born: 12 June 1979 (age 47); Sheffield, Yorkshire, England
- Batting: Right-handed
- Bowling: Leg break

Domestic team information
- Years: Team
- 2009: Norfolk
- 2008: Berkshire
- 2000–2007: Lincolnshire

Career statistics
Competition	List A
Matches	10
Runs scored	219
Batting average	24.33
100s/50s	–/2
Top score	76
Balls bowled	24
Wickets	–
Bowling average	–
5 wickets in innings	–
10 wickets in match	–
Best bowling	–
Catches/stumpings	2/–
- Source: Cricinfo, 23 June 2011

Jonathan Trower (born 12 June 1979) is an English cricketer. Trower is a right-handed batsman who bowls leg break. He was born in Sheffield, Yorkshire.

Trower made his debut for Lincolnshire in the 2000 Minor Counties Championship against Cumberland. Trower played Minor counties cricket for Lincolnshire from 2000 to 2007, which included 41 Minor Counties Championship matches and 15 MCCA Knockout Trophy matches. He made his List A debut against Cheshire in the 2000 NatWest Trophy. He played 9 further List A matches for Lincolnshire, the last coming against Glamorgan in the 2004 Cheltenham & Gloucester Trophy. In his 10 matches, he scored 219 runs at an average of 24.33. He scored 2 half centuries, with a high score of 76 against Berkshire in the 2002 Cheltenham & Gloucester Trophy.

Leaving Lincolnshire at the end of the 2007 season, Trower has since gone on to play Minor counties cricket for Berkshire in 2008 and Norfolk in 2009.
