= Orleton Park =

Cricket ground in Wellington, Shropshire, England

Coordinates: 52°41′42.82″N 2°32′09.13″W

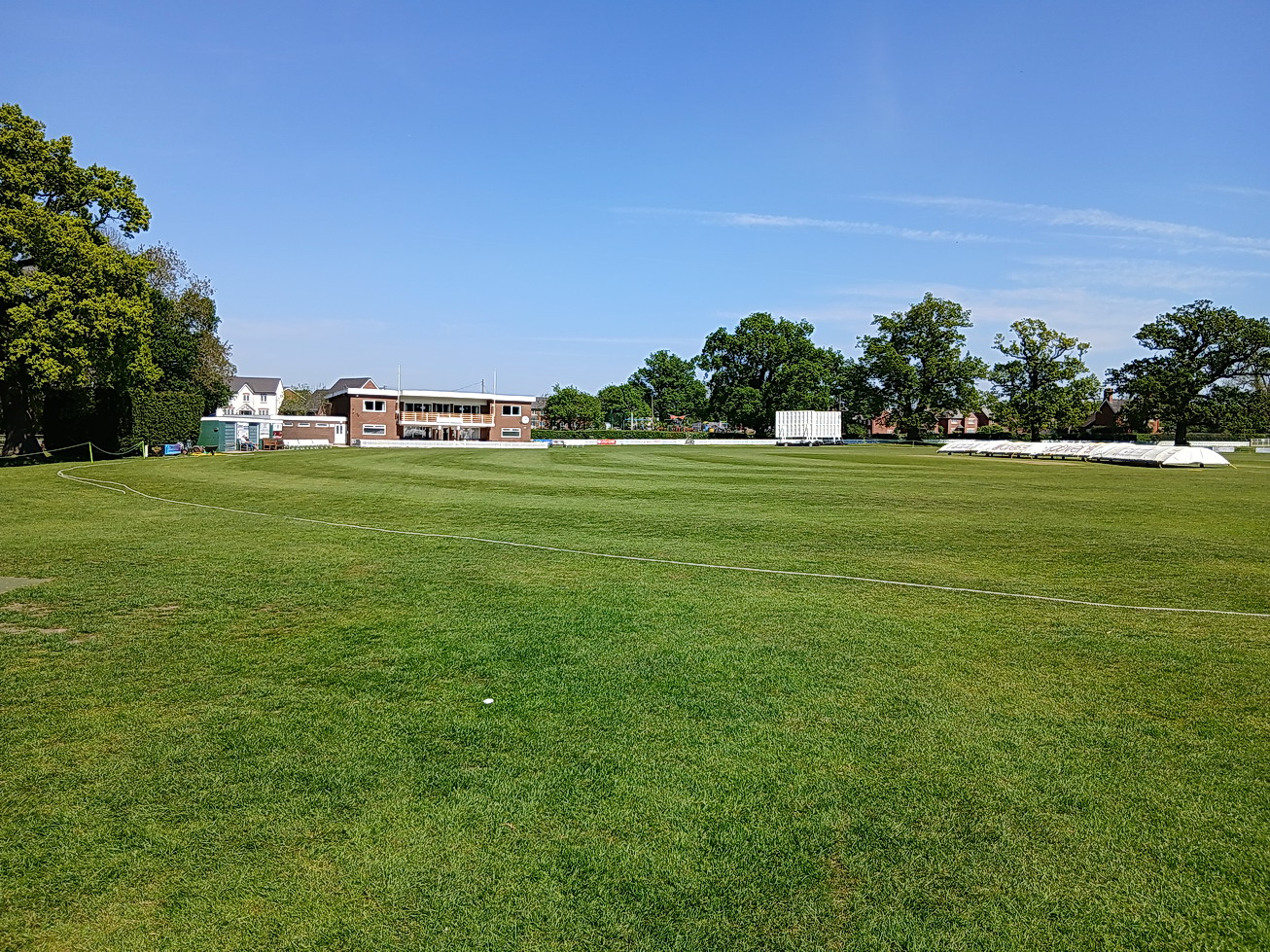

Ground information
- Location: Wellington, Shropshire
- Establishment: 1891

Team information
Shropshire	(1965–2002)
- As of 23 May 2010; Source: Ground profile

Orleton Park is a cricket ground in Wellington, Shropshire. The ground was established in 1891, when Shropshire played a non first-class match against Worcestershire. It is now home to Wellington Cricket Club whose first team are in the Shropshire Premier League. Peter Byram was groundsman who since his death has been replaced by Steven Gough.

The first Minor Counties Championship match played on the ground was in 1965 between Shropshire and Bedfordshire. From 1965 to 2001 the ground hosted 36 Minor Counties matches, with the last being against Shropshire and Berkshire.

In 1979, the ground hosted its only first-class match to date between a combined Minor Counties team and the touring India national cricket team.

The first List-A match played on the ground came in the 1974 Gillette Cup between Shropshire and Essex. From 1974 to 1999, the ground eight five List-A matches, the last of which came in the 1999 NatWest Trophy between Shropshire and the Hampshire Cricket Board.

The ground has also played host to two international matches. Firstly in the 1979 ICC Trophy between Denmark and Fiji and again between the same sides in the 1986 ICC Trophy.

In local domestic cricket, Orleton Park is the home ground of Wellington Cricket Club who play in the Birmingham and District Premier League.
