= Neil Stanley =

English cricketer (1968–2024)

Personal information
- Full name: Neil Alan Stanley
- Born: 16 May 1968; Bedford, Bedfordshire, England
- Died: 7 August 2024 (aged 56)
- Batting: Right-handed
- Bowling: Right-arm medium

Domestic team information
- Years: Team
- 1987–1989: Bedfordshire
- 1988–1993: Northamptonshire
- 1994–2003: Bedfordshire

Career statistics
Competition	First-class	List A
Matches	21	28
Runs scored	1,019	398
Batting average	32.87	18.09
100s/50s	1/7	0/2
Top score	132	69
Balls bowled	60	354
Wickets	0	10
Bowling average	–	27.80
5 wickets in innings	–	0
10 wickets in match	–	0
Best bowling	–	3/48
Catches/stumpings	9/–	9/–
- Source: Cricinfo, 24 September 2011

Neil Alan Stanley (16 May 1968 – 7 August 2024) was an English cricketer. Stanley was a right-handed batsman who bowled right-arm medium pace. He was born in Bedford and educated at Bedford Modern School.

Stanley made his debut in county cricket for Bedfordshire in the 1987 Minor Counties Championship. He made four appearances in 1987, and an appearance each in MCCA Knockout Trophy in 1988 and 1989. In 1988, he played three Youth One Day Internationals for England Young Cricketers, making an appearance each against Australia Young Cricketers, Pakistan Young Cricketers and New Zealand Young Cricketers.

Stanley made his first-class debut for Northamptonshire against Oxford University in 1988. He made twenty further first-class appearances for the county, the last of which came against Surrey in the 1992 County Championship. In his twenty-one first-class matches, he scored 1,019 runs at an average of 32.87, with a high score of 132. This score, which was his only first-class century, came against Lancashire in a partnership worth 236 runs with Allan Lamb. His List A debut for Northamptonshire came against Yorkshire in the 1988 Benson & Hedges Cup. He made fourteen further List A appearances for the county, the last of which came against Somerset in the 1993 AXA Equity & Law League. In his fifteen appearances in that format for Northamptonshire, Stanley scored 103 runs at an average of 10.30, with a high score of 18. He left Northamptonshire at the end of the 1993 season.

He rejoined his native county for the 1994 season, playing Minor counties cricket for Bedfordshire from 1994 to 2002, making a further 36 Minor Counties Championship and 30 MCCA Knockout Trophy appearances. He made his first List A appearance for Bedfordshire in the 1994 NatWest Trophy against Warwickshire. He made twelve further List A appearances for his home county, the last of which came against Warwickshire in the 2003 Cheltenham & Gloucester Trophy. In his thirteen List A appearances, he scored 295 runs at an average of 24.58, with a high score of 69. This score, one of two fifties he made in that format for Bedfordshire, came against Devon in the 2002 Cheltenham & Gloucester Trophy. With the ball, he took 9 wickets at a bowling average of 30.55, with best figures of 3/48.

Stanley died on 7 August 2024, at the age of 56.
