= Ryan Minter =

English cricketer

Personal information
- Full name: Ryan James Minter
- Born: 24 September 1979 (age 47); Canterbury, Kent
- Batting: Right-handed
- Bowling: Right-arm medium-fast

Domestic team information
- Years: Team
- 2001–2002: Kent Cricket Board

Career statistics
Competition	List A
Matches	2
Runs scored	1
Batting average	1.00
100s/50s	0/0
Top score	1
Balls bowled	90
Wickets	7
Bowling average	6.42
5 wickets in innings	1
10 wickets in match	0
Best bowling	6/8
Catches/stumpings	0/–
- Source: CricInfo, 12 November 2010

Ryan James Minter (born 24 September 1979) is a former English cricketer. Minter is a right-handed batsman who bowls right-arm medium-fast. He was born at Canterbury in Kent.

Minter represented the Kent Cricket Board in 2 List A cricket matches. These both came against Leicestershire Cricket Board first in September 2001 in the 2nd round of the 2002 Cheltenham & Gloucester Trophy and again in September 2002 in the 2nd round of the 2003 Cheltenham & Gloucester Trophy. He took seven wickets at a bowling average of 6.42, with best figures of six wickets for eight runs in the first match.

He also played club cricket for Canterbury Cricket Club in the Kent Cricket League.
