= Stuart Davidson (cricketer) =

Zimbabwean-born Scottish cricketer

Personal information
- Full name: Stuart James Davidson
- Born: 8 March 1972 (age 54); Salisbury, Rhodesia (today Harare, Zimbabwe)
- Batting: Right-handed
- Bowling: Right-arm medium

Domestic team information
- Years: Team
- 2001–2002: Scotland

Career statistics
Competition	List A
Matches	3
Runs scored	5
Batting average	–
100s/50s	–/–
Top score	5*
Balls bowled	144
Wickets	7
Bowling average	12.14
5 wickets in innings	–
10 wickets in match	–
Best bowling	4/43
Catches/stumpings	–/–
- Source: Cricinfo, 31 October 2011

Stuart James Davidson (born 8 March 1972) is a Zimbabwean-born former Scottish cricketer. Davidson was a right-handed batsman who bowled right-arm medium pace.

Davidson made his List A debut for Scotland against the Middlesex Cricket Board in the 1st round of the 2002 Cheltenham & Gloucester Trophy which was played in 2001 to avoid fixture congestion the following season. Scotland won this match to proceed to the 2nd round which was also held in 2001, where they played Dorset. Davidson's third and final List A appearance for Scotland came in the 3rd round of the same competition against Surrey, this time played in 2002. A bowler, he took 7 wickets in his three matches at an average of 12.14, with best figures of 4/43.
