= Benjamin Thompson (cricketer) =

English cricketer

Personal information
- Full name: Benjamin John Thompson
- Born: 3 December 1980 (age 45); Oxford, Oxfordshire, England
- Batting: Right-handed
- Bowling: Right-arm off break

Domestic team information
- Years: Team
- 1998–2004: Oxfordshire

Career statistics
Competition	List A
Matches	4
Runs scored	129
Batting average	32.25
100s/50s	–/–
Top score	42
Balls bowled	42
Wickets	2
Bowling average	18.00
5 wickets in innings	–
10 wickets in match	–
Best bowling	2/36
Catches/stumpings	–/–
- Source: Cricinfo, 20 May 2011

Benjamin John Thompson (born 3 October 1980) is a former English cricketer. Thompson was a right-handed batsman who bowled off break. He was born in Oxford, Oxfordshire.

Thompson made his debut for Oxfordshire in the 1998 MCCA Knockout Trophy against Huntingdonshire. Thompson played Minor counties cricket for Oxfordshire from 1998 to 2004, which included 23 Minor Counties Championship matches and 15 MCCA Knockout Trophy matches. He made his List A debut against the Durham Cricket Board in the 1999 NatWest Trophy. He played 3 further List A matches, the last coming against Shropshire in the 2nd round of the 2002 Cheltenham & Gloucester Trophy which was held in 2001. In his 4 List A matches he scored 129 runs at a batting average of 32.25, with a high score of 42. With the ball, he took 2 wickets at a bowling average of 18.00, with best figures of 2/36.

He has previously played for the Middlesex Second XI.
