= Boghall Cricket Club Ground =

Cricket ground in Scotland

Coordinates: 55°58′43.37″N 03°35′07.76″W

- The BCG
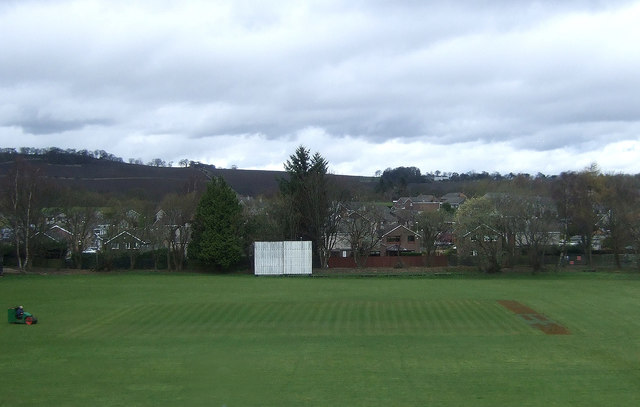
- Interactive map of Boghall Cricket Club Ground

Ground information
- Location: Linlithgow, Scotland
- Country: Scotland
- Establishment: 1969 (first recorded match)

Team information
Scotland	(1995–2001)
- As of 19 October 2011; Source: Ground profile

Boghall Cricket Club Ground is a cricket ground in Linlithgow, Scotland. The first recorded match held on the ground came in 1969 when West Lothian played Edinburgh Academicals. Between 1995 and 1998 the ground hosted a number of touring teams in minor matches, which included matches against the Netherlands, Denmark and the touring Bangladeshis. The ground held its first first-class match when Scotland played against Ireland in 1996. Two further first-class matches were played there, one in 1998 when Scotland played Australia A, and another in 1999 when Scotland played South Africa Academy. The ground held its first List A match when Scotland played Yorkshire in the 1998 Benson & Hedges Cup. The following year Scotland played another List A match against the Nottinghamshire Cricket Board in the NatWest Trophy. The third and to date final List A match played at the ground came in the 2002 Cheltenham & Gloucester Trophy against Dorset. The ground is still used today by Linlithgow Cricket Club.
