= Wilton Park, Beaconsfield =

Cricket ground in Beaconsfield, Buckinghamshire

Coordinates: 51.60242°N 0.62939°W

Wilton Park
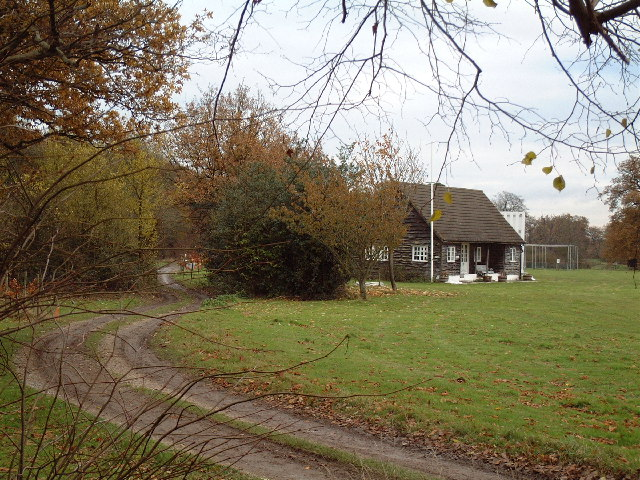

Ground information
- Location: Beaconsfield, Buckinghamshire
- Establishment: 1942 (first recorded match)

International information
- First WODI: 24 July 1993: India v Netherlands
- Last WODI: 11 August 2002: England v India

Team information
Buckinghamshire	(1967–1975 & 1989–2005)
- As of 6 September 2020; Source: Ground profile

Wilton Park is a cricket ground in Beaconsfield, Buckinghamshire. The first recorded match on the ground was in 1942, when Beaconsfield played Captain Alan Parker's XII. The first Minor Counties Championship match played on the ground came when Buckinghamshire played Norfolk in 1967. From 1967 to 1975 and 1989 to 2005 the ground has hosted 26 Minor Counties Championship matches, the last of which saw Buckinghamshire play Staffordshire. The ground has also held four MCCA Knockout Trophy matches, the last of which saw Buckinghamshire play Wiltshire in 2005.

The ground has also held List-A matches. The first List-A match held on the ground was between Buckinghamshire and Sussex in the 1992 NatWest Trophy. Between 1992 and 2002, the ground played host to five List-A matches, the last of which saw Buckinghamshire play Shropshire in the second round of the 2003 Cheltenham & Gloucester Trophy which was played in 2003.

Wilton Park has also been a venue for Women's One Day International's. The first Women's ODI saw India women play Netherlands women in the 1993 Women's Cricket World Cup.

In local domestic cricket, the ground is the home venue of Beaconsfield Cricket Club who play in the Home Counties Premier Cricket League.
