= Carl Amos =

English cricketer

Personal information
- Born: 30 March 1973 (age 53); King's Lynn, Norfolk
- Batting: Left-handed

Domestic team information
- Years: Team
- 1994–2003: Norfolk County Cricket Club

Career statistics
Competition	List A
Matches	13
Runs scored	233
Batting average	17.92
100s/50s	0/1
Top score	76
Catches/stumpings	5/–
- Source: CricInfo, 9 August 2008

Carl Amos (born 30 March 1973) is an English cricketer who has played his 13 List A games for Norfolk County Cricket Club. His highest score of 76 came when playing for Norfolk in a match against Surrey Cricket Board.

He has also played 97 Minor Counties Championship games and 52 Minor Counties Trophy Matches for Norfolk.
