= Huw Jones (cricketer) =

English cricketer

Personal information
- Full name: Huw Rhys Jones
- Born: 23 November 1980 (age 45); Oxford, Oxfordshire, England
- Batting: Right-handed
- Bowling: Leg break

Domestic team information
- Years: Team
- 2008-2009: Herefordshire
- 2002: Warwickshire
- 2001-2002: Warwickshire Cricket Board
- 2001-2003: Oxford University

Career statistics
Competition	FC	LA
Matches	8	3
Runs scored	304	88
Batting average	23.38	29.33
100s/50s	–/2	–/1
Top score	97	72
Balls bowled	–	–
Wickets	–	–
Bowling average	–	–
5 wickets in innings	–	–
10 wickets in match	–	–
Best bowling	–	–
Catches/stumpings	6/–	–/–
- Source: Cricinfo, 25 October 2010

Huw Rhys Jones (born 23 November 1980) is an English cricketer. Jones is a right-handed batsman who bowls right-arm leg break. He was born at Oxford, Oxfordshire.

Jones made his debut in first-class cricket for Oxford University against Middlesex in 2001. From 2001 to 2003, he represented the county in 8 first-class matches, the last of which came against Hampshire. In his 8 first-class matches, he scored 304 runs at a batting average of 23.38, with 2 half centuries and a high score of 97. In the field he took 6 catches.

Jones later represented the Warwickshire Cricket Board in 2 List A matches against Cambridgeshire in the 2nd round of the 2002 Cheltenham & Gloucester Trophy which was held in 2001. His second List A match for the board came against Leicestershire in the 2nd round of the same competition which was held in 2002. Also in 2002, Jones played his only List A match for Warwickshire against Glamorgan. In his 3 List A matches, he scored 88 runs at an average of 29.33, with a single half century high score of 72.

In 2008, he joined Herefordshire. His debut for the county came in the 2008 MCCA Knockout Trophy against Cornwall. He played 5 further Trophy matches for the county, the last of which came against Berkshire in 2009.

He currently plays club cricket for Moseley Cricket Club in the Birmingham and District Premier League.
