= Darren Scott (cricketer) =

Personal information
- Full name: Darren Anthony Scott
- Born: 26 August 1972 (age 54); Canterbury, Kent
- Batting: Left-handed
- Bowling: Right-arm off break

Domestic team information
- Years: Team
- 1998–2000: Kent
- 2002: Kent Cricket Board

Career statistics
| Competition | First-class | List A |
|---|---|---|
| Matches | 8 | 5 |
| Runs scored | 46 | 34 |
| Batting average | 23.00 | 17.00 |
| 100s/50s | 0/0 | 0/0 |
| Top score | 17* | 27 |
| Balls bowled | 1,202 | 171 |
| Wickets | 13 | 6 |
| Bowling average | 47.15 | 26.33 |
| 5 wickets in innings | 0 | 0 |
| 10 wickets in match | 0 | 0 |
| Best bowling | 4/151 | 3/21 |
| Catches/stumpings | 3/– | 1/– |
- Source: Cricinfo, 12 November 2010

Darren Anthony Scott (born 26 August 1972) is an English former professional cricketer. Scott played for Kent County Cricket Club as a left-handed batsman who bowled off break deliveries. He was born at Canterbury in Kent in 1972.

After first playing for Kent's Second XI in 1995, Scott made his first-class cricket debut for the county against Oxford University in June 1998. His County Championship debut came in the final match of the 1998 season against Warwickshire. From 1998 to 2000 he played in eight first-class matches, the last of which came against Leicestershire, and in four List A matches.

In 2002 Scott played for the Kent Cricket Board in a single List A match against Hampshire in the 2002 Cheltenham & Gloucester Trophy. He made five appearances for the Board in the Minor Counties Trophy between 1998 and 2000 and played club cricket for St Lawrence and Highland Court and for Lordswood Cricket Club in the Kent Cricket League. Since leaving the professional game, Scott has taught Physical Education and has been involved with cricket coaching, including with Kent's Academy programme. As of 2018, he is Kent College's Director of Cricket.
