= Darren Cousins =

English cricketer

Personal information
- Full name: Darren Mark Cousins
- Born: 24 September 1971 (age 55); Cambridge, England
- Batting: Right-handed
- Bowling: Right-arm medium-fast
- Role: Bowler

Domestic team information
- Years: Team
- 1992–1998: Essex
- 1999: Cambridgeshire
- 1999: Surrey
- 2000–2003: Northamptonshire

Career statistics
Competition	First-class	LA
Matches	50	95
Runs scored	559	190
Batting average	10.75	7.91
100s/50s	0/0	0/0
Top score	29*	21
Balls bowled	8,914	4,228
Wickets	152	120
Bowling average	30.63	26.07
5 wickets in innings	4	1
10 wickets in match	0	0
Best bowling	8/102	5/22
Catches/stumpings	12/–	20/–
- Source: CricketArchive, 13 June 2010

Darren Mark Cousins (born 24 September 1971) is a former professional English cricketer. He was a right-handed batsman and a right-arm medium-fast bowler who used to play for Essex, Northamptonshire, Surrey and Cambridgeshire. His contract was terminated in 2003 after fracturing his navicular whilst playing for Northamptonshire.

His father Dennis Cousins played List A cricket for Cambridgeshire in one match in 1972.
