= Wellington Cricket Club =

Wellington Cricket Club is an amateur cricket club in Wellington, near Telford in Shropshire. Their 1st XI play in the Shropshire premier division

They play their home games at Orleton Park in Wellington, which has also been used for one first-class match between the Minor Counties and the Indian tourists in 1979 and for Minor Counties and List A matches played by Shropshire County Cricket Club.

== Teams ==
Wellington CC has 6 senior Men's teams and a Ladies team as well as a thriving junior section.

Management Structure: President: Charles Bathurst, Chairman: Steven Oliver Secretary: David Ross, Cricket Chairman: Simon Topper, Club Captain: Matt Stinson, Safeguarding Officer: Jennie Good

Senior Team Captains: Mens 1XI: Dan Vaughan - BDPCL Premier Division, Mens 2XI: Matt Stinson - SCCL Division 1, Mens 3XI: Simon Topper - SCCL Division 2, Mens 4XI: David Morris - SCCL Division 5, Mens 5XI: Steven Oliver Ladies 1XI: Hannah Young Ladies 2XI:

== Notable players ==
- Joseph Smith - represented Shropshire at Minor Counties level 1968-88
- Richard Cousins, businessman - played for club 2nd XI in late 1980s and sometime club committee chairman.
- Tony Parton – represented Shropshire 1988–2004
- Guy Home – represented Shropshire 1991–2006
- Adam Byram – represented Shropshire 1989–2002 and Staffordshire 2003
- Gavin Byram, his brother – represented Shropshire 1992–2002
