= Marc Symington =

English cricketer (born 1980)

Marc Joseph Symington (born 10 January 1980) is an English cricketer. Born in Newcastle upon Tyne, Marc is 5’8" and he is a right-handed batsman and a right-arm pace bowler. He played first-class and List A cricket for Durham between 1998 and 2002, and later appeared in Minor Counties and List A games for Northumberland.
