= Kevin Shaw =

English cricketer (born 1971)

Personal information
- Full name: Kevin George Shaw
- Born: 30 April 1971 (age 55); Bury St Edmunds, Suffolk, England
- Batting: Right-handed
- Bowling: Right-arm medium

Domestic team information
- Years: Team
- 1996–2002: Suffolk

Career statistics
Competition	List A
Matches	3
Runs scored	34
Batting average	34.00
100s/50s	–/–
Top score	34*
Balls bowled	66
Wickets	3
Bowling average	27.33
5 wickets in innings	–
10 wickets in match	–
Best bowling	2/79
Catches/stumpings	2/–
- Source: Cricinfo, 5 July 2011

Kevin George Shaw (born 30 April 1971) is a former English cricketer. Shaw was a right-handed batsman who bowled right-arm medium pace. He was born in Bury St Edmunds, Suffolk.

Shaw made his debut for Suffolk in the 1996 MCCA Knockout Trophy against Cambridgeshire. Shaw played Minor counties cricket for Suffolk from 1996 to 2002, which has included 38 Minor Counties Championship appearances and 16 MCCA Knockout Trophy matches. He made his List A debut against Lincolnshire in the 1st round of the 2001 Cheltenham & Gloucester Trophy. He made 2 further List A appearances, against Northamptonshire in the 3rd round of the 2002 Cheltenham & Gloucester Trophy, and Buckinghamshire in the 1st round of the 2003 Cheltenham & Gloucester Trophy, which was held in 2002. In his 3 List A matches, he scored 34 runs, while with the ball, he took 3 wickets at a bowling average of 27.33, with best figures of 2/79.

Shaw was appointed Master in charge of Cricket at South London independent school Dulwich College in January 2012, working alongside Former England International Bill Athey, who has been Head Coach there since 2001.

In March 2013 it was announced that Shaw will leave Dulwich in London to become Director of Sport at their sister school in Singapore from August 2014.
