= Graeme Angus =

English cricketer

Personal information
- Born: 17 May 1971 (age 55); Newcastle upon Tyne, England
- Batting: Right-handed
- Bowling: Right-arm fast-medium

Domestic team information
- Years: Team
- 1994: Northumberland County Cricket Club

Career statistics
Competition	LA
Matches	7
Runs scored	21
Batting average	5.25
100s/50s	0/0
Top score	10
Balls bowled	414
Wickets	10
Bowling average	29.70
5 wickets in innings	0
10 wickets in match	0
Best bowling	2/25
Catches/stumpings	6/–
- Source: CricketArchive, 14 August 2008

Graeme Angus (born 17 May 1971) is an English cricketer who played for Northumberland County Cricket Club. His highest score of 10 came when playing for Northumberland in the match against Nottinghamshire. His best bowling of 2/25 came when playing for Northumberland in the match against Staffordshire.

He played 64 Minor Counties Championship games for Northumberland, and 20 games for Northumberland in the Minor Counties Trophy.

Also he played 4 games in the Second Eleven Championship.
