= Derek Kenway =

English cricketer (born 1978)

Personal information
- Full name: Derek Anthony Kenway
- Born: 12 June 1978 (age 48); Fareham, Hampshire, England
- Batting: Right-handed
- Bowling: Right-arm medium
- Role: Occasional wicket-keeper
- Relatives: Richard Kenway (brother)

Domestic team information
- Years: Team
- 1997–2005: Hampshire

Career statistics
| Competition | FC | LA | T20 |
|---|---|---|---|
| Matches | 93 | 110 | 10 |
| Runs scored | 4,382 | 2,616 | 134 |
| Batting average | 29.60 | 26.16 | 14.88 |
| 100s/50s | 7/20 | 2/15 | 0/0 |
| Top score | 166 | 120* | 40 |
| Balls bowled | 150 | 17 | – |
| Wickets | 4 | 1 | – |
| Bowling average | 39.75 | 16.00 | – |
| 5 wickets in innings | 0 | 0 | – |
| 10 wickets in match | 0 | 0 | – |
| Best bowling | 1/5 | 1/16 | – |
| Catches/stumpings | 85/1 | 60/7 | 4/3 |
- Source: Cricinfo, 12 August 2009

Derek Anthony Kenway (born 12 June 1978) is an English cricketer. He is a right-handed batsman who bowls right-arm medium pace, who can also play as a wicketkeeper.

== First-class debut and early career ==
Born in Fareham, Kenway made his first-class debut for home county Hampshire in the 1997 County Championship. The following season he made his List A one-day debut against Glamorgan in the 1998 AXA League. In 1999, he passed 1,000 first-class runs for the season, the only time he would do so in his career, and also scored his maiden first-class century. By 2001, Kenway was firmly established in the Hampshire team, having had some success as a batsman for the county. Following strong performances in first-class and List A cricket in 2001, Kenway was Hampshire Cricket Society Player of the Year.

His early promise saw him touted as a future England player, leading to his inclusion in the inaugural ECB National Academy tour to Australia in the winter of 2001. Included on this tour were future, and in some cases current, England internationals Andrew Flintoff, Andrew Strauss, Simon Jones, and Hampshire teammate Chris Tremlett. It was during this period that Kenway was considered at his fittest physically, something he was often cited as having little of during his career.

== Decline in form and release ==
Despite the early promise, Kenway's career proceeded to fall away following his academy call-up and tour to Australia. In the proceeding four seasons, his first-class average was around the mid-twenties. His one-day form was slightly more consistent, scoring 533 runs from 17 matches and hitting his maiden one-day century against Somerset, before following that up a few matches later with an unbeaten 120 against the touring Zimbabweans.

By 2002, he had featured less for Hampshire than he had desired. This followed a poor season in which he was dropped by Hampshire after scoring just 238 runs at an average of 18.30; this was despite being cited at the beginning of the year as a possible England call-up. Kenway cited the poor state of the then new Rose Bowl pitches for his poor form, stating that they made batting difficult. Indeed, by the end of that season, Kenway had made a request to leave the club, which director of cricket Tim Tremlett announced the club had "reluctantly" agreed to do so. A number of clubs, including Derbyshire, Sussex, and Nottinghamshire were interested in signing him, but no move was forthcoming. In an about turn, he reversed his decision to leave the county and made himself available for the 2003 season.

Over the coming seasons, his performances were inconsistent, and his first team opportunities became more limited as Hampshire began to strengthen their squad, with the arrival of players like the South African Nic Pothas. He did make his debut in the new Twenty20 format against Sussex in the 2003 Twenty20 Cup, which was Hampshire's first Twenty20 match. Kenway further struggled for form in this new format, scoring just 134 runs at an average of 14.88 in 10 matches. Come the 2005 season, Kenway played just a single first-class match, but was a member of the 2005 Cheltenham & Gloucester Trophy winning side, playing a single match in the 1st round of the competition against Shropshire.

He was released at the end of the 2005 season, alongside Lawrence Prittipaul. Then team manager, Paul Terry, stating that "some younger players have overtaken them". By the time of his release, Kenway had scored 4,382 first-class runs at an average of 29.60, with 20 half centuries and 7 centuries, with a high score of 166. In the field, he took 85 catches and made a single stumping. In List A cricket, he played 109 matches for the county, scoring 2,597 runs at an average of 26.23, with 15 half centuries and 2 centuries. He took 60 catches, a more frequent keeper in one-day cricket; he made seven stumpings.

== Personal life ==
As of December 2010, Kenway was employed by his families company, Botley Roofing. Kenway still plays cricket at club level for Totton and Eling Cricket Club in the Southern Premier Cricket League. He is married with one daughter. Kenway's brother, Richard, represented the Hampshire Cricket Board in three List A matches in the 2001 and Cheltenham & Gloucester Trophies, both of which were played in 2001.
