= Nicholas Davies (cricketer) =

English cricketer (born 1975)

Personal information
- Full name: Nicholas Mark Davies
- Born: 30 April 1975 (age 51); Bromsgrove, Worcestershire, England
- Batting: Right-handed
- Bowling: Right-arm medium

Domestic team information
- Years: Team
- 1994-1995 1997 & 2001-2005: Herefordshire

Career statistics
Competition	LA
Matches	8
Runs scored	77
Batting average	14.50
100s/50s	–/–
Top score	39*
Balls bowled	349
Wickets	8
Bowling average	31.12
5 wickets in innings	–
10 wickets in match	–
Best bowling	4/72
Catches/stumpings	4/–
- Source: Cricinfo, 25 November 2010

Nicholas Mark Davies (born 30 April 1975) is a former English cricketer. Davies was a right-handed batsman who bowled right-arm medium pace. He was born at Bromsgrove, Worcestershire.

Davies made his debut for Herefordshire in the 1994 Minor Counties Championship against Oxfordshire. From 1994 to 2005, he represented the county in 21 Championship matches, the last of which came against Shropshire. His MCCA Knockout Trophy debut for the county came against Wales Minor Counties in 2001. From 2001 to 2002, he represented the county in 5 Trophy matches, the last of which came against the Worcestershire Cricket Board.

He also represented Herefordshire in List A cricket. His debut List A match came against the Gloucestershire Cricket Board in the 2001 Cheltenham & Gloucester Trophy. From 2001 to 2004, he represented the county in 8 List A matches, the last of which came against Worcestershire in the 2004 Cheltenham & Gloucester Trophy. In his 8 matches, he scored 77 runs at a batting average of 15.40, with a high score of 39*. In the field he took a single catch. With the ball he took 8 wickets at a bowling average of 31.12, with best figures of 4/72.
