= Christopher Budd (cricketer) =

English cricketer (born 1978)

Personal information
- Full name: Christopher Richard John Budd
- Born: 26 December 1978 (age 47); Bristol, England
- Batting: Right-handed
- Bowling: Right-arm off break

Domestic team information
- Years: Team
- 2002–2005: Wiltshire
- 1999–2001: Gloucestershire Cricket Board

Career statistics
Competition	LA
Matches	8
Runs scored	199
Batting average	28.42
100s/50s	–/2
Top score	65
Balls bowled	–
Wickets	–
Bowling average	–
5 wickets in innings	–
10 wickets in match	–
Best bowling	–
Catches/stumpings	5/–
- Source: Cricinfo, 10 October 2010

Christopher Richard John Budd (born 26 December 1978) is a former English cricketer. Budd was a right-handed batsman who bowled right-arm off break. He was born in Bristol.

Budd's first match for the Gloucestershire Cricket Board came in the 1998 MCCA Knockout Trophy against the Somerset Cricket Board. From 1998 to 2001, he represented the county in 14 Trophy matches, the last of which came against Wiltshire. Budd made his debut in List-A cricket for the Gloucestershire Cricket Board in the 1999 NatWest Trophy against the Yorkshire Cricket Board. He represented the Board in 5 List-A matches between 1999 and 2002, the last of which came against the Yorkshire Cricket Board in the 2nd round of the 2002 Cheltenham & Gloucester Trophy which was played in 2001.

Budd made his Minor Counties Championship debut for Wiltshire in 2002 against Dorset. From 2001 to 2005, he represented the county in 13 Minor Counties Championship matches, the last of which came against Oxfordshire. Coles also represented Wiltshire in the MCCA Knockout Trophy making his debut for the county in that competition against the Somerset Cricket Board in 2002. From 2002 to 2004, he represented the county in 7 Trophy matches, the last of which came against Dorset.

Budd also represented Wiltshire in List-A cricket. His List-A debut for the county came against the Hampshire Cricket Board in the 1st round 2003 Cheltenham & Gloucester Trophy which was played in 2002. He represented Wiltshire in 2 further List-A matches against Nottinghamshire in the 2004 Cheltenham & Gloucester Trophy and Kent in the 2005 Cheltenham & Gloucester Trophy. In his combined List-A matches, he scored 199 runs at a batting average of 28.42, with 2 half centuries and a high score of 65. In the field he took 5 catches.

== Later life ==
Budd later became a Physical Education teacher at Backwell School, a post he presently holds.
