= Benjamin Price (cricketer) =

English cricketer (born 1981)

Personal information
- Full name: Benjamin Peter Price
- Born: 17 August 1981 (age 45); Truro, Cornwall, England
- Batting: Right-handed

Domestic team information
- Years: Team
- 1999-2006: Cornwall

Career statistics
Competition	LA
Matches	7
Runs scored	184
Batting average	26.28
100s/50s	–/2
Top score	74
Balls bowled	–
Wickets	–
Bowling average	–
5 wickets in innings	–
10 wickets in match	–
Best bowling	–
Catches/stumpings	2/–
- Source: Cricinfo, 17 October 2010

Benjamin Peter Price (born 17 August 1981) is an English cricketer. Price is a right-handed batsman. He was born at Truro, Cornwall.

Price made his debut for Cornwall in the 1999 MCCA Knockout Trophy against Devon. From 1999 to 2006, he represented the county in 6 Trophy matches, the last of which came against Berkshire. Price also represented Cornwall in the Minor Counties Championship. His debut in that competition came against Dorset in 2000. From 2000 to 2006, he represented the county in 31 Minor Counties Championship matches, the last of which came against Herefordshire.

Price also represented Cornwall in List A cricket. His first List A match came against Cheshire in the 1st round of the 2001 Cheltenham & Gloucester Trophy. From 2001 to 2003, he represented the county in 7 List A matches, the last of which came against the Netherlands in the 1st round of the 2004 Cheltenham & Gloucester Trophy which was played in 2003. In his 7 List A matches, he scored 184 runs at a batting average of 26.28, with 2 half centuries and a high score of 74.

Price currently plays club cricket for Wellington Cricket Club in the Birmingham and District Premier League.
