= Richard Kenway =

English cricketer (born 1975)

Personal information
- Full name: Richard Keith Kenway
- Born: 17 July 1975 (age 51); Southampton, Hampshire
- Batting: Right-handed
- Relatives: Derek Kenway (brother)

Domestic team information
- Years: Team
- 2000–2001: Hampshire Cricket Board

Career statistics
Competition	List A
Matches	2
Runs scored	47
Batting average	47.00
100s/50s	0/0
Top score	47
Catches/stumpings	0/–
- Source: Cricinfo, 28 December 2009

Richard Keith Kenway (born 17 July 1975) is an English cricketer. Kenway is a right-handed batsman. He was born at Southampton, Hampshire.

Kenyway made his debut for the Hampshire Cricket Board (HCB) against the Sussex Cricket Board at Birdham in the 2000 MCCA Knockout Trophy. The following year he made his List A debut for the HCB against the Kent Cricket Board at Mote Park, Maidstone, in the first round of the 2001 Cheltenham & Gloucester Trophy. He wasn't required to bat in the match, which ended with no result due to rain. Later in 2001, he made a second List A appearance for the HCB against Ireland at the Rose Bowl in the first round of the 2002 Cheltenham & Gloucester Trophy, played late in the 2001 season to avoid fixture congestion in 2002. Ireland won the toss and elected to bat first, making 241/7 from their 50 overs. The HCB fell 32 runs short of their target in their chase, with Kenway top-scoring in the innings with 47, before he was dismissed by Kyle McCallan. He continues to play club cricket in Hampshire.

His brother, Derek, played first-class cricket for Hampshire County Cricket Club.
