= Victory Ground, Bury St Edmunds =

Cricket ground in Bury St Edmunds, Suffolk, England

Coordinates: 52.230°N 0.728°E

Victory Ground
- Interactive map of Victory Ground

Ground information
- Location: Bury St Edmunds, Suffolk
- Country: England
- Establishment: 1935

Team information
Suffolk	(1935–present)
- As of 23 May 2010; Source: Ground profile

The Victory Ground is a cricket ground in Bury St Edmunds, Suffolk, England. The ground was established in 1935, when Suffolk played the Surrey Second XI in the ground's first Minor Counties Championship match. From 1935 to the present day, it has hosted 50 Minor Counties matches.

The first List-A match played on the ground came in the 1981 NatWest Trophy between Suffolk and Derbyshire. From 1981 to 2005, the ground hosted ten List-A matches, the last of which saw Suffolk play Glamorgan in the 2005 Cheltenham & Gloucester Trophy.

In local domestic cricket, the Victory Ground is the home of Bury St Edmunds Cricket Club who play in the East Anglian Premier Cricket League.
