= Tom Mees (cricketer) =

English cricketer

Tom Mees (born 8 June 1981) is an English cricketer. He is a right-handed batsman and a right-arm medium-fast bowler. He was born in Wolverhampton.

On Mees' debut against Middlesex, in 2001, he bowled an innings of 6/64 for Oxford UCCE. In 2002, Mees toured South Africa and played against Zimbabwe in 2005.

In July 2005, Mees cut ties with Warwickshire, after suffering from a recurring ankle injury.

In September 2013, Mees swam the English Channel with his partner, Emma Lawson, and Adam Shantry in memory of cricketer Tom Maynard, who died in 2012. He hopes to raise £10,000 for the Tom Maynard Trust.
