= Bjarne Jensen (umpire) =

Danish cricket umpire (born 1958)

Bjarne Kofoed Jensen (born 1958) is a Danish cricket umpire. Jensen's first major umpiring duties came in 1989, when England women played two matches in Denmark at the Nykøbing Mors Cricket Club Ground against the Netherlands women and Ireland women, in matches which had Women's One Day International status. Over a decade later, he stood in two List A matches in men's cricket in English domestic cricket, the first in a match in the 2002 Cheltenham & Gloucester Trophy between Hertfordshire and Staffordshire, while the second in the 2003 Cheltenham & Gloucester Trophy between Northumberland and the Yorkshire Cricket Board.
