= Ben Frazer =

English cricketer

Personal information
- Full name: Benjamin James Frazer
- Born: 2 April 1981 (age 45); Truro, Cornwall, England
- Batting: Right-handed
- Bowling: Right-arm off break

Domestic team information
- Years: Team
- 2000–2019: Hertfordshire

Career statistics
Competition	List A
Matches	5
Runs scored	74
Batting average	14.80
100s/50s	0/0
Top score	24
Balls bowled	222
Wickets	7
Bowling average	30.71
5 wickets in innings	0
10 wickets in match	0
Best bowling	3/56
Catches/stumpings	3/–
- Source: Cricinfo, 6 June 2011

Benjamin James Frazer (born 2 April 1981) is an English cricketer. Frazer is a right-handed batsman who bowls right-arm off break. He was born in Truro, Cornwall.

Frazer made his debut for Hertfordshire in the 2000 MCCA Knockout Trophy against the Essex Cricket Board. He played Minor counties cricket for Hertfordshire from 2000 to 2019, including 62 Minor Counties Championship matches and 68 MCCA Knockout Trophy matches. In 2001, he made his List A debut against the Durham Cricket Board in the Cheltenham & Gloucester Trophy. He made 4 further List A appearances for the county, the last coming against Ireland in the 1st round of the 2004 Cheltenham & Gloucester Trophy, which was held in 2003. In his 5 List A matches, he scored 74 runs at a batting average of 14.80, with a high score of 24. With the ball, he took 7 wickets at a bowling average of 30.71, with best figures of 3/56.

He played for the Middlesex Second XI in 2001.
