= Graeme Archer (cricketer) =

English cricketer

Personal information
- Full name: Graeme Francis Archer
- Born: 26 September 1970 (age 56); Carlisle, England
- Batting: Right handed
- Bowling: Right-arm fast-medium

Domestic team information
- Years: Team
- 1992–1999: Nottinghamshire
- 2000–2004: Staffordshire
- FC debut: 7 May 1992 Nottinghamshire v Oxford University
- Last FC: 9 September 1999 Nottinghamshire v Sussex
- List A debut: 19 July 1992 Nottinghamshire v Durham
- Last List A: 5 May 2004 Staffordshire v Lancashire

Career statistics
Competition	First-class	List A
Matches	100	109
Runs scored	5,354	2,307
Batting average	32.44	27.46
100s/50s	10/27	2/12
Top score	168	111*
Balls bowled	1,053	384
Wickets	14	11
Bowling average	46.28	33.45
5 wickets in innings	0	0
10 wickets in match	0	0
Best bowling	3/18	2/16
Catches/stumpings	127/–	41/–
- Source: CricketArchive, 18 October 2008

Graeme Francis Archer is a former English first-class cricketer. A middle order batsman, he played 100 first-class matches for Nottinghamshire from 1992 to 1999. He was awarded his Nottinghamshire cap in 1995. He later played Minor Counties Championship cricket for Staffordshire and Cheshire and club cricket in the Derbyshire Premier Cricket League.

He made a bright start to his career, averaging 47.5 in seven matches in his debut season in 1992, but found runs harder to come by in 1993. He established himself as a regular in 1994 and excelled in 1995, passing 1,000 runs for the first time in scoring 1,171 at 40.37. He built on this with 918 at 43.71 the following year, but despite having his best one day season in 1997, scoring 489 runs at 44.45 with two centuries, his performances fell away and after three years of averaging under thirty in the County Championship he was released. He scored ten first-class hundreds in all, with a best of 168 against Glamorgan, one of three centuries he recorded against the Welsh team.
