= 1996 Benson & Hedges Cup =

- Administrator: Test and County Cricket Board
- Cricket format: Limited overs cricket (50 overs per innings)
- Champions: Lancashire (4th title)
- Participants: 22
- Matches: 57
- Most runs: 425 Rob Bailey (Northamptonshire)
- Most wickets: 17 Mike Watkinson (Lancashire)

The 1996 Benson & Hedges Cup was the twenty-fifth edition of cricket's Benson & Hedges Cup. It was an English limited overs county cricket tournament which was held between 26 April and 13 July 1996.

The competition was won by Lancashire County Cricket Club for a record fourth time, defeating Northamptonshire County Cricket Club by 31 runs in the final at Lord's on 13 July 1996.

== Format ==
At the TCCB's winter meeting on 13 December 1995, it was agreed to reduce the format of the cup from 55 to 50 overs a side.

== Fixtures and results ==
=== Group stage ===
==== Group A ====
Team	Pld	W	L	NR	A	Pts	NRRA100
Lancashire	5	5	0	0	0	10	11.579
Warwickshire	5	3	1	1	0	7	39.578
Leicestershire	5	3	2	0	0	6	-3.928
Derbyshire	5	2	3	0	0	4	-4.790
Durham	5	1	3	1	0	3	-6.834
Minor Counties	5	0	5	0	0	0	-26.535

==== Group B ====
Team	Pld	W	L	NR	A	Pts	NRRA100
Northamptonshire	4	4	0	0	0	8	11.058
Yorkshire	4	3	1	0	0	6	15.255
Nottinghamshire	4	2	2	0	0	4	4.553
Worcestershire	4	1	3	0	0	2	2.284
Scotland	4	0	4	0	0	0	-36.257

==== Group C ====
Team	Pld	W	L	NR	A	Pts	NRRA100
Glamorgan	5	4	1	0	0	8	8.739
Kent	5	4	1	0	0	8	4.078
Essex	5	3	2	0	0	6	11.240
Somerset	5	3	2	0	0	6	4.764
Middlesex	5	1	4	0	0	2	-11.466
British Universities	5	0	5	0	0	0	-17.944

==== Group D ====
Team	Pld	W	L	NR	A	Pts	NRRA100
Surrey	4	4	0	0	0	8	18.977
Gloucestershire	4	3	1	0	0	6	17.850
Hampshire	4	2	2	0	0	4	12.750
Sussex	4	1	3	0	0	2	-1.286
Ireland	4	0	4	0	0	0	-49.884

=== Quarter-finals ===
28 May 1996
(scorecard)

Warwickshire; 239 all out (48.5 overs)	v	Glamorgan; 227 all out (48.3 overs)
Dominic Ostler 85; Gary Butcher 2/21 (6 overs)		Matthew Maynard 75; Gladstone Small 3/25 (9 overs)

Warwickshire won by 12 runs
Sophia Gardens, Cardiff
Umpires: Trevor Jesty & Allan Jones
Player of the match: Dominic Ostler (Warwickshire)

28, 29 May 1996
(scorecard)

Gloucestershire; 158 all out (46.5 overs)	v	Lancashire; 162/5 (39.4 overs)
Tony Wright 26; Steve Elworthy 4/14 (10 overs)		Neil Fairbrother 80*; Mike Smith 2/30 (9 overs)

Lancashire won by 5 wickets
Old Trafford, Manchester
Umpires: Barry Dudleston & Vanburn Holder
Player of the match: Neil Fairbrother (Lancashire)

- Reserve day used. Lancashire were 12/3 at the close of the first day's play.

28, 29 May 1996
(scorecard)

Northamptonshire; 293/7 (50 overs)	v	Kent; 270 all out (47.2 overs)
Rob Bailey 105*; Mark Ealham 2/38 (10 overs)		Trevor Ward 98; John Emburey 4/24 (5 overs)

Northamptonshire won by 23 runs
County Ground, Northampton
Umpires: Jack Bond & Graham Burgess
Player of the match: John Emburey (Northamptonshire)

- Reserve day used. Kent were 108/4 at the close of the first day's play.

28 May 1996
(scorecard)

Surrey; 229 all out (49.5 overs)	v	Yorkshire; 230/1 (37.1 overs)
Graham Thorpe 41; Chris Silverwood 3/41 (10 overs)		David Byas 116*; Joey Benjamin 1/53 (10 overs)

Yorkshire won by 9 wickets
The Foster's Oval, London
Umpires: Kevin Lyons & Peter Willey
Player of the match: David Byas (Yorkshire)

=== Semi-finals ===
11, 12 June 1996
(scorecard)

Yorkshire; 250/5 (50 overs)	v	Lancashire; 251/9 (50 overs)
Michael Bevan 95*; Mike Watkinson 2/30 (10 overs)		Warren Hegg 81; Darren Gough 2/39 (10 overs)

Lancashire won by 1 wicket
Old Trafford, Manchester
Umpires: David Constant & Ken Palmer
Player of the match: Warren Hegg (Lancashire)

- Reserve day used. Yorkshire were 198/5 at the end of the first day's play.

11, 12 June 1996
(scorecard)

Northamptonshire; 220/7 (50 overs)	v	Warwickshire; 193 all out (47.5 overs)
Tim Walton 70*; Paul Smith 2/56 (9 overs)		Paul Smith 45; Paul Taylor 2/25 (10 overs)

Northamptonshire won by 27 runs
County Ground, Northampton
Umpires: Chris Balderstone & John Hampshire
Player of the match: Tim Walton (Northamptonshire)

- Reserve day used. Warwickshire were 91/3 at the end of the first day's play.

=== Final ===
13 July 1996
(scorecard)

Lancashire; 245/9 (50 overs)	v	Northamptonshire; 214 all out (48.3 overs)
Neil Fairbrother 63; David Capel 2/37 (8 overs)		Rob Bailey 46; Ian Austin 4/21 (9.3 overs)

Lancashire won by 31 runs
Lord's, London
Umpires: Mervyn Kitchen & George Sharp
Player of the match: Ian Austin (Lancashire)

== See also ==
Benson & Hedges Cup
