= Simon Oakes (cricketer) =

English cricketer

Personal information
- Full name: Simon Oakes
- Born: 9 September 1974 (age 52); Grantham, Lincolnshire, England
- Batting: Right-handed
- Bowling: Right-arm fast-medium

Domestic team information
- Years: Team
- 1997–1998: Minor Counties
- 1996–2003: Lincolnshire

Career statistics
Competition	List A
Matches	14
Runs scored	39
Batting average	4.87
100s/50s	–/–
Top score	21
Balls bowled	714
Wickets	16
Bowling average	33.93
5 wickets in innings	–
10 wickets in match	–
Best bowling	3/37
Catches/stumpings	2/–
- Source: Cricinfo, 24 June 2011

Simon Oakes (born 9 September 1974) is a former English cricketer. Oakes was a right-handed batsman who bowled right-arm fast-medium. He was born in Grantham, Lincolnshire.

Oakes made his Minor counties debut for Lincolnshire in the 1996 MCCA Knockout Trophy against Bedfordshire. Oakes played Minor counties cricket for Lincolnshire from 1996 to 2002, which included 38 Minor Counties Championship matches and 23 MCCA Knockout Trophy matches. He made his List A debut against Gloucestershire in the 1996 NatWest Trophy, which was also Oakes' debut match for Lincolnshire. He made 11 further List A matches for Lincolnshire, the last coming against Norfolk. In his 12 matches for the county, he took 13 wickets at an average of 31.53, with best figures of 2/16. He also played 2 List A matches for the Minor Counties cricket team, against Yorkshire in the 1997 Benson & Hedges Cup and Leicestershire in the 1998 Benson & Hedges Cup. He 3 wickets for the Minor Counties, which came at an average of 44.33, with best figures of 3/37.
