= Suffolk County Cricket Club =

Minor Counties cricket club

Team information
- Founded: 1932
- Home ground: Various

History
- MCCC wins: 3 (+1 shared)
- MCCAT wins: 1
- Official website: Suffolk County Cricket Club

Suffolk County Cricket Club is one of twenty minor county clubs within the domestic cricket structure of England and Wales. It represents the historic county of Suffolk. The team is currently a member of the Minor Counties Championship Eastern Division, and plays in the MCCA Knockout Trophy. Suffolk played List A matches occasionally from 1966 until 2005, but is not classified as a List A team per se.

== History ==
The earliest-known reference to cricket in Suffolk is dated 1743. The first county match took place on the racecourse at Bury St Edmunds in August 1764, when Norfolk were the opponents, with three further matches played during the same year between the teams, one at Diss, and the other two at nearby Scole Common. Suffolk continued to play matches into the 19th century, including four against Marylebone Cricket Club (MCC) which are historically important—two in 1830 and two in 1847. (Note: Any match listed in the ACS' Important Match Guide (1981) is historically important, and therefore of the highest standard, whether or not a scorecard might exist. The same applies to numerous matches discovered by researchers since 1981. For further information, see First-class cricket.)

Suffolk's first county club was formed in July 1864, and in 1904 it joined the Minor Counties Championship, in which it competed until 1914. Following World War I, the club folded, mainly because the club secretary had been killed on active service, and the treasurer had left the county.

The modern county club was founded in August 1932, and joined the Minor Counties Championship in 1934. Suffolk won their first Minor Counties title in 1946. In 1966, the team played its first List A match, a Gillette Cup tie against Kent at Ipswich School. The team won two more Minor Counties titles, in 1977 and 1979, and shared it with Cheshire in 2005, after a rain-affected final could not be completed. Suffolk won their only limited overs title in 2007, when they defeated Cheshire in the MCCA Knockout Trophy final at Lord's.

== Honours ==
- Minor Counties Championship (3) – 1946, 1977, 1979; shared (1) – 2005
- MCCA Knockout Trophy (1) – 2007

== Grounds ==
Suffolk plays cricket at a variety of grounds across the county. In 2024, home matches were played at Wamil Way in Mildenhall, Old London Road at Copdock near Ipswich, the Victory Ground at Bury St Edmunds, at Ipswich School, and at Friar's Street in Sudbury.

The Victory Ground has been in use by the county since 1934, with Ipswich School first used for a county match the following year. Between 1904 and 1904, Suffolk played 101 Minor Counties Championship matches at the Town Ground in Felixstowe, the most it has played at any ground.

== Bibliography ==
- ACS (1981). A Guide to Important Cricket Matches Played in the British Isles 1709–1863. Nottingham: ACS. OCLC 85045528.
- Hounsome, Keir (2015). A Game Well Played: a History of Cricket in Norfolk. Norwich: Hounsome. ISBN 978-09-93229-60-2.
