= List of Cornwall County Cricket Club List A players =

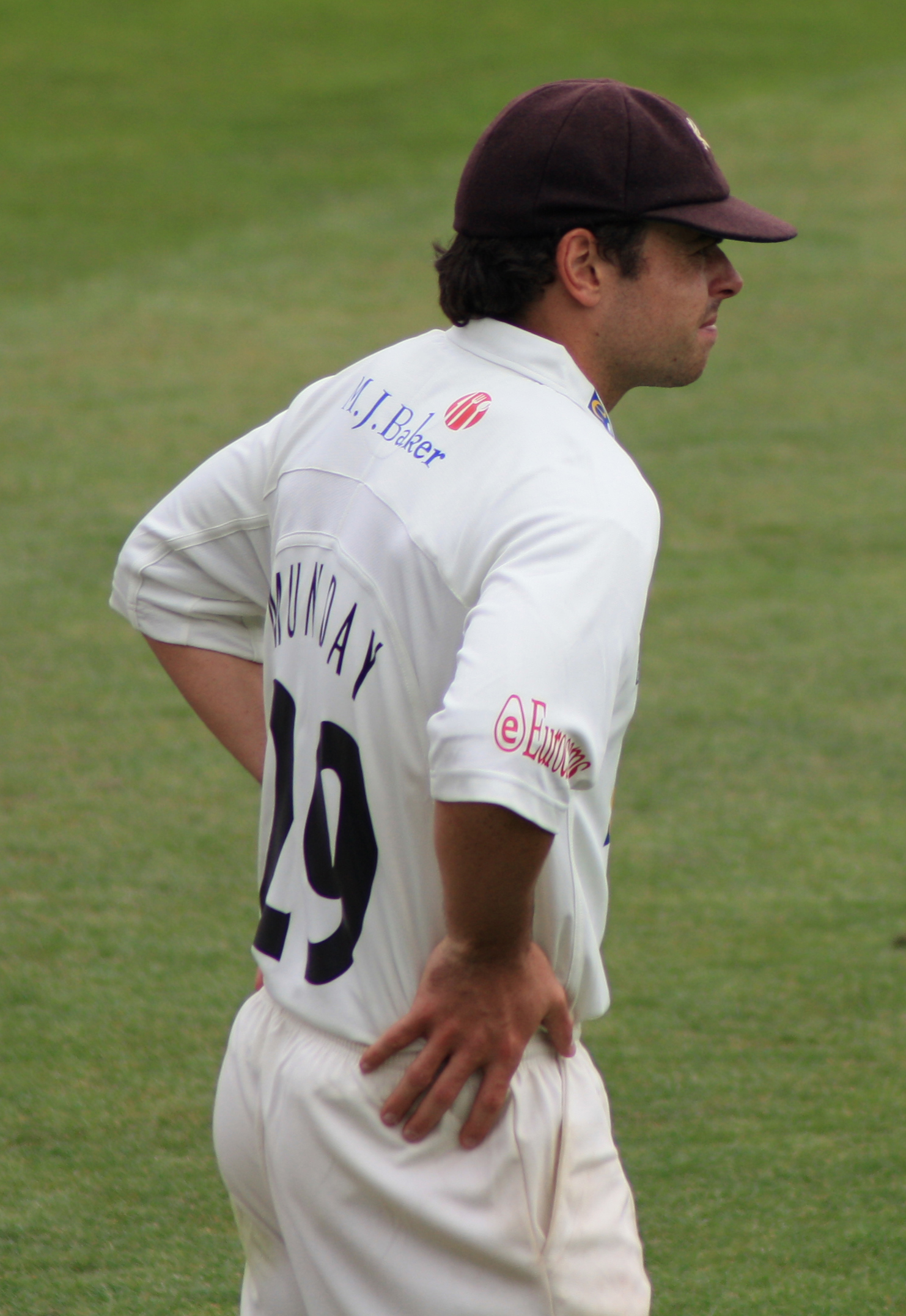
Michael Munday is one of fourteen Cornwall cricketers to have played first-class cricket.

Cornwall County Cricket Club was formed in 1894, and first competed in the Minor Counties Championship in 1904. Their first appearance in List A cricket was in 1970, and in total they have played seventeen matches, making four Gillette Cup, five NatWest Trophy and eight Cheltenham & Gloucester Trophy appearances. (Note: The Gillette Cup, NatWest Trophy and Cheltenham & Gloucester Trophy were all the same competition, under different sponsorship guises.) On three occasions the county progressed to the third round of the competition: in 2001, 2002, and 2003. Minor counties teams were excluded from the competition from the 2006 season; Cornwall's last match was against the Netherlands in the first round of the 2004 competition.

In their seventeen List A matches, 69 players have represented Cornwall. Gary Thomas has appeared the most times for the county, playing in twelve matches, closely followed by Jonathan Kent, who made eleven appearances. Kent recorded the highest score in List A cricket for Cornwall, scoring 80 runs against Somerset Cricket Board in 2002. Steven Pope, who played 109 first-class matches in his native South Africa is Cornwall's leading run-scorer, having scored 294 runs in his eight appearances for the county. Justin Stephens's thirteen wickets for the county is the most by any player, but Charlie Shreck has the best bowling figures, having taken five wickets against Worcestershire in 2002. Gavin Edwards, who appeared for Cornwall on seven occasions, has claimed the most dismissals as wicket-keeper, taking five catches and making two stumpings. Only three non-English players have appeared for Cornwall; Jersey's Ryan Driver, Pakistan's Naeem Akhtar and South Africa's Steven Pope.

The players in this list have all played at least one List A match. Cornwall cricketers who have not represented the county in List A cricket are not included in the list. Players are initially listed in order of appearance; where players made their debut in the same match, they are initially listed by batting order.

== Key ==
General

- ‡ – Captain
- † – Wicket-keeper
- ^{F} – Player has appeared in first-class cricket.
- First – Year of debut for Cornwall
- Last – Year of latest match played for Cornwall
- Mat – Number of matches played for Cornwall
- Win% – Winning percentage

Batting

- Inn – Number of innings batted
- NO – Number of innings not out
- Runs – Runs scored in career
- HS – Highest score
- 100 – Centuries scored
- 50 – Half-centuries scored
- Avg – Runs scored per dismissal
- * – Batsman remained not out

Bowling

- Balls – Balls bowled in career
- Wkt – Wickets taken in career
- BBI – Best bowling in an innings
- BBM – Best bowling in a match
- Ave – Average runs per wicket

Fielding

- Ca – Catches taken
- St – Stumpings effected

== List of players ==
No.	Name	Nationality	First	Last	Mat	Runs	HS	Avg	Balls	Wkt	BBI	Ave	Ca	St	Ref
No.	Name	Nationality	First	Last	Mat	Batting			Bowling				Fielding		Ref
1	Gerald Parsons ‡	England	1970	1970	1	6	6	6.00	0	0	–	–	1	0	
2	Eric Willcock ‡	England	1970	1986	5	79	43	15.80	0	0	–	–	5	0	
3	Christopher Chaplin	England	1970	1977	3	45	22	15.00	30	0	0/14	–	0	0	
4	Brian Laity ‡	England	1970	1977	3	81	66	27.00	0	0	–	–	0	0	
5	Malcolm Dunstan ^{F} ‡	England	1970	1986	5	73	28	14.60	0	0	–	–	1	0	
6	Keith Davis	England	1970	1970	1	4	4	4.00	72	2	2/30	15.00	0	0	
7	William Barnicoat	England	1970	1970	1	2	2	2.00	72	1	1/24	24.00	0	0	
8	Peter Kendall	England	1970	1975	2	10	10	5.00	126	1	1/42	83.00	0	0	
9	John Hurrell	England	1970	1970	1	10	10	10.00	72	1	1/30	30.00	0	0	
10	Brian Read	England	1970	1970	1	0	0	0.00	72	1	1/30	30.00	0	0	
11	William Lawry ^{F} †	England	1970	1980	3	1	1	1.00	0	0	–	–	2	0	
12	William Edwards	England	1975	1975	1	6	6	6.00	0	0	–	–	0	0	
13	Nigel Cock †	England	1975	1980	2	12	7	6.00	0	0	–	–	1	0	
14	David Halfyard ^{F}	England	1975	1977	2	14	14	7.00	144	3	3/30	22.33	1	0	
15	Michael Snowdon	England	1975	1975	1	4	4	4.00	51	0	0/30	–	0	0	
16	David Toseland	England	1975	2000	5	46	39	23.00	348	7	3/27	25.85	0	0	
17	Michael Trenwith	England	1975	1980	2	14	14*	14.00	144	5	3/51	14.40	0	0	
18	Michael Hands	England	1977	1977	1	5	5	5.00	0	0	–	–	1	0	
19	Alan Ashford	England	1977	1977	1	5	5	5.00	42	0	0/34	–	0	0	
20	Allan Lawrence	England	1977	1977	1	0	0	0.00	72	0	0/26	–	0	0	
21	Philip Johns	England	1977	1980	2	2	2	1.00	144	3	2/26	22.33	0	0	
22	Terry Willetts ^{F}	England	1980	1980	1	1	1	1.00	0	0	–	–	1	0	
23	Christopher Trudgeon	England	1980	1980	1	9	9	9.00	0	0	–	–	0	0	
24	Alex Machin	England	1980	1980	1	0	0	0.00	72	0	0/23	–	0	0	
25	Patrick Coombe	England	1980	1980	1	0	0	0.00	72	0	0/48	–	1	0	
26	Trevor Angove	England	1986	1986	1	13	13	13.00	0	0	–	–	0	0	
27	Philip Stephens	England	1986	1986	1	54	54	54.00	0	0	–	–	0	0	
28	Julian Cradick	England	1986	1986	1	10	10	10.00	0	0	–	–	0	0	
29	Andrew Snowdon	England	1986	1986	1	9	9	9.00	72	0	0/97	–	0	0	
30	Simon Hunt	England	1986	1986	1	2	2	2.00	72	0	0/87	–	0	0	
31	Godfrey Furse ‡	England	1986	1996	3	4	2	1.33	120	1	1/17	86.00	0	0	
32	Christopher Lovell	England	1986	1996	3	8	7	2.66	216	4	2/107	66.00	1	0	
33	Stephen Eva †	England	1986	1986	1	0	0*	–	0	0	–	–	0	0	
34	Steve Williams	England	1995	2000	4	151	52	37.75	0	0	–	–	1	0	
35	Gary Thomas ‡	England	1995	2003	12	115	44	9.58	48	0	0/1	–	3	0	
36	Adam Seymour ^{F}	England	1995	1995	1	0	0	0.00	72	0	0/35	–	2	0	
37	Edward Nicolson	England	1995	1995	1	38	38	38.00	0	0	–	–	0	0	
38	Timothy Walton	England	1995	1995	1	39	39	39.00	0	0	–	–	2	0	
39	Jonathan Kent	England	1995	2003	11	201	80	20.10	256	6	3/21	26.16	1	0	
40	Kevin Willcock	England	1995	1996	2	26	25	13.00	144	2	1/43	47.50	1	0	
41	Andrew Snell †	England	1995	1996	2	13	10*	–	0	0	–	–	2	0	
42	Paul Berryman	England	1995	2002	3	6	6	3.00	156	3	2/67	55.00	0	0	
43	Ryan Driver ^{F}	Jersey	1996	2003	3	38	19	12.66	90	1	1/96	96.00	0	0	
44	Paul Lello	England	1996	2000	3	37	20	12.33	48	1	1/43	55.00	2	0	
45	James Hands	England	1996	2003	8	187	61	23.37	378	10	3/25	24.50	4	0	
46	David Angove	England	1996	1996	1	6	6	6.00	72	4	4/65	16.25	0	0	
47	Tom Sharp ‡	England	1999	2003	9	263	61	29.22	84	2	2/33	35.50	2	0	
48	Naeem Akhtar ^{F}	Pakistan	1999	1999	1	7	7	7.00	60	1	1/51	51.00	0	0	
49	Barry Purchase	England	1999	1999	1	38	38	38.00	0	0	–	–	1	0	
50	Carl Gazzard ^{F} †	England	1999	1999	1	16	16	16.00	0	0	–	–	2	0	
51	Chris Ellison	England	1999	1999	1	5	5	5.00	60	3	3/64	21.33	1	0	
52	Justin Stephens	England	1999	2003	9	97	31*	32.33	507	13	3/54	25.00	3	0	
53	Charlie Shreck ^{F}	England	1999	2002	7	11	9	5.50	360	12	5/19	24.83	2	0	
54	Steven Pope ^{F}	South Africa	2000	2003	8	294	74	36.75	402	9	2/16	28.11	2	0	
55	Mark George	England	2000	2000	1	4	4	4.00	0	0	–	–	0	0	
56	Neil Williams ^{F}	England	2000	2000	1	8	8*	–	53	0	0/37	–	0	0	
57	Gavin Edwards †	England	2000	2003	7	134	31*	44.66	0	0	–	–	5	2	
58	Benjamin Price	England	2001	2003	7	184	74	26.28	0	0	–	–	2	0	
59	Neil Curnow	England	2001	2002	3	37	25	12.33	0	0	–	–	1	0	
60	Tim Edwards ^{F} †	England	2001	2001	2	67	53*	67.00	0	0	–	–	3	0	
61	Nicholas George	England	2001	2001	2	0	0	0.00	30	1	1/49	49.00	0	0	
62	Michael Munday ^{F}	England	2001	2001	1	0	–	–	30	1	1/39	39.00	0	0	
63	Chris Hunkin	England	2001	2003	4	58	30	19.33	222	5	2/24	37.80	1	0	
64	Stephen Pollard	England	2001	2001	1	0	0	0.00	0	0	–	–	0	0	
65	Roger Burley †	England	2001	2001	1	0	0*	–	0	0	–	–	2	1	
66	Martin Pearce	England	2002	2003	4	57	28	14.25	0	0	–	–	0	0	
67	Martin Jenkin	England	2002	2002	1	6	6	6.00	42	2	2/44	22.00	1	0	
68	Nicholas Carter	England	2002	2002	2	10	10*	–	104	3	2/21	22.00	0	0	
69	David Roberts ^{F}	England	2003	2003	1	0	0	0.00	0	0	–	–	1	0	

== List A captains ==
No.	Name	First	Last	Mat	Won	Lost	Tied	Win%
1	Gerald Parsons	1970	1970	1	0	1	0	0%
2	Brian Laity	1975	1977	2	0	2	0	0%
3	Malcolm Dunstan	1980	1980	1	0	1	0	0%
4	Eric Willcock	1986	1986	1	0	1	0	0%
5	Godfrey Furse	1995	1996	2	0	2	0	0%
6	Gary Thomas	1999	2001	5	2	3	0	40.00%
7	Tom Sharp	2002	2003	5	2	3	0	40.00%
Total		1970	2003	17	4	13	0	23.53%

== See also ==
- Sport in Cornwall

== Notes and references ==
Notes
