= List of Cornish sportsmen and sportswomen =

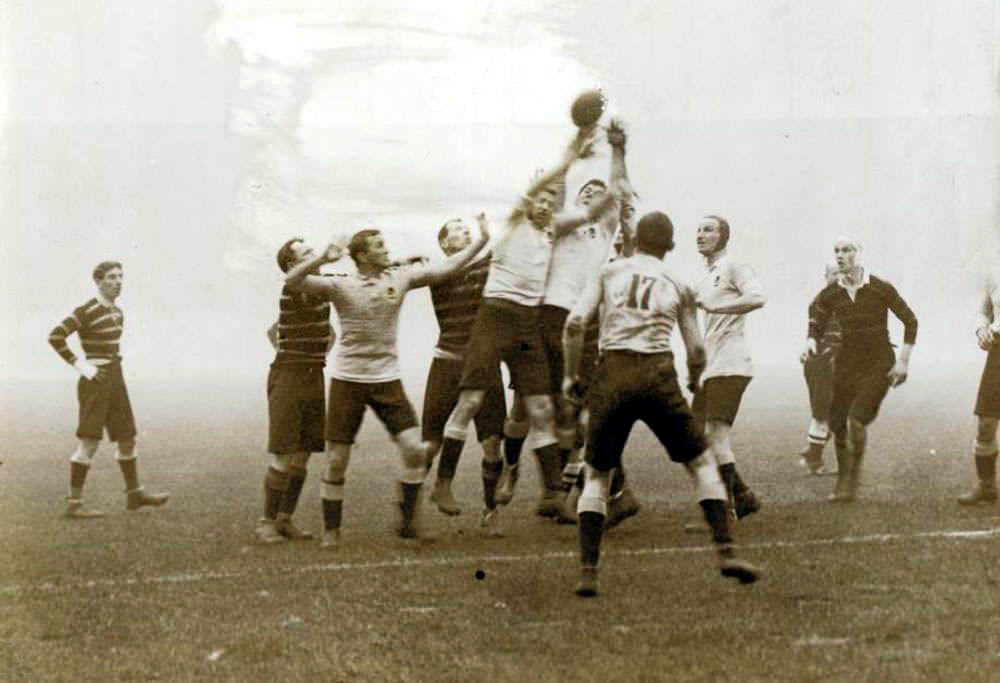
1908 Olympic Gold rugby union final, Australia versus Cornwall

This is a list of Cornish sportsmen and sportswomen.

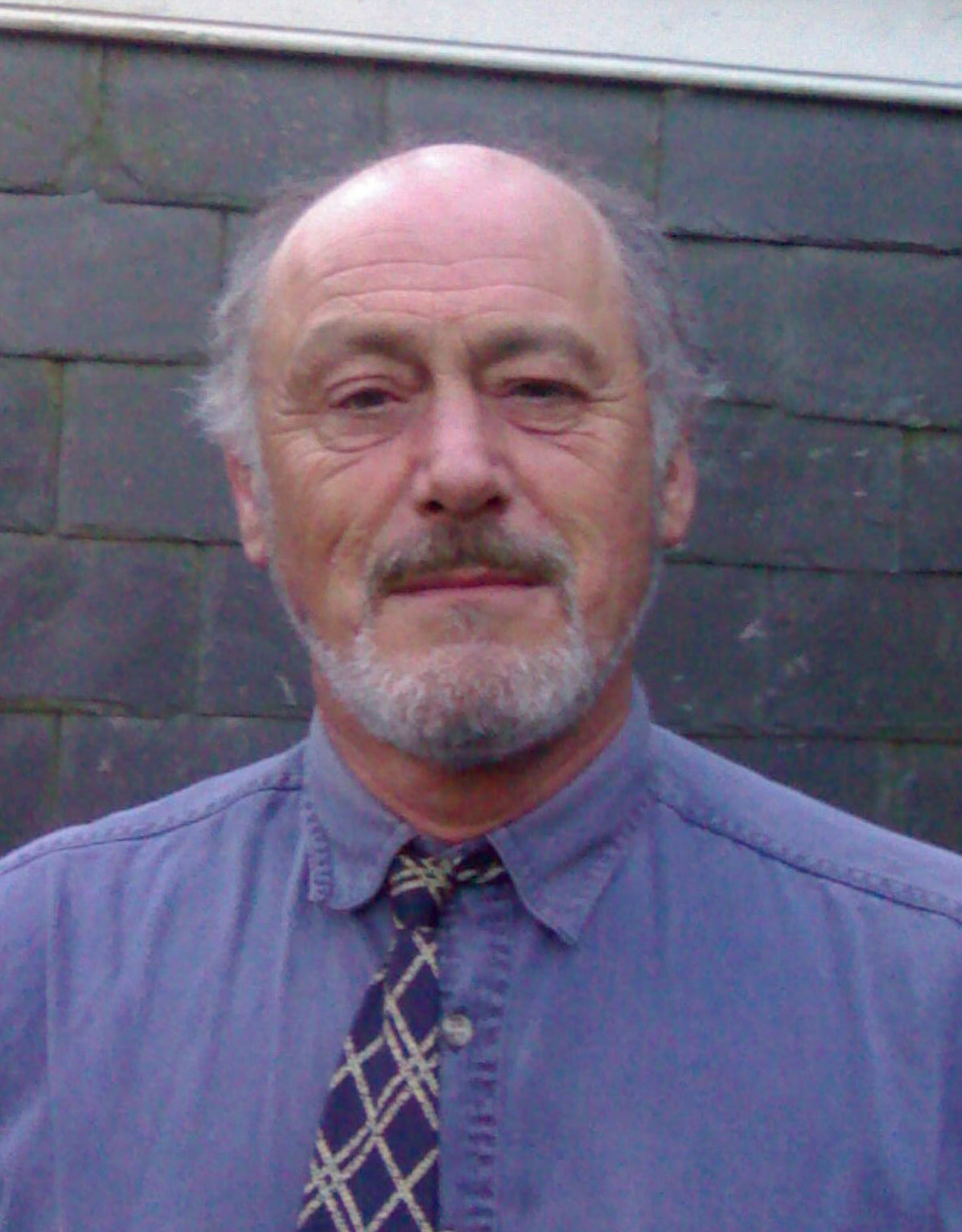
Craig Weatherhill

== Football ==
- Ray Bowden (1909-1998), England international, former Plymouth Argyle, Arsenal and Newcastle United player
- Harry Cann (1905-1980), former Plymouth Argyle player
- Ollie Chenoweth, retired professional football goalkeeper
- Jack Cock (1893-1966), England international, former Chelsea, Everton and Plymouth Argyle player, first Cornishman to play for England
- Alfred C. Crowle (1899-1979), manager of Mexico national football team
- Matthew Etherington (born 1981), England U21 international, former Tottenham Hotspur, West Ham United and Stoke City player (played in two FA Cup finals with two different teams: West Ham United and Stoke City)
- Johnny Hore (born 1947), former Plymouth Argyle player and manager
- Tony Kellow (1952-2011), former Exeter City and Blackpool player, Vice-Chairman of the Cornwall Commonwealth Games Association (now defunct)
- Nigel Martyn (born 1966), England international, former Crystal Palace, Leeds United and Everton player
- Kevin Miller (born 1969), former Exeter City, Birmingham City, Watford and Crystal Palace player
- Chris Morris (born 1963), Ireland international, former Sheffield Wednesday, Celtic and Middlesbrough player
- Wayne Quinn (born 1976), former Sheffield United, Newcastle United and West Ham United player
- Charles Reep (1904-2002), inventor of the long ball
- Katie Robinson (born 2002), footballer for England
- John Rogers (1893-1965), played for Crystal Palace, 17th Middx Reg (Footballers Battalion 1914-19), Aberdare; Sunderland and Norwich City.
- Jack Stephens (born 1994), England U21 international, Southampton player
- Mike Tiddy (1929-2009), former Cardiff City, Arsenal and Brighton & Hove Albion player
- Anthony Tonkin (born 1980), former Yeovil Town, Crewe Alexandra, Oxford United and Cambridge United player
- Mike Trebilcock (born 1944), former Plymouth Argyle, Everton and Portsmouth player, FA Cup winner with Everton in 1966
- Craig Weatherhill, historian, Cornish bard, goalkeeper for Cornwall

== Cricket ==
- Arthur Agar-Robartes, army officer and cricketer
- Julian Cradick, Cornwall cricketer
- Jack Crapp, England cricketer
- Neil Edwards, First Class cricketer with Somerset CCC
- Godfrey Furse
- Carl Gazzard, First Class cricketer with Somerset CCC
- Laura Harper, England international cricketer
- Pasty Harris, First Class cricketer
- Michael Munday (1995–2002), cricketer for Somerset CCC
- Tony Penberthy, former First Class cricketer with Northamptonshire CCC
- Jack Richards, England cricketer
- Charlie Shreck (1991–1996), cricketer for Nottinghamshire CCC
- Gary Thomas
- Marcus Trescothick, England cricketer of Cornish lineage
- Eric Willcock, English cricketer

See also Cornwall County Cricket Club List A players.

== Rugby Union ==
- Paul Andrew, rugby union player
- Olly Barkley, international and Premiership rugby player with Bath Rugby
- Luke Cowan-Dickie, international and Premiership rugby player with Exeter Chiefs
- Ben Gollings, rugby player, of England Sevens, and Rugby Lions
- Francis Gregory, Cornish wrestler, boxer, rugby union footballer and rugby league footballer
- Roger Hosen, international rugby player
- John Kendall-Carpenter, England international rugby union captain
- Josh Matavesi, Cornish-Fijian rugby player
- Sam Matavesi, Cornish-Fijian rugby player
- Richard Nancekivell, rugby player
- Jack Nowell (born 1993), international and Premiership rugby player with Exeter Chiefs
- Andy Reed, international rugby player who played for Bath RFC and won 18 caps for Scotland
- Vic Roberts, international rugby player
- Geoffrey Rowe, rugby player and comedian
- Richard Sharp, international rugby player of the 1960s who captained England and won 14 caps
- Barney Solomon, rugby union player who captained the silver medal winning Great Britain team in the 1908 Olympics
- Stack Stevens, international rugby and British Lions player who won 25 caps for England
- Rob Thirlby (1989–1992), England international rugby sevens player
- Jay Tyack, rugby union player for Bristol Bears in the Premiership Rugby
- Phil Vickery, international rugby player and World Cup winner
- Tom Voyce, international and Premiership rugby player with London Wasps
- Hugh Vyvyan, international and Premiership rugby player
- Trevor Woodman, international rugby player and World Cup winner

See also Team members of the Cornwall team in the Summer Olympics, London, 1908.

== Combat sports ==
- Jack Carkeek, Cornish American wrestler
- Gerry Cawley, champion Cornish wrestler
- Bob Fitzsimmons, boxer and first Heavyweight, Light-Heavyweight and Middleweight World Champion
- Francis Gregory, Cornish wrestler, boxer, rugby union footballer and rugby league footballer
- Philip Hancock of St Austell was the World Cornish Wrestling champion in 1884, winning the "open to the world" belt in Penzance. He was known as "Phep" or "Phip" and came from Mullion, Cornwall. He was 5ft 9in and won the champion belt of Devon and Cornwall, wrestling in front of the Prince of Wales. He claimed that he was never thrown or beaten in 28 years in competitions across the UK.
- Len Harvey, boxer
- Richard Parkyn, champion Cornish wrestler
- Brad Pauls, (born 1993), boxer
- James Polkinghorne, champion Cornish wrestler
- Sweet Saraya (born 1971), pro wrestler
- See the following link for Notable Cornish wrestlers by country.

== Watersports ==
- Ben Ainslie (born 1977), sailor, 4-time Olympic gold medallist
- Ed Coode (born 1975), rower, Olympic gold medalist
- Ann Glanville (1796-1880), 19th-century champion rower
- Helen Glover (born 1986), rower, 2-time Olympic gold medallist
- Pete Goss (born 1961), sailor
- Finn Hawkins (born 2002), windsurfer
- Robert Peverell Hichens, (1909-1943), rower and motor-racing driver
- Cassie Patten (born 1987), swimmer, Olympic bronze medallist
- Hannah Stacey, free-diver
- Annabel Vernon (born 1982), rower, Olympic silver medallist

== Others ==
- Michael Adams (born 1971), chess grandmaster
- Richard Ashton, (born 1955), athletics, 400 metres
- Jonah Barrington (born 1941), squash player
- Jonathan Barron (born 1937), snooker player
- Michaela Breeze (born 1979), weightlifter
- Norman Croucher (born 1941), double amputee mountain climber
- John George (born 1961), motor-racing driver
- Paul Gosling (born 1949), darts player
- James Honeybone (born 1991), fencer
- Loveday King (born 1935), darts player
- Brian Netherton (1942-2011), darts player
- Nick Nieland (born 1972), athlete, javelin thrower
- Robert Peverell Hichens, (1909-1943), rower and motor-racing driver
- Jemma Simpson (born 1984), athlete, 800m runner
- Talan Skeels-Piggins (born 1970), Paralympic alpine skier
- Peter Tregloan (born 1957), strongman and powerlifter
- Owen Truelove (1937-2006), record-holding glider pilot
- Venetia Williams (born 1960), racehorse trainer and former jockey

== See also ==
- Category:Sportspeople from Cornwall
