= Sport in Cornwall =

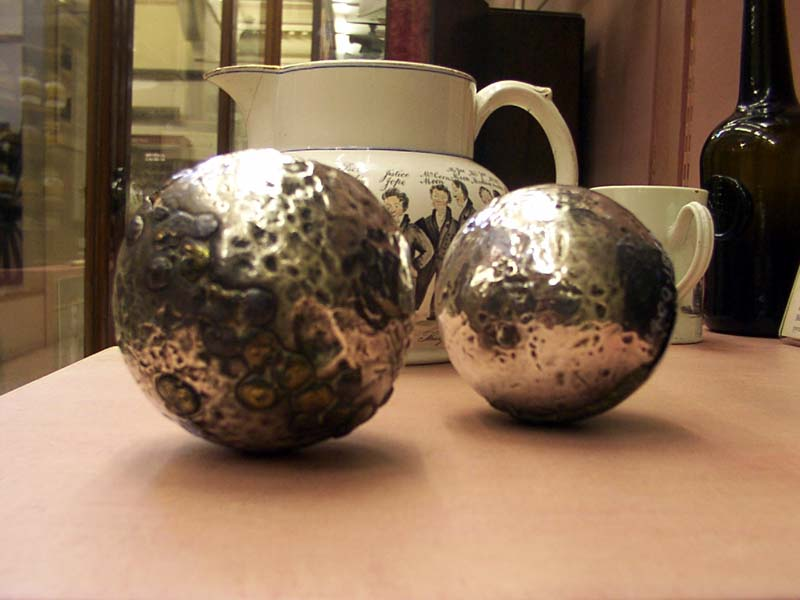
Hurling balls

Sport in Cornwall includes two sports not found elsewhere in the world, except in areas influenced by Cornish culture i.e. the Cornish forms of wrestling and hurling. The sports otherwise most closely associated with Cornwall are rugby union football and surfing.

Rugby omission. J M Williams was capped twice for England rugby in 1951. He played for Penzance.

== Planning and politics ==
Infrastructure and facilities

Currently the major hurdle for Cornish sports is the lack of infrastructure and facilities compared to other areas of the UK. There is no stadium suitable for professional sport, although facilities have started to develop.

Commonwealth Games

In 2005 campaigners formed the Cornwall Commonwealth Games Association claiming that Cornwall should be recognised with a place in the 2006 Commonwealth Games citing the fact that Jersey, Guernsey and the Isle of Man are allowed to compete separately. However, according to a BBC News report, the application was refused by the Commonwealth Games Federation whose chief executive said that Cornwall is no more than an English county and had no chance. The campaign lapsed, was restarted, then lapsed again in 2010. It has not been revived.

== Combat sports ==
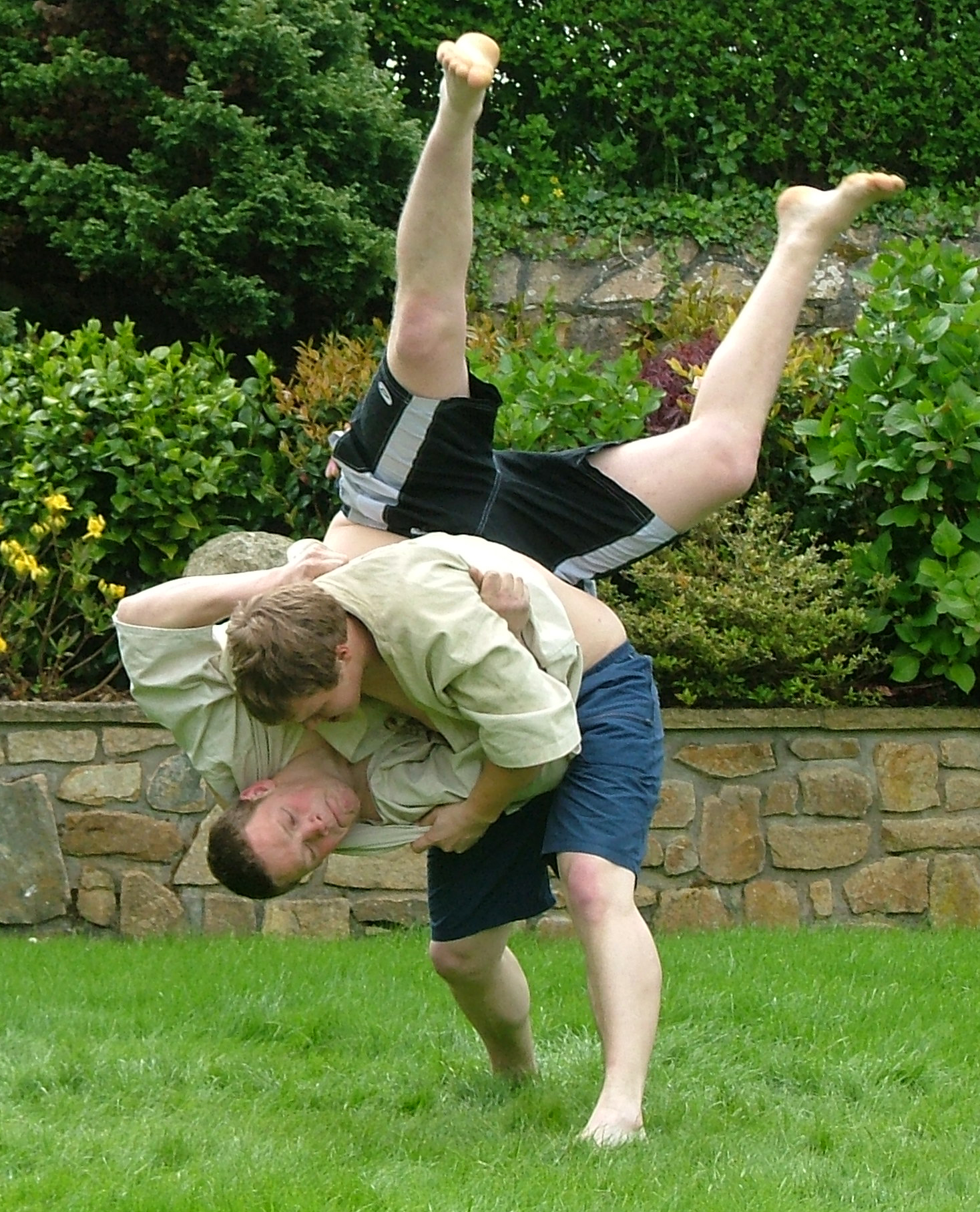
John Cawley throwing Chris French at Robby Richards Museum Opening, May 2006

Cornwall has its own unique form of wrestling related to Breton wrestling. This has encouraged tournaments between the two nations. Cornish wrestling (also known as Wrasslin') is a regional, folk style of grappling or martial arts. Cornish wrestling spread through the UK, with London tournaments offering huge prizes from the late Middle Ages. The sport then spread through the world with regular competitions and titles being held in the US, Australia, New Zealand and South Africa. There are even records of a tournament in Japan in 1872. The Cornwall County Wrestling Association was formed in 1923, to standardise the rules of the sport and to promote Cornish wrestling throughout Cornwall and the world. Together with Cornish hurling (a localised form of medieval football), Wrasslin' has been promoted as a distinctly Celtic game, tied closely with Cornish identity.

Helston-born boxer Bob Fitzsimmons (26 May 1863 – 22 October 1917), who moved to New Zealand as a child, was the first ever boxer to become Heavyweight, Light-Heavyweight and Middleweight World Champion. Len Harvey was another notable boxer from Cornwall.

As its population is comparatively small, and largely rural, Cornwall's contribution to British national sport in the United Kingdom has been limited; the county's greatest successes have come in fencing. In 2014, half of the men's GB team fenced for Truro Fencing Club, and 3 Truro fencers appeared at the 2012 Olympics.

== Hurling ==
Cornwall's other national sport is hurling, a kind of medieval football played with a silver ball. Hurling is distinct from Irish Hurling. The sport now takes place in St Columb Major, St Ives and Bodmin only.

== Shinty ==
Cornwall is one of the few places outside of Scotland to play the ancient sport of Shinty, which has similar roots to Hurling, but is played more on the ground. There is a 6-a-side league that runs in Cornwall (and now Devon) with the larger Cornwall Shinty Club competing in competitions in both England and Scotland. Within Cornwall Shinty is mainly concentrated in Falmouth and Penryn, the latter being the English Shinty Association base, in association with the combined Universities, who field teams competitively as well.

== Rugby football ==
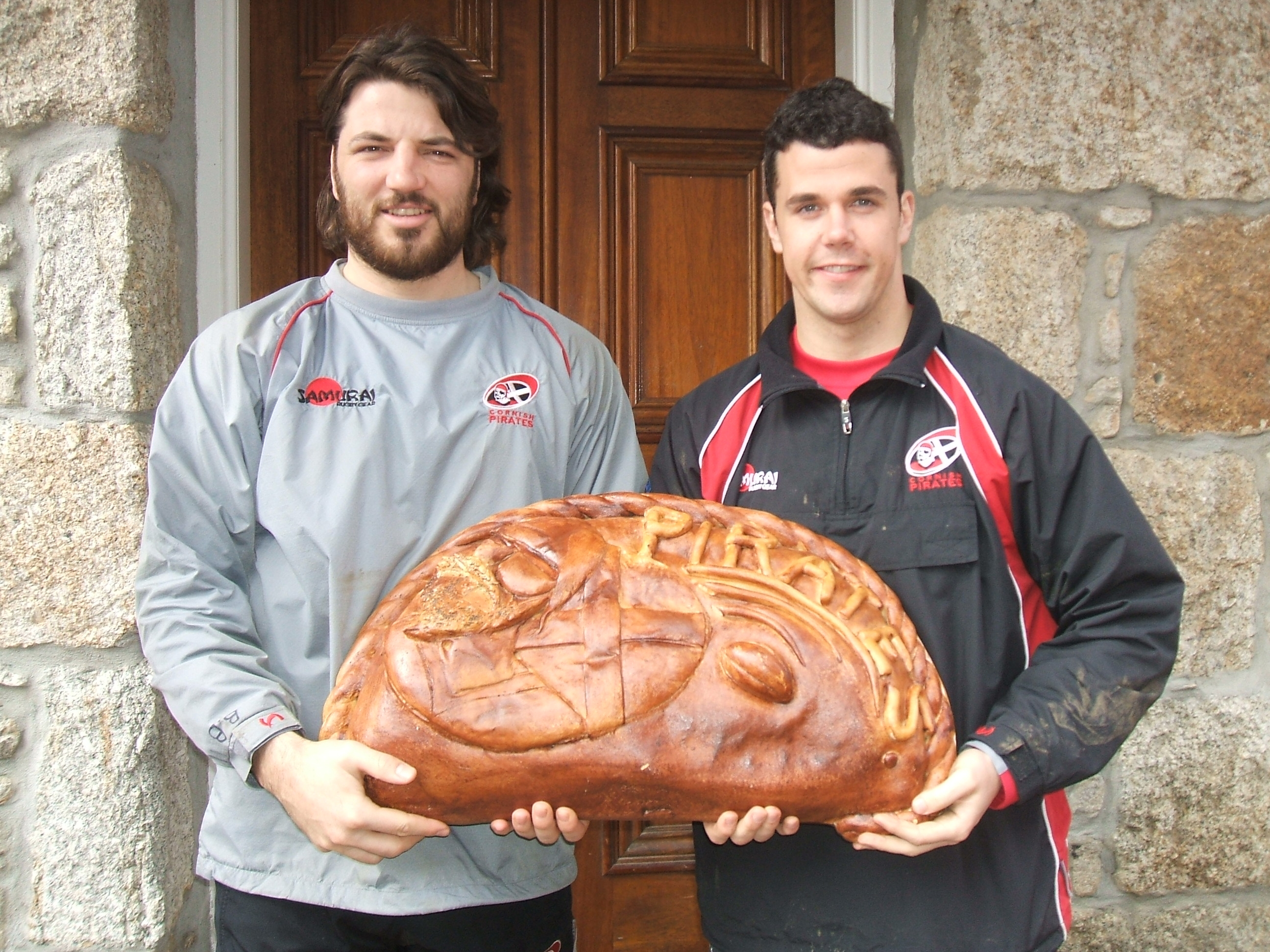
Cornish Pirates (senior XV of Penzance & Newlyn RFC) players display a giant pasty which was paraded as part of the 2009 St. Piran's Festival at Camborne, Cornwall

Rugby union has a large following in Cornwall. The followers of the county side are dubbed Trelawny's Army. In 1999 Cornwall made the County Championships finals, played at Twickenham Stadium, with Cornwall beating Gloucestershire to win the cup.

Cornish rugby has produced many fine rugby players who have played at international level. Such players as Phil Vickery and Trevor Woodman won 2003 Rugby World Cup winners medals with England, Stack Stevens (England and British & Irish Lions), Graham Dawe (England), along with Andy Reed who has represented Scotland and the Lions, and many others.

Also, the Cornish rugby team can boast an Olympic silver medal. In 1908, they won the County Championship for the first time, and the prize was to represent Great Britain at rugby in the 1908 Olympic Games. They lost to Australia 32–3 in the final, and to this day remain the only county side to represent Great Britain at rugby in the Olympics (See Rugby union at the 1908 Summer Olympics for more details and the teams).

In rugby league, amateur club Cornish Rebels were initially the only team in the county. In 2021, this changed when semi-professional club Cornwall R.L.F.C. joined the third tier of the professional league system, RFL League 1.

== Association football ==
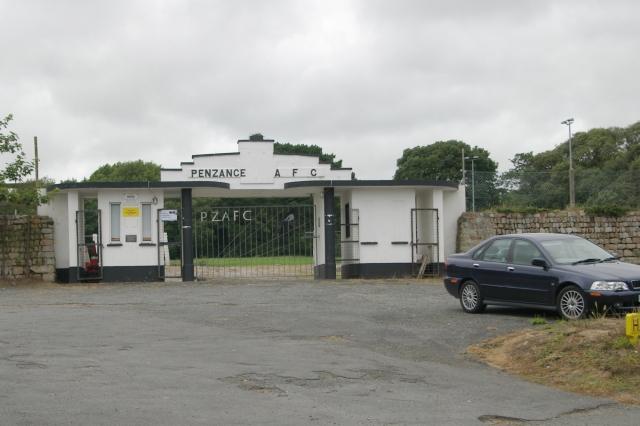
Entrance to the ground of Penzance A.F.C.

Association football and cricket are played in most villages and towns. While rugby is widely held to be the most popular sport in Cornwall, association football has increased in popularity. Truro City have the largest following. They play in the 2025–26 National League, the 5th tier of the English football pyramid, following promotion from National League South.

Truro City became the first ever Cornish football club to win a national competition when in 2007 they won the FA Vase, defeating AFC Totton 3–1 in the final. Following historic promotion in 2025, Truro City also became the first ever professional club in the county, before that most of Cornwall's football fans followed Plymouth Argyle who are in Devon.

The Cornish Football Association was founded in 1889. John Gilbert "Jack" Cock DCM MM (14 November 1893 – 19 April 1966) was a Cornish footballer who played for various English club sides as a striker. He also had the distinction of being the first Cornishman to play, and score, for the England national team. He was a decorated World War I soldier, and an actor. Chris Morris represented the Republic of Ireland at the 1990 World Cup & the 1988 European Championships. In 1901 Cornish miners founded the first football team in Mexico, Club de Futbol Pachuca. Originally, they practised only as a pastime during their free time they had while working at the mines. From 1917 to 1920, Pachuca was champion of the league under Cornish born coach Alfred C. Crowle. In 1966, Cornishman Mike Trebilcock scored two goals for Everton in the FA Cup final at Wembley.

== Cricket ==
One of the earliest references to cricket in Cornwall is 1816 and Sir William Pratt Call of Whiteford House in Stoke Climsland, organised a match against the Plymouth Garrison, and noted:- tea and a meal in a marquee at 6 o'clock. Cornwall County Cricket Club competed in the Minor Counties Championship, the second tier National County structure; and more recently in the National Counties of English and Welsh cricket championship. There is also a Cornwall Cricket League.

Notable Cornish cricketers include the following:

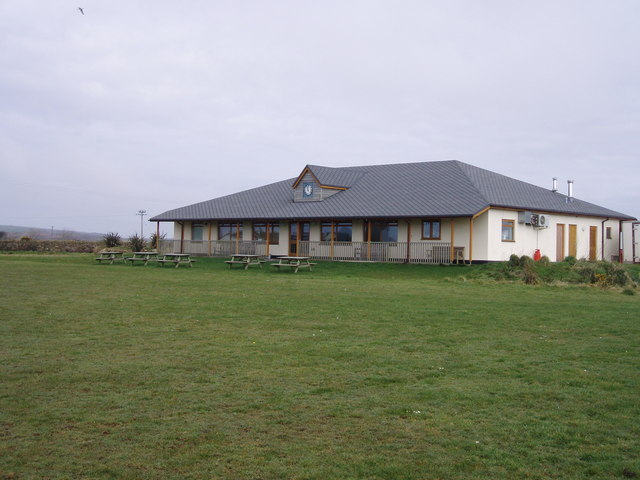
St Buryan Cricket Club pavilion

- Jack Crapp, England cricketer
- Malcolm Dunstan, former First Class cricketer with Gloucestershire CCC (began at Troon Cricket Club)
- Neil Edwards, First Class cricketer with Somerset CCC
- Carl Gazzard, First Class cricketer with Somerset CCC
- Pasty Harris, First Class cricketer
- Michael Munday, First Class cricketer with Somerset CCC
- Anthony Penberthy, former First Class cricketer with Northamptonshire CCC
- Jack Richards, England cricketer
- Charlie Shreck, First Class cricketer with Nottinghamshire CCC
- Marcus Trescothick, England cricketer of Cornish lineage.

== Water sports and climbing ==
Surfers at Pentreath Beach

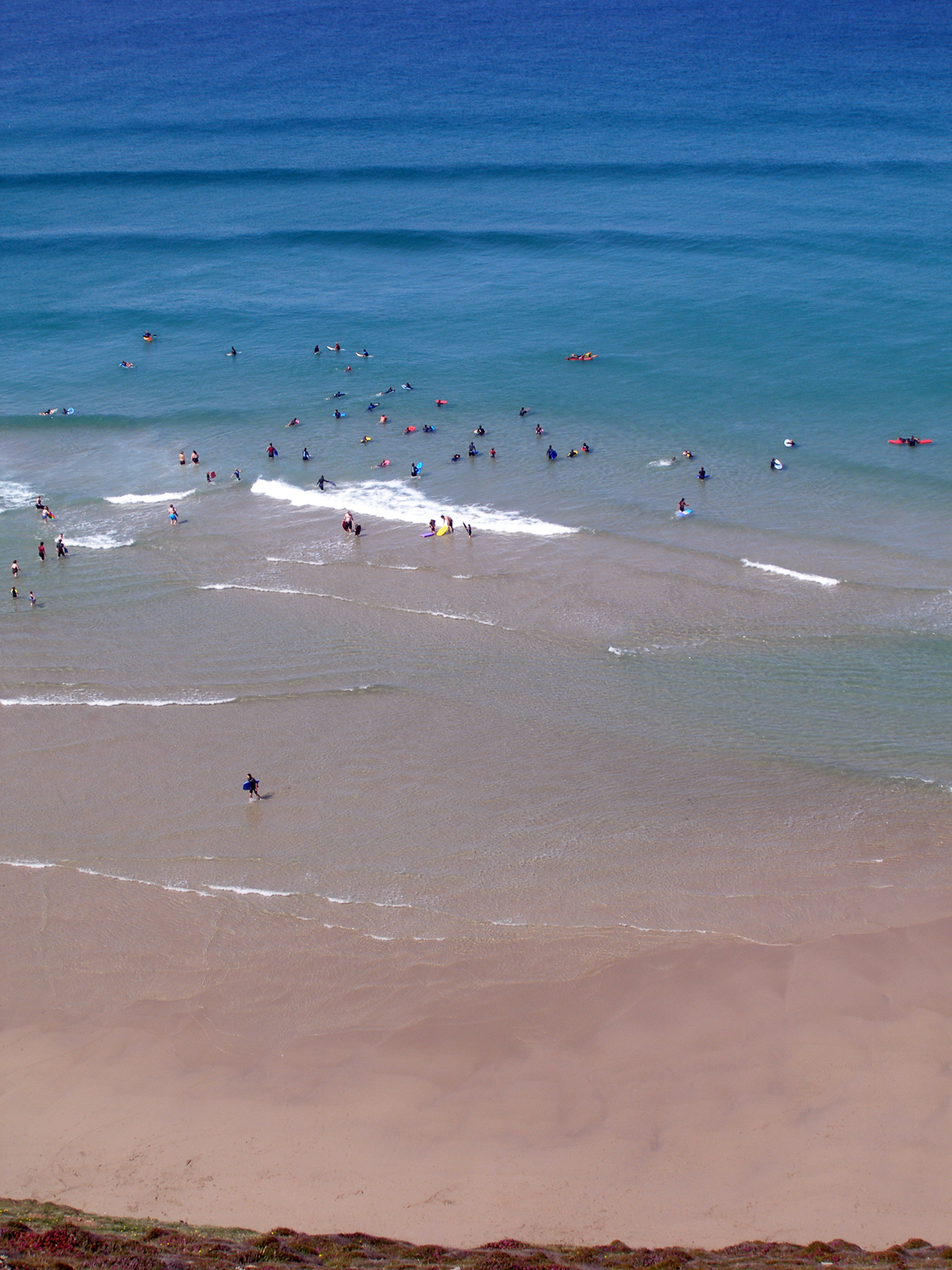
Surfers in Cornwall

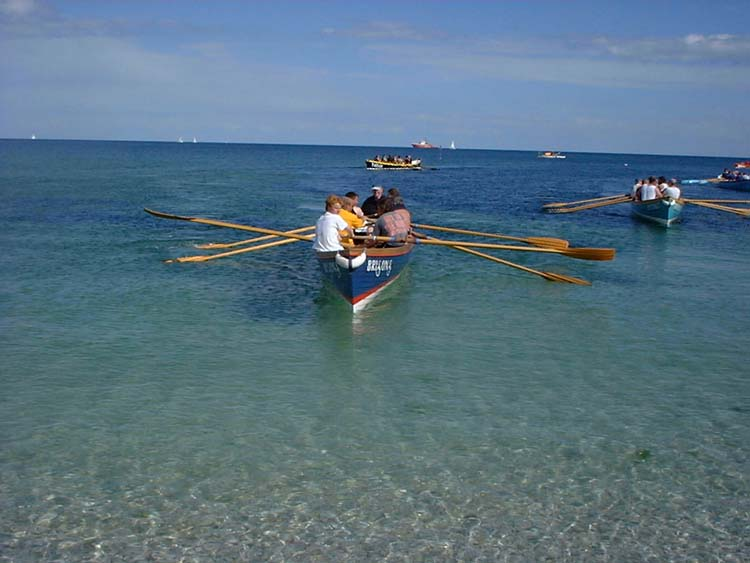
A pilot gig returning from a race at Falmouth

Due to its long coastline, various maritime sports are popular in Cornwall, notably sailing, surfing and gig rowing. International events are frequently held in Cornwall. International events in both are held in Cornwall. Cornwall hosted the Inter-Celtic Watersports Festival in 2006.

Surfing was popularised in Cornwall during the late 20th century, and has since become readily associated with Cornishness. The waves around the Cornish coastline are created by low pressure systems from the Atlantic Ocean which unleash powerful swells eastwards creating multiple, excellent surfing conditions around Cornwall. Newquay, one of Britain's "premier surfing towns", regularly hosts world championship surfing events. Surfing in particular is very popular, as locations such as Bude and Newquay offer some of the best surf in the UK. On 2 September 2007, 300 surfers arrived at Polzeath beach, Cornwall to set a new world record for the highest number of surfers riding the same wave (as part of the Global Surf Challenge and part of a project called Earthwave to raise awareness about global warming).

Pilot gig rowing has been popular for many years. The Isles of Scilly hosts the World Pilot Gig Championships every year. There are sailing clubs at some of the ports, e.g. Fowey. The Royal Fowey Yacht Club is located in a waterfront setting at Fowey: was founded in 1880. Its third Honorary Secretary, from 1893, was Arthur Quiller-Couch, who became Sir Arthur. The Lerryn Regatta was a popular annual event and at one time it was called The Henley of the West. It was mentioned in the Royal Cornwall Gazette of 1870. There was a break for the first World War and the regatta restarted with a Peace Regatta in 1919. There was a second break for the second World War and the regatta restarted in 1953 and ran until 1968 when four thousand people attended.

Rock climbing

Rock climbing on the sea cliffs and inland cliffs has been popular since the pioneering work of A. W. Andrews and others in the early 1900s, and is now highly developed.

== Motor sport ==
Davidstow Circuit was established in 1952 on the former military airfield and later modified. The track was 4.2 km (2.6 mi) long and used the main runways of RAF Davidstow Moor. Three Formula 1 races were held here between 1954 and 1955. The circuit hosted its last race in 1955.

From 2001 until 2003, the only fully professional sports team in Cornwall were the Trelawny Tigers speedway team, who raced at the Clay Country Moto Parc in the clay pits near St Austell. The team took over from the St Austell Gulls who were an amateur speedway team which operated from 1997 to 2000. The Gulls also operated at Par Moor in the 1950s. During the Trelawny Tigers years, a local young speedway rider emerged called Chris Harris. He has twice won the local BBC television sports personality of the year, and was British champion in 2007. Chris, nicknamed 'Bomber', came through the ranks of Grasstrack racing, another popular sport in Cornwall. He currently competes in the Speedway Grand Prix, the elite speedway tournament.

== Cycling ==
The One and All Cycling Club of Penzance was formed on 5 March 1881, and two years later had twenty-six members. Other Cornish cycling clubs in the 1880s included Camborne Bicycle Club, Helston Cycling Club, The Lanhydrock Wheelers, Falmouth Bicycle Club and Truro Cycling Club

== See also ==
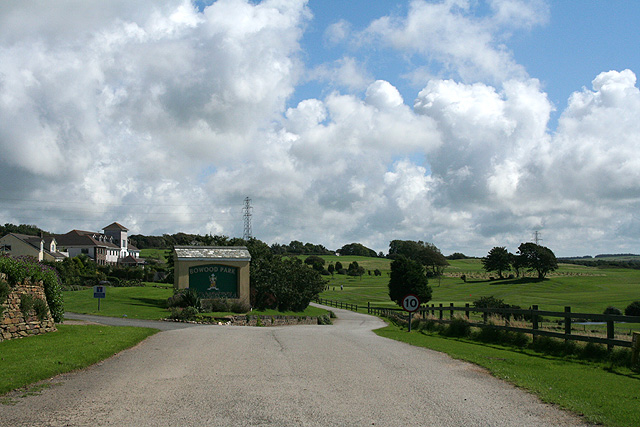
Bowood Park course, Camelford

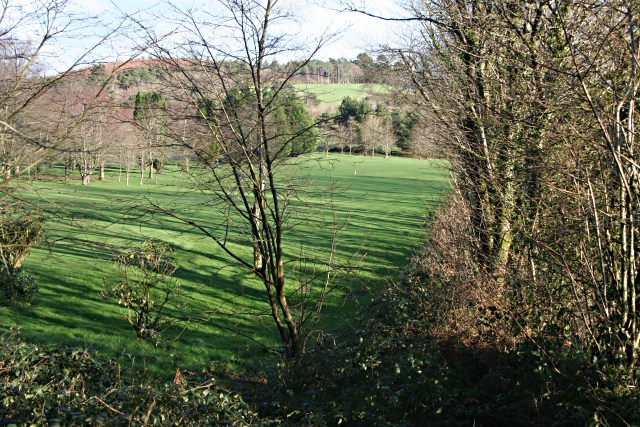
Launceston Golf Course

- Category:Cornish sports and games
- List of Cornish sportsmen and sportswomen
- List of King George V Playing Fields
- List of golf courses in Cornwall
- Cornwall Shinty Club
