= Gavin Edwards =

Gavin Edwards may refer to:

- Gavin Edwards (cricketer) (born 1979), English cricketer
- Gavin Edwards (writer), American writer
- Gavin Edwards (basketball) (born 1988), American basketball player
- Gavin Edwards (politician), South African politician
