= Al Lawrence =

Al Lawrence may refer to:

- Al Lawrence (chess writer), American chess expert and author
- Al Lawrence (sprinter) (born 1961), Jamaican former athlete
- Al Lawrence (runner) (1930–2017), Australian Olympic medallist
- Al Lawrence (long jumper) (born 1925), American long jumper and decathlete, 1946, 1947, and 1949 All-American for the USC Trojans track and field team
- T. E. Lawrence (1888–1935), British wartime officer in WWI known to Arabs as Al-Lawrence

== See also ==
- Allan Lawrence (disambiguation)
- Albert Lawrence (disambiguation)
- Alfred Lawrence (disambiguation)
