= Martin Pearce =

English cricketer

Personal information
- Full name: Arthur Martin Pearce
- Born: 14 December 1983 (age 42); Truro, Cornwall, England
- Batting: Right-handed

Domestic team information
- Years: Team
- 2001–2008: Cornwall

Career statistics
Competition	LA
Matches	4
Runs scored	57
Batting average	14.25
100s/50s	–/–
Top score	28
Balls bowled	–
Wickets	–
Bowling average	–
5 wickets in innings	–
10 wickets in match	–
Best bowling	–
Catches/stumpings	–/–
- Source: Cricinfo, 17 October 2010

Arthur Martin Pearce (born 14 December 1983) is an English cricketer. Pearce is a right-handed batsman. He was born at Truro, Cornwall.

Pearce made his Minor Counties Championship debut for Cornwall in 2001 against Dorset. From 2001 to 2007, he represented the county in 27 Minor Counties Championship matches, the last of which came against Oxfordshire. Pearce also represented Cornwall in the MCCA Knockout Trophy. His debut in that competition came against Dorset in 2002. From 2002 to 2008, he represented the county in 8 Trophy matches, the last of which came against Herefordshire.

Pearce also represented Cornwall in List A cricket. His debut List A match came against the Somerset Cricket Board in the 1st round of the 2003 Cheltenham & Gloucester Trophy which was played in 2002. From 2002 to 2003, he represented the county in 4 List A matches, the last of which came against the Netherlands in the 1st round of the 2004 Cheltenham & Gloucester Trophy which was held in 2003. In his 4 List-A matches, he scored 57 runs at a batting average of 14.25, with a high score of 28.

Pearce currently plays club cricket for Newquay Cricket Club in the Cornwall Cricket League.
