= Daniel Hall =

Daniel, Dan, or Danny Hall may refer to:

== Arts and entertainment ==
- Daniel Hall (comics), a fictional character in the Sandman comics
- Daniel Hall (poet) (born 1952), American poet
- Dan Hall (musician) (1978–2026), Australian musician
- Dan Llywelyn Hall (born 1980), South Welsh artist
- Danny Hall (drummer) (born 1981), British drummer

== Politics ==
- Daniel Hall (West Virginia politician) (born 1974), American state Senator and former Delegate in West Virginia
- Daniel Hall (Wisconsin politician) (1819–1895), member and Speaker of the Wisconsin State Assembly
- Dan Hall (politician) (born 1952), American politician and former member of the Minnesota State Senate

== Science and technology ==
- Alfred Daniel Hall (1864–1942), sometimes known as Sir Daniel Hall, British agriculturalist

== Sports ==
- Dan Hall (soccer) (born 1999), Fijian soccer defender
- Danny Hall (baseball) (born 1954), American college baseball coach
- Danny Hall (cricketer) (born 1945), English cricketer
- Danny Hall (field hockey) (born 1974), member of the England national field hockey team
- Danny Hall (footballer) (born 1983), English soccer defender
- Daniel Hall (speed skater) (born 2005), Canadian speed skater

== See also ==
- Daniel Hall, a building on the campus of Clemson University, South Carolina, U.S.
- Daniel Hallé (1614–1675), French painter
