= List of Cornwall County Cricket Club grounds =

Cornwall County Cricket Club was established in November 1894. The club has played minor counties cricket since 1897 and played List A cricket from 1970 to 2003, using a number of home grounds during that time. Their first minor counties fixture in 1897 was against Glamorgan, while their first List A match came 73 years later against the same opposition in the 1970 Gillette Cup. One first-class match has been held in the Duchy, when an England XI played the touring Australians in 1899. History was made in 2012, when England Women played India Women in a Women's One Day International at Boscawen Park in Truro, the first time an official international match had been played in Cornwall. The club is nomadic, as such it has no headquarters.

The seventeen grounds that Cornwall have used for home matches since 1897 are listed below, with statistics complete through to the end of the 2012 season.

== Grounds ==
=== Map ===
Locations of grounds used by Cornwall

=== List A ===
Below is a complete list of grounds used by Cornwall County Cricket Club when it was permitted to play List A matches. These grounds have also held Minor Counties Championship and MCCA Knockout Trophy matches.

Name	Location	First	Last	Matches	First	Last	Matches	First	Last	Matches	Refs
Name	Location	List A			Minor Counties Championship			MCCA Trophy			Refs
Roskear	Camborne	15 May 2001 v Cheshire	29 August 2002 v Somerset Cricket Board	2	3 August 1906 v Devon	5 July 2009 v Wiltshire	92	10 July 2001 v Gloucestershire Cricket Board	4 May 2008 v Berkshire	3	
Boscawen Park	Truro	25 April 1970 v Glamorgan	7 May 2003 v Kent	6	23 August 1968 v Devon	still in use	45	14 June 1987 v Wiltshire	still in use	10	
Wheal Eliza	St Austell	27 June 1995 v Middlesex	25 June 1996 v Warwickshire	2	25 July 1982 v Dorset	still in use	28	19 June 1994 v Devon	23 May 2010; Wales Minor Counties	3	

=== Minor Counties ===
Below is a complete list of grounds used by the Cornwall County Cricket Club in Minor Counties Championship and MCCA Knockout Trophy matches.

Name	Location	First	Last	Matches	First	Last	Matches	Refs
Name	Location	Minor Counties Championship			MCCA Trophy			Refs
St Clare Ground	Penzance	27 August 1897 v Glamorgan	30 July 2017 v Hertfordshire	91	only match: 20 July 1999 v Devon		1	
Tremorvah Cricket Ground	Truro	29 June 1904 v Monmouthshire	22 July 1912 v Kent Second XI	11	–	–	0	(Note: One first-class match was played there in 1899 between an England XI and the touring Australians.)
Lux Park	Liskeard	17 August 1904 v Dorset	27 August 1978 v Wiltshire	22	–	–	0	
Lanhydrock Cricket Ground	Lanhydrock	only match: 25 August 1904 v Cambridgeshire		1	–	–	0	
Newquay Cricket Ground	Newquay	7 August 1905 v Dorset	13 August 1906 v Dorset	2	–	–	0	
Port Eliot Cricket Ground	Port Eliot	only match: 29 July 1921 v Berkshire		1	–	–	0	
School Ground	Truro	24 July 1925 v Monmouthshire	2 August 1946 v Dorset	13	–	–	0	
Egloshayle Road	Wadebridge	3 July 1959 v Gloucestershire Second XI	13 June 1988 v Cheshire	23	–	–	0	
Beacon Park	Helston	21 August 1970 v Wiltshire	13 June 1994 v Cheshire	11	17 May 1998 v Dorset	9 July 2000 v Wiltshire	3	
New Road	Callington	16 August 1971 v Dorset	22 August 1973 v Oxfordshire	3	–	–	0	
Treslothian Road	Troon	13 July 1980 v Somerset Second XI	14 July 1985 v Devon	3	–	–	0	
Trewirgie Cricket Ground	Redruth	only match: 8 June 1992 v Cheshire		1	2 May 2010 v Devon	5 June 2012 v Wiltshire	2	
Ladycross Cricket Ground	Werrington	15 June 1998 v Cheshire	15 August 1999 v Berkshire	2	–	–	0	
Cape Cornwall School	St Just	–	–	0	11 June 2000 v Devon	1 June 2008 v Devon	4	
