= Simon Hunt =

Simon Hunt may refer to:

- Pauline Pantsdown (also known as Simon Hunt), Australian satirist and former Australian Senate candidate
- Simon Hunt (footballer) (born 1963), former English footballer
- Simon Hunt (rugby union) (born 1981), English rugby player
- Simon Hunt (cricketer) (born 1962), former English cricketer
