= Roskear =

Sports venue in Camborne, Cornwall, England

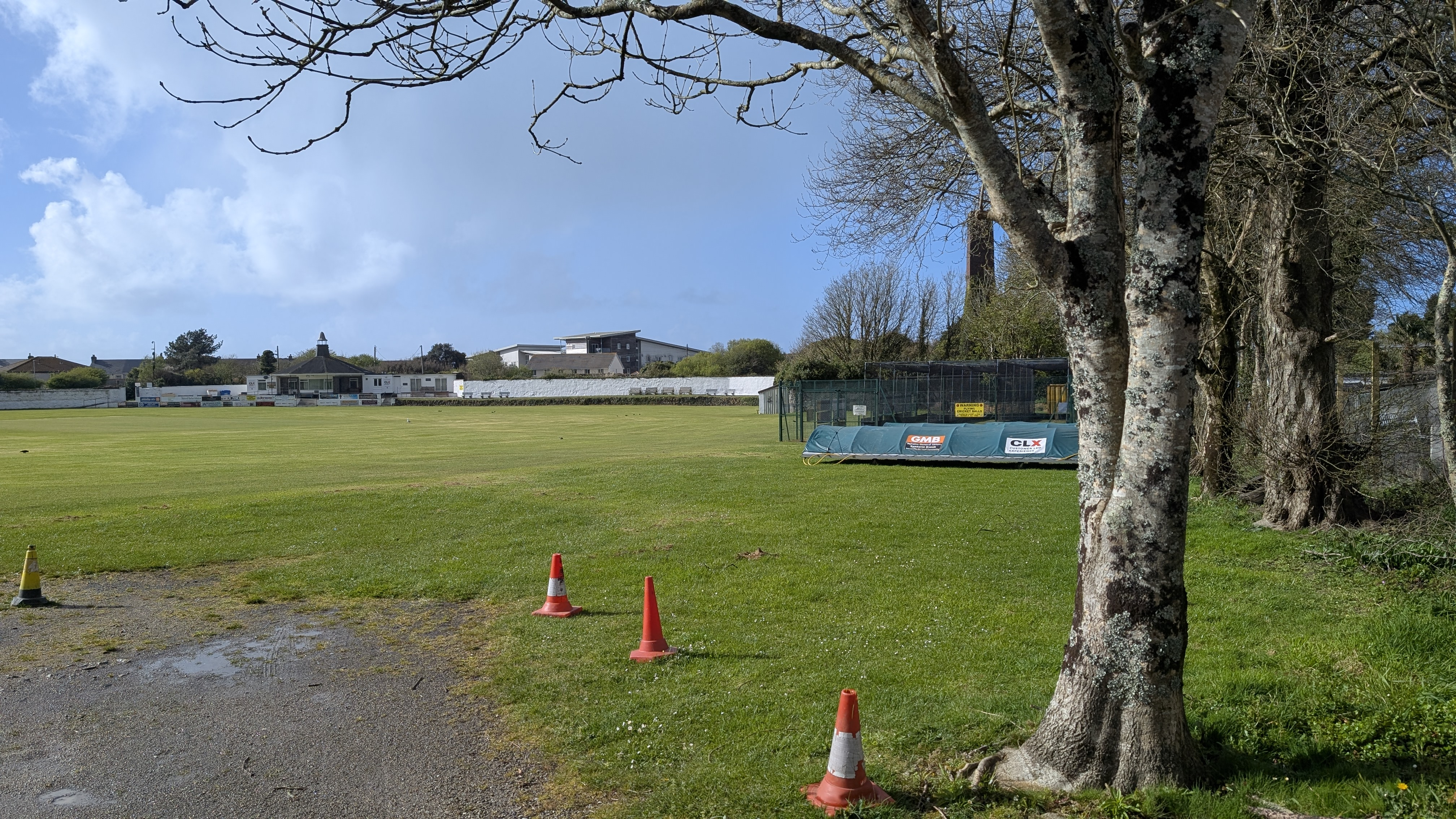
- Interactive map of Roskear

Ground information
- Location: Camborne, Cornwall
- Country: England
- Coordinates: 50.2213°N 5.2881°W
- Establishment: 1905

Team information
Cornwall	(1906–2009)
- As of 6 July 2010; Source: Ground profile

Roskear is a street and area on the eastern edge of Camborne, Cornwall. In the early 1900s, the area had a tram loop.

Roskear is known in the 2000s mostly for its cricket ground, which is located off South Roskear Terrace. The ground is built on the site of the former North Roskear Mine, and is surrounded on all sides by housing. The ground has previously acted as a home ground for Cornwall County Cricket Club and has been the home of Camborne Cricket Club since 1905.

== History ==
Cornwall first played at the ground against Devon in the 1906 Minor Counties Championship.

A single Minor Counties Championship match was played there annually to 1911, after which two fixtures were held there each year until the First World War, as well as after the war in 1921 and 1922.

With the exception of 1931, when two fixtures were held, each season after 1922 and up to World War II saw a single Minor Counties Championship fixture played there annually.

Starting in 1947, the ground returned to hosting two matches per season, an arrangement which lasted until 1958; thereafter a single match was played annually, until 1969.

Between 1970 and 1973, Cornwall didn't play at the ground, but did return in 1974, playing annually there until 1979. A single match was played there in 1981, after which Cornwall did not play at the ground for another decade. They returned there in 1992, playing one Minor Counties Championship match there a season until 2000.

List A cricket was first played there in 2001, when Cornwall played Cheshire in the Cheltenham & Gloucester Trophy, which Cornwall won by 3 wickets. In that same season, the ground hosted its first MCCA Knockout Trophy match, when Cornwall played the Gloucestershire Cricket Board, while the following season they played Devon in the same competition.

A second List A match was played there in the 2003 Cheltenham & Gloucester Trophy, with Somerset Cricket Board as visitors, with Cornwall again winning.

From 2003, the ground hosted six further Minor Counties Championship matches, the last of which saw Wiltshire as the visitors in 2009. A total of 92 Minor Counties Championship matches have been played there.

The last MCCA Knockout Trophy match was played there in 2008 with Berkshire as visitors.

== Cornish wrestling ==
Cornish wrestling tournaments for prizes were held at Roskear cricket ground.

== Records ==
=== List A ===
- Highest team total: 301/8 (50 overs) by Cornwall v Somerset Cricket Board, 2002
- Lowest team total: 256/5 (50 overs), by Cheshire v Cornwall, 2001
- Highest individual innings: 80 by Jonathan Kent for Cornwall v Somerset Cricket Board, 2002
- Best bowling in an innings: 3/54 by Justin Stephens for Cornwall v Somerset Cricket Board, 2002

== See also ==
- Roskear Croft
- Hayle Railway, which ran through Roskear
- List of Cornwall County Cricket Club grounds
- List of cricket grounds in England and Wales
