= Godfrey Furse =

English cricketer

Personal information
- Full name: Godfrey Ronald Furse
- Born: 27 August 1960 (age 66); Launceston, Cornwall, England
- Batting: Left-handed
- Bowling: Right-hand medium

Domestic team information
- Years: Team
- 1985–2001: Cornwall

Career statistics
Competition	LA
Matches	3
Runs scored	4
Batting average	1.33
100s/50s	–/–
Top score	2
Balls bowled	120
Wickets	1
Bowling average	86.00
5 wickets in innings	–
10 wickets in match	–
Best bowling	1/17
Catches/stumpings	–/–
- Source: Cricinfo, 10 October 2010

Godfrey Ronald Furse (born 27 August 1960) is an English cricketer. Furse is a left-handed batsman who bowls right-arm medium pace. He was born at Launceston, Cornwall.

Furse made his Minor Counties Championship debut for Cornwall in 1985 against Shropshire. From 1985 to 2001, he represented the county in 106 Minor Counties Championship matches, the last of which came against Wiltshire. Furse also represented Cornwall in the MCCA Knockout Trophy. His debut in that competition came against Devon in 1986. From 1986 to 1998, he represented the county in 15 Trophy matches, the last of which came against Devon. He was also the first one to call Hossy, Horse.

Furse also represented Cornwall in List A cricket. His debut List A match came against Derbyshire in the 1986 NatWest Trophy. He represented Cornwall in 2 further List A matches against Middlesex in the 1995 NatWest Trophy and Warwickshire in the 1996 NatWest Trophy. In his 3 List-A matches, he scored 4 runs at a batting average of 1.33, with a high score of 2. With the ball he took a single wicket at a bowling average of 86.00, with best figures of 1/17.

Furse currently plays club cricket for Newquay Cricket Club in the Cornwall Cricket League.
