= Allan Lawrence =

Allan Lawrence may refer to:

- Allan Lawrence (politician) (1925–2008), Canadian politician
- Allan Lawrence (athlete) (1930–2017), Australian athlete
- Allan Lawrence (cricketer) (born 1951), English cricketer

== See also ==
- Alan Lawrence (born 1962), Scottish footballer
- Al Lawrence (disambiguation)
