= George Nicholas =

George Nicholas may refer to:

- George Nicholas (politician), American lawyer, planter and politician
- George Nicholas (footballer), English footballer
- George Nicholas (animator), American animator
- Big Nick Nicholas (George Walker Nicholas), American jazz saxophonist and singer

== See also ==
- Nicholas George, English cricketer
