= Brian Reid =

Brian Reid may refer to:

- Brian Reid (computer scientist) (born 1949), computer scientist
- Brian Reid (historian), Canadian military historian
- Brian Reid (footballer) (born 1970), former Scottish footballer and current manager
- Brian Reid (motorcyclist), Irish motorcycle racer
- Brian Holden Reid (born 1952), British military historian

== See also ==
- Brian Read (born 1939), cricketer
- Brian Reade (born 1957), British writer and radio presenter
- Bryan Reid, musician in Truthhorse
