= Tim Edwards (cricketer, born 1974) =

English cricketer

Cricket information
- Batting: Right-handed

Career statistics
| Competition | First-class | List A |
|---|---|---|
| Matches | 10 | 7 |
| Runs scored | 116 | 87 |
| Batting average | 29.00 | 87.00 |
| 100s/50s | 0/0 | 0/1 |
| Top score | 47 | 53* |
| Catches/stumpings | 21/0 | 9/0 |
- Source: CricketArchive, 6 December 2022

Timothy Edwards (born 24 June 1974) is a former English cricketer, who played first-class and List A cricket for Worcestershire and for Somerset County Cricket Club. He also for minor counties cricket (as well as one List A appearance) for Cornwall. He was born in Penzance.

Edwards' batting averages are substantially inflated by a high proportion of not outs: he remained undefeated in seven of 11 first-class innings, and four of five List A innings. However, in Second-XI cricket he made several substantial scores. His two hundreds at this level were both made in the second innings for Worcestershire against Nottinghamshire at Trent Bridge: 100* in 1993 and 101* in 1995; in the latter match he also made 79 in the first innings.

After having made a number of appearances for the seconds since 1991, Edwards made his first-class debut against Oxford University at Worcester in June 1993, having a quiet game in which he took a single catch (to dismiss Richard Montgomerie) and did not bat in either innings. Another uneventful university game, against Cambridge at Fenner's, followed in early May 1994, and later that month he made his County Championship debut against Derbyshire at Derby; this time he took four catches in a drawn game. Edwards played nine first-class games in that 1994 season, taking 20 catches, and in fact never played first-class cricket again thereafter. He also appeared five times in one-day cricket during 1994. His best first-team batting performance was the 47 he hit in a simple Worcestershire victory over Oxford.

Although Edwards appeared on many occasions for Worcestershire II during 1995, he was never recalled to the first team, and after that season he disappeared from county cricket until 2000, when he played for Cornwall. He continued for his native county in 2001, playing twice at List A level in the C&G Trophy. In the first of those games, against Cheshire, his 53* won him the man-of-the-match award.

In the next round of the competition, in a match which proved to be Edwards' last at List A level, Cornwall were knocked out by Sussex, with Edwards playing purely as a batsman as Gavin Edwards took the gloves.
