= Tremorvah Cricket Ground =

Cricket ground in Truro, Cornwall, England

- Interactive map of Tremorvah Cricket Ground

Ground information
- Location: Truro, Cornwall
- Country: England
- Coordinates: 50.2669°N 5.0448°W
- Establishment: c. 1899

Team information
Cornwall	(1904–1912)
- As of 2 September 2012; Source: Ground profile

Tremorvah Cricket Ground was a cricket ground located just outside Truro, Cornwall. The first recorded match to be played on the ground was a first-class match between an England XI and the touring Australians in 1899, which the Australians won by 7 wickets. During the match, Len Braund of the England XI made the highest individual score with the bat of 63, while the Australians Ernie Jones took the best bowling figures with 7/31. This was the only first-class match to be played at the ground. Cornwall first played there in a friendly against Glamorgan in that same year, while they played their first Minor Counties Championship at the ground in 1904 against Monmouthshire. They played a further fixture there against Devon in that same season, with the ground hosting a single Minor Counties Championship match from 1905 to 1912, when Cornwall played their last fixture there against the Kent Second XI. Long since abandoned for cricketing purposes, it is likely the ground was located in the grounds of Alverton Manor, a likely location for it being in the western grounds of the manor, on two sites, one of which is now covered by housing and the other which is partially open land and partially covered by Truro Magistrates Court. The ground remains the only venue in Cornwall to have hosted first-class cricket and the most westerly part of England in which first-class cricket has been played.

== See also ==
- List of Cornwall County Cricket Club grounds
- List of cricket grounds in England and Wales
