= Andrew Snell =

English cricketer

Personal information
- Full name: Andrew Mark Snell
- Born: 19 September 1975 (age 51); Truro, Cornwall, England
- Batting: Right-handed
- Role: Wicketkeeper

Domestic team information
- Years: Team
- 1994–1998: Cornwall

Career statistics
Competition	LA
Matches	2
Runs scored	13
Batting average	–
100s/50s	–/–
Top score	10*
Balls bowled	–
Wickets	–
Bowling average	–
5 wickets in innings	–
10 wickets in match	–
Best bowling	–
Catches/stumpings	2/–
- Source: Cricinfo, 16 October 2010

Andrew Mark Snell (born 18 September 1975) is an English cricketer. Snell is a right-handed batsman who plays primarily as a wicketkeeper. He was born at Truro, Cornwall.

Snell made his Minor Counties Championship debut for Cornwall in 1994 against Wales Minor Counties. From 1994 to 1997, he represented the county in 30 Minor Counties Championship matches, the last of which came against Devon. Snell also represented Cornwall in the MCCA Knockout Trophy. His debut in that competition came against Devon in 1995. From 1995 to 1998, he represented the county in 6 Trophy matches, the last of which came against Dorset.

Snell also represented Cornwall in 2 List A matches. These came against Middlesex in the 1995 NatWest Trophy and Warwickshire in the 1996 NatWest Trophy. In his 2 List-A matches, he scored 13 runs with a high score of 10*. Behind the stumps he took 2 catches.

Snell currently plays club cricket for Paul Cricket Club in the Cornwall Cricket League.
