= Boscawen Park =

Cricket ground in England

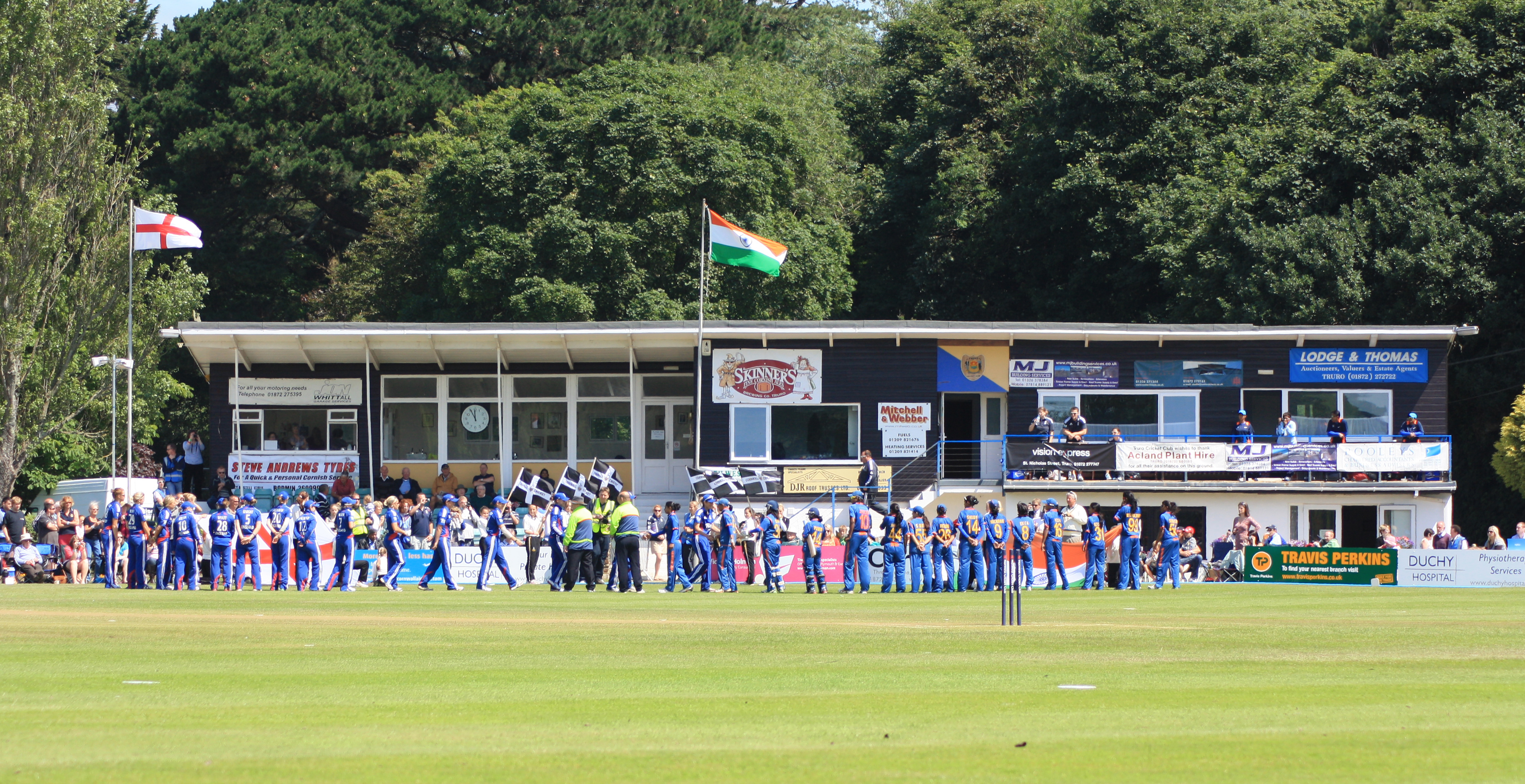
- Interactive map of Boscawen Park

Ground information
- Location: Truro, Cornwall
- Country: England
- Coordinates: 50.2521°N 5.0380°W
- Establishment: 1858
- End names
- City End/Cathedral End; Malpas End/River End

International information
- Only women's ODI: 8 July 2012: England v India

Team information
Cornwall	(1968–present)
- As of 30 September 2011; Source: Ground profile

Boscawen Park is a cricket ground located in recreation grounds along Malpas Road in Truro, Cornwall. The ground is situated directly next to the River Truro, which runs alongside its western side. The end names are the City End to the north and the Malpas End to the south. Alternatively, these ends are also known as the Cathedral End and River End.

== History ==
Boscawen Park is not located in the Boscawen electoral ward but shares the same name. The name probably originates from Edward Boscawen, an admiral and member of parliament from Truro.

Established by 1858, a team representative of Cornwall first played there against an All England Eleven in that same year. Cornwall County Cricket Club first used the ground in July 1895, eight months after the club's founding, when it played a friendly against Devon. Cornwall first played minor counties cricket there over seventy years later, with Devon the visitors in the 1968 Minor Counties Championship. Two years later, the first List A match to be played there came in the 1970 Gillette Cup between Cornwall and Glamorgan, with Glamorgan winning by 72 runs thanks largely to Peter Walker's 51 runs with the bat and 5/21 with the ball. Cornwall played one Minor Counties Championship match per season at the ground during the 1970s, with the ground also hosting its second List A match in the 1977 Gillette Cup with Lancashire at the visitors. Cornwall continued to play one Minor Counties Championship match there per season throughout the 1980s, a pattern which continued into the 1990s.

A new format of minor counties one-day cricket, the MCCA Knockout Trophy was introduced in the mid-1980s, with the ground holding its such match in 1987 with Wiltshire as the visitors, with four more fixtures in that competition played there in 1988, 1990, 1992 and 1994. List A cricket returned to the ground in the 2000 NatWest Trophy with Norfolk as the visitors. Cornwall played three more List A fixtures were played there in the early 2000s, against Sussex in the 2001 Cheltenham & Gloucester Trophy, Worcestershire in the 2002 Cheltenham & Gloucester Trophy and Kent in the 2003 Cheltenham & Gloucester Trophy. The ground continues to hold one Minor Counties Championship match per season, as well as holding five MCCA Knockout Trophy matches since 2006.

The first international cricket match held in Cornwall was played there in 2012, when England women played India women in a Women's One Day International. England Women won the match by 3 wickets. The ground held the final of the 2012 Minor Counties Championship between Cornwall and Buckinghamshire, with Cornwall making history by winning the competition for the first time.

On 7 August 2022, a large wildfire broke out at Boscawen Park.

== Records ==
=== List A ===
- Highest team total: 253/6 (50 overs) by Sussex v Cornwall, 2001
- Lowest team total: 62 (44.1 overs) by Cornwall v Lancashire, 1977
- Highest individual innings: 89 by Chris Adams for Sussex v Cornwall, 2001
- Best bowling in an innings: 5/19 by Charlie Shreck for Cornwall v Worcestershire, 2002

== See also ==
- List of Cornwall County Cricket Club grounds
- List of cricket grounds in England and Wales
