= Gerald Parsons =

English cricketer (1934–2023)

Personal information
- Full name: Gerald Rex Parsons
- Born: 26 January 1934; Okehampton, Devon, England
- Died: 5 February 2023 (aged 89); Beaworthy, Devon, England
- Batting: Right-handed
- Bowling: Right-arm off break

Domestic team information
- Years: Team
- 1966–1973: Cornwall
- Only LA: 25 April 1970 Cornwall v Glamorgan

Career statistics
Competition	List A
Matches	1
Runs scored	6
Batting average	6.00
100s/50s	0/0
Top score	6
Catches/stumpings	1/–
- Source: CricketArchive, 3 January 2010

Gerald Rex Parsons (26 January 1934 – 5 February 2023) was an English cricketer. He was a right-handed batsman and right-arm off-break bowler who played for Cornwall.

Parsons, who played Minor Counties cricket for Cornwall from 1966–1973, made his only List A appearance during the 1970 Gillette Cup, against Glamorgan. Opening the batting and captaining the side, he made six runs before being bowled by Malcolm Nash. He had succeeded Robin Harvey as Cornwall captain in 1970.

Parsons died at the West Heanton Residential Home in Beaworthy, Devon on 5 February 2023, at the age of 89.
