= Brian Laity =

English cricketer

Personal information
- Full name: Brian Laity
- Born: 20 October 1935; Penzance, Cornwall, England
- Died: 22 March 2007 (aged 71); Truro, Cornwall, England
- Batting: Right-handed
- Bowling: Right-arm off break
- Relatives: Danny Hall (brother-in-law)

Domestic team information
- Years: Team
- 1958–1977: Cornwall

Career statistics
Competition	LA
Matches	3
Runs scored	81
Batting average	27.00
100s/50s	–/1
Top score	66
Balls bowled	–
Wickets	–
Bowling average	–
5 wickets in innings	–
10 wickets in match	–
Best bowling	–
Catches/stumpings	–/–
- Source: Cricinfo, 19 October 2010

Brian Laity (20 October 1935 – 22 March 2007) was an English cricketer. Laity was a right-handed batsman who bowled right-arm off break. He was born in Penzance, Cornwall.

Laity made his Minor Counties Championship debut for Cornwall in 1958 against Devon. From 1958 to 1977, he represented the county in 54 Minor Counties Championship matches, the last of which came against Dorset.

Laity also represented Cornwall in 3 List A matches. These against Glamorgan in the 1970 Gillette Cup, Oxfordshire in the 1975 Gillette Cup and Lancashire in the 1977 Gillette Cup. In his 3 List A matches, he scored 81 runs at a batting average of 27.00, with a single half century high score of 66. Laity was a fine driver and powerful hooker of the ball, making 20 centuries in league cricket and scoring more than 3,400 runs for Cornwall.

Laity died at Treliske Hospital in Truro, Cornwall on 22 March 2007.

== Family ==
His brother-in-law, Danny Hall played Minor Counties and List A cricket for Berkshire, as well as Minor Counties cricket for Cornwall.
