= Hurrell =

Hurrell is a surname. Notable people with the surname include:

- Andrew Hurrell, British political scientist and academic
- Frederick Charles Hurrell (1928–2008), Director-General of the RAF Medical Services from 1986 to 1988
- Graham Hurrell (born 1975), English badminton player
- George Hurrell (1904–1992), American photographer
- Jack Hurrell (1931–2003), Welsh rugby union player
- John Hurrell (born 1947), English cricketer
- Konrad Hurrell (born 1991), Tongan rugby league player
- Louise Hurrell (1871–1958), American physician
- Will Hurrell (born 1990), English rugby union player
- William Hurrell (1860–1952), British Anglican priest
- Willie Hurrell (1920–1999), Scottish footballer
