= Kevin Willcock =

English cricketer

Personal information
- Full name: Kevin James Willcock
- Born: 8 March 1973 (age 53); Tavistock, Devon, England
- Batting: Right-handed
- Bowling: Right-arm medium
- Relatives: Eric Willcock (father)

Domestic team information
- Years: Team
- 1993–1998: Cornwall

Career statistics
| Competition | LA |
|---|---|
| Matches | 2 |
| Runs scored | 26 |
| Batting average | 13.00 |
| 100s/50s | –/– |
| Top score | 25 |
| Balls bowled | 144 |
| Wickets | 2 |
| Bowling average | 47.50 |
| 5 wickets in innings | – |
| 10 wickets in match | – |
| Best bowling | 1/43 |
| Catches/stumpings | 1/– |
- Source: Cricinfo, 17 October 2010

Kevin James Willcock (born 8 March 1973) is a former English cricketer. Willcock was a right-handed batsman who bowled right-arm medium pace. He was born at Tavistock, Devon.

Willcock made his Minor Counties Championship debut for Cornwall in 1993 against Devon. From 1993 to 1998, he represented the county in 34 Minor Counties Championship matches, the last of came match against Herefordshire. Willcock also represented Cornwall in the MCCA Knockout Trophy. His debut in that competition came against Devon in 1995. From 1995 to 1998, he represented the county in 7 Trophy matches, the last of which came against Devon.

Willcock also represented Cornwall in 2 List A matches. These came against Middlesex in the 1995 NatWest Trophy and Warwickshire in the 1996 NatWest Trophy. In his 2 List A matches, he scored 26 runs at a batting average of 13.00, with a high score of 25. In the field he took a single catch. With the ball he took 2 wickets at a bowling average of 47.50, with best figures of 1/43.

== Family ==
His father Eric also played List A and Minor Counties for Cornwall.
