= Paul Berryman (cricketer) =

English cricketer (born 1970)

Personal information
- Full name: Kenneth Paul Berryman
- Born: 15 February 1970 (age 56); Truro, Cornwall, England
- Batting: Right-handed
- Bowling: Right-arm medium-fast

Domestic team information
- Years: Team
- 1988-1989, 1995 & 2002: Cornwall

Career statistics
| Competition | LA |
|---|---|
| Matches | 3 |
| Runs scored | 6 |
| Batting average | 3.00 |
| 100s/50s | –/– |
| Top score | 6 |
| Balls bowled | 156 |
| Wickets | 3 |
| Bowling average | 55.00 |
| 5 wickets in innings | – |
| 10 wickets in match | – |
| Best bowling | 2/67 |
| Catches/stumpings | –/– |
- Source: Cricinfo, 17 October 2010

Kenneth Paul Berryman (born 15 February 1970) is a former English cricketer. Berryman was a right-handed batsman who bowled right-arm medium-fast. He was born at Truro, Cornwall.

Berryman made his Minor Counties Championship debut for Cornwall in 1988 against Cheshire. During the 1989 season he played 4 Championship matches for Cornwall, but thereafter would have to wait until 1995 for his next appearance, including his final Minor Counties Championship match against Berkshire. Berryman also represented Cornwall in the MCCA Knockout Trophy. His debut in that competition came against Devon in 1995 in which he still holds the record for the best bowling figures returned by a Cornish bowler in this competition of 5–19 . During that same season he also played a Trophy match against Dorset picking up another 4 wickets in the process. He would have to wait until 2002 for his Trophy appearance for Cornwall, when he played 2 Trophy matches against Wiltshire and Devon, which was his final Trophy match.

Berryman also represented Cornwall in 3 List A matches. These came against Middlesex in the 1995 NatWest Trophy. His next appearance came against Worcestershire in the 2002 Cheltenham & Gloucester Trophy, with his final List A appearance coming against the Somerset Cricket Board in the 1st round of the 2003 Cheltenham & Gloucester Trophy which was played in 2002. In his 3 List A matches, he scored 6 runs at a batting average of 3.00, with a high score of 6. With the ball he took 3 wickets at a bowling average of 55.00, with best figures of 2/67.
