= Nigel Cock =

English cricketer

Personal information
- Full name: Nigel George Cock
- Born: 24 November 1946 (age 79); Penzance, Cornwall, England
- Batting: Right-handed
- Bowling: Wicketkeeper

Domestic team information
- Years: Team
- 1972-1981: Cornwall

Career statistics
Competition	LA
Matches	2
Runs scored	12
Batting average	6.00
100s/50s	–/–
Top score	7
Balls bowled	–
Wickets	–
Bowling average	–
5 wickets in innings	–
10 wickets in match	–
Best bowling	–
Catches/stumpings	1/–
- Source: Cricinfo, 18 October 2010

Nigel George Cock (born 24 November 1946) is a former English cricketer. Cock was a right-handed batsman who played primarily as a wicketkeeper. He was born at Penzance, Cornwall.

Cock made his Minor Counties Championship debut for Cornwall in 1972 against Devon. From 1972 to 1981, he represented the county in 29 Minor Counties Championship matches, the last of which came against Berkshire.

Cock also represented Cornwall in 2 List A matches. These came against Oxfordshire in the 1975 Gillette Cup and Devon in the 1980 Gillette Cup. In his 2 List A matches, he scored 12 runs at a batting average of 6.00, with a high score of 7. Behind the stumps he took a single catch.
