= Philip Johns =

English cricketer

Personal information
- Full name: Philip Ivor Johns
- Born: 21 July 1956 (age 70); Fowey, Cornwall, England
- Batting: Right-handed
- Bowling: Right-arm fast-medium

Domestic team information
- Years: Team
- 1977-1982 & 1988: Cornwall

Career statistics
Competition	LA
Matches	2
Runs scored	2
Batting average	1.00
100s/50s	–/–
Top score	2
Balls bowled	144
Wickets	3
Bowling average	22.33
5 wickets in innings	–
10 wickets in match	–
Best bowling	2/26
Catches/stumpings	–/–
- Source: Cricinfo, 18 October 2010

Philip Ivor Johns (born 21 July 1956) is a former English cricketer. Johns was a right-handed batsman who bowled right-arm fast-medium. He was born at Fowey, Cornwall.

Johns made his Minor Counties Championship debut for Cornwall in 1977 against Dorset. From 1977 to 1988, he represented the county in 25 Minor Counties Championship matches, the last of which came against Cheshire, following a 6-year break from the team. Johns represented Cornwall in a single MCCA Knockout Trophy match against Dorset in 1988.

Johns also represented Cornwall in 2 List A matches. These came against Lancashire in the 1977 Gillette Cup and Devon in the 1980 Gillette Cup. In his 2 List A matches, he scored 2 runs at a batting average of 1.00, with a high score of 2. With the ball he took 3 wickets at a bowling average of 22.33, with best figures of 2/26.
