= Christopher Trudgeon =

English cricketer

Personal information
- Born: 17 June 1951 (age 73); St Austell, Cornwall, United Kingdom
- Batting: Right-handed

Domestic team information
- Years: Team
- 1981–1987: Cornwall

Christopher Trudgeon (born 17 June 1951) is an English former cricketer. He was a right-handed batsman who played for Cornwall. He was born in St Austell, Cornwall, UK.

Trudgeon made his only List A appearance for the side during the 1980 season, against Devon. From the upper-middle order, he scored 9 runs.

Trudgeon played for Cornwall in the Minor Counties Championship between 1981 and 1987.
