= Albert Lawrence =

Albert Lawrence may refer to:

- Bert Lawrence (1923–2007), Canadian politician and lawyer
- Bert Lawrence (footballer) (1902–1975), Australian footballer
- Al Lawrence (sprinter) (born 1961), Jamaican former athlete
- Albert G. Lawrence (1836–1887), American diplomat and soldier
