= Peter Kendall (cricketer) =

English cricketer

Personal information
- Full name: Charles Peter Cartwright Kendall
- Born: 29 December 1938 (age 87); Penryn, Cornwall, England
- Batting: Left-handed
- Bowling: Right-arm fast-medium

Domestic team information
- Years: Team
- 1961 & 1966-1975: Cornwall

Career statistics
Competition	LA
Matches	2
Runs scored	10
Batting average	5.00
100s/50s	–/–
Top score	10
Balls bowled	126
Wickets	1
Bowling average	83.00
5 wickets in innings	–
10 wickets in match	–
Best bowling	1/42
Catches/stumpings	–/–
- Source: Cricinfo, 18 October 2010

Charles Peter Cartwright Kendall (born 29 December 1938) is a former English cricketer. Kendall was a left-handed batsman who bowled right-arm fast-medium. He was born at Penryn, Cornwall.

Kendall made his Minor Counties Championship debut for Cornwall in 1961 against Dorset. From 1961 to 1975, he represented the county in 36 Minor Counties Championship matches, the last of which came against Dorset.

Kendall also represented Cornwall in 2 List A matches. These came against Glamorgan in the 1970 Gillette Cup and Oxfordshire in the 1975 Gillette Cup. In his 2 List A matches, he scored 10 runs at a batting average of 5.00, with a high score of 10. With the ball he took a single wicket at a bowling average of 83.00, with best figures of 1/42.
