= Michael Snowdon =

English cricketer

Michael Snowdon (born 3 April 1947) was an English cricketer. He was a right-handed batsman and right-arm medium-pace bowler who played for Cornwall. He was born in Callington.

Snowdon made a single List A appearance for the side, during the 1975 season, against Oxfordshire. From the lower order, he scored 4 runs.

Snowdon bowled 8.3 overs during the match, taking figures of 0-30.

Snowdon's brother, Andrew, made a single List A appearance for Cornwall during the 1986 season.
