= Naeem Akhtar (cricketer) =

Pakistani cricketer (born 1967)

Personal information
- Full name: Naeem Akhtar
- Born: 2 December 1967 (age 58); Faisalabad, Punjab, Pakistan
- Batting: Right-handed
- Bowling: Right-arm fast-medium

Domestic team information
- Years: Team
- 2002: Derbyshire Cricket Board
- 1999: Cornwall
- 1997/98-2002/03: Khan Research Laboratories
- 1995/96: Rawalpindi B
- 1994/95-1995/96: Rawalpindi A
- 1990/91-2003/04: Rawalpindi

Career statistics
Competition	FC	LA
Matches	101	99
Runs scored	3,013	1,430
Batting average	21.99	21.34
100s/50s	2/10	0/6
Top score	157*	81
Balls bowled	15,274	4,411
Wickets	322	123
Bowling average	21.46	23.83
5 wickets in innings	17	1
10 wickets in match	2	n/a
Best bowling	10/28	5/20
Catches/stumpings	52/–	21/–
- Source: Cricinfo, 17 October 2010

Naeem Akhtar (born 2 December 1967) is a former Pakistani cricketer. Akhtar was a right-handed batsman who bowled right-arm fast-medium.

Akhtar made his first-class debut for Rawalpindi against Peshawar in the 1990/91 season. Akhtar represented the main Rawalpindi team in first-class cricket from 1990/91 to 2003/04 in 57 first-class matches, as well as Rawalpindi A and Rawalpindi A. He also represented Khan Research Laboratories in 32 first-class matches. His final first-class match came in the 2003/04 season for Rawalpindi against Quetta. Throughout his first-class career, Akhtar was noted as a consistent all-rounder. With the bat he scored 3,013 runs at a batting average of 21.99, with 10 half centuries and 2 centuries, one of which included his career first-class high score of 157* against Allied Bank Limited in the 1998/99 season. With the ball, he took 322 wickets at an impressive bowling average of 21.46, with 17 five wicket hauls and 2 ten wicket hauls, one of which came when he took 10 wickets in a single innings against Peshawar in 1995/96.

Akhtar also made his debut in List A cricket for Rawalpindi in the 1990/91 season against Peshawar. Akhtar represented the main Rawalpindi team in List A cricket 50 times from the 1990/91 to 2000/01 season. In addition, he also represented Rawalpindi A in 11 matches and Khan Research Laboratories in 35 matches from the 1997/98 to 2001/02 season. During the 1999 English cricket season, Akhtar played a single List A match for Cornwall against Cumberland in the 1999 NatWest Trophy. He also played a single MCCA Knockout Trophy match against the Somerset Cricket Board. In 2002, he played a single List A match for the Derbyshire Cricket Board against the Middlesex Cricket Board in the 1st round of the 2003 Cheltenham & Gloucester Trophy, which was held in 2002; This was his final List A match. In his total of 99 List A matches, he scored 1,430 runs at an average of 21.34, with a 6 half centuries and a high score of 81. With the ball he took 123 wickets at an average of 23.83, with a single five wicket haul which gave him best figures of 5/20.

Despite a notable career in domestic cricket, Akhtar never represented the Pakistan national cricket team, although he did make a single List A appearance for Pakistan A in December 1995 against England A.
