= Nicholas Carter (cricketer) =

English cricketer

Personal information
- Full name: Nicholas Anthony Carter
- Born: 29 September 1978 (age 48); Truro, Cornwall, England
- Batting: Right-handed
- Bowling: Right-arm medium

Domestic team information
- Years: Team
- 1997–2003: Cornwall

Career statistics
Competition	LA
Matches	2
Runs scored	10
Batting average	–
100s/50s	–/–
Top score	10*
Balls bowled	104
Wickets	3
Bowling average	22.00
5 wickets in innings	–
10 wickets in match	–
Best bowling	2/21
Catches/stumpings	–/–
- Source: Cricinfo, 17 October 2010

Nicholas Anthony Carter (born 29 September 1978) is a former English cricketer. Carter was a right-handed batsman who bowled right-arm medium pace. He was born at Truro, Cornwall.

Carter made his Minor Counties Championship debut for Cornwall in 1997 against Cheshire. From 1997 to 2002, he represented the county in 4 Minor Counties Championship matches, the last of which came against Wales Minor Counties. Carter also represented Cornwall in the MCCA Knockout Trophy. His debut in that competition came against Devon in 2002. From 2002 to 2003, he represented the county in 3 Trophy matches, the last of which came against Norfolk.

Carter also represented Cornwall in 2 List A matches. These came against the Somerset Cricket Board and Wales Minor Counties in the 1st and 2nd rounds respectively of the 2003 Cheltenham & Gloucester Trophy which were played in 2002. In his 2 List A matches, he scored 10 runs with a high score of 10* and with the ball he took 3 wickets at a bowling average of 22.00, with best figures of 2/21.
