= Mark George (English cricketer) =

English cricketer

- Born: 8 July 1975 (age 50)
- Occupation: Cricketer

Mark George (born Winston Mark George on 8 July 1975) was an English cricketer. He was a left-handed batsman and right-arm off-break bowler who played for Cornwall. He was born in Penzance.

George, who made his Minor Counties Championship debut for the team during the 1996 season, and who still plays for the side as of 2009, made his only List an appearance during the 2000 season, against Norfolk. From the middle order, he scored 4 runs.

As of 2009 George still played for St. Just in the Cornwall Premier League. His brother, Nicholas George, also played List A cricket for the side, and also plays for St. Just.
