= Christopher Lovell =

English cricketer

Personal information
- Full name: Christopher Charles Lovell
- Born: 1 June 1967 (age 59); St Austell, Cornwall, England
- Batting: Right-handed
- Bowling: Right-arm medium-fast

Domestic team information
- Years: Team
- 1986-1996: Cornwall

Career statistics
Competition	LA
Matches	3
Runs scored	8
Batting average	2.66
100s/50s	–/–
Top score	7
Balls bowled	216
Wickets	4
Bowling average	66.00
5 wickets in innings	–
10 wickets in match	–
Best bowling	2/107
Catches/stumpings	1/–
- Source: Cricinfo, 18 October 2010

Christopher Charles Lovell (born 1 June 1967) is a former English cricketer. Lovell was a right-handed batsman who bowled right-arm medium-fast. He was born at St Austell, Cornwall.

Lovell made his Minor Counties Championship debut for Cornwall in 1986 against Buckinghamshire. From 1986 to 1996, he represented the county in 55 Minor Counties Championship matches, the last of which came against Devon. Lovell also represented Cornwall in the MCCA Knockout Trophy. His debut in that competition came against Wiltshire in 1988. From 1988 to 1995, he represented the county in 10 Trophy matches, the last of which came against Dorset.

Lovell also represented Cornwall in 3 List A matches. These came against Derbyshire in the 1986 NatWest Trophy, Middlesex in the 1995 NatWest Trophy and Warwickshire in the 1996 NatWest Trophy. In his 3 List A matches, he scored 8 runs at a batting average of 2.66, with a high score of 7. In the field he took a single catch. With the ball he took 4 wickets at a bowling average of 66.00, with best figures of 2/107.
