= Timothy Walton (cricketer, born 1967) =

English cricketer (born 1967)

Timothy Walton (born Richard Timothy Walton on 1 June 1967) was an English cricketer. He was a left-handed batsman who played for Cornwall. He was born in Newquay.

Walton, who played Minor Counties cricket for the team between 1986 and 1996, made his only List A appearance during the 1995 season, against Middlesex. From the upper-middle order, he scored 39 runs.
