= Andrew Snowdon =

English cricketer

Personal information
- Full name: Andrew Edward Snowdon
- Born: 26 September 1965 (age 61); Plymouth, Devon, England
- Batting: Left-handed
- Bowling: Right-arm medium
- Relatives: Michael Snowdon (brother)

Domestic team information
- Years: Team
- 1983–1986: Cornwall

Career statistics
Competition	List A
Matches	1
Runs scored	9
Batting average	9.00
100s/50s	–/–
Top score	9
Balls bowled	72
Wickets	0
Bowling average	–
5 wickets in innings	–
10 wickets in match	–
Best bowling	–
Catches/stumpings	–/–
- Source: Cricinfo, 21 September 2023

Andrew Snowdon (born 26 September 1965) is an English cricketer. He is a left-handed batsman and right-arm medium-pace bowler who played for Cornwall. He was born in Plymouth.

Having represented the team in the Minor Counties Championship between 1983 and 1986, Snowdon made a single List A appearance for the side, in his final year at the club, against Derbyshire. From the middle order, he scored 9 runs. He bowled 12 overs during the match, taking figures of 0-97.

His brother, Michael Snowdon, made a single List A appearance for Cornwall during the 1975 season.
