= Stephen Eva =

English cricketer (born 1967)

Stephen Eva (born 17 July 1967) was an English cricketer. He was a left-handed batsman and wicket-keeper who played for the Cornwall County Cricket Club. He was born in Redruth, England.

Eva, who played Minor Counties cricket for the team between 1986 and 1990, made his only List A appearance during the 1986 season, against the Derbyshire County Cricket Club. From the tailend, he scored 0 not out.
