= William Edwards (Cornwall cricketer) =

English cricketer (born 1938)

William Edwards (born 12 October 1938) was an English cricketer. He was a left-handed batsman who played for Cornwall. He was born in Goldsithney.

Edwards, who made his Minor Counties Championship debut for the team in 1970, made his only List A appearance during the 1975 season, his last at the club, against Oxfordshire. From the opening order, he scored 6 runs.
