= Michael Hands =

English cricketer (born 1951)

Michael Hands (born 13 September 1951) was an English cricketer. He was a right-handed batsman who played for Cornwall. He was born in Cheltenham.

Hands, who played for Cornwall in the Minor Counties Championship between 1974 and 1978, made a single List A appearance for the side, during the 1977 season, against Lancashire. From the opening order, he scored 5 runs.

Between 2000 and 2004, Hands umpired matches in the Second XI Championship and Second XI Trophy.
