= Steven Pope =

South African cricketer

Personal information
- Full name: Steven Charles Pope
- Born: 15 November 1972 (age 53); East London, Cape Province, South Africa
- Batting: Right-handed
- Bowling: Leg break
- Role: Occasional wicketkeeper

Domestic team information
- Years: Team
- 2003/04: Eastern Cape
- 2004/05-2005/06: Warriors
- 2000–2003: Cornwall
- 1999: Huntingdonshire
- 1995/96-2005/06: Border
- 1995/96: Border B
- 1993/94-1994/95: Eastern Province
- 1992/93-1994/95: Eastern Province B

Career statistics
Competition	FC	LA	T20
Matches	109	106	12
Runs scored	5,958	2,660	116
Batting average	32.91	31.29	12.88
100s/50s	12/27	–/21	–/–
Top score	156*	98*	34
Balls bowled	2,525	1,306	21
Wickets	48	29	1
Bowling average	31.27	33.55	27.00
5 wickets in innings	2	–	–
10 wickets in match	–	–	–
Best bowling	7/62	4/38	1/19
Catches/stumpings	81/2	43/3	4/–
- Source: Cricinfo, 15 September 2010

Steven Charles Pope (born 15 November 1972) is a South African former cricketer. Pope was a right-handed batsman who bowled leg break and occasionally played as a wicketkeeper. Pope was born at East London, Cape Province.

In a career that lasted 14 seasons, he represented Eastern Cape, Border, Border B, Warriors, Huntingdonshire, Cornwall, Eastern Province and Eastern Province B.

Something of a journeyman within South Africa, Pope did play 9 List-A matches for Cornwall, where his family originate, and one for Huntingdonshire in English county cricket. In his 14-year career, he forged a successful, if inconsistent first-class career. He played 93 first-class matches, where he scored 5,958 runs at a batting average of 32.91, with 27 half centuries and 12 centuries. His highest score in first-class cricket was 156*. With the ball he took 48 wickets at a bowling average of 31.27, with 2 five wicket hauls and best figures of 7/62. In List-A cricket, he played a total of 106 matches, where he scored 2,660 runs at an average of 31.29. In the process, he made 21 half centuries, but no centuries, with a high score of 98*. He also took 29 wickets in List-A cricket, at a bowling average of 22.55 apiece, with best figures of 4/38.

Toward the end of his career, Twenty20 cricket was introduced, with Pope playing 6 matches each in the format for Eastern Cape and later Warriors. In his 12 matches he scored 116 runs at an average of 12.88, with a high score of 34.

== Family ==
His father Charles Pope played first-class and List-A cricket for Border. His uncle Ken McEwan also played first-class and List-A cricket.
