= Malcolm Dunstan =

English cricketer

Personal information
- Full name: Malcolm Stephen Thomas Dunstan
- Born: 14 October 1950 (age 76); Redruth, Cornwall, England
- Batting: Right-handed
- Bowling: Right-arm medium

Domestic team information
- Years: Team
- 1979: Minor Counties South
- 1977–1978: Minor Counties West
- 1971–1974: Gloucestershire
- 1969–1989: Cornwall

Career statistics
Competition	First-class	List A
Matches	12	23
Runs scored	283	216
Batting average	16.64	10.80
100s/50s	–/1	–/–
Top score	52	33
Balls bowled	–	–
Wickets	–	–
Bowling average	–	–
5 wickets in innings	–	–
10 wickets in match	–	–
Best bowling	–	–
Catches/stumpings	4/–	5/–
- Source: Cricinfo, 19 October 2010

Malcolm Stephen Thomas Dunstan (born 14 October 1950) is a former English cricketer. Dunstan was a right-handed batsman who bowled right-arm medium pace. He was born at Redruth, Cornwall.

Dunstan made his début in county cricket for Cornwall in the 1969 Minor Counties Championship against Devon. In 1970 he made his début in List A cricket playing for Cornwall against Glamorgan in the 1970 Gillette Cup. The following year he made his first-class début for Gloucestershire against the touring Pakistanis. From 1971 to 1974, he represented the county in twelve first-class matches, the last of which came against Warwickshire in the County Championship. In his twelve first-class matches, he scored 283 runs at a batting average of 16.64, with a single half century high score of 52. In the field he took four catches. Dunstan also played List A cricket for Gloucestershire. His List A début for the county came against Glamorgan in the 1973 Gillette Cup. From 1973 to 1974, he represented the county in 11 List A matches, the last of which came against Lancashire in the 1974 John Player League.

During his time at Gloucestershire, Dunstan continued to represent Cornwall in the Minor Counties Championship. After his career with Gloucestershire, he continued to appear for the county. From his first Minor Counties Championship match for Cornwall in 1969 until 1989, he represented the county in 112 Championship matches, the last of which was against Devon. He also appeared for Cornwall in the MCCA Knockout Trophy, making his début in that competition against Devon in 1984. From 1984 to 1988, he represented the county in eight Trophy matches, the last of which was against Dorset.

Despite leaving Gloucestershire, Dunstan continued to play List A cricket; he played four further List A matches for Cornwall, including his final one against Derbyshire in the 1986 NatWest Trophy, as well as six matches for Minor Counties West between 1977 and 1978 in the Benson and Hedges Cup and a single match for Minor Counties South against Gloucestershire in the 1979 Benson and Hedges Cup. In his combined career total of 23 List A matches, he scored 216 runs at an average of 10.80, with a high score of 33. He also captained Cornwall on occasion.
