= Alex Machin =

English cricketer (born 1949)

Alex Machin (born 17 April 1949) is an English cricketer. He is a right-handed batsman and right-arm medium-pace bowler who played for Cornwall. He was born in Plymouth.

Machin, who represented the side in the Minor Counties Championship and Minor Counties Trophy between 1978 and 1985, made a single List A appearance for the side, during the 1980 Gillette Cup, against Devon. He scored a duck.

He took figures of 0-23 from 12 overs of bowling.
