= Robin Harvey =

English sportsman

Robin Harvey was a sportsman from St Columb Major in Cornwall. He was educated at Blundell's School and formally represented his County in both Cricket (1959–1971) and Rugby.

== County cricket ==
He was captain of Cornwall County Cricket Club. In 1969 he was awarded the Wilfred Rhodes Trophy for the highest batting average in the Minor Counties Cricket Championship. He scored 519 runs with an average of 57.66.

=== Teams played for ===
- Cornwall (1959–1971)
- Miscellaneous Southern Schools (1959)
- Public Schools (1959)
- Old Blundellians (1969)
- Johannesburg Wanderers (1973)

== County rugby ==
Harvey played for Cornwall County team on eight occasions. His father Geoffrey Harvey was also an accomplished rugby player and was captain of The Hornets RFC.

== See also ==
- Jack Crapp - Another cricketer from same town
