= Eric Willcock =

English cricketer

Personal information
- Full name: Eric George Willcock
- Born: 28 September 1947 (age 79); St. Ives, Cornwall, England
- Batting: Left-handed
- Bowling: Right-arm off break
- Relatives: Kevin Willcock (son)

Domestic team information
- Years: Team
- 1967-1987: Cornwall

Career statistics
Competition	LA
Matches	5
Runs scored	79
Batting average	15.80
100s/50s	–/–
Top score	43
Balls bowled	–
Wickets	–
Bowling average	–
5 wickets in innings	–
10 wickets in match	–
Best bowling	–
Catches/stumpings	5/–
- Source: Cricinfo, 18 October 2010

Eric George Willcock (born 28 September 1947) is a former English cricketer. Willcock was a left-handed batsman who bowled right-arm off break. He was born at St. Ives, Cornwall.

Willcock made his Minor Counties Championship debut for Cornwall in 1967 against Devon. From 1967 to 1987, he represented the county in 108 Minor Counties Championship matches, the last of which came against Wiltshire. Willcock also represented Cornwall in the MCCA Knockout Trophy. His debut in that competition came against Devon in 1984. From 1984 to 1987, he represented the county in 4 Trophy matches, the last of which came against Wiltshire.

Willcock also represented Cornwall in List A cricket. His List A debut came against Glamorgan in the 1970 Gillette Cup. From 1970 to 1986, he represented the county in 5 List A matches, the last of which came against Derbyshire in the 1986 NatWest Trophy. In his 5 List A matches, he scored 79 runs at a batting average of 15.80, with a high score of 43. In the field he took 5 catches.

== Family ==
His son Kevin also played List A and Minor Counties cricket for Cornwall.
