= Brian Read =

English cricketer (born 1939)

Brian Read (born 7 March 1939) was an English cricketer. He was a right-handed batsman and right-arm medium-fast bowler who played for Cornwall. He was born in Camborne.

Read, who made his Minor Counties Championship debut for the team in 1957, made his only List A appearance during the 1970 season, his last at the club, against Glamorgan. From the tailend, he scored a duck.

Read bowled 12 overs in the match, taking figures of 1-30.
