= Gavin Edwards (politician) =

South African politician

Gavin Edwards MPL

Member of the North West Provincial Legislature
- Incumbent
- Assumed office 22 May 2019

Personal details
- Born: Gavin George Edwards
- Party: Democratic Alliance
- Occupation: Member of the Provincial Legislature
- Profession: Politician

Gavin George Edwards is a South African politician who is a Member of the North West Provincial Legislature representing the Democratic Alliance. Previously, he served as a councillor of the JB Marks Local Municipality. He is also a Constituency Head at DA Constituency Area: DASO (Constituency Area)

== Political career ==
Edwards is a member of the Democratic Alliance. He was the ward councillor for ward 2 of the JB Marks Local Municipality. During his tenure on the JB Marks municipal council, he criticised the speaker for not attending an Integrated Development Plan (IDP) meeting in October 2018.

Following his election to the North West Provincial Legislature in May 2019, he was appointed the DA's spokesperson for social development, education and health.

In March 2021, he was elected chair of the Portfolio Committee on Health and Social Development.
