= Hannah Stacey =

Hannah Stacey from St Eval in Cornwall, is the current UK women's free-diving record holder.

She was also stunt double for Kelly Brook in the film Fishtales, in which she wore a complete mermaid costume in scenes requiring advanced diving techniques.

In 2004 she was World Female Freediver of the Year.

== Records held ==
- UK Constant Weight UK Record: 54 metres
- UK Dynamic Apnea Record: 119 metres
