= Julian Cradick =

English cricketer

Personal information
- Full name: Julian Michael Cradick
- Born: 27 November 1947 (age 78); St Dominic, Cornwall, England
- Batting: Right-handed

Domestic team information
- Years: Team
- 1984-1986: Cornwall

Career statistics
Competition	LA
Matches	1
Runs scored	10
Batting average	10.00
100s/50s	–/–
Top score	10
Balls bowled	–
Wickets	–
Bowling average	–
5 wickets in innings	–
10 wickets in match	–
Best bowling	–
Catches/stumpings	–/–
- Source: Cricinfo, 18 October 2010

Julian Michael Cradick (born 27 November 1947) is a former English cricketer. Cradick was a right-handed batsman. He was born at St Dominick, Cornwall.

Cradick made his Minor Counties Championship debut for Cornwall in 1984 against Devon. From 1984 to 1986, he represented the county in 15 Minor Counties Championship matches, the last of which came against Berkshire. Cradick represented Cornwall in a single MCCA Knockout Trophy match against Dorset in 1985.

Cradick also represented Cornwall in a single List A match against Derbyshire in the 1986 NatWest Trophy. In his only List A match he scored 10 runs.
