= Gary Thomas (cricketer, born 1973) =

English cricketer

Personal information
- Full name: Gary Malcolm Thomas
- Born: 31 October 1973 (age 53); Penzance, Cornwall, England
- Batting: Right-handed
- Bowling: Right-arm medium

Domestic team information
- Years: Team
- 1992-present: Cornwall

Career statistics
Competition	LA
Matches	12
Runs scored	115
Batting average	9.58
100s/50s	–/–
Top score	44
Balls bowled	48
Wickets	–
Bowling average	–
5 wickets in innings	–
10 wickets in match	–
Best bowling	–
Catches/stumpings	3/–
- Source: Cricinfo, 17 October 2010

Gary Malcolm Thomas (born 31 October 1973) is an English cricketer. Thomas is a right-handed batsman who bowled right-arm medium pace. He was born at Penzance, Cornwall.

Thomas made his Minor Counties Championship debut for Cornwall in 1992 against Dorset. From 1992 to present, he has represented the county in 108 Minor Counties Championship matches. Thomas also represents Cornwall in the MCCA Knockout Trophy. His debut in that competition came against Dorset in 1994. From 1994 to present, he has represented the county in 46 Trophy matches. From 1999 to 2001, he was the Cornwall captain.

Thomas has also represented Cornwall in List A cricket. His debut List A match came against Middlesex in the 1995 NatWest Trophy. From 1995 to 2003, he represented the county in 12 List A matches, the last of which came against the Netherlands in the 1st round of the 2004 Cheltenham & Gloucester Trophy which was played in 2003. In his 12 List A matches, he scored 115 runs at a batting average of 9.58, with a high score of 44. In the field he took 3 catches.
