= Allan Lawrence (cricketer) =

English cricketer (born 1951)

Allan Lawrence (born 6 February 1951) was an English cricketer. He was a right-handed batsman and right-arm medium-fast bowler who played for Cornwall. He was born in Penzance.

Lawrence, who played for Cornwall in the Minor Counties Championship between 1972 and 1978, made a single List A appearance for the side, during the 1977 season, against Lancashire. Lawrence bowled 12 overs in the match, conceding 26 runs and taking no wickets. When Cornwall batted, he went in at No 8 and was out for a duck.
