= Justin Stephens =

English cricketer (born 1979)

Personal information
- Full name: Justin Christopher John Stephens
- Born: 12 August 1979 (age 47); Penzance, Cornwall, England
- Batting: Right-handed
- Bowling: Right-arm medium

Domestic team information
- Years: Team
- 1998-present: Cornwall

Career statistics
Competition	LA
Matches	9
Runs scored	97
Batting average	32.33
100s/50s	–/–
Top score	31*
Balls bowled	507
Wickets	13
Bowling average	25.00
5 wickets in innings	–
10 wickets in match	–
Best bowling	3/54
Catches/stumpings	3/–
- Source: Cricinfo, 17 October 2010

Justin Christopher John Stephens (born 12 August 1979) is an English former cricketer. Stephens is a right-handed batsman who bowls right-arm medium pace. He was born at Penzance, Cornwall.

Stephens made his Minor Counties Championship debut for Cornwall in 1998 against Dorset. From 1998 to 2007, he represented the county in 36 Minor Counties Championship matches, the last of which came against Berkshire. Stephens has also represented Cornwall in the MCCA Knockout Trophy. His debut in that competition came against Devon in 1998. From 1995 to present, he has represented the county in 19 Trophy matches.

Stephens also represented Cornwall in List A matches. His debut List A match came against Cumberland in the 1999 NatWest Trophy. From 1999 to 2003, he represented the county in 9 matches, the last of which came Kent in the 2003 Cheltenham & Gloucester Trophy. In his 9 List A matches, he scored 97 runs at a batting average of 32.33, with a high score of 31*. With the ball he took 13 wickets at a bowling average of 25.00, with best figures of 3/54.
