= Simon Hunt (cricketer) =

English cricketer

Personal information
- Full name: Simon Alexander Hunt
- Born: 26 May 1962 (age 64); Guildford, Surrey, England
- Batting: Right-handed
- Bowling: Right-arm medium

Domestic team information
- Years: Team
- 1984-1993: Cornwall

Career statistics
Competition	LA
Matches	1
Runs scored	2
Batting average	2.00
100s/50s	–/–
Top score	2
Balls bowled	72
Wickets	–
Bowling average	–
5 wickets in innings	–
10 wickets in match	–
Best bowling	–
Catches/stumpings	–/–
- Source: Cricinfo, 18 October 2010

Simon Alexander Hunt (born 26 May 1962) is a former English cricketer. Hunt was a right-handed batsman who bowled right-arm medium pace. He was born at Guildford, Surrey.

Hunt made his Minor Counties Championship debut for Cornwall in 1984 against Cheshire. From 1984 to 1994, he represented the county in 13 Minor Counties Championship matches, the last of which came against Shropshire. Hunt also represented Cornwall in the MCCA Knockout Trophy. His debut in that competition came against Devon in 1984. From 1984 to 1993, he represented the county in 4 Trophy matches, the last of which came against Wiltshire.

Lovell also represented Cornwall in a single List A match against Derbyshire in the 1986 NatWest Trophy.
