= Alfred Lawrence =

Alfred Lawrence may refer to:

- Alfred Oscar Lawrence (1904–1986), Victorian forester and community leader
- Alfred Lawrence, 1st Baron Trevethin (1843–1936), British lawyer and judge
- Alfred Clive Lawrence (1876–1926), British barrister
