= Neil Edwards (cricketer) =

English cricketer

Personal information
- Full name: Neil James Edwards
- Born: 14 October 1983 (age 43); Truro, Cornwall, England
- Height: 6 ft 3 in (1.91 m)
- Batting: Left-handed
- Bowling: Right-arm medium pace

Domestic team information
- Years: Team
- 2001–2009: Somerset
- 2010–2012: Nottinghamshire (squad no. 15)

Career statistics
Competition	FC	List A	T20
Matches	73	11	1
Runs scored	3849	253	1
Batting average	31.80	25.30	1.00
100s/50s	4/18	–/2	–/–
Top score	212	65	1
Balls bowled	287	–	–
Wickets	2	–	–
Bowling average	97.00	–	–
5 wickets in innings	–	–	–
10 wickets in match	–	–	–
Best bowling	1/16	–	–
Catches/stumpings	67/–	3/–	–/–
- Source: Cricinfo, 30 March 2013

Neil Edwards (born 14 October 1983) is an English cricketer who played for Somerset &Nottinghamshire. He is a left-handed batsman and occasional right-arm medium pace bowler.

Edwards was born in Treliske near Truro, Cornwall. He scored 213 for Cornwall under-19s against Dorset when only 16 years old and played for Cornwall in the Minor Counties Championship in 2000. He toured Australia with the England under-19s in 2002–03 and represented England under-19s in 2003. He made his debut for the Somerset 2nd XI in 2001, his first-class debut for Somerset against West Indies 'A' in 2002 and his Championship debut in 2003. His maiden first-class century was 160 against Hampshire at Taunton in 2003.

He played regularly for Somerset in the second half of the 2006 season and ended that season with a career average of 31 in 24 first-class matches. In the first match of the 2007 season against Loughborough UCCE he scored 212 in 322 minutes.

In 2007–2008 he played in Australia for Melbourne club side Richmond CC

On 3 August 2009, he opted not to take up the offer of an extended contract at Somerset, and instead moved to Nottinghamshire for the 2010 season. He retired from 1st class cricket at the end of the 2012 season.

During 2012, he played club cricket for Plumtree CC in the Nottinghamshire Premier League.
