= Bert Lawrence (footballer) =

Australian rules footballer, born 1902

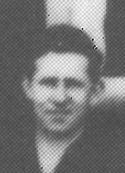

Personal information
- Full name: Robert Gribbon Lawrence
- Born: 7 January 1902; South Melbourne, Victoria
- Died: 1 August 1975 (aged 73); Adelaide, South Australia
- Original team: North United

Playing career^{1}
Years	Club	Games (Goals)
1921, 1925	South Melbourne	7 (8)
1926	Melbourne	3 (0)
Total		10 (8)
- ^{1} Playing statistics correct to the end of 1926.

Robert Gribbon Lawrence (7 January 1902 – 1 August 1975) was an Australian rules footballer who played for the South Melbourne Football Club and Melbourne Football Club in the Victorian Football League (VFL).

== Family ==
The son of William Henry Lawrence (1863-1943), and Alice Mary Lawrence (1861-1937), née Sutcliffe, Robert Gribbon Lawrence was born at South Melbourne, Victoria on 7 January 1902.

He married Lucy Evelyn Butlin on 24 March 1928. One of their children, Robert John Lawrence, was South Australia's Rhodes Scholar in 1953.

== Football ==
=== South Melbourne (VFL) ===
In May 1921 he was grant a permit from "Sydney to South Melbourne".

=== Melbourne (VFL) ===
He was cleared from South Melbourne to Melbourne on 28 April 1926.

=== South Gambier (SEFA) ===
He was cleared from Melbourne to "South Australia" on 20 April 1927, and on 25 April 1927 was elected captain of the South Gambier Football Club in the South Eastern Football Association. The team went on to win the 1927 Premiership. He played with the club for eight seasons: 1927 to 1934.

Transferred to Adelaide with his employment -- he had worked for eight years as a teller at the Mount Gambier Branch of the Commonwealth Bank -- he left the South Gambier club at the end of the 1934 season.
