= John Hurrell =

English cricketer (born 1947)

John Hurrell (born 1 September 1947) was an English cricketer. He was a left-handed batsman and right-arm medium-fast bowler who played for Cornwall. He was born in Redruth.

Hurrell made his only List A appearance for the side, during the 1970 season, against Glamorgan. From the lower order, he scored 10 runs.

Hurrell took figures of 1-30 from twelve overs of bowling.
