= Nicholas George =

English cricketer (born 1972)

Personal information
- Full name: Nicholas Thomas Peter George
- Born: 29 February 1972 (age 54); Penzance, Cornwall, England
- Batting: Left-handed
- Bowling: Right-arm medium
- Relatives: Mark George (brother)

Domestic team information
- Years: Team
- 1995-2006: Cornwall

Career statistics
Competition	LA
Matches	2
Runs scored	0
Batting average	0.00
100s/50s	–/–
Top score	0
Balls bowled	30
Wickets	1
Bowling average	49.00
5 wickets in innings	–
10 wickets in match	–
Best bowling	1/49
Catches/stumpings	–/–
- Source: Cricinfo, 17 October 2010

Nicholas Thomas Peter George (born 29 February 1972) is an English cricketer. George is a left-handed batsman who bowls right-arm medium pace. He was born at Penzance, Cornwall.

George made his Minor Counties Championship debut for Cornwall in 1995 against Wales Minor Counties. From 1995 to 2006, he represented the county in 31 Minor Counties Championship matches, the last of which came against Wiltshire. George also represented Cornwall in the MCCA Knockout Trophy. His debut in that competition came against Dorset in 1999. From 1999 to 2005, he represented the county in 10 Trophy matches, the last of which came against Wiltshire.

George has also represented Cornwall in 2 List A matches. These came both against Cheshire in the 1st round of the 2001 Cheltenham & Gloucester Trophy and in the 1st round of the 2002 Cheltenham & Gloucester Trophy which was played in 2001. In his 2 List A matches, he took a single wickets at a bowling average of 49.00, with best figures of 1/49.

== Family ==
His brother Mark also represented Cornwall in Minor Counties and List A cricket.
