= Danny Hall (cricketer) =

English cricketer (born 1944)

Danny Hall (born 3 November 1945) was an English cricketer. He was a right-handed batsman who played for Berkshire. He was born in Penzance.

Hall, who played regularly in the Minor Counties Championship between 1970 and 1977, and for one game in 1981, made his only List A appearance in 1976, against Hertfordshire. Hall scored a duck from the upper-middle order.

Hall received his Berkshire cap in 1973.
