= Gavin Edwards (cricketer) =

English cricketer

Personal information
- Full name: Gavin Derek Edwards
- Born: 14 April 1979 (age 47); Penzance, Cornwall, England
- Height: 5 ft 9 in (1.75 m)
- Batting: Right-handed
- Role: Wicketkeeper

Domestic team information
- Years: Team
- 1997-present: Cornwall

Career statistics
Competition	LA
Matches	7
Runs scored	134
Batting average	44.66
100s/50s	–/–
Top score	31*
Balls bowled	–
Wickets	–
Bowling average	–
5 wickets in innings	–
10 wickets in match	–
Best bowling	–
Catches/stumpings	5/2
- Source: Cricinfo, 17 October 2010

Gavin Derek Edwards (born 14 April 1979) is an English cricketer. Edwards is a right-handed batsman who plays primarily as a wicketkeeper. He was born at Penzance, Cornwall.

Edwards made his Minor Counties Championship debut for Cornwall in 1997 against Cheshire. From 1997 to 2009, he represented the county in 41 Minor Counties Championship matches, the last of which came against Wales Minor Counties. Edwards also represents Cornwall in the MCCA Knockout Trophy. His debut in that competition came against Devon in 2000. From 2000 to present, he has represented the county in 21 Trophy matches.

Edwards also represented Cornwall in List A cricket. His first List A match came against Norfolk in the 2000 NatWest Trophy. From 2000 to 2003, he represented the county in 7 List A matches, the last of which came against the Netherlands in the 1st round of the 2004 Cheltenham & Gloucester Trophy which was played in 2003. In his 7 List A matches, he scored 134 runs at a batting average of 44.66, with a high score of 31*. Behind the stumps he took 2 catches and made a single stumping.
