= Newquay Cricket Club =

Cricket club in Newquay, Cornwall, England

Newquay Cricket Club is an English cricket club based in Newquay, Cornwall, who play their home matches at Newquay Sports Centre. The club's first, second, third and fourth teams compete in the ECB Cornwall Cricket League.

Significant players with first-class experience who have played at Newquay include; Trevor Garwe (Mashonaland & Zimbabwe), Omesh Wijesiriwardana (Sri Lanka A), Dylan De Beer (Manicaland), Rory Coutts (Gauteng & Guernsey), Ryan Driver (Worcs and Lancs) & Timothy Walton (Essex & Northamptonshire).

As of 2021, Newquay CC 1st XI compete in the Cornwall Cricket League's County 1 Division.

== Honours ==
Honours for Newquay Cricket Club include:

- League Champions: 2003
- Hawkey Cup Winners: 2003, 2006, 2009
- Edwards Cup Winners: 2003
