= Michael Munday =

English cricketer

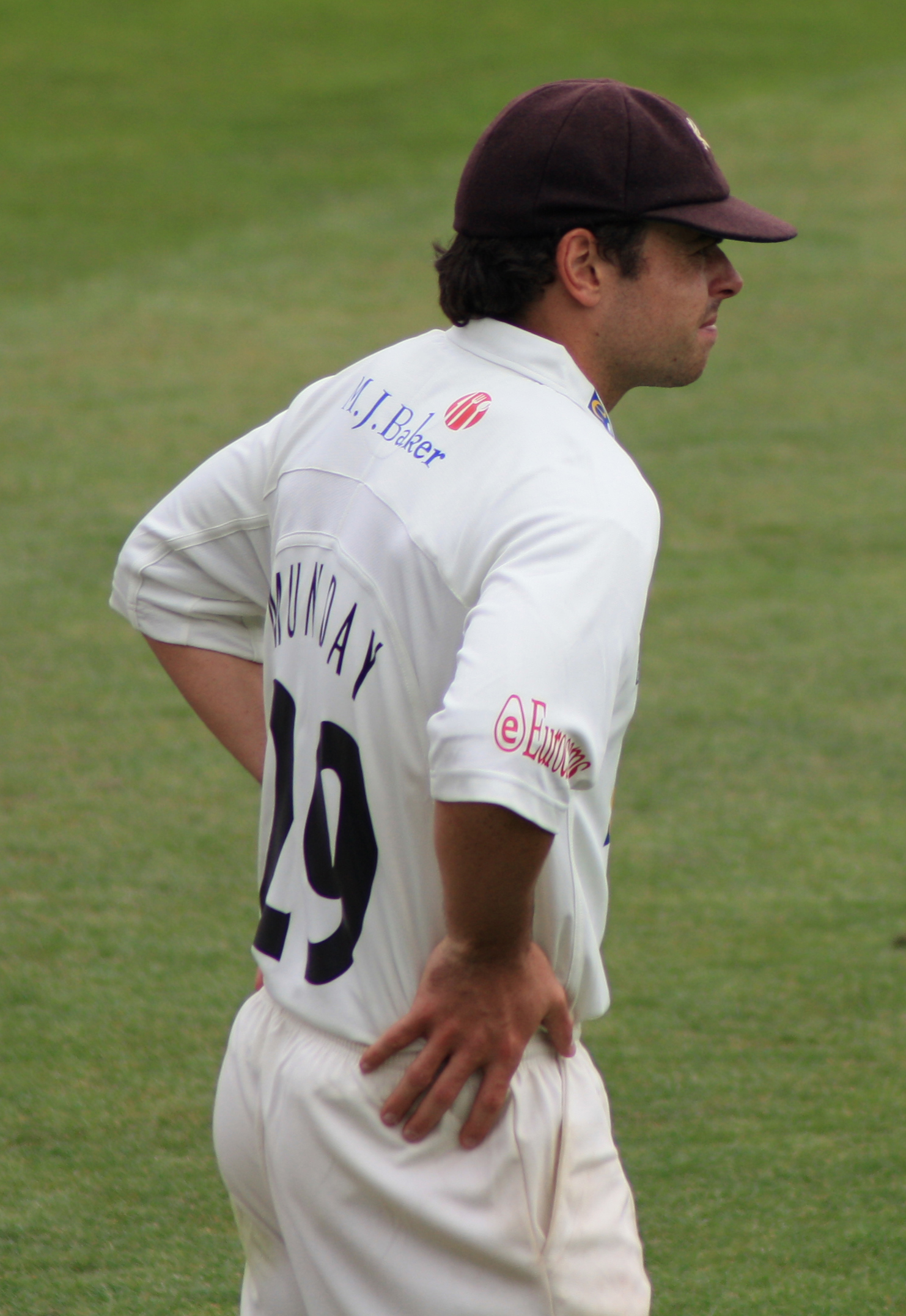

Personal information
- Full name: Michael Kenneth Munday
- Born: 22 October 1984 (age 42); Nottingham, England
- Height: 5 ft 8 in (1.73 m)
- Batting: Right-handed
- Bowling: Right-hand leg break
- Role: Bowler

Domestic team information
- Years: Team
- 2001: Cornwall
- 2003–2006: Oxford University
- 2005–2010: Somerset (squad no. 29)
- FC debut: 12 April 2003 OUCC v Middlesex
- Last FC: 10 May 2010 Somerset v Hampshire
- Only LA: 27 July 2001 Cornwall v Sussex

Career statistics
Competition	First-class	List A
Matches	31	1
Runs scored	107	–
Batting average	6.29	–
100s/50s	0/0	–
Top score	21	–
Balls bowled	3,795	30
Wickets	86	1
Bowling average	29.46	39.00
5 wickets in innings	4	0
10 wickets in match	2	0
Best bowling	8/55	1/39
Catches/stumpings	12/–	0/–
- Source: Cricinfo, 13 June 2010

Michael Kenneth Munday (born 22 October 1984) is an English former cricketer who played for Somerset from 2005 to 2010. He was a leg break bowler and lower order right-handed batsman.

Munday was born at Nottingham and made his Minor Counties debut for Cornwall while playing for Truro School in 2001 and played for them regularly in 2001 and 2002 before playing in the Somerset 2nd XI in late 2002. He played for Oxford University from 2003 to 2006 playing each season in the Varsity match against Cambridge University. His debut First-class match was for Oxford against Middlesex in which his first wickets were future England internationals, Andrew Strauss and Owais Shah.

In 2004, he played two Under-19 Test matches against Bangladesh alongside Somerset team-mate James Hildreth, under the captaincy of opener Alastair Cook. In the 2006 match against Cambridge, he took 11–143 and made his highest first-class innings of 17* enabling Oxford to win by 9 wickets. He made his first-class for Somerset debut in 2005 and also played for them in 2006 although he has yet to become a regular member of the team.

During the 2006 winter season, Munday played A-grade cricket for the Glenelg Cricket Club in Adelaide, Australia where he continued his tuition with leg-spin coach Terry Jenner. Munday's best first-class bowling occurred for Somerset against Nottinghamshire in September 2007 taking 8–55 from 16 overs in the second innings having never taken more than 3 wickets in a championship innings before. He finished with match figures of 10–65. Marcus Trescothick stated after this match that Munday "could be the x factor in helping us win the championship title next season".

In August 2010, Somerset's Director of Cricket, Brian Rose announced that Munday's contract would not be renewed for the 2011 season.
