= Cornwall Cricket League =

ECB Premier League

- Countries: Cornwall
- Administrator: Cornwall Cricket Board
- Format: Limited overs (50 per team)
- First edition: 2001; 25 years ago
- Tournament format: League
- Number of teams: 10
- Current champion: Penzance CC
- Most successful: St Just CC (8 titles)
- Website: Cornwall Cricket League

The Bond Timber Cornwall Cricket League Premier Division is the top level of competition for recreational club cricket in Cornwall, United Kingdom and is a designated an England and Wales Cricket Board (ECB) Premier League. St Just CC are the most successful club, having won the competition on eight occasions.

== History ==
From 1905 until 1989 there were two top divisions in Cornwall; Cornwall Senior League 1 East and Cornwall Senior League 1 West. The teams finishing in first place in the two divisions played for the Western Morning News Cup with the winner declared champions of Cornwall. The last winners of the Western Morning News Cup were St Gluvias who beat St Austell by 22 runs. In 1990 the top six clubs in the east and west leagues formed County League One with St Just winning the league despite only finishing 6th in the Western league the previous season. The irony of St Just winning the first title was that they were initially opposed to an all-Cornwall league because of the increased expenditure of travel for teams in the far west.

The English Cricket Board accredited Cornwall Cricket League Premier Division was formed in 2001, with a number of changes to the format of the matches. The league was reduced from twelve to ten with each teams playing the others on three occasions. Matches now consisted of a maximum of 120 overs with the team batting first having the option of using up to 60 overs, postponed matches did not have to be replayed, and winning and losing draws were once more allowed. It was also the first time that there was a Cornwall-wide administrative body; previously the east and west leagues had separate administrators. There were a number of advantages to participating in the ECB league structure which included financial assistance of £9,500 per year and encouragement to improve facilities and coaching.

Truro were champions in the first two seasons without losing a single match, having an unbeaten run of over fifty matches. Newquay followed their promotion the previous season by becoming champions of Cornwall for the first time in 2003. St Buryan had been the runners-up in the first three seasons but decided to withdraw from the league in November 2003, due to the belief that their team would not competitive, leading to the division being reduced to nine teams. In 2004 the clubs decided to share the 110 overs per match equally and St Just won the first of their six successive championships beating Truro, the second-placed team, on the final day of the season. St Just's run came to an end in 2010 when local rivals Paul won the championship for the first time (having been runner-up three seasons previous).

Draws were once again abolished before the 2016 season.

== Format ==
The ECB Cornwall Premier League consists of ten teams each playing the others on a home and away basis, to make a total of 18 matches each.

== Winners ==
County League One Champions 1990–2000
Year	Club
1990	St Just
1991	Falmouth
1992	Falmouth
1993	St Austell
1994	St Austell
1995	Troon
1996	Truro
1997	Truro
1998	St Just
1999	St Buryan
2000	St Buryan

Premier League Champions 2001–2020
Year	Club
2001	Truro
2002	Truro
2003	Newquay
2004	St Just
2005	St Just
2006	St Just
2007	St Just
2008	St Just
2009	St Just
2010	Paul
2011	Truro
2012	Werrington
2013	Werrington
2014	St Just
2015	Werrington
2016	St Just
2017	Truro
2018	Werrington
2019	Penzance
2020	no competition

Premier League Champions 2021–Present
Year	Club
2021	Penzance
2022	Penzance
2023	Wadebridge
2024	Penzance
2025	Penzance
2026	Penzance

== Premier Division performance by season from 2001 ==
Key
Gold	Champions
Blue	Left League
Red	Relegated

Performance by season, from 2001
Club	2001	2002	2003	2004	2005	2006	2007	2008	2009	2010	2011	2012	2013	2014	2015	2016	2017	2018	2019	2021	2022	2023	2024	2025	2026
Callington	4	6	7	8	8				8	4	4	3	3	10				10	9	9	8	9	2	7	4
Camborne	3	10			6	8						8	7	7	10			11		6	4	6	10		5
Falmouth	8	5	3	3	4	6	4	3	5	8	9	6	2	6	7	7	7	7	10						
Grampound Road	6	3	5	4	7	4	6	8		6	7	7	6	4	6	8	9	9	8	10				8	10
Hayle						7	8										8				7	10			
Helston	10				wd											4	10					8	9	3	6
Menheniot/Looe		7	9	7	wd																				
Mullion		8	10																						
Newquay			1	5	5	5	7	7	6	9	10			8	8	10									
Paul							2	5	7	1	3	9	8												
Penzance	9									10					9	3	3	2	1	1	1	2	1	1	1
Redruth													10	9	5	9	6	5	2	4	6	7	5	5	7
St Austell								6	4	5	6	5	9	5	4	5	5	4	5	5	5	3	4	4	8
St Buryan	2	2	2																						
St Just	5	4	6	1	1	1	1	1	1	2	5	2	4	1	3	1	2	6	4	3	2	5	8	9	9
Troon	7	9	8	9							8	10													
Truro	1	1	4	2	2	2	3	2	3	3	1	4	5	3	2	2	1	3	7	2	10		7	10	
Wadebridge																		8	6	7	3	1	3	2	2
Werrington				6	3	3	5	4	2	7	2	1	1	2	1	6	4	1	3	8	9	4	6	6	3
References																									
