= Charlie Shreck =

English cricketer (born 1978)

Personal information
- Full name: Charles Edward Shreck
- Born: 6 January 1978 (age 48); Truro, Cornwall, England
- Height: 6 ft 7 in (2.01 m)
- Batting: Right-handed
- Bowling: Right-arm fast-medium

Domestic team information
- Years: Team
- 1997–2002: Cornwall
- 2003–2011: Nottinghamshire
- 2005/06–2007/08: Wellington
- 2011–2013: Kent
- 2014–2017: Leicestershire

Career statistics
Competition	FC	LA	T20
Matches	175	60	29
Runs scored	801	47	20
Batting average	7.85	5.22	6.66
100s/50s	0/1	0/0	0/0
Top score	56	9*	10
Balls bowled	34,446	2,629	598
Wickets	577	73	30
Bowling average	31.80	31.01	26.30
5 wickets in innings	23	2	0
10 wickets in match	2	0	0
Best bowling	8/31	5/19	4/22
Catches/stumpings	49/–	15/–	6/–
- Source: Cricinfo, 24 April 2017

Charles Edward Shreck (born 6 January 1978) is an English former professional cricketer who has also played first-class cricket in New Zealand. He is a right-handed batsman and a right-arm fast-medium bowler.

In the 2008 English cricket season, Shreck bowled more overs than any other bowler in England and was among the leading wicket takers. For two years running he was voted Notts player of the season. In 2011 he signed with Kent. He retired from first class cricket in 2017.

== Early life ==
Shreck was educated at Polwhele House School and Truro School.

== Career ==
He played for Nottinghamshire 2003 to 2011, having previously played for Cornwall. Despite being unable to bowl Nottinghamshire out of relegation from the First Division in the 2003 season, and again being unable to garner a place during 2005 through injury when the team were once again at the top of the tree, Shreck nevertheless found a place during his year's exile from the English game in New Zealand, where he played three games for Wellington. Shreck rediscovered his niche as a tailend batsman but potent bowler in a Nottinghamshire side that failed to retain their position in the first division of the County Championship in 2006. During the 2006 season he was an effective wicket taker, including taking 8 wickets for 31 runs in the second innings against Middlesex. Shreck has continued to perform well in the 2007 season, including taking 7 wickets for 35 runs in a Nottinghamshire vs Derbyshire Division Two County Championship match.

During a June 2007 Twenty20 match Shreck was injured after bowling just one ball; it was driven fiercely back by Derbyshire's Michael Dighton, striking him on the shin. Shreck made his comeback in a Pro40 Division 1 game in which Nottinghamshire easily defeated struggling Gloucestershire by 116 runs. In 2007/08 he was back in New Zealand playing club cricket for Hutt District but mainly representing Wellington as an overseas player in first-class competitions.

Shreck had another sound season for Notts in 2008 bowling more overs than any other bowler in England and being among the leading wicket takers in the country. For the second year running he was voted Notts' player of the season. The 2009 season saw a return of injury problems however, resulting in operations to both his shoulder and knee during the winter. On Saturday, 12 June 2010, Shreck made his debut for North Staffordshire and South Cheshire League Division One side Sandyford, picking up figures of 5–43 in a 128-run win over Betley. He was released by Nottinghamshire toward the end of the 2011 season to allow him to sign a two-year deal with Kent.

At the end of the 2013 season, and despite being Kent's leading wicket taker in the County Championship, Shreck was told that he would not be offered a new contract. He subsequently joined Leicestershire for the 2014 season, where in 2015 he suffered the ignominy of six ducks in consecutive innings, equalling a world record last suffered in England by Victor Cannings in 1957 and 1958. Following an injury, Shreck retired from first class cricket in July 2017.
