= Cornwall County Cricket Club =

UK cricket team

Personnel
- Captain: Scott Harvey
- Coach: Godfrey Furse

Team information
- Founded: 1894; 131 years ago

History
- MCCC wins: 1 (2012)
- MCCAT wins: 1 (2015)
- FP Trophy wins: 0
- Official website: Cornwall County Cricket Club

Flag of Cornwall County Cricket Club

Cornwall County Cricket Club is one of twenty minor county clubs within the domestic cricket structure of England and Wales. It represents the historic county of Cornwall. The team has played in the Minor Counties Championship since 1904 and became champions in 2012. They also play in the MCCA Knockout Trophy. Cornwall played List A matches occasionally from 1970 until 2004 but is not classified as a List A team per se.

The club play home matches at various venues including Roskear in Camborne, Trescobeas in Falmouth, Boscawen Park in Truro and Wheal Eliza ground in St Austell.

== History ==
=== Earliest cricket in Cornwall ===
The first recorded mention of cricket in Cornwall is an advertisement in the Sherborne Mercury on 18 June 1781 for the sale of cattle at St Teath, near Camelford. The advertisement was dated 14 June 1781 and signed by Nathaniel Long and finished with a note, viz The evening of the same day will be circketed for a very handsome silver-laced hat.

According to Bowen (1970) a county organisation is known to have existed in 1813 and the first cricket club in Cornwall was known as the Cornish Cricket Club of Truro. The club moved to a new ground at Bosvigo, near Treyew, in 1844, and at about this time the name of the club was changed to Truro Cricket Club. A number of clubs were formed in the 1820s and for the first time regular inter-club matches took place, as well as the matches within towns such as Over Thirties v Under Thirties and Married v Singles. By the 1850s the large Cornish land-owning families, such as the Fortescue family of Boconnoc and the Agar-Robartes of Lanhydrock began to encourage the game, and between 1858 and 1870 many of the best English players toured Cornwall with teams such as the "All England Eleven", "North of England Eleven" and the "United Eleven of All England". In 1859 Cornwall lost to the Gentlemen of Devon and matches continued for a few years but were stopped following heavy Cornish defeats; Cornwall did beat Devon by an innings and 29 runs in 1887. Compared with other places, the lack of public schools seems to have held back the development of cricket, but by 1900 there were over one hundred and sixty clubs in Cornwall.

=== Origin and history of CCC ===
In 1890, Wiliam Bolitho attempted to form a county cricket club, which failed, as there were not enough subscribers to form a club.

The present Cornwall CCC was founded on 11 November 1894 at a meeting presided by Lord Robartes at the Talbot Hotel, Lostwithiel. Fifteen affiliated clubs and 114 subscribers contributed £151 6s 0d towards the new club. The first match was played against Devon on 22–23 July 1895 and they first competed in the Minor Counties Championship in 1904, appearing every year since with the exception of 1920. Cornwall won the Minor Counties Championship for the first time in their history in 2012, beating Buckinghamshire in the final. In 2015 Cornwall won the Unicorn Knockout Trophy beating Northumberland by 7 wickets at Sir Paul Getty's Ground, Wormsley, Buckinghamshire.

== Honours ==
- Minor Counties Championship (1) 2012
- Unicorns Knockout Trophy (1) 2015

=== Notable players ===
See List of Cornwall CCC players and Category:Cornwall cricketers

The following Cornwall cricketers have played in the first-class game:

- Jack Crapp
- Anthony Penberthy
- Ryan Driver
- Carl Gazzard
- Pasty Harris
- Robin Harvey
- Charlie Shreck
- Michael Munday
- Jack Richards
- Jake Libby
- Lewis Goldsworthy
- Liam Norwell
