= List of Somerset Cricket Board List A players =

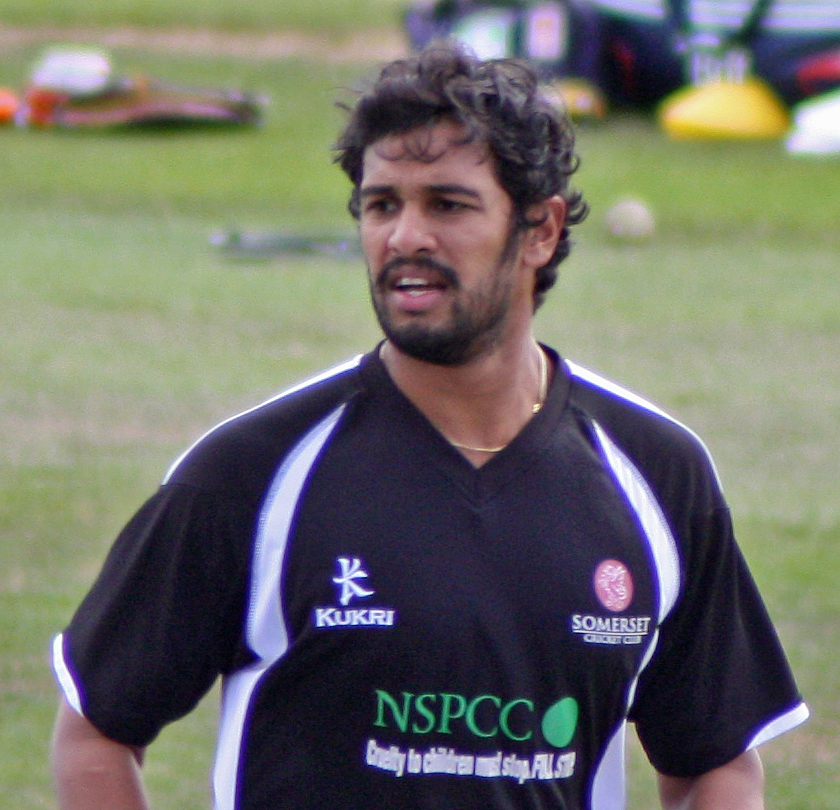
Arul Suppiah has the highest score and batting average for Somerset Cricket Board.

The Somerset Cricket Board (SCB) team competed in List A cricket from 1999 until 2002, taking part in the England and Wales Cricket Board's main knock-out trophy, known as the NatWest Trophy and then Cheltenham & Gloucester Trophy while the SCB played in it. Established as the Gillette Cup in 1963, the knock-out trophy expanded from 32 teams to 60 teams in 1999, featuring all of the minor counties, and the Cricket Board teams from the first-class counties. The Cricket Board teams were considered to be roughly equivalent talent to the minor counties, and they all entered in the first or second round, prior to the first-class counties who entered in the third round. The SCB did not win any of their List A matches, being eliminated in the round they entered in each of the five tournaments they took part in.

Only two players took part in all five of the SCB's List A matches; Kevin Parsons and Mathew Dimond. Parsons captained the SCB in all five matches, and was also the team's highest aggregate run-scorer, accumulating 125 runs for the team, while Dimond took more wickets for the SCB than any other player, claiming six during his matches for the team. Arul Suppiah, who only played for the team once, scored 70 runs in an innings against Cornwall in 2002, the team's highest score. Another player who only appeared once for the team, Matthew Bulbeck, has the best bowling figures for the team, after taking five wickets against Norfolk in 2001. That performance also gives him the best bowling average amongst SCB players, with 3.60. In all, 31 players have appeared for the SCB, of which ten have also made first-class cricket appearances.

Players are initially listed in order of appearance, where players made their debut in the same match, they are ordered by batting order.

== Key ==
All statistics apply only to matches played for Somerset Cricket Board

General

- ‡ – Captain
- † – Wicket-keeper
- ^{F} – Player has appeared in first-class cricket
- First – Year of debut
- Last – Year of latest match played
- Mat – Number of matches played

Batting

- Inn – Number of innings batted
- NO – Number of innings not out
- Runs – Runs scored
- HS – Highest score
- Avg – Runs scored per dismissal
- * – Batsman remained not out

Bowling

- Balls – Balls bowled
- Wkt – Wickets taken
- BBI – Best bowling in an innings
- Ave – Average runs per wicket
- Eco – Economy rate

Fielding

- Ca – Catches taken
- St – Stumpings effected

== List of players ==
No.	Name	Nationality	First	Last	Mat	Batting					Bowling					Fielding		Ref(s)
No.	Name	Nationality	First	Last	Mat	Inn	NO	Runs	HS	Avg	Balls	Wkt	BBI	Ave	Eco	Ca	St	Ref(s)
1	Kevin Blackburn	England	1999	2001	3	3	0	26	20	8.66	0	0	–	–	–	0	0	
2	Peter Trego ^{F}	England	1999	2001	2	2	0	11	11	5.50	96	4	2/21	15.75	3.93	0	0	
3	Gordon Swinney	England	1999	1999	1	1	0	5	5	5.00	48	0	–	–	3.50	1	0	
4	Kevin Parsons ‡†	England	1999	2002	5	5	1	125	65	31.25	0	0	–	–	–	2	0	
5	Gregg Brown	England	1999	1999	1	1	0	3	3	3.00	0	0	–	–	–	1	0	
6	Richard Trotman	England	1999	1999	1	1	0	2	2	2.00	48	2	2/30	15.00	3.75	0	0	
7	Kevin Sedgbeer	England	1999	2002	4	4	1	74	37	24.66	168	2	1/29	55.50	3.96	1	0	
8	Gary Bennett	England	1999	2000	2	2	0	6	5	3.00	30	0	–	–	6.80	0	0	
9	Steven Jenkins †	England	1999	2000	2	2	0	58	42	29.00	0	0	–	–	–	0	0	
10	Mathew Dimond ^{F}	England	1999	2002	5	4	1	35	13*	11.66	272	6	2/41	29.33	3.88	1	0	
11	Ben Wellington	England	1999	1999	1	1	1	5	5*	–	18	0	–	–	5.66	0	0	
12	Lee Cooper	England	2000	2000	1	1	0	17	17	17.00	0	0	–	–	–	0	0	
13	Michael Coles	England	2000	2002	4	3	0	55	29	18.33	36	0	–	–	6.16	1	0	
14	John Williams	England	2000	2000	1	1	0	10	10	10.00	0	0	–	–	–	0	0	
15	Wes Durston ^{F}	England	2000	2002	2	2	0	75	50	37.50	84	2	1/32	37.50	5.35	0	0	
16	Gareth Andrew ^{F}	England	2000	2001	2	1	0	1	1	1.00	53	0	–	–	3.96	1	0	
17	Chris Hunkin	England	2000	2001	2	2	1	10	10*	10.00	96	1	1/25	69.00	4.31	0	0	
18	Ian Jones ^{F}	England	2001	2001	1	1	0	6	6	6.00	60	2	2/33	16.50	3.30	1	0	
19	Tom Webley ^{F}	England	2001	2002	2	2	0	12	8	6.00	0	0	–	–	–	1	0	
20	Tim Burt †	England	2001	2001	1	1	0	2	2	2.00	0	0	–	–	–	2	1	
21	Richard Pannell	England	2001	2001	1	1	0	12	12	12.00	60	3	3/21	7.00	2.10	1	0	
22	Matthew Gitsham	England	2001	2001	2	1	0	15	15	15.00	0	0	–	–	–	0	0	
23	Brian Hoyle	England	2001	2001	1	1	0	11	11	11.00	0	0	–	–	–	1	0	
24	Matthew Bulbeck ^{F}	England	2001	2001	1	0	0	0	0	–	55	5	5/18	3.60	1.96	0	0	
25	Oliver Bailey	England	2001	2001	1	0	0	0	0	–	0	0	–	–	–	1	0	
26	Robert Travers	England	2001	2001	1	0	0	0	0	–	42	2	2/26	13.00	3.71	0	0	
27	Arul Suppiah ^{F}	England	2002	2002	1	1	0	70	70	70.00	60	0	–	–	3.60	2	0	
28	James Hildreth ^{F}	England	2002	2002	1	1	0	4	4	4.00	36	1	1/44	44.00	7.33	1	0	
29	Richard Timms	England	2002	2002	1	1	1	38	38*	–	0	0	–	–	–	0	0	
30	Alasdair Garnsworthy †	England	2002	2002	1	1	0	1	1	1.00	0	0	–	–	–	2	0	
31	Michael Parsons ^{F}	England	2002	2002	1	1	0	0	0	0.00	60	3	3/70	23.33	7.00	0	0	

== List A captains ==
No.	Name	First	Last	Mat	Won	Lost	Tied	Win%
1	Kevin Parsons	1999	2002	5	0	5	0	0%
Total		1999	2002	5	0	5	0	0.00%

== See also ==
- Somerset Cricket Board
