= Gary Bennett =

Gary or Garry Bennett may refer to:

- Gary Bennett (baseball) (born 1972), American Major League Baseball catcher
- Gary Bennett (cricketer) (born 1971), former English cricketer
- Gary Bennett (educator), professor of psychology at Duke University
- Gary Bennett (footballer, born 1961), English footballer, ex-Sunderland
- Gary Bennett (footballer, born 1963), English footballer, of Chester City and Wrexham
- Gary Bennett (footballer, born 1970), English footballer, ex-Colchester United
- Gary Bennett (politician), former mayor of Kingston, Ontario (1994–2000) and Progressive Conservative candidate in the 2018 Ontario general election
- Gary Bennett (referee), Australian rugby league referee
- Gary L. Bennett (born 1940), American scientist and science fiction writer
- Garry Knox Bennett (1934–2022), American woodworker, furniture maker and sculptor

== See also ==
- Gareth Bennett (disambiguation)
