= Tim Burt (cricketer) =

English cricketer

Personal information
- Full name: Michael Timothy Burt
- Born: 2 January 1972 (age 54); Bletchley, Buckinghamshire, England
- Batting: Right-handed
- Role: Wicketkeeper

Domestic team information
- Years: Team
- 2001: Somerset Cricket Board

Career statistics
Competition	LA
Matches	1
Runs scored	2
Batting average	2.00
100s/50s	–/–
Top score	2
Balls bowled	–
Wickets	–
Bowling average	–
5 wickets in innings	–
10 wickets in match	–
Best bowling	–
Catches/stumpings	2/1
- Source: Cricinfo, 19 October 2010

Michael Timothy Burt (born 2 January 1972) is an English cricketer. Burt is a right-handed batsman who plays primarily as a wicketkeeper. He was born in Bletchley, Buckinghamshire.

Burt represented the Somerset Cricket Board in a single List A match against Wales Minor Counties in the 1st round of the 2001 Cheltenham & Gloucester Trophy at North Perrott Cricket Club Ground. In his only List A match, he scored 2 runs and behind the stumps took 2 catches and made a single stumping.

Burt also represented Somerset County Cricket Club Second XI in their 2001 Season ECB Trophy campaign which saw them come runners up to Surrey County Cricket Club 2nd XI?

Burt had previously represented Northants Cricket Board, Northants Second XI and the Royal Navy Representative XI before going on to represent the Combined Services, a side which he captained in the 2010 season.
