= Michael Parsons (cricketer) =

English cricketer

Personal information
- Full name: Michael Parsons
- Born: 26 November 1984 (age 41); Taunton, Somerset, England
- Batting: Right-handed
- Bowling: Right-arm medium-fast

Domestic team information
- Years: Team
- 2002–2005: Somerset
- 2002: Somerset Cricket Board

Career statistics
Competition	FC	LA	T20
Matches	2	10	1
Runs scored	11	1	0
Batting average	5.50	0.25	0.00
100s/50s	0/0	0/0	0/0
Top score	6*	1*	0
Balls bowled	162	423	24
Wickets	0	8	0
Bowling average	–	54.00	–
5 wickets in innings	–	0	–
10 wickets in match	–	0	–
Best bowling	–	3/70	–
Catches/stumpings	0/–	3/–	0/–
- Source: CricketArchive (subscription required), 22 December 2015

Michael Parsons (born 26 November 1984) was an English cricketer. He was a right-handed batsman and a right-arm medium-fast bowler who played first-class cricket for Somerset. Parsons was born in Taunton.

Parsons began his career playing Second XI cricket in 2002, and made his most recent appearance in the competition in August 2006. In between he played occasional limited overs cricket, though he didn't get his debut first-class start until May 2005.

While Parsons made little contribution with the bat, his, and the rest of the team's, bowling against opponents Lancashire was expensive, as the match was played out to a draw.

Parsons would play County Cricket on one further occasion, against Derbyshire, where once again his performance was marked by his wild bowling and his inability, in the second innings, to attain a partnership long enough to secure the first of three consecutive scores of fifty or above for batting partner and namesake Keith Parsons.

Parsons attained one cap for the England Under-19 cricket team, representing the team in a defeat against South Africa Under-19s in August 2003. Since his exit from first-class cricket, Parsons has played one game for Minor Counties side Devon.

Career highlights: Playing against a strong New Zealand side in 2004 where Parsons produced an impressive bowling display to finish with figures of 6 for 30 off 10 overs.

In 2005 he was in the Somerset side that beat a very strong Australian team led by Ricky Ponting.
