= Lee Cooper (cricketer) =

English cricketer and cricket administrator

Personal information
- Full name: Lee Anthony Cooper
- Born: 1 September 1979 (age 47); Taunton, Somerset, England
- Batting: Right-handed
- Bowling: Right-arm off break

Domestic team information
- Years: Team
- 2000: Somerset Cricket Board
- Only List A: 2 May 2000 Somerset CB v Staffordshire

Career statistics
Competition	List A
Matches	1
Runs scored	17
Batting average	17.00
100s/50s	0/0
Top score	17
Catches/stumpings	0/–
- Source: ESPNcricinfo, 10 August 2017

Lee Anthony Cooper (born 1 September 1979) is an English former cricketer, and cricket administrator who was most recently chief executive of Somerset County Cricket Club.

Cooper was a right-handed batsman who bowls right-arm off break. He was born at Taunton, Somerset.

Cooper represented the Somerset Cricket Board in a single List A match against Staffordshire in the 1st round of the 2000 NatWest Trophy at the Gorway Ground, Walsall. In his only List A match, he scored 17 runs.

After failing to make the breakthrough into the Somerset first XI, Cooper founded Taunton-based mortgage advisors Cooper Associates. In June 2017, Cooper was announced as Guy Lavender's successor as chief executive of Somerset County Cricket Club. After only nine months Cooper resigned as chief executive of Somerset County Cricket Club.
