= Whitevine Meadows =

Protected area in Somerset, England

- Site of Special Scientific Interest
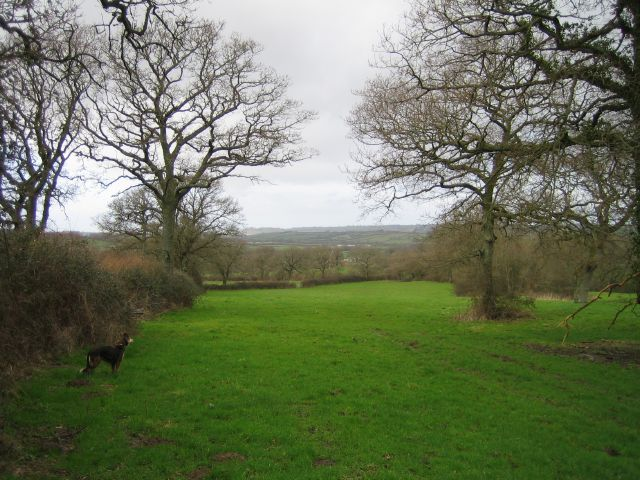

- Location within Somerset
- Location of Whitevine Meadows.
- Area of search: Somerset
- Grid reference: ST505085
- Coordinates: 50°52′30″N 2°42′23″W
- Interest: Biological
- Area: 13 hectares (0.13 km^{2}; 0.050 sq mi)
- Notification date: 1979

Whitevine Meadows (grid reference ST505085) is a 13.0 hectare (32.0 acre) biological Site of Special Scientific Interest east of North and South Perrott in Somerset, notified in 1979.

This site consists of a nationally rare type of neutral grassland together with adjoining areas of scrub and ancient woodland. The Whitevine meadow is unusual in being one of only three British localities where the grass Gaudinia fragilis is a prominent and established component of the sward. The scrub provides nest sites for several species of bird, including nightingale (Luscinia megarhynchos). Clearings within the scrub support a mixed flora with saw-wort (Serratula tinctoria), yellow-wort (Blackstonia perfoliata) and autumn gentian (Gentianella amarella). These sheltered glades provide favourable climatic conditions for butterflies including marbled white (Melanargia galathea) and silver-washed fritillary (Argynnis paphia).
