= Oliver Bailey =

English cricketer (born 1982)

Personal information
- Full name: Oliver James Bailey
- Born: 25 April 1982 (age 44); Plymouth, Devon, England
- Nickname: The Batting God
- Batting: Right-handed
- Bowling: Right-arm medium-fast

Domestic team information
- Years: Team
- 2001: Somerset Cricket Board

Career statistics
| Competition | LA |
|---|---|
| Matches | 1 |
| Runs scored | – |
| Batting average | – |
| 100s/50s | –/– |
| Top score | – |
| Balls bowled | – |
| Wickets | – |
| Bowling average | – |
| 5 wickets in innings | – |
| 10 wickets in match | – |
| Best bowling | – |
| Catches/stumpings | 1/– |
- Source: Cricinfo, 19 October 2010

Oliver James Bailey (born 25 April 1982) is an English cricketer. Bailey is a right-handed batsman who bowls right-arm medium-fast. He was born in Plymouth, Devon.

Bailey represented the Somerset Cricket Board in a single List A match against Norfolk in the 2nd round of the 2002 Cheltenham & Gloucester Trophy, which was held in 2001 at Manor Park, Horsford. In his only List A match, he wasn't required to bat or bowl, but he did take a single catch in the field.
