= Pannill =

Pannill is a surname. Notable people with the surname include:

- Lizzie Fletcher (née Pannill, born 1975), American attorney and politician
- William Pannill (1927–2014), American businessman and botanist

== See also ==
- Pannell
