= Brian Hoyle =

English cricketer

Personal information
- Full name: Brian James Hoyle
- Born: 25 August 1963 (age 63); Worksop, Nottinghamshire, England
- Batting: Left-handed

Domestic team information
- Years: Team
- 2001: Somerset Cricket Board
- 1995 & 1997: Herefordshire

Career statistics
Competition	LA
Matches	1
Runs scored	11
Batting average	11.00
100s/50s	–/–
Top score	11
Balls bowled	–
Wickets	–
Bowling average	–
5 wickets in innings	–
10 wickets in match	–
Best bowling	–
Catches/stumpings	1/–
- Source: Cricinfo, 19 October 2010

Brian James Hoyle (born 25 August 1963) is an English cricketer. Hoyle is a left-handed batsman. He was born at Worksop, Nottinghamshire.

Hoyle made his debut for Herefordshire in the Minor Counties Championship against Shropshire in 1995. He played 2 further Championship matches for the county, against Cornwall in 1995 and against the same opposition in 1997.

Hoyle represented the Somerset Cricket Board in a single List A match against Norfolk in the 2nd round of the 2002 Cheltenham & Gloucester Trophy, which was held in 2001 at Manor Park, Horsford. In his only List A match, he scored 11 runs and took a single catch in the field.

He currently plays club cricket for Taunton St Andrews Cricket Club in the West of England Premier League.
