= Ian Jones (cricketer) =

English cricketer (born 1977)

Ian Jones (born 11 March 1977) played first-class and List A cricket for Somerset in the 1999 season and for Middlesex in the 2002 season. In between these appearances, he also played List A cricket for the Somerset Cricket Board in 2001. He was born at Edmonton, Middlesex.
