= Alasdair Garnsworthy =

English cricketer

Personal information
- Full name: Alasdair George Garnsworthy
- Born: 30 December 1983 (age 42); Marlborough, Wiltshire, England
- Batting: Right-handed
- Role: Wicketkeeper

Domestic team information
- Years: Team
- 2002: Somerset Cricket Board

Career statistics
Competition	LA
Matches	1
Runs scored	1
Batting average	1.00
100s/50s	–/-
Top score	1
Balls bowled	–
Wickets	–
Bowling average	–
5 wickets in innings	–
10 wickets in match	–
Best bowling	–
Catches/stumpings	2/-
- Source: Cricinfo, 2 June 2010

Alasdair George Garnsworthy (born 30 December 1983) is a former English cricketer. Garnsworthy was a right-handed batsman who played primarily as a wicketkeeper.

Garnsworthy made a single List-A appearance for the Somerset Cricket Board against Cornwall in the 1st round of the 2003 Cheltenham & Gloucester Trophy which was played in 2002. In the match he scored a single run before being dismissed by Justin Stephens and behind the stumps he took 2 catches.
