= Gordon Swinney =

English cricketer

Personal information
- Full name: Gordon Robert Swinney
- Born: 4 January 1974 (age 52); Bath, Somerset, England
- Height: 1.78 m (5 ft 10 in)
- Batting: Right-handed
- Bowling: Right-arm off break

Domestic team information
- Years: Team
- 1999: Somerset Cricket Board

Career statistics
Competition	LA
Matches	1
Runs scored	5
Batting average	5.00
100s/50s	–/–
Top score	5
Balls bowled	48
Wickets	–
Bowling average	–
5 wickets in innings	–
10 wickets in match	–
Best bowling	–
Catches/stumpings	1/–
- Source: Cricinfo, 20 October 2010

Gordon Robert Swinney (born 4 January 1974) is a former English cricketer. Swinney was a right-handed batsman who bowled right-arm off break. He was born at Bath, Somerset.

Swinney first played county cricket for Wiltshire during the 1995 season. He played 2 Minor Counties Championship matches for the county against Wales Minor Counties and Herefordshire. He also represented the county in a single MCCA Knockout Trophy match against Cambridgeshire.

Swinney later represented the Somerset Cricket Board in a single List A match against Bedfordshire in the 2nd round of the 1999 NatWest Trophy. In his only List A match, he scored 59 runs and took a single catch.
