= Kevin Blackburn =

English cricketer (born 1968)

Personal information
- Full name: Kevin Richard Blackburn
- Born: 19 August 1968 (age 58); Doncaster, Yorkshire, England
- Batting: Right-handed
- Bowling: Right-arm medium

Domestic team information
- Years: Team
- 2002-2005: Wiltshire
- 1999-2001: Somerset Cricket Board
- 1987 & 1991-1994: Cornwall

Career statistics
Competition	LA
Matches	3
Runs scored	26
Batting average	8.66
100s/50s	–/–
Top score	20
Balls bowled	–
Wickets	–
Bowling average	–
5 wickets in innings	–
10 wickets in match	–
Best bowling	–
Catches/stumpings	–/–
- Source: Cricinfo, 20 October 2010

Kevin Richard Blackburn, more commonly known as Blackers, (born 19 August 1968) is a former English cricketer. Blackburn was a right-handed batsman who bowled right-arm medium pace.

== Cricket career ==
He represented Nottinghamshire CCC 2nd XI in 1987 and 1988, Somerset CCC 2nd XI and U25s in 1987 and Gloucestershire CCC 2nd XI and U25s in 1985. In 1987 he represented British Polytechnics and in 1991 represented English Universities.

Blackburn first played county cricket for Cornwall in the 1987 Minor Counties Championship against Shropshire. From 1987 to 1994, he represented the county in 13 Minor Counties Championship matches, the last of which came against Herefordshire. He also represented Cornwall in the MCCA Knockout Trophy. His debut in that competition came against Devon in 1992. He represented Cornwall in 2 further Trophy matches against Wiltshire in 1993 and Dorset in 1994.

Blackburn later represented the Somerset Cricket Board for 3 seasons in 2 day cricket and played in 3 List A matches. These came against Bedfordshire in the 1999 NatWest Trophy, Staffordshire in the 2000 NatWest Trophy and Wales Minor Counties in the 2001 Cheltenham & Gloucester Trophy. In his 3 List A matches, he scored 26 runs at a batting average of 8.66, with a high score of 20.

In 2002, he joined Wiltshire. He made his debut for Wiltshire in the Minor Counties Championship against Dorset. From 2002 to 2005, he represented the county in 11 Championship matches, the last of which came against Devon. He also represented the county in the MCCA Knockout Trophy, representing them in 8 Trophy matches, the last of which came against Norfolk in 2005.

In club cricket he played for Bristol CC (formerly Optimists CC) in the Western League (WEPL) from 1992 to 2008, winning the National Club Championship in 1992 and Western League in 1996.

== After cricket ==
He was born at Doncaster, Yorkshire. He is a PE teacher at Bristol Grammar School where he runs the boys hockey and cricket.
