= North Perrott =

Village in Somerset, England

Coordinates: 50.8825°N 2.7476°W

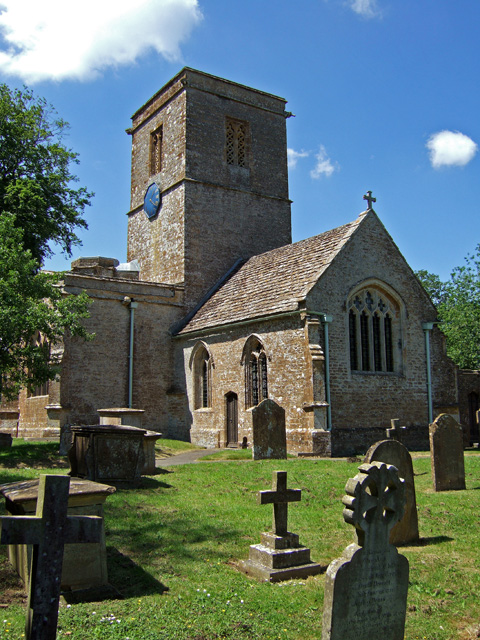
- Church of St Martin, North Perrott

- Location within Somerset
- Population: 246 (2011)
- OS grid reference: ST475095
- Civil parish: North Perrott
- Unitary authority: Somerset Council
- Ceremonial county: Somerset
- Region: South West
- Country: England
- Sovereign state: United Kingdom
- Post town: CREWKERNE
- Postcode district: TA18
- Dialling code: 01460
- Police: Avon and Somerset
- Fire: Devon and Somerset
- Ambulance: South Western
- UK Parliament: Yeovil
- Website: North Perrott Parish Council

North Perrott is a village and civil parish in south Somerset, England, near the border with Dorset.

== History ==
The name Perrott comes from the River Parrett.

There is evidence of Roman and Iron Age settlement in the village.

The manor was held with South Perrott just over the border in Dorset.

The parish was part of the hundred of Houndsborough.

800 metres (2,600 ft) north north-west of Pipplepen Farmhouse are earthworks of an 80 metres (260 ft) by 75 metres (246 ft) platform with the remains of buildings. The site with its surrounding moat is believed to be the medieval mansion home of the De Pipplepens.

== Governance ==
The parish council has responsibility for local issues, including setting an annual precept (local rate) to cover the council's operating costs and producing annual accounts for public scrutiny. The parish council evaluates local planning applications and works with the local police, district council officers, and neighbourhood watch groups on matters of crime, security, and traffic. The parish council's role also includes initiating projects for the maintenance and repair of parish facilities, as well as consulting with the district council on the maintenance, repair, and improvement of highways, drainage, footpaths, public transport, and street cleaning. Conservation matters (including trees and listed buildings) and environmental issues are also the responsibility of the council.

For local government purposes, the village falls within the Somerset Council unitary authority area, which was created on 1 April 2023. From 1894 to 31 March 1974, the village was part of Yeovil Rural District, and from 1 April 1974 to 31 March 2023, it fell within the non-metropolitan district of South Somerset.

North Perrott is part of the electoral ward of Parrett, which had a population of 2,336 at the 2011 Census. The ward itself falls within the county constituency of Yeovil, which has been represented in the House of Commons of the Parliament of the United Kingdom by Marcus Fysh of the Conservative Party since 2015.

== Geography ==
To the east of the village is Whitevine Meadows, a biological Site of Special Scientific Interest which consists of a nationally rare type of neutral grassland together with adjoining areas of scrub and ancient woodland. The Whitevine meadow is unusual in being one of only three British localities where the grass Gaudinia fragilis is a prominent and established component of the sward. The scrub provides nest sites for several species of bird, including nightingale (Luscinia megarhynchos). Clearings within the scrub support a mixed flora with saw-wort (Serratula tinctoria), yellow-wort (Blackstonia perfoliata) and autumn gentian (Gentianella amarella). These sheltered glades provide favourable climatic conditions for butterflies including the marbled white (Melanargia galathea) and the silver-washed fritillary (Argynnis paphia).

== Landmarks ==
North Perrott Manor House was built in 1877 by Thomas Henry Wyatt for P.M. Hoskyns. After World War II it became Perrott Hill School and, along with the ornaments, stables and other outbuildings, has been designated as a listed building.

== Religious sites ==
The Church of St Martin dates from the 12th century and has been designated by English Heritage as a Grade I listed building.

== Sport ==
North Perrott Cricket Club Ground is a former List A cricket ground. It hosted a single Cheltenham & Gloucester Trophy match in 2001 between Somerset Cricket Board and Wales Minor Counties. The ground has also been used by Somerset County Cricket Club and Board for numerous other matches. It has also hosted the Somerset women's cricket team occasionally since 2005. The ground is home to North Perrott Cricket Club, and has been since its creation in 1946.

== Notable people ==
The writer Elizabeth Ham was born in North Perrott in 1783.
