= Matthew Gitsham =

English cricketer (born 1982)

Personal information
- Full name: Matthew Thomas Gitsham
- Born: 1 February 1982 (age 44); Truro, Cornwall, England
- Batting: Right-handed
- Bowling: Right arm leg break

Domestic team information
- Years: Team
- 2008: Gloucestershire
- 2006–2009: Buckinghamshire
- 2001: Somerset Cricket Board

Career statistics
| Competition | First-class | List A |
|---|---|---|
| Matches | 4 | 2 |
| Runs scored | 58 | 15 |
| Batting average | 14.50 | 15.00 |
| 100s/50s | –/– | –/– |
| Top score | 35* | 15 |
| Balls bowled | 573 | – |
| Wickets | 3 | – |
| Bowling average | 90.33 | – |
| 5 wickets in innings | – | – |
| 10 wickets in match | – | – |
| Best bowling | 1/12 | – |
| Catches/stumpings | 1/– | –/– |
- Source: CricketArchive, 27 July 2008

Matthew Thomas Gitsham (born 1 February 1982) is an English cricketer. Primarily a leg break bowler, he has played for Gloucestershire County Cricket Club having previously represented Somerset Cricket Board in 2001 and Buckinghamshire in Minor counties cricket in 2006.

After playing for the Somerset Cricket Board in the Cheltenham & Gloucester Trophy in 2001 and 2002, Gitsham had to wait six years for a first-class debut with Gloucestershire. He played in an early season friendly match against Loughborough UCCE bowling seven wicketless overs in the first innings and scoring an unbeaten 192 in Gloucestershire's second innings to help his side secure a two-wicket win.

He went on to play three matches in the LV County Championship Division Two later in the season, dismissing Glamorgan's Simon Jones for his first wicket. He was released by Gloucestershire at the end of the 2009 season along with Grant Hodnett.

He has also played for overseas teams Wanneroo DC, in Perth, and Sturt Hill, Adelaide, in Australia.
