= Richard Pannell =

English cricketer

Personal information
- Full name: Richard James Pannell
- Born: 2 June 1973 (age 53); Bristol, England
- Batting: Right-handed
- Bowling: Right-arm medium

Domestic team information
- Years: Team
- 2001: Somerset Cricket Board

Career statistics
Competition	LA
Matches	1
Runs scored	12
Batting average	12.00
100s/50s	–/–
Top score	12
Balls bowled	60
Wickets	3
Bowling average	7.00
5 wickets in innings	–
10 wickets in match	–
Best bowling	3/21
Catches/stumpings	1/–
- Source: Cricinfo, 19 October 2010

Richard James Pannell (born 2 June 1973) is a former English cricketer. Pannell was a right-handed batsman who bowled right-arm medium pace. He was born at Bristol.

Pannell represented the Somerset Cricket Board in a single List A match against Wales Minor Counties in the 1st round of the 2001 Cheltenham & Gloucester Trophy at North Perrott Cricket Club Ground. In his only List A match, he scored 12 runs and took a single catch in the field. With the ball he took 3 wickets at a bowling average of 7.00, with figures of 3/21.
