= Pannell =

Pannell is a surname. Notable people with the surname include:

- Charles A. Pannell Jr. (born 1946), United States federal judge
- Charles Pannell (1902–1980), British Labour Party politician
- Ernie Pannell (1917–1998), American football player
- Florence Pannell (1868–1980), British businesswoman and supercentenarian
- Glen Pannell (born 1965), impersonator of Mike Pence, the 48th Vice President of the United States
- James Madison Pannell (1883–1930), American teacher and Democratic politician
- Joseph Pannell Taylor (1796–1864), Union general in the American Civil War
- Nita Pannell (1904–1994), Australian teacher, actress and theatre director
- Norman Pannell (1901–1976), British finance manager and Conservative politician
- Phillip Pannell, African American teenager killed by a police officer in New Jersey in 1990
- Richard Pannell (born 1973), British cricketer
- Rob Pannell (born 1989), American lacrosse player
- Tom Pannell (1933–2003), British textile designer and academic
- Troy Pannell, Australian rules football field umpire in the Australian Football League
- William Pannell (1929–2024), American theologian and academic
