= Feltonfleet School =

Location
- Byfleet Road; Cobham, Surrey; England; 51°20′05″N 0°25′54″W

Information
- Type: Independent Preparatory school
- Motto: Where individuals really matter
- Religious affiliation: Church of England
- Established: 1903
- Headmistress: Shelley Lance
- Gender: Boys and Girls
- Age: 3 to 13
- Enrolment: 400 Approx.
- Website: www.feltonfleet.co.uk

Feltonfleet School is a preparatory school for boys and girls from 3 to 13 years old, based in Cobham, Surrey in a Grade II listed building. The school is a charitable trust. It was founded in 1903 and started accepting girls in 1994.

During World War II the school was evacuated to North Perrott Manor House.
