= Gareth Bennett =

Gareth Bennett may refer to:

- Gareth Bennett (priest) (1929–1987), British Anglican priest and academic
- Gareth Bennett (politician) (born 1968), Welsh politician

== See also ==
- Gary Bennett (disambiguation)
