= Tom Webley =

English cricketer

Personal information
- Full name: Thomas Webley
- Born: 2 March 1983 (age 43); Bristol, England
- Batting: Left-handed
- Bowling: Slow left-arm orthodox

Domestic team information
- Years: Team
- 2001–2002: Somerset Cricket Board
- 2003–2005: Cambridge UCCE
- 2003: Somerset
- 2005: Suffolk
- 2006–2007: Dorset

Career statistics
Competition	First-class	List A
Matches	15	2
Runs scored	833	12
Batting average	34.70	6.00
100s/50s	1/5	0/0
Top score	104	8
Balls bowled	510	–
Wickets	6	–
Bowling average	59.50	–
5 wickets in innings	0	–
10 wickets in match	0	–
Best bowling	2/57	–
Catches/stumpings	7/–	1/–
- Source: Cricinfo, 5 February 2011

Thomas Webley (born 2 March 1983) is an English cricketer. Webley is a left-handed batsman who bowls slow left-arm orthodox.

Born in Bristol before moving to the village of Corfe Mullen in Dorset, Webley had been educated at King's College, a boarding school in Taunton, Somerset. In 1999 he first appeared for the Somerset Second XI in the Second Eleven Championship. In 2001, Webley was selected to represent the Somerset Cricket Board in the 2001 Cheltenham & Gloucester Trophy and as a result he made his debut in List A cricket against Wales Minor Counties, following this up the next season with his second List A appearance, which was to be the last of his career, against Cornwall in the 1st round of the 2003 Cheltenham & Gloucester Trophy which was held in 2002.

Taking up education at Anglia University, given its proximity to Cambridge resulted in Webley appearing for Cambridge University Centre of Cricketing Excellence, for which he made his debut in first-class cricket in 2003 against Essex. Two matches later he scored a maiden century against Northamptonshire, making a cautious 104 before being dismissed by Monty Panesar. Following encouraging performances with the Cambridge University team and in the Somerset Second XI, which received praise from then Second XI coach Mark Garaway. As a result, he made his debut for first XI in that seasons County Championship against Durham at the Riverside Ground. In a fairly unsuccessful debut, he was dismissed for 6 in Somerset's first-innings by Vince Wells and for a duck in their second by Shoaib Akhtar.

Webley played five further first-class matches for Somerset in 2003, the last of which came against Derbyshire. He did not though make any appearances in List A or Twenty20 format for the county. The following season he continued to represent Cambridge University and did so until the 2005 season when he played his final first-class match against Middlesex. A fairly reliable batsman at first-class level, Webley scored 833 runs in 15 first-class matches, averaging 34.70, making five half centuries and just the single century. With the ball in hand, he took 6 wickets at a bowling average of 59.50, with best figures of 2/57.

His association with Somerset ended in 2004 and in 2005 he represented the Leicestershire Second XI. Webley proceeded to play Minor counties cricket for Suffolk in 2005, before facilitating a move back south where he represented Dorset in Minor counties cricket from 2006 to 2007.

During the summer of 2007, he took up the role as a Teacher at Kimbolton School, and is Master in Charge of Cricket. In 2013, Tom made the move to Merchant Taylors' School and was Director of Cricket there. Currently he is Director of Sport at Wells Cathedral School in Somerset and has held the position since September 2018.

He is an ECB Level 4 Master Coach and has completed a master's degree (MSc) in Elite Coaching.
