= Kevin Sedgbeer =

English cricketer

Personal information
- Full name: Kevin Graham Sedgbeer
- Born: 20 September 1972 (age 54); Taunton, Somerset, England
- Batting: Right-handed
- Bowling: Slow left-arm orthodox

Domestic team information
- Years: Team
- 2000: Huntingdonshire
- 1999–2002: Somerset Cricket Board

Career statistics
| Competition | LA |
|---|---|
| Matches | 6 |
| Runs scored | 103 |
| Batting average | 20.60 |
| 100s/50s | –/- |
| Top score | 37 |
| Balls bowled | 186 |
| Wickets | 2 |
| Bowling average | 64.50 |
| 5 wickets in innings | – |
| 10 wickets in match | – |
| Best bowling | 1/29 |
| Catches/stumpings | 4/- |
- Source: Cricinfo, 2 June 2010

Kevin Graham Sedgbeer (born 20 September 1972) is a former English cricketer. Sedgbeer was a right-handed batsman who bowled slow left-arm orthodox spin.

Sedgbeer made his List-A debut for the Somerset Cricket Board in the 1999 NatWest Trophy against Bedfordshire.

In 2000 he played 2 List-A matches for Huntingdonshire in the 2000 NatWest Trophy against the Hampshire Cricket Board and the Yorkshire Cricket Board.

In 2001 he once again played for the Somerset Cricket Board against Wales Minor Counties in the 2001 Cheltenham & Gloucester Trophy and later that year he played for the Board in the 2nd round of the 2002 Cheltenham & Gloucester Trophy against Norfolk which was played in September 2001. His final List-A match for the Board came against Cornwall in the 1st round of the 2003 Cheltenham & Gloucester Trophy.

In his 6 one-day matches, he scored 103 runs at a batting average of 20.60. With the ball he took 2 wickets at a bowling average of 64.50, with best figures of 1/29.
