= Michael Coles (cricketer) =

English cricketer (born 1981)

Personal information
- Full name: Michael Stuart Coles
- Born: 11 September 1981 (age 45); Bristol, England
- Batting: Right-handed
- Bowling: Right arm medium
- Role: Wiltshire captain

Domestic team information
- Years: Team
- 2003-present: Wiltshire
- 2000–2002: Somerset Cricket Board

Career statistics
Competition	LA
Matches	6
Runs scored	99
Batting average	19.80
100s/50s	–/–
Top score	32
Balls bowled	138
Wickets	3
Bowling average	30.00
5 wickets in innings	–
10 wickets in match	–
Best bowling	2/34
Catches/stumpings	1/–
- Source: Cricinfo, 10 October 2010

Michael Stuart Coles (born 11 September 1981) is an English cricketer. Coles is a right-handed batsman who bowls right-arm medium. He was born in Bristol.

Coles made his debut in List-A cricket for the Somerset Cricket Board in the 2000 NatWest Trophy against Staffordshire. He represented the Board in 4 List-A matches between 2000 and 2002, the last of which came against Cornwall in the 1st round of the 2003 Cheltenham & Gloucester Trophy which was played in 2002.

Coles made his Minor Counties Championship debut for Wiltshire in 2003 against Wales Minor Counties. From 2003 to present, he has represented the county in 35 Minor Counties Championship matches. Coles also represented Wiltshire in the MCCA Knockout Trophy making his debut for the county in that competition against Dorset in 2004. From 2004 to present, he has represented the county in 26 Trophy matches. Coles is the current Wiltshire captain.

Coles also represented Wiltshire in List-A cricket. His List-A debut for the county came against Nottinghamshire in the 2004 Cheltenham & Gloucester Trophy. He represented Wiltshire in one further List-A match against Kent in the 2005 Cheltenham & Gloucester Trophy. This marks his final List-A appearance to date. In his combined List-A matches, he scored 99 runs at a batting average of 19.80, with a high score of 32. With the ball he took 3 wickets at a bowling average of 30.00.
