= Gregg Brown =

English cricketer

Personal information
- Full name: Gregg Brown
- Born: 20 December 1972 (age 53); Bath, Somerset, England
- Batting: Right-handed
- Bowling: Right-arm medium

Domestic team information
- Years: Team
- 1999: Somerset Cricket Board

Career statistics
Competition	LA
Matches	1
Runs scored	3
Batting average	3.00
100s/50s	–/–
Top score	3
Balls bowled	–
Wickets	–
Bowling average	–
5 wickets in innings	–
10 wickets in match	–
Best bowling	–
Catches/stumpings	1/–
- Source: Cricinfo, 20 October 2010

Gregg Brown (born 20 December 1972) is an English cricketer. Brown is a right-handed batsman who bowls right-arm medium pace. He was born at Bath, Somerset.

Brown represented the Somerset Cricket Board in a single List A match against Bedfordshire in the 2nd round of the 1999 NatWest Trophy. In his only List A match, he scored 3 runs

and took a single catch.
