= Richard Trotman =

English cricketer

Personal information
- Full name: Richard Ian Trotman
- Born: 8 January 1972 (age 54); Keynsham, Somerset, England
- Batting: Right-handed
- Bowling: Right-arm medium

Domestic team information
- Years: Team
- 1999: Somerset Cricket Board

Career statistics
Competition	LA
Matches	1
Runs scored	2
Batting average	2.00
100s/50s	–/–
Top score	2
Balls bowled	48
Wickets	2
Bowling average	15.00
5 wickets in innings	–
10 wickets in match	–
Best bowling	2/30
Catches/stumpings	–/–
- Source: Cricinfo, 20 October 2010

Richard Ian Trotman (born 8 January 1972) is a former English cricketer. Trotman was a right-handed batsman who bowled right-arm medium pace. He was born at Keynsham, Somerset.

Trotman represented the Somerset Cricket Board in a single List A match against Bedfordshire in the 2nd round of the 1999 NatWest Trophy. In his only List A match, he scored 2 runs and took 2 wickets at a bowling average of 15.00, with figures of 2/30 in the match.
