= Gorway Ground =

Cricket ground in Walsall, Staffordshire, England

Ground information
- Location: Gorway Road, Walsall, England
- Coordinates: 52°34′23″N 1°58′15″W
- Establishment: 1889 (first recorded match)

Team information
Staffordshire	(1912-1914, 1920-1923, 1934, 1938, 1951-1952, 1962-1964, 1974-1984 & 1991-2007)
Minor Counties	(1986 & 1997)
- As of 14 August 2010; Source: Ground profile

Gorway Ground is a cricket ground in Walsall, Staffordshire. The first recorded match on the ground was in 1889, when Walsall Cricket Club played Wednesbury. The first Minor Counties Championship match was held at the ground in 1912 and saw Staffordshire played Durham. Staffordshire used the ground during a number of periods in the 20th century, using the ground for home matches up to 2007. During this time, the ground hosted 27 Minor Counties Championship matches and 5 MCCA Knockout Trophy matches.

A combined Minor Counties team has used the ground for 2 List-A matches, the first of which came in the 1986 Benson and Hedges Cup against Warwickshire and the second of which came in the 1997 version of the competition against Lancashire. Staffordshire have used the ground for a single List-A match, which came against the Somerset Cricket Board in the 2000 NatWest Trophy, which is the last List-A match held on the ground to date.

In local domestic cricket, Gorway Ground is the home ground of Walsall Cricket Club who play in the Birmingham and District Premier League.
