= Kevin Parsons (cricketer) =

English cricketer (born 1973)

Personal information
- Full name: Kevin John Parsons
- Born: 2 May 1973 (age 53); Taunton, Somerset, England
- Batting: Right-handed
- Role: Occasional wicket-keeper
- Relatives: Keith Parsons (twin brother)

Domestic team information
- Years: Team
- 1992–1993: Somerset
- LA debut: 13 July 1992 Somerset v Transvaal
- Last LA: 29 August 2002 Somerset Cricket Board v Cornwall

Career statistics
Competition	LA
Matches	8
Runs scored	161
Batting average	26.83
100s/50s	0/1
Top score	65
Catches/stumpings	2/0
- Source: CricketArchive, 8 January 2011

Kevin John Parsons (born 2 May 1973) is a former English cricketer who played one-day cricket for Somerset County Cricket Club between 1992 and 2002. He appeared three times for Somerset in List A cricket, and five times for Somerset Cricket Board, for whom he scored his highest total, hitting 65 as captain against Bedfordshire in 1999. His twin brother, Keith Parsons also played for Somerset.
