= Church of St Martin, North Perrott =

Church in Somerset, England

Church of St Martin
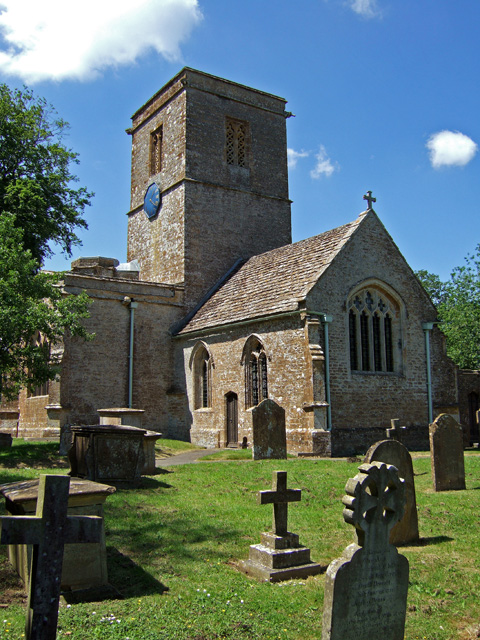

- Location within Somerset
- 50°52′57″N 2°45′0″W
- Location: North Perrott, Somerset, England

History
- Built: 12th century

Listed Building – Grade I
- Official name: Church of St Martin
- Designated: 19 April 1961
- Reference no.: 1056879

The Church of St Martin in North Perrott, Somerset, England, dates from the 12th century and has been designated as a Grade I listed building.

The current church which is near the River Parrett, was built on the site of an earlier church and including some of the fabric, in the 16th century, probably by Henry Daubeney, 1st Earl of Bridgewater.

The tower dates from the 12th century and contains six bells. The oldest was cast in 1786 by George Davis of Bridgwater. Four others were made by members of the Bilbie family in 1803.

The parish is part of the Wulfric benefice within the Crewkerne and Ilminster deanery.

== See also ==
- Grade I listed buildings in South Somerset
- List of Somerset towers
- List of ecclesiastical parishes in the Diocese of Bath and Wells
