= Elizabeth Ham =

English poet and writer

- Born: 30 November 1783; North Perrott, Somerset, England
- Died: 1 March 1859 (aged 75)
- Occupations: Poet, writer

Elizabeth Ham (30 November 1783 - 1 March 1859) was an English poet and writer active in the late Georgian and early Victorian era. She is noted for her social observations of Ireland between 1804 and 1809 which appeared in her novel The Ford Family in Ireland (1845) and her posthumously published memoir Elizabeth Ham by herself 1783-1820 (1945).

== Early life ==
Elizabeth Ham was born in North Perrott, Somerset, England on 30 November 1783. She was the third of seven children of Thomas Ham, a yeoman farmer and brewer, and Elizabeth Ham. She was sometimes separated from her parents and siblings, until the family settled in Dorchester and Weymouth. She occasionally attended schools, including a brief period at a boarding school. In Weymouth she attended plays, balls, parties and other social events. Her memoir recalls George III visiting the family farm.

== Life in Ireland ==
In 1804, Ham's father moved the family, including the 21-year-old Elizabeth, to Ireland. After a winter in Carlow, they eventually settled in Ballina, County Mayo where her father set up a malting business to supply a brewery in Guernsey. Ham fell in love with a junior officer who then left her, and she never married. Ham's father's business did not thrive, and the family returned to England.

Whilst living in Ireland, Ham wrote down her impressions of Irish society including the poor. These would inform her writing work in later years.

== Later years and writing ==
Ham lived with various relatives around Somerset and Dorset for the remainder of her life. She served as a housekeeper, maid or nurse as required for her family members, in return for board. She taught for a while at a small school in Fordington.

Around 1820, Ham became a governess for the poet Charles Elton at his family home in Clifton, Bristol. With Elton's help, Ham published an anonymous book, An Infant's Grammar, and a long narrative poem, Elgiva, or The Monks. An Infant's Grammer had illustrations which Ham had provided but which were much altered by publisher John Harris's illustrator. It sold well, and Ham regretted not having her name on it as it might have provided her some financial stability.

In 1845, Ham wrote a novel based on her time in Ireland, The Ford Family in Ireland. The Spectator 's reviewer though Ham had an aptitude for describing the social scene and characters but was dismissive of her 'Whiggish' politics and plotting.

In 1849, Ham started writing her memoir and she continued with this after moving to Wick House in Brislington where she worked as a housekeeper.

Ham died of heart disease on 1 March 1859.

An abridged version of her memoir, covering the period 1783 to 1820, was published in 1945 with an introduction by Eric Gillett. Excepts of it were printed in The Listener magazine, and broadcast on the BBC.
