= Ben Wellington =

English cricketer

Personal information
- Full name: Benjamin Mark Wellington
- Born: 30 April 1974 (age 52); Taunton, Somerset, England, UK
- Batting: Right-handed
- Bowling: Right-arm medium

Domestic team information
- Years: Team
- 1999: Somerset Cricket Board

Career statistics
Competition	LA
Matches	1
Runs scored	5
Batting average	–
100s/50s	–/–
Top score	5*
Balls bowled	18
Wickets	–
Bowling average	–
5 wickets in innings	–
10 wickets in match	–
Best bowling	–
Catches/stumpings	–/–
- Source: Cricinfo, 20 October 2010

Benjamin 'Ben' Mark Wellington (born 30 April 1974) is a former English cricketer. Wellington was a right-handed batsman who bowled right-arm medium pace. He was born at Taunton, Somerset.

Wellington represented the Somerset Cricket Board in a single List A match against Bedfordshire in the 2nd round of the 1999 NatWest Trophy at the County Ground, Taunton. In his only List A match, he scored an unbeaten 5 runs.
