= North Perrott Manor House =

School in North Perrott, England

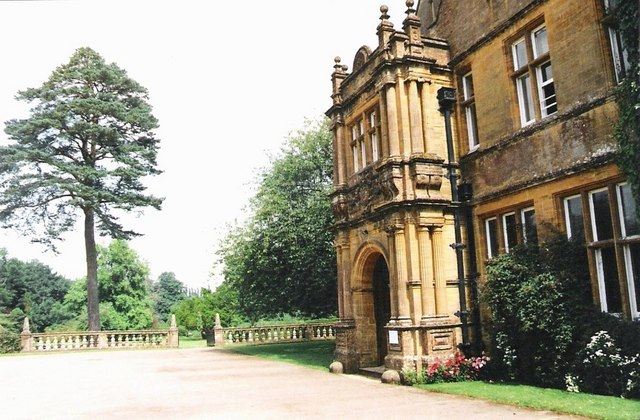

- Location within Somerset
- 50.8838°N 2.7583°W
- Location: North Perrott, Somerset, England

History
- Built: 1877

Site notes
- Architect: Thomas Henry Wyatt

Listed Building – Grade II*
- Official name: North Perrott Manor House (Perrott Hill School)
- Designated: 18 December 1987
- Reference no.: 1175931

North Perrott Manor House which later became Perrott Hill School in North Perrott, Somerset, England was built in 1877 by Thomas Henry Wyatt. It is a Grade II* listed building.

== History ==
The Manor House was built in 1877 by Thomas Henry Wyatt for P.M. Hoskyns. The Hoskyns family lived in the house until 1940 when pupils from Feltonfleet School in Surrey were evacuated to North Perrott Manor House. After World War II it became Perrott Hill School. The Private school is a prep school for children from 3 to 13 years. Boarding facilities are provided in the old house.

While in use as the school additional buildings and sports facilities have been added, including a music building with a sedum roof.

== Architecture ==
The L-shaped two-storey hamstone building has clay tiled roofs. The front of the building has a porch with an archway flanked by Doric columns. To the south side of the building is an orangery the roof of which was replaced after bomb damage in World War II.

There is a two-storey stable block. The courtyard is surrounded by a hamstone wall with stone balusters. A stone summerhouse is set into the wall.

The grounds include a sunken garden with stone seats and ornaments.
