= Mathew Dimond =

English cricketer

Personal information
- Born: 24 September 1975 (age 51); Taunton, Somerset, England
- Batting: Right-handed
- Bowling: Right-arm fast-medium

Domestic team information
- Years: Team
- 1994–1997: Somerset
- 1999–2002: Somerset Cricket Board
- FC debut: 2 June 1994 Somerset v Hampshire
- Last FC: 29 May 1997 Somerset v Worcestershire
- LA debut: 12 June 1994 Somerset v Yorkshire
- Last LA: 29 August 2002 Somerset CB v Cornwall

Career statistics
Competition	First-class	List A
Matches	5	9
Runs scored	71	35
Batting average	17.75	11.66
100s/50s	0/0	0/0
Top score	26	13*
Balls bowled	483	350
Wickets	6	6
Bowling average	52.66	46.33
5 wickets in innings	0	0
10 wickets in match	0	0
Best bowling	4/73	2/41
Catches/stumpings	4/–	1/–
- Source: CricketArchive, 8 January 2011

Mathew Dimond (born 24 September 1975) is a former English cricketer who made played for Somerset County Cricket Club between 1994 and 1997. Early in his career, he toured the West Indies with the England Under-19 cricket team, playing three Tests and one One Day International at Under-19 level.

== Career ==
A right-arm fast-medium bowler, he made his first-class debut for Somerset in June 1994. Playing in the County Championship against Hampshire, Dimond claimed a solitary wicket in the match, which was shortened to single innings due to rain. He played two further Championship matches that season, and claimed his best return against Yorkshire, picking up four wickets in the first innings of their contest. He played three List A matches during his debut season, but failed to claim a wicket in any of them. He was selected to tour with the England Under-19 cricket team, travelling to the West Indies during the 1994–95 season, where he played three Under-19 Tests and a single One Day International. His eleven wickets during the Test series, highlighted by a five-wicket haul in the second Test, saw him finish the tour as England's joint second most prolific bowler, level with Andrew Flintoff and trailing only Vikram Solanki.

Dimond made two further first-class appearances for Somerset, claiming just one wicket between the two matches. Dimond played for the Somerset Cricket Board from 1998 until 2002, in both the Minor Counties competition and the early rounds of the NatWest Trophy.
