= Gary L. Bennett =

American novelist

Gary L. Bennett (born January 17, 1940) is an American scientist and engineer, specializing in aerospace and energy. He has worked for NASA and the US Department of Energy (DOE) on advanced space power systems and advanced space propulsion systems. His professional career has included work on the Voyager, Galileo, and Ulysses space missions, and is currently working as a consultant in aerospace power and propulsion systems. He is also a science fiction author (The Star Sailors).

== Biography ==
Bennett was born in Twin Falls, Idaho. He joined the NASA headquarters in June 1988 as the Manager of Advanced Space Power Systems in the transportation division of the Office of Advanced Concepts and Technology. There, he managed a number of transportation technology programs including hybrid propulsion, electric propulsion, low-thrust chemical propulsion, and other advanced propulsion concepts (e.g., fusion, antimatter). He was also the first program manager of the advanced technology insertion program for the Pluto Fast Flyby (now New Horizons) mission and the TIMED space physics mission.

Prior to coming to NASA, Bennett held key positions in DoE's space radioisotope power program, including serving as Director of Safety and Nuclear Operations for the radioisotope power sources that were used on the Galileo mission to Jupiter and that are being used on the Ulysses mission to explore the polar regions of the Sun. This same radioisotope power source design was then flown on the Cassini mission to Saturn and on the New Horizons mission to Jupiter.

Previous positions included Chief of the Research Support Branch in the US Nuclear Regulatory Commission (NRC) where Bennett was instrumental in creating and managing NRC's reactor operational safety research program.

Bennett was the flight safety manager for the radioisotope power sources currently in use on the Voyager 1 and Voyager 2 spacecraft (which went to Jupiter, Saturn, Uranus, Neptune and beyond) and on Lincoln Laboratory's LES 8 and LES 9 communications satellites.

Bennett also worked as a physicist in the NERVA (Nuclear Engine for Rocket Vehicle Applications) program at what was then NASA's Lewis Research Center (now the John H. Glenn Research Center) in Cleveland, Ohio. He did fundamental reactor safety research at what is now the Department of Energy's Idaho National Laboratory (INL).

From 1980 to 1988, he was a member of or adviser to US delegations to the two subcommittees of the United Nations Committee on the Peaceful Uses of Outer Space and he prepared the official US position papers on the use of nuclear power sources in outer space.

From 1988 to 1990, Bennett chaired the Steering Group of the Interagency Advanced Power Group (IAPG), the national coordinating group for federally sponsored space and terrestrial power research. During his tenure and under his initiative the IAPG saw its greatest increase in membership.

Bennett received his PhD in physics from Washington State University in 1970; a Master of Nuclear Science degree in 1966, and a BSc degree in physics from the University of Idaho in 1962; and an Associate of Arts degree from Boise Junior College (now Boise State University) in 1960.

Since 1995, he has been active in promoting the teaching of science (specifically evolution) and received the Friend of Darwin Award. Bennett has also been a champion of the First Amendment and was elected to the National Advisory Council of Americans United for Separation of Church and State.

== Selected works ==
Bennett has authored or coauthored over 160 technical papers, reports and articles on power, propulsion, and space missions.

Science fiction

- G.L. Bennett (1980). The Star Sailors. ISBN 978-0-312-75582-9.

Chapters in:

- M.S. El-Genk (1997). A Critical Review of Space Nuclear Power and Propulsion, 1984-1993. American Inst. of Physics. ISBN 978-1-56396-317-9.
- D.M. Rowe (1995). CRC Handbook of Thermoelectrics. CRC-Press. ISBN 978-0-8493-0146-9.
- R.A. Meyers (2001). Encyclopedia of Physical Science and Technology (3rd ed.). Elsevier Science. ISBN 978-0-12-227410-7.

== Awards ==
- In 2000, he received the Friend of Darwin Award by the National Center for Science Education
- In 1996, he received the Schreiber-Spence Space Achievement Award for his leadership of the safety and nuclear operations for the Galileo and Ulysses radioisotope power source programs.
- In 1995, he shared in the American Institute of Aeronautics and Astronautics (AIAA) Aerospace Power Systems Award and Medal for his leadership of the Ulysses radioisotope power source program.
- In 1994, he received the Silver & Gold Award from the University of Idaho Alumni Association
- In 1990, he received the Distinguished Alumnus Award from Boise State University

== Associations ==
- American Institute of Aeronautics and Astronautics (fellow)
- American Physical Society (fellow)
- British Interplanetary Society (fellow)
