= Manor Park, Horsford =

Cricket ground in Norfolk, England

Manor Park
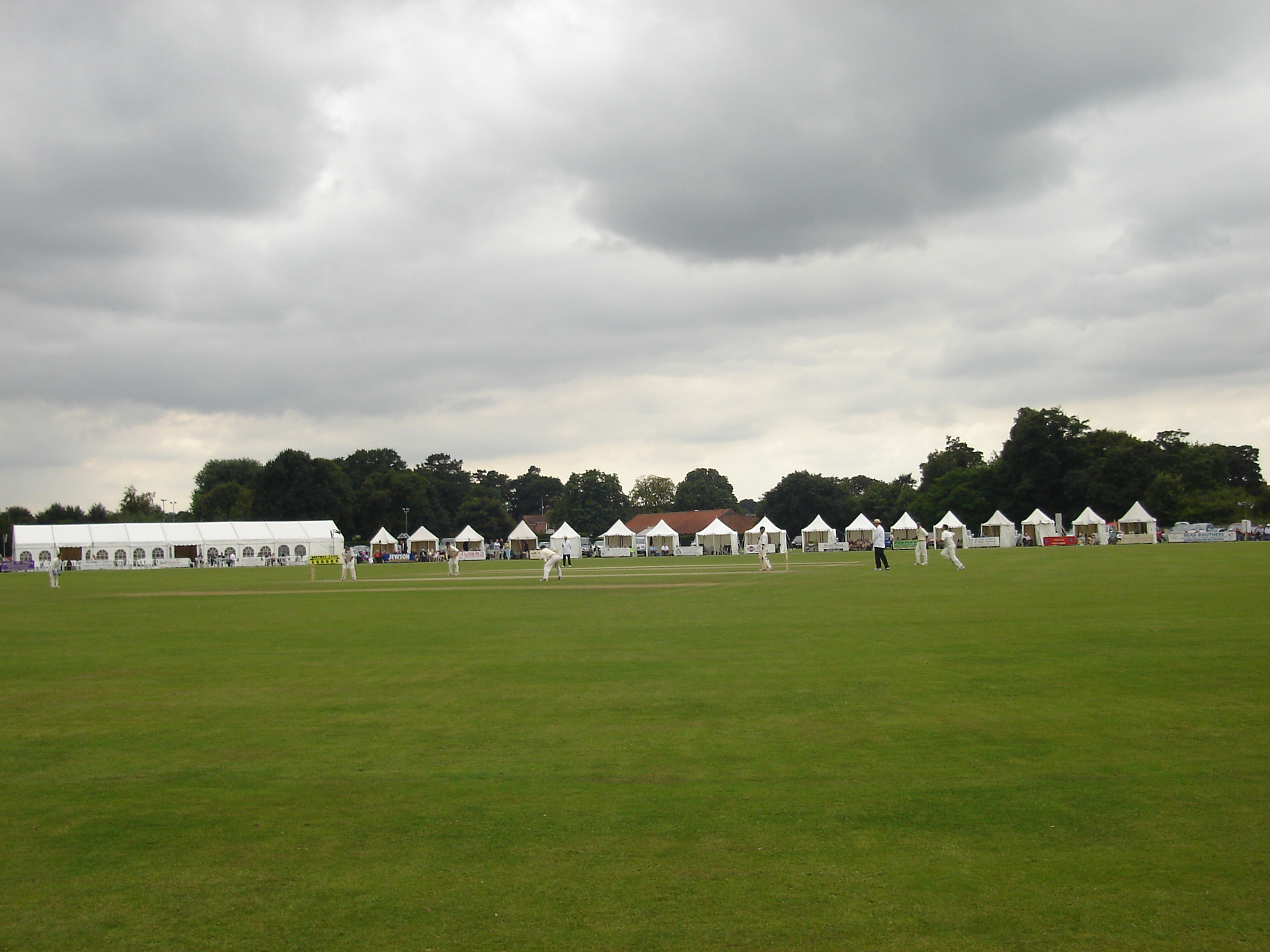
- Interactive map of Manor Park

Ground information
- Location: Horsford, Norfolk
- Country: England
- Coordinates: 52.678°N 1.260°E
- Establishment: 1980

Team information
Norfolk	(2001–2024)
- As of 9 April 2025; Source: Ground profile

Manor Park is a cricket ground at Horsford in Norfolk. The ground, which is on the northern edge of the city of Norwich, was the main home ground of Norfolk County Cricket Club between 2001 and 2024. The ground is owned and operated by Horsford Cricket Club who play in the East Anglian Premier Cricket League.

== History ==
Following the formation of Horsford Cricket Club in 1947, the club played matches close to the current Manor Park ground until the 1970s. The current ground was established in 1980. The first representative match on the ground was a MCCA Knockout Trophy match between Norfolk and Suffolk played in 1986. After a second match in the same competition against Oxfordshire the county did not use the ground again until 2001.

The county established its base at Horsford following the closure of the County Ground in Lakenham in 2000. The ground, which was close to the centre of Nowich, had been used by the county team since the 19th century before being redeveloped for housing. In early 2025, Norfolk announced that they would move to use Barker's Lane at Sprowston after it proved to be impossible to agree financial terms with Horsford Cricket Club.

== Matches on the ground ==
Following the two 1986 matches, Norfolk played their first Minor Counties Championship match on the ground in 2001 with Lincolnshire as the opposition. From 2001 to 2024, the county played five List A, 65 Minor Counties Championship, 43 MCCA Knockout Trophy, and 16 MCCA Twenty20 matches on the ground.

The first List A match played on the ground in May 2001 saw Norfolk play Wales Minor Counties in the second round of the 2001 Cheltenham & Gloucester Trophy. Later in the year the county played the Netherlands and Somerset Cricket Board in two 2002 Cheltenham & Gloucester Trophy matches. The following season Kent, the only first-class county to play a representative match on the ground, beat Norfolk in the third round of the same competition. The last List A match on the ground was an August 2003 fixture against Lincolnshire in the 2004 Cheltenham & Gloucester Trophy.
