= Gary Bennett (referee) =

Australian rugby league referee

Refereeing information
Years	Competition	Apps
1971–1974	New South Wales Rugby League	19

Gary Bennett is an Australian former rugby league referee.

Bennett began his refereeing career in the Newtown District Junior Rugby League. He was subsequently graded to referee in the New South Wales Rugby League (NSWRL), gaining his first first-grade match in 1971. He went on to control 19 top grade matches between 1971 and 1974.

Away from rugby league Bennett was a teacher and education administrator.
