= Garry Knox Bennett =

American artist (1934–2022)

- Bennett working on a bandsaw.
- Born: Garry Knox Bennett; October 8, 1934; Alameda, California
- Died: January 28, 2022 (aged 87)
- Known for: Furniture

Garry Knox Bennett (October 8, 1934 – January 28, 2022) was an American woodworker, furniture maker, metalworker and artist from Alameda, California. His workshop and studio was in Oakland, California.

== Early life and education ==
Bennett was born in Alameda, California in 1934. He went to Alameda High School and met his wife, Sylvia here. Bennett eventually studied painting and sculpture at California College of the Arts (formerly California College of Arts and Crafts).

== Career ==
Bennett and Sylvia moved to Lincoln, California and built a home in Bennett's ex-stepfather acreage. They eventually moved back to the bay area.

In 1965, Bennett started Squirkenworks and sold peace symbols, roach clips and assorted accoutrements. After Richard Nixon outlawed paraphernalia, the store closed down in 1974.

== Exhibitions and recognition ==
Bennett has permanent exhibitions, including at the Smithsonian, Oakland Museum of Art and the Boston Museum of Fine Arts.

He has also won awards including the Award of Distinction Recipient from the Furniture Society and honored as Fellow of the American Craft Council.

== In popular culture ==
Bennett was featured in the season seven episode of Parks and Recreation (TV series), as the only human celebrity recognized by the lead character, Ron Swanson.

== Bibliography ==
- Made in Oakland: The Furniture of Garry Knox Bennett ISBN 1-890385-03-4
