= Keith Parsons =

English cricketer (born 1973)

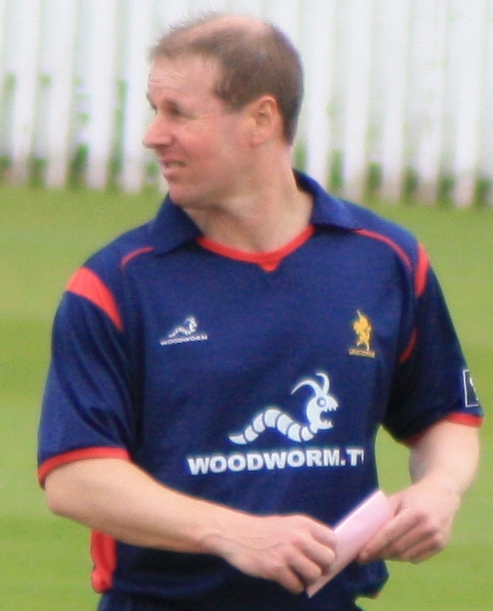

Personal information
- Full name: Keith Alan Parsons
- Born: 2 May 1973 (age 53); Taunton, Somerset, England
- Nickname: Pilot, Pars, Orv, Coach Keith, The Real KP, K Dog, GOAT
- Height: 6 ft 1 in (1.85 m)
- Batting: Right-handed
- Bowling: Right-arm medium
- Role: All-rounder
- Relatives: Kevin Parsons (twin brother)

Domestic team information
- Years: Team
- 1992–2008: Somerset
- 2010–2013: Unicorns
- FC debut: 13 May 1992 Somerset v Pakistanis
- Last FC: 12 September 2006 Somerset v Northamptonshire
- LA debut: 23 May 1993 Somerset v Worcestershire
- Last LA: 18 August 2013 Unicorns v Leicestershire

Career statistics
Competition	FC	LA	T20
Matches	130	292	31
Runs scored	5,324	6,251	464
Batting average	28.62	29.76	20.17
100s/50s	6/28	2/33	0/1
Top score	193*	121	57*
Balls bowled	8,005	6,345	338
Wickets	106	146	18
Bowling average	43.83	36.43	25.94
5 wickets in innings	2	1	0
10 wickets in match	0	0	0
Best bowling	5/13	5/39	3/12
Catches/stumpings	115/–	107/–	9/–
- Source: Cricinfo, 30 December 2022

Keith Alan Parsons (born 2 May 1973) is an English cricketer who played first-class and List A cricket for Somerset between 1992 and 2008. He is a right-handed batsman and right-arm medium pace bowler.

Parsons made his first-class debut in 1992 against the Pakistanis and his Championship debut the next season. He scored 6 first-class centuries including 193 not out against the West Indians in 2000 and a Championship best of 153 against Essex in 2006. His best bowling was 5–13 against Lancashire in 2000.

Parsons received his county cap in 1999, and had a benefit year in 2004. On 11 August 2008 he retired from first-class cricket having not represented the Somerset first-team during the 2008 season. Parsons retired as only the second person in Somerset history (alongside Ian Botham) to score 5,000 runs and take 100 wickets in both first-class and List A cricket.

Parsons played Minor County cricket for Cornwall in 2009 before being appointed captain of the Unicorns cricket team which played in the inaugural Clydesdale Bank 40 limited over competition.

He has a twin brother, Kevin, who played for Somerset in seven one-day games.
