= Gary Bennett (cricketer) =

English cricketer

Personal information
- Full name: Gary Mark Bennett
- Born: 10 December 1971 (age 54); Taunton, Somerset, England
- Batting: Right-handed
- Bowling: Right-arm medium

Domestic team information
- Years: Team
- 1999-2000: Somerset Cricket Board

Career statistics
Competition	LA
Matches	2
Runs scored	6
Batting average	3.00
100s/50s	–/–
Top score	5
Balls bowled	30
Wickets	–
Bowling average	–
5 wickets in innings	–
10 wickets in match	–
Best bowling	–
Catches/stumpings	–/–
- Source: Cricinfo, 20 October 2010

Gary Mark Bennett (born 10 December 1971) is a former English cricketer. Bennett was a right-handed batsman who bowled right-arm medium pace. He was born at Taunton, Somerset.

Bennett represented the Somerset Cricket Board in 2 List A matches against Bedfordshire in the 2nd round of the 1999 NatWest Trophy and Staffordshire in the 1st round of the 2000 NatWest Trophy. In his 2 List A matches, he scored 6 runs at a batting average of 3.00, with a high score of 5.
