= South Perrott =

Village in Dorset, England

Coordinates: 50.8581°N 2.7506°W

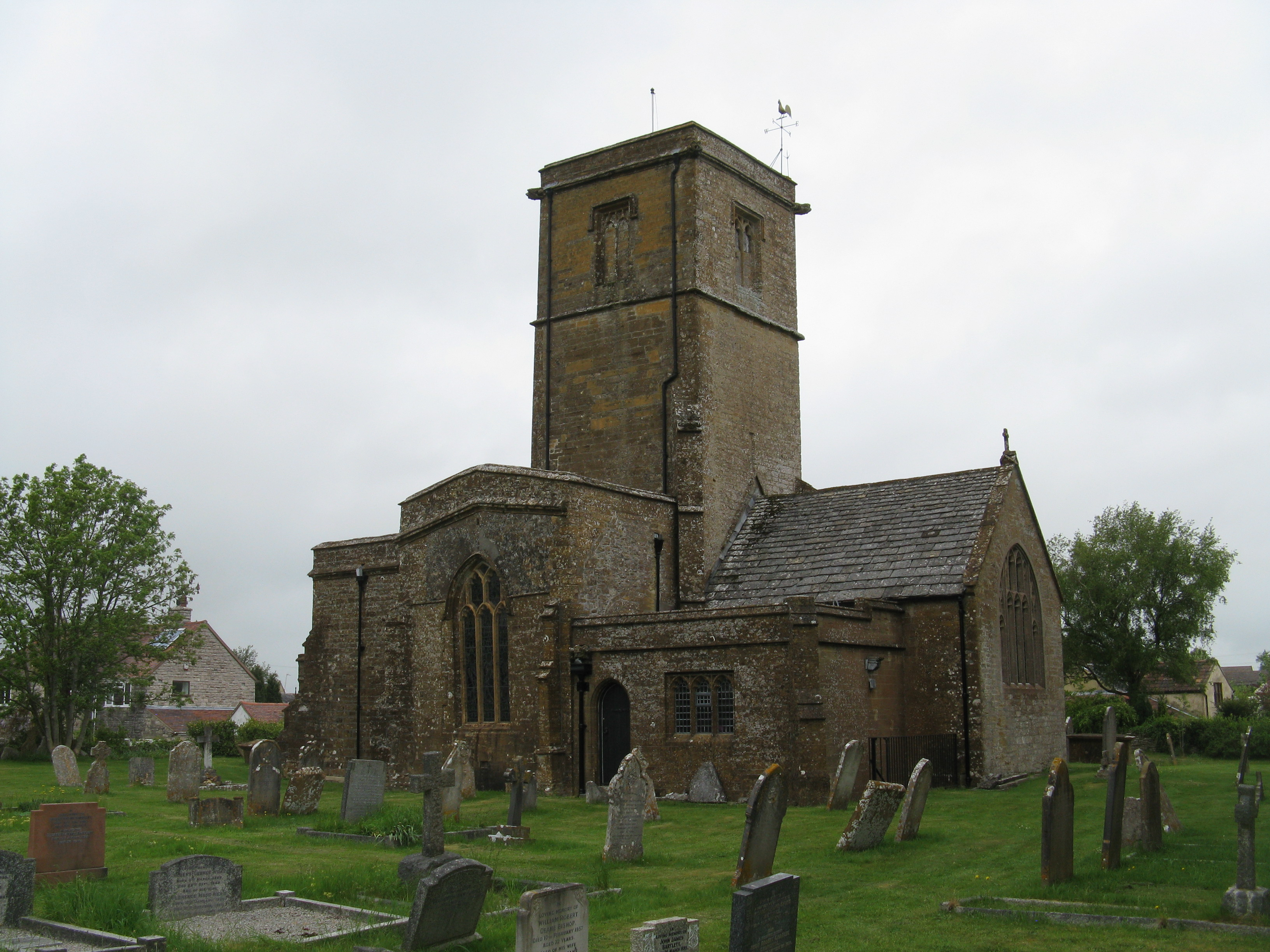
- South Perrott Church

- Location within Dorset
- Population: 220
- Civil parish: South Perrott
- Unitary authority: Dorset
- Ceremonial county: Dorset
- Region: South West
- Country: England
- Sovereign state: United Kingdom
- Post town: Beaminster
- Postcode district: DT8
- Police: Dorset
- Fire: Dorset and Wiltshire
- Ambulance: South Western
- UK Parliament: West Dorset

South Perrott is a village and civil parish in northwest Dorset, England, 2 miles (3.2 km) southeast of Crewkerne. In 2012 the estimated population of the parish was 220. Figures from the 2011 census have been published for South Perrott parish combined with the neighbouring parish of Chedington; the population in these areas was 367.

The name Perrott comes from the River Parrett.

The manor was held with North Perrott just over the border in Somerset.

Immediately south of the church are some earthworks, the remains of the moated enclosures of Mohun Castle. A geophysical survey of this site was undertaken in 1996.

== Religious sites ==
The Parish Church of St. Mary can be found in the southern part of the village. The church is cruciform in shape, with a prominent central tower that has a plain parapet and gargoyles. The central crossing, transepts, nave and west porch date from the 13th century, while the central tower was rebuilt in the 15th century. A chapel was added to the south side of the chancel in the 16th century. Between 1907 and 1913, the chancel and south chapel were rebuilt and a number of other changes made. In the north wall of the chancel there are two roundels of 18th century glass, one depicting the Crucifixion, the other the Last Supper. The weather vane on the tower takes the form of a copper cockerel. The Church is a Grade I listed building.

The tower contains six bells, the whole ring being cast by Mears and Stainbank at the Whitechapel foundry and dedicated in 1927 by Bishop Jocelyn, Archdeacon of Sherborne. The bell historian Christopher Dalton points out that this was the first complete ring of bells in Dorset cast by the Whitechapel foundry after it had adopted the true-harmonic principle of tuning (and only its third complete ring using this principle). Before the augmentation there were three bells, the lightest dated 1828 by John Kingston (Bridgewater), the second dated 1602 (inscribed: "ANNO DOMINI 1602 RP") with the tenor apparently from the same founder, but dated 1650. Dalton thinks that the latter may be an error for 1605, and concludes that they were both early works of Richard Purdue I of Stoford, Somerset.

Since 1979, St Mary's, South Perrott has been part of the Beaminster Area Team Ministry (Diocese of Salisbury).
