= North Perrott Cricket Club Ground =

Former cricket ground in England

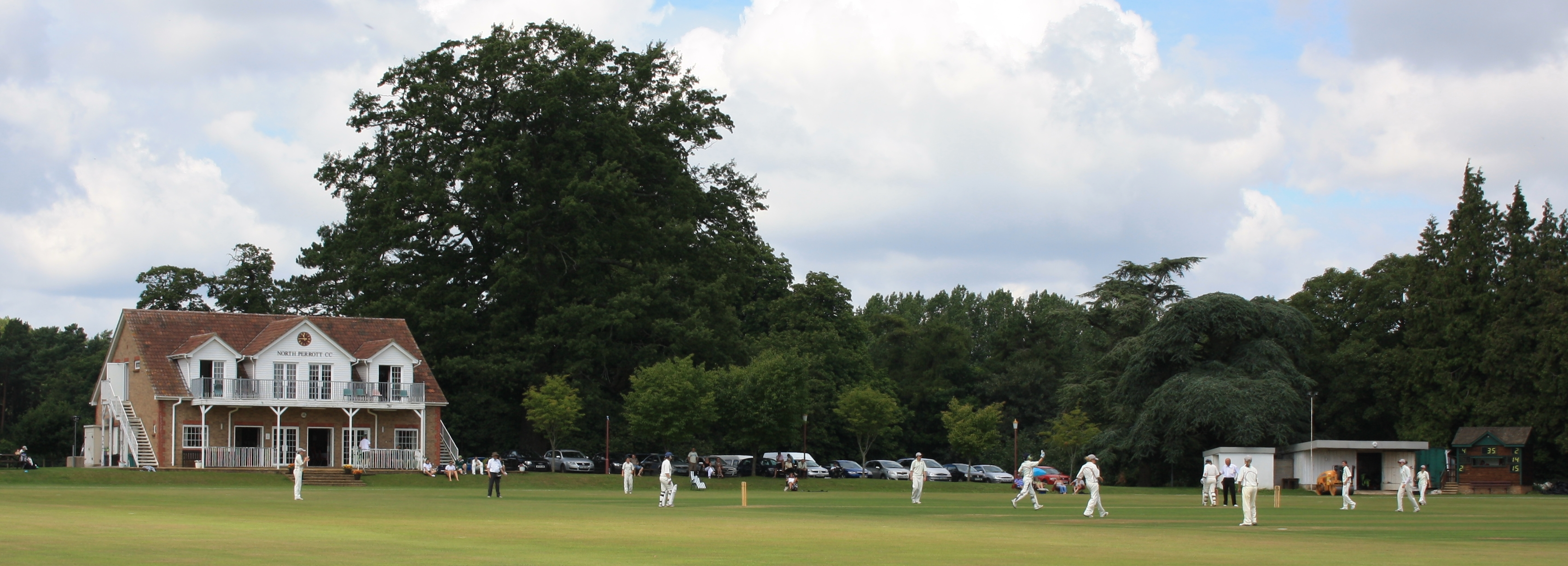
- Interactive map of North Perrott Cricket Club Ground

Ground information
- Location: North Perrott, Somerset
- Country: England
- Coordinates: 50.8848°N 2.7519°W
- Establishment: 1946

Team information
| North Perrott | (1946–present) |
| Somerset Cricket Board | (2000–2002) |
| Somerset women | (2005–present) |
- As of 24 July 2010; Source: CricketArchive

North Perrott Cricket Club Ground is a former List A cricket ground located in North Perrott, Somerset. It hosted a single Cheltenham & Gloucester Trophy match in 2001 between Somerset Cricket Board and Wales Minor Counties. The ground has also been used by Somerset County Cricket Club and Board for numerous other matches. It has also hosted the Somerset women's cricket team occasionally since 2005. The ground is home to North Perrott Cricket Club, and has been since its creation in 1946.

== History ==
=== Ground development ===
The ground, located on Willis Lane, was levelled and a wicket laid soon after the end of the Second World War. Courtesy of the Hoskyns family, North Perrott Cricket Club began using the ground in 1946. In 1993, the club purchased the ground from the family, thanks in part to an anonymous sponsor, and a grant from the Sports and Arts Foundation. Becoming owners of the ground, the club sought to build a pavilion, and after fund-raising and obtaining planning permission, the pavilion was officially opened in the 2000 season. A couple of years later, the club built a new score-hut, and in 2004 upgraded to an electronic scoreboard.

=== Usage by Somerset County Cricket Club ===
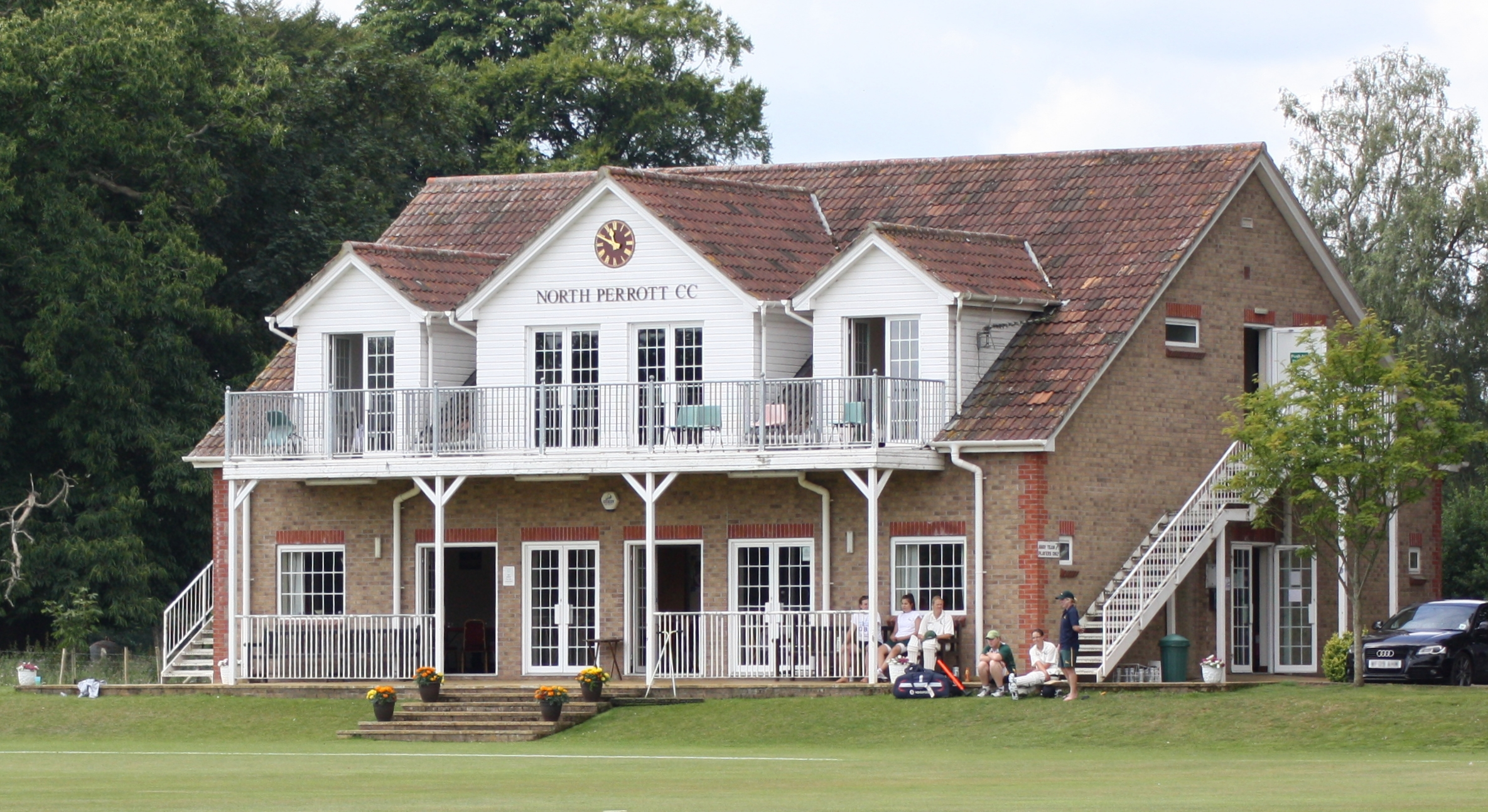
The pavilion, which was opened in 2000

North Perrott Cricket Club Ground was first used by Somerset County Cricket Club in 1991, when their second XI played a Second XI Championship match against Glamorgan's seconds. Somerset's seconds continued to use the ground regularly over the following years, playing 17 Second XI Championship matches and seven Second XI Trophy matches at the venue. The Somerset Cricket Board team were also fixtures on the ground for four matches. In addition to the first-round match against Wales Minor Counties in the Cheltenham & Gloucester Trophy, they were also scheduled to play three Minor Counties Trophy matches – two of these were abandoned. In recent years, the ground has also been used by Somerset women's cricket team. The women's side has no fixed home ground, playing at a variety of venues across the county, and first played at North Perrott in 2005. Since then, visits to the ground have become more regular, with over half of their home fixtures in 2009 and 2010 being played there.
