= Somerset Cricket Board =

- Sport: Cricket
- Abbreviation: SCB
- Location: County Ground, Taunton
- Chairman: Andy Curtis

Official website
- www.somersetcountycc.co.uk/scb/

The Somerset Cricket Board (SCB) is the governing body for all recreational cricket in the historic county of Somerset, and was established in 1994 under its first Cricket Development Officer Andrew Moulding. Following a restructuring in January 2010, the SCB now operates as a limited company. The current SCB Chairman is Andy Curtis, and the Cricket Development Manager is Andy Fairbairn.

The Somerset Cricket Board competed in the MCCA Knockout Trophy between 1998 and 2002. They have appeared in five List A matches, making two NatWest Trophy and three Cheltenham & Gloucester Trophy appearances.

== List A players ==
See List of Somerset Cricket Board List A players and Category:Somerset Cricket Board cricketers

== Grounds ==
Below is a complete list of grounds used by the Somerset Cricket Board representative side when it was permitted to play List A and MCCA Knockout Trophy matches.

Name	Location	First	Last	Matches	First	Last	Matches	Refs
Name	Location	List A			MCCA Trophy			Refs
County Ground	Taunton	only match: 17 May 1999 v Bedfordshire		1	10 May 1998 v Cornwall	13 May 2001 v Devon	5	
Recreation Ground	Bath	–	–	0	only match: 6 June 1999 v Dorset		1	
North Perrott Cricket Club Ground	North Perrott	only match: 1 May 2001 v Wales Minor Counties		1	28 May 2000 v Cornwall	16 June 2002 v Cornwall	3	
Bristol Optimists Cricket Club Ground	Bristol	–	–	0	only match: 14 May 2000 v Wiltshire		1	
