= Chell, Staffordshire =

Suburb of Stoke-on-Trent, England

Coordinates: 53.0715°N 2.1964°W

Chell
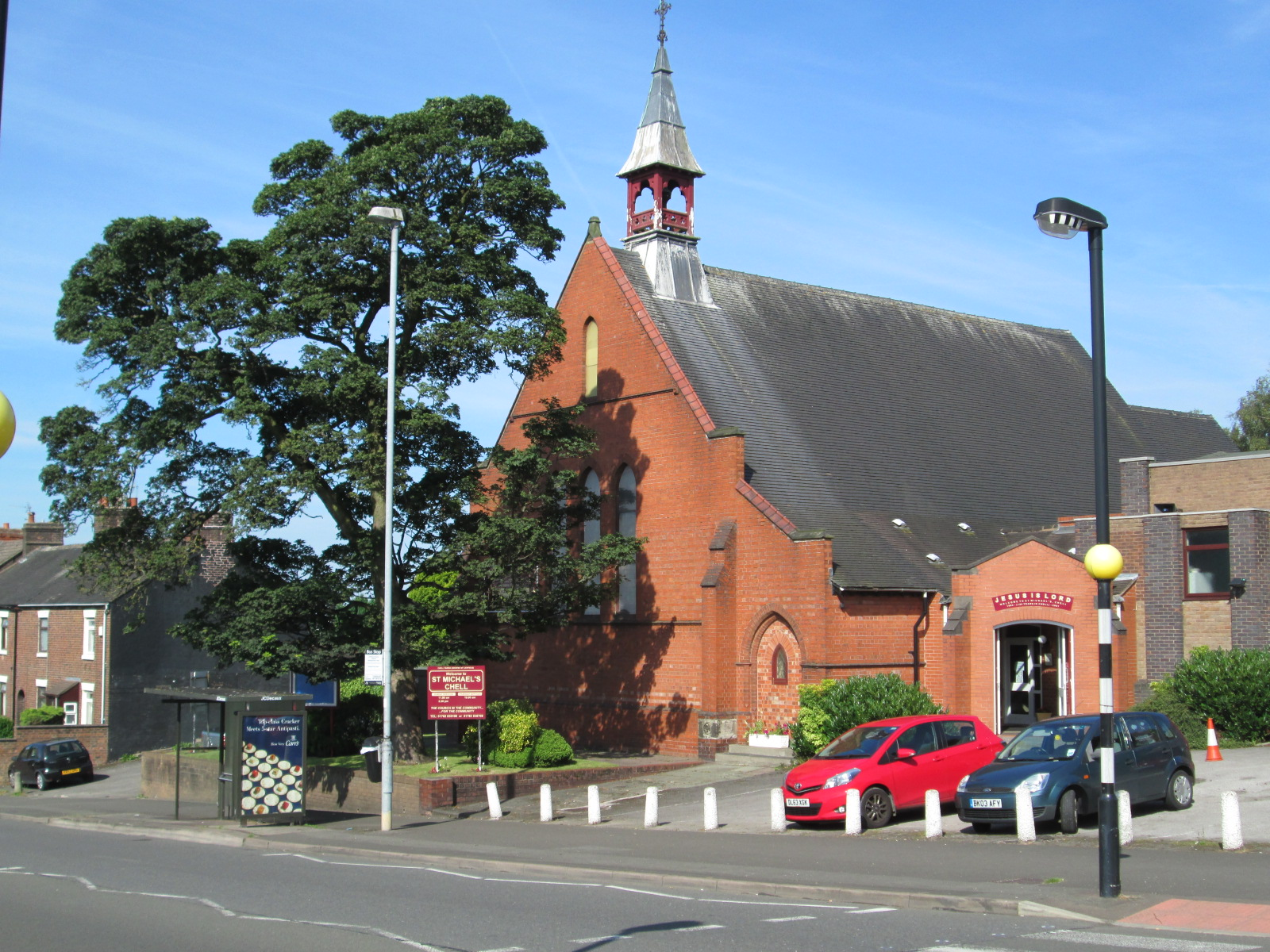
- St Michael's Church, Great Chell

- Location within Staffordshire
- OS grid reference: SJ 869,520
- Unitary authority: Stoke-on-Trent
- Ceremonial county: Staffordshire
- Region: West Midlands
- Country: England
- Sovereign state: United Kingdom
- Post town: STOKE-ON-TRENT
- Postcode district: ST6
- Dialling code: 01782
- Police: Staffordshire
- Fire: Staffordshire
- Ambulance: West Midlands
- UK Parliament: Stoke-on-Trent North

Chell is a suburb of the city of Stoke-on-Trent in the ceremonial county of Staffordshire, England, that can be subdivided into Little Chell, Great Chell and Chell Heath. It lies on the northern edge of the city, approximately 1-mile (1.6 km) from Tunstall, 2 miles (3.2 km) from Burslem and 3 miles (4.8 km) from the county border with Cheshire. Chell borders Pitts Hill to the west, Tunstall to the south west, Stanfield and Bradeley to the south, with the outlying villages of Packmoor and Brindley Ford to the north and Ball Green to the east. Since 2011 the area has been divided into the electoral wards of Bradeley & Chell Heath, Great Chell & Packmoor and Little Chell & Stanfield.

== History ==
There is no mention of Chell in the Domesday Book, it is believed to have come under the lands of Wolstanton. The earliest written record of Chell comes from 1212, by which time Chell had already been split into Little and Great Chell. Prior to 1212 the lord of the manor was Adam de Audley. He was succeeded by his son Henry de Audley who in 1212 confirmed in writing his father's decision to award one third of Chell to Robert Blund when giving him a further 14 acres 'in the wood between Chell and Thunstal'. Henry de Audley later gave the remaining two-thirds of Chell to Richard of Hanley, who is recorded under the name Richard Chell c.1230. Chell is now a common family name in north Staffordshire. There are few records of Little Chell manor after 1344 suggesting it had merged with Great Chell manor. However, the earliest confirmation of this is in 1679 when the Sneyd family, owners of Great Chell Manor, are known to have also taken over Little Chell Manor. The Sneyd family held these manors into the 19th century.

William Henry Duignan traced the etymology of Chell back to Ceolegh. "Ceole" meant throat or narrow valley in Old English and Chell is situated at the edge of a ridge of land by a narrow valley. Another possibility is that the township was named after a person known as Ceol- Ceol's Lea, lea meaning meadow.

In 1666 surveys conducted for the then recently implemented Hearth Tax recorded a total of ten households in Chell as being liable for payment of the tax on a total of 15 hearths. No households were recorded as being too poor to pay the tax. Chell receives a mention in William White's 1851 History, gazetteer, and directory of Staffordshire: "CHELL (GREAT AND LITTLE) form a liberty of 740 acres and 737 souls. Great Chell is on an eminence 2 ½ N. by E. of Burslem, and is occupied chiefly by potters. The Primitive Methodists have a chapel here, built in 1823, and enlarged in 1830 and 1841. The Union Workhouse is at Great Chell." Twenty years later Chell receive another mention in John Marius Wilson's grander Imperial Gazetteer of England and Wales, compiled 1870–72: "CHELL, a township in Wolstanton parish, Stafford; 2 miles north of Burslem. Population, 1219. Houses, 215. It contains the Wolstanton and Burslem workhouse; and its inhabitants are chiefly colliers and potterers."

In 1772 the celebrated canal engineer James Brindley died at his home, Turnhurst Hall, on what is now Turnhust Road, Great Chell.

Little Chell Water-Mill is first mentioned in 1539, as having belonged to the Colclough family for several generations. It is believed to have been situated on Scotia Brook, where it enters what is now Victoria Park, and ground corn. In 1757 the then owner, Thomas Baddeley of Newfield, contracted James Brindley to fit the mill with machinery for grinding flint and also pumping water out of a neighbouring mine. By 1832 the water-mill had been decommissioned and demolished, only the attached farmstead remained.

Chell Lodge, on the south side of Little Chell Lane, also known as Little Chell Hall, was built by wealthy potter Thomas Cartlich in the late 1830s. It was demolished in the 1920s to make way for the houses on Sproston and Scott Roads. Sited on the north side of Little Chell Lane, was Little Chell Farm, first documented in 1775. Blessed William Southern Roman Catholic County Secondary was built on this site in 1957 and was renamed St Margaret Ward's Catholic School in 1970. The school was renamed St Margaret Ward Catholic Academy in 2013.

The parish was formed on 31 December 1894 from part of Wolstanton parish, the Local Government Act 1894 put Chell under Wolstanton Rural District from its creation in 1895 to its abolition in 1904. Parts of Great Chell had by then already been transferred to Tunstall Urban District Council. Little Chell and Chell Heath were transferred to Smallthorne Urban District, which did not join the federation of Stoke-on-Trent until 1922, making Chell one of the last additions to Stoke-on-Trent. On 1 April 1922 the parish was abolished and merged with Stoke-on-Trent. In 1921 the parish had a population of 3539.

Barnett Grove and Stross Avenue, in Little Chell, off Little Chell Lane are named after Barnett Stross a former city councillor and MP for Hanley constituency from 1945 to 1950, and its replacement Stoke-on-Trent Central from 1950 to 1966. He is noted for founding and championing the global Lidice Shall Live campaign that sought to raise awareness of, and rebuild, the Czech village of Lidice, destroyed by the Nazis in 1942 in revenge for Reinhard Heydrich's murder by British trained Czechs.

Chatterley Whitfield Colliery is a disused coal-mine on the eastern outskirts of Chell. It was the largest mine in North Staffordshire and in 1937 it became the first colliery in the UK to produce 1,000,000 tons of saleable coal in a year. In 1976 coal drawing at Chatterley Whitfield came to an end, with the coal worked from Wolstanton Colliery, via a four-mile underground passageway, until it too closed in 1981. On 28 April 2014, Greene King Brewery opened a new £4.5m pub named The Chatterley Whitfield on the western outskirts of Chell.

=== Chell Workhouse ===
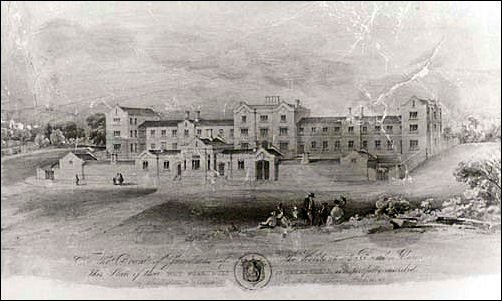
Chell Workhouse circa 1839

The Wolstanton And Burslem Union Workhouse was opened in 1839 in Turnhurst Road in Great Chell, at a cost of £6,900 to house 400 inmates. The workhouse remained in use beyond the Federation of Stoke-on-Trent whereupon the newly formed county borough took over the running of the facility. It finally closed in 1922, eight years before the workhouse system was abolished by act of parliament. Following this it became a municipal home for poor people until 1975 and therein remained vacant until it was demolished in 1993. A range was built to the south as a hospital in 1894. This became the Westcliffe Hospital, which was demolished in 2011, finally removing any substantial reminders of the workhouse's presence. In local novelist Arnold Bennett's book Clayhanger, the characters referred to the Chell workhouse as the Bastille.

== Geography and geology ==
Chell predominately lies on a north–south ridge of land west of Ford Green Brook and east of Scotia Brook, both tributaries of the River Trent. Scotia Brook is a designated Natural Heritage Site and is home to an important number of water voles. Great Chell, the northernmost and highest Chell, sits atop the ridge. Little Chell is situated south of Great Chell, lower down on the western ridge flank, alongside the grade II listed conservation area surrounding Victoria (or Tunstall) Park. Chell Heath lies east of both on the eastern flank, separated from Ball Green village by reclaimed spoil from Chatterley Whitfield Colliery.

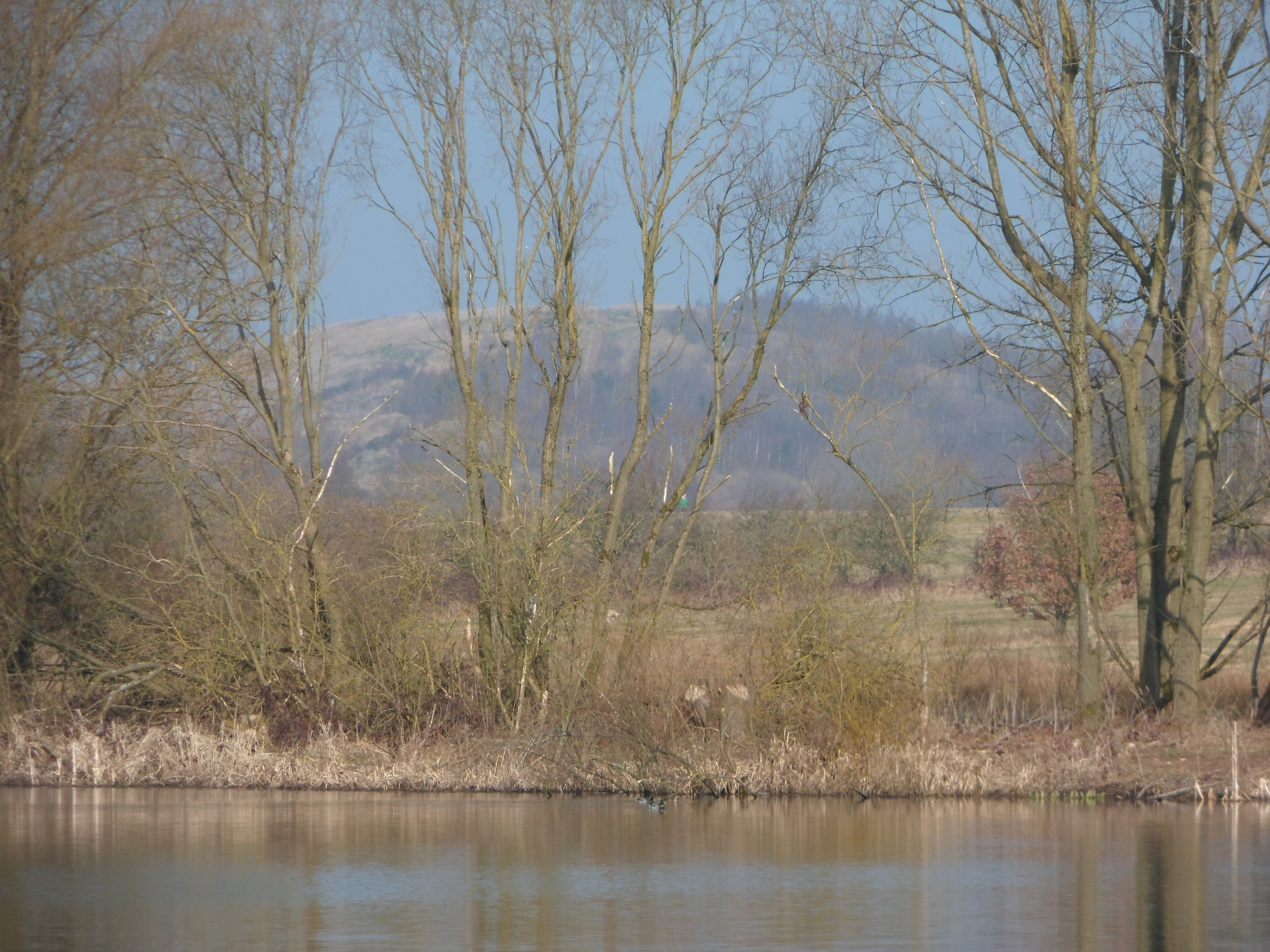
The landscaped spoil heap of the former Chatterley Whitfield mine, viewed across a lake of Whitfield Valley nature reserve.

The superficial geology beneath Chell consist of Devensian glacial tills, which overlie the Middle and Upper Pennine Coal Measures; the same sequences of sandstones, mudstones and coal seams as forms the impressive coalfields of Lancashire. There are records of millstone and blackband ironstone being quarried in Chell from at least the 13th century onwards. In 1831–32 Chell provided the stone for Christ Church, Tunstall. The main coal producing seam beneath Chell was the Winghay seam. The nearest workings were at Chatterley Whitfield, bordering Chell Heath, which was the first UK mine to produce more than 1 million tons of coal per annum. It closed in 1976, was declared a local nature reserve (part of Whitfield Valley nature reserve) in 1991 and a Scheduled Ancient Monument by English Heritage in 1993. Just to the west of the Chells, lay Wolstanton Colliery, which at 3197 ft once had Europe's deepest mine shaft. The Chell Colliery Company had shafts off Turnhurst Road, Great Chell and High Lane, Little Chell, both had ceased production by 1901.

== Community Profile and Facilities ==
The area is predominantly residential with a good mix of private, council, detached, semi-detached and terraced properties. There is a great deal of open space, with Victoria (Tunstall) Park, Sproson Park, Burslem Golf Course, Spring Bank Recreation Ground and Monks-Neil Park helping distance Chell from the urban area of Stoke-on-Trent to the south and east. To the north and west of Chell the land peters out into the open countryside and heathland of the Staffordshire Moorlands.

The area is home to two secondary schools; St Margaret Ward Catholic Academy in Little Chell and James Brindley Science College in Great Chell, which was replaced by Ormiston Horizon Academy in 2011 and relocated to new buildings in 2013. There are three primary schools; Mill Hill Primary, Whitfield Valley Primary and Burnwood Community Primary School. There is also the SEN Watermill School in Great Chell, opened in January 2014. It was formed from the merger of Middlehurst School and Heathfield Special School, and caters for 2-16yr olds.

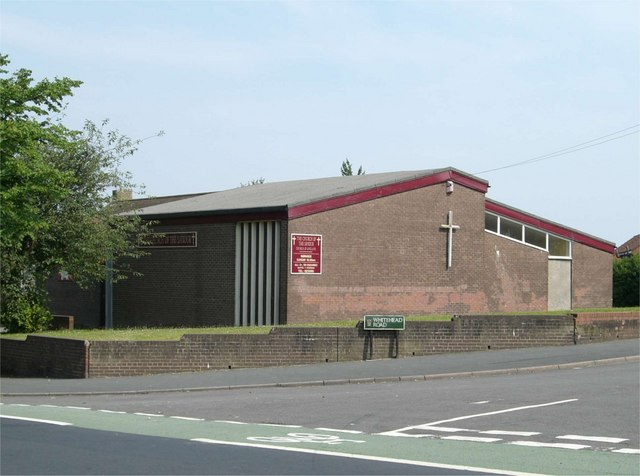
Church of the Saviour, Chell Heath

There are two Church of England churches; Chell Heath Church of the Saviour on Sprink Bank Road and St. Michael & All The Angels on St Michael's Road in Great Chell. In Great Chell there is a post office, small collection of shops, pharmacy, petrol station and pub on Biddulph Road, close to the roundabout with St Michael's Road. The New Horizons Sport and Leisure Centre, a partnership between the City Council and Orimiston Horizons Academy, is based on Uplands Avenue in Great Chell. There is also a small parade of shops on Chell Heath Road. The Vine, a rare Victorian (c.1875) backstreet local, is a grade II listed pub in the adjunct Pitts Hill area. The Sustrans National Cycle Routes 5 and 55 pass west and east of Chell respectively and help to delineate the extent of the area.

== Notable residents ==
- Robbie Williams (1974 – ), Take That and solo musician, was a student at St Margaret Ward Secondary School in Little Chell (that features on a new Robbie Williams tourist trail)
- Roy Smith (1910–1971), cricketer, died in Great Chell.
- Charlotte Rhead (1885–1947), the famous pottery designer, lived in Chell during the 1930s, a contemporary of Susie Cooper and Clarice Cliff, their collected art deco inspired works are highly sought after.
- Job Ridgway (1759–1814), one of the founder members of the Methodist New Connexion at Hanley, was born in Chell. He was a potter and became joint-owner of the Bell Pottery Works at Hanley. The Potteries Museum is now on the site. Later he became owner of the Cauldon Pottery Works at Hanley.
- James Brindley (1716–1772), lived at Turnhurst Hall, Great Chell, from 1765 to his death. He created experimental models of the lock systems he later implemented on the Trent and Mersey Canal in the grounds of the hall.
