= Whitfield Valley =

Nature reserve in Stoke-on-Trent, UK

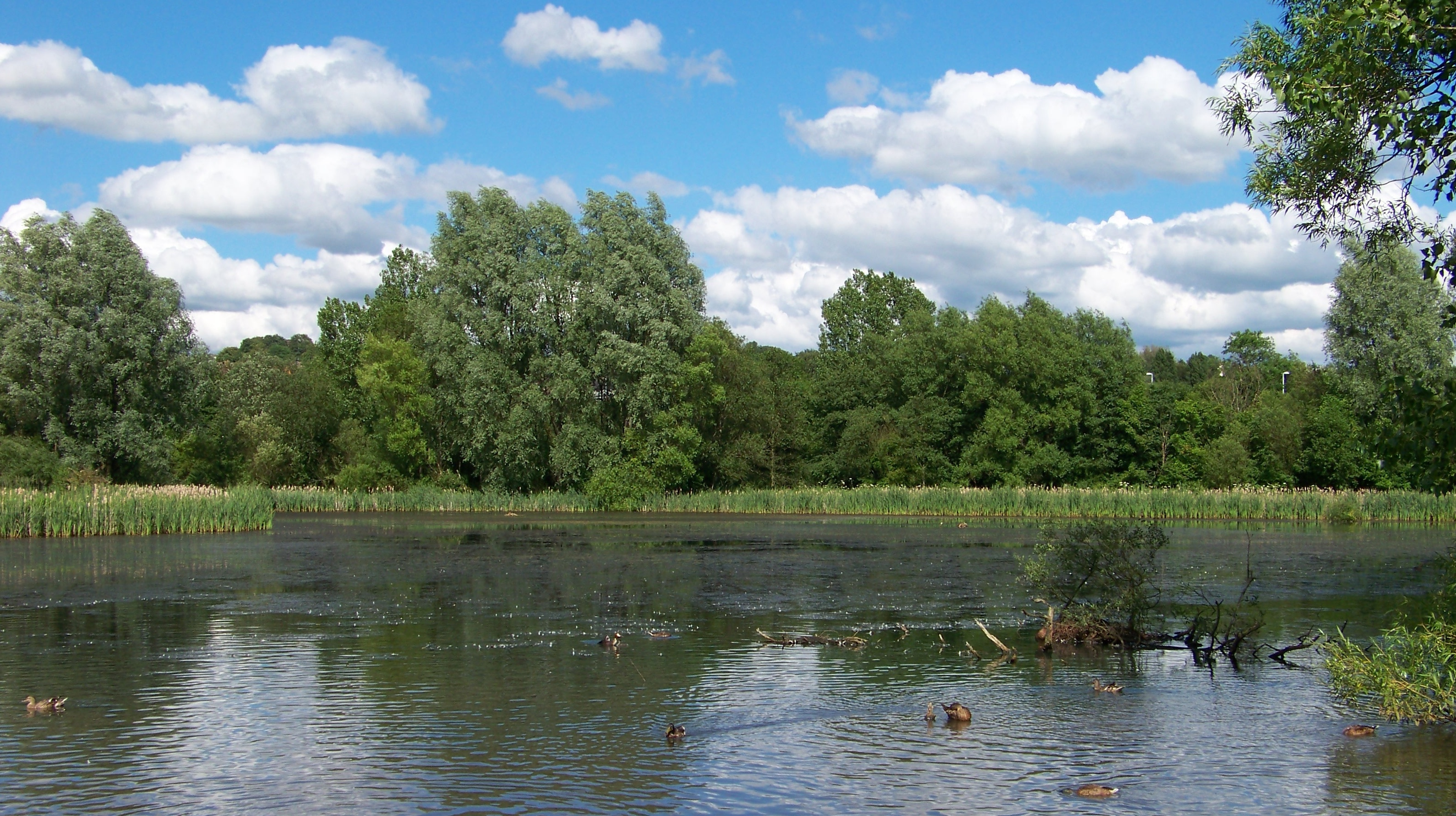
- The lake near Ford Green

- Location within Staffordshire
- Location: Stoke-on-Trent
- OS grid: SJ 884 520
- Coordinates: 53.0665°N 2.1742°W
- Area: 91.15 hectares (225.2 acres)
- Operator: Stoke-on-Trent City Council
- Designation: Local nature reserve
- Website: Whitfield Valley

Whitfield Valley is a local nature reserve on the northern fringe of Stoke-on-Trent, England.

== Description ==
The reserve, of area 91.15 hectares (225.2 acres), was designated a local nature reserve (LNR) in 1991. It is owned and managed by Stoke-on-Trent City Council.

Ford Green Brook flows south through the site, between Chell and Bradeley to the west and Norton le Moors to the east. At the northern end is the former spoil heap of the Chatterley Whitfield colliery; in the south is Ford Green. The reed bed at Ford Green is a Site of Special Scientific Interest.

Within the reserve there is grassland, heathland, lakes and scattered trees.

The former colliery spoil heap is a site for Birdsfoot trefoil, which supports dingy skipper butterflies. In the grassland, skylarks and grey partridges may be seen. The lakes are a habitat for water birds.
