= Colclough =

Colclough (variant Coleclough) is a surname of English origin. It is derived from a place called Cowclough in Whitworth, Lancashire.

Notable people with this surname include:

- Sir Adam Colclough, 1st Baronet (c.1590–1637) of the Colclough baronets
- Sir Caesar Colclough, 2nd Baronet (1624–1684), Member of Parliament for Newcastle-under-Lyme
- Sir Caesar Colclough, 3rd Baronet (c.1650–1687) of the Colclough baronets
- Caesar Colclough (died 1726), Member of Parliament for Taghmon
- Caesar Colclough (1696–1766), Member of Parliament for Wexford County
- Caesar Colclough (1754–1822), Chief Justice in Court of Appeal of Newfoundland and Labrador
- Caesar Colclough (1766–1842), Member of Parliament for Wexford County
- Christopher Colclough (1946–2017), British development economist and academic
- Craig Colclough, American opera singer
- Dave Colclough (1964–2016), Welsh poker player
- Ephraim Colclough (1875–1914), English footballer
- Graham Colclough (1883–1954), Australian rules footballer
- Horace Colclough (1888–1976), English footballer and manager
- Jim Colclough (1936–2004), American football player
- John Henry Colclough (c.1769–1798), Irish revolutionary
- Katie Colclough (born 1990), English cyclist
- Mary Ann Colclough (1836–1885), New Zealand feminist and social reformer
- Maurice Colclough (1953–2006), English rugby player
- Michael Colclough (born 1944), Church of England clergyman
- Pauline Adams (née Colclough; 1874–1957), Irish-American suffragist
- Phil Colclough (1940–2019), English folk singer and songwriter
- Ricardo Colclough (born 1983), American gridiron football player
- Ryan Colclough (born 1994), English footballer
- Tom Colclough, Canadian musician
- William Colclough (died c.1414), Member of Parliament for Newcastle-under-Lyme
