= Smallthorne Urban District =

Former local government district in Staffordshire, England

Coordinates: 53.045°N 2.171°W

- History
  - Created: 1894
  - Abolished: 1922
  - Succeeded by: Stoke-on-Trent (part)
- Status: Urban district

Smallthorne Urban District was an urban district in Staffordshire, England. It was initially formed of the Smallthorne civil parish. In 1904 the Chell and Milton civil parishes were added. It was abolished in 1922 with the bulk of it becoming part of the county borough of Stoke-on-Trent.

After absorption, the area of the UDC was divided into two wards for election of local councillors. Ward 27 covered Smallthorne, Bradeley, Norton-in-the-Moors, Ball Green, Fegg Hayes, and Brindley Ford. Ward 28 included Milton, Abbey Hulton and Bucknall.
