= Packmoor =

Village in Staffordshire, England

Coordinates: 53.08°N 02.21°W

- Location within Staffordshire
- OS grid reference: SJ8654
- District: Stoke-on-Trent
- Shire county: Staffordshire
- Region: West Midlands
- Country: England
- Sovereign state: United Kingdom
- Post town: Stoke-on-Trent
- Postcode district: ST7
- Dialling code: 01782
- Police: Staffordshire
- Fire: Staffordshire
- Ambulance: West Midlands
- UK Parliament: Stoke-on-Trent

Packmoor is a village on the northern edge of Stoke-on-Trent in Staffordshire, England. It is located between Kidsgrove and Chell.

== History ==
Packmoor consisted of farmhouses and farmland until the early 20th century. The first housing developments were terraced houses, built to support workers of the local Chatterley Whitfield mines. Many of these survive to the present day. Later housing developments include the large housing estate centred on Blackbird Way, which was built in 2002–2003.

The Potteries Loop Line previously ran along the outskirts of Packmoor. Decommissioned in 1964, a section on the edge of Packmoor was still in use for coal traffic until the mid-1970s.

Packmoor has a history of Primitive Methodism, which originated in the nearby village of Mow Cop. Their movement's church in the village, built in 1862, is still operating as a Methodist church today.

During his attempted uprising in 1745, the Jacobite pretender Bonnie Prince Charlie held prisoners at Lane Ends Farm located on the outskirts of the village.

== Geography ==
Located just to the south of the Pennines, Packmoor and surrounding areas are quite hilly and rich in coal deposits. It is close to the Staffordshire Moorlands, as well as the Cheshire Plain.

Scotia Brook, a tributary of Fowlea Brook (which is in turn a tributary of the River Trent), flows along the western flank of Packmoor. Parts of the watercourse run parallel the former Potteries Loop Line, which has now been converted into a public footpath.

== Infrastructure ==
The nearest major road is the A50, which runs through nearby Tunstall. The A500 and A34 are also close by. The closest motorway is the M6.

=== Public transport ===
Packmoor is served by 1–2 buses per hour by the number 7 route, operating between Hanley and Kidsgrove. Previously a First Potteries-only route, since 2023 it has been jointly operated by First and D&G Bus.

Kidsgrove railway station is the closest train station still in active use; it offers services to Stoke-on-Trent, Crewe, Derby, Manchester, Birmingham, and London. Previously, the village was served by Newchapel and Goldenhill railway station which stood along the demolished Potteries Loop Line.

=== Points of Interest ===
Packmoor has a primary school, a medical centre and pharmacy, two churches (one Methodist, one Catholic), a One Stop convenience store,3 football pitches and a community hall.

== Notable people ==
John Harold Rhodes VC WW1 Victoria Cross recipient.
