= John Harold Rhodes =

Recipient of the Victoria Cross

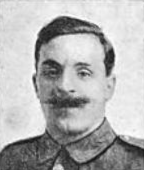
- Born: 17 May 1891; Packmoor, Staffordshire, England
- Died: 27 November 1917 (aged 26); Fontaine-Notre-Dame, France
- Burial place: Rocquigny-Equancourt Road British Cemetery, Manancourt
- Military career
- Allegiance: United Kingdom
- Branch: British Army
- Service years: 1910–1913; 1914–1917 †
- Rank: Lance Sergeant
- Service number: 15122
- Units: Grenadier Guards
- Conflicts: World War I
- Awards: Victoria Cross; Distinguished Conduct Medal & Bar

Lance Sergeant John Harold Rhodes VC DCM & Bar (17 May 1891 – 27 November 1917) was a British Army soldier and an English recipient of the Victoria Cross (VC), the highest and most prestigious award for gallantry in the face of the enemy that can be awarded to British and Commonwealth forces.

== Early life ==
Rhodes was born on 17 May 1891 in England in Packmoor, Stoke-on-Trent, Staffordshire, the son of an ex-soldier and miner, Ernie Rhodes. He was educated in Newchapel and later became a miner at the Chatterley Whitfield Colliery. Around 1910, however, he joined the Grenadier Guards of the British Army and served for three years, after which he returned to the colliery.

== First World War ==
On the outbreak of the First World War, John was recalled to the forces as a reservist. Now 26 years old, and a Lance-Sergeant in the 3rd Battalion, Grenadier Guards, British Army during the First World War John won the Distinguished Conduct Medal on 17 May 1915 and three months later was awarded a bar to this medal. While back in England recovering from his wounds, John married Lizzie but was not destined to live to see their son, John Rhodes (who, as an artilleryman, was himself awarded the Oak Leaves for gallantry in Northwestern Europe in 1944),

Back on the front-line, the following deed took place at the Battle of Poelcapelle for which John was awarded the VC and also the Croix De Guerre:

No. 15122 L./Sjt. John Harold Rhodes, G.Gds. (Tunstall, Staffs.).
For most conspicuous bravery when in charge of a Lewis gun section covering the consolidation of the right front company. He accounted for several enemy with his rifle as well as by Lewis gun fire, and, upon seeing three enemy leave a "pill-box", he went out single-handed through our own barrage and hostile machine-gun fire, and effected an entry into the "pill-box". He there captured nine enemy, including a forward observation officer connected by telephone with his battery. These prisoners he brought back with him, together with valuable information.

He was killed in action at Fontaine-Notre-Dame, France on 27 November 1917 and buried at Rocquigny-Equancourt Road British Cemetery, Manancourt.

== Medal ==
His Victoria Cross is displayed at The Guards Regimental Headquarters (Grenadier Guards RHQ) in Wellington Barracks, London, England.

A memorial plaque was unveiled at Chatterley Whitfield Mining Museum on 20 April 1984. There is also a road named in honour of John at nearby Tunstall. There is a memorial in Packmoor village on the Millennium Green outside Packmoor School which was unveiled in 2000.

== Bibliography ==
- Snelling, Stephen (2012) [1998]. Passchendaele 1917. VCs of the First World War. The History Press. ISBN 978-0752476667.
