= Norton le Moors =

Area of Stoke-on-Trent, England

Coordinates: 53.06°N 2.163°W

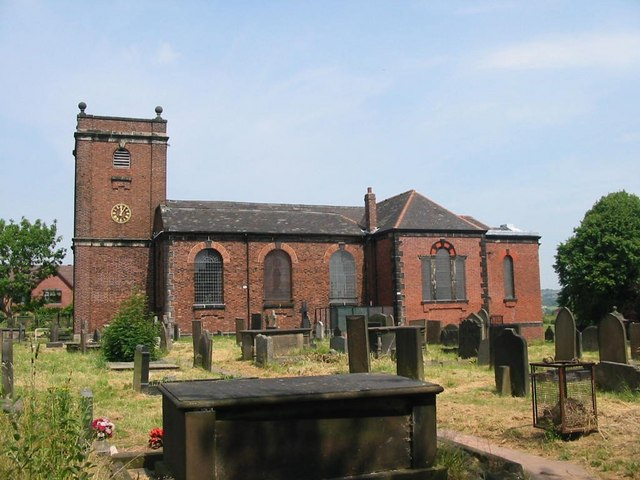
- St Bartholomew's Church, Norton le Moors

- Location within Staffordshire
- Population: 11,157
- OS grid reference: SJ8907751462
- Unitary authority: Stoke-on-Trent
- Shire county: Staffordshire
- Region: West Midlands
- Country: England
- Sovereign state: United Kingdom
- Postcode district: ST6
- Police: Staffordshire
- Fire: Staffordshire
- Ambulance: West Midlands
- UK Parliament: Staffordshire

Norton le Moors is in the north-east of the city of Stoke-on-Trent, in the ceremonial county of Staffordshire, England, mostly within the city boundary, with the rest in the Staffordshire Moorlands district.

== Geography ==
The suburb borders Ball Green in the north, Stockton Brook in the east, Norton Green in the north-east, Milton in the south, and Bradeley in the west.

== History ==
In 1961 the parish had a population of 9000. On 1 April 1965 the parish was abolished and merged with Bagnall, Brown Edge and Stoke-on-Trent. Two years, later Norton Parish Council obtained permission to change its name to Brown Edge Parish Council. Norton le Moors appears in the Domesday Book of 1086 as Nortone, meaning North town. At the time of the Domesday Survey the village was held by Robert de Stafford. During the Middle Ages the area developed due to its location on the road from Leek to Burslem, later turned turnpiked as the Leek to Newcastle road.

=== Population ===
In 2001, the population for the ward of Norton and Bradeley stood at 11,157. However, the population for Norton le Moors itself has significantly changed over time. The UK national census revealed that in 1801 the total population for the parish was 1,480 and up until 1891 the population continued to increase. In 1901 the population of the parish had dropped from 9,919 in 1891 to 4,600, a drop of 5,319 people. The population started to increase again for the next 20 years until there was a decline in 1931. Since then the population has been steadily increasing.

Population data from 1801 to 1961
Year	Population 20 years earlier	Population 10 years earlier	Current Total Population
1801	–	–	1480
1811	–	1480	1761
1821	–	1761	1983
1831	–	1983	2407
1841	–	2407	2891
1851	–	2891	3327
1881	–	6902	8870
1891	–	8870	9919
1901	–	3692	4600
1911	–	4600	5299
1921	–	5299	5910
1931	–	3903	4462
1951	4462	–	6132
1961	–	6132	9000

Figures from the 2001 census show that the ward for Norton and Bradeley have 38.89% of economically active between the ages of 16–74 in full-time employment, 10.83% in part-time employment and 17.37% are retired.

=== Occupations ===
Statistics from the 1881 census data shows that the vast majority of employment and industry was in various mineral substances, which mainly employed men, however women were also employed although in small numbers. Although occupation figures for women were mainly unknown in 1881, the top occupation was in the domestic service or offices sector.

== Church of St Bartholomew ==
Norton le Moors' most noticeable landmark is the Church of St Bartholomew, on Norton Lane. Built in 1737 (although significantly rebuilt in 1915), the brick and stone parish church was built by Richard Trubshaw. The church of 1737 forms the western end of the present building. The building was doubled in size when the eastern half was added in 1915. To this day it remains as one of the oldest surviving buildings in the Staffordshire Potteries. The church's location perched on top of a hill makes for expansive views out towards neighbouring areas such as Smallthorne and Burslem to the west as well as views to the Staffordshire Moorlands in the south and the Peak District beyond to the east making for an attractive location.

== Norton Gateway Memorial ==
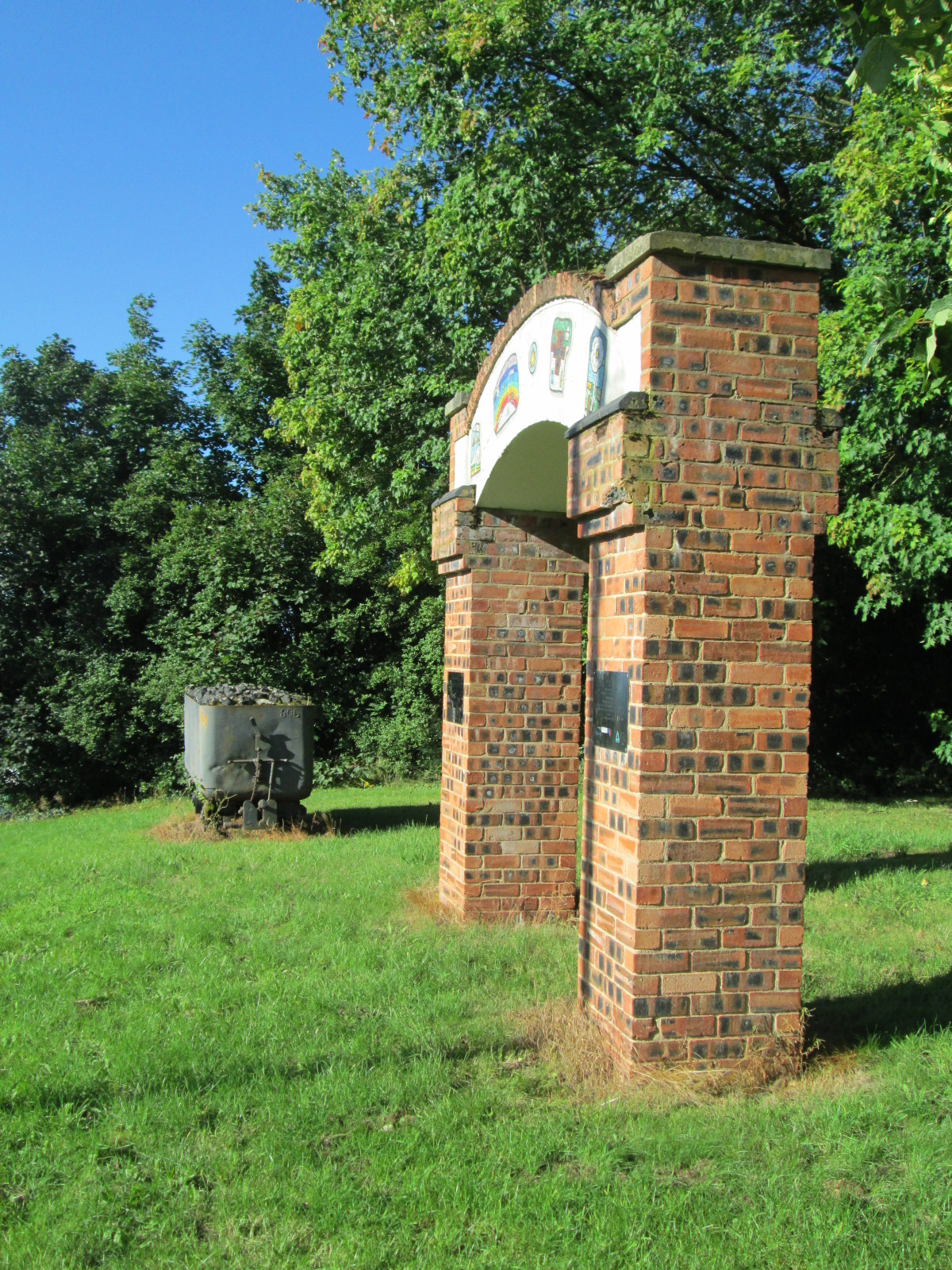
The Norton Gateway Memorial

The "Gateway of Norton le Moors", on the corner of Ford Green Road and Knypersley Road, is dedicated to the men, women and children who worked in the mining and ceramics industries. It was opened by the Lord Mayor, Councillor Jean Edwards, on 29 September 2006. Three coal wagons are placed nearby. The memorial is situated opposite the Norton Arms, where the inquiry into the explosion at Chatterley Whitfield Colliery in 1881 was held.

The gateway bears a plaque in recognition of Walter Sylvester, the local inventor of a device for safely removing pit props in mines.

== Education ==
Location in the north of Stoke-on-Trent Excel Academy has a catchment from the neighbourhoods of Norton-le-Moors, Sneyd Green, Milton, Baddeley Green and Ball Green. Established in 1963 to accommodate 450 pupils the school has enlarged and established over the years and now accommodates over 1200 pupils aged 11–16.

== Transport ==
Norton le Moors is accessible through a range of lanes such as Norton Lane, Endon Road and Knypersley Road. The main road that runs parallel to the village is Leek New Road (A53) which leads to Newcastle-under-Lyme and Leek.

== Sport ==
The local Football League team is Port Vale F.C. but a minority support their arch rivals Stoke City who got promoted to the Premier League in 2008 and remained in the top division until 2018 when they were relegated to the Championship again. The area is represented in non-league football by Norton United F.C., although the club's ground is in fact located in the neighbouring suburb of Smallthorne.
