= Walter Sylvester =

English inventor

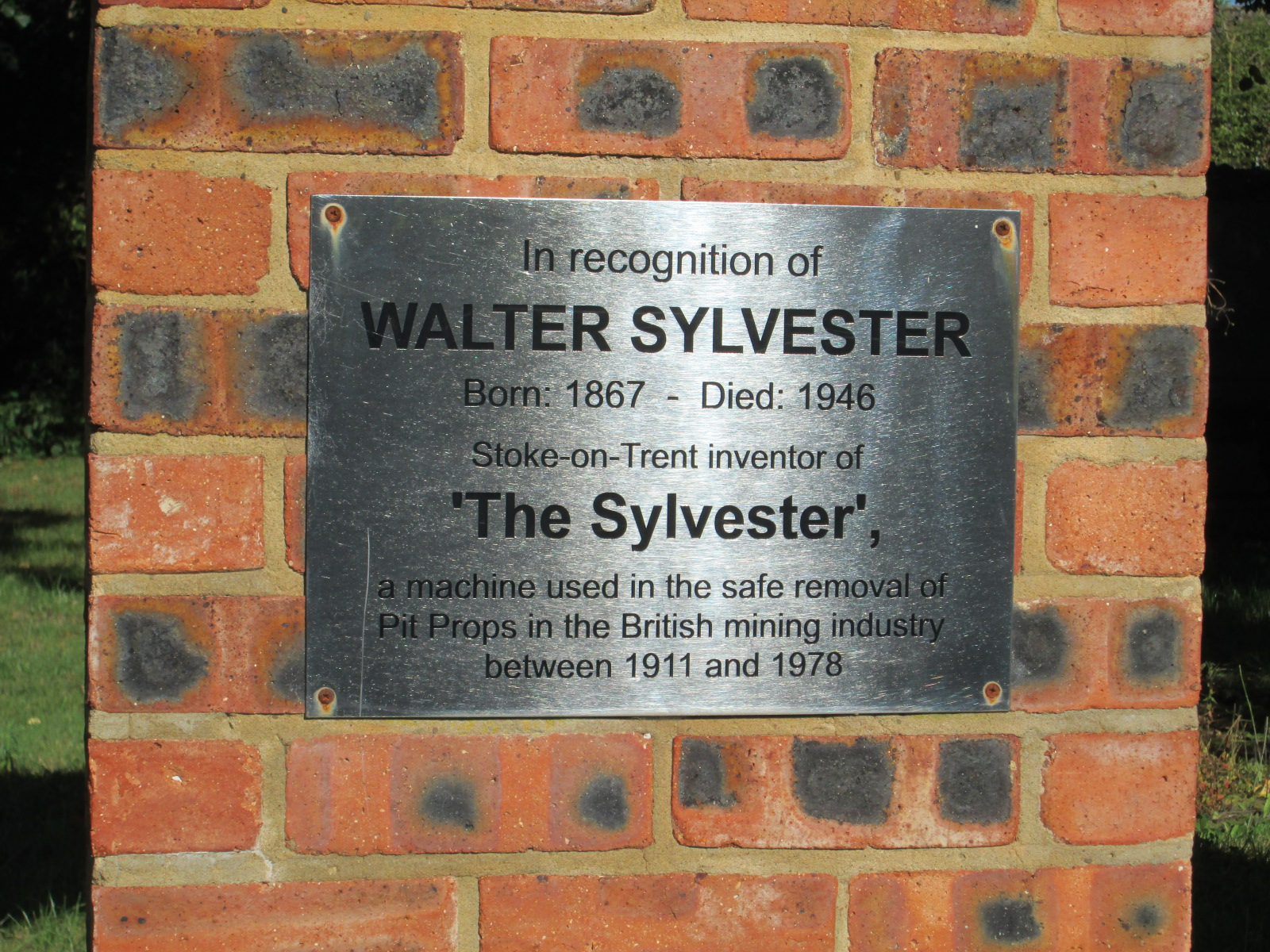
Plaque dedicated to Sylvester

Walter Sylvester (18 December 1867 – 30 October 1944) was an English inventor, known for the "Sylvester", a device for safely removing pit props in mines.

== Life ==
Sylvester was born in 1867 in Newbold, Derbyshire; his father was a coal miner. The family later moved to Fegg Hayes in north Staffordshire, and Walter was a clerk at Chatterley Whitfield colliery.

In 1895 he patented a device (Patent no. 9396, dated 13 May 1895) for the safe removal of pit props from tunnels in mines. During longwall mining, wooden pit props were recovered for re-use as the coal face moved forward; this was done by knocking them out with a hammer, which was a hazardous operation. Using Sylvester's device, the prop could be removed from a place of safety.

The invention consisted of a "sword", box, chain and handle: the box held a ratchet, by which the "sword" (a toothed rack) was pulled in one direction. The chain, attached to the sword, was fixed to the pit prop.

It was known locally in north Staffordshire as a "Walter". It became widely used in mining; as well as for removing props, it was used for pulling derailed wagons back onto tracks. In 1911 it was made mandatory to use them in coal mines in Britain.

Sylvester left his job at Chatterley Whitfield and manufactured the device; he had a workshop in Tunstall, Staffordshire. He designed and manufactured other inventions, mostly for use in mining, and he continued to patent his devices into the 1940s. Inventions included haulage clips, chain couplings, roof supports, brackets for pit props, and collapsible pit props.

Sylvester died in 1944, and was buried in Tunstall cemetery. He was survived by his wife Agnes née Worthington, whom he married in 1900, and by their son and three daughters.

The Sylvester device was eventually banned by the Coal Board in 1978, as modern techniques made it unnecessary, and it could be dangerous if used improperly.

== Plaque ==
In 2010, 100 years after the Federation of Stoke-on-Trent, a plaque was unveiled at the Norton Gateway Memorial at Norton le Moors, in recognition of Walter Sylvester.
