= Ford Green Brook =

Stream in Staffordshire, England

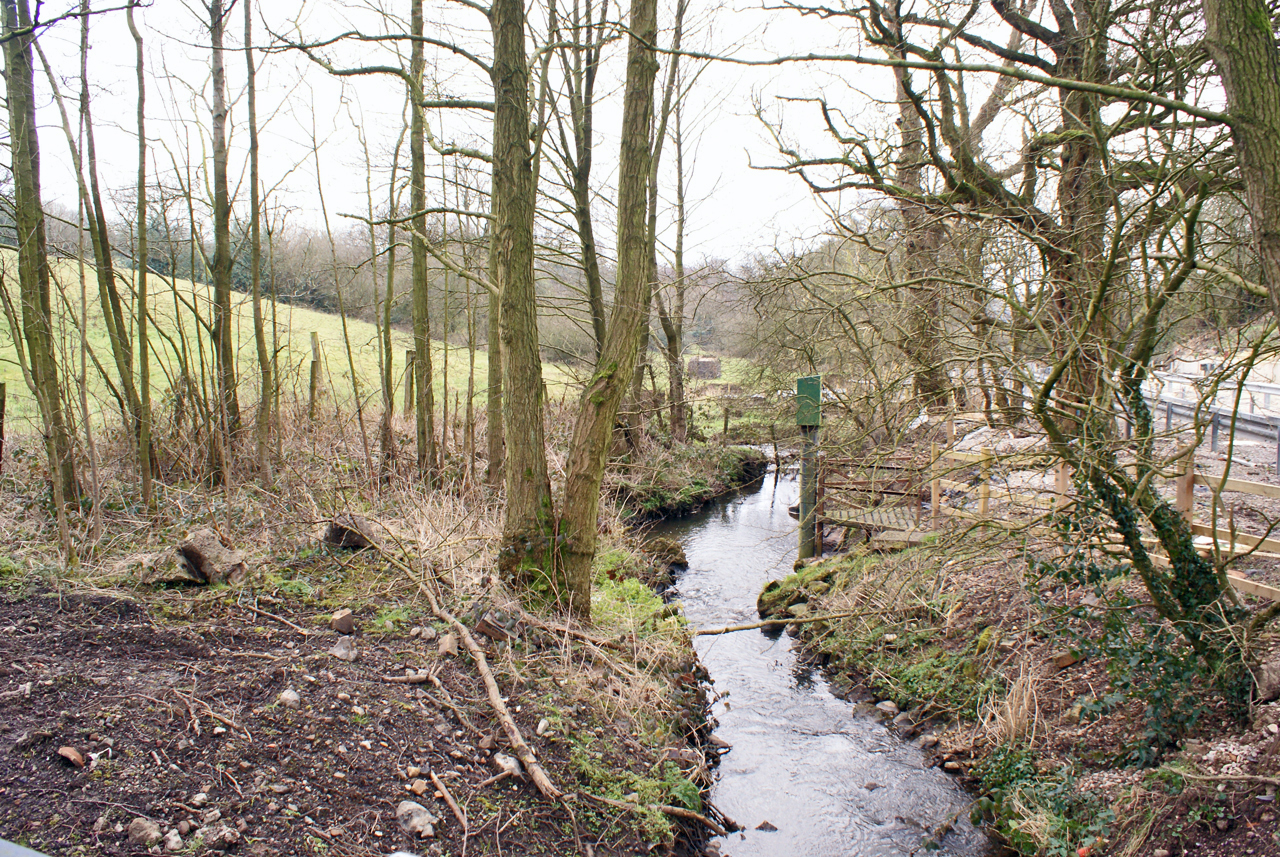
- Ford Green Brook near Brindley Ford

- Ford Green brook within Staffordshire
- Nickname: Banky Brook

Location
- Country: England
- Counties: Staffordshire

Physical characteristics
- Source
  - location: Mow Cop
- Mouth
  - location: Milton, Staffordshire
  - coordinates: 53.0442°N 2.1453°W
- Length: 10 km (6.2 mi)
- Basin size: 15 km^{2} (5.8 sq mi)
- Progression : Ford Green Brook—Trent—Humber

Ford Green Brook flows through Staffordshire and the outlying areas of Stoke-on-Trent, England. It is the first named tributary stream of the River Trent, and is 6.2 miles (10 km) long.

== Course and catchment ==
Its source is below Mow Cop, on the flank of the gritstone edge on which the village is located. The brook flows south-east in a narrow valley, through Brindley Ford and then into conurbation of Stoke-on-Trent. It passes through the site of the disused Chatterley Whitfield colliery, where it was once culverted, and then flows between Bradeley and Norton-in-the-moors to Ford Green. The brook then flows to the east of Smallthorne, and Sneyd Green where it passes beneath the Caldon Canal, joining the Trent near Milton, Staffordshire.

The catchment, which lies between that of the Head of Trent to the north and east, and that of the Scotia brook to the south and west, has an area of 15 square kilometres (5.8 mi^{2}). Ford Green valley was at one time the location for heavy industry, with local collieries such as the Chatterley-Whitfield, supplying coal to the Ford Green ironworks.

In their place, a number of parks and wildlife sites have now been created linked together by a cycle route. These include the Chatterley-Whitfield heritage park, the Whitfield Valley nature reserve, and Holden Lane pools.

== Banky Brook ==
Banky Brook was the traditional name given to the stream as it passed through Stoke. It was a popular place for local children to play in the past. A street in the nearby village of Bradeley is named Banky Brook Close.

== Floods ==
In August 1987, following intense rainfall, the brook overflowed and flooded the 16th century Ford Green Hall an historic house museum. The floods reached a depth of 4–5 feet within the house and antique furniture was seen floating through the lower rooms. The damage caused by the storm meant that the hall had to close for two years whilst it was renovated and repaired.

== Wildlife and ecology ==
Ford Green brook has been classed as having poor ecological quality under the Water Framework Directive. This is one of the lower bands in the five part framework scale, which ranges from high, good, and moderate, through to poor and finally bad.

Despite the low ecological classification, sites along the brook support a variety of flora and fauna, including water voles, grass snakes, and dragonflies. The Ford Green reed bed, at the lower end of Whitfield Valley nature reserve, has been designated as a Site of Special Scientific Interest. This is because substantial flocks of swallows Hirundo rustica congregate here before migrating for the winter.
