= Albert Prince (footballer) =

English footballer

Albert James Prince (12th November 1887 – unknown) was an English footballer who played as a forward. Born in Smallthorne, Staffordshire, he played for Manchester United and Stafford Rangers.

== Personal life ==
Prince served as a bombardier in the Royal Garrison Artillery during the First World War.
