= Excel Academy, Stoke-on-Trent =

Excel Academy

Location
- Milton Road; Sneyd Green; Stoke-on-Trent, Staffordshire, ST1 6LG; England; 53°02′46″N 2°09′27″W

Information
- Type: Academy
- Established: 1963
- Department for Education URN: 140633 Tables
- Ofsted: Reports
- Principal: Anna Steele
- Staff: Approx. 75 (full time equivalent) teaching staff and 20+ non-teaching staff
- Gender: Mixed
- Age: 11 to 16
- Website: http://www.excelacademy.info/

Excel Academy (formerly Holden Lane High School) is a mixed secondary school located in Sneyd Green, Stoke on Trent, England. It was established in 1963 and educates pupils of ages 11–16.

Situated in the north of Stoke-on-Trent, the school has a catchment from the neighbourhoods of Sneyd Green, Milton, Baddeley Green, Norton-in-the-Moors, and Ball Green. The socio-economic circumstances of the area the school serves are below average. The vast majority of students are White British. The academy is the school of choice for an increasing number of parents/carers and is over subscribed.

== Specialist school and academy status ==
Holden Lane High School became a specialist Sports College in 2001 and became a hub for the development of P.E. and school sport for both secondary and primary schools in the north of the city.

The school converted to with academy status in March 2014 and was renamed Excel Academy. The school is part of the College Academies Trust, sponsored by Stoke-on-Trent College. Other schools in the trust include Discovery Academy, Maple Court Academy and Stoke Studio College.

== Ofsted Inspections ==
An Ofsted inspection in May 2011 rated Holden Lane High School as 'inadequate' and as a result the school was placed into special measures. A follow-up inspection in June 2012 rated the school as 'satisfactory'.

An Ofsted inspection in October 2013 rated Holden Lane High School as 'Good', allowing the school to convert to academy status.

An Ofsted visit in November 2016 decided that The Excel Academy is still a Good Academy.

== Academic standards ==
In 2010 the school achieved GCSE examination performance of 89 per cent of pupils obtaining 5 or more GCSEs at the higher grades of 'A star' to 'C' (5A*-C), and 55% of pupils obtaining 5 or more GCSEs at the higher grades of A*-C including English and Maths. This latter figure exceeds the 'Fisher Family Trust' measure FFT D, which indicates the progress made by schools in the top 25% percentile of value-added scores nationally.

In 2009 the school's achieved 75% 5A*-C and 43% 5A*-C including English and Maths. In 2011 Holden lane achieved 87% (5A*-C)in their GCSE Results.

== School Leadership & Management ==
The Principal is Miss Anna Steele. Anna has been the principal since 2022. Initially in 1963 the Head was Mr Taylor with Miss Young as deputy head. For 17 years, the school was led by Mr. D. Gray. He retired in July 1996. Mr. P. Roberts, Deputy Headteacher, became Acting Headteacher for one term prior to Lynne Hardcastle's appointment in January 1997. Mrs. Hardcastle took early retirement in July 2006. She was succeeded by her Deputy, Mrs. Jacqueline Lewis. Mrs. Lewis served the school in various capacities from September 1972 and was Acting Head until May 2011. Mr J Patino was headteacher from 2011 to 2015. He was extremely successful and eventually became Executive Principal of the College Academies Trust which sponsored the Excel Academy. Mr Darren Bishop was the principal until 2022 when he retired and Miss Steele became acting head before she was given the permanent job.

== 'Feeder' Primary Schools & 'Cluster' Secondary Schools ==
Pupils at the school are drawn largely from Norton, Milton, Hillside, Sneyd Green, Ball Green and Holden Lane Primary Schools, with lesser numbers coming from Newford (Smallthorne) and Greenways Schools.

== Notable former pupils ==
=== Holden Lane High School ===
- Famous Performer Jonathan Wilkes attended the school. Wilkes is famous for being in multiple pantomime performances including Snow White, Cinderella and Aladdin. He also presented Stokes' Got Talent at the Regent Theatre and has appeared on programmes such as The Paul O'Grady Show, BBC Radio 1 and was captain of ITV's Celebrity Soccer Aid in 2008.
- Professional footballer Anthony Malbon attended the school from 2003 to 2008.
- professional footballer Tom Pope
