= Roy Smith (cricketer, born 1910) =

English cricketer (1910–1971)

Personal information
- Full name: Roy Smith
- Born: 20 January 1910; Stoke-on-Trent, Staffordshire, England
- Died: 19 October 1971 (aged 61); Great Chell, Staffordshire, England
- Batting: Right-handed

Domestic team information
- Years: Team
- 1949: Minor Counties
- 1931–1954: Staffordshire

Career statistics
Competition	First-class
Matches	1
Runs scored	29
Batting average	14.50
100s/50s	–/–
Top score	29
Balls bowled	–
Wickets	–
Bowling average	–
5 wickets in innings	–
10 wickets in match	–
Best bowling	–
Catches/stumpings	1/–
- Source: Cricinfo, 29 November 2011

Roy Smith (20 January 1910 – 19 October 1971) was an English cricketer. Smith was a right-handed batsman. He was born at Stoke-on-Trent, Staffordshire.

Smith made his debut for Staffordshire in the 1931 Minor Counties Championship against Durham. Smith played Minor counties cricket for Staffordshire from 1931 to 1954 (excluding the six seasons in which there was no county cricket due to World War II), making 98 appearances. In 1949, he made a single first-class appearance for a combined Minor Counties team against Yorkshire at Lord's. In the Minor Counties first-innings, he was dismissed for 29 runs by Allan Mason, while in their second-innings he was dismissed for a duck by Fred Trueman. Yorkshire won the match by 136 runs.

He died at Great Chell, Staffordshire on 19 October 1971. He had a brother and nephew who both played for Staffordshire.
