= Smallthorne =

Area of Stoke-on-Trent, England

Coordinates: 53.0516°N 2.1733°W

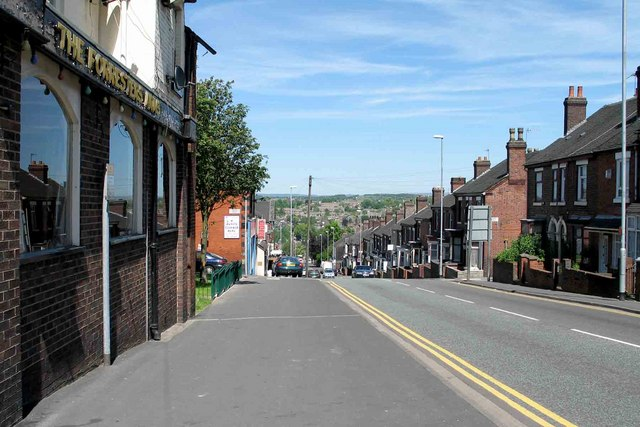
- Ford Green Road

- Location within Staffordshire
- Population: 5,827 (2011 Census. Ward Ford Green and Smallthorne)
- OS grid reference: SJ884504
- Unitary authority: Stoke-on-Trent
- Ceremonial county: Staffordshire
- Region: West Midlands
- Country: England
- Sovereign state: United Kingdom
- Post town: STOKE-ON-TRENT
- Postcode district: ST6
- Dialling code: 01782
- Police: Staffordshire
- Fire: Staffordshire
- Ambulance: West Midlands
- UK Parliament: Stoke-on-Trent North

Smallthorne (population: 5,827 – 2011 Census) is an area in the city of Stoke-on-Trent in Staffordshire, England. It is in the north-east of the city, near Burslem. Smallthorne borders Bradeley and Chell in the north, Norton-in-the-Moors in the east, Sneyd Green in the south, and Burslem in the west.

== History ==
=== Administration ===
Although all of Smallthorne falls comfortably within Stoke-on-Trent North parliamentary constituency, for local government purposes it was split between two different electoral wards: Burslem North and East Valley. The part of Smallthorne that falls within East Valley is sometimes referred to as New Ford and has an active Residents Association of the same name. The Burslem North part of Smallthorne also has an active Community Group called A Better Smallthorne and Julie Walton is the current chair. In 2011 Smallthorne was united and became a single ward and in 2015 one Councillor was elected who was Candi Chetwynd, the Labour Party candidate, she took over from Matt Wilcox.

For 115 years Smallthorne was administratively separate from Stoke-on-Trent. From 1807 to 1894, Smallthorne (and Ford Green), along with Bemersley, Norton, Norton Green, and Milton, was part of the Norton-in-the-Moors Parish. An Act of Parliament, entitled 'An Act for separating the Chapelries and Chapels of Newcastle-under-Lyme, Burslem, Whitmore, Bucknall-cum-Bagnall and Norton-in-the-Moors, from the Rectory and Parish Church of Stoke-upon-Trent, and for making them five district rectories', was passed in 1807. For Poor Law purposes, the parish became part of Leek Union in 1834. A visitor in the 1850s observed that "the whole parish is a cold and hilly country, abounding in coal, which is got at various depths, in beds from four to seven feet thick".

Smallthorne was formerly a chapelry in the parish of Norton-in-the-Moors, on 31 December 1894 Smallthorne became a separate civil parish, on 1 April 1922 the parish was abolished and merged with Stoke on Trent. In 1921 the parish had a population of 7726. Smallthorne was from 1894 to 1922 part of the Smallthorne Urban District. In 1922 the urban district was wound up, with the bulk of it becoming part of the county borough of Stoke-on-Trent.

The building that once served as the council HQ is still in existence and can be found near Smallthorne Cemetery. The HQ acted as a clinic then became a public library before that closed in the early 1990s. It now serves as an undertakers' premises. The Smallthorne Urban District Council crest can be seen on this building still but bears the words Smallthorne Burial Board.

One interesting side effect of the fact that the Potteries' six towns and Smallthorne were administratively separate was the duplication of many street names. This led to significant confusion after unification. Thus, in the early 1950s a large number of streets had to be renamed. In Smallthorne twenty streets were given new names, including Ford Green Road (formerly Leek Road), Coseley Street (formerly Edward Street) and Preston Street (formerly Wedgwood Street). The actual date for the name changes in Smallthorne can be found in several documents and is shown to be 27 August 1951.

=== Industry ===
Today, there is virtually no sign of heavy industry in Smallthorne but this is a relatively recent development. The district used to be criss-crossed by a canal and numerous mineral lines servicing five collieries – Cornhill, Holden Lane, Intake, Norton and Pinfold; the Ford Green Ironworks; a forge; and a chain, cable and anchor works. These lines joined the main Biddulph Valley Line near Ford Green Hall. The Foxley, a branch of the Caldon Canal, itself a branch of the Trent and Mersey Canal, fell into complete disuse with the arrival of the railways and its remains have almost all been obliterated over time.

The Biddulph Valley Line, later part of the North Staffordshire Railway, was opened in 1859 and a passenger station called 'Ford Green and Smallthorne' began service in 1864. Passenger services between Stoke and Biddulph ceased in 1927 but some special excursion trains continued until 1962. With the decline of the heavy industries all along the route, the line was gradually downgraded until the last section between Ford Green and Milton Junction closed in 1977 (when Norton Colliery closed).

Until the late 1970s Smallthorne was a coal mining area. In the mid-1960s there were three large collieries, Norton (Ford Green), Sneyd (Burslem) and Hanley Deep Pit, within a mile or less of 'Smallthorne Bank' (the main shopping area today) and a number of others were within an easy commuting distance. One of the many workingmen's clubs scattered throughout the surrounding district is still called the Norton Miners Welfare Institute and Cricket Club and is located off Community Drive in Smallthorne.

=== St. Saviours Church ===
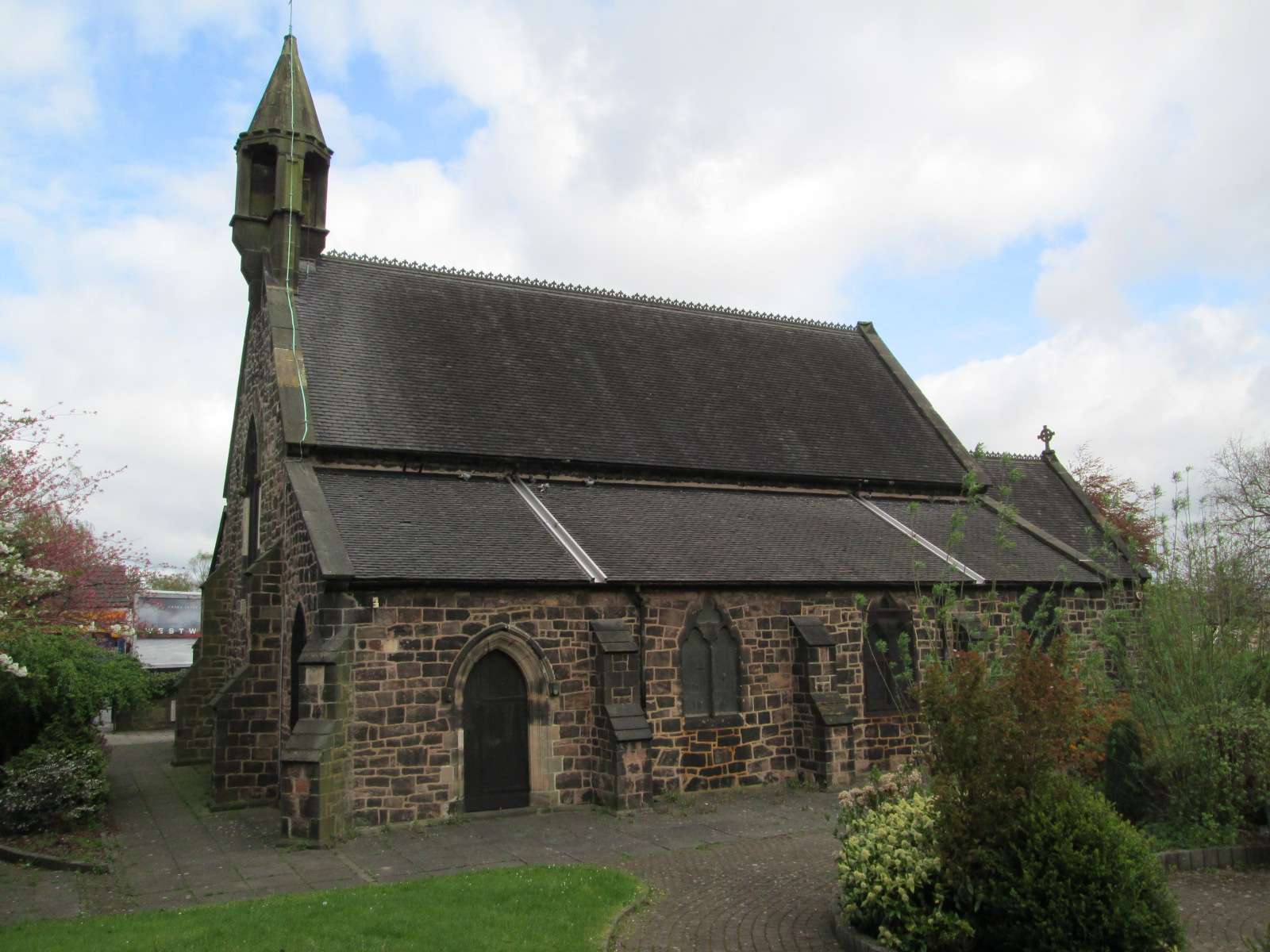
St Saviour's Church

In 1850 fewer than 2000 people lived in Smallthorne and the area was part of the rural parish of Norton in the Moors. People worked in the mines owned by Lord Norton or the ironworks owned by Robert Heath. St Bartholomew's, Norton was too small to serve the growing population and Lord Norton donated a land and money for a church. He also donated land for a church school, endowed the Minister with £80 a year and, in 1851, gave a site valued at £400 for a vicarage. The new church building at Smallthorne was still too small. In 1885 Robert Heath added the South Aisle and North transept at a cost of £1000. By the early 1990s, the church building was nearly 150 years old and showing its age. The church council and congregation took the opportunity to carry out extensive restoration work.

=== Primitive Methodism ===
One of the Smallthorne streets off Ford Green Road is called 'Primitive Street'. For a hundred years or more, it contained two complete rows of unspectacular terraced housing. Those houses are now demolished and the area has been partially redeveloped. The street's significance lies in its name.

'Primitive Street' is named after Primitive Methodism, which, in the mid nineteenth century, was an influential Protestant Christian movement. There was a Primitive Methodist Chapel close by in Sangster Lane, as well as Victoria Methodist (recently demolished after a fire) and Salem Methodist. There were numerous such chapels throughout the North Staffordshire coalfield until, in 1932, the three main Methodist groups in Britain, the Wesleyans, Primitive Methodists and United Methodists came together to form the present Methodist Church. In recent years many have closed and now only one, Salem Methodist, remains in Smallthorne. Built in 1874, it was restored in 2010 after funds were raised and grants received to enable the building to meet the laws for disability access.

Primitive Methodism was founded by two Stoke-on-Trent Christian converts: Bucknall-born Hugh Bourne (1772–1852) and Burslem-born William Clowes (1780–1851). Bourne, and his supporters, were originally known as 'Camp Meeting Methodists' because they organised large open-air meetings for preaching, prayer and the public declaration of sin. From a vantage point on Chetwynd Street, outside Smallthorne Primary School, you can see three important places in the early history of the movement: Mow Cop, the site of the first two Camp Meetings on Sunday 31 May 1807 and 19 July; Norton-in-the-Moors, the location of the third Camp Meeting on 23 August 1807; and Chatterley Whitfield Colliery winding gear and spoil heap behind which can be found the small former mining village of Bemersley, where Hugh Bourne lived and died. In 1907 the Primitive Methodists celebrated their centenary with a new Camp Meeting at Mow Cop that attracted around 100,000 people.

Primitive Methodists were popularly nicknamed 'Ranters' because of their tendency to sing hymns in the street. Before the age of state education, many of Smallthorne's children would have received their elementary education from 'Ranters' in Primitive Methodist Sunday Schools.

=== St Mary's Church ===
A chapel was opened at St Mary's Roman Catholic school in Queen Street (now Brierley Street), Smallthorne, in 1875. It was served from St. Peter's, Cobridge, until 1895 when it was transferred to the new Burslem mission. A mission including Burslem, Smallthorne, and Wolstanton was formed out of the Cobridge mission in 1895 with the assistant priest from Cobridge as resident priest. Smallthorne became a separate parish in 1923 there has been a resident priest since then and the Roman Catholic population of the parish has remained at about 600 since the late 1920s.

A then new building was built in 1905, it was situated between Queen Street (now Brierley Street) and Lord Street although the terraces above and below were probably not there until after 1909. There is a date stone on the Brierley Street side of the building showing 1905. The other boundaries were Camp Road to the south west and what would be Edward Street (now Coseley Street) to the north east.

The last marriage at the Smallthorne site was in 1968 with the new site at Norton opening in 1969. The new St Mary's with a separate Church and School is situated on Ford Green Road at Norton opposite Spragg House Lane.

== Demographics ==
Smallthorne has a large elderly population, twice the city's average. Nearly a third of its residents live in council housing and there is an even larger proportion in terraced housing (Source: 2001 Census). According to the council's Neighbourhood Area Profile (July 2006), Smallthorne "is typified by large areas of privately-owned terraced housing and significant areas of semi-detached council-housing". The average gross household income of Smallthorne residents is lower than the city's average but there are ten other neighbourhoods in the City that are poorer (Source: CACI Ltd). Social housing in the area is usually very sought after and private house prices are buoyant.

== Present day ==
The hub of the community is around the junction of Ford Green Road, known locally as 'Smallthorne Bank', and Community Drive. Here can be found a community hall, an NHS health centre, a chemist, a sub-post office, a number of other shops, a restaurant, an Oatcake shop and take-aways.

Smallthorne's community hall was one of only twelve council-owned, community-run halls in the city. Today, many of these Halls are social enterprises owned by local Trusts. In addition to its community hall, Smallthorne has two churches [Saint Saviours Church of England Parish and Salem Methodist Chapel – part of the Stoke-on-Trent (Burslem) Circuit of the Methodist Church] and two primary schools (Smallthorne and New Ford). Both primary schools are 'feeder schools' for Haywood Engineering College in Burslem, with a significant minority of pupils choosing to attend Excel Academy in Sneyd Green or St. Margaret Ward's Catholic High School and Performing Arts College in Tunstall.

There are six public houses in Smallthorne The Forrester's Arms (Last Orders), The White Hart (The Barrel), The Kings Head (nickname Scrimmies), the Green Star, The Ford (historically The Railway Hotel) was converted to flats and the Swan Inn which was recently converted into two maisonettes (170 and 170A Ford Green Road) and three Workingmen's Clubs (Norton Miners Institute, the Pioneer WMC and Institute on Chetwynd Street and the Victory WMC and Institute on Hanley Road – a member of the Working Men's Club and Institute Union). Smallthorne once had an abundance of public houses many of which have been demolished or converted.

== Landmarks ==
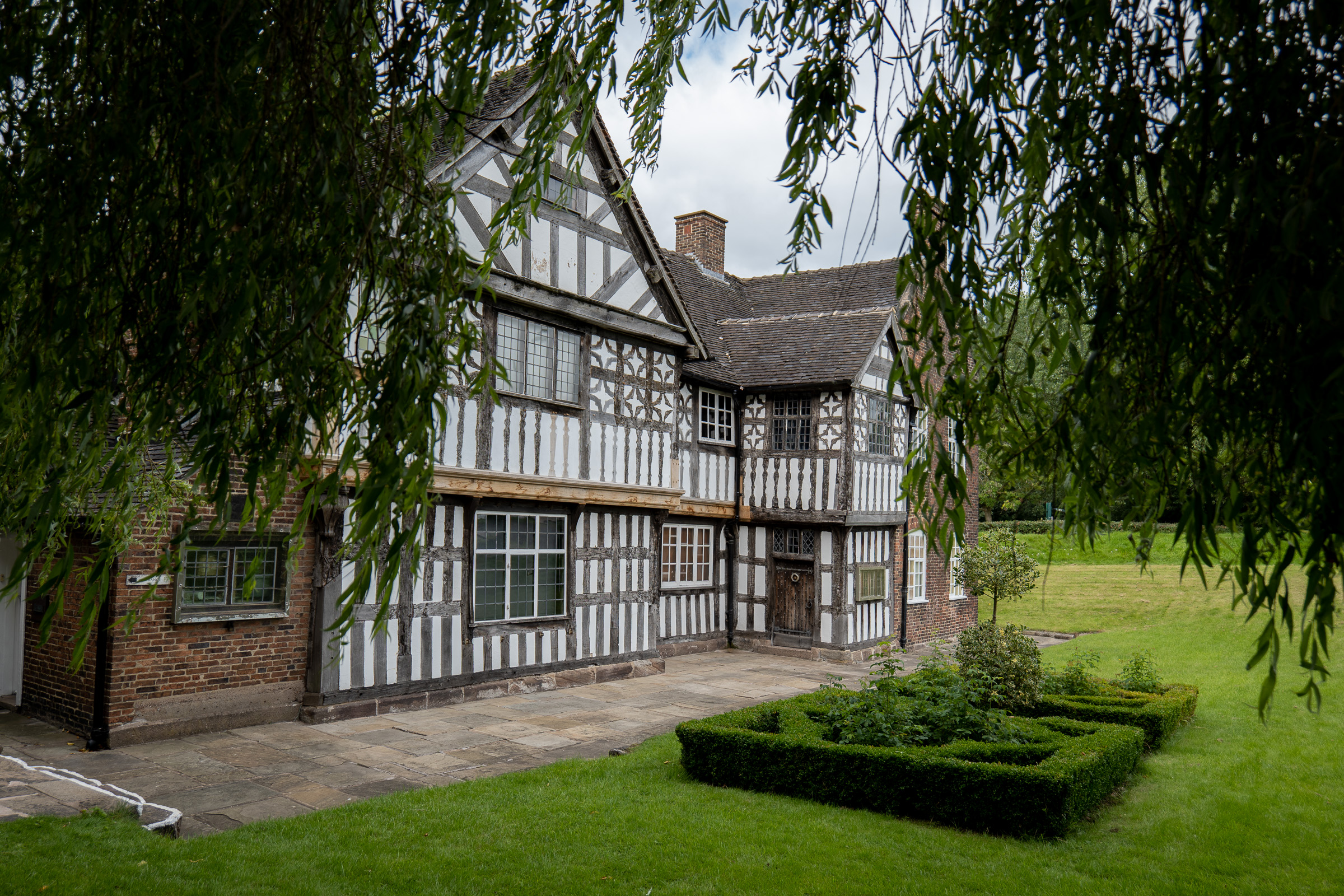
Ford Green Hall

Ford Green Hall is a farmhouse originally built in 1624. It stands on land adjacent to the B5051 minor road in the east of Smallthorne. It is the only timber-framed yeoman farmer's house still surviving in Stoke-on-Trent. Originally, it stood in 36 acres (150,000 m^{2}) of farmland, but this has been gradually encroached upon over the years so that now it is surrounded by comparatively small grounds. Beyond its grounds there is now housing, a busy minor road, and a nature reserve. The house functions as a 17th-century period historic house museum, managed by Stoke-on-Trent City Council. Ford Green Hall has now been transferred to Ford Green Hall Ltd, a charitable organisation. Led by volunteers and members of the local community, the company's profits will be used to run and improve the museum. Ford Green Hall is continuing to work closely with Stoke-on-Trent City Council and its museums. stokemuseums.org.uk

Ford Green Hall is one of three listed buildings in Smallthorne. The others are Ford Green Farm built in the mid 18th century and St. Saviours Church.

=== Green Star public house and Esperanto ===
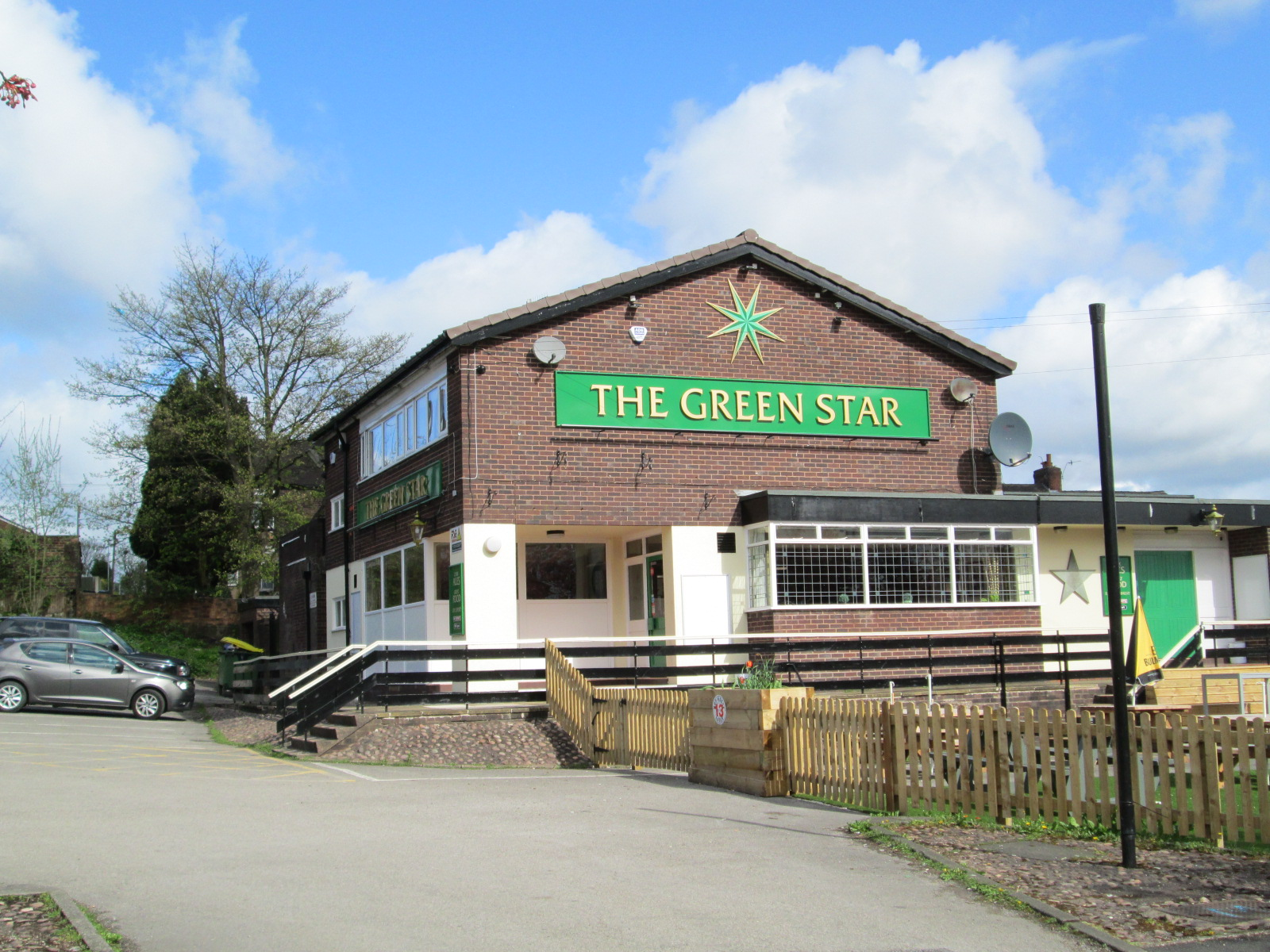
The Green Star

A Lord Mayor of Stoke-on-Trent in the 1950s, Horace Barks was a strong advocate of Esperanto (gaining the nickname Mr Esperanto). When 'The Green Star', a Smallthorne pub, was being built Barks requested that the brewery add the words 'la verda stelo' (the pub's name in Esperanto) onto the side of the building (the green star is a symbol of Esperanto). The brewer agreed. The Green Star can still be found on the corner of Esperanto Way, a stone's throw from Zamenhof Grove (named for the creator of Esperanto) though from some time in 2005 the sign saying 'la verda stelo' is no longer displayed.

The office and administrative centre of 'Esperanto-Asocio de Britio' (Esperanto Association of Britain) is just outside Stoke-on-Trent in the Wedgwood Memorial College, Barlaston. Horace Barks helped set up the first courses there in 1960.

== Notable people ==
- Arthur Berry, playwright, poet, teacher and artist
- Mark Bright, professional footballer and BBC sports pundit
- Albert Leake, professional footballer
- Alan Martin, professional footballer
