= Christopher Colclough =

British development economist and academic

Christopher Louis Colclough (10 July 1946 – 28 June 2017) was a British development economist and academic, who specialised in education in developing countries.

Colclough was director, Centre for Education and International Development, and Commonwealth Professor of Education and Development, Faculty of Education, University of Cambridge. He also was a life fellow of Corpus Christi College, Cambridge.

Following a series of gifts and bequests from Professor Colclough, Corpus Christi College, Cambridge instituted a Christopher Colclough Scholarship to support students of the college undertaking graduate studies at the university in the field of development economics and kindred disciplines in the social sciences
