= Graham Colclough =

Australian rules footballer (1883–1954)

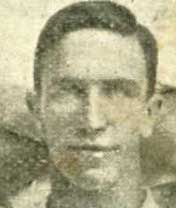

Personal information
- Full name: John James Graham Colclough
- Born: 15 October 1883; Ascot Vale, Victoria
- Died: 28 April 1954 (aged 70); Richmond, Victoria
- Original team: Scotch College

Playing career^{1}
Years	Club	Games (Goals)
1901	Melbourne	11 (8)
- ^{1} Playing statistics correct to the end of 1901.

John James Graham Colclough DCM (15 October 1883 – 28 April 1954) was an Australian rules footballer who played with Melbourne in the Victorian Football League (VFL).

== Family ==
The son of Richard Colclough (1839–1908), and Jean Colclough (1849–1927), née Graham, John James Graham Colclough was born at Ascot Vale, Victoria on 15 October 1883.

He married twice:

- He married Mary Grant (1878–1914) on 3 March 1908; they had two sons: Richard Roy Grant Colclough (1908–1985), and John Graham Colclough (1914–1916).
- He married Annie Isabella McNaughton (1890–1977) in 1925; they had one daughter: Janet Isobel Colclough (1927–), later, Mrs. Dimmick.

== Education ==
Educated at Scotch College, Melbourne, he played with the school's First XVII in 1899, 1900, and 1901.

== Football ==
=== Melbourne ===
He played 11 games for Melbourne in 1901, while he was still attending Scotch College (which, at the time, was located in East Melbourne); and, on one occasion, he missed a game because he needed to study for a Monday school examination.

=== Ballarat ===
In 1902 he was cleared from Melbourne to play with Ballarat Football Club. He played with the club for four seasons (1902–1905).

== Military career ==
Stating that his occupation was "stock and station agent, he enlisted in the First AIF on 11 November 1915.

He was awarded the Distinguished Conduct Medal (DCM) in 1917. He was awarded the Belgian Croix de Guerre in 1918. He was promoted to Second Lieutenant in April 1918.

== Death ==
He died at Richmond, Victoria on 28 April 1954.
