= Mary Colclough =

Mary Ann Colclough (née Barnes; 20 February 1836–7 March 1885) was a New Zealand feminist and social reformer. She was born in London, England on 20 February 1836. She contributed to various colonial newspapers under the pseudonym Polly Plum.

== Early life ==
Mary Ann Colclough was born in London in 1836, daughter of Susan and John Thomas Barnes, builder. She was trained as a teacher and came to New Zealand in 1859, settling in Auckland. On 9 May 1861, at Onehunga, she married Thomas Caesar Colclough (died July 1867), formerly of Galleenstown Castle, County Dublin. There were two children: a daughter Mary Louise (1862–1953) and a son William Caesar Sarsfield (1864–1926).

== Activism ==
Although her work has been overlooked and forgotten, Mary Ann Colclough was one of the earliest, and certainly among the most talented, of feminist leaders in this country. During the late sixties and early seventies and under the pseudonym of “Polly Plum”, she came to the fore as a contributor to various colonial newspapers. Her articles, which were most competently written, ranged over a variety of topics from matters of domestic interest, good housekeeping, and the like, to a forthright advocacy of “women's rights”. Her early journalistic sallies were sententious in tone, very much in accord with the literary conventions of the day, but her mature writing was concerned mainly with those issues which affected women's status in the home and community. In this phase of her career Mary Colclough showed herself to be a woman with a practical cast of mind and of high ideals and principles, who was deeply conscious of the many social problems that called for urgent redress. She kept the campaign alive by occasional letters to the press, sometimes published as far afield as the Melbourne Argus and London Times. These were invariably well expressed and to the point.

It was as a lecturer, however, that “Polly Plum”, reformer and feminist, became widely known. Almost before political meetings had become the vogue, she was able to attract large audiences and, on one occasion, spoke before Governor Sir G. F. Bowen. As the outstanding champion of women's rights, she hotly attacked the “legal subjection” of her sex. She ridiculed the idea that women should be educated only for the home; all employment, including such professions as that of medicine, should be open to them. She challenged the right of the father to have sole control over his children and pointed out the injustice of the law as regards the property rights of married women. At the same time, she pressed for an improvement in the working conditions of seamstresses, shop assistants, and domestics, with adequate safeguards against poverty and the problems of old age. She must have been a compelling advocate; according to contemporary evidence, “... one of the most fluent and accurate speakers we have listened to in the colonies.”

In 1875 Mary Colclough began a campaign in Melbourne. She seems to have met with little success, for, like many feminist reformers of the time, she was well in advance of public opinion. The Argus commented acidly on her efforts to ameliorate the condition of her sex throughout the world and saw no ground “for weeping over the melodramatic misery” of her protéges. It is possible – though unlikely – that such rebuffs cooled her reforming ardour; nevertheless, by the late seventies she seems to have withdrawn from the public scene. She was certainly engaged in teaching at this time, first at Auckland and, later, in Canterbury. From about 1876 to 1878 she was mistress in charge of the girls' school at Rangiora, and in 1881 was infant mistress at Papanui. It is evident that her associations with the north must have weakened, for when news of her unexpected death reached Auckland in March 1885, it aroused little comment beyond the bald statement that her death would be regretted by many who knew her in the olden times.

== Death ==
She died in Picton on 7 March 1885, after an accident in which she broke her arm and a leg. She was buried in the Picton Cemetery.
