= Ball Green =

Village in Staffordshire, England

Coordinates: 53.06°N 02.16°W

- Estate
- Location within the United Kingdom
- Population: 2,615
- OS grid reference: SJ8952
- District: Stoke-on-Trent
- Shire county: Staffordshire
- Country: England
- Sovereign state: United Kingdom
- Post town: Stoke-on-Trent
- Postcode district: ST6
- Dialling code: 01782
- UK Parliament: Stoke-on-Trent

Ball Green is an estate in Stoke-on-Trent. Ball Green is in the suburb of Norton near to Tunstall.
