= Bradeley =

Village in Staffordshire, England

Coordinates: 53.05°N 02.18°W

- Location within Staffordshire
- Population: 5,751 (2011.Ward.Bradeley and Chell Heath)
- OS grid reference: SJ8851
- Unitary authority: Stoke-on-Trent
- Shire county: Staffordshire
- Region: West Midlands
- Country: England
- Sovereign state: United Kingdom
- Post town: Stoke-on-Trent
- Postcode district: ST6
- Police: Staffordshire
- Fire: Staffordshire
- Ambulance: West Midlands

Bradeley is a suburban area in the city of Stoke-on-Trent, Staffordshire, England. It was mentioned in the Domesday Book but became more established as a mining community for the local coal pits in Norton and Chatterley Whitfield. A hostel existed on the east side of Chell Heath Road until the 1970s, where incoming miners from different parts of Britain and also overseas would be housed.

Several farms around the village were gradually sold for development. Some former farmland is now used for sport and recreation.

In the 1960s there were three churches; an Anglican, a Methodist church in Brammer Street and a Primitive Methodist church in Unwin Street. Today there is a new non-denominational church called Emmanuel church on Chell Heath Road, close to the site of the original Church of England church. Nearby is The Kingdom Hall of Jehovah's Witnesses.

A Co-op grocery store stood on Moorland View with an attached butchers shop. On Unwin Street there was a post office which was eventually transferred to the shop on the corner of Chell Heath Road and Hayes Street but has since been closed; it now serves as a sandwich shop.

Bradeley was known for brickmaking until the early 1970s - the Wilkinson Bros. factory was located at Acreswood, on the west side of the village, where clay was drawn from a pit and high quality bricks made.

== Notes ==
David Steele, international English cricketer, was born in Bradeley in 1941.
