= Chatterley Whitfield =

Disused coal mine in Chell, Staffordshire, England

Coordinates: 53.0764°N 2.1752°W

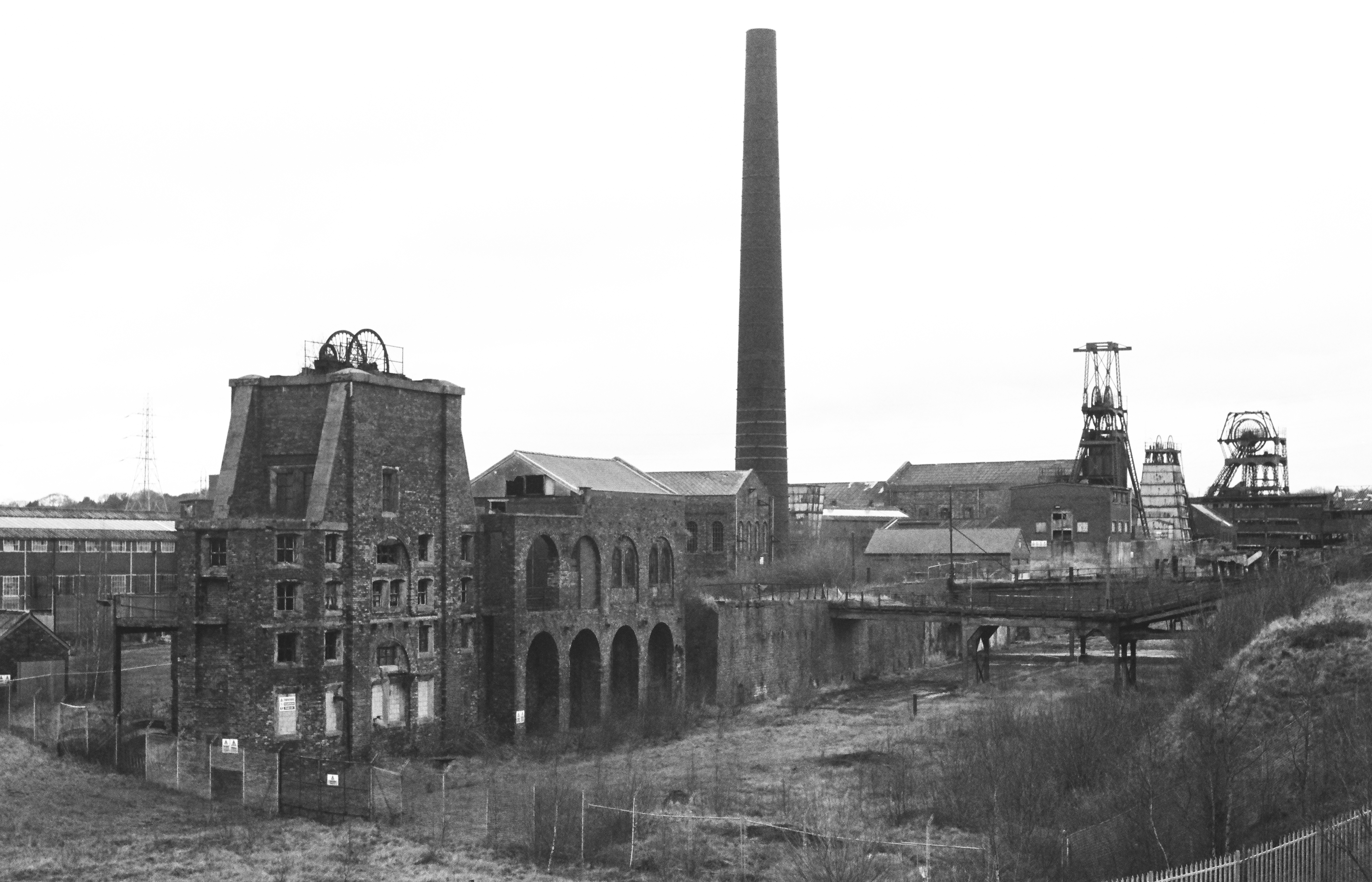
Chatterley Whitfield Colliery from the nearby spoil heap

Chatterley Whitfield Colliery is a disused coal mine on the outskirts of Chell, Staffordshire in Stoke on Trent. It was the largest mine working The North Staffordshire Coalfield and was the first colliery in The UK to produce 1,000,000 tons of saleable coal in a year.

== History ==
=== Pre-1863 ===
The date at which coal was first mined systematically in the Whitfield area is not known, but there are references to mining in the manor of Tunstall from the late 13th century onwards. A local tradition claims that the monks of the Hulton Abbey came to nearby Ridgeway during the 14th and 15th centuries, to work coal from some of the eight seams outcropping half a mile east of Whitfield. These early workings were known as 'footrails' and were driven down from the surface.

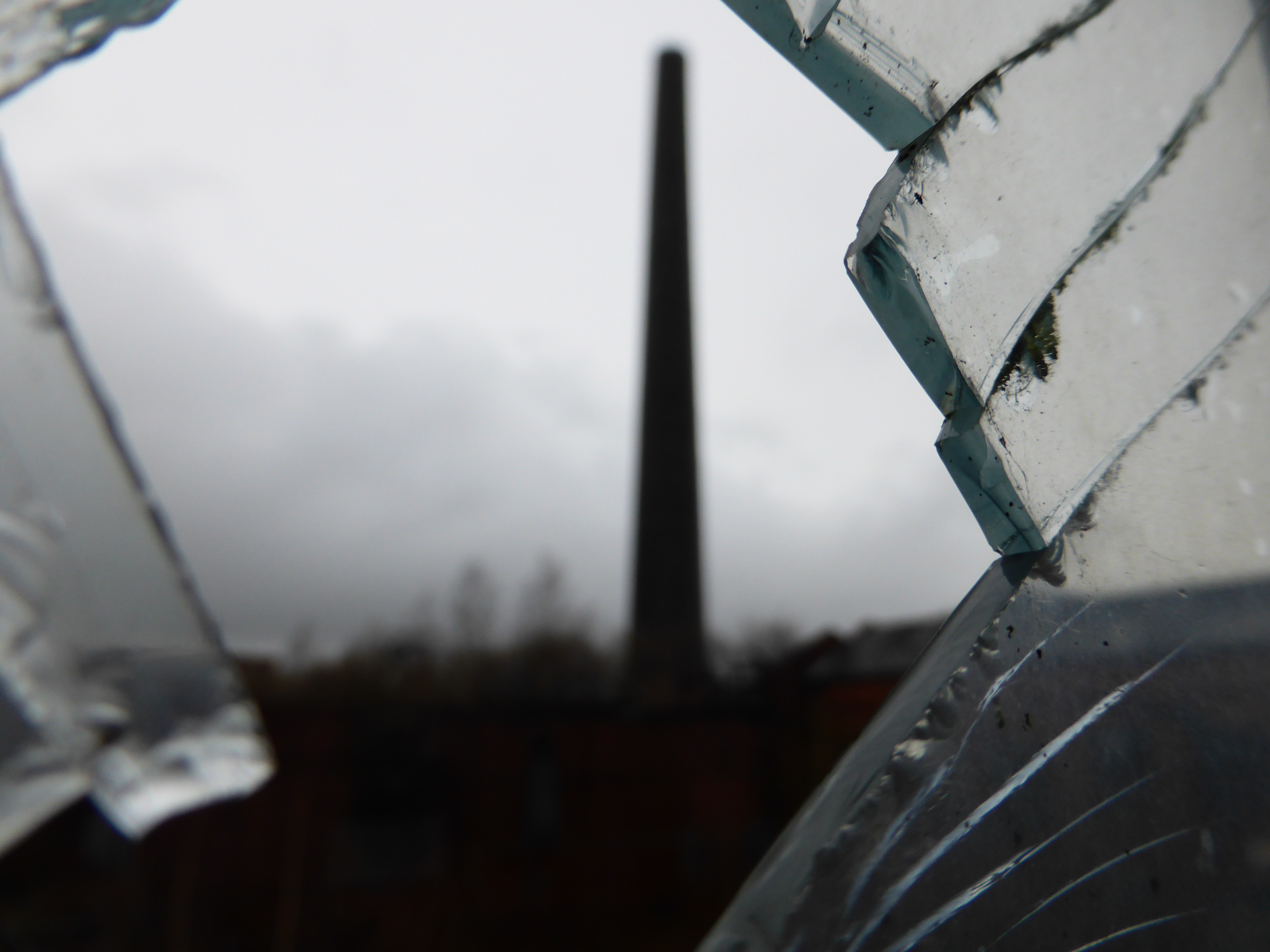
The iconic chimney viewed through one of the broken windows of a nearby heapstead (building)

Shaw's History of The Potteries tells us that in 1750, Ralph Leigh of Burslem collected coal from Whitfield twice a day. His six horses each carried between two and three hundredweights of coal along lanes which were impassable to wagons. These draughts of coal were each worth about seven pence (3p) and Leigh received one shilling (5p) a day for his services.

In 1838, Thomas Hargreaves conducted a survey and valuation of the colliery at Whitfield on behalf of its proprietors, representatives of the late William Harrison. At this time there was an engine house, coal wharf, carpenters shop and brickworks on the site. The buildings, machinery and coal stocks were collectively valued at £154 7s. 6d. (£154.37.5p).

Hugh Henshall Williamson, a local man who lived nearby at Greenway Bank Hall, was mining in the Whitfield area by 1853. His mining activities at this period are somewhat uncertain, but it is most probable that Williamson first made use of existing mining sites and shallow shafts. In 1853 it is fairly certain that he was working the Cockshead and Seven Feet Banbury seams at the Ridgeway footrails. It is also probable that he was using the Bellringer shaft, which was 79 yards deep, to work the Bellringer seam and the Ragman and Engine shafts. Each of these shafts was 50 yards (46 metres) deep and these were used to work the Ragman seam.

In 1854 the local coalmasters forced the North Staffordshire Railway to construct the Biddulph Valley branch line after proposing to build the railway themselves, a situation which the NSR did not favour. Work on the construction of the railway did not start until 1858, the line being partly opened for mineral traffic in 1859, and completed in 1860, passing within half a mile of Whitfield.

Anticipating the completion of the railway, Hugh Henshall Williamson sank the Prince Albert shaft to work the Holly Lane and Hardmine seams and another shaft to work both the Bowling Alley and Ten Feet seams. On the opening of the railway he immediately constructed his own rail link from the shafts at Whitfield and footrails at Ridgeway, to Chell Sidings alongside the NSR Biddulph Valley Line. Wagons loaded with coal were lowered by brake down to the sidings and horses were used to haul empty wagons back up to the colliery.

=== 1863 to 1876 ===
In 1863 the Ragman shaft was deepened to the Ten Feet seam at a depth of 150 yards (140 m). At this time one winding engine served the Ragman, Engine and Bellringer shafts. Coal was wound up the shafts in 8cwt. tubs hooked onto the winding rope by chains. The men were also raised and lowered in these tubs; a dangerous, but common practice used before the introduction of cages.

As the coal workings became deeper, ventilation was a major problem, especially in seams giving off large quantities of the highly explosive gas methane. In 1868 the Whitfield colliers were still using candles, an obviously dangerous practice.

Hugh Henshall Williamson died in December 1867. In November of that year, just before his death, the colliery changed hands and a group known as the 'Gentlemen of Tunstall' took it over, forming the first limited liability company to operate the mine. The Whitfield Colliery Company Limited bought both the colliery and a 214-acre (87 ha) estate for £40,000 and a prospectus issued in 1868 indicates that the capital for the proposed company was to be £25,000.

The new owners of Whitfield immediately set about the task of improving the shafts by deepening the Engine Pit to the same level as the Ragman Pit (148 yards) and widening both shafts to accommodate two cages. each shaft was provided with its own steam winding engine and the use of the Bellringer shaft was discontinued.

The life of the Whitfield Colliery Company Limited was of limited duration, coming to an end in 1872. At about this time the Chatterley Iron Company Limited, who owned blast furnaces, an oil distilling plant and a colliery working ironstone in the Chatterley Valley, west of Tunstall, were looking for an adequate supply of coal for its furnaces. In early 1873 Mr Charles J. Homer, its Managing Director, purchased the Whitfield Colliery on behalf of his company. On taking over, the new owners lost no time in starting a project to develop workings in the rich Cockshead seam of coal, and in 1874 they began to widen and deepen the old Bellringer shaft to a depth of 440 yards.

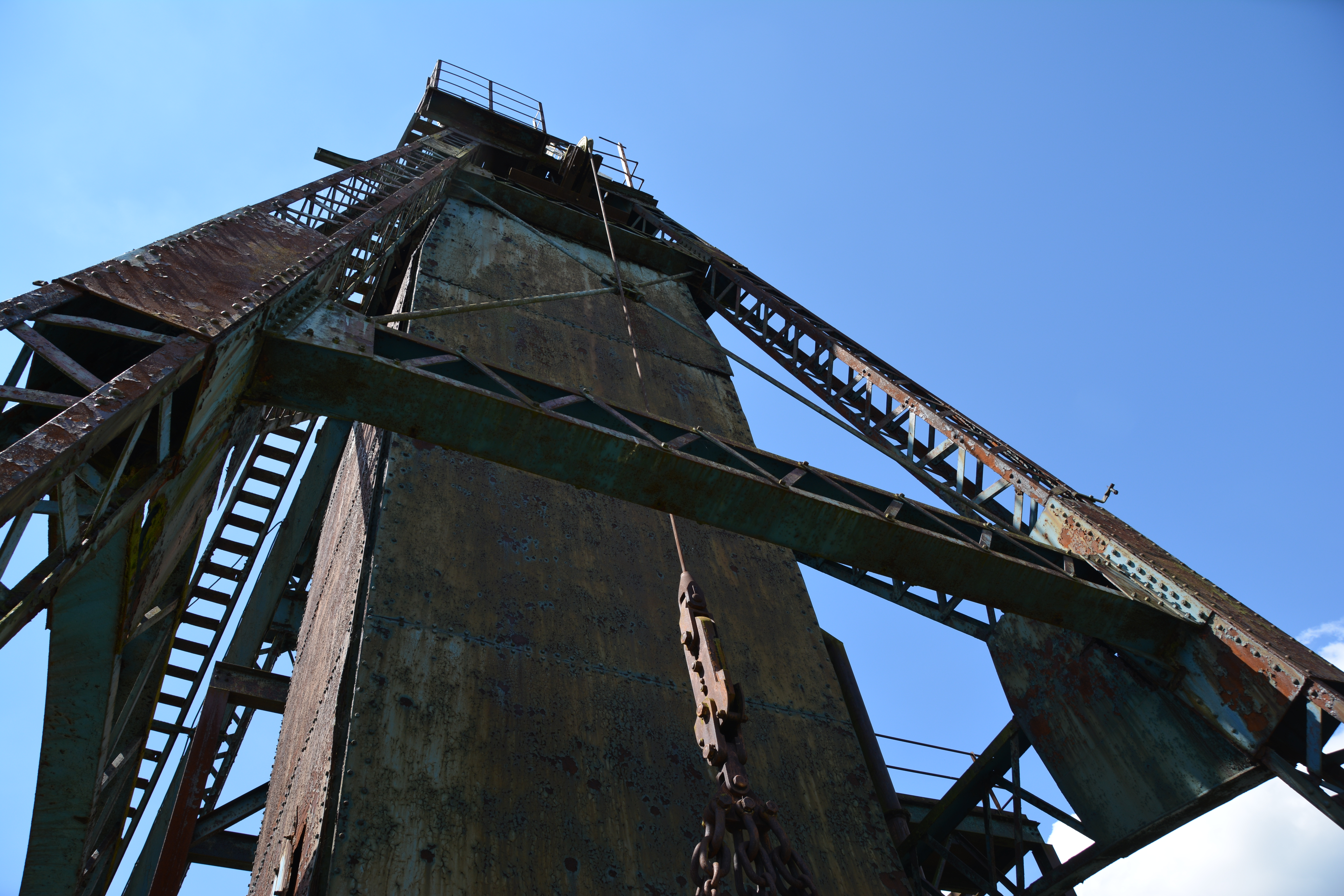
The Institute headgear

Shortly after the sinking work began, the North Staffordshire Institute of Mining Engineers made a visit to the colliery, and to commemorate the occasion the Bellringer shaft was renamed the Institute. In 1874 the colliery company also started to widen and deepen an old shaft, originally sunk by Hugh Henshall Williamson in the 1850s and sited to the north-east of the Institute. This shaft was to act as the upcast for the Institute Pit and was named the Laura, after Mr Charles J. Homer's daughter. Both shafts were completed in 1876.

=== 1881 Pit Disaster ===
During the early morning of Monday, 7 February 1881 there was a serious fire and explosion at Whitfield. The latter fire was caused by the misuse of an underground blacksmith's furnace which resulted in an explosion, killing twenty-four men and boys.

The force of the explosion caused the collapse of the Laura Pit and the entire shaft and pit top were abandoned. At the same time the Institute shaft had to be partly filled, in an effort to extinguish the fire. Later, an enquiry into the explosion was held at the nearby Norton Arms Public House, while at Staffords Assizes the Manager, Edwin Thompson, defended himself against a charge of manslaughter and was acquitted.

In an effort to recover lost output, the Middle Pit shaft (formerly the Ragman) was deepened to the Hardmine seam in 1881, and a new upcast shaft to replace the Laura was sunk to the Cockshead seam.

=== 1876 to 1884 ===
As the output of coal at Whitfield increased, it became necessary to improve the coal transport system. Despite opposition from the North Staffordshire Railway, the company started to construct a private railway in 1873 to run from Whitfield to Pinnox where sidings were to join up with the lower Tunstall Branch of the NS Railway. The line was finally completed in 1878 and considerably reduced the cost of transporting coal from Whitfield to the blast furnaces at Chatterley.

In 1876 the company ran into serious financial difficulties. The heavy capital expenditure of the earlier years and a recession in trade began to take their effect. To overcome this a policy of rigorous economy was introduced and numerous small pits were closed. This policy was strongly opposed by Mr Charles J. Homer and he resigned over the issue. However, as the economies began to take effect and the output of coal increased, the company was able to weather the storm.

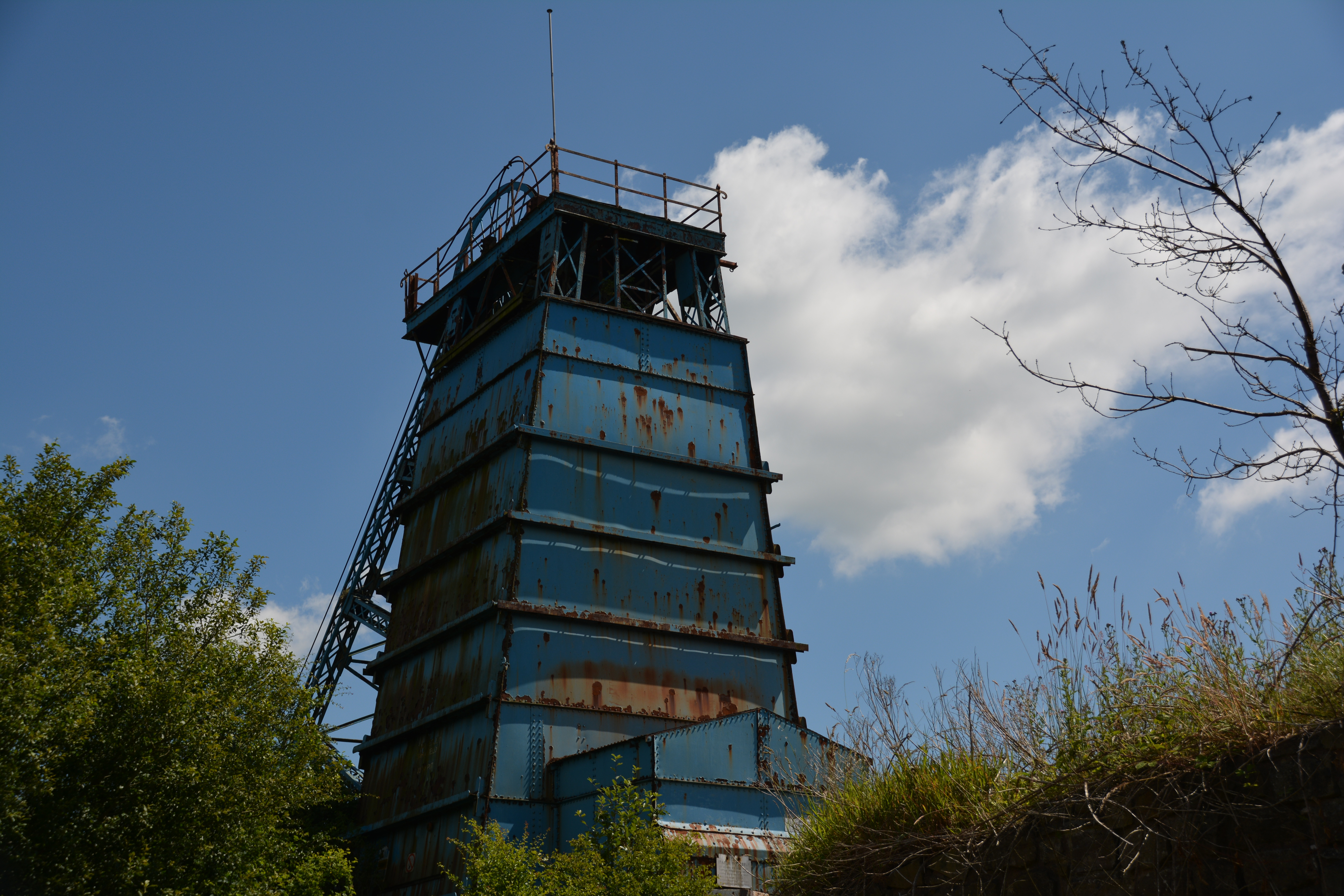
The Platt shaft and headgear

Unfortunately, just as the company was recovering, it was beset by further misfortunes. In 1880, the oil distillery at Chatterley was destroyed by fire.

In an effort to recover lost output, the Middle Pit shaft (formerly the Ragman) was deepened to the Hardmine seam in 1881, and a new upcast shaft to replace the Laura was sunk to the Cockshead seam. The latter shaft was completed in 1883 and named the Platt Pit after one of the Directors of the Company. In 1884 the company was again beset by heavy financial difficulties and an application was made to the Court for permission for its closure. The application was eventually withdrawn, the company's affairs being placed under the control of three liquidators. One of these was the previous Company Secretary, John Renshaw Wain. It was his son, Edward Brownfield Wain, who was to lead the Company to its 'Golden Age'

=== 1884 to 1920s ===
Aerial view of Chatterley Whitfield Colliery

Much of the success of the recovery can be directly attributed to Edward Brownfield Wain, who had been appointed Undermanager in 1882. He soon introduced the more productive longwall working of the coalfaces in place of the more traditional 'pillar and stall' system. He was appointed Colliery Manager in 1886 and by 1890 the Company was once more paying its way. In the same year the liquidators came to an understanding with the North of England Trustee, Debenture and Assets Corporation Limited of Manchester, who agreed to purchase the old Chatterley Iron Company.

The new Company became Chatterley Whitfield Collieries Limited and a great period of expansion began. So much so that by 1899 the colliery produced in excess of 950,000 tons of saleable coal. The fortunes of the Chatterley Iron Company began to decline as a result and operations at the Chatterley site had ceased by the early part of the 20th century. The dawn of the 20th century, however, promised a great future for Chatterley Whitfield Colliery. It is interesting to note, however, that in the 21st century, many local people still refer to it by its old name of Whitfield Colliery.

The colliery continued to prosper but, following a minor explosion in 1912 which fortunately resulted in no fatalities, it became obvious that additional ventilation was required. It was therefore decided to sink a new ventilation shaft and work commenced in April 1913. The shaft was 5 yards (4.6 m) in diameter and 700-foot (210 m). It was completed in 1914. The heapstead and winding engine house were constructed entirely of brick to a German design and is unique in British coal mining. It is believed that the German construction workers were interned during the First World War.

The shaft was named after the Company's Mining Engineer, Robert Winstanley. As a direct result, the Prince Albert shaft, located behind the present Hesketh shaft and the Engine Pit, located between the newly sunk Winstanley shaft and the Middle Pit, were closed and filled.

The Winstanley shaft was barely finished when plans were drawn up for a new deep shaft to maintain and operate the north and south Cockshead dips which in the Institute shaft had reached a length of 2092 yards (1913 metres) from the pit bottom.

After much consideration, the new shaft was sunk to the east of the Platt shaft and preparatory work started in 1914. Shaft sinking commenced in June 1915 and was completed by May 1917 to a depth of 640 yards (590 m). It was named after Colonel George Hesketh who was the Chairman of the Board of Directors. A massive horizontal steam winding engine, which still exists, was installed by the Worsley Mesnes company of Manchester in the Winding Engine House to become one of the principal coal winding shafts. A new power house was also constructed as part of the complex. In 1923 the original parallel drum was replaced by a bi-cylindro drum which made the winding of coal much easier.

=== 1920s to 1947 ===
Up to 1915, all the coal at Whitfield had to be hewn from the coal face without the aid of machinery. In that year, however, electrically driven coal cutters and compressed air shaker conveyors were introduced to help remove some of the physical work required to mine and transport the coal from the face.

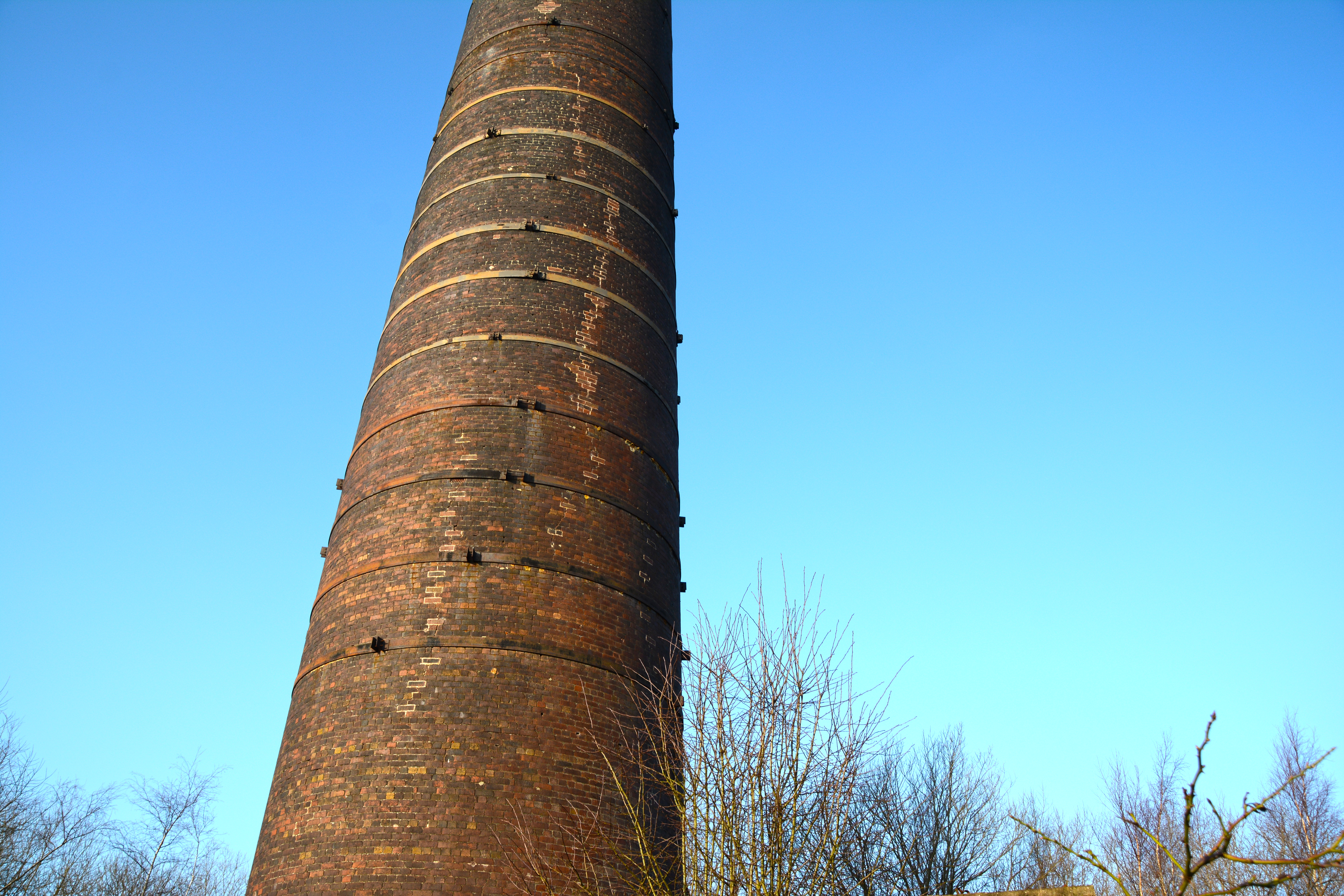
The main chimney built during 1891

In 1920 an ex-army hut provided the colliery with its first canteen facilities and work began on a new lamp room to house the heavy electric lamps which were gradually being introduced and used in addition to the conventional oil safety lamps.

The late 1920s and early 1930s were difficult times for colliery owners and miners alike. During the general strike of 1926, convoys of motor lorries travelled to Whitfield from all over the country to buy the small coal that was stocked at the colliery. In 1929 only 193 days were worked and during the Depression 300 Whitfield miners were made redundant. North Staffordshire collieries worked on a tonnage quota system during this period and when the monthly quota had been produced they had to stop work.

By 1932 all underground haulage had been mechanised and most pit ponies taken out of the pit. Steel supports began to replace the traditional timber pit props. These originally were not universally accepted because miners complained that whereas timber supports creaked when they began to break, which acted as a warning, steel supports did not. Eventually, however, steel supports were accepted. There were also technological advances with coal cutters and conveyors which were becoming increasingly necessary as tonnage began to increase.

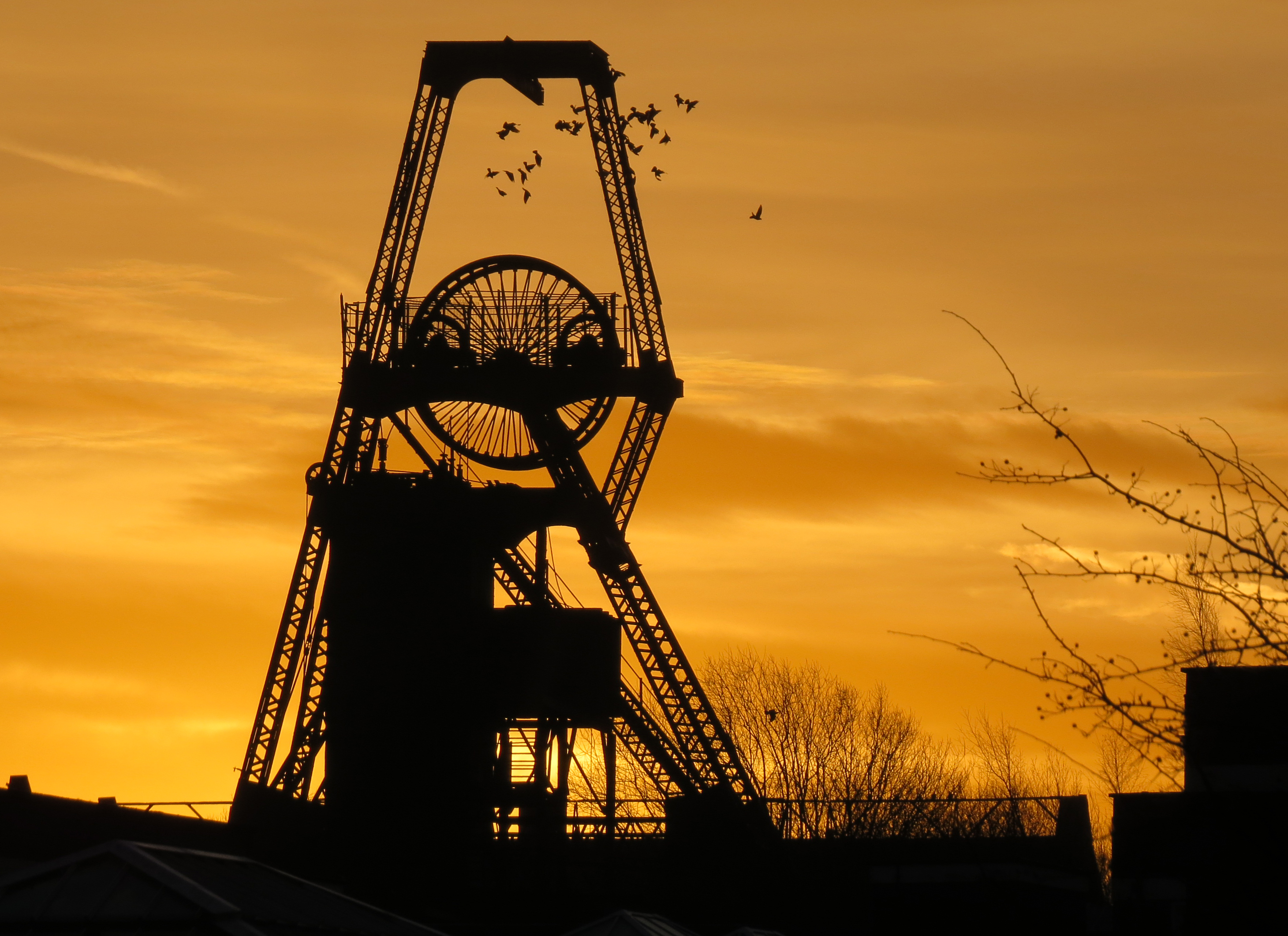
The Institute headgear

In 1934 a modern office block was constructed to replace the old Head Offices of the Company in Pinnox Street in Tunstall and most staff were transferred to Whitfield. Those remaining at Pinnox Street dealt with the transfer of loaded and unload trains to the North Staffordshire Railway in Tunstall. This also brought to an end the Saturday 'Pay Train' whereby the wages were taken from Pinnox Street to Whitfield for payment on Saturday afternoon. The colliery pay week was from Wednesday to Tuesday.

The canteen was opened and at the same time a new fitting and electric shop replaced the old one under the Middle Pit Power House which had become inadequate. In 1938 a new boiler house containing twelve Lancashire boilers fuelled by pulverised coal and considered to be one of the best in Britain was brought into use. In the same year, the Pithead Baths, containing 3,817 'clean' and 3,817 'dirty' lockers was brought into use on Saturday, 29 January. The canteen was also opened in 1938.

The 1930s were momentous for Whitfield because not only were there over 4,000 men employed, but in 1937 it became the first colliery in Britain to mine one million saleable tons in one year, a feat it also achieved in 1938.

From 1938 onwards and during the Second World War, there was little change until the mines were Nationalised on Wednesday, 1 January 1947.

=== 1930 Site Audit ===
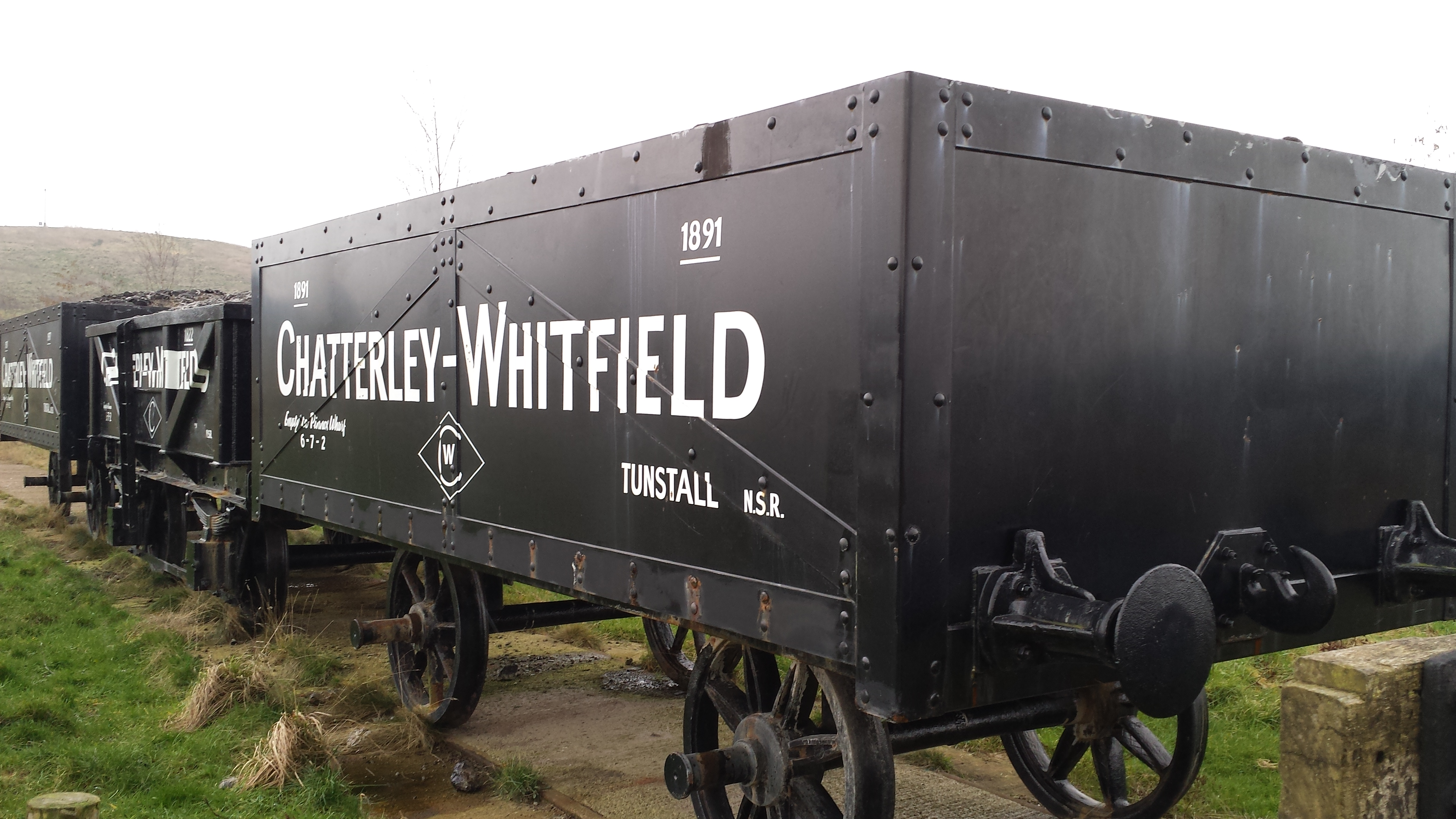
Tubs

COAL WINDING SHAFTS – 1930
Hesketh Pit – 1917

640 yards to the decking level, capacity of the cage – six 10cwt tubs, these tubs being pushed into the cage by hand both on the surface and underground.

Shaft capacity per eleven shifts, approximately eleven thousand tons.

Diameter of shaft twenty one feet.

Institute

440 yards to the decking level, capacity of the cage – four 10cwt tubs, these tubs being pushed into the cage by hand both on the surface and underground.

Shaft capacity per eleven shifts, approximately ten thousand tons.

Diameter of shaft sixteen feet.

1910 new steel headgear installed

Middle Pit 1850 worked until 1917

240 yards to the decking level, capacity of the cage – three decks with two 8cwt tubs in each deck, these tubs being pushed into the cage by hand both on the surface and underground.

Shaft capacity per eleven shifts, approximately eight thousand tons.

Diameter of shaft twelve feet with wooden cage guides.

Upcast shafts - 1930
Platt Pit

440 yards to the decking level, two deck cage, upcast shaft for both the Hesketh and Institute shafts. Diameter of the shaft – sixteen feet.

Winstanley

240 yards to the decking Ievel, upcast shaft along with the Engine Pit for all the workings in the Middle Pit. Diameter of the shaft – sixteen feet with steel rope guides.

Engine Pit

110 yards to the decking leve1, upcast shaft along with the Winstanley shaft for all the workings in the Middle pit. Diameter of the shaft – nine feet.

Steam Raising Boilers

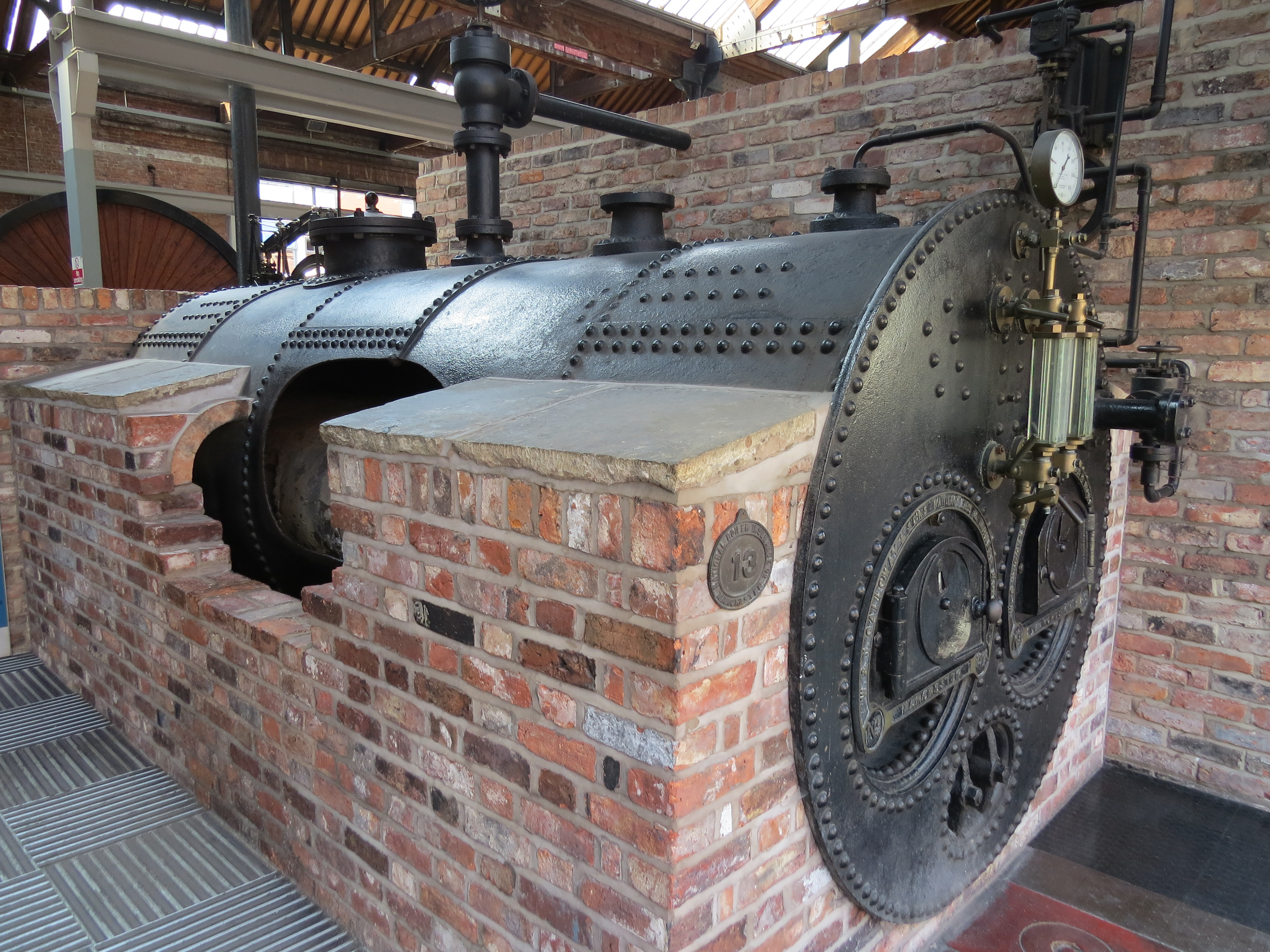
Lancashire Boiler

Middle Pit Range

15 Hand-fired. Lancashire boilers, permissible working pressure = 100 lbs. Only 12 boilers in use normally. Number of stokers required per 24 hours = 24. Number of coal and ash men required per 24 hours = 18 Total number of men required to man these boilers per 24 hours = 42

Hesketh Range

5 Hand-fired. Lancashire boilers, permissible working pressure = 200 lbs. Only 4 boilers normally in use. Cost of working the boilers per 24-hour period = £109.00

Surface Locomotives

1. Katie, six wheels, purchased in 1876 2. Alice, six wheels, purchased in 1876 3. Pollie, six wheels, purchased in 1881 4. Dolly, four wheels, purchased in 1891 5. Roger, six wheels, purchased in 1896 6. Phoenix, four wheels, purchased in 1899 7. Edward, six wheels, purchased in 1902 8. Alexandra, six wheels, purchased in 1910 9. George, six wheels, purchased in 1910 10. Minnie, six wheels, purchased in 1912

Number of Railway Wagons

290 of 12 ton capacity
881 of 10 ton capacity
500 of 8 tone capacity

426 of the 8-ton-capacity wagons are in use for local traffic only. Number of railway wagons repaired from January to June 1930 = 87 Number of men and boys employed on wagon repairs = 41 Total wages paid for railway wagon repairs in same six-month period = £2,475 4/3d

Number of Horses and Ponies Underground = 34 Surface = 8 Cost of keeping one horse or pony week = 9/6d. (48 pence in new money) Miles of Railway track belonging to the colliery on the main line and siding = 24 miles

Number of Motor Vehicles

One Albion 26 horsepower lorry
Four Ford 20 horsepower lorries
One Ford 16 horsepower lorry
One Ford 21 horsepower Ambulance
One Austin 12 horsepower private car
One Essex 17 horsepower private car

In 1930 there were 50 miles of underground roadways kept in repair - Chatterley Whitfield was a wet pit and they had to pump water so it could continue to operate. In 1930 they had 16 underground pumps and the average amount of water pumped out of the mine in a 24-hour period was 542,000 gallons (2.46 million liters). This water was pumped into a pond on the surface and the water re-pumped to the boilers and washeries.

=== 1947 to 1977 ===
After Wednesday, 1 January 1947 (Vesting Day) a policy of modernisation took place throughout the whole mining industry. In 1952 mine cars and locomotive haulage were introduced underground at Whitfield and a new mine car circuit installed on the surface. The building to accommodate this is still standing.

With the advent of cheap oil supplies from abroad in the late 1950s, contraction in the coal mining industry began to take place. The collieries most affected by this were the older ones where the best coal had been worked out and at which it was difficult to mine coal economically. Chatterley Whitfield was one of the victims of this period, output declining from over one million tons per year in 1937 to 408,000 tons in 1965.

Coal drawing stopped at the Institute shaft in 1955 and the Middle Pit in 1968. In 1974 it was decided that Whitfield coal could be more easily worked from Wolstanton Colliery and an underground roadway was driven to join the two pits. In 1977 coal drawing at Chatterley Whitfield came to an end.

=== 1976 to 1986 ===
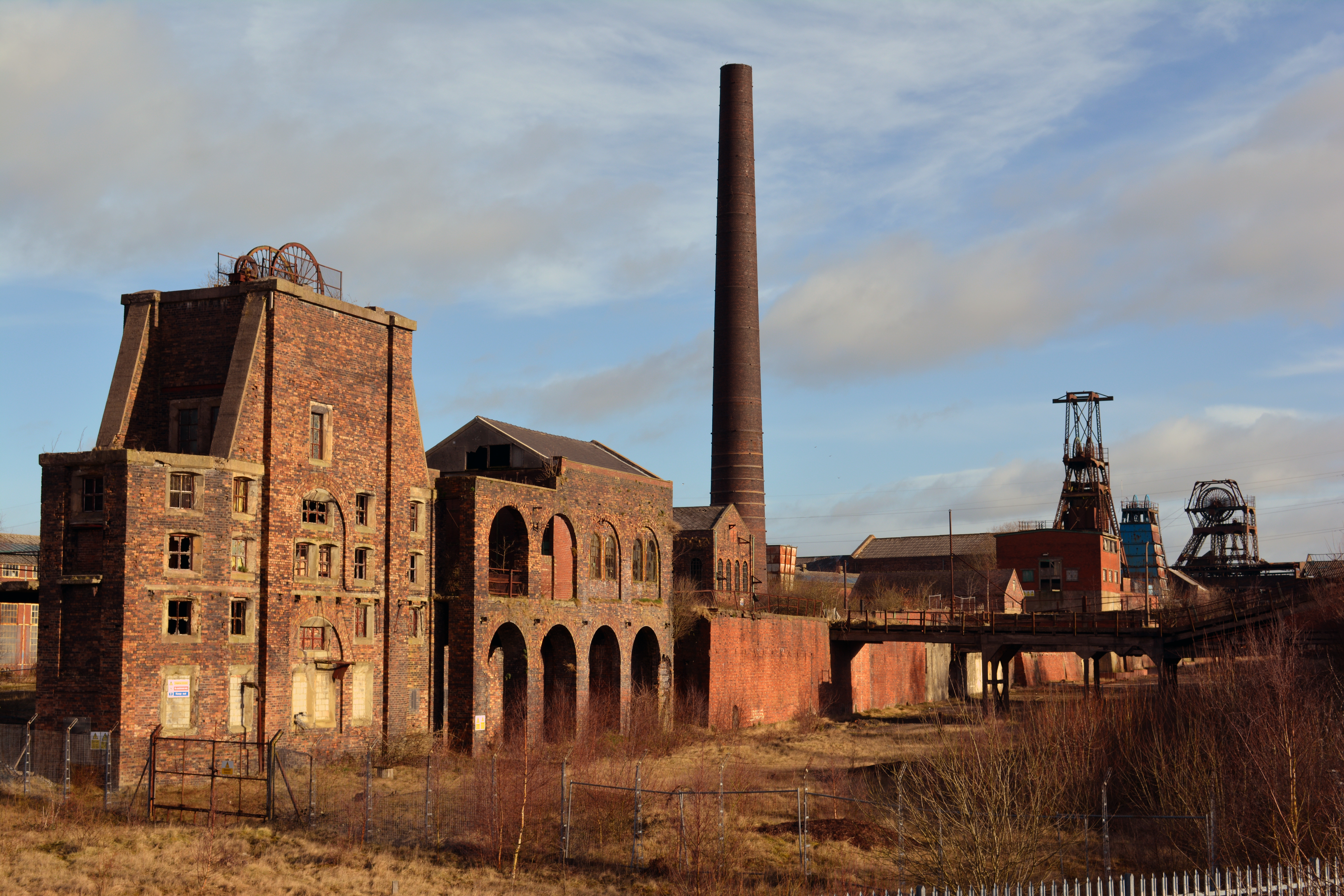
Chatterley Whitfield Colliery

After coal production stopped at Chatterley Whitfield a brave venture was started by an independent charitable trust to turn the colliery into Britain's first underground mining museum. Before any visitors could take this underground trip much preparation work had to be done on site. Derelict buildings were renovated, the underground galleries were made safe, for visitors and mining machinery restored in its original working condition in order to show in great realism the life and working conditions of local miners and to preserve an example of the country's industrial heritage.

In 1979 the Chatterley Whitfield Mining Museum opened and it soon gained a reputation of being Britain's best known mining museum attracting over 70,000 visitors a year and contributing to the local tourism.

Underground tours were conducted until the nearby pit at Wolstanton closed.

Incidentally during this period and following the findings of the official inquiry into the Aberfan distaster the conically shaped spoil heap at Chatterley Whitfield was reduced in height by almost a half and took from 1976 until 1982 for the landscaping to be completed.

=== Why did the underground tours have to stop? ===
Mining in The Potteries Coalfield began with a large number of small pits. As the easy coal was won, pits had to become deeper to reach new seams, Mining also became mechanised and therefore a much more expensive industry. The number of collieries decreased, but their individual sizes became larger. Chatterley Whitfield was a major colliery in the 1930s ringed by other pits. Each had its own set of pumps to keep the workings dry and these lowered the water level in the whole area, but over the last fifty years (1986) the collieries around Chatterley Whitfield closed one by one. The north of the coalfield is mainly worked out. During Friday, 16 January 1976 Chatterley Whitfield eventually closed, and within three years the Mining Museum was opened.

Visitors descended down the Winstanley shaft a drop of 700 feet and explored a series of workings at this depth. These workings were only a fraction of the total extent of Chatterley Whitfield. The Institute shaft is 1320 feet deep and the Hesketh shaft descends nearly 2,000 feet (610 metres). Workings extended for miles and in the 1930s were in the region of 50 miles.

Towards the end of Chatterley Whitfield's last days it was connected to the nearby pit of Wolstanton via a 4-mile underground passageway. Wolstanton had shafts descending up to 3,000 feet (914 metres), and as it was the last working pit in the area, it was responsible for pumping. This had a direct effect on Chatterley Whitfield as it was high at 2,000 feet (610 metres) the pumping drained the 'Higher'.

In 1930 they had 16 underground pumps, and the average amount of water pumped out of the mine in a 24-hour period was 542,000 imperial gallons (2,460,000 L; 651,000 US gal), this water was pumped into a pond on the surface and the water re-pumped to the boilers and washeries.

In 1981 Wolstanton Colliery stopped coal production and after months of salvage work the pumps were turned off in May 1984. This meant that the water present would gradually rise to its natural level and slowly flood the abandoned workings at Wolstanton and then eventually Chatterley Whitfield. The cost of pumping was too high and could not be met by the museum.

The water would take years to rise to the level of the old Chatterley Whitfield tour at 700 feet (210 m) below ground, but there was another problem, coal gives off methane (Firedamp), a gas formed by the decay of plants which produced the coal millions of years ago. The gas is absorbed and adsorbed within the coal, but mining disturbs the ground and releases the gas. The gas is colourless and highly explosive. If there is sufficient in the air it reduces the amount of oxygen and causes suffocation.

Methane is lighter than air and it builds up under the roof of the mine. In a working pit the ventilation fans prevent this from happening, but when the fans stop the methane build up in the abandoned workings.

As the water slowly rose following the closure of Wolstanton the methane levels were monitored through a pipe in the Hesketh shaft. The signs were not good, as it was forecast the levels rose and with the levels also being affected by weather conditions it was decided that all the shafts must be capped and sealed, keeping the methane trapped below underground.

These two problems, the water levels and gas meant that it was unsafe to allow visitors to use the old underground workings of Chatterley Whitfield. The solution was a purpose built mining experience and this opened on Wednesday, 20 August 1986.

=== 1986 to 1993 ===
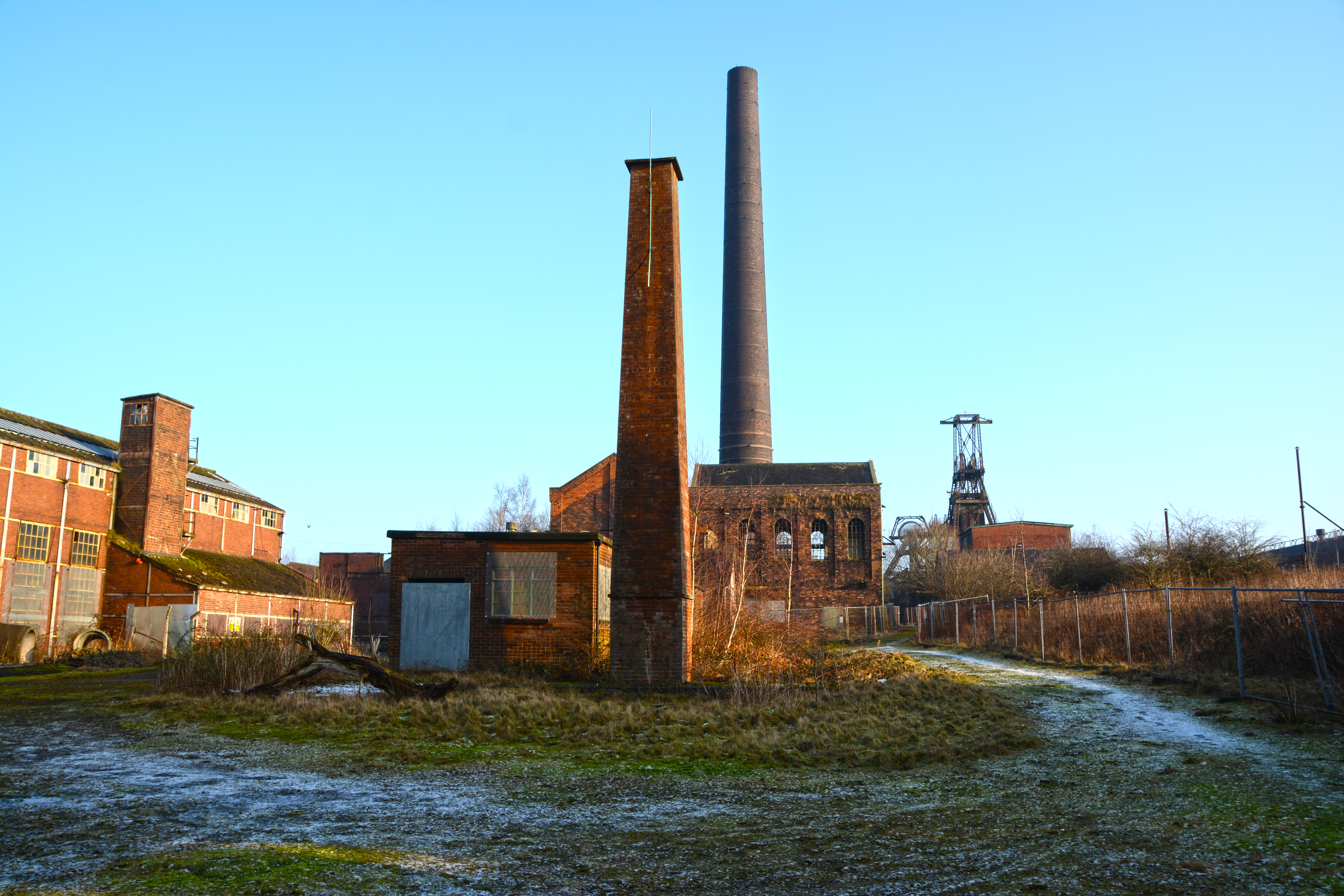
Chatterley Whitfield Colliery during a frosty morning

When British Coal seal the shafts of an old colliery they usually fill them right up to the surface. However it was quickly realised that at Chatterley Whitfield, the Museum would need a new underground tour and British Coal did all they could to help.

The first part of the plan was to plug two shafts well below the surface. The thick layer of concrete would prevent gas from rising any higher and it meant that the museum could still use the tops of the shafts – One shaft for visitors to experience the miners cage ride to work and the other shaft to demonstrate coal winding. From the pit bottom area the museum then started on a most unusual project – to build a new mine, using some shallow workings and the railway cutting, which would show the history of mining from 1850 to the present day.

The new Experience survived until the early 1990s, when the museum was closed on Monday, 9 August 1993 and put into the hands of the liquidators. Also in 1993, the entire site, including all surface buildings and sub-surface works were designated as a scheduled monument by Historic England.
