= Guillen =

Guillen is a surname, and may refer to:

- Alanis Guillen (born 1998), Brazilian actress
- Ambrosio Guillen (1929–1953), United States Marine, recipient of the Medal of Honor
- Hannia Guillen (born 1982), Cuban-American actress
- Justin Guillen (born 1986), Trinidadiad cricketer
- Laurice Guillen (born 1947), Filipino actress and director
- Luis Armando Andrade Guillen (born 1995), Mexican Paralympic swimmer
- Manel Guillen (born 1967), Spanish businessman and lawyer
- Noel Guillen (1926–1987), Trinidadian cricketer
- Rosalinda Guillen (born 1951), American activist
- Ryan Guillen (born 1977), American politician from Texas
- Sammy Guillen (1924–2013), New Zealand cricketer
- Victor Guillen (1892–1968), Trinidadian cricket umpire

== See also ==
- Murder of Imette St. Guillen
- Guillén
- Quillen
