= 2021 T20 Blast =

Cricket tournament

2021 Vitality Blast
- Dates: 9 June – 18 September 2021
- Administrator: England and Wales Cricket Board
- Cricket format: Twenty20
- Tournament format(s): Group stage and knockout
- Champions: Kent Spitfires (2nd title)
- Participants: 18
- Matches: 133
- Most runs: Josh Inglis (531) (Leicestershire Foxes)
- Most wickets: Naveen-ul-Haq (26) (Leicestershire Foxes)
- Official website: Vitality Blast

The 2021 Vitality Blast was the nineteenth edition of the T20 Blast currently known as the Vitality Blast, a professional Twenty20 cricket league played in England and Wales. run by the England and Wales Cricket Board (ECB), that was branded as the Vitality Blast due to the tournament's sponsorship deal. The Notts Outlaws were the defending champions.

In June 2021, Samit Patel, playing for the Notts Outlaws, became the first English player to do the double in T20 cricket of taking 250 wickets and scoring 5,000 runs.

In July 2021, Derbyshire's match against Essex in the 2021 County Championship was abandoned before the start of day two due to a positive COVID-19 case in the squad. As a result, Derbyshire's final two T20 Blast group-stage games, against the Northants Steelbacks and the Yorkshire Vikings, were also cancelled. Therefore, the North Group qualifications were decided based on an average points per completed match basis.

Following matches completed on 9 July 2021, the Notts Outlaws were the first team to qualify from the North Group for the quarter-finals. On the same day, they were joined by the Kent Spitfires from the South Group. After the matches completed on 16 July 2021, the Yorkshire Vikings from the North Group had qualified, along with Somerset from the South Group. On 17 July 2021, Lancashire Lightning won the Roses Match against the Yorkshire Vikings to qualify from the North Group. On the final day of group stage matches, the Birmingham Bears from the North Group, and the Sussex Sharks and the Hampshire Hawks from the South Group had all qualified for the quarter-finals.

In the first quarter-final match, the Sussex Sharks beat the Yorkshire Vikings to become the first team to reach Finals Day. The Hampshire Hawks reached the Finals Day, after they knocked out defending champions the Notts Outlaws in the second quarter-final match. Somerset became the third team to reach Finals Day, after they defeated the Lancashire Lightning in their quarter-final match. In the last quarter-final match, the Kent Spitfires beat the Birmingham Bears to progress to the Finals Day. It was the first time in the tournament's history that all the teams taking part in Finals Day had come from the South Group.

On Finals Day, Somerset beat Hampshire Hawks by two wickets in the first semi-final to advance into the final. In the second semi-final, Kent Spitfires beat the Sussex Sharks by 21 runs to advance. It was the first time that Kent had reached the domestic T20 final since the 2008 tournament. In the final, the Kent Spitfires beat Somerset by 25 runs to win the tournament and their second domestic T20 title.

== Format ==
Each county played seven matches at home, and seven matches away, with the top four counties in each group progressing to the Quarter-finals. The top two ranked counties from each group will host the Quarter-finals, to play against the lower-seeded team in other group.

== Teams ==
The teams were placed into the following groups:

- North Group: Birmingham Bears, Derbyshire Falcons, Durham, Lancashire Lightning, Leicestershire Foxes, Northants Steelbacks, Notts Outlaws, Worcestershire Rapids, Yorkshire Vikings
- South Group: Essex Eagles, Glamorgan, Gloucestershire, Hampshire Hawks, Kent Spitfires, Middlesex, Somerset, Surrey, Sussex Sharks

=== North Group ===
Team	Home ground	Coach	Captain
Birmingham Bears	Edgbaston, Birmingham	(England) Mark Robinson	(England) Will Rhodes
Derbyshire Falcons	County Ground, Derby	(Zimbabwe) Dave Houghton	(England) Billy Godleman (England) Matt Critchley (from 23 June)
Durham	Riverside Ground, Chester-le-Street	(New Zealand) James Franklin	(Australia) Cameron Bancroft
Lancashire Lightning	Old Trafford, Manchester	(England) Glen Chapple	(South Africa) Dane Vilas
Leicestershire Foxes	Grace Road, Leicester	(England) Paul Nixon	(Netherlands) Colin Ackermann
Northants Steelbacks	County Ground, Northampton	(England) David Ripley	(England) Josh Cobb
Notts Outlaws	Trent Bridge, Nottingham	(England) Peter Moores	(England) Steven Mullaney
Worcestershire Rapids	New Road, Worcester	(England) Alex Gidman	(England) Ed Barnard
Yorkshire Vikings	Headingley, Leeds	(England) Andrew Gale	(England) David Willey

=== South Group ===
Team	Home ground	Coach	Captain
Essex Eagles	County Ground, Chelmsford	(England) Anthony McGrath	(South Africa) Simon Harmer
Glamorgan	Sophia Gardens, Cardiff	(England) Matthew Maynard	(South Africa) Chris Cooke
Gloucestershire	County Ground, Bristol (Note: 2 out of 7 home matches of Gloucestershire in group stage were played at College Ground, Cheltenham.)	(Australia) Ian Harvey (interim)	(England) Jack Taylor
Hampshire Hawks	Rose Bowl, Southampton	(South Africa) Adrian Birrell	(England) James Vince
Kent Spitfires	St Lawrence Ground, Canterbury	(England) Matt Walker	(England) Sam Billings
Middlesex	Lord's, London (Note: 3 out of 7 home matches of Middlesex in group stage were played at Radlett Cricket Club, Radlett.)	(Australia) Stuart Law	(England) Eoin Morgan
Somerset	County Ground, Taunton	(England) Jason Kerr	(England) Lewis Gregory
Surrey	The Oval, London	(England) Vikram Solanki	(England) Gareth Batty
Sussex Sharks	County Ground, Hove	(England) James Kirtley	(England) Luke Wright

== Results and standings ==
=== North Group ===
Pos	Team	Pld	W	L	T	NR	Pts	NRR
1	Notts Outlaws	14	9	2	3	0	21	1.503
2	Yorkshire Vikings (Note: Yorkshire Vikings finished above Lancashire Lightning on average points per completed match basis.)	13	7	5	0	1	15	0.305
3	Lancashire Lightning	14	7	5	1	1	16	0.205
4	Birmingham Bears	14	7	6	0	1	15	0.006
5	Worcestershire Rapids	14	6	6	1	1	14	−0.629
6	Leicestershire Foxes	14	6	8	0	0	12	−0.019
7	Durham	14	5	8	0	1	11	−0.228
8	Derbyshire Falcons (Note: Derbyshire Falcons' two matches scheduled to play against Northants Steelbacks (16 July) and Yorkshire Vikings (18 July) were cancelled due to COVID-19. As a result, the North Group qualifications were decided on an average points per completed match basis.)	12	4	7	1	0	9	−0.326
9	Northants Steelbacks	13	4	8	0	1	9	−0.871

Source: BBC Sport, England and Wales Cricket Board
Notes:

Advance to quarter-finals

==== June ====
9 June 2021
14:30
Scorecard

Derbyshire Falcons; 168/7 (20 overs)	v	Lancashire Lightning; 171/4 (19.3 overs)
Luis Reece 59 (32); Matt Parkinson 3/28 (4 overs)		Liam Livingstone 94* (58); Fynn Hudson-Prentice 2/9 (1 over)

Lancashire Lightning won by 6 wickets
Old Trafford, Manchester
Umpires: Paul Baldwin and Tim Robinson
Player of the match: Liam Livingstone (Lancs)

- Derbyshire Falcons won the toss and elected to bat.
- Points: Lancashire Lightning 2, Derbyshire Falcons 0.

9 June 2021
17:30 (D/N)
Scorecard

Worcestershire Rapids; 152/6 (20 overs)	v	Notts Outlaws; 152/8 (20 overs)
Jake Libby 52* (43); Matt Carter 2/22 (3 overs)		Joe Clarke 45 (21); Moeen Ali 2/15 (4 overs)

Match tied
New Road, Worcester
Umpires: Alex Wharf and Ian Gould
Player of the match: Joe Clarke (Notts)

- Notts Outlaws won the toss and elected to field.
- Points: Notts Outlaws 1, Worcestershire Rapids 1.

10 June 2021
18:30 (D/N)
Scorecard

Birmingham Bears; 144/8 (20 overs)	v	Yorkshire Vikings; 147/4 (18.3 overs)
Sam Hain 59 (41); Jordan Thompson 3/23 (4 overs)		Jonny Bairstow 34 (22); Danny Briggs 2/28 (4 overs)

Yorkshire Vikings won by 6 wickets
Headingley, Leeds
Umpires: Chris Watts and David Millns
Player of the match: Jordan Thompson (Yorks)

- Yorkshire Vikings won the toss and elected to field.
- Points: Yorkshire Vikings 2, Birmingham Bears 0.

10 June 2021
18:30 (D/N)
Scorecard

Lancashire Lightning; 172/8 (20 overs)	v	Leicestershire Foxes; 156/5 (20 overs)
Finn Allen 73* (51); Gavin Griffiths 4/24 (4 overs)		Scott Steel 54* (52); Matt Parkinson 2/30 (4 overs)

Lancashire Lightning won by 16 runs
Old Trafford, Manchester
Umpires: Ian Blackwell and Steve O'Shaughnessy
Player of the match: Finn Allen (Lancs)

- Lancashire Lightning won the toss and elected to bat.
- Rishi Patel (Leics) made his T20 debut.
- Points: Lancashire Lightning 2, Leicestershire Foxes 0.

11 June 2021
18:30 (D/N)
Scorecard

Durham; 181/8 (20 overs)	v	Yorkshire Vikings; 161/6 (20 overs)
Brydon Carse 51* (31); Jordan Thompson 4/44 (4 overs)		Jonny Bairstow 67 (50); Ben Raine 2/17 (3 overs)

Durham won by 20 runs
Riverside Ground, Chester-le-Street
Umpires: Ian Blackwell and Neil Mallender
Player of the match: Brydon Carse (Durham)

- Yorkshire Vikings won the toss and elected to field.
- Points: Durham 2, Yorkshire Vikings 0.

11 June 2021
18:30 (D/N)
Scorecard

Birmingham Bears; 229/5 (20 overs)	v	Notts Outlaws; 211/9 (20 overs)
Ed Pollock 62 (34); Matt Carter 2/26 (4 overs)		Ben Duckett 51 (27); Carlos Brathwaite 2/28 (3 overs)

Birmingham Bears won by 18 runs
Trent Bridge, Nottingham
Umpires: Paul Baldwin and Steve O'Shaughnessy
Player of the match: Carlos Brathwaite (B'ham)

- Notts Outlaws won the toss and elected to field.
- Points: Birmingham Bears 2, Notts Outlaws 0.

11 June 2021
18:30 (D/N)
Scorecard

Derbyshire Falcons; 209/6 (20 overs)	v	Leicestershire Foxes; 186 (19 overs)
Matt Critchley 80* (45); Naveen-ul-Haq 3/26 (4 overs)		Rishi Patel 35 (19); Logan Van Beek 3/37 (4 overs)

Derbyshire Falcons won by 23 runs
Grace Road, Leicester
Umpires: David Millns and Rob White
Player of the match: Matt Critchley (Derbs)

- Leicestershire Foxes won the toss and elected to field.
- Harry Came (Derbs) made his T20 debut.
- Points: Derbyshire Falcons 2, Leicestershire Foxes 0.

11 June 2021
19:00 (N)
Scorecard

Worcestershire Rapids; 185/7 (20 overs)	v	Northants Steelbacks; 153/9 (20 overs)
Moeen Ali 52 (30); Ben Sanderson 3/21 (3 overs)		Saif Zaib 36 (21); Moeen Ali 2/21 (4 overs)

Worcestershire Rapids won by 32 runs
County Cricket Ground, Northampton
Umpires: Russell Warren and Tim Robinson
Player of the match: Moeen Ali (Worcs)

- Northants Steelbacks won the toss and elected to field.
- Points: Worcestershire Rapids 2, Northants Steelbacks 0.

13 June 2021
14:30
Scorecard

Lancashire Lightning; 132/4 (20 overs)	v	Worcestershire Rapids; 133/2 (17.2 overs)
Jos Buttler 55 (46); Charlie Morris 2/25 (4 overs)		Brett D'Oliveira 61* (45); Matt Parkinson 2/32 (4 overs)

Worcestershire Rapids won by 8 wickets
New Road, Worcester
Umpires: Nigel Llong and Paul Pollard
Player of the match: Brett D'Oliveira (Worcs)

- Lancashire Lightning won the toss and elected to bat.
- Points: Worcestershire Rapids 2, Lancashire Lightning 0.

13 June 2021
14:30
Scorecard

Derbyshire Falcons; 160/8 (20 overs)	v	Birmingham Bears; 161/7 (19 overs)
Fynn Hudson-Prentice 41 (22); Carlos Brathwaite 2/24 (4 overs)		Dan Mousley 56 (40); Matt Critchley 2/21 (4 overs)

Birmingham Bears won by 3 wickets
County Cricket Ground, Derby
Umpires: Mike Burns and Neil Mallender
Player of the match: Dan Mousley (B'ham)

- Derbyshire Falcons won the toss and elected to bat.
- Points: Birmingham Bears 2, Derbyshire Falcons 0.

13 June 2021
14:30
Scorecard

Leicestershire Foxes; 168/9 (20 overs)	v	Durham; 170/8 (19 overs)
Scott Steel 53 (38); Ben Raine 3/19 (4 overs)		Ned Eckersley 50* (36); Arron Lilley 3/26 (4 overs)

Durham won by 2 wickets
Grace Road, Leicester
Umpires: Nick Cook and Russell Warren
Player of the match: Ned Eckersley (Durham)

- Leicestershire Foxes won the toss and elected to bat.
- Louis Kimber (Leics) made his T20 debut.
- Points: Durham 2, Leicestershire Foxes 0.

13 June 2021
16:15 (D/N)
Scorecard

Notts Outlaws; 214/7 (20 overs)	v	Northants Steelbacks; 200/7 (20 overs)
Joe Clarke 136 (65); Wayne Parnell 2/30 (4 overs)		Josh Cobb 62 (32); Jake Ball 3/58 (4 overs)

Notts Outlaws won by 14 runs
County Cricket Ground, Northampton
Umpires: Ian Blackwell and Paul Baldwin
Player of the match: Joe Clarke (Notts)

- Notts Outlaws won the toss and elected to bat.
- Lyndon James (Notts) made his T20 debut.
- Points: Notts Outlaws 2, Northants Steelbacks 0.

15 June 2021
18:30 (D/N)
Scorecard

Yorkshire Vikings; 240/4 (20 overs)	v	Leicestershire Foxes; 222/8 (20 overs)
Jonny Bairstow 82 (45); Naveen-ul-Haq 2/49 (4 overs)		Josh Inglis 82 (37); David Willey 3/44 (4 overs)

Yorkshire Vikings won by 18 runs
Headingley, Leeds
Umpires: Neil Pratt and Paul Pollard
Player of the match: Jonny Bairstow (Yorks)

- Yorkshire Vikings won the toss and elected to bat.
- Points: Yorkshire Vikings 2, Leicestershire Foxes 0.

15 June 2021
18:30 (D/N)
Scorecard

Notts Outlaws; 195/5 (20 overs)	v	Durham; 182/8 (20 overs)
Alex Hales 96* (54); Ben Raine 2/29 (4 overs)		David Bedingham 65 (42); Matt Carter 3/43 (4 overs)

Notts Outlaws won by 13 runs
Riverside Ground, Chester-le-Street
Umpires: Tim Robinson and Mike Burns
Player of the match: Alex Hales (Notts)

- Notts Outlaws won the toss and elected to bat.
- Points: Notts Outlaws 2, Durham 0.

15 June 2021
18:30 (D/N)
Scorecard

Birmingham Bears; 170/3 (20 overs)	v	Northants Steelbacks; 115 (18.5 overs)
Sam Hain 69* (42); Graeme White 1/19 (4 overs)		Ricardo Vasconcelos 36 (27); Jake Lintott 4/20 (4 overs)

Birmingham Bears won by 55 runs
County Cricket Ground, Northampton
Umpires: Ben Debenham and Graham Lloyd
Player of the match: Jake Lintott (B'ham)

- Birmingham Bears won the toss and elected to bat.
- Points: Birmingham Bears 2, Northants Steelbacks 0.

15 June 2021
19:00 (N)
Scorecard

Derbyshire Falcons; 196/5 (20 overs)	v	Lancashire Lightning; 197/3 (18.2 overs)
Leus du Plooy 92 (56); Tom Bailey 3/34 (4 overs)		Alex Davies 83* (54); Fynn Hudson-Prentice 2/40 (4 overs)

Lancashire Lightning won by 7 wickets
County Cricket Ground, Derby
Umpires: David Millns and Rob White
Player of the match: Alex Davies (Lancs)

- Derbyshire Falcons won the toss and elected to bat.
- Conor McKerr (Derbs) made his T20 debut.
- Points: Lancashire Lightning 2, Derbyshire Falcons 0.

16 June 2021
17:30 (D/N)
Scorecard

Yorkshire Vikings; 216/6 (20 overs)	v	Worcestershire Rapids; 122 (16.3 overs)
Jonny Bairstow 112 (51); Ben Dwarshuis 4/31 (4 overs)		Moeen Ali 39 (29); Adil Rashid 3/32 (4 overs)

Yorkshire Vikings won by 94 runs
New Road, Worcester
Umpires: Martin Saggers and Rob White
Player of the match: Jonny Bairstow (Yorks)

- Worcestershire Rapids won the toss and elected to field.
- Points: Yorkshire Vikings 2, Worcestershire Rapids 0.

16 June 2021
18:45 (D/N)
Scorecard

Birmingham Bears; 190/7 (20 overs)	v	Leicestershire Foxes; 155 (20 overs)
Will Rhodes 79 (40); Ben Mike 4/22 (2 overs)		Scott Steel 46 (38); Tim Bresnan 3/29 (4 overs)

Birmingham Bears won by 35 runs
Grace Road, Leicester
Umpires: David Millns and Neil Bainton
Player of the match: Will Rhodes (B'ham)

- Leicestershire Foxes won the toss and elected to field.
- Points: Birmingham Bears 2, Leicestershire Foxes 0.

17 June 2021
19:00 (N)
Scorecard

Lancashire Lightning; 151/6 (20 overs)	v	Durham; 153/4 (17.4 overs)
Liam Livingstone 65 (54); Matty Potts 3/34 (4 overs)		David Bedingham 58 (39); Matt Parkinson 2/30 (4 overs)

Durham won by 6 wickets
Riverside Ground, Chester-le-Street
Umpires: Mike Burns and Neil Mallender
Player of the match: David Bedingham (Durham)

- Lancashire Lightning won the toss and elected to bat.
- Steven Croft (Lancashire Lightning) played in his 200th T20 match.
- Points: Durham 2, Lancashire Lightning 0.

17 June 2021
19:00 (N)
Scorecard

Northants Steelbacks; 141/8 (20 overs)	v	Derbyshire Falcons; 143/5 (18.2 overs)
Ricardo Vasconcelos 38 (40); Conor McKerr 2/23 (3 overs)		Leus du Plooy 48* (38); Wayne Parnell 1/15 (4 overs)

Derbyshire Falcons won by 5 wickets
County Cricket Ground, Derby
Umpires: Paul Pollard and Neil Pratt
Player of the match: Leus du Plooy (Derbs)

- Northants Steelbacks won the toss and elected to bat.
- Points: Derbyshire Falcons 2, Northants Steelbacks 0.

18 June 2021
17:30 (D/N)
Scorecard

Worcestershire Rapids	v	Northants Steelbacks

Match abandoned
New Road, Worcester
Umpires: Nigel Llong and Paul Baldwin

- No toss.
- No play was possible due to rain.
- Points: Worcestershire Rapids 1, Northants Steelbacks 1.

18 June 2021
18:00 (D/N)
Scorecard

Notts Outlaws; 152/6 (15 overs)	v	Derbyshire Falcons; 150/6 (15 overs)
Samit Patel 64* (32); Logan van Beek 3/22 (3 overs)		Luis Reece 56 (26); Samit Patel 2/14 (3 overs)

Notts Outlaws won by 2 runs (DLS method)
Trent Bridge, Nottingham
Umpires: Neil Pratt and Nick Cook
Player of the match: Samit Patel (Notts)

- Derbyshire Falcons won the toss and elected to field.
- The match was reduced to 15 overs per side due to rain.
- Sol Budinger (Notts) made his T20 debut.
- Points: Notts Outlaws 2, Derbyshire Falcons 0.

18 June 2021
18:30 (D/N)
Scorecard

Birmingham Bears	v	Lancashire Lightning

Match abandoned
Edgbaston, Birmingham
Umpires: Ian Ramage and Neil Mallender

- No toss.
- No play was possible due to rain.
- Points: Birmingham Bears 1, Lancashire Lightning 1.

18 June 2021
18:30 (D/N)
Scorecard

Yorkshire Vikings	v	Durham

Match abandoned
Headingley, Leeds
Umpires: Graham Lloyd and Tim Robinson

- No toss.
- No play was possible due to rain.
- Points: Yorkshire Vikings 1, Durham 1.

20 June 2021
14:30
Scorecard

Yorkshire Vikings; 174/6 (20 overs)	v	Derbyshire Falcons; 135 (19 overs)
Joe Root 49 (36); George Scrimshaw 3/30 (4 overs)		Fynn Hudson-Prentice 34 (29); Lockie Ferguson 3/21 (4 overs); Dom Bess 3/21 (4 overs)

Yorkshire Vikings won by 39 runs
Headingley, Leeds
Umpires: Ian Ramage and Peter Hartley
Player of the match: Harry Brook (Yorks)

- Derbyshire Falcons won the toss and elected to field.
- Points: Yorkshire Vikings 2, Derbyshire Falcons 0.

20 June 2021
14:30
Scorecard

Durham; 185/4 (20 overs)	v	Birmingham Bears; 163/8 (20 overs)
Cameron Bancroft 76* (53); Craig Miles 1/13 (2 overs)		Will Rhodes 36 (25); Brydon Carse 3/30 (4 overs)

Durham won by 22 runs
Riverside Ground, Chester-le-Street
Umpires: Graham Lloyd and James Middlebrook
Player of the match: Cameron Bancroft (Durham)

- Durham won the toss and elected to bat.
- Jacob Bethell (B'ham) made his T20 debut.
- Points: Durham 2, Birmingham Bears 0.

20 June 2021
14:30
Scorecard

Notts Outlaws; 172 (20 overs)	v	Lancashire Lightning; 172/4 (20 overs)
Tom Moores 48 (40); Danny Lamb 3/23 (4 overs)		Keaton Jennings 88 (61); Samit Patel 1/18 (4 overs)

Match tied
Old Trafford, Manchester
Umpires: Neil Mallender and Neil Pratt
Player of the match: Keaton Jennings (Lancs)

- Notts Outlaws won the toss and elected to bat.
- Points: Notts Outlaws 1, Lancashire Lightning 1.

20 June 2021
14:30
Scorecard

Leicestershire Foxes; 200/2 (20 overs)	v	Northants Steelbacks; 166/7 (20 overs)
Josh Inglis 103* (62); Graeme White 1/36 (3 overs)		Rob Keogh 50* (29); Callum Parkinson 2/19 (4 overs)

Leicestershire Foxes won by 34 runs
County Cricket Ground, Northampton
Umpires: Nick Cook and Russell Warren
Player of the match: Josh Inglis (Leics)

- Leicestershire Foxes won the toss and elected to bat.
- Josh Inglis (Leicestershire Foxes) scored his first century in a T20 match.
- Points: Leicestershire Foxes 2, Northants Steelbacks 0.

22 June 2021
18:00 (D/N)
Scorecard

Worcestershire Rapids; 86/8 (20 overs)	v	Notts Outlaws; 89/0 (6.2 overs)
Jake Libby 29 (33); Samit Patel 3/4 (4 overs)		Alex Hales 60* (24)

Notts Outlaws won by 10 wickets
Trent Bridge, Nottingham
Umpires: Ben Debenham and Ian Blackwell
Player of the match: Samit Patel (Notts)

- Notts Outlaws won the toss and elected to field.
- Points: Notts Outlaws 2, Worcestershire Rapids 0.

22 June 2021
19:00 (N)
Scorecard

Leicestershire Foxes; 174/8 (20 overs)	v	Derbyshire Falcons; 132 (18.4 overs)
Louis Kimber 53 (28); Fynn Hudson-Prentice 3/36 (3 overs)		Harry Came 40 (31); Naveen-ul-Haq 2/17 (3.4 overs)

Leicestershire Foxes won by 42 runs
County Cricket Ground, Derby
Umpires: Tim Robinson and Tom Lungley
Player of the match: Louis Kimber (Leics)

- Derbyshire Falcons won the toss and elected to field.
- Points: Leicestershire Foxes 2, Derbyshire Falcons 0.

23 June 2021
18:30 (D/N)
Scorecard

Yorkshire Vikings; 191/5 (20 overs)	v	Worcestershire Rapids; 179/5 (20 overs)
Harry Brook 83* (54); Dillon Pennington 4/24 (4 overs)		Riki Wessels 77 (45); Matthew Fisher 2/33 (4 overs)

Yorkshire Vikings won by 12 runs
Headingley, Leeds
Umpires: Neil Pratt and Steve O'Shaughnessy
Player of the match: Jordan Thompson (Yorks)

- Yorkshire Vikings won the toss and elected to bat.
- Points: Yorkshire Vikings 2, Worcestershire Rapids 0.

23 June 2021
18:30 (D/N)
Scorecard

Durham; 157/5 (20 overs)	v	Northants Steelbacks; 158/1 (17.5 overs)
Sean Dickson 51* (37); Mohammad Nabi 2/24 (4 overs)		Ricardo Vasconcelos 78* (57); Liam Trevaskis 1/25 (4 overs)

Northants Steelbacks won by 9 wickets
Riverside Ground, Chester-le-Street
Umpires: Hassan Adnan and Peter Hartley
Player of the match: Adam Rossington (Northants)

- Durham won the toss and elected to bat.
- Freddie Heldreich (Northants) made his T20 debut.
- Points: Northants Steelbacks 2, Durham 0.

24 June 2021
18:30 (D/N)
Scorecard

Birmingham Bears; 167/9 (20 overs)	v	Derbyshire Falcons; 170/5 (19.1 overs)
Ed Pollock 46 (21); George Scrimshaw 3/23 (4 overs)		Tom Wood 63* (48); Carlos Brathwaite 2/27 (4 overs)

Derbyshire Falcons won by 5 wickets
Edgbaston, Birmingham
Umpires: Ben Debenham and Paul Pollard
Player of the match: Leus du Plooy (Derbs)

- Derbyshire Falcons won the toss and elected to field.
- Points: Derbyshire Falcons 2, Birmingham Bears 0.

25 June 2021
17:30 (D/N)
Scorecard

Durham; 178/8 (20 overs)	v	Worcestershire Rapids; 181/2 (19.3 overs)
David Bedingham 44 (26); Charlie Morris 3/37 (4 overs)		Jake Libby 78* (55); Matty Potts 2/41 (3.3 overs)

Worcestershire Rapids won by 8 wickets
New Road, Worcester
Umpires: Billy Taylor and Ian Ramage
Player of the match: Jake Libby (Worcs)

- Durham won the toss and elected to bat.
- Points: Worcestershire Rapids 2, Durham 0.

25 June 2021
18:30 (D/N)
Scorecard

Lancashire Lightning; 130/7 (20 overs)	v	Northants Steelbacks; 131/3 (18.2 overs)
Steven Croft 35* (37); Wayne Parnell 2/28 (4 overs)		Ricardo Vasconcelos 41 (38); Tom Hartley 1/28 (4 overs)

Northants Steelbacks won by 7 wickets
County Cricket Ground, Northampton
Umpires: Ben Debenham and Ian Gould
Player of the match: Mohammad Nabi (Northants)

- Lancashire Lightning won the toss and elected to bat.
- Points: Northants Steelbacks 2, Lancashire Lightning 0.

25 June 2021
18:30 (D/N)
Scorecard

Leicestershire Foxes; 207/3 (20 overs)	v	Yorkshire Vikings; 173 (19.5 overs)
Arron Lilley 99* (55); Joe Root 1/33 (3 overs)		Gary Ballance 34 (24); Gavin Griffiths 1/38 (4 overs)

Leicestershire Foxes won by 34 runs
Grace Road, Leicester
Umpires: Hassan Adnan and Neil Bainton
Player of the match: Arron Lilley (Leics)

- Leicestershire Foxes won the toss and elected to bat.
- Points: Leicestershire Foxes 2, Yorkshire Vikings 0.

25 June 2021
19:00 (N)
Scorecard

Notts Outlaws; 137/9 (20 overs)	v	Derbyshire Falcons; 137/9 (20 overs)
Joe Clarke 36 (16); Mattie McKiernan 3/9 (2 overs)		Luis Reece 51 (30); Jake Ball 1/42 (4 overs)

Match tied
County Cricket Ground, Derby
Umpires: Neil Pratt and Peter Hartley
Player of the match: Matt Critchley (Derbs)

- Derbyshire Falcons won the toss and elected to field.
- Points: Notts Outlaws 1, Derbyshire Falcons 1.

26 June 2021
14:30
Scorecard

Durham; 164/8 (20 overs)	v	Birmingham Bears; 130 (18.3 overs)
Cameron Bancroft 60 (45); Carlos Brathwaite 3/32 (4 overs)		Will Rhodes 45 (27); Ben Stokes 4/27 (3 overs)

Durham won by 34 runs
Edgbaston, Birmingham
Umpires: Chris Watts and Peter Hartley
Player of the match: Ben Stokes (Durham)

- Birmingham Bears won the toss and elected to field.
- Points: Durham 2, Birmingham Bears 0.

26 June 2021
15:00
Scorecard

Notts Outlaws; 173/6 (20 overs)	v	Lancashire Lightning; 166/7 (20 overs)
Alex Hales 101* (66); Saqib Mahmood 2/35 (4 overs)		Steven Croft 41 (30); Matt Carter 3/17 (3 overs)

Notts Outlaws won by 7 runs
Trent Bridge, Nottingham
Umpires: Billy Taylor and Neil Bainton
Player of the match: Alex Hales (Notts)

- Lancashire Lightning won the toss and elected to field.
- Points: Notts Outlaws 2, Lancashire Lightning 0.

26 June 2021
18:30 (D/N)
Scorecard

Yorkshire Vikings; 224/3 (20 overs)	v	Northants Steelbacks; 142 (19.3 overs)
Jordan Thompson 74 (35); Mohammad Nabi 1/23 (4 overs)		Rob Keogh 36 (28); Dom Bess 3/17 (4 overs)

Yorkshire Vikings won by 82 runs
Headingley, Leeds
Umpires: Paul Pollard and James Middlebrook
Player of the match: Jordan Thompson (Yorks)

- Yorkshire Vikings won the toss and elected to bat.
- Points: Yorkshire Vikings 2, Northants Steelbacks 0.

27 June 2021
14:30
Scorecard

Leicestershire Foxes; 156/7 (20 overs)	v	Worcestershire Rapids; 157/3 (19.1 overs)
Lewis Hill 59 (33); Dillon Pennington 2/20 (4 overs)		Brett D'Oliveira 69 (53); Callum Parkinson 1/20 (4 overs)

Worcestershire Rapids won by 7 wickets
New Road, Worcester
Umpires: Neil Pratt and Rob Bailey
Player of the match: Brett D'Oliveira (Worcs)

- Worcestershire Rapids won the toss and elected to field.
- Points: Worcestershire Rapids 2, Leicestershire Foxes 0.

29 June 2021
18:30 (D/N)
Scorecard

Leicestershire Foxes; 138 (19.5 overs)	v	Northants Steelbacks; 141/5 (18.2 overs)
Scott Steel 44 (56); Freddie Heldreich 2/17 (4 overs)		Rob Keogh 34* (38); Scott Steel 2/17 (4 overs)

Northants Steelbacks won by 5 wickets
Grace Road, Leicester
Umpires: Peter Hartley and Tom Lungley
Player of the match: Freddie Heldreich (Northants)

- Leicestershire Foxes won the toss and elected to bat.
- Points: Northants Steelbacks 2, Leicestershire Foxes 0.

30 June 2021
18:30 (D/N)
Scorecard

Yorkshire Vikings; 81 (15.5 overs)	v	Birmingham Bears; 86/0 (8.3 overs)
Harry Brook 28* (24); Carlos Brathwaite 3/7 (2 overs)		Adam Hose 46* (31)

Birmingham Bears won by 10 wickets
Edgbaston, Birmingham
Umpires: Neil Bainton and Tom Lungley
Player of the match: Carlos Brathwaite (B'ham)

- Yorkshire Vikings won the toss and elected to bat.
- Points: Birmingham Bears 2, Yorkshire Vikings 0.

30 June 2021
18:30 (D/N)
Scorecard

Northants Steelbacks; 173/5 (20 overs)	v	Durham; 143 (20 overs)
Ben Curran 62 (33); Ben Stokes 2/37 (4 overs)		Matty Potts 40* (26); Graeme White 4/26 (4 overs)

Northants Steelbacks won by 30 runs
County Cricket Ground, Northampton
Umpires: Ben Debenham and Nick Cook
Player of the match: Ben Curran (Northants)

- Durham won the toss and elected to field.
- Jack Campbell and Harry Crawshaw (Durham) both made their T20 debuts.
- Points: Northants Steelbacks 2, Durham 0.

==== July ====
1 July 2021
18:30 (D/N)
Scorecard

Lancashire Lightning; 159/6 (20 overs)	v	Worcestershire Rapids; 125 (18.3 overs)
Rob Jones 49* (33); Ben Dwarshuis 2/30 (4 overs)		Ben Cox 36 (30); Tom Hartley 4/16 (4 overs)

Lancashire Lightning won by 34 runs
Old Trafford, Manchester
Umpires: Hassan Adnan and Ian Blackwell
Player of the match: Rob Jones (Lancs)

- Lancashire Lightning won the toss and elected to bat.
- Points: Lancashire Lightning 2, Worcestershire Rapids 0.

1 July 2021
18:30 (D/N)
Scorecard

Leicestershire Foxes; 154 (20 overs)	v	Notts Outlaws; 156/4 (17.5 overs)
Harry Swindells 36 (30); Calvin Harrison 3/20 (4 overs)		Samit Patel 63* (50); Callum Parkinson 2/32 (4 overs)

Notts Outlaws won by 6 wickets
Trent Bridge, Nottingham
Umpires: Billy Taylor and Tom Lungley
Player of the match: Samit Patel (Notts)

- Notts Outlaws won the toss and elected to field.
- Points: Notts Outlaws 2, Leicestershire Foxes 0.

2 July 2021
18:30 (D/N)
Scorecard

Notts Outlaws; 177/9 (20 overs)	v	Birmingham Bears; 63 (13.4 overs)
Samit Patel 41 (30); Jake Lintott 3/28 (4 overs)		Rob Yates 24 (23); Jake Ball 4/11 (2.4 overs)

Notts Outlaws won by 114 runs
Edgbaston, Birmingham
Umpires: Hassan Adnan and Tom Lungley
Player of the match: Samit Patel (Notts)

- Birmingham Bears won the toss and elected to field.
- Points: Notts Outlaws 2, Birmingham Bears 0.

2 July 2021
18:30 (D/N)
Scorecard

Yorkshire Vikings; 180/4 (20 overs)	v	Lancashire Lightning; 171/8 (20 overs)
Harry Brook 91* (50); Luke Wells 1/16 (2 overs)		Rob Jones 61* (48); Lockie Ferguson 4/24 (4 overs)

Yorkshire Vikings won by 9 runs
Headingley, Leeds
Umpires: Billy Taylor and Nick Cook
Player of the match: Harry Brook (Yorks)

- Yorkshire Vikings won the toss and elected to bat.
- Harry Duke (Yorks) made his T20 debut.

2 July 2021
18:30 (D/N)
Scorecard

Durham; 115/4 (15.1 overs)	v	Leicestershire Foxes; 88/2 (8.2 overs)
Graham Clark 40 (33); Naveen-ul-Haq 2/14 (2 overs)		Colin Ackermann 36* (21); Ben Stokes 1/15 (2 overs)

Leicestershire Foxes won by 8 wickets (DLS method)
Riverside Ground, Chester-le-Street
Umpires: Paul Baldwin and Rob White
Player of the match: Colin Ackermann (Leics)

- Leicestershire Foxes won the toss and elected to field.
- Leicestershire Foxes were set a revised target of 88 runs from 9 overs due to rain.
- Points: Leicestershire Foxes 2, Durham 0.

2 July 2021
19:00 (N)
Scorecard

Worcestershire Rapids; 167/6 (20 overs)	v	Derbyshire Falcons; 153/8 (20 overs)
Brett D'Oliveira 43 (33); Matt Critchley 2/20 (4 overs)		Tom Wood 46 (35); Charlie Morris 3/21 (3 overs)

Worcestershire Rapids won by 14 runs
County Cricket Ground, Derby
Umpires: Ian Blackwell and James Middlebrook
Player of the match: Brett D'Oliveira (Worcs)

- Worcestershire Rapids won the toss and elected to bat.
- Points: Worcestershire Rapids 2, Derbyshire Falcons 0.

9 July 2021
17:30 (D/N)
Scorecard

Worcestershire Rapids; 174/6 (20 overs)	v	Birmingham Bears; 125 (18 overs)
Brett D'Oliveira 45 (25); Will Rhodes 4/32 (4 overs)		Ed Pollock 53 (35); Ish Sodhi 4/24 (4 overs)

Worcestershire Rapids won by 49 runs
New Road, Worcester
Umpires: Billy Taylor and Steve O'Shaughnessy
Player of the match: Brett D'Oliveira (Worcs)

- Worcestershire Rapids won the toss and elected to bat.
- Ryan Sidebottom (B'ham) made his T20 debut.
- Points: Worcestershire Rapids 2, Birmingham Bears 0.

9 July 2021
18:30 (D/N)
Scorecard

Northants Steelbacks; 142/8 (20 overs)	v	Lancashire Lightning; 144/2 (15.4 overs)
Rob Keogh 56 (48); Liam Hurt 3/22 (3 overs)		Finn Allen 66 (37); Freddie Heldreich 1/20 (4 overs)

Lancashire Lightning won by 8 wickets
Old Trafford, Manchester
Umpires: Neil Pratt and Peter Hartley
Player of the match: Finn Allen (Lancs)

- Northants Steelbacks won the toss and elected to bat.
- Points: Lancashire Lightning 2, Northants Steelbacks 0.

9 July 2021
18:30 (D/N)
Scorecard

Durham; 176/9 (20 overs)	v	Derbyshire Falcons; 180/4 (20 overs)
Sean Dickson 37* (31); Alex Thomson 3/23 (4 overs)		Leus du Plooy 47 (35); Paul van Meekeren 2/31 (4 overs)

Derbyshire Falcons won by 6 wickets
Riverside Ground, Chester-le-Street
Umpires: Neil Bainton and Paul Pollard
Player of the match: Matt Critchley (Derbs)

- Derbyshire Falcons won the toss and elected to field.
- Luke Doneathy (Durham) made his T20 debut.
- Points: Derbyshire Falcons 2, Durham 0.

9 July 2021
18:30 (D/N)
Scorecard

Yorkshire Vikings; 60/3 (7 overs)	v	Notts Outlaws; 65/0 (3.4 overs)
Jordan Thompson 28 (19); Dane Paterson 2/5 (1 over)		Alex Hales 31* (9)

Notts Outlaws won by 10 wickets
Trent Bridge, Nottingham
Umpires: Ian Ramage and Nigel Llong
Player of the match: Samit Patel (Notts)

- Yorkshire Vikings won the toss and elected to bat.
- The match was reduced to 7 overs per side due to rain.
- Points: Notts Outlaws 2, Yorkshire Vikings 0.

16 July 2021
18:30 (D/N)
Scorecard

Birmingham Bears; 169/5 (20 overs)	v	Worcestershire Rapids; 152/6 (20 overs)
Sam Hain 83* (53); Dillon Pennington 2/11 (2 overs)		Jake Libby 36 (34); Danny Briggs 2/18 (4 overs)

Birmingham Bears won by 17 runs
Edgbaston, Birmingham
Umpires: Nick Cook and Rob White
Player of the match: Sam Hain (B'ham)

- Birmingham Bears won the toss and elected to bat.
- Points: Birmingham Bears 2, Worcestershire Rapids 0.

16 July 2021
18:30 (D/N)
Scorecard

Lancashire Lightning; 199/5 (20 overs)	v	Durham; 193/5 (20 overs)
Finn Allen 66 (28); Scott Borthwick 2/30 (4 overs)		Sean Dickson 53 (33); Tom Hartley 2/35 (4 overs)

Lancashire Lightning won by 6 runs
Old Trafford, Manchester
Umpires: Michael Gough and James Middlebrook
Player of the match: Alex Davies (Lancs)

- Lancashire Lightning won the toss and elected to bat.
- Points: Lancashire Lightning 2, Durham 0.

16 July 2021
18:30 (D/N)
Scorecard

Northants Steelbacks	v	Derbyshire Falcons

Match cancelled
County Cricket Ground, Northampton

- The match was cancelled due to COVID-19.

16 July 2021
18:30 (D/N)
Scorecard

Notts Outlaws; 173 (19.2 overs)	v	Leicestershire Foxes; 177/8 (19.4 overs)
Joe Clarke 57 (27); Naveen-ul-Haq 3/33 (4 overs)		Josh Inglis 42 (19); Steven Mullaney 3/33 (4 overs)

Leicestershire Foxes won by 2 wickets
Grace Road, Leicester
Umpires: Chris Watts and Neil Mallender
Player of the match: Arron Lilley (Leics)

- Leicestershire Foxes won the toss and elected to field.
- Points: Leicestershire Foxes 2, Notts Outlaws 0.

17 July 2021
17:00 (D/N)
Scorecard

Yorkshire Vikings; 128/7 (20 overs)	v	Lancashire Lightning; 131/6 (19 overs)
Joe Root 32 (37); Luke Wood 4/20 (4 overs)		Luke Wells 30 (37); Matthew Waite 2/17 (3 overs)

Lancashire Lightning won by 4 wickets
Old Trafford, Manchester
Umpires: Russell Warren and Ian Blackwell
Player of the match: Luke Wood (Lancs)

- Yorkshire Vikings won the toss and elected to bat.
- Points: Lancashire Lightning 2, Yorkshire Vikings 0.

18 July 2021
14:30
Scorecard

Derbyshire Falcons	v	Yorkshire Vikings

Match cancelled
County Cricket Ground, Derby

- The match was cancelled due to COVID-19.

18 July 2021
14:30
Scorecard

Birmingham Bears; 191/5 (20 overs)	v	Northants Steelbacks; 177/8 (20 overs)
Chris Benjamin 60* (34); Mohammad Nabi 2/23 (4 overs)		Rob Keogh 55* (33); Will Rhodes 3/41 (4 overs)

Birmingham Bears won by 14 runs
Edgbaston, Birmingham
Umpires: Ian Blackwell and Tim Robinson
Player of the match: Chris Benjamin (B'ham)

- Birmingham Bears won the toss and elected to bat.
- Chris Benjamin (B'ham) and Emilio Gay (Northants) both made their T20 debuts.
- Points: Birmingham Bears 2, Northants Steelbacks 0.

18 July 2021
16:00
Scorecard

Notts Outlaws; 221/4 (20 overs)	v	Durham; 143 (16 overs)
Ben Duckett 74* (41); Paul van Meekeren 2/50 (4 overs)		Matty Potts 30 (13); Calvin Harrison 4/36 (4 overs)

Notts Outlaws won by 78 runs
Trent Bridge, Nottingham
Umpires: Nick Cook and Peter Hartley
Player of the match: Ben Duckett (Notts)

- Durham won the toss and elected to field.
- Points: Notts Outlaws 2, Durham 0.

18 July 2021
18:30 (D/N)
Scorecard

Worcestershire Rapids; 169/6 (20 overs)	v	Leicestershire Foxes; 171/3 (17.5 overs)
Ed Barnard 43* (24); Naveen-ul-Haq 2/32 (4 overs)		Josh Inglis 118* (61); Dillon Pennington 2/29 (4 overs)

Leicestershire Foxes won by 7 wickets
Grace Road, Leicester
Umpires: Neil Mallender and Tom Lungley
Player of the match: Josh Inglis (Leics)

- Worcestershire Rapids won the toss and elected to bat.
- Points: Leicestershire Foxes 2, Worcestershire Rapids 0.

=== South Group ===
Pos	Team	Pld	W	L	T	NR	Pts	NRR
1	Kent Spitfires	14	9	4	0	1	19	0.657
2	Somerset	14	8	4	0	2	18	0.371
3	Sussex Sharks	14	6	3	0	5	17	0.479
4	Hampshire Hawks	14	6	5	0	3	15	0.388
5	Surrey	14	6	5	0	3	15	0.332
6	Gloucestershire	14	6	6	0	2	14	0.201
7	Essex Eagles	14	5	8	0	1	11	−0.468
8	Middlesex	14	4	9	0	1	9	−0.389
9	Glamorgan	14	3	9	0	2	8	−1.371

Source: BBC Sport, England and Wales Cricket Board

Advance to quarter-finals

==== June ====
9 June 2021
18:30 (D/N)
Scorecard

Somerset; 185/7 (20 overs)	v	Essex Eagles; 187/7 (18.5 overs)
Ben Green 43* (30); Sam Cook 3/14 (3 overs)		James Neesham 53 (25); Marchant de Lange 3/35 (4 overs)

Essex Eagles won by 3 wickets
County Ground, Taunton
Umpires: Mike Burns and Russell Warren
Player of the match: James Neesham (Essex)

- Essex Eagles won the toss and elected to field.
- Points: Essex Eagles 2, Somerset 0.

9 June 2021
19:00 (N)
Scorecard

Kent Spitfires; 176/6 (20 overs)	v	Hampshire Hawks; 138/9 (20 overs)
Ollie Robinson 48 (36); Mason Crane 3/23 (4 overs)		Joe Weatherley 37 (22); Fred Klaassen 4/32 (4 overs)

Kent Spitfires won by 38 runs
St Lawrence Ground, Canterbury
Umpires: Hassan Adnan and Rob Bailey
Player of the match: Fred Klaassen (Kent)

- Hampshire Hawks won the toss and elected to field.
- James Logan (Kent) made his T20 debut.
- Points: Kent Spitfires 2, Hampshire Hawks 0.

10 June 2021
17:30 (D/N)
Scorecard

Gloucestershire; 179/6 (20 overs)	v	Glamorgan; 175/9 (20 overs)
Glenn Phillips 44 (32); Dan Douthwaite 3/28 (4 overs)		Marnus Labuschagne 93* (56); Benny Howell 3/39 (4 overs)

Gloucestershire won by 4 runs
Sophia Gardens, Cardiff
Umpires: Ian Gould and Nigel Llong
Player of the match: Marnus Labuschagne (Glam)

- Gloucestershire won the toss and elected to bat.
- Points: Gloucestershire 2, Glamorgan 0.

10 June 2021
19:00 (N)
Scorecard

Surrey; 223/7 (20 overs)	v	Middlesex; 169/9 (20 overs)
Will Jacks 70 (24); Nathan Sowter 3/40 (4 overs)		Paul Stirling 58 (28); Sam Curran 4/29 (4 overs)

Surrey won by 54 runs
Lord's, London
Umpires: Paul Pollard and Russell Warren
Player of the match: Will Jacks (Surrey)

- Middlesex won the toss and elected to field.
- Blake Cullen (Middx) made his T20 debut.
- Points: Surrey 2, Middlesex 0.

11 June 2021
18:30 (D/N)
Scorecard

Gloucestershire; 177/7 (20 overs)	v	Sussex Sharks; 178/5 (17.2 overs)
Glenn Phillips 42 (27); George Garton 3/19 (4 overs)		Phil Salt 77* (49); Josh Shaw 3/23 (4 overs)

Sussex Sharks won by 5 wickets
County Ground, Bristol
Umpires: Mark Newell and Nick Cook
Player of the match: Phil Salt (Sussex)

- Sussex Sharks won the toss and elected to field.
- Henry Crocombe and Archie Lenham (both Sussex) made their T20 debuts.
- Points: Sussex Sharks 2, Gloucestershire 0.

11 June 2021
18:30 (D/N)
Scorecard

Somerset; 187/6 (20 overs)	v	Surrey; 188/3 (16 overs)
Tom Abell 69 (44); Tom Curran 2/44 (4 overs)		Sam Curran 72* (36); Josh Davey 2/31 (3 overs)

Surrey won by 7 wickets
County Ground, Taunton
Umpires: Billy Taylor and Nigel Llong
Player of the match: Sam Curran (Surrey)

- Surrey won the toss and elected to field.
- Points: Surrey 2, Somerset 0.

11 June 2021
19:00 (N)
Scorecard

Kent Spitfires; 178/8 (20 overs)	v	Middlesex; 162/8 (20 overs)
Jack Leaning 64 (42); Chris Green 5/32 (4 overs)		Luke Hollman 51 (33); Darren Stevens 3/32 (4 overs)

Kent Spitfires won by 16 runs
St Lawrence Ground, Canterbury
Umpires: Alex Wharf and Peter Hartley
Player of the match: Jack Leaning (Kent)

- Middlesex won the toss and elected to field.
- Chris Green (Middx) took a hat-trick.
- Points: Kent Spitfires 2, Middlesex 0.

11 June 2021
19:00 (N)
Scorecard

Hampshire Hawks; 155/6 (20 overs)	v	Essex Eagles; 142 (19.2 overs)
Joe Weatherley 42 (34); Sam Cook 2/21 (4 overs)		Tom Westley 44 (29); Brad Wheal 2/35 (3.2 overs)

Hampshire Hawks won by 13 runs
County Cricket Ground, Chelmsford
Umpires: Graham Lloyd and Paul Pollard
Player of the match: Chris Wood (Hants)

- Essex Eagles won the toss and elected to field.
- Will Buttleman (Essex) made his T20 debut.
- Points: Hampshire Hawks 2, Essex Eagles 0.

12 June 2021
19:00 (N)
Scorecard

Hampshire Hawks; 154/7 (20 overs)	v	Sussex Sharks; 155/1 (16.2 overs)
James Vince 36 (26); Archie Lenham 3/14 (3 overs)		Phil Salt 72* (44); Ian Holland 1/14 (1 over)

Sussex Sharks won by 9 wickets
County Cricket Ground, Hove
Umpires: Peter Hartley and Alex Wharf
Player of the match: Archie Lenham (Sussex)

- Hampshire Hawks won the toss and elected to bat.
- Points: Sussex Sharks 2, Hampshire Hawks 0.

13 June 2021
14:30
Scorecard

Essex Eagles; 153/6 (20 overs)	v	Glamorgan; 156/3 (19 overs)
Will Buttleman 36 (26); Ruaidhri Smith 2/13 (3 overs)		Nick Selman 65 (45); Jack Plom 1/30 (3 overs)

Glamorgan won by 7 wickets
Sophia Gardens, Cardiff
Umpires: David Millns and Steve O'Shaughnessy
Player of the match: Nick Selman (Glam)

- Glamorgan won the toss and elected to field.
- Points: Glamorgan 2, Essex Eagles 0.

13 June 2021
18:30 (D/N)
Scorecard

Kent Spitfires; 183/5 (20 overs)	v	Gloucestershire; 178/8 (20 overs)
Jack Leaning 81* (51); David Payne 3/40 (4 overs)		Benny Howell 44 (23); Joe Denly 2/20 (3 overs)

Kent Spitfires won by 5 runs
St Lawrence Ground, Canterbury
Umpires: Graham Lloyd and Neil Bainton
Player of the match: Jack Leaning (Kent)

- Kent Spitfires won the toss and elected to bat.
- Points: Kent Spitfires 2, Gloucestershire 0.

14 June 2021
18:30 (D/N)
Scorecard

Glamorgan; 166/8 (20 overs)	v	Surrey; 167/5 (18.2 overs)
Marnus Labuschagne 74 (51); Dan Moriarty 3/26 (4 overs)		Jason Roy 64 (35); Marnus Labuschagne 2/31 (4 overs)

Surrey won by 5 wickets
The Oval, London
Umpires: Nick Cook and Peter Hartley
Player of the match: Jason Roy (Surrey)

- Surrey won the toss and elected to field.
- Points: Surrey 2, Glamorgan 0.

15 June 2021
17:30 (D/N)
Scorecard

Hampshire Hawks; 215/6 (20 overs)	v	Middlesex; 217/7 (19.4 overs)
D'Arcy Short 48 (28); Nathan Sowter 2/32 (4 overs)		Joe Cracknell 77 (43); Mason Crane 3/35 (3 overs)

Middlesex won by 3 wickets
Radlett Cricket Club, Radlett
Umpires: Nigel Llong and Paul Baldwin
Player of the match: Joe Cracknell (Middx)

- Middlesex won the toss and elected to field.
- Points: Middlesex 2, Hampshire Hawks 0.

15 June 2021
18:30 (D/N)
Scorecard

Somerset; 204/7 (20 overs)	v	Kent Spitfires; 157 (18 overs)
Tom Abell 68 (33); Grant Stewart 3/33 (4 overs)		Zak Crawley 48 (23); Marchant de Lange 3/18 (3 overs)

Somerset won by 47 runs
County Ground, Taunton
Umpires: Billy Taylor and Russell Warren
Player of the match: Tom Abell (Som)

- Kent Spitfires won the toss and elected to field.
- Points: Somerset 2, Kent Spitfires 0.

15 June 2021
19:00 (N)
Scorecard

Essex Eagles; 128/8 (20 overs)	v	Sussex Sharks; 130/3 (14 overs)
Michael Pepper 38 (25); George Garton 3/31 (4 overs)		Luke Wright 75 (44); Aron Nijjar 2/26 (3 overs)

Sussex Sharks won by 7 wickets
County Cricket Ground, Chelmsford
Umpires: Hassan Adnan and Peter Hartley
Player of the match: Luke Wright (Sussex)

- Sussex Sharks won the toss and elected to field.
- Points: Sussex Sharks 2, Essex Eagles 0.

16 June 2021
17:00 (D/N)
Scorecard

Kent Spitfires; 144/7 (20 overs)	v	Glamorgan; 104 (17.4 overs)
Jordan Cox 32* (24); Dan Douthwaite 2/17 (3 overs)		James Weighell 24 (20); Matt Milnes 5/22 (3.4 overs)

Kent Spitfires won by 40 runs
Sophia Gardens, Cardiff
Umpires: Ian Blackwell and Ian Ramage
Player of the match: Matt Milnes (Kent)

- Kent Spitfires won the toss and elected to bat.
- Points: Kent Spitfires 2, Glamorgan 0.

17 June 2021
17:30 (D/N)
Scorecard

Middlesex; 179/5 (20 overs)	v	Gloucestershire; 157/5 (18 overs)
Joe Cracknell 67 (41); Tom Smith 1/13 (2 overs)		Ian Cockbain 62* (39); Chris Green 2/30 (4 overs)

Gloucestershire won by 2 runs (DLS method)
Radlett Cricket Club, Radlett
Umpires: Martin Saggers and Peter Hartley
Player of the match: Ian Cockbain (Glos)

- Gloucestershire won the toss and elected to field.
- Gloucestershire were set a revised target of 156 runs from 18 overs due to rain.
- Points: Gloucestershire 2, Middlesex 0.

17 June 2021
18:30 (D/N)
Scorecard

Surrey; 53/2 (5 overs)	v	Sussex Sharks
Will Jacks 38* (18); David Wiese 1/4 (1 over)

No result
The Oval, London
Umpires: Ben Debenham and Russell Warren

- Sussex Sharks won the toss and elected to field.
- No further play was possible due to rain.
- Points: Surrey 1, Sussex Sharks 1.

18 June 2021
17:00 (D/N)
Scorecard

Glamorgan; 150/9 (20 overs)	v	Middlesex; 129/9 (20 overs)
Colin Ingram 75 (48); Steven Finn 4/19 (4 overs)		Paul Stirling 46 (36); Timm van der Gugten 3/16 (4 overs)

Glamorgan won by 21 runs
Sophia Gardens, Cardiff
Umpires: Mark Newell and Neil Bainton
Player of the match: Colin Ingram (Glam)

- Glamorgan won the toss and elected to bat.
- Tom Cullen (Glam) made his T20 debut.
- Points: Glamorgan 2, Middlesex 0.

18 June 2021
18:30 (D/N)
Scorecard

Surrey	v	Hampshire Hawks

Match abandoned
The Oval, London
Umpires: Peter Hartley and Paul Pollard

- No toss.
- No play was possible due to rain.
- Points: Surrey 1, Hampshire Hawks 1.

18 June 2021
19:00 (N)
Scorecard

Sussex Sharks	v	Somerset

Match abandoned
County Cricket Ground, Hove
Umpires: Ian Blackwell and Hassan Adnan

- No toss.
- No play was possible due to rain.
- Points: Sussex Sharks 1, Somerset 1.

18 June 2021
19:00 (N)
Scorecard

Essex Eagles	v	Gloucestershire

Match abandoned
County Cricket Ground, Chelmsford
Umpires: Ben Debenham and Billy Taylor

- No toss.
- No play was possible due to rain.
- Points: Essex Eagles 1, Gloucestershire 1.

19 June 2021
19:00 (N)
Scorecard

Somerset	v	Glamorgan

Match abandoned
County Ground, Taunton
Umpires: Nigel Llong and Steve O'Shaughnessy

- No toss.
- No play was possible due to rain.
- Points: Somerset 1, Glamorgan 1.

20 June 2021
14:30
Scorecard

Gloucestershire	v	Hampshire Hawks

Match abandoned
County Ground, Bristol
Umpires: Rob Bailey and Tim Robinson

- No toss.
- No play was possible due to rain.
- Points: Gloucestershire 1, Hampshire Hawks 1.

20 June 2021
14:30
Scorecard

Kent Spitfires; 236/3 (20 overs)	v	Essex Eagles; 169 (19.2 overs)
Daniel Bell-Drummond 88 (44); Paul Walter 1/21 (2 overs)		Adam Wheater 46 (29); Jack Leaning 3/15 (2 overs)

Kent Spitfires won by 67 runs
St Lawrence Ground, Canterbury
Umpires: Ben Debenham and Paul Pollard
Player of the match: Jack Leaning (Kent)

- Essex Eagles won the toss and elected to field.
- Points: Kent Spitfires 2, Essex Eagles 0.

21 June 2021
18:30 (D/N)
Scorecard

Surrey; 118 (16.4 overs)	v	Essex Eagles; 119/2 (15.3 overs)
Jordan Clark 30 (31); Sam Cook 4/15 (3.4 overs)		Will Buttleman 56* (51); Daniel Moriarty 1/27 (4 overs)

Essex Eagles won by 8 wickets (DLS method)
The Oval, London
Umpires: Billy Taylor and Nigel Llong
Player of the match: Sam Cook (Essex)

- Essex Eagles won the toss and elected to field.
- The match was reduced to 17 overs per side due to rain.
- Ben Geddes (Surrey) made his T20 debut.
- Points: Essex Eagles 2, Surrey 0.

22 June 2021
18:30 (D/N)
Scorecard

Kent Spitfires; 147/7 (20 overs)	v	Gloucestershire; 149/2 (13.4 overs)
Zak Crawley 43 (29); Tom Smith 2/17 (3 overs)		Glenn Phillips 41* (25); Matt Milnes 1/15 (2 overs)

Gloucestershire won by 8 wickets
County Ground, Bristol
Umpires: Nick Cook and Paul Baldwin
Player of the match: Glenn Phillips (Glos)

- Gloucestershire won the toss and elected to field.
- Points: Gloucestershire 2, Kent Spitfires 0.

22 June 2021
19:00 (N)
Scorecard

Sussex Sharks	v	Glamorgan

Match abandoned
County Cricket Ground, Hove

- No toss.
- No play was possible due to a wet outfield.
- Points: Sussex Sharks 1, Glamorgan 1.

23 June 2021
18:30 (D/N)
Scorecard

Surrey; 146/8 (20 overs)	v	Somerset; 149/3 (18.4 overs)
Will Jacks 65 (43); Jack Leach 3/28 (4 overs)		James Hildreth 72* (59); Gareth Batty 1/21 (3 overs)

Somerset won by 7 wickets
The Oval, London
Umpires: Neil Bainton and Rob Bailey
Player of the match: James Hildreth (Som)

- Somerset won the toss and elected to field.
- Jack Leach (Som) made his T20 debut.
- Points: Somerset 2, Surrey 0.

24 June 2021
18:15 (D/N)
Scorecard

Middlesex; 183/2 (20 overs)	v	Essex Eagles; 184/8 (20 overs)
Stephen Eskinazi 102* (61); James Neesham 1/7 (1 over)		Dan Lawrence 59 (37); Daryl Mitchell 3/24 (3 overs)

Essex Eagles won by 2 wickets
Lord's, London
Umpires: Ian Gould and Paul Baldwin
Player of the match: Dan Lawrence (Essex)

- Essex Eagles won the toss and elected to field.
- Stephen Eskinazi (Middlesex) scored his first century in a T20 match.
- Points: Essex Eagles 2, Middlesex 0.

24 June 2021
18:30 (D/N)
Scorecard

Gloucestershire; 216/2 (20 overs)	v	Glamorgan; 182/8 (20 overs)
Glenn Phillips 94* (41); Callum Taylor 1/21 (2 overs); Marnus Labuschagne 1/21 (2 overs)		David Lloyd 44 (22); Ryan Higgins 2/27 (3 overs)

Gloucestershire won by 34 runs
County Ground, Bristol
Umpires: James Middlebrook and Tim Robinson
Player of the match: Glenn Phillips (Glos)

- Glamorgan won the toss and elected to field.
- Points: Gloucestershire 2, Glamorgan 0.

25 June 2021
18:30 (D/N)
Scorecard

Middlesex; 174/7 (20 overs)	v	Surrey; 175/5 (19 overs)
Stevie Eskinazi 64 (51); Gus Atkinson 4/36 (4 overs)		Ollie Pope 52* (35); Luke Hollman 2/41 (4 overs)

Surrey won by 4 wickets
The Oval, London
Umpires: Ian Blackwell and Steve O'Shaughnessy
Player of the match: Ollie Pope (Surrey)

- Surrey won the toss and elected to field.
- Points: Surrey 2, Middlesex 0.

25 June 2021
18:30 (D/N)
Scorecard

Somerset; 172/9 (20 overs)	v	Hampshire Hawks; 165/8 (20 overs)
Tom Banton 77 (37); Scott Currie 4/31 (4 overs)		Colin de Grandhomme 66 (34); Lewis Gregory 3/46 (4 overs)

Somerset won by 7 runs
County Ground, Taunton
Umpires: Mark Newell and Tim Robinson
Player of the match: Tom Banton (Som)

- Hampshire Hawks won the toss and elected to field.
- Tom Prest (Hants) made his T20 debut.
- Points: Somerset 2, Hampshire Hawks 0.

25 June 2021
19:00 (N)
Scorecard

Gloucestershire; 162/5 (20 overs)	v	Sussex Sharks; 135 (19.5 overs)
Glenn Phillips 94* (58); Tymal Mills 3/20 (4 overs)		Luke Wright 33 (20); Benny Howell 4/15 (4 overs)

Gloucestershire won by 27 runs
County Cricket Ground, Hove
Umpires: Paul Baldwin and Tom Lungley
Player of the match: Glenn Phillips (Glos)

- Sussex Sharks won the toss and elected to field.
- Points: Gloucestershire 2, Sussex Sharks 0.

25 June 2021
19:00 (N)
Scorecard

Kent Spitfires; 167/9 (20 overs)	v	Essex Eagles; 31/4 (5 overs)
Daniel Bell-Drummond 50 (29); Simon Harmer 4/26 (4 overs)		Dan Lawrence 19* (13); Matt Milnes 2/15 (3 overs)

Kent Spitfires won by 28 runs (DLS method)
County Cricket Ground, Chelmsford
Umpires: Rob Bailey and Rob White
Player of the match: Daniel Bell-Drummond (Kent)

- Essex Eagles won the toss and elected to field.
- Essex Eagles were set a revised target of 60 runs from 5 overs.
- Points: Kent Spitfires 2, Essex Eagles 0.

27 June 2021
14:30
Scorecard

Glamorgan; 170/8 (20 overs)	v	Middlesex; 171/3 (17.4 overs)
Dan Douthwaite 53 (31); Daryl Mitchell 3/37 (4 overs)		Stephen Eskinazi 91* (56); Dan Douthwaite 2/27 (2.4 overs)

Middlesex won by 7 wickets
Radlett Cricket Club, Radlett
Umpires: Nick Cook and Tom Lungley
Player of the match: Stephen Eskinazi (Middx)

- Glamorgan won the toss and elected to bat.
- Points: Middlesex 2, Glamorgan 0.

27 June 2021
14:30
Scorecard

Surrey; 175/7 (20 overs)	v	Sussex Sharks; 43/1 (4.5 overs)
Jamie Smith 57 (43); Tymal Mills 3/21 (4 overs)		Phil Salt 20* (12); Jamie Overton 1/6 (1 over)

No result
County Cricket Ground, Hove
Umpires: Paul Baldwin and Tim Robinson

- Sussex Sharks won the toss and elected to field.
- Rains during Sussex Sharks' innings prevented any further play.
- Points: Surrey 1, Sussex Sharks 1.

28 June 2021
19:00 (N)
Scorecard

Hampshire Hawks	v	Middlesex

Match abandoned
Rose Bowl, Southampton
Umpires: Billy Taylor and Neil Mallender

- No toss.
- No play was possible due to rain.
- Points: Hampshire Hawks 1, Middlesex 1.

28 June 2021
19:00 (N)
Scorecard

Kent Spitfires; 168/8 (20 overs)	v	Somerset; 169/0 (15.4 overs)
Zak Crawley 39 (32); Lewis Gregory 4/27 (4 overs)		Tom Banton 107* (51)

Somerset won by 10 wickets
St Lawrence Ground, Canterbury
Umpires: Ben Debenham and Paul Pollard
Player of the match: Tom Banton (Som)

- Somerset won the toss and elected to field.
- Points: Somerset 2, Kent Spitfires 0.

29 June 2021
17:30 (D/N)
Scorecard

Glamorgan; 153/6 (20 overs)	v	Surrey; 152/9 (20 overs)
Billy Root 41* (28); Gus Atkinson 2/46 (4 overs)		Ollie Pope 60 (45); Prem Sisodiya 2/22 (4 overs)

Glamorgan won by 1 run
Sophia Gardens, Cardiff
Umpires: Hassan Adnan and Paul Baldwin
Player of the match: Billy Root (Glam)

- Surrey won the toss and elected to field.
- Sam Pearce (Glam) made his T20 debut.
- Points: Glamorgan 2, Surrey 0.

29 June 2021
19:00 (N)
Scorecard

Sussex Sharks	v	Kent Spitfires

Match abandoned
County Cricket Ground, Hove
Umpires: Neil Mallender and Neil Pratt

- No toss.
- No play was possible due to rain.
- Points: Sussex Sharks 1, Kent Spitfires 1.

29 June 2021
19:00 (N)
Scorecard

Somerset; 153 (20 overs)	v	Essex Eagles; 151/4 (18.1 overs)
Devon Conway 53 (47); Simon Harmer 4/24 (4 overs)		Michael Pepper 55* (35); Craig Overton 1/14 (3 overs)

Essex Eagles won by 6 wickets (DLS method)
County Cricket Ground, Chelmsford
Umpires: James Middlebrook and Nick Cook
Player of the match: Michael Pepper (Essex)

- Essex Eagles won the toss and elected to field.
- Essex Eagles were set a revised target of 148 runs from 19 overs due to rain.
- Points: Essex Eagles 2, Somerset 0.

30 June 2021
19:00 (N)
Scorecard

Surrey; 146/7 (20 overs)	v	Hampshire Hawks; 126/8 (20 overs)
Jamie Smith 59 (41); Scott Currie 3/21 (3 overs)		Tom Prest 20 (24); Gus Atkinson 3/21 (4 overs)

Surrey won by 20 runs
Rose Bowl, Southampton
Umpires: Ian Gould and Neil Pratt
Player of the match: Jamie Smith (Surrey)

- Hampshire Hawks won the toss and elected to field.
- Points: Surrey 2, Hampshire Hawks 0.

==== July ====
1 July 2021
18:15 (D/N)
Scorecard

Middlesex; 166/7 (20 overs)	v	Sussex Sharks; 103/9 (20 overs)
Stephen Eskinazi 59 (35); Tymal Mills 2/31 (4 overs)		Travis Head 23 (25); Nathan Sowter 3/13 (4 overs)

Middlesex won by 63 runs
Lord's, London
Umpires: James Middlebrook and Neil Bainton
Player of the match: Stephen Eskinazi (Middx)

- Sussex Sharks won the toss and elected to field.
- Harrison Ward (Sussex) made his T20 debut.
- Points: Middlesex 2, Sussex Sharks 0.

1 July 2021
18:30 (D/N)
Scorecard

Gloucestershire; 161/7 (20 overs)	v	Somerset; 165/2 (19.2 overs)
Benny Howell 52 (41); Lewis Gregory 5/24 (4 overs)		Devon Conway 81* (65); Tom Smith 1/25 (4 overs)

Somerset won by 8 wickets
County Ground, Bristol
Umpires: Ian Ramage and Paul Pollard
Player of the match: Lewis Gregory (Som)

- Somerset won the toss and elected to field.
- Points: Somerset 2, Gloucestershire 0.

1 July 2021
19:00 (N)
Scorecard

Glamorgan; 104 (17 overs)	v	Essex Eagles; 108/2 (12.2 overs)
Chris Cooke 25 (22); Jack Plom 2/16 (3 overs)		Dan Lawrence 55* (31); Roman Walker 1/8 (2 overs)

Essex Eagles won by 8 wickets
County Cricket Ground, Chelmsford
Umpires: Mark Newell and Neil Mallender
Player of the match: Dan Lawrence (Essex)

- Glamorgan won the toss and elected to bat.
- Points: Essex Eagles 2, Glamorgan 0.

2 July 2021
17:30 (D/N)
Scorecard

Sussex Sharks; 201/8 (20 overs)	v	Glamorgan; 168 (18.4 overs)
Luke Wright 77 (41); Dan Douthwaite 3/28 (4 overs)		David Lloyd 51 (29); Archie Lenham 4/26 (4 overs)

Sussex Sharks won by 33 runs
Sophia Gardens, Cardiff
Umpires: Ian Ramage and Paul Pollard
Player of the match: Archie Lenham (Sussex)

- Sussex Sharks won the toss and elected to bat.
- Points: Sussex Sharks 2, Glamorgan 0.

2 July 2021
18:30 (D/N)
Scorecard

Somerset; 152 (18.1 overs)	v	Middlesex; 114/6 (16 overs)
Devon Conway 45 (26); Blake Cullen 4/32 (4 overs)		Nathan Sowter 37* (24); Craig Overton 3/28 (4 overs)

Somerset won by 5 runs (DLS method)
County Ground, Taunton
Umpires: Ian Gould and Neil Pratt
Player of the match: Blake Cullen (Som)

- Middlesex won the toss and elected to field.
- Middlesex were set a revised target of 120 runs from 16 overs due to rain.
- Points: Somerset 2, Middlesex 0.

2 July 2021
19:00 (N)
Scorecard

Hampshire Hawks; 176/6 (20 overs)	v	Gloucestershire; 166/5 (20 overs)
Tom Prest 59* (42); Josh Shaw 2/29 (4 overs)		Glenn Phillips 57 (38); Chris Wood 2/31 (4 overs)

Hampshire Hawks won by 10 runs
Rose Bowl, Southampton
Umpires: Neil Bainton and Chris Watts
Player of the match: Tom Prest (Hants)

- Hampshire Hawks won the toss and elected to bat.
- Points: Hampshire Hawks 2, Gloucestershire 0.

2 July 2021
19:00 (N)
Scorecard

Kent Spitfires; 191/4 (20 overs)	v	Surrey; 180/6 (20 overs)
Jordan Cox 61* (28); Will Jacks 1/12 (2 overs)		Will Jacks 87 (54); Adam Milne 4/38 (4 overs)

Kent Spitfires won by 11 runs
St Lawrence Ground, Canterbury
Umpires: Mark Newell and Neil Mallender
Player of the match: Will Jacks (Surrey)

- Kent Spitfires won the toss and elected to bat.
- Points: Kent Spitfires 2, Surrey 0.

9 July 2021
14:30
Scorecard

Gloucestershire; 171/8 (20 overs)	v	Middlesex; 161/8 (20 overs)
Ryan Higgins 43 (25); Luke Hollman 2/10 (2 overs)		Max Holden 50* (34); Benny Howell 3/23 (4 overs)

Gloucestershire won by 10 runs
College Ground, Cheltenham
Umpires: Ben Debenham and Russell Warren
Player of the match: Ryan Higgins (Glos)

- Middlesex won the toss and elected to field.
- Josh de Caires (Middx) made his T20 debut.
- Points: Gloucestershire 2, Middlesex 0.

9 July 2021
18:30 (D/N)
Scorecard

Surrey; 128/7 (20 overs)	v	Kent Spitfires; 129/1 (15.3 overs)
Jordan Clark 36* (29); Adam Milne 2/13 (4 overs)		Daniel Bell-Drummond 53* (47); Dan Moriarty 1/26 (4 overs)

Kent Spitfires won by 9 wickets
The Oval, London
Umpires: Ian Gould and Tom Lungley
Player of the match: Daniel Bell-Drummond (Kent)

- Kent Spitfires won the toss and elected to field.
- Points: Kent Spitfires 2, Surrey 0.

9 July 2021
19:00 (N)
Scorecard

Hampshire Hawks; 175/6 (20 overs)	v	Somerset; 100 (16 overs)
Lewis McManus 60* (36); Marchant de Lange 2/33 (4 overs); Jack Brooks 2/33 (4 overs)		Roelof van der Merwe 25 (18); Scott Currie 4/24 (3 overs)

Hampshire Hawks won by 75 runs
Rose Bowl, Southampton
Umpires: Neil Mallender and Rob White
Player of the match: Joe Weatherley (Hants)

- Hampshire Hawks won the toss and elected to bat.
- Toby Albert (Hants) made his T20 debut.
- Points: Hampshire Hawks 2, Somerset 0.

9 July 2021
19:00 (N)
Scorecard

Essex Eagles; 146/9 (20 overs)	v	Sussex Sharks; 148/4 (18.3 overs)
Tom Westley 53 (45); Chris Jordan 3/30 (4 overs)		Ravi Bopara 62* (46); Aron Nijjar 2/19 (3.3 overs)

Sussex Sharks won by 6 wickets
County Cricket Ground, Hove
Umpires: Nick Cook and Rob Bailey
Player of the match: Ravi Bopara (Sussex)

- Sussex Sharks won the toss and elected to field.
- Oli Carter (Sussex) made his T20 debut.
- Points: Sussex Sharks 2, Essex Eagles 0.

16 July 2021
14:00
Scorecard

Hampshire Hawks; 171/8 (20 overs)	v	Essex Eagles; 153 (19.2 overs)
James Vince 63 (46); Sam Cook 3/34 (4 overs)		Dan Lawrence 60 (45); Brad Wheal 2/21 (2.2 overs)

Hampshire Hawks won by 18 runs
Rose Bowl, Southampton
Umpires: Ian Gould and Neil Bainton
Player of the match: James Vince (Hants)

- Hampshire Hawks won the toss and elected to bat.
- Points: Hampshire Hawks 2, Essex Eagles 0.

16 July 2021
14:30
Scorecard

Gloucestershire; 177/9 (20 overs)	v	Surrey; 178/3 (18.2 overs)
Glenn Phillips 48 (26); Gus Atkinson 4/37 (4 overs)		Jamie Smith 60 (47); Benny Howell 1/26 (4 overs)

Surrey won by 7 wickets
College Ground, Cheltenham
Umpires: Richard Illingworth and Tom Lungley
Player of the match: Gareth Batty (Surrey)

- Surrey won the toss and elected to field.
- Points: Surrey 2, Gloucestershire 0.

16 July 2021
18:15 (D/N)
Scorecard

Kent Spitfires; 157/8 (20 overs)	v	Middlesex; 80 (16.3 overs)
Harry Finch 47 (35); Blake Cullen 4/33 (4 overs)		Mujeeb Ur Rahman 13 (9); Elliot Hooper 3/24 (4 overs)

Kent Spitfires won by 77 runs
Lord's, London
Umpires: Ben Debenham and Nigel Llong
Player of the match: Elliot Hooper (Kent)

- Kent Spitfires won the toss and elected to bat.
- Elliot Hooper (Kent) made his T20 debut.
- Points: Kent Spitfires 2, Middlesex 0.

16 July 2021
18:30 (D/N)
Scorecard

Somerset; 181/5 (20 overs)	v	Glamorgan; 107 (17.4 overs)
Devon Conway 70* (52); Roman Walker 3/15 (4 overs)		Dan Douthwaite 25 (16); Lewis Goldsworthy 3/14 (4 overs)

Somerset won by 74 runs
Sophia Gardens, Cardiff
Umpires: Graham Lloyd and Peter Hartley
Player of the match: Devon Conway (Som)

- Somerset won the toss and elected to bat.
- Points: Somerset 2, Glamorgan 0.

16 July 2021
19:00 (N)
Scorecard

Sussex Sharks; 183/6 (20 overs)	v	Hampshire Hawks; 184/4 (19.2 overs)
Ravi Bopara 62 (42); Liam Dawson 2/15 (4 overs)		James Vince 102 (59); Will Beer 2/20 (3 overs)

Hampshire Hawks won by 6 wickets
Rose Bowl, Southampton
Umpires: Ian Gould and Neil Bainton
Player of the match: James Vince (Hants)

- Sussex Sharks won the toss and elected to bat.
- Points: Hampshire Hawks 2, Sussex Sharks 0.

18 July 2021
14:30
Scorecard

Glamorgan; 184/4 (20 overs)	v	Hampshire Hawks; 187/4 (13 overs)
Marnus Labuschagne 78 (47); Brad Wheal 3/39 (4 overs)		D'Arcy Short 69 (30); Andrew Salter 2/31 (3 overs)

Hampshire Hawks won by 6 wickets
Rose Bowl, Southampton
Umpires: Ben Debenham and Neil Pratt
Player of the match: D'Arcy Short (Hants)

- Hampshire Hawks won the toss and elected to field.
- Points: Hampshire Hawks 2, Glamorgan 0.

18 July 2021
14:30
Scorecard

Middlesex; 169/5 (20 overs)	v	Essex Eagles; 160/9 (20 overs)
Sam Robson 60 (44); Sam Cook 2/41 (4 overs)		Tom Westley 37 (27); Steven Finn 3/25 (3 overs)

Middlesex won by 9 runs
County Cricket Ground, Chelmsford
Umpires: Graham Lloyd and Ian Gould
Player of the match: Sam Robson (Middx)

- Middlesex won the toss and elected to bat.
- Josh Rymell (Essex) made his T20 debut.
- Points: Middlesex 2, Essex Eagles 0.

18 July 2021
18:30 (D/N)
Scorecard

Kent Spitfires; 130/7 (20 overs)	v	Sussex Sharks; 134/6 (17.1 overs)
Calum MacLeod 31 (27); Ravi Bopara 3/15 (4 overs)		Luke Wright 39 (29); Harry Podmore 3/35 (4 overs)

Sussex Sharks won by 4 wickets
St Lawrence Ground, Canterbury
Umpires: Neil Bainton and Russell Warren
Player of the match: Ravi Bopara (Kent)

- Kent Spitfires won the toss and elected to bat.
- Points: Sussex Sharks 2, Kent Spitfires 0.

18 July 2021
18:30 (D/N)
Scorecard

Somerset; 183/7 (20 overs)	v	Gloucestershire; 160/6 (20 overs)
Tom Lammonby 90 (36); David Payne 2/35 (4 overs)		Ian Cockbain 72 (46); Ben Green 2/34 (4 overs)

Somerset won by 23 runs
County Ground, Taunton
Umpires: Nigel Llong and Rob Bailey
Player of the match: Tom Lammonby (Som)

- Gloucestershire won the toss and elected to field.
- Points: Somerset 2, Gloucestershire 0.

== Knock-out stage ==
Quarter-finals
N1	Notts Outlaws	123
S4	Hampshire Hawks	125/9
S2	Somerset	185/3
N3	Lancashire Lightning	184/9
N2	Yorkshire Vikings	177/7
S3	Sussex Sharks	178/5
S1	Kent Spitfires	162/7
N4	Birmingham Bears	141

Semi-finals
QF1	Hampshire Hawks	150
QF2	Somerset	153/8
QF3	Sussex Sharks	147
QF4	Kent Spitfires	168/8

Final
SF1	Somerset	142/9
SF2	Kent Spitfires	167/7

=== Quarter-finals ===
Quarter-final 1
24 August 2021
18:30 (D/N)
Scorecard

Yorkshire Vikings; 177/7 (20 overs)	v	Sussex Sharks; 178/5 (19.4 overs)
Gary Ballance 55 (37); Tymal Mills 3/39 (4 overs)		Luke Wright 54 (39); Jordan Thompson 3/28 (4 overs)

Sussex Sharks won by 5 wickets
Riverside Ground, Chester-le-Street
Umpires: Peter Hartley and Nigel Llong
Player of the match: Rashid Khan (Sussex)

- Yorkshire Vikings won the toss and elected to bat.
- Yorkshire played their home match at the Riverside Ground because Headingley was used for England's third Test against India the following day.

Quarter-final 2
25 August 2021
19:00 (N)
Scorecard

Hampshire Hawks; 125/9 (20 overs)	v	Notts Outlaws; 123 (19.4 overs)
Tom Prest 44 (34); Dane Paterson 3/22 (4 overs)		Joe Clarke 42 (37); Liam Dawson 3/27 (4 overs)

Hampshire Hawks won by 2 runs
Trent Bridge, Nottingham
Umpires: Neil Mallender and Rob Bailey
Player of the match: Liam Dawson (Hants)

- Notts Outlaws won the toss and elected to field.

Quarter-final 3
26 August 2021
19:00 (N)
Scorecard

Lancashire Lightning; 184/9 (20 overs)	v	Somerset; 185/3 (18.2 overs)
Dane Vilas 42 (33); Roelof van der Merwe 4/27 (4 overs)		Tom Abell 78* (45); Danny Lamb 2/24 (3 overs)

Somerset won by 7 wickets
County Ground, Taunton
Umpires: Graham Lloyd and David Millns
Player of the match: Tom Abell (Som)

- Somerset won the toss and elected to field.

Quarter-final 4
27 August 2021
19:00 (N)
Scorecard

Kent Spitfires; 162/7 (20 overs)	v	Birmingham Bears; 141 (20 overs)
Sam Billings 56 (37); Tim Bresnan 4/26 (4 overs)		Jake Lintott 41 (20); Matt Milnes 4/24 (4 overs)

Kent Spitfires won by 21 runs
St Lawrence Ground, Canterbury
Umpires: Mike Burns and Russell Warren
Player of the match: Sam Billings (Kent)

- Birmingham Bears won the toss and elected to field.

== Finals Day ==
=== Semi-finals ===
Semi-final 1
18 September 2021
11:00
Scorecard

Hampshire Hawks; 150 (20 overs)	v	Somerset; 153/8 (19.4 overs)
Joe Weatherley 71 (50); Josh Davey 4/34 (4 overs)		Tom Abell 50 (35); Chris Wood 2/26 (4 overs)

Somerset won by 2 wickets
Edgbaston, Birmingham
Umpires: Mike Burns and Graham Lloyd
Player of the match: Josh Davey (Som)

- Somerset won the toss and elected to field.

Semi-final 2
18 September 2021
14:30
Scorecard

Kent Spitfires; 168/8 (20 overs)	v	Sussex Sharks; 147 (19.1 overs)
Daniel Bell-Drummond 82 (51); Tymal Mills 3/33 (4 overs)		George Garton 41 (23); Fred Klaassen 4/17 (3.1 overs)

Kent Spitfires won by 21 runs
Edgbaston, Birmingham
Umpires: Graham Lloyd and Martin Saggers
Player of the match: Daniel Bell-Drummond (Kent)

- Kent Spitfires won the toss and elected to bat.

=== Final ===
18 September 2021
18:45 (D/N)
Scorecard

Kent Spitfires; 167/7 (20 overs)	v	Somerset; 142/9 (20 overs)
Jordan Cox 58* (28); Roelof van der Merwe 3/19 (4 overs)		Will Smeed 43 (32); Joe Denly 3/31 (4 overs)

Kent Spitfires won by 25 runs
Edgbaston, Birmingham
Umpires: Mike Burns and Martin Saggers
Player of the match: Jordan Cox (Kent)

- Somerset won the toss and elected to field.
