= List of Northamptonshire Twenty20 cricket records =

This is a list of Northamptonshire's Twenty20 cricket records; that is, record team and individual performances in Twenty20 cricket for Northamptonshire County Cricket Club.

Most Twenty20 runs for Northamptonshire

Qualification - 1400 runs

Player	Runs
Alex Wakely	2597
David Willey	2462
Josh Cobb	2449
Richard Levi	2403
Ricardo Vasconcelos	1890
Ben Duckett	1587

Most Twenty20 wickets for Northamptonshire

Qualification - 50 wickets

Player	Wickets
Ben Sanderson	143
David Willey	139
Graeme White	91
Azharullah	70
Andrew Hall	64
Rory Kleinveldt	52

Team totals

Record	Score	Opposition	Venue	Year	Link
Highest Total For	240-6	Warwickshire	Birmingham	2025	
Highest Total Against	260-4	Yorkshire	Leeds	2017	
Lowest Total For	47	Durham	Chester-le-Street	2011	
Lowest Total Against	86	Worcestershire	Worcester	2006	

Batting

	Player	Information
Highest score	1. Chris Lynn; 2. Chris Lynn; 3. Chris Lynn	117 v Glamorgan at Sophia Gardens, Cardiff in 2026; 115* v Warwickshire at Edgbaston, Birmingham in 2026; 113* v Worcestershire at County Ground, Northampton in 2022
Most runs in season	1. Chris Lynn; 2. Chris Lynn; 3. Richard Levi	518 in 2026; 516 in 2022; 485 in 2015

Record partnership for each wicket

Wicket	Score	Batting partners	Opposition	Venue	Year	Link
1st	149	CA Lynn & BJ Curran	Durham	Northampton	2022	
2nd	129	RE Levi & JJ Cobb	Warwickshire	Birmingham	2018	
3rd	114	SA Zaib & CA Lynn	Leicestershire	Leicester	2023	
4th	123	BM Duckett & AG Wakely	Nottinghamshire	Birmingham	2016	
5th	110*	RA White & N Boje	Gloucestershire	Milton Keynes	2008	
6th	82*	DJG Sales & DG Wright	Gloucestershire	Milton Keynes	2005	
7th	70	LA Procter & J Broad	Hampshire	Birmingham	2025	
8th	62	SP Crook & RK Kleinveldt	Worcestershire	Worcester	2015	
9th	59*	DJ Willey & JA Brooks	Warwickshire	Birmingham	2011	
10th	40*	RA Weatherall & FJ Heldreich	Warwickshire	Birmingham	2024	

Bowling

	Player	Information
Best bowling (innings)	1. Ben Sanderson; 2. Andrew Hall; 3. Calvin Harrison	6-8 v Worcestershire at New Road, Worcester in 2025; 6-21 v Worcestershire at County Ground, Northampton in 2008; 5-9 v Essex at County Ground, Northampton in 2026
Most wickets in season	1. Azharullah; 2. Ben Sanderson; 3. George Scrimshaw	27 in 2013; 25 in 2025; 25 in 2025

Wicket-keeping

	Player	Information
Most victims in innings	1. Lewis McManus; 2. Lewis McManus	5 v Leicestershire at Grace Road, Leicester in 2023; 4 v Warwickshire at Edgbaston, Birmingham in 2025
Most victims in season	1. Lewis McManus; 2. Lewis McManus	20 in 2025; 17 in 2024
