= Tōnatiuh (disambiguation) =

Tōnatiuh or Tonatiuh is an Aztec sun deity of the daytime sky.

Tōnatiuh or Tonatiuh may also refer to:

== People ==
- Pedro de Alvarado (c. 1485 – 4 July 1541), a Spanish conquistador and colonial governor called Tōnatiuh by the Aztecs
- Tonatiuh (actor) – American actor, professionally known as Tonatiuh
- Tonatiuh Guillén López – Mexican academic and government official
- Tonatiuh Gutiérrez – Mexican swimmer (1929–2000)
- Duncan Tonatiuh – Mexican-American author and illustrator (born 1984)

== Other ==
- DGRCN Tonatiuh MX-1 – High-wing monoplane utility
- HD 104985 – Star in the constellation of Camelopardalis, also named Tonatiuh
