= Guillén =

Guillén is a surname. Notable people with the surname include:

- Amparo Guillén (1953–2024), Ecuadorian actress
- Carlos Guillén, Venezuelan baseball player
- Fernando Guillén (disambiguation), multiple people
- Harvey Guillén (born 1990), actor
- Joel Guillén (born 2001), Andorran footballer
- Jorge Guillén, Spanish poet
- José Guillén (born 1976), Dominican baseball player
- Montserrat Guillén (born 1964), Spanish statistician and economist
- Nancy Guillén (born 1976), Salvadoran hammer thrower
- Néstor Guillén Olmos (1890–1966), President of Bolivia for 27 days
- Nicolás Guillén, Afro-Cuban poet
- Ozzie Guillén (born 1964), Venezuelan baseball player and coach
- Osiel Cárdenas Guillén (born 1967), Mexican drug lord
- Rafael Guillén known as Subcomandante Marcos, spokesman for the Zapatista Army of National Liberation
- Ricardo Guillén (born 1967), Spanish basketball player
- Tonatiuh Guillén López, Mexican academic and government official
- Walter Guillén Soto, Catholic bishop in Honduras

== See also ==
- Murder of Vanessa Guillén
- Guillen
