= Fabrica de Aviones Anahuac =

Mexican aircraft manufacturer

Fabrica de Aviones Anahuac was an aircraft manufacturer founded in Mexico in 1966 to develop and produce an agricultural aircraft, the Tauro.

== Aircraft ==
- Anahuac Tauro
