= Justin Guillen =

Trinidadiad cricketer (born 1986)

Personal information
- Full name: Justin Christopher Guillen
- Born: 2 January 1986 (age 40); Trinidad
- Batting: Left-handed
- Bowling: Right-arm offbreak
- Relatives: Victor Guillen (Great-grandfather); Noel Guillen (Grandfather); Sammy Guillen (Great-uncle); Logan van Beek (Cousin)

Domestic team information
- Years: Team
- 2013: Trinidad and Tobago Red Steel
- 2008-present: Trinidad and Tobago
- Source: ESPNCricinfo, May 11, 2016

Justin Christopher Guillen (born January 2, 1986) is a Trinidadian cricketer who plays for the Trinidad and Tobago national cricket team. He made his debut for the side in the 2008 Stanford Super Series, and has since played over fifteen first-class matches. In May 2010, he was selected to play for the West Indies A.
