= Sammy Guillen =

New Zealand cricketer (1924–2013)

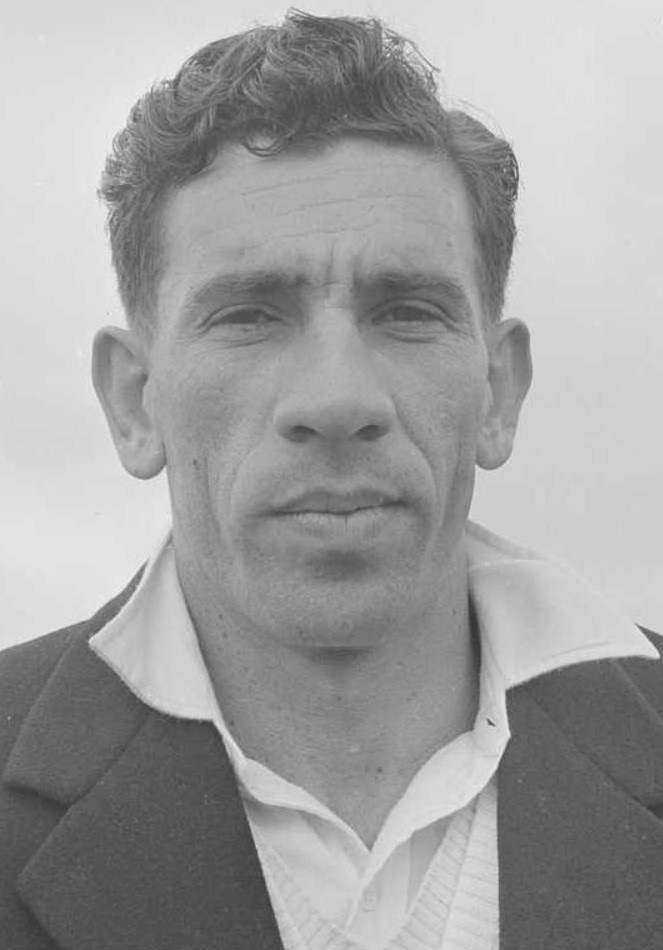
- Guillen in 1956

Personal information
- Full name: Simpson Clairmonte Guillen
- Born: 24 September 1924; Port-of-Spain, Trinidad
- Died: 1 March 2013 (aged 88); Christchurch, New Zealand
- Batting: Right-handed
- Role: Wicket-keeper-batsman
- Relatives: Victor Guillen (father); Noel Guillen (brother); Justin Guillen (grandson); Logan van Beek (grandson)

International information
- National sides: West Indies (1951–1952); New Zealand (1956)
- Test debut (cap 73/78): 22 December 1951; West Indies v Australia
- Last Test: 9 March 1956; New Zealand v West Indies

Domestic team information
- Years: Team
- 1947/48–1950/51: Trinidad
- 1952/53–1960/61: Canterbury

Career statistics
Competition	Test	First-class
Matches	8	66
Runs scored	202	2,672
Batting average	20.19	26.98
100s/50s	0/1	3/14
Top score	54	197
Balls bowled	–	120
Wickets	–	1
Bowling average	–	49.00
5 wickets in innings	–	0
10 wickets in match	–	0
Best bowling	–	1/1
Catches/stumpings	13/3	111/34
- Source: CricketArchive, 23 July 2016

Simpson Clairmonte "Sammy" Guillen (24 September 1924 – 1 March 2013) was one of the few men to have played Test cricket for two countries. Guillen, a right-handed batter and wicketkeeper, played five Test matches for the West Indies and three for New Zealand in the 1950s, including the New Zealand team's first victory - over the West Indies. He sealed the win by stumping Alf Valentine in his final Test.

== Life ==
Born 24 September 1924 at Port of Spain, Trinidad and Tobago, Guillen came from a family of cricketers who include: Victor Guillen (Simpson's father, a Test umpire in the West Indies), Noel Guillen (Simpson's brother, whom the Queen's Park Oval's outdoor practice nets are named after), Jeffrey Guillen (a well-known real estate mogul who played cricket competitively throughout his teens and well into his 30s; Noel's son), Charles Guillen (a former player who played a major factor in the coaching of West Indies all-rounder Dwayne Bravo) and Justin Guillen, an all-rounder for Trinidad and Tobago. His grandson Logan van Beek plays for the Canterbury Wizards in cricket and for the Christchurch Cougars in the NBL. Internationally, he represents the Netherlands in cricket.

Simpson resided in Christchurch with his wife Val Guillen, a former wicketkeeper for the province of Canterbury women's team. In 2004 he published his memoirs, Calypso Kiwi.

On the death of Colin Snedden on 24 April 2011, Guillen became the oldest surviving New Zealand Test cricketer; he was also the second-oldest surviving West Indian Test cricketer. He died at Christchurch on 1 March 2013.

== Soccer career ==
Guillen played in the final of New Zealand's premier association football competition, the Chatham Cup, gaining a runners-up medal for Western AFC in 1954. His position in the Western team was goalkeeper.

== See also ==
- List of cricketers who have played for more than one international team
