= Victor Guillen =

Trinidadian cricket umpire (1892–1968)

Personal information
- Born: 1892; Trinidad
- Died: 23 July 1968 (aged 75–76); Trinidad
- Relatives: Sammy Guillen (son); Noel Guillen (son); Justin Guillen (great grandson); Logan van Beek (great grandson)

Umpiring information
- Tests umpired: 2 (1935–1948)
- Source: Cricinfo, 6 July 2013

Victor Guillen (1892 – 23 July 1968) was a Trinidadian cricket umpire. He stood in two Test matches between 1935 and 1948. He also played in one first-class match for Trinidad and Tobago in 1921/22.

== See also ==
- List of Test cricket umpires
