= Blake Cullen =

English cricketer (born 2002)

Personal information
- Full name: Blake Carlton Cullen
- Born: 19 February 2002 (age 24); Isleworth, London, England
- Batting: Right-handed
- Bowling: Right-arm medium-fast
- Role: Bowler

Domestic team information
- Years: Team
- 2020–present: Middlesex (squad no. 19)
- 2021: London Spirit
- FC debut: 22 August 2020 Middlesex v Sussex
- LA debut: 1 August 2023 Middlesex v Hampshire

Career statistics
Competition	FC	LA	T20
Matches	10	4	41
Runs scored	225	15	96
Batting average	17.30	15.00	9.60
100s/50s	0/0	0/0	0/0
Top score	42	8	20*
Balls bowled	1,489	133	782
Wickets	22	2	53
Bowling average	44.27	85.00	23.13
5 wickets in innings	0	0	0
10 wickets in match	0	0	0
Best bowling	4/60	2/32	4/32
Catches/stumpings	4/–	0/–	8/–
- Source: ESPNcricinfo, 25 May 2025

Blake Carlton Cullen (born 19 February 2002) is an English cricketer. He made his first-class debut on 22 August 2020, for Middlesex against Sussex, in the 2020 Bob Willis Trophy. Prior to his first-class debut, he was named in England's squad for the 2020 Under-19 Cricket World Cup. Cullen made his Twenty20 debut on 10 June 2021, for Middlesex in the 2021 T20 Blast.

In July 2021, he was selected as a wildcard by the London Spirit for the 2021 season of The Hundred. He was retained for the 2022 season but was forced to withdraw due to injury.
