= Bárcenas B-01 =

Low-wing monoplane agricultural

Bárcenas B-01 ASA Chac
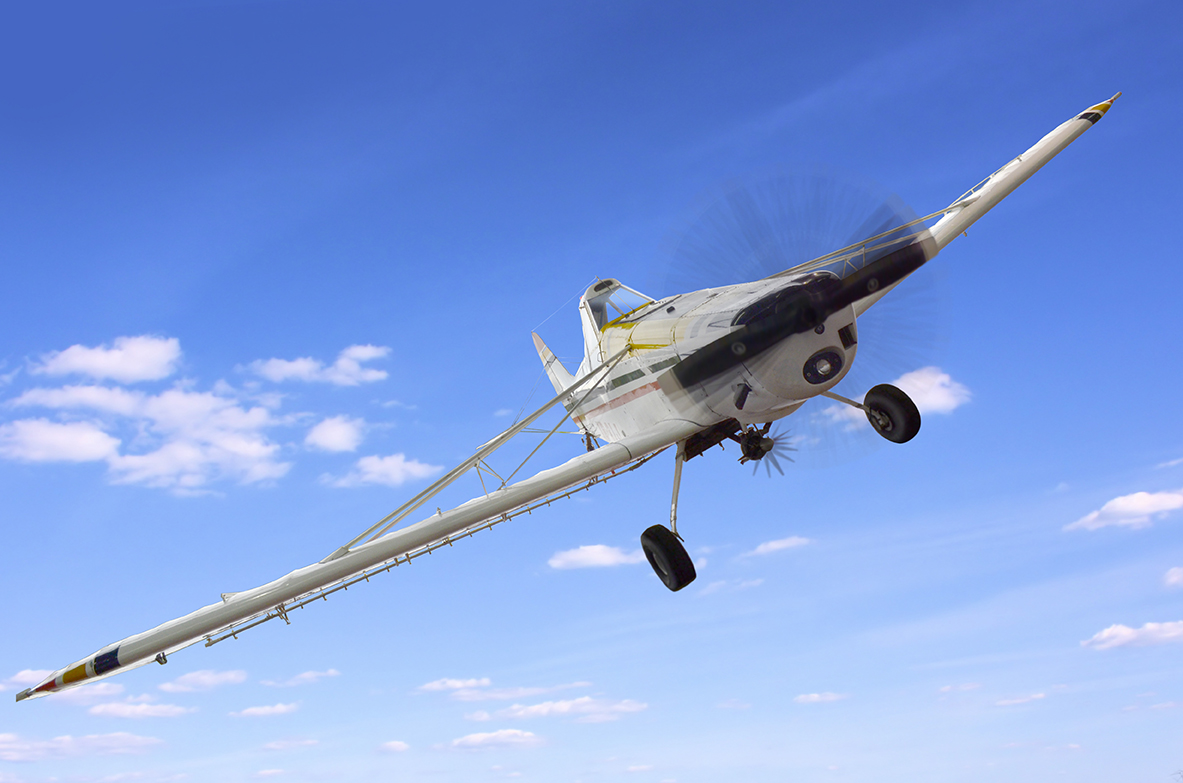

General information
- Type: Agricultural aircraft
- National origin: Mexico
- Manufacturer: Aeroservicio Bárcenas S.A.
- Designer: David Bárcenas Beutelspacher; César Trujillo Carrillo
- Status: Active
- Number built: 16 B-01; 10 Chac

History
- Manufactured: 1973-1982 (B-01); 1982-1983 (Chac)
- First flight: June 8, 1973
- Variants: ASA Chac; Tonatiuh MX-1

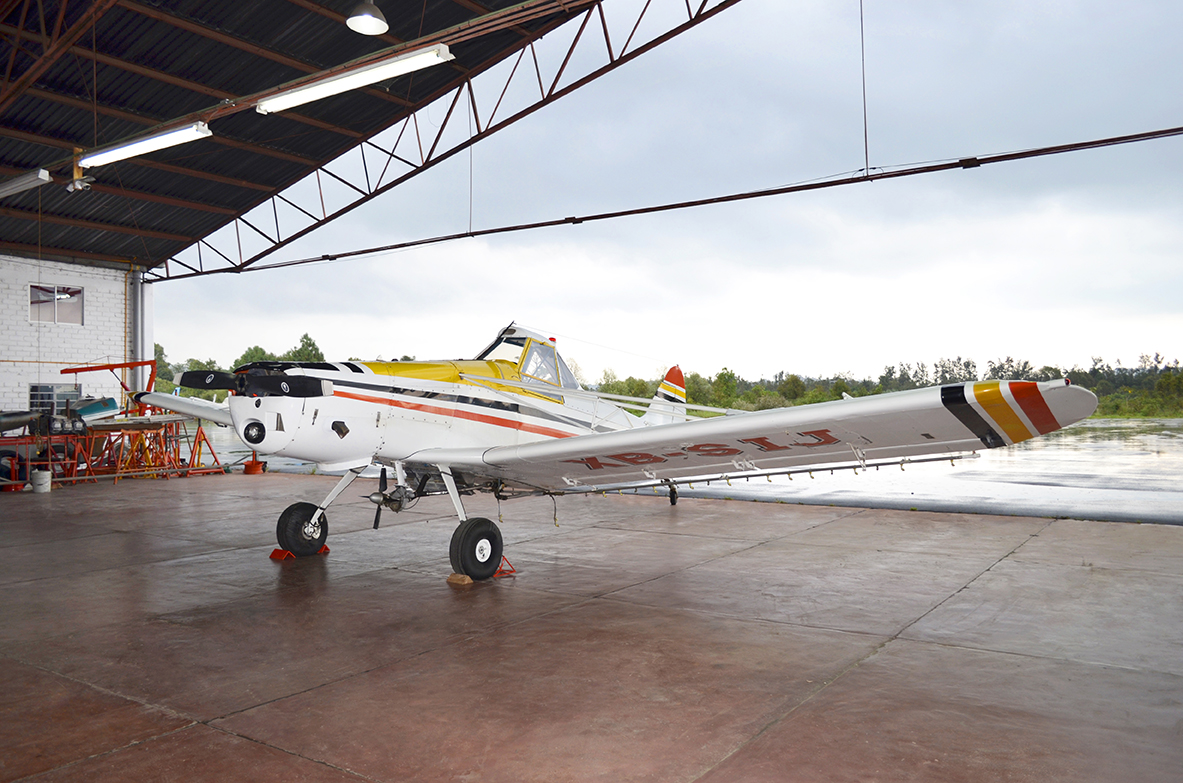
Bárcenas B-01 at Los Mochis International Airport.

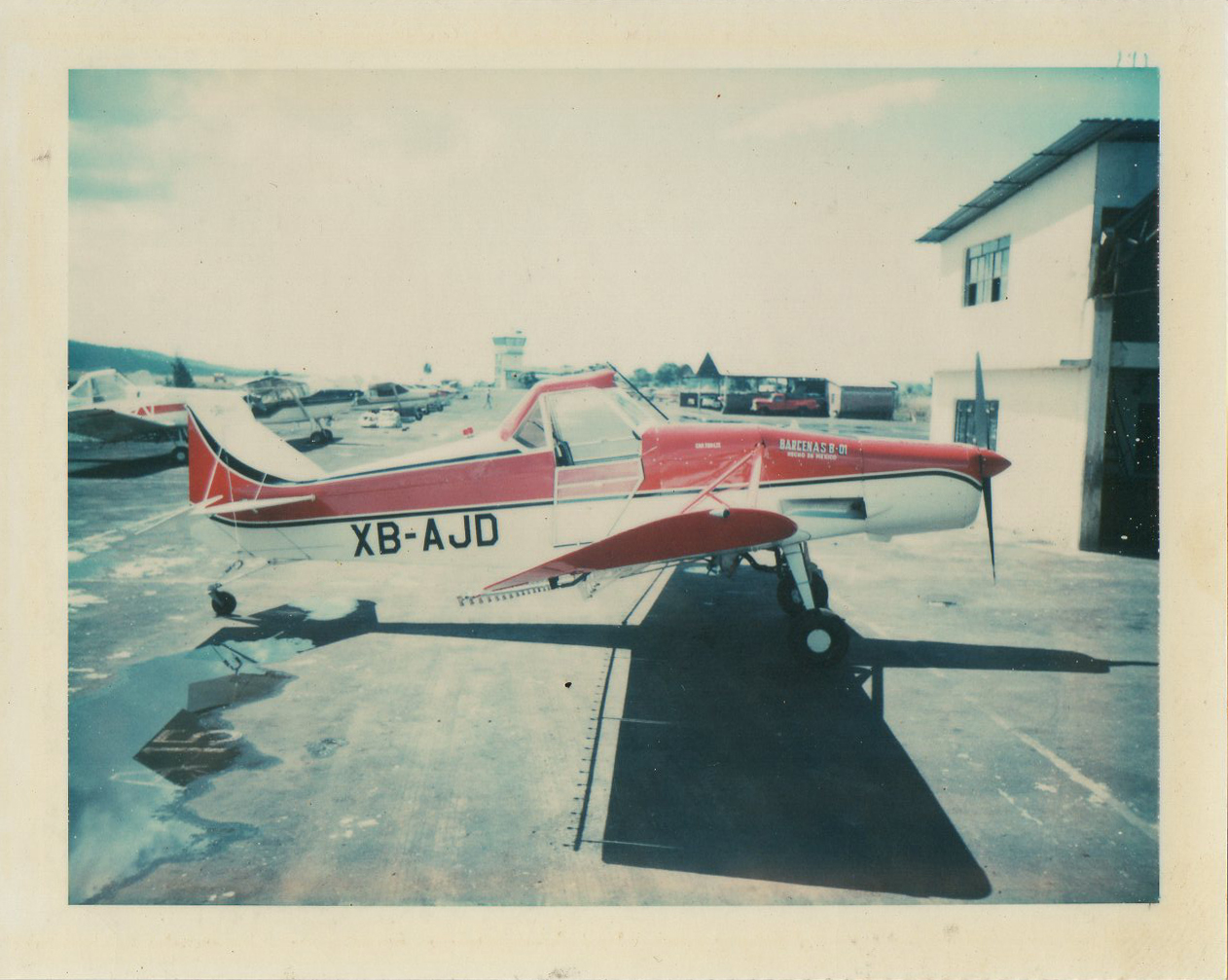
Bárcenas B-01 at Culiacán International Airport.

The Bárcenas B-01 is a low-wing monoplane agricultural aircraft built by Aeroservicio Bárcenas S.A.

== Development ==
Aeroservicio Bárcenas began operating as repair and maintenance workshops for aircraft at Uruapan Airport in the early 60's, then, in the early 70's began designing and developing an agricultural aircraft whose first flight was made on June 8, 1973 and was certified by the DGAC on November 30 of the same year. The aircraft had an alar profile called "Bárcenas airfoil", which allowed it better support and control than its competitors at that time, the design of that wing profile was later used by the National Polytechnic Institute and the Navy of Mexico in the design and assembly of the Tonatiuh MX-1 aircraft, which was used by Mexican Naval Aviation as an observation and reconnaissance aircraft.

In December 1978, the General Directorate of Civil Aeronautics published the results of a study titled Agricultural Aircraft and its Construction, in which the College of Mexican Engineers in Aeronautics, the Federation of Pilots and Owners of Agricultural Aircraft of the Mexican Republic intervened. Nacional Financiera SA, the General Directorate of Parastatal Basic Industries of the Ministry of Heritage and Industrial Development and the DGAC. In this work were analyzed and compared the characteristics of the following aircraft, then commercially available for agricultural use: Anahuac Tauro 300, AAMSA Quail A-9-B, Bárcenas B-01, Piper Pawnee 235 D, Piper Pawnee 260D, Piper PA-36 Pawnee Brave, Cessna Agwagon, Cessna AGtruck, Weatherly 201C, Grumman Agcat 164B, Grumman Agcat 164C, Embraer Ipanema 201B, Trush Commander 600 and Trush Commander 800. The acquisition costs, operating costs, useful life, maintenance facilities, performance, versatility and maneuverability were taken into account. The verdict was as follows: it was feasible to manufacture this type of aircraft in Mexico, there was sufficient demand, its financing was possible, there was infrastructure for the installation of the company and the "ideal plane" was between the Bárcenas B-01 and the Piper Pawnee 260.

Sixteen aircraft were built between 1973 and 1982, costing in the last year US$52,000 (about 130,000 current dollars).

== End of production ==
In the 70's there were 3 aircraft factories in Mexico, however, SAGARPA authorized the importation of 130 agricultural aircraft, leaving Mexican companies out of competition, as well as the National Rural Credit Bank, which ordered the manufacture of 11 aircraft to Anahuac and Bárcenas. for the Tehuantepec region and finally it did not finance the manufacture of the same, among those aircraft, Embraer EMB 201B of Brazilian manufacture was imported at a lower price than Bárcenas B-01.

== ASA Chac ==
It was an agricultural aircraft developed by the National Polytechnic Institute and Airports and Auxiliary Services and produced by the Airport and Auxiliary Services Workshops at the Mexico City Airport in the early 80's. In 1981, ASA acquired the Bárcenas B-01 manufacturing license whose design was only altered in terms of the wing profile, because instead of using the Bárcenas Profile, a NACA 23012 profile was used. Three prototypes of this aircraft were constructed, The third prototype was donated to the IPN by ASA on February 27, 1989, on the condition that it would not be commercialized.

== Specifications ==
Data from Mexican Documents of Research

General characteristics

- Crew: 1
- Length: 24 ft 7 in (7.5 m)
- Wingspan: 36 ft 1 in (11 m)
- Height: 9 ft 0 in (2.75 m)
- Wing area: 189 sq ft (17.6 m^{2})
- Airfoil: Bárcenas Airfoil (B-01) / NACA 23012 (Chac)
- Empty weight: 1,653 lb (750 kg)
- Max takeoff weight: 3,197 lb (1,450 kg)
- Fuel capacity: 46.2 gal. (175 L)
- Powerplant: 1 × Lycoming O-540 6-cyl. air-cooled horizontally opposed piston engine, 235 hp (175 kW)

Performance

- Cruise speed: 75 kn (86 mph, 138 km/h)
- Range: 150 nmi (173 mi, 278 km)
- Rate of climb: 460 ft/min (2.3 m/s)
