= Fernando Guillén =

Fernando Guillén is the name of:

- Fernando Guillén (fencer) (1895–1925), Spanish fencer
- Fernando Guillén (actor) (1932–2013), Spanish actor
- Fernando Guillén Cuervo (born 1963), Spanish actor, son of above

== See also ==
- Guillén
