= Anahuac Tauro =

Tauro

General information
- Type: Agricultural aircraft
- Manufacturer: Fabrica de Aviones Anahuac
- Number built: 12

History
- First flight: 3 December 1968

The Anahuac Tauro is a Mexican agricultural aircraft built in small numbers in the late 1960s and 1970s. The first prototype flew on 3 December 1968, with Mexican Type certification (the first type approved by Mexico's DGAC) following on 8 August 1969. It was a low-wing braced monoplane of conventional configuration with fixed tailwheel undercarriage. The wing was of constant chord and had spray bars installed along its trailing edge.

== Variants ==
- Tauro 300 - prototype and seven production examples with 300 hp R-755-A2M1 engine.
- Tauro 350 - four examples with 350 hp R-755-SM engine

== Specifications (Tauro 350) ==
Data from Jane's All The World's Aircraft 1980-81

General characteristics

- Crew: 1
- Capacity: 870 L (190 imp gal; 230 US gal) of liquid or 800 kg (1,800 lb) of dry chemicals
- Length: 8.21 m (26 ft 11 in)
- Wingspan: 11.44 m (37 ft 6 in)
- Height: 2.34 m (7 ft 8 in)
- Wing area: 20.24 m^{2} (217.9 sq ft)
- Aspect ratio: 6.4:1
- Airfoil: US 35B
- Empty weight: 958 kg (2,112 lb)
- Max takeoff weight: 2,064 kg (4,550 lb)
- Fuel capacity: 140 L (31 imp gal; 37 US gal)
- Powerplant: 1 × Jacobs R-755-SM turbocharged seven-cylinder radial engine, 260 kW (350 hp)
- Propellers: 2-bladed Sensenich 5404/MA 96K, 2.44 m (8 ft 0 in) diameter

Performance

- Maximum speed: 193 km/h (120 mph, 104 kn) at sea level
- Cruise speed: 137 km/h (85 mph, 74 kn) at 1,525 m (5,000 ft) (econ. cruise)
- Stall speed: 68 km/h (42 mph, 37 kn)
- Never exceed speed: 225 km/h (140 mph, 121 kn)
- Range: 375 km (233 mi, 202 nmi)
- Service ceiling: 5,790 m (19,000 ft)
- Rate of climb: 4.3 m/s (850 ft/min)
- Takeoff run to and landing run from 15 m (50 ft): 350 m (1,150 ft)

== See also ==
- Bárcenas B-01
- CallAir A-9
