= Harry Crawshaw =

English cricketer (born 2003)

Personal information
- Full name: Harry Michael Crawshaw
- Born: 16 July 2003 (age 23); Hartlepool, County Durham, England
- Batting: Left-handed
- Bowling: Slow left-arm orthodox

Domestic team information
- Years: Team
- 2021: Durham
- T20 debut: 30 June 2021 Durham v Northamptonshire

Career statistics
Competition	Twenty20
Matches	3
Runs scored	9
Batting average	4.50
100s/50s	0/0
Top score	5
Balls bowled	30
Wickets	0
Bowling average	–
5 wickets in innings	–
10 wickets in match	–
Best bowling	–
Catches/stumpings	0/–
- Source: Cricinfo, 25 September 2021

Harry Michael Crawshaw (born 16 July 2003) is an English cricketer. He made his Twenty20 debut on 30 June 2021, for Durham in the 2021 T20 Blast.
