= Quillen =

Quillen is a surname of Irish origin. It could refer to:

- Carol Quillen, American professor and academic administrator
- Daniel Quillen (1940–2011), American mathematician
- Ford C. Quillen (1938–2026), American attorney and politician from Virginia
- Frank Quillen (1920–1990), American football player
- Jimmy Quillen (1916–2003), American politician from Tennessee
- Lee Quillen (1882–1965), American baseball player
- Robert Quillen (1887–1948), American journalist and humorist
- William T. Quillen (1935–2016), American judge from Delaware

== See also ==
- Guillen
- East Tennessee State University James H. Quillen College of Medicine, named for Jimmy Quillen
