= Rosalinda Guillen =

American activist (born 1951)

- Born: December 28, 1951 (age 74); Haskell, Texas
- Organization(s): United Farm Workers, Community to Community Development

Rosalinda Guillen (born 1951) is a farmworker and community organizer from Washington state. She was a leading organizer in a union drive at the Chateau Ste. Michelle winery in the Yakima Valley from 1987 to 1995 and is the founder of the nonprofit Community to Community Development.

== Early life ==
Guillen was born in Texas but spent most of her childhood in Coahuila, Mexico. Her father came from a Tarascan indigenous village in Michoacán but began working as a migrant laborer in Texas after his father died. Her mother grew up as an orphan in Coahuila. Guillen moved with her family to La Conner, Washington when she was ten years old and lived in a farmworker labor camp, helping her parents in the fields when she was not in school. At age 17, Guillen got married and worked with her spouse as a migrant farmworker. She later worked at Skagit County Bank for sixteen years.

== Organizing activities ==
Guillen first became politically involved through the Rainbow Coalition, where she was trained as a community organizer for Jesse Jackson's 1988 presidential campaign. Through this work, she learned about a farmworker organizing drive at Chateau Ste. Michelle winery in the Yakima Valley by the United Farm Workers of Washington (independent at the time from the United Farm Workers). Guillen became involved in the organizing campaign, and she became one of the leading organizers and was the head of the campaign from 1993 to 1995. As an organizer, Guillen used the tactics she had learned from the Rainbow Coalition to build community support for the campaign, including by creating agreements with unions to boycott Chateau Ste. Michelle products. Guillen was also able to cut across sexism and help many women farmworkers become involved in the campaign. Despite numerous union busting attempts by the winery, in 1995, workers voted to ratify a union contract. This represented a victory for farmworkers and was the first binding labor contract between farmworkers and an agricultural employer in the state of Washington.

Following the Chateau Ste. Michelle campaign, Guillen remained active in the farmworker labor movement and the United Farm Workers (UFW Washington voted to affiliate with the national organization in 1994). She was sent to Salinas, California to help organize strawberry pickers, and she later held the position of national vice president for the UFW. Guillen also was involved in La Unión del Pueblo Entero (LUPE), a nonprofit started by Cesar Chavez.

Guillen founded Community to Community Development, a grassroots women of color-led organization that advocates for farmworker rights and food sovereignty based in Bellingham, Washington. She supported the creation of the farmworkers union Familias Unidas por la Justicia in Whatcom County and was active in the union's boycott of Sakuma Farms and Driscoll's.

== Political beliefs ==
Guillen cites Cesar Chavez as her inspiration and has also been influenced by the Landless Workers' Movement in Brazil. She considers farmworkers in the United States to be the country's largest landless workforce and advocates for their rights to own the land they work on. She opposes piece rates and instead supports paying farmworkers an hourly wage. Guillen has spoken and written about the effects of pesticides on farmworker health and other issues related to agricultural working conditions. She is also an advocate for undocumented immigrants, who she claims make up a large proportion of the agricultural workforce.

In addition to being involved with Jesse Jackson's presidential campaigns, Guillen served as the Whatcom County Democrats Affirmative Action Chair.
