= Logan van Beek =

Dutch-New Zealand cricketer

Personal information
- Full name: Logan Verjus van Beek
- Born: 7 September 1990 (age 36); Christchurch, New Zealand
- Batting: Right-handed
- Bowling: Right-arm medium-fast
- Role: Bowling-all rounder
- Relatives: Victor Guillen (great-grandfather); Sammy Guillen (grandfather); Justin Guillen (cousin)

International information
- National side: Netherlands (2014–present)
- ODI debut (cap 72): 19 May 2021 v Scotland
- Last ODI: 29 July 2026 v Nepal
- ODI shirt no.: 17
- T20I debut (cap 30): 17 March 2014 v UAE
- Last T20I: 18 February 2026 v India
- T20I shirt no.: 17 (formerly 90)

Domestic team information
- Years: Team
- 2009/10–2016/17: Canterbury
- 2017/18–present: Wellington
- 2019, 2021: Derbyshire
- 2023–2024: Worcestershire
- 2025: Leicestershire
- 2026: Yorkshire
- 2026: Rotterdam Dockers

Career statistics
Competition	ODI	T20I	FC	LA
Matches	38	35	107	156
Runs scored	526	108	2,989	1,787
Batting average	21.91	7.20	24.70	19.42
100s/50s	0/1	0/0	2/13	1/5
Top score	59	23	111*	136
Balls bowled	1,905	648	16,999	6,818
Wickets	55	43	303	203
Bowling average	31.18	19.55	31.70	31.59
5 wickets in innings	0	0	10	1
10 wickets in match	0	0	2	0
Best bowling	4/24	4/27	6/46	6/18
Catches/stumpings	20/–	17/–	63/–	83/–
- Source: Cricinfo, 31 July 2026

Logan Verjus van Beek (born 7 September 1990) is a New Zealand-Dutch cricketer. He has played for the Netherlands national cricket team since 2012 and represents Wellington in New Zealand domestic cricket. He is an all-rounder who bats right-handed and bowls right-arm fast-medium.

In June 2023, he became an overnight sensation for his blitz in the super over against the West Indies at the 2023 Cricket World Cup Qualifier where he scored 30 runs with the bat and also cleaned up the West Indies side with his bowling, claiming both the wickets.

== Early life ==
Van Beek was born in Christchurch, New Zealand. He holds a Dutch passport through his paternal grandparents, who immigrated to New Zealand in the 1950s. On his mother's side he is the grandson of former Test cricketer Sammy Guillen, a dual international for the West Indies and New Zealand who was born in Trinidad.

Van Beek was in the New Zealand squad for Under-19 World Cup in 2010. He also played high-level youth basketball as a point guard, representing New Zealand at the 2009 FIBA Under-19 World Championship.

== Career ==
Van Beek first played for the Netherlands against English county Essex in the 2012 Clydesdale Bank 40. He had to play as an overseas professional as under ICC regulations he had to wait three years after playing for New Zealand to qualify for the Netherlands. His first major international tournament for the Netherlands was the 2014 ICC World Twenty20 in Bangladesh.

He scored his maiden first-class century on 24 October 2015 in the Plunket Shield. In November 2017, in the 2017–18 Plunket Shield season, he took his maiden 10-wicket match haul in first-class cricket. In March 2018, in round six of the Plunket Shield, he took a hat-trick for Wellington against Canterbury. He was the leading wicket-taker in the 2017–18 Plunket Shield for Wellington, with 40 dismissals in seven matches. In June 2018, he was awarded a contract with Wellington for the 2018–19 season.

In December 2018, he was signed by the English side Derbyshire for the 2019 County Championship season. In April 2020, he was one of seventeen Dutch-based cricketers to be named in the team's senior squad. In June 2020, he was offered a contract by Wellington ahead of the 2020–21 domestic cricket season.

He was a member of the Dutch One Day International (ODI) squad for their series against Scotland. He made his ODI debut on 19 May 2021, for the Netherlands against Scotland. In September 2021, van Beek was named in the Dutch squad for the 2021 ICC Men's T20 World Cup.

In July 2022, he was named in the Dutch squad for the 2022 ICC Men's T20 World Cup Global Qualifier B tournament in Zimbabwe. In their group match against Hong Kong, he became the first bowler for the Netherlands to take a hat-trick in a T20I match.

In 2023, he was signed by Worcestershire County Cricket Club to play in the One-Day Cup and the County Championship. In 2024, he returned for a second stint at the club.

In May 2024, he was named in the Netherlands squad for the 2024 ICC Men's T20 World Cup tournament.

In February 2025, he was signed by Leicestershire County Cricket Club.

== Breakthrough ==
On 26 June 2023, he was instrumental in Netherlands dramatic upset victory over the West Indies during a crucial encounter at the 2023 Cricket World Cup Qualifier by showing his all-round prowess in the super over after the match had ended in a tie. Netherlands batted second in pursuit of a huge run chase of 375 and ended up levelling the score of the West Indies by ending at 374/9. Logan initially scored a quickfire 28 runs off just 14 deliveries during Netherlands batting innings. Logan arrived at the crease at number eight position when Netherlands were reeling at 327/7 with the Netherlands still needing 47 runs off the last three overs of the innings.

He was later sent by Dutch camp to open the batting alongside skipper Scott Edwards in the super over and Logan van Beek faced all six deliveries in the super over bowled by Jason Holder and subsequently Logan van Beek made the most of the errors in judgement in line and length of Holder by smashing 30 runs including 3 fours and 3 sixes. Netherlands broke the world record for amassing the most runs in a super over in any format at international level surpassing the previous best of 25 made by West Indies. Logan also eventually set a world record for being the batsman with scoring most number of runs in a super over in international cricket.

Logan later went onto bowl the super over and he was remarkably successful in defending the total by conceding only 8 runs while bowling out the West Indies by claiming both the wickets. His heroics both with the ball and bat eventually sealed the deal for the Dutch which also marked Netherlands first ever win over West Indies in any format in international cricket and also the win further boosted Netherlands chances of securing possible berth for 2023 Cricket World Cup. For his breathtaking all-round performance, he was also adjudged the player of the match.
