= Montserrat Guillén =

Spanish statistician (born 1964)

Montserrat Guillén i Estany (born 25 January 1964) is a Spanish statistician and economist, whose research interests include actuarial science, fraud detection, and kernel density estimation. She is a professor and director of the Riskcenter in the department of econometrics at the University of Barcelona.

== Education and career ==
Guillén earned a master's degree in mathematics and mathematical statistics at the University of Barcelona in 1987, and a Ph.D. in economics from the University of Barcelona in 1992. She also has a master's degree in social science data analysis from the University of Essex (1993) and another master's degree in risk management and insurance from the National University of Distance Education (2006).

She has held faculty positions at the University of Barcelona since 1993, and became full professor in 2001. In 2012 and 2019 she was named a distinguished professor by the Catalan Institution for Research and Advanced Studies.

== Books ==
Guillén is the co-author of books including:

- Risk Quantification and Allocation Methods for Practitioners (with Belles-Sampera and Santolino, University of Chicago Press, 2017)
- Quantitative Operational Risk Models (with Bolancé, Gustafsson, and Nielsen, Chapman & Hall/CRC, 2012)

== Academic societies ==
Guillén is a member of the Royal European Academy of Doctors and the Royal Academy of Economic and Financial Sciences, both based in Barcelona. She also served as president of the European Group of Risk and Insurance Economists in 2012.
