= Hannia Guillen =

Cuban-American actress (born 1982)

- Born: 1982 (age 43–44); Ciego de Ávila, Cuba
- Occupation: Actress

Hannia Guillen (born 1982 in Ciego de Ávila, Cuba) is a Cuban-American actress. She is best known for her portrayal of Paloma Lopez-Fitzgerald on the NBC daytime television soap opera Passions from October 16, 2007, to 2008. She also had a supporting role in an episode of the TV series Burn Notice, playing the upwardly-mobile girlfriend of an Israeli gun runner.

== Biography ==
Guillen and her family emigrated to the United States from Cuba in 1993. She holds an Associate of Arts degree from Miami Dade College.
