= Jordan Thompson (cricketer) =

English cricketer (born 1996)

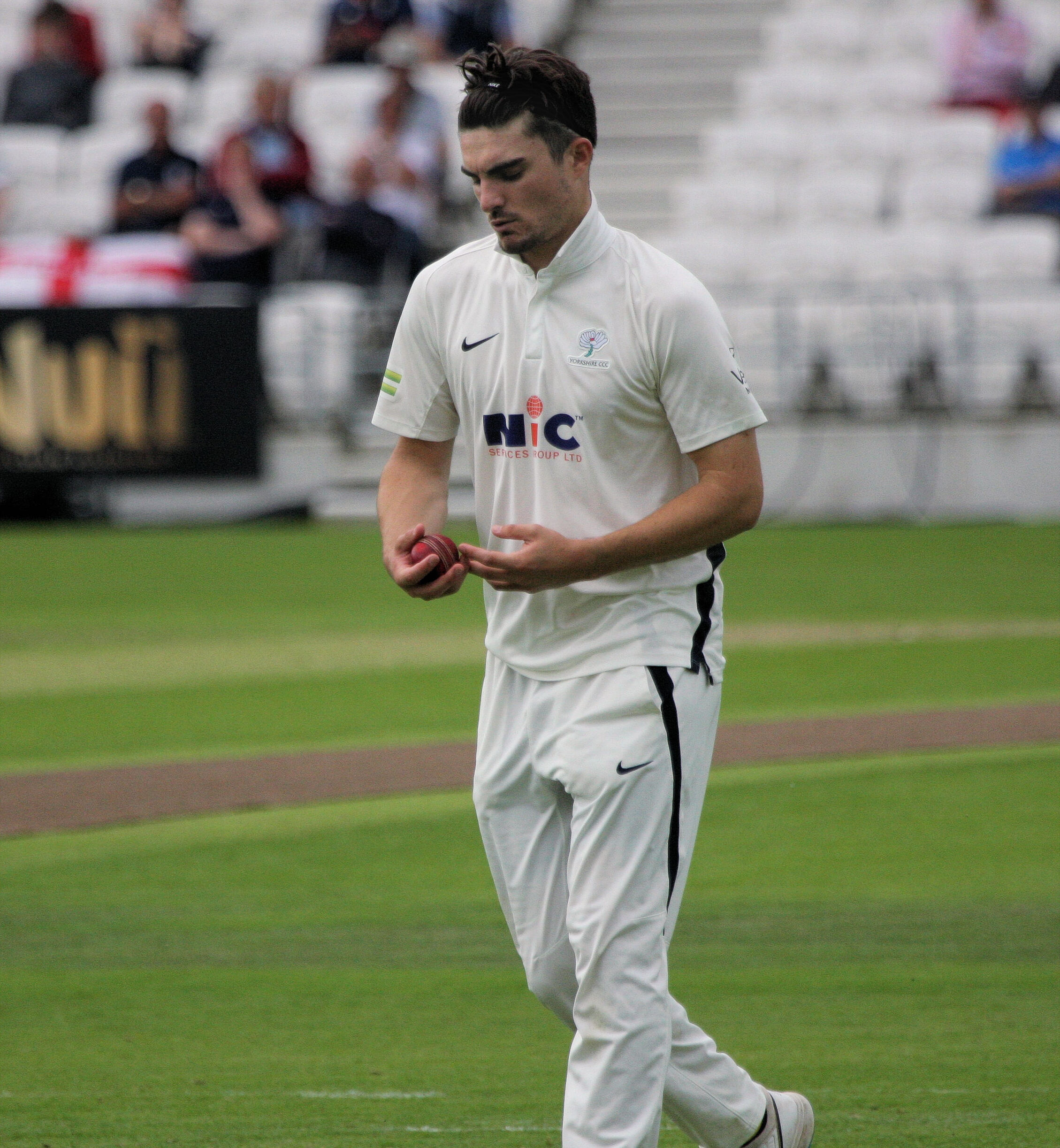
- Thompson in 2021

Personal information
- Full name: Jordan Aaron Thompson
- Born: 9 October 1996 (age 30); Leeds, West Yorkshire, England
- Batting: Left-handed
- Bowling: Right-arm medium-fast
- Role: Bowling All-rounder

Domestic team information
- Years: Team
- 2018–2025: Yorkshire (squad no. 44)
- 2021: Northern Superchargers
- 2021/22: Hobart Hurricanes
- 2021/22: Karachi Kings
- 2022–2023: London Spirit
- 2024: MI Emirates
- 2024: Trent Rockets
- 2025: Southern Brave
- 2026–: Warwickshire (squad no. 44)
- 2026: Birmingham Phoenix
- FC debut: 10 June 2019 Yorkshire v Surrey
- LA debut: 6 May 2019 Yorkshire v Durham

Career statistics
Competition	FC	LA	T20
Matches	74	2	142
Runs scored	2,107	6	1,388
Batting average	23.15	–	17.35
100s/50s	0/13	0/0	0/5
Top score	98	6*	74
Balls bowled	10,662	90	2,367
Wickets	205	3	146
Bowling average	28.68	30.00	25.76
5 wickets in innings	4	0	1
10 wickets in match	0	0	0
Best bowling	5/31	3/47	5/21
Catches/stumpings	21/–	1/–	46/–
- Source: Cricinfo, 4 September 2026

Jordan Aaron Thompson (born 9 October 1996) is an English cricketer. He made his Twenty20 debut for Yorkshire in the 2018 T20 Blast on 15 July 2018. He made his List A debut on 6 May 2019, for Yorkshire in the 2019 Royal London One-Day Cup.

Thompson made his first-class debut on 10 June 2019, for Yorkshire in the 2019 County Championship match at Guildford against Surrey. In April 2022, he was bought by the London Spirit for the 2022 season of The Hundred. In June 2025, it was announced that Thompson had signed a three-year contract to join Warwickshire from 1 November that year.
