= Rob Jones (cricketer) =

English cricketer (born 1995)

Personal information
- Full name: Robert Peter Jones
- Born: 3 November 1995 (age 31); Warrington, Cheshire, England
- Batting: Right-handed
- Bowling: Right-arm leg break

Domestic team information
- Years: Team
- 2016–2023: Lancashire (squad no. 12)
- 2023: → Worcestershire (on loan)
- 2024–2025: Worcestershire (squad no. 88)
- First-class debut: 23 August 2016 Lancashire v Surrey
- List A debut: 31 May 2018 Lancashire v Leicestershire

Career statistics
Competition	FC	LA	T20
Matches	64	53	41
Runs scored	2,327	1,489	432
Batting average	25.57	40.24	33.23
100s/50s	3/10	2/10	0/1
Top score	122	122	61*
Balls bowled	114	122	6
Wickets	2	2	0
Bowling average	25.00	61.00	–
5 wickets in innings	0	0	–
10 wickets in match	0	0	–
Best bowling	1/4	1/3	–
Catches/stumpings	79/–	30/–	18/–
- Source: ESPNcricinfo, 26 September 2025

Robert Peter Jones (born 3 November 1995) is an English cricketer who plays for Worcestershire County Cricket Club, having previously made 109 appearances for Lancashire in all formats between 2016 and 2023. He is a right-handed batsman who also bowls right-arm leg spin.

He made his first-class debut on 23 August 2016, for Lancashire against Surrey in the County Championship, and scored his maiden first-class century on 14 September 2016, against Middlesex. He made his Twenty20 cricket debut for Lancashire in the 2017 NatWest T20 Blast on 16 August 2017. He made his List A debut for Lancashire in the 2018 Royal London One-Day Cup on 31 May 2018.

In July 2023, Jones rejected a two-year deal to remain with Lancashire, and accepted an offer from Worcestershire instead. He was subsequently released on loan to his new county for the 2023 One-Day Cup, and made his debut for them in the County Championship on 5 April the following year.
