= DGRCN Tonatiuh MX-1 =

High-wing monoplane utility

Tonatiuh MX-1

General information
- Type: Utility aircraft Trainer aircraft Reconnaissance aircraft
- National origin: Mexico
- Manufacturer: Dirección General de Reparaciones y Construcciones Navales
- Designer: César Trujillo Carrillo
- Status: Retired (2006)
- Number built: 8

History
- First flight: June 1, 1980
- Variant: Bárcenas B-01

The Tonatiuh MX-1 was a lightweight, high-wing monoplane built by the Secretariat of the Navy of Mexico in collaboration with the Instituto Politécnico Nacional (National Polytechnic Institute).

== Design and development ==
The project began in 1977 when a group of engineers from the IPN reconstructed a Piper PA-18, after several discussions it was decided that it was better to design an own aircraft which was initially called Project CIAAC 7701. The design and calculation works were done under the name of TONATIUH Project in the offices of the General Directorate of Repairs and Naval Construction. Engineer César Trujillo was appointed by the Secretariat of the Navy to advice on the construction of the first prototype, beginning work in 1978 at the Aeronaval Station of the Mexico City International Airport.

The Tonatiuh MX-1 bases its design almost entirely on the Bárcenas B-01 agricultural aircraft, since it shares components and design such as the wing profile, beams, ribs and tensioners with this aircraft. The wing section was designed for the needs of the Tonatiuh and many of the metal components were manufactured by the company CUPRUM, who also made components for the Bárcenas B-01.

The first prototype was ready in April 1980 and once it was built, it was disarmed and sent to the Veracruz Air Base, where it was rebuilt and prepared for its first flight. During the first flight tests there were problems with the tail skate and the control surfaces of the rudder and the ailerons, so all these systems were redesigned, all in order to start their first flight on June 1, 1980, on the day of the Navy. On his first flight, he made low-altitude maneuvers near the Malecón de Veracruz, in conjunction with the Tonatiuh, other Bonanza and Albatross aircraft performed acrobatics in the sea and near many ships.

The development of the plane cost only 2 million pesos in the late 70's (about $80,700 at that time, about $290,000 today), which is said to have been a success because developing a light aircraft with similar characteristics in the United States would have cost 21 times more, in addition they had to create in Mexico the necessary tools for its construction. The Tonatiuh MX-1 was also 35% cheaper than its foreign competitor, the Piper PA-18.

In 1982 the Navy of Mexico acquired six of the eight manufactured aircraft, which remained in service until 2006, using them as a training, observation and reconnaissance aircraft.

== Specifications ==
Data from TONATIUH MX-1 Airplane - Mexico

General characteristics

- Crew: 2
- Length: 23 ft 0 in (7 m)
- Wingspan: 32 ft 10 in (10 m)
- Height: 7 ft 0 in (2.13 m)
- Airfoil: Bárcenas Airfoil
- Empty weight: 770 lb (349 kg)
- Powerplant: 1 × Lycoming O-320 4-cyl. air-cooled horizontally opposed piston engine, 160 hp (120 kW)

Performance

- Maximum speed: 105 kn (121 mph, 195 km/h)
- Endurance: 3.5 hours
