= Freddie Heldreich =

English cricketer (born 2001)

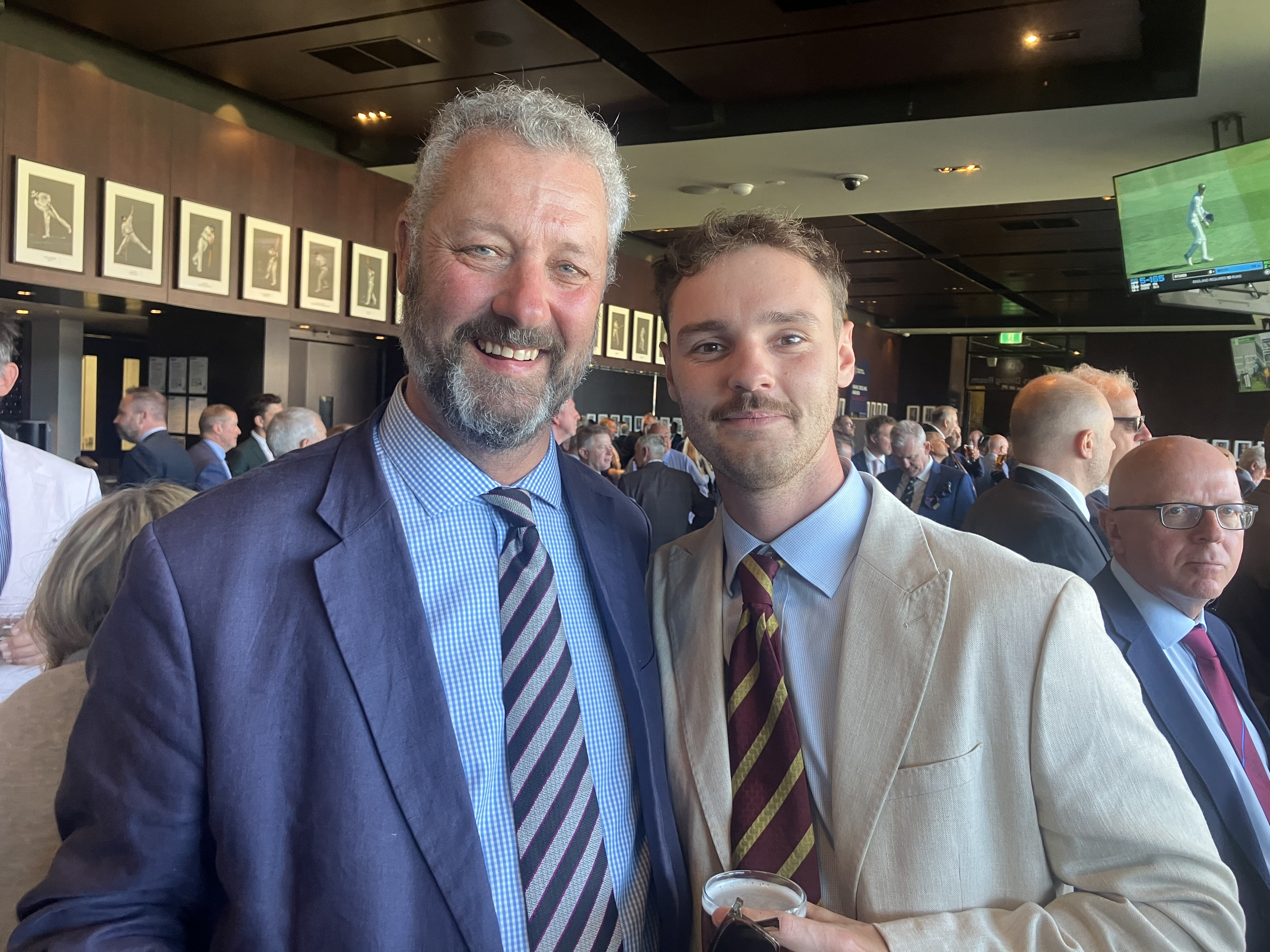
- Freddie (right) with his father, Richard

Personal information
- Full name: Frederick James Heldreich
- Born: 12 September 2001 (age 25); Ipswich, Suffolk, England
- Batting: Left-handed
- Bowling: Slow left-arm unorthodox
- Role: Bowler

Domestic team information
- Years: Team
- 2021–present: Northamptonshire (squad no. 80)
- LA debut: 25 July 2021 Northamptonshire v Glamorgan
- T20 debut: 23 June 2021 Northamptonshire v Durham

Career statistics
Competition	LA	T20
Matches	11	44
Runs scored	8	34
Batting average	2.66	11.33
100s/50s	0/0	0/0
Top score	5	21*
Balls bowled	363	741
Wickets	6	49
Bowling average	67.50	23.06
5 wickets in innings	0	0
10 wickets in match	0	0
Best bowling	2/69	4/27
Catches/stumpings	4/–	5/–
- Source: Cricinfo, 29 September 2024

Frederick James Heldreich (born 12 September 2001) is an English cricketer. He made his Twenty20 debut on 23 June 2021, for Northamptonshire in the 2021 T20 Blast.

Heldreich was raised in Debenham before moving to Badingham, and attended Framlingham College. He spent a few months in the winter of 2020–21 at the Darren Lehmann Cricket Academy in Adelaide. He made his List A debut on 25 July 2021, for Northamptonshire in the 2021 Royal London One-Day Cup.
