= Ricardo Vasconcelos =

Portuguese-South African cricketer (born 1997)

Personal information
- Full name: Ricardo Surrador Vasconcelos
- Born: 27 October 1997 (age 29); Johannesburg, Gauteng, South Africa
- Batting: Left-handed
- Role: Wicket-keeper

Domestic team information
- Years: Team
- 2016–2018: Boland
- 2018–present: Northamptonshire (squad no. 27)
- 2025: Kathmandu Gorkhas
- FC debut: 10 November 2016 Boland v Northern Cape
- LA debut: 13 November 2016 Boland v Northern Cape

Career statistics
Competition	FC	LA	T20
Matches	110	66	78
Runs scored	6,424	1,954	1,943
Batting average	34.72	31.01	26.61
100s/50s	17/26	4/11	0/8
Top score	185*	112	88
Catches/stumpings	170/7	39/3	37/2
- Source: ESPNcricinfo, 27 September 2026

Ricardo Surrador Vasconcelos (born 27 October 1997) is a Portuguese–South African cricketer, who plays domestically for Northamptonshire.

He made his first-class debut for Boland in the 2016–17 Sunfoil 3-Day Cup on 10 November 2016. He made his List A debut for Boland in the 2016–17 CSA Provincial One-Day Challenge on 13 November 2016. He made his Twenty20 debut for Boland in the 2017 Africa T20 Cup on 15 September 2017.

In March 2018, he was signed by Northamptonshire ahead of the English cricket season. He holds a Portuguese passport, making him eligible to qualify as a non-overseas player in England.

On 26 March 2022, he was appointed as club captain in first-class cricket, having previously led the List A team during the 2021 season. He resigned during the season and was replaced by Will Young.
