= Tonatiuh Guillén López =

Mexican academic and government official

- Education: Universidad Autónoma Metropolitana; El Colegio de México
- Occupation: Academic
- Known for: Mexico's immigration chief

Tonatiuh Guillén López is a Mexican academic and government official. From December 2018 to June 2019, he served as the commissioner of the Instituto Nacional de Migración (Mexico's immigration chief) under President Andrés Manuel López Obrador. He was the president of the Colegio de la Frontera Norte (COLEF), a Mexican public university focused on graduate education, from 2007 to 2017.
