= Noel Guillen =

Trinidadian cricketer (1926–1987)

Personal information
- Born: 15 December 1926; Trinidad
- Died: 4 June 1987 (aged 60); Trinidad
- Source: Cricinfo, 28 November 2020

Noel Guillen (15 December 1926 – 4 June 1987) was a Trinidadian cricketer. He played in three first-class matches for Trinidad and Tobago from 1951 to 1959.

== See also ==
- List of Trinidadian representative cricketers
