= List of Durham County Cricket Club grounds =

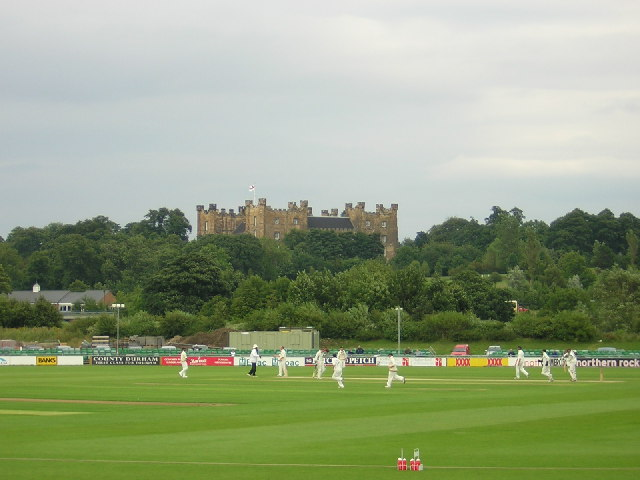
The Riverside Ground in Chester-le-Street has only been in use since 1995 but has hosted the vast majority of the county's matches in that time.

Durham County Cricket Club is one of the 18 member clubs of the English County Championship, representing the historic county of Durham. The club was established on 23 May 1882. The county entered the Minor Counties Championship in 1895 and competed with great success in the competition until 1991, after which it was elevated to first-class status for the 1992 season, and has played first-class cricket since. While still a minor county, Durham first played List A cricket in 1964, and has played Twenty20 cricket since 2003.

The Racecourse Ground in Durham staged the club's first home fixture in first-class cricket in 1992 which was against Leicestershire, while Feethams played host to the club's first home List A match in 1964, a match against Hertfordshire, with the Riverside Ground in Chester-le-Street being the venue for the club's first Twenty20 match in 2003, the game against Nottinghamshire. Durham have played home matches at 22 grounds, but have played the majority of their home fixtures since elevation to first-class status at the Riverside Ground, which also holds Test, One Day International and Twenty20 International cricket matches.

The 22 grounds that Durham have used for home matches since 1895 are listed below, with statistics complete through to the end of the 2014 season.

== Grounds ==
=== Minor county ===
Below is a complete list of grounds used by Durham County Cricket Club in Minor Counties Championship and MCCA Knockout Trophy matches before its elevation to first-class status in 1992. The list excludes List A matches played by Durham when they were a minor county

Name	Location	First	Last	Matches	First	Last	Matches	Refs
Name	Location	Minor Counties Championship			MCCA Trophy			Refs
Bunker Hill	Philadelphia	3 June 1895 v Lincolnshire	21 July 1902 v Staffordshire	3	–	–	0	
Feethams Cricket Ground	Darlington	24 June 1895 v Cheshire	18 July 1990 v Staffordshire	37	–	–	0	
Ashbrooke	Sunderland	26 June 1895 v Staffordshire	30 May 1989 v Hertfordshire	40	only match: 5 June 1988 v Lincolnshire		1	
Station Road	Norton	15 July 1895 v Worcestershire	20 June 1938 v Staffordshire	3	–	–	0	
Village Ground	Bournmoor	25 May 1896 v Northumberland	6 July 1921 v Cheshire	6	–	–	0	
Clarence Road Ground	Hartlepool	5 July 1897 v Cambridgeshire	29 June 1908 v Lincolnshire	9	–	–	0	
Prince Consort Road	Gateshead	19 July 1897 v Norfolk	25 June 1928 v Cheshire	3	–	–	0	
Wood Terrace	South Shields	11 July 1899 v Cambridgeshire	22 August 1990 v Lincolnshire	62	only match: 6 July 1986 v Hertfordshire		1	
Green Lane	Durham	4 August 1899 v Norfolk	12 June 1984 v Bedfordshire	13	22 May 1988 v Northumberland	4 June 1989 v Cumberland	2	
Ropery Lane	Chester-le-Street	3 August 1903 v Northumberland	29 May 1990 v Bedfordshire	65	2 June 1985 v Northumberland	30 June 1985 v Cheshire	2	(Note: The Durham Cricket Board played four MCCA Knockout Trophy matches here between 1999–2001. Only the MCCA Knockout Trophy matches played at the ground by Durham are recorded in the table.)
Carley Hill Ground	Sunderland	15 August 1904 v Bedfordshire	18 August 1965 v Warwickshire Second XI	12	–	–	0	
Blackfyne	Consett	27 July 1911 v Norfolk	21 August 1979 v Cheshire	47	–	–	0	
Park Drive	Hartlepool	11 June 1913 v Lincolnshire	28 May 1991 v Hertfordshire	39	–	–	0	
South Moor Cricket Club Ground	Stanley	only match: 22 July 1914 v Cheshire		1	–	–	0	
Belasis Lane	Billingham	22 June 1936 v Yorkshire Second XI	19 June 1939 v Yorkshire Second XI	3	–	–	0	
Grangefield Road	Stockton-on-Tees	9 July 1947 v Staffordshire	21 August 1991 v Suffolk	24	–	–	0	
Kingsway	Bishop Auckland	17 July 1950 v Staffordshire	21 June 1961 v Staffordshire	12	–	–	0	
Eastwood Gardens	Gateshead	24 June 1959 v Staffordshire	4 August 1991 v Northumberland	17	only match: 6 June 1985 v Wiltshire		1	(Note: The Durham Cricket Board played two MCCA Knockout Trophy matches here in 1998 and 2001. Only the MCCA Knockout Trophy match played at the ground by Durham is recorded in the table.)
The Racecourse	Durham	only match: 19 August 1991 v Norfolk		1	–	–	0	

=== First-class county ===
Below is a complete list of grounds used by Durham County Cricket Club in first-class, List A and Twenty20 matches following its elevation to first-class status in 1992. The table includes List A matches played by Durham when they were a minor county

Name	Location	First	Last	Matches	First	Last	Matches	First	Last	Matches	Refs
Name	Location	First-class			List A			Twenty20			Refs
The Racecourse	Durham	25 April 1992 v Leicestershire	18 July 1994 v Yorkshire	8	19 April 1992 v Lancashire	31 July 1994 v Yorkshire	7	–	–	0	(Note: Durham MCCU use the ground for first-class matches. Only the first-class matches played at the ground by Durham are recorded in the table. The Marylebone Cricket Club played one List A match at the ground against Bangladesh A in 2008. Only the List A matches played at the ground by Durham are recorded in the table.)
Osborne Avenue	Jesmond	–	–	0	only match: 5 May 1992 v Derbyshire		1	–	–	0	(Note: Osborne Avenue is located in the adjacent county of Northumberland. Northumberland, a combined Minor Counties team, Minor Counties East, and Minor Counties North have all played List A matches at the ground. Only the List A match played by Durham at the ground is recorded in the table.)
Grangefield Road	Stockton-on-Tees	23 May 1992 v Northamptonshire	13 June 2006 v Kent	12	24 May 1992 v Northamptonshire	23 June 1996 v Surrey	11	–	–	0	
Feethams Cricket Ground	Darlington	2 June 1992 v Somerset	10 July 2002 v Derbyshire	10	4 May 1964 v Hertfordshire	2 July 2000 v Derbyshire	14	–	–	0	(Note: A combined Minor Counties cricket team played one List A match here in the 1988 Benson & Hedges Cup, while the Durham Cricket Board played two List A matches here in the 2003 Cheltenham & Gloucester Trophy. Only the List A matches played at the ground by Durham are recorded in the table.)
Park Drive	Hartlepool	12 June 1992 v Essex	7 May 1997 v Nottinghamshire	8	14 June 1992 v Essex	11 May 1997 v Nottinghamshire	9	–	–	0	(Note: The Durham Cricket Board played two List A matches here in the 1999 and 2000 NatWest Trophy. Only the List A matches played at the ground by Durham are recorded in the table.)
Eastwood Gardens	Gateshead	27 June 1992 v Kent	19 May 1994 v Gloucestershire	4	26 April 1992 v Leicestershire	13 June 1993 v Middlesex	2	–	–	0	(Note: The Durham Cricket Board played two List A matches here in the 1999 and 2000 NatWest Trophy. Only the List A matches played at the ground by Durham are recorded in the table.)
Ropery Lane	Chester-le-Street	14 July 1992 v Pakistanis	12 July 1994 v South Africans	3	23 April 1967 v Nottinghamshire	5 September 1993 v Nottinghamshire	7	–	–	0	(Note: Minor Counties North played a single List A match here in the 1973 Benson & Hedges Cup. Only the List A matches played by Durham at the ground are recorded in the table.)
Riverside Ground	Chester-le-Street	18 May 1995 v Warwickshire	15 September 2014 v Northamptonshire	163	21 May 1995 v Warwickshire	6 September 2014 v Nottinghamshire	170	13 June 2003 v Nottinghamshire	25 July 2014 v Northamptonshire	56	(Note: Only the first-class, List A and Twenty20 matches played by Durham at the ground are recorded in the table.)
Roseworth Terrace	Gosforth	–	–	0	only match: 31 July 2014 v Warwickshire		1	–	–	0	(Note: Roseworth Terrace is located in the adjacent county of Northumberland.)
