= Eastwood Gardens =

Cricket ground in Gateshead, England

Coordinates: 54°56′31.88″N 1°35′38.37″W

Eastwood Gardens is a cricket ground in Gateshead, England which, like Feethams Cricket Ground, Grangefield Road, The Racecourse, Park Drive and Ropery Lane, was used by the Durham 1st XI between 1992 and 1994 prior to The Riverside Ground being built, since which it has not seen any 1st XI action. In 1992, the ground hosted two County Championship matches and one Sunday match, while in 1993 and 1994 the ground hosted one match in each of those two competitions.

Eastwood Gardens is the home of Gateshead Fell Cricket Club one of the top Club teams in the North East of England.

The ground has hosted 4 first-class matches and 5 List A matches.

Game Information:

| Game Type | No. of Games |
|---|---|
| County Championship Matches | 4 |
| List A matches | 5 |
| Twenty20 matches | 0 |

Game Statistics: first-class:

| Category | Information |
|---|---|
| Highest Team Score | Lancashire (562 against Durham) in 1992 |
| Lowest Team Score | Gloucestershire (169 against Durham) in 1994 |
| Best Batting Performance | Michael Atherton (199 Runs for Lancashire against Durham in 1992 |
| Best Bowling Performance | Richard Davis (7/64 for Kent against Durham) in 1992 |

Game Statistics: one-day matches:

| Category | Information |
|---|---|
| Highest Team Score | Durham Cricket Board (257/6 in 48.4 overs against Staffordshire) in 1999 |
| Lowest Team Score | Middlesex (158/7 in 50 overs against Durham) in 1993 |
| Best Batting Performance | Ashley Wright (112 Runs for Leicestershire Cricket Board against Durham Cricket Board) in 2000 |
| Best Bowling Performance | Neil Pullen (3/25 for Leicestershire Cricket Board against Durham Cricket Board) in 2000 |
