= Park Drive =

Park Drive may refer to:

- Park Drive (Central Park), a circular system of roadways and bike/jogging paths in New York City's Central Park
- Park Drive (cricket), a cricket ground in England
- Park Drive (Parkville), a roadway in Parkville, Victoria
- Park Drive (parkway), a roadway in Boston, Massachusetts
