= Ministry of Supply =

Former British government agency

Ministry of Supply Act 1939 (Note: Section 20(1).)
- Act of Parliament
- Parliament of the United Kingdom
- Long title: An Act to establish a Ministry of Supply and for purposes connected therewith.
- Citation: 2 & 3 Geo. 6. c. 38
- Territorial extent: England and Wales; Scotland; Northern Ireland; (Note: Section 20(2).)

Dates
- Royal assent: 13 July 1939
- Commencement: 13 July 1939 (Note: The Acts of Parliament (Commencement) Act 1793.)
- Repealed: 13 April 1975

Other legislation
- Amends: Ministers of the Crown Act 1937
- Amended by: Statute Law Revision Act 1963; Statute Law Revision Act 1964; Science and Technology Act 1965; Civil Aviation Act 1971
- Repealed by: Supply Powers Act 1975

Status: Repealed

Text of statute as originally enacted

The Ministry of Supply (MoS) was a department of the UK government formed on 1 August 1939 by the Ministry of Supply Act 1939 (2 & 3 Geo. 6. c. 38) to co-ordinate the supply of equipment to all three British armed forces, headed by the minister of Supply. A separate ministry, however, was responsible for aircraft production, and the Admiralty retained responsibilities for supplying the Royal Navy. During the War years, the MoS was based at Shell Mex House in The Strand, London.

The Ministry of Supply also took over all army research establishments in 1939. The Ministry of Aircraft Production was abolished in 1946, and the MoS took over its responsibilities for aircraft, including the associated research establishments. In the same year, it also took on increased responsibilities for atomic weapons, including the H-bomb development programme.

The Ministry of Supply was abolished in late 1959, and its responsibilities passed to the Ministry of Aviation, the War Office, and the Air Ministry. The latter two ministries were subsequently merged with the Admiralty to form the Ministry of Defence.

The Ministry of Supply instigated the Rainbow Codes designation system. This assigned a two-word codename to projects, the first word being a colour and the second a noun. As a result, secret weapon projects—including numerous nuclear weapons—were given lighthearted names such as Green Cheese, Blue Slug or Red Duster.

The minister was assisted by the Parliamentary Secretary to the Ministry of Supply.

== Second World War ==
=== Royal Ordnance Factories ===
The Ministry of Supply was responsible for building and running the Royal Ordnance Factories, which produced explosives and propellants, filled ammunition, and constructed guns and rifles. However, the Ministry of Works and/or private building contractors acted as agents during their construction.

The ministry was also responsible for the supply of tanks and other armoured fighting vehicles. W. A. Robotham of Rolls-Royce was appointed chief engineer of tank design in the ministry in November 1941. He went on the 1942 tank mission to America. Most of the technicians in the Department of Tank Design in Ivy Bridge House had been recruited at the start of hostilities, and few had the experience to advise the industry design teams. They were spread over an "immense number" of projects and lacked clear directives from the War Office general staff, so they had no clear conception of their requirements. The answer in the ministry to reports of problems was to "shoot the messenger". Industry outsiders Robotham was dealing with had the attitude that he would be "gone tomorrow", so he resigned in August 1943. He thought (which turned out to be true) that any improvements would not reach the firing line before the end of the war.

Edward Brisch worked in the Department of Tank Design from 1942.

Tanks were designed and built by private arms, engineering, and manufacturing companies, e.g. the Birmingham Railway Carriage and Wagon Company, English Electric in their Stafford Works, Leyland Motors, Nuffield Mechanizations, Vauxhall Motors, and Vickers-Armstrongs.

=== Agency factories ===
The Ministry of Supply also arranged for the construction of a large number of "agency factories", which were run on its behalf by private companies, such as Nobel Industries. These were similar to the Royal Ordnance Factories, but were not part of that organisation.

=== Labour supply ===
The Ministry of Supply was also responsible for the labour force of these factories, although the Ministry of Labour did the recruitment. From the middle of WWII onwards, the Ministry of Supply was in direct competition with the Ministry of Aircraft Production for labour, and the two organisations had to reach an agreement. Towards the end of the War, the Ministry of Supply released labour so that they could transfer to the Ministry of Aircraft Production.

=== Research establishments ===
From the beginning of the Second World War, the army research establishments were put under the control of the Ministry of Supply. Through the MoS, the essential connections were made between military requirements and the scientists and engineers of the civil service, industry, and academia (many academics were recruited into the civil service on a temporary basis). Examples include:

- The Experimental Bridging Establishment, Christchurch (later to become part of MEXE)
- The Experimental Demolition Establishment, Christchurch, from 1942 (later to become part of MEXE)
- The Experimental Tunnelling Establishment, Christchurch, from 1942
- The Fighting Vehicles Proving Establishment (FVPE), Chertsey
- The Projectile Development Establishment at Fort Halstead (moved to Aberporth, Cardiganshire, in 1940 where it remained until 1945)
- The Air Defence Research and Development Establishment (later renamed the Radar Research and Development Establishment) in Christchurch, then Malvern involved in the development of anti-aircraft radar
- The Wheeled Vehicle Experimental Establishment (WVEE), Farnborough 1942, then Chertsey from 1943

Moreover, the Dutch Defence Chemical Laboratory escaped the German occupation of the Netherlands. On 14 May 1940, archives and key personnel were moved to London. The 'Centraal Laboratorium, afdeling Londen' (Central Laboratory, London department) was established and fell under the supervision of the Dutch authorities on the one hand, and on the other hand under the Ministry of Supply, which provided housing and materials.

== Postwar Ministry of Supply ==
=== Expansion of scope ===
Following the Second World War, the postwar MoS was created on 1 April 1946 as a result of the amalgamation of the former Ministry of Supply and the Ministry of Aircraft Production. The functions and responsibilities of the new department remained basically the same as its predecessors.

=== Atomic weapons ===
Later in the same year, the MoS took over the responsibility for atomic weapons research. Lord Portal was appointed as Controller of Production (Atomic Energy); and in 1950 the High Explosive Research Establishment at Fort Halstead was renamed the Atomic Weapons Research Establishment (AWRE), with William Penney as its first director.

The atomic energy research function was relinquished in 1954 when the United Kingdom Atomic Energy Authority was set up, although the Ministry of Supply retained responsibility for the control of atomic weapons. The AWRE moved from Fort Halstead to Aldermaston in 1955.

=== Postwar research establishments ===
Immediately after the War, aviation research establishments joined the army ones under MoS control, and further new research establishments were developed during the Cold War era. Among the MoS research establishments (in addition to HERE and AWRE mentioned above) were :

- The Aeroplane and Armament Experimental Establishment (AAEE) at Boscombe Down from 1945
- The Clothing and Stores Trials Establishment (CSTE) was formed in 1948 at West Byfleet
- The Clothing and Equipment Physiological Research Establishment (CEPRE) was formed in 1948 at Farnborough
- The Clothing and Stores Experimental Establishment (CSEE) was formed in 1955 at West Byfleet by merging the CSTE and CEPRE
- The Explosives Research & Development Establishment (ERDE) was formed in 1945 at Waltham Abbey
- The Fighting Vehicle Research and Development Establishment (FVRDE) at Chertsey, formed in 1952 from the Wheeled Vehicle Experimental Establishment and the Fighting Vehicles Proving Establishment
- The Guided Projectile Establishment, formed in 1945 at Westcott (in 1946 becoming part of the RAE and renamed the Rocket Propulsion Establishment)
- The Marine Aircraft Experimental Establishment (MAEE) came under the Ministry of Supply after moving from Helensburgh to Felixstowe in 1945, and closed in 1956
- The Military Engineering Experimental Establishment (MEXE) at Christchurch, formed in 1946
- The Royal Aircraft Establishment (RAE) at Farnborough (and both RAE Bedford from 1946 and RAE Aberporth from 1947)
- The Services Electronics Research Laboratory (SERL) at Harlow and Baldock, formed in 1945
- The Signals Research and Development Establishment at Christchurch, formed in 1948
- The Telecommunications Research Establishment, which merged with the Radar Research and Development Establishment in 1953 to become the Radar Research Establishment, and from 1957 was renamed the Royal Radar Establishment

== Closure of the Ministry of Supply in 1959 by the Service Departments Supply Orders ==
The bill to abolish the Ministry of Supply was passed on 12 November 1959 at which time the Ministry of Aviation was created to look after both civilian and military aviation interests. Under the order the Ministry of Supply took over the aviation interests of the Ministry of Transport and Civil Aviation and was renamed the Ministry of Aviation, this enabling it to look after both civil and military aviation interests (across army, navy and RAF) as well as guided missiles, radar, nuclear weapons and munitions for aircraft. The bulk of other procurement functions, including cross-service procurement, were transferred out of the new Ministry of Aviation to the War Office. The Air Ministry regained procurement powers (except for aircraft) that had been transferred to the Ministry of Aircraft Production in 1940 and transferred to the Ministry of Supply in 1946. The procurement powers of the Admiralty were largely unaffected, though their aircraft would now be supplied via the Ministry of Aviation.

== See also ==
- Atomic Weapons Establishment
- Defence Research Establishments
- Filling factories in the United Kingdom
- List of Air Ministry specifications
- Minister of Supply
- Ministry of Supply Automatic Integrator and Computer (MOSAIC)
- Royal Ordnance Factory
  - List of Royal Ordnance Factories

== Bibliography ==
- Ashworth, William (1953). Contracts and Finance (History of the Second World War: United Kingdom Civil Series). London: Her Majesty's Stationery Office and Longmans, Green and Co.
- Arnold, Lorna (2001). Britain and the H-bomb. Basingstoke: Palgrave. ISBN 0-333-73685-0. (In the USA: ISBN 0-312-23518-6).
- Gowing, Margaret (1974). Independence and Deterrence: Britain and Atomic Energy, 1945–1952. Volume 1: Policy Making. London: The Macmillan Press. ISBN 0-333-15781-8.
- Gowing, Margaret (1974). Independence and Deterrence: Britain and Atomic Energy, 1945–1952. Volume 2: Policy Execution. London: The Macmillan Press. ISBN 0-333-16695-7.
- Hornby, William (1958). Factories and Plant: (History of the Second World War: United Kingdom Civil Series). London: Her Majesty's Stationery Office and Longmans, Green and Co.
- Inman, P (1957). Labour in the Munitions Industries: (History of the Second World War: United Kingdom Civil Series). London: Her Majesty's Stationery Office and Longmans, Green and Co.
- Robotham, William Arthur (1970). Silver Ghosts and Silver Dawn. London: Constable.
