= The Grangefield Academy =

Location
- Oxbridge Avenue; Grangefield, Stockton-on-Tees, TS18 4LE; England; 54°34′00″N 1°20′29″W

Information
- Type: Academy
- Established: 2014, founded 1896
- Department for Education URN: 139673 Tables
- Ofsted: Reports
- Chair: John Copping (Business Development Director of Amec Foster Wheeler)
- Principal: Kate Wright
- Staff: 82
- Gender: Coeducational
- Age: 11 to 16
- Enrolment: 1050
- Motto: Together, Beyond Expectations
- Website: /tga.northerneducationtrust.org

The Grangefield Academy is a secondary school with academy status in the borough of Stockton on Tees, on Oxbridge Avenue, Grangefield, Stockton-on-Tees, a market town in the ceremonial county of County Durham, North East England.

== History ==
The school dates back to 1896, originating as the Stockton Higher Grade School. However the current site is that of the former Grangefield Grammar Schools, which opened on 2 November 1951. Prior to this, from 1944, it was in different buildings as the Stockton Secondary Grammar School, and before that, from 1906, as Stockton Secondary School. The boys' and girls' lessons were taught separately, with separate heads of school.

In 1973 the grammar schools were merged into the comprehensive and co-educational The Grange Comprehensive School, which operated until 1985.

In 1985, another school merged in, and the combined entity was renamed Grangefield School. The merging school was Hardwick Secondary Modern School, founded in 1963, later known as Sheraton Comprehensive School. The new institution did not have a sixth form but was a co-educational comprehensive school of over 1000 students aged 11–16. It became a specialist Technology College from 1999 to 2013, during which period it was named Grangefield School and Technology College.

The school undertook formal consultation about plans to re-establish itself as an academy sponsored by Northern Education Trust, a Department for Education-approved charity, and the conversion to The Grangefield Academy was finalised in early 2014.

== Buildings and grounds ==
The Grangefield Academy has extensive school fields, adjacent to the town ring road and opposite the Stockton Cricket Club Ground.

In 2016 plans were completed to rebuild the school, with a new building with a large sports hall, activity studio, drama studio, main hall and dining hall.

The now-demolished attractive and substantial main buildings of the old Grammar Schools that stood on the site dated from the early 1950s. Comprising Grangefield Boys' and Grangefield Girls' Grammar Schools, the premises were connected to one another by a shared dining hall. The original brick, sandstone and Cumberland slate buildings faced out over the playing fields and were constructed around four well-planted quadrangles that provided a distinctive learning environment. The land will be used for a new car park, multi-use games area and school fields.

Before the transition to academy status many areas of the school were refurbished; an extension for the Design and Technology block was completed in 2005. Modern additions included a sports hall and library. The school field and grounds have 11 tennis courts, 2 football pitches, 2 rugby pitches, 2 hockey pitches and 2 artificial cricket wickets.

== Academic performance ==
The school fell to be in the lowest quintile amongst similar schools nationally, with, in 2012, only 40% of pupils attaining at least five GCSEs grade A* to C including English and mathematics. This was a decrease of 10 percentage points since 2011. Work to improve the grades and reputation of the school began, and by 2018, GCSE results were the best ever.

Following an Ofsted inspection in December 2012, the school was placed in "Special Measures" under the Education Act 2005 because it was failing to provide an acceptable standard of education and the persons responsible for leading, managing and governing the school were not demonstrating the capacity to secure the necessary improvements in the inadequate achievements of pupils, quality of teaching, standards of behaviour, and managerial leadership. Subsequently the school had visits from Her Majesty's Inspectorate, some of which have deemed that the school was making reasonable progress, but the final inspection in 2013 determined that the school was not making enough progress towards the removal of special measures.

After conversion to Academy status, the school continued to improve and, with "Special Measures" removed, in 2018 Grangefield Academy achieved "Good" status under all five major assessment headings.

== Notable former pupils ==
=== Stockton Secondary School ===
- William Arthur Bone, combustion engineer, and professor of chemical technology at Imperial College London from 1912–36
- Horace Maybray King, Baron Maybray-King, Labour MP for Southampton Test from 1950-5 and Southampton Itchen from 1955–71 and Speaker of the House of Commons from 1965–71
- Peter Smithson, architect
- Prof Keith Stewartson, Goldsmid Professor of Mathematics at University College London from 1964–83
- Barry Unsworth, novelist

=== Grangefield Grammar School ===
- Pat Barker CBE, author who wrote the historical novel Regeneration
- Hugh Cameron, cyclist
- James Gaddas, actor
- Charlie Gillett, musicologist, radio presenter and writer
- Kate Pyne, chief technical historian at the Atomic Weapons Establishment, Aldermaston, Berks
- Sir Ridley Scott, film director
- Tony Scott, film director
- Bruce Thomas, bassist in The Attractions
