= Charlie Gillett =

British radio presenter (1942–2010)

- Born: 20 February 1942; Morecambe, Lancashire, England, UK
- Died: 17 March 2010 (aged 68); London, England, UK
- Education: Peterhouse, Cambridge; Columbia University
- Occupations: Musicologist, writer, radio presenter, record producer
- Years active: 1972–2010
- Known for: Promotion of "world music"
- Notable work: The Sound of the City: The Rise of Rock and Roll (1970)
- Website: Charlie Gillett website

Charles Thomas Gillett (/ˈɡɪlɪt/; 20 February 1942 – 17 March 2010) was a British radio presenter, musicologist, and writer, mainly on rock and roll and other forms of popular music. He was particularly noted for his influential book The Sound of the City, for his promotion of many forms of "world music", and for discovering and promoting such acts as Dire Straits and Ian Dury.

== Biography ==
Gillett was born in Morecambe, Lancashire, England, and was brought up in Stockton-on-Tees, where he attended Grangefield Grammar School. As a teenager, he developed a love of music, as well as sport, before going to Peterhouse, Cambridge, to take a degree in economics. In 1965, after graduating and marrying, he went to Columbia University in New York City to study for a master's degree, taking as his thesis — unconventionally for the time — the history of rock and roll music.

After he returned to England in 1966, he taught social studies and film-making at Kingsway College of Further Education in central London, while starting to turn his thesis into a book. He began in journalism in 1968 with a weekly column in the Record Mirror. His 1970 book, The Sound of the City: The Rise of Rock and Roll, was developed from his master's thesis, and was a seminal history of popular music. It received excellent reviews in both Time and The New York Times and enabled Gillett to further his music journalism career and to write a second book, Making Tracks.

He wrote for a variety of music magazines, including Rolling Stone, Let It Rock, and New Musical Express and contributed to The Observer. Writer Richie Unterberger said of The Sound of the City that it "was the first serious and comprehensive history of rock and roll, and remains one of the best."

Gillett began a weekly radio programme, Honky Tonk, on Radio London in 1972, leaving in 1978. He brought Ian Dury to public attention, and was the first DJ to play demos by Graham Parker, Elvis Costello, and Dire Straits ("Sultans of Swing"). In the latter case, significant numbers of London's A&R men had contacted Gillett's studio by the time he had finished playing the song — sending Dire Straits on their journey to global stardom.

His second book, Making Tracks: Atlantic Records and the Making of a Multi-billion-dollar Industry, was published in 1974. The same year, with partner Gordon Nelki, Gillett launched the Oval record label with Another Saturday Night, a compilation album, which popularised Cajun music in the UK. The duo managed Ian Dury's first group Kilburn and the High Roads and published Paul Hardcastle's worldwide number-one hit, "19".

In 1980, Gillett joined Capital Radio, and began to play more independent music. He was fired in 1983, but after listener complaints was rehired with orders for a new format. He chose to follow his new interest in music from the rest of the world and his show, A Foreign Affair, is credited with helping to launch "world music". Having been the first British DJ to play Youssou N'Dour, Salif Keita, "Hot Hot Hot" by Arrow (Alphonsus Cassell) and many more, he left Capital in December 1990. He was presented with the Sony Gold Lifetime Achievement Award the following year.

While at Capital, Gillett also co-presented The Late Shift, a weekly late-night strand of music concerts and films for Channel 4 in 1988, alongside Vivien Goldman.

Returning to the BBC, Gillett presented a weekly two-hour show on BBC London 94.9 from 1995 to 2006 and a weekly world music programme on the BBC World Service from 1999. In 2006, Gillett was awarded the John Peel Award for Outstanding Contribution to Music Radio by the Radio Academy. In July 2006, after 11 years of broadcasting his regular Saturday-night show of world music, Gillett had to end his weekend slot due to ill health, but until his death, he continued to present his half-hour show, Charlie Gillett's World of Music, on Friday evenings. From mid-2007, he was on BBC Radio 3 in a rotation of three music presenters (with Mary Ann Kennedy and Lopa Kothari) presenting World on 3, regularly featuring session guests. In 1996, his revised and expanded version of The Sound of the City was published.

Every year from 2000 to 2009, he compiled a world music double album, World 2000, World 2001, etc., the first four of them for EMI, the next two for Wrasse, and the last four, World 2006, Sound of the World (2007), Beyond the Horizon (2008), and Otro Mundo (2009), for Warner Classics and Jazz/Rhino. In 2009, he also released Charlie Gillett's Radio Picks "Honky Tonk" (Ace Records), a compilation of tracks from his show. Anywhere on This Road was posthumously released on Warner Classics and Jazz.

== Death and family ==
Gillett died on 17 March 2010, following a series of health problems, including being diagnosed with eosinophilic granulomatosis with polyangiitis in 2006. Gillett and his wife Buffy (née Chessum) had two daughters and one son.

WOMAD (World Of Music And Dance) renamed one of its festival stages in memory of Gillett in 2010. The stage was dedicated by Peter Gabriel.

== Bibliography ==
- The Sound of the City: The Rise of Rock and Roll (1970, several later editions)
- Rock File nos. 1–4 (ed., with Simon Frith) (1972–76)
- Making Tracks: Atlantic Records and the Making of a Multi-billion-dollar Industry (1974)
