= Margaret Gowing =

English historian (1921–1998)

Margaret Gowing CBE, FBA, FRS
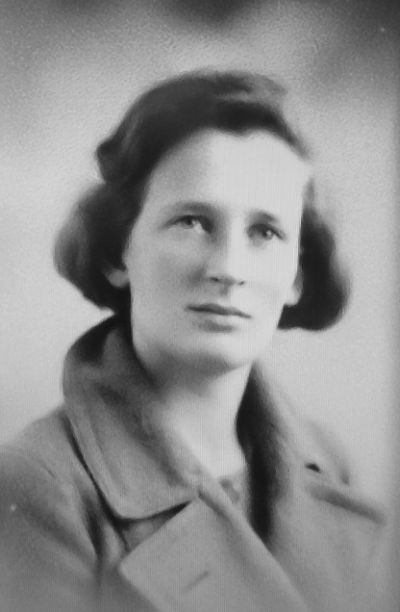
- Gowing as a student at LSE
- Born: Margaret Mary Elliott; 26 April 1921; Kensington, London, England
- Died: 7 November 1998 (aged 77); Kingston upon Thames, London, England
- Known for: History of the UK nuclear weapons programme
- Awards: Fellow of the Royal Society (1988); Commander of the Order of the British Empire (1981)
- Scientific career
- Fields: Historian of Science
- Workplaces: Ministry of Supply; Cabinet Office; United Kingdom Atomic Energy Authority; University of Kent; University of Oxford – Linacre College

Margaret Mary Gowing (née Elliott), CBE, FBA, FRS (26 April 1921 – 7 November 1998) was an English historian. She was involved with the production of several volumes of the officially sponsored History of the Second World War, but was better known for her books, commissioned by the United Kingdom Atomic Energy Authority, covering the early history of Britain's nuclear weapons programmes: Britain and Atomic Energy 1939–1945, published in 1964, and the two-volume Independence and Deterrence: Britain and Atomic Energy 1945–52, published in 1974.

Through her work in the Cabinet Office from 1945 to 1959, she knew personally many of the people involved. As historian archivist at the UK Atomic Energy Authority from 1959 to 1966 she had access to the official papers and files of the British nuclear weapons programmes. She was the first occupant of a chair in the history of science at the University of Oxford, which she held from 1972 until her retirement in 1986. As co-founder with physicist Nicholas Kurti of the Contemporary Scientific Archives Centre in Oxford, she helped ensure the preservation of contemporary scientific manuscripts.

== Early life ==
Margaret Elliott was born on 26 April 1921 in Kensington, London, the youngest of three children of Ronald Elliott, a motor engineer, and his wife, Mabel née Donaldson, a school teacher. She had an older sister, Audrey, and an older brother, Donald. The family was poor; her father suffered, and ultimately died, from tuberculosis and was frequently unemployed, while her mother was barred from working as a school teacher after she was married. The family therefore often had to live on a weekly sickness benefit. For entertainment, they took advantage of free entry to art galleries, museums and libraries. Elliot's direct experience of poverty led to her becoming an ardent socialist later in life. She attended Portobello Elementary School in North Kensington, and won a London County Council scholarship to Christ's Hospital in 1932. She excelled academically, was a prefect, and played hockey for her house.

Elliott completed her School Certificate in 1936, earning distinctions in Latin, English and French and a pass in German. She won a Leverhulme Entry Scholarship to the London School of Economics (LSE), which she entered in 1938. Her first-year studies advisor was the economist Vera Anstey, who considered that Elliott had "a decided bent for economic history"; Elliot later attributed her interest in the subject to lectures by her second-year studies advisor, Eileen Power, who urged her to pursue an academic career. She won both the Gladstone Memorial Prize and the Lillian Knowles Scholarship for economic history in 1939. Later that year, with the outbreak of the Second World War, the LSE was evacuated to Oxford, where Elliott graduated in 1941 with a BSc degree in economics with first-class honours.

== Civil Service ==
Academic jobs in history were not easy to find in 1941, so Elliott joined the Civil Service, working in the Prices and Statistics Section of the Iron and Steel Control directorate in the Ministry of Supply. She subsequently moved to the Board of Trade, and the Directorate of Housing Fitments, where she rose to the rank of Assistant Principal, before moving to the Cabinet Office in 1945. There she became involved with the Official History of the Second World War, as assistant to Keith Hancock who was overall editor of the United Kingdom Civil Series of books within the Official History. As an official historian of the History of the Second World War: United Kingdom Civil Series, Gowing had access to unpublished official papers and files. She came to know personally many of the politicians and senior civil servants involved.

On 7 June 1944, Elliot married Donald James Graham Gowing at the Wimbledon Registry Office. He was a vocalist who had also attended Christ's Hospital before winning a choral scholarship to King's College, Cambridge, in 1939. He had joined the Royal Naval Volunteer Reserve in 1941, and was serving at Combined Operations Headquarters. They married shortly before he was shipped overseas. He was taught Japanese in the United States and went on serve in the Pacific as a translator. The marriage bar was suspended for the duration and Gowing was allowed to remain in the Civil Service. They had two children, both sons: Nicholas Keith (Nik), a journalist who was born in 1951 and named after Hancock, and James, born in 1954. Her husband, frustrated by his lack of professional success compared to hers, became an alcoholic, and died from a massive stroke in 1969.

In 1950, Sir Norman Brook attempted to have Gowing retained in the Cabinet Office as the permanent historian, but was stymied by the Treasury and the Civil Service Commission. In 1951, she was told that she had no chance of being appointed to the grade of Principal, which would have carried retirement benefits with it. She later said that her years at the Cabinet Office were the happiest of her life, but she began looking for another position. In 1955, she applied for a chair in economic history at Oxford, and for a position as a reader at LSE, but was unsuccessful. Sir Norman exploited various administrative loopholes to allow her to be retained at the Cabinet Office, and was prepared to make her the Cabinet Office Archivist, but he could not offer her a pension.

The Public Records Act 1958 required all government departments to set up archives and records management systems. The United Kingdom Atomic Energy Authority (UKAEA) was nominally exempt from the act, being a government corporation rather than a department, but voluntarily asked to be included under the Act. This created a position at the UKAEA for an historian and archivist. Gowing applied for and secured the job in 1959. This involved organising systems and criteria for the selection for preservation of scientific, engineering and administrative records, and writing the history of the British atomic project since it had begun in 1939, the UKAEA having inherited the files of predecessor organisations including the Tube Alloys Directorate.

By this time, the UKAEA employed some 40,000 people in offices, laboratories and factories scattered around Britain. Gowing knew little about atomic energy; she once remarked that when she was appointed, she "didn't know an atom from a molecule". This was rectified, and she won the respect of Sir Christopher Hinton and Sir James Chadwick, and became friends with Nicholas Kurti, Sir Rudolf Peierls and Niels Bohr. At one point she asked Chadwick what he intended to do with all the documents in wooden filing cabinets in his attic, and he just said "burn them". Such heart-stopping moments led her to help establish the Centre for Scientific Archives in 1972.

Gowing's first volume, Britain and Atomic Energy 1939–1945, was published in 1964, and achieved widespread acclaim. Stephen Toulmin declared that "No better example of contemporary narrative history of science has yet appeared". It prompted Mark Oliphant to seek the appointment of a historian to the Australian Academy of Science in Canberra, and the Cabinet Office to commission a new series of peacetime official histories in 1966.

== Academia ==
In 1966, Gowing became Reader in Contemporary History at the new University of Kent, Canterbury, covering scientific, technical, economic and social history. The UKAEA retained her as a consultant, paying her £1,000 per annum for three years. Her main task was to write a two-volume sequel to Britain and Atomic Energy 1939–1945 covering the period from 1945 to 1952. To help out, the UKAEA brought in Lorna Arnold from its Health and Safety Division in 1967 to become the Departmental Records Officer (DRO) and Gowing's Assistant Historian. Despite their being accredited as official historians, the Atomic Weapons Establishment would not let them take their notes away, so they had to do their writing on site, under the watchful eye of Aldermaston's DRO. To get there Gowing had to catch the train each day from Canterbury to London Waterloo station, and then the Tube to Paddington and the railway to Reading, where Arnold picked Gowing up in her car and drove to Harwell.

Gowing attempted to negotiate better conditions at the University of Kent that would allow more time to work on the books, but this was denied. She applied for a vacant chair in the History and Philosophy of Science at University College London in 1970, without success. Then, in February 1972, Sir Rudolf Peierls and Nicholas Kurti informed her that the University of Oxford had created a new chair in the history of science, the first of its kind in the university's long history. She did not expect to get the chair, but Peierls, Sir Frederick Dainton and Hugh Trevor-Roper were on the selection panel, and in the end offered the chair in the history of science to Gowing, a woman who did not have a degree in history or science.

Gowing was based at Linacre College. Her appointment, Roy MacLeod wrote, "struck a conspicuous blow for modern, as against medieval and early modern, science, and for a reading of history that favoured social, economic and political perspectives, as against the examination of scientific practice." She delivered her inaugural lecture, What's Science to History or History to Science?, on 27 May 1975. In this lecture, she examined the reasons why the history of science had grown apart from other forms of history, and endeavoured to reconcile them and bring them together again. In her subsequent Wilkins Lecture in 1976 she examined the history of British prejudice against science dating back to Victorian times.

The two-volume opus, Independence and Deterrence: Britain and Atomic Energy 1945–52, finally appeared in 1974. The publication of her books brought accolades. Gowing was elected a Fellow of the British Academy in 1975, and was made a Commander of the Order of the British Empire (CBE) in the 1981 Birthday Honours. She received honorary doctorates in literature from the University of Leeds in 1976, the University of Leicester in 1982, and Manchester in 1985, and in science from the University of Bath in 1987. When she was elected a Fellow of the Royal Society in 1988 under the provisions of Statute 12 of its Charter, which allowed for the election of non-scientists who had made distinguished contributions to science, she became only the third person to become a Fellow of both the British Academy and the Royal Society, after Sir Karl Popper and Joseph Needham. Gowing never got around to writing a planned sequel to Independence and Deterrence that would take the story up 1958, when the nuclear Special Relationship between Britain and the United States resumed. Arnold would later write three books to fill in this gap.

In the 1980s, Gowing served as a trustee of the Science Museum, London, and the Imperial War Museum but, remembering her own childhood, she resigned from the latter in protest at the introduction of entry fees. She was also a trustee of the National Portrait Gallery from 1978 to 1992. She began suffering from what was most likely Alzheimer's disease, and retired from Oxford in 1986, two years before the official retirement age. Although she had worked in the Civil Service and Academia for 45 years, only 27 of them counted, so she was not eligible for a full pension; her son Nik supported her. She died at Kingston Hospital in Kingston upon Thames on 7 November 1998. An archive of her papers is held by the Museum of the History of Science in Oxford, presented by her in 1991, with additions on her death.

== Published works ==
=== History of the Second World War: United Kingdom Civil Series ===
- British War Economy (with W.K. Hancock; 1952). London: Her Majesty's Stationery Office/Longman's, Green and Co.
- Civil Industry and Trade (with Eric L. Hargreaves; 1952). London: Her Majesty's Stationery Office/Longman's, Green & Co.

=== British nuclear weapons programmes ===
- Britain and Atomic Energy, 1939–1945 (1964) London: Macmillan Publishing.
- Independence and Deterrence: Britain and Atomic Energy, 1945–52. Volume 1: Policy Making (assisted by Lorna Arnold). (1974). London: Macmillan Publishing, ISBN 0-333-15781-8.
- Independence and Deterrence: Britain and Atomic Energy, 1945–52. Volume 2: Policy Execution (assisted by Lorna Arnold). (1974). London: Macmillan Publishing, ISBN 0-333-16695-7.
