= Edward G. Brisch =

Edward Gustave Brisch (8 January 1901 – 9 April 1960) was a Polish consulting engineer and industrial coding expert. He was the designer of the Brisch Classification, widely known and used in building and engineering. He became a British citizen in the 1940s.

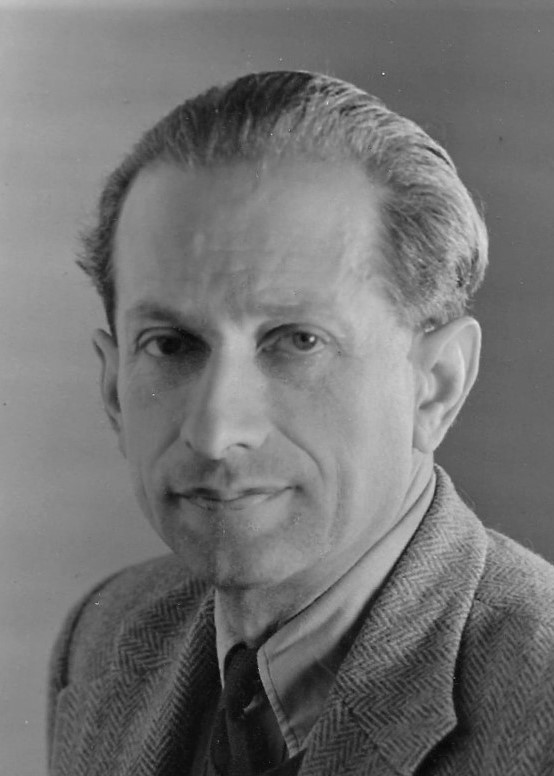
Edward G Brisch photographed in the 1940s (studio unknown)

== Biography ==
Born in Łódź, Poland, the son of Leopold (1858–1927) and Zofia (1866–1941) Brisch, he attended Nicolaus Copernicus High School No. 1 before going on to gain an Intermediate B.Sc. (Engineering) at the Technical University of Warsaw, then a diploma in Mechanical Engineering at the University of Toulouse. He returned to Warsaw, where from 1926 to 1929 he was Assistant Chief Designer at the Ursus tractor factory, and was then appointed Works Manager of Citroën's Warsaw branch. He remained there until 1932 before taking on the role of Engineer in charge of Development of National Production at the Polish State Engineering Works (PZInż), specializing in armoured vehicles. By now married, in 1934 he established an engineering consultancy in Warsaw, transferring soon afterwards to Paris, where he did some work for the British Army's armoured vehicle operations.

Returning to Poland in summer 1939 to visit his family, trapped there by the German invasion, he escaped to Riga in Latvia, but Latvia was to be occupied by the Soviet Union in 1940. Unable to return to Paris, Brisch was urged by the British War Office and Vickers Ltd to come to England, but that journey proved extremely difficult. Sir Stafford Cripps, then British Ambassador in Moscow, helped to arrange his land and air journey from Riga to Rangoon in British Burma. He left Riga in June 1941, scarcely a month before the German occupation, reaching Rangoon (by way of Chungking, wartime capital of China) in August 1941. Burma, in turn, was soon to be conquered by Japan, but he was able to continue his journey via Bombay in British India to Liverpool, a total of some 25,000 miles (40,000 km). Cripps' intervention had probably saved his life. He kept a record in Polish of this long and hazardous journey, of which the first seven pages have survived. They can now be read online in English translation.

He arrived in England with a lung ailment, contracted in Burma, and underwent an immediate pneumonectomy, but this left him prone to infections for the rest of his life. In late 1942 he joined the Department of Tank Design of the Ministry of Supply, and worked also during the war years for the War Office school of technology. His first wife having died in the Warsaw Ghetto, he married his British nurse, Susan Rogers (1920–2018), in 1947. In the same year he founded in London a firm of consultants, E. G. Brisch and Partners. R. S. Geoghegan, with whom he had worked at the Department of Tank Design, was to join him in 1953. This was the most fruitful period of Brisch's life: his business activities extended to other countries in Europe and beyond. He established an American branch, first in Cleveland (1956) and later in Toledo, Ohio. The American firm had among its early clients the Owens-Illinois Glass Company, the Libbey-Owens-Ford Glass Company, General Electric in Cleveland and the Underwood Company of New York.

In 1957, Brisch moved his family from Oxshott in Surrey to settle in Toledo. Never robust following his lung surgery, he died of pneumonia in Toledo on 9 April 1960. His widow and three children moved back to Surrey in the same year.

== The Brisch Classification ==
Brisch was a member of numerous British and American technical and management societies and a fellow of the Royal Society of Arts. He wrote several technical papers in his field.

His great innovation was the development of a flexible machine-card inventory classification system, which was adopted by major companies in the US and Europe. His work drew some inspiration from the Universal Decimal Classification, used for classifying documents. The uniqueness of the idea lies in the nomination of a primary code (typically within nine main headings 00–80) attached to every 'part', based on its essential features (shape and dimension). A further, secondary, code (based on 81 two-digit numbers, representing concepts, which are divided, and can be used in any conjunction) is then bonded to the parent, determined by its process features (e.g. machining operation). Evolving with the advances of computing and digitisation, the system has spread roots in contemporary situations requiring complicated inventory management.

The system had wide applicability. In 1955 Brisch published a paper on his classification in the newly established journal of the Association of Special Libraries and Information Bureaux, ASLIB Proceedings. Sir Frank Francis, director and principal librarian at the British Museum, in the brief memoir that he contributed to The Times at Brisch's death, recalled frequent discussions on "expanding the methods [Brisch] had successfully developed for industry to the classification of documents and books. In the course of these discussions he elaborated a classification for music designed to make possible precise reference to documents illustrating many different aspects of a particular subject."

== Publications ==
- 1948 : "Adaptation of the U.D.C. Form of Notation to Punched Card Techniques" in Royal Society Scientific Information Conference Report, 690–692.
- 1951 : "Standardization without tears" in The Manager vol. 19 (9), September, 496–497.
- 1953 : "Standardization practice" in Engineering Inspection, September, 59–66.
- 1954 : "A new dragon for St. George" in Institution of Production Engineers Journal vol. 33 (3), March, 143–145.
- 1954 : "Maximum ex minimo" in Institution of Production Engineers Journal vol. 33 (6), June, 344–351.
- 1955 : "Subject analysis in eighty-one concepts" in ASLIB Proceedings vol. 1 (3), 157–162.
- 1956 : "Production classification methods" in H. B. Maynard (ed.), Industrial Engineering Handbook (New York, McGraw Hill) 6 and 195–207
- 1957 (with R. S. Geoghegan) : "Simplification and standardisation for automation. Discussion Group B 4 (Proceedings of Conference on Automatic Production – Change and Control, Harrogate, June 30-July 3, 1957)" in Institution of Production Engineers Journal vol. 36 (9), September, 571–582
