= Dickie Davis (cricketer) =

English cricketer (1966–2003)

Personal information
- Full name: Richard Peter Davis
- Born: 18 March 1966; Westbrook, Kent, England
- Died: 29 December 2003 (aged 37); Blean, Kent, England
- Nickname: Dickie
- Height: 6 ft 4 in (1.93 m)
- Batting: Right-handed
- Bowling: Slow left-arm orthodox
- Relatives: David Fulton (brother-in-law)

Domestic team information
- Years: Team
- 1986–1993: Kent
- 1994–1995: Warwickshire
- 1996–1997: Gloucestershire
- 1998: Sussex
- 2001: Leicestershire
- 2001: Berkshire

Career statistics
Competition	First-class	List A
Matches	170	145
Runs scored	2,503	457
Batting average	15.26	10.15
100s/50s	0/5	0/1
Top score	67	56
Balls bowled	31,250	6,157
Wickets	421	141
Bowling average	34.92	32.04
5 wickets in innings	17	1
10 wickets in match	2	0
Best bowling	7/64	5/52
Catches/stumpings	157/–	56/–
- Source: Cricinfo, 7 October 2010

Richard Peter Davis (18 March 1966 – 29 December 2003) was an English cricketer. Davis was a right-handed batsman, who bowled slow left-arm orthodox. He was born at Westbrook, Kent.

== Early life and Kent ==
Davis grew up in East Kent and was educated firstly at King Ethelbert School in Birchington-on-Sea and later at Thanet Technical College on the Isle of Thanet. He was coached at county level throughout his life, eventually making his first-class cricket debut for Kent in 1986 against Warwickshire. Despite making his first-class debut for the county at the age of just 20, Davis faced a challenge to remain within the team; he was expected to succeed Derek Underwood, one of the finest left-arm spinners. This following the most successful period in the history of the county and with pitches at Canterbury which were not conducive to slow bowling.

Nonetheless, between 1986 and 1993, he represented Kent in 125 first-class matches with his final appearance for the county coming against the touring Australians. Despite the nature of the pitches at Canterbury, Davis was a successful bowler for the county. In 125 matches, he took 320 wickets at a bowling average of 35.02, with 13 five-wicket hauls and 2 ten wicket hauls. His best bowling figures were 7/64, which came in 1992, his best with the ball. During the 1992 season, he took 74 wickets at an average of 21.74, with those best figures coming against Durham at Eastwood Gardens. Up to this time, he had also developed into a handy lower order batsman for the county. In his 125 matches, he scored 1,795 runs at a batting average of 15.74, with 4 half centuries and a high score of 67 which came against Hampshire in the 1989 County Championship. Davis also made his debut in List-A cricket for Kent against Worcestershire. A tidy bowler with a good economy rate, Davis played 106 List-A matches for the county, during which time he took 103 wickets an average of 31.71, which included his only List-A five wicket haul of 5/52 against Somerset. At the end of the 1993 season, the emergence of Min Patel led Davis not to extend his Kent contract.

== Moves to Warwickshire and Gloucestershire ==
Leaving Kent, Davis moved to Warwickshire who at the time were coached by Bob Woolmer. Woolmer believed Davis could improve as a cricketer if he had more self-belief, even believing he had it in him to represent England at a time when spin bowling was a declining art. He made his first-class debut for the county against Mashonaland during Warwickshire's pre-season tour to Zimbabwe. From 1994 to 1995, he represented Warwickshire in 20 first-class matches and 12 List-A matches. In 20 first-class matches, he took 54 wickets at an average of 31.01, with 3 five wicket hauls and best figures of 6/94. In his 12 List-A matches, he took 13 wickets at an average of 22.23, with best figures of 3/19. In his first season with Warwickshire, he tasted instant success as the team went on to win Warwickshire's first county cricket's first treble – Championship, Benson and Hedges Cup and AXA Equity & Law League. Held in high regard by Woolmer, then Warwickshire captain Dermot Reeve did not share Woolmer's high regard of Davis and with the emergence of the young Ashley Giles, Davis left Warwickshire at the end of the 1995 season. While at the county, Woolmer had also encouraged Davis to take up coaching later in his career, calling him a "deep thinker".

Joining Gloucestershire in 1996, he made his first-class debut for the county against Middlesex at Lord's. Between 1996 and 1997, he represented Gloucestershire in 24 first-class matches, the last of which came against Lancashire. He also played 20 List-A matches for the county, the last of which came against Kent. In his 24 first-class matches for Gloucestershire he took 40 wickets at an average of 41.50, with best figures of 4/35. In his 20 List-A matches for the county he took 20 wickets at an average of 37.30, with best figures of 3/42. After two seasons at Bristol he left to join Sussex.

== Sussex and retirement ==
Joining Sussex for the 1998 season, he represented the county exclusively in List-A cricket. During that season he played 4 List-A matches for the county in the AXA League and Benson and Hedges Cup against Lancashire, Middlesex and Essex twice. During his 4 match stint with the county, he took just a single wicket at a cost of 118.00, in what ultimately proved to be an unsuccessful spell. With this came his retirement from cricket at the end of 1998 season. In the following years he took up numerous coaching positions, with a successful career as a coach seemingly beckoning. During this time he became the cricket development officer for Greater London.

== Berkshire and Leicestershire ==
In 2001, Davis came out of retirement to play as the player-coach for Berkshire. His debut in the Minor Counties Championship for the county came against Shropshire. During the 2001 season, he represented the county in 6 Minor Counties Championship matches, the last of which came against Dorset. He also made his debut in the MCCA Knockout Trophy for the county against Dorset. He represented Berkshire in 4 Trophy matches, the last of which came against the Channel Islands. Davis also represented Berkshire in List-A matches, the first of which came when Berkshire played the Middlesex Cricket Board and Essex in the 2001 Cheltenham & Gloucester Trophy. His final List-A match for Berkshire and in his career, came against Lincolnshire in the 1st round of the 2002 Cheltenham & Gloucester Trophy which was played in 2001. It was in this match that he scored his maiden and only List-A half century, with a score of 56.

2001 saw one of the most extraordinary chapters of his career, when on a coaching course in Northampton he was asked by Leicestershire to play a one-off County Championship match; this was due to Leicestershire's injury crisis at the time. Making a single appearance against Northamptonshire, he scored his final first-class half century, by making 51 runs, before being dismissed by Monty Panesar. To expand his fairy tale end of his first-class career, he took figures of 6/73; his wickets included those of Graeme Swann and Michael Hussey.

== Career summary ==
"...unflashy, good in a crisis, a brilliant pair of hands, and a much better batsman than might have been obvious – he was the best hooker we had."

— Matthew Fleming describing Davis after his death.

Davis was considered an able batsman, in his entire first-class career he scored 2,503 runs at an average of 15.26, with 5 half centuries and a high score of 67. A spinner who often did not get too much spin on a cricket ball, Davis was notable for his ability to bowl accurately and to tie up and end. As such he was a bowler whose style was more to defend the run rate than to actively seek to dismiss the batsman. Though, with the ball he took 421 wickets at an average of 34.92, with 17 five wicket hauls and 2 ten wicket hauls in a match, his best figures were 7/64. An able slip fielder, he took 157 catches. In his 145 List-A matches, he scored 457 runs at an average of 10.15, with a single half century high score of 56. With the ball he took 141 wickets at an average of 32.04, a single five wicket haul of 5/52. In the field he took 57 catches in one-day cricket.

Something of a journeyman, Davis was the first cricketer to have represented five different first-class counties.

== Death ==
Two weeks after playing for Leicestershire and while acting as assistant coach of the England women's cricket team, Davis suffered a seizure. The cause of this seizure was discovered to be a low-grade brain tumour. During that season's winter, he underwent radiotherapy and chemotherapy while still coaching Kent Women and England Women. With the treatment having little success in fighting the cancer, he underwent surgery in 2002, but his health continued to deteriorate. In 2003, while attending a match at Canterbury he was awarded a numbered county cap by his former club. Ten days before his death, his wife's sister married the then Kent captain David Fulton. Davis died at Blean in Kent on 29 December 2003. He was buried in his Kent blazer.
