= Britain, Australia and the Bomb =

2006 book by Lorna Arnold and Mark Smith

- Author: Lorna Arnold; Mark Smith
- Publisher: Palgrave Macmillan
- Publication date: 2006
- Pages: 322 pages
- ISBN: 978-1-4039-2101-7
- OCLC: 76350829
- Dewey Decimal: 355.8

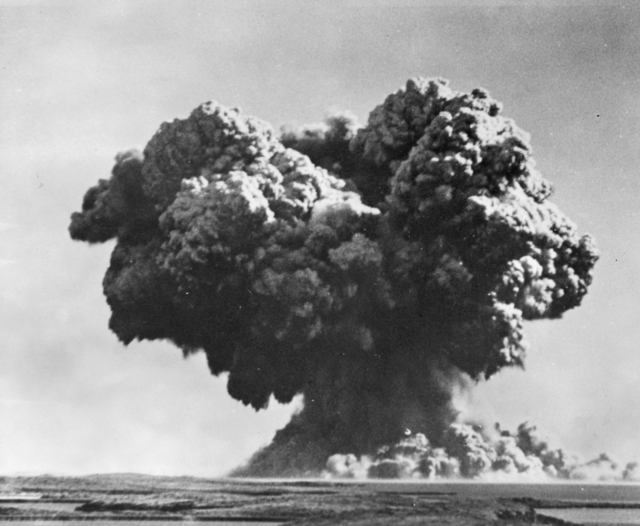
The mushroom cloud resulting from the Operation Hurricane detonation at the Montebello Islands.

Britain, Australia and the Bomb: the Nuclear Tests and Their Aftermath is a 2006 book by Lorna Arnold and Mark Smith. It was first published in 1987 as A Very Special Relationship: British Atomic Weapons Trials in Australia.

Lorna Arnold was a Fellow of both the Institute of Physics and Institute of Contemporary British History. Mark Smith is a Research Fellow at the Mountbatten Centre for International Studies, University of Southampton.

== See also ==
- Nuclear tests in Australia
- Maralinga: Australia's Nuclear Waste Cover-up
- McClelland Royal Commission
