= David Fulton (English cricketer) =

English cricketer (born 1971)

Personal information
- Full name: David Paul Fulton
- Born: 15 November 1971 (age 54); Lewisham, Greater London
- Height: 6 ft 2 in (1.88 m)
- Batting: Right-handed
- Bowling: Slow left-arm orthodox
- Role: Batsman
- Relatives: Richard Davis (brother-in-law)

Domestic team information
- Years: Team
- 1992–2006: Kent

Career statistics
Competition	FC	LA	T20
Matches	200	108	5
Runs scored	12,125	1,962	40
Batting average	36.52	20.87	20.00
100s/50s	28/53	0/7	0/0
Top score	208*	82	15
Balls bowled	193	6	0
Wickets	1	0	–
Bowling average	120.00	–	–
5 wickets in innings	0	–	–
10 wickets in match	0	–	–
Best bowling	1/37	–	–
Catches/stumpings	266/–	46/–	1/–
- Source: CricInfo, 25 May 2008

David Paul Fulton (born 15 November 1971) is a former English professional cricketer who played for 15 seasons for Kent County Cricket Club. He played as a right-handed opening batsman who occasionally bowled left-arm orthodox spin. Since retiring from first-class cricket in 2006 he has been a cricket journalist with The Times and Sky Sports. Fulton was born in Lewisham in Greater London in 1971.

== Early career ==
Having been educated at The Judd School in Tonbridge and the University of Kent, Fulton joined Kent in 1992. His first-class debut came at Fenner's, where he scored 16 and 42 in the match against Cambridge University. Later that year he appeared in the University Championship final for the University of Kent, where he contributed 10 runs in the defeat to the University of Durham.

Once established in the first-team, Fulton performed consistently in the seasons between 1995 and 1998, where he averaged over 30 every year. In 1995 Fulton stood in as opening batsman in place of Mark Benson in the final of the Benson and Hedges Cup which Kent lost to Lancashire, Christopher Martin-Jenkins reporting that "Fulton had an outstanding day in the field, [and] launched the innings with confidence and style - in a sunhat, not a helmet", and helped Kent to win the Sunday League. 1996 also saw Fulton take his only first-class wicket; that of Oxford University batsman William Kendall, caught and bowled. Fulton's best run-scoring return was 954 runs in 1998, a season in which he hit his first double century. Playing against Yorkshire at Mote Park, Maidstone, Fulton posted 207 not out over the course of ten-and-a-half hours to save Kent from a heavy defeat. However, his innings was criticised by some, notably Clive Ellis of The Daily Telegraph, of being so slow that it prevented Kent from reaching a position to set a target.

His run-scoring returns declined in 1999 and 2000, whilst his average slipped into the mid-twenties. However, 2001 proved a much more productive year. In eighteen first-class matches, Fulton scored a total of 1892 runs, at an average of 75.68. His form over the season was noticed by the national selectors, who according to Nasser Hussain, originally selected him in place of Mark Butcher for the fourth Test against Australia, before having a change of heart and reinstating Butcher. Nonetheless, Fulton was named Player of the Year by the Professional Cricketers' Association at the end of the season.

== Captaincy and later career ==
The 2002 season saw Fulton share the captaincy with Matthew Fleming, with Fulton leading the side in first-class cricket and Fleming leading in one-day matches. The captaincy did not affect his batting, as he scored 1358 runs, his second thousand-run season in succession. The Australian captain Steve Waugh, in his brief spell as overseas player for Kent, remarked that he could be "a future England captain"

Whilst preparing for the 2003 season, Fulton was hit in the eye by a ball from a bowling machine, whilst practising the pull shot. The injury ruled him out for the first eight weeks of the season, and Fulton admitted upon standing down from the captaincy three seasons later that his eye was still troubling him. Despite this, he still managed to score over 600 runs in eleven matches. He consistently scored runs for the next three seasons, whilst helping Kent challenge for first-class honours. 2004 saw Kent finish second to Warwickshire, and his side also challenged for the 2005 title.

He stepped down from the one-day captaincy after being dropped, ahead of Kent's C&G Trophy quarter-final against Warwickshire in 2005. Handing the one-day captaincy to Matthew Walker, he continued as first-class captain until the end of the season, where a run-chase agreement led to him being criticised by other county captains. In an attempt to keep his side's Championship hopes alive, he agreed to chase a target of 420 in 70 overs with Nottinghamshire captain Stephen Fleming; Kent managed only to reach 210. The win for Nottinghamshire secured them the Championship. Shane Warne, the Hampshire captain whose side were also in the running for the title, described the agreement as "one of the dumbest things I have ever seen." Fulton stood down as captain a week later.

Fulton was awarded a benefit year in 2006, with proceeds totalling £105,000, half of which was given to charity. He retired at the end of the season, having scored 155 in his final first-class innings; against Middlesex. Owing to club captain Rob Key being rested and stand-in captain Martin van Jaarsveld being in hospital, Fulton led the side on to the field during the final session as acting captain.

Fulton published an analysis of captaincy in recent Ashes cricket in 2009, to which Shane Warne, in spite of their earlier disagreements, contributed a foreword.

Sporting positions
Preceded by Matthew Fleming	Kent County Cricket Club captain 2002–2005	Succeeded by Rob Key
