= Westbrook, Kent =

Seaside town in Kent, England

Coordinates: 51.384°N 1.355°E

Westbrook
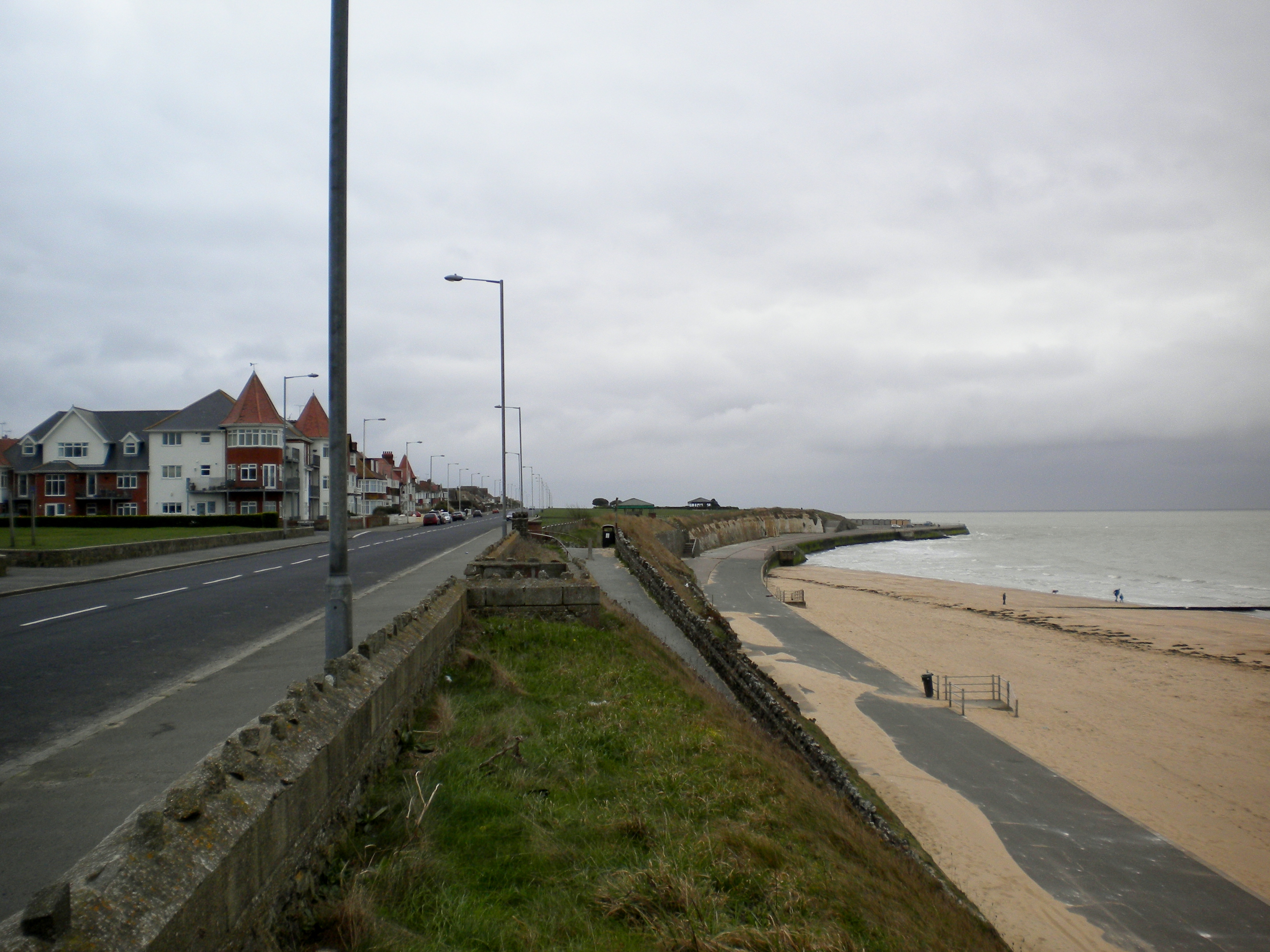
- Royal Esplanade

- Location within Kent
- Population: 4,126 (2011)
- District: Thanet
- Shire county: Kent
- Region: South East
- Country: England
- Sovereign state: United Kingdom
- Post town: Margate
- Postcode district: CT9
- Police: Kent
- Fire: Kent
- Ambulance: South East Coast
- UK Parliament: Herne Bay and Sandwich

Westbrook is a Victorian seaside resort on the Thanet peninsula in the southeast corner of England. It is the westernmost part of Margate and is part of the ribbon development of the north Kent coast. Westgate-on-Sea lies to the west.

Running through it is the main Canterbury Road where the Royal Sea Bathing Hospital stands, although the building is currently redeveloped into apartments. The row of shops opposite the hospital entrance includes Clarke and Crittenden. The Dog & Duck pub has been turned into offices for the Hospital Building site. A chapel stands in the grounds with, in 2024, planning permission for conversion into apartments.

== History ==
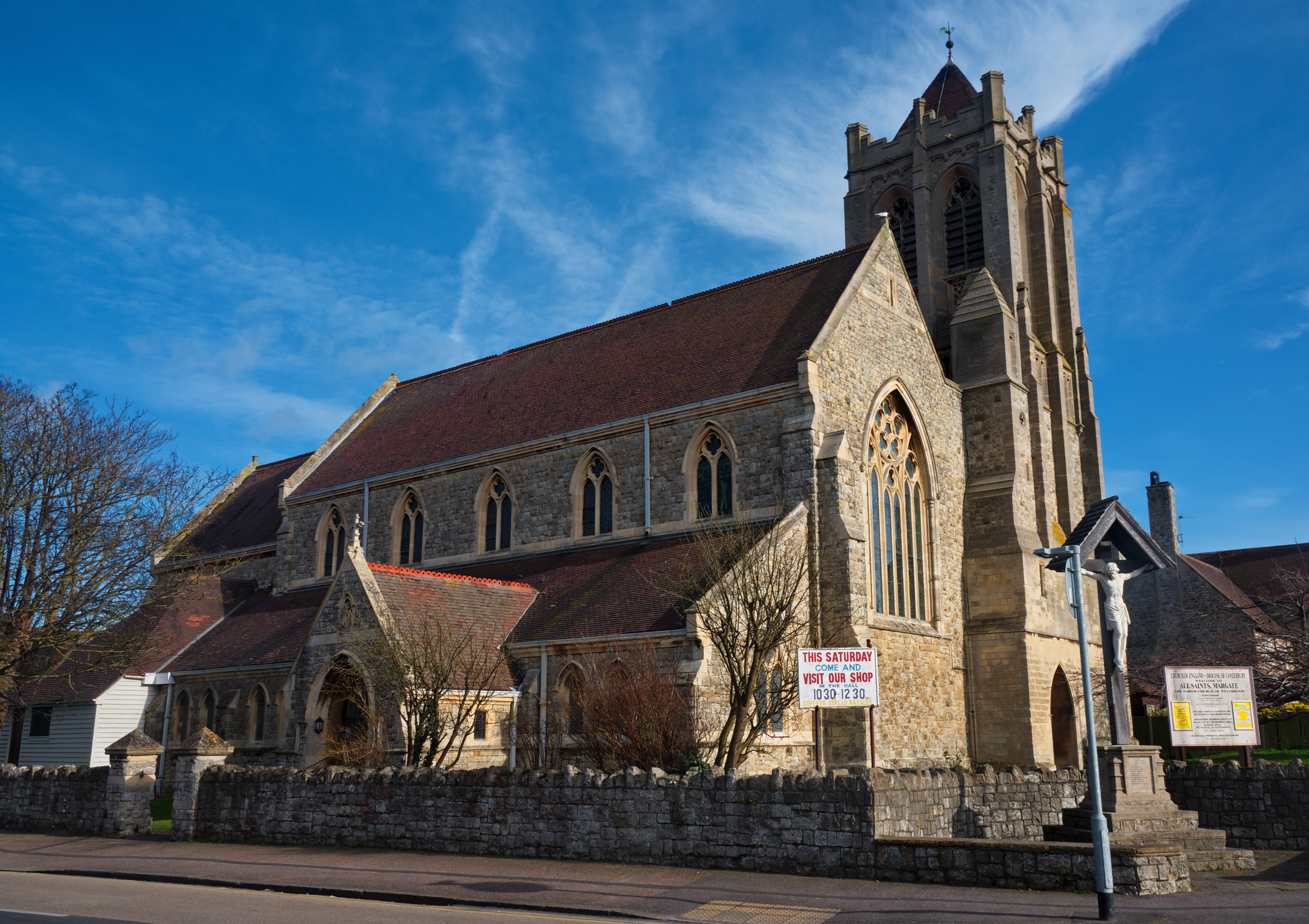
All Saints Church in Westbrook, Kent

Westbrook's parish church is All Saints Church, a Victorian era church standing on All Saints Avenue. The church was built in 1894 out of ragstone by a local architect, T. Andrews. The building uses lancet windows and Geometrical Tracery. The nave is clerestoried, with Lean-to aisles and a lower chancel The two-story southeast vestries were added in 1897 by E. S. Prior, and the southwest tower was added in 1909 by W. D. Caröe.

The ground story of the tower is ashlar dressed, while the top stage mixes Decorated and Perpendicular Gothic styles. Architectural historian John Newman observes the interplay between the smooth and textured surfaces of the tower as being "typical" of Caröe. The tower ends in a recessed tiled pyramid roof. In the east of the chancel, there is stained glass of the Nativity, and in the west of the nave, a stained glass representation of Te Deum, installed in 1910 by G. J. Hunt. Further glass was installed in the aisle windows from 1905 onwards, and signed by G. J. Hunt in the south as well as Percy Bacon in the north.

== Demography ==
Westbrook compared
2001 UK Census	Westbrook ward	Thanet borough	England
Population	4,319	126,702	49,138,831
Foreign born	6.7%	5.1%	9.2%
White	97.8%	97.7%	90.9%
Asian	0.9%	0.9%	4.6%
Black	0.3%	0.3%	2.3%
Christian	72.9%	73.6%	71.7%
Muslim	0.3%	0.5%	3.1%
Hindu	0.3%	0.2%	1.1%
No religion	12.9%	15.9%	14.6%
Unemployed	3.5%	4.4%	3.3%
Retired	14.1%	17.5%	13.5%

At the 2001 UK census, the Westbrook electoral ward had a population of 4,319. The ethnicity was 97.8% white, 1% mixed race, 0.9% Asian, 0.3% black and 0% other. The place of birth of residents was 93.3% United Kingdom, 1.4% Republic of Ireland, 1.6% other Western European countries, and 3.7% elsewhere. Religion was recorded as 72.9% Christian, 0.2% Buddhist, 0.3% Hindu, 0% Sikh, 0.2% Jewish, and 0.3% Muslim. 12.9% were recorded as having no religion, 0.4% had an alternative religion and 12.8% did not state their religion.

The economic activity of residents aged 16–74 was 37.4% in full-time employment, 11.9% in part-time employment, 11.1% self-employed, 3.5% unemployed, 2.5% students with jobs, 3.4% students without jobs, 14.1% retired, 6% looking after home or family, 6.8% permanently sick or disabled and 3.5% economically inactive for other reasons. The industry of employment of residents was 16% retail, 11% manufacturing, 7.4% construction, 8.8% real estate, 21.6% health and social work, 8.9% education, 5.8% transport and communications, 5.3% public administration, 4.9% hotels and restaurants, 2.9% finance, 1.1% agriculture and 6.3% other. Compared with national figures, the ward had a relatively high proportion of workers in health and social work, and a relatively low proportion in agriculture, finance, and real estate. Of the ward's residents aged 16–74, 16.7% had a higher education qualification or the equivalent, compared with 19.9% nationwide.

== Notable people ==
- Richard Davis (1966–2003), English cricketer who was born in Westbrook

== Sources ==
- Newman, John (2013). Kent: North East and East. The Buildings of England. New Haven, US and London: Yale University Press. ISBN 978-0-300-18506-5. OCLC 1114904691.
