= William Arthur Bone =

English chemist (1871–1938)

William Arthur Bone, FRS (19 March 1871 – 11 June 1938) was a British fuel technologist and chemist.

== Biography ==
Bone was born in Stockton-on-Tees, the son of Christopher Bone, a tea merchant, and his wife Mary Elizabeth. He was educated at Middlesbrough High School, the Ackworth Quaker school and Stockton High School. After a year at the Leys School, Cambridge he studied Chemistry and Physics at Owens College, Manchester (now the University of Manchester), followed by a scholarship year at the University of Heidelberg.

Bone was married twice: firstly in 1896 to Kate Hind, daughter of the Mayor of Stockton, with whom he had a son and two daughters before her death in 1914 and secondly in 1916 to Mabel Isabel Liddeard, who died in 1922.

== Academic career ==
After a period as Lecturer in Chemistry and Metallurgy at Manchester, where he was Elected to membership of the Manchester Literary and Philosophical Society on 2 May 1905 whilst studying hydrocarbon combustion. Bone was appointed Livesey Professor of Coal Gas and Fuel Industries at the University of Leeds in 1906. There he set up a new Department of Fuel Technology and continued to study the mechanics of fuel combustion. In 1912 he made his last move, this time to the Department of Chemical Technology at Imperial College, London, again concentrating on the investigation of combustion. During World War I (1914–18) he carried out research on fuel problems associated with the war and trained chemists for duties in munition factories. He retired in 1936.

He was elected a Fellow of the Royal Society in 1905. He delivered their Bakerian Lecture in 1932 (on hydrocarbon combustion) and was awarded their Davy Medal in 1936 "For his pioneer work on contact catalysis and his researches on the mechanism of combustion of hydrocarbons and on the nature of flames and on gaseous explosions".

He was awarded the Franklin Institute's Howard N. Potts Medal in 1912 and the Liversidge award of the Royal Society of Chemistry in 1930.

In 1957, 19 years after his death, Institute of Fuel (now the Energy Institute) created the Bone-Wheeler medal, jointly honouring Bone and Richard Vernon Wheeler. The medal was awarded annually to the most promising chemical engineer under the age of 30.

== Publications ==
He published several books; Coal and its Scientific Uses in 1918, Flame and Combustion with D.T.A.Townend in 1927 and Coal and its Constitution and Uses with G.W.Himus in 1936.
