= Lorna Arnold =

British military historian (1915–2014)

Lorna Arnold OBE FInstP
- Arnold in Washington, D.C., 1947
- Born: Lorna Margaret Rainbow; 7 December 1915; Harlesden, Middlesex, England
- Died: 25 March 2014 (aged 98); Cumnor, Oxfordshire, England
- Known for: History of the UK nuclear weapons programme
- Awards: Officer of the Order of the British Empire
- Scientific career
- Fields: History of science
- Workplaces: United Kingdom Atomic Energy Authority

Lorna Margaret Arnold OBE (née Rainbow; 7 December 1915 – 25 March 2014) was a British historian who wrote several books connected with the British nuclear weapons programmes.

A graduate of Bedford College, London, she trained as a teacher at the Cambridge Training College for Women, but left teaching in 1940. During the Second World War, she served with the Army Council secretariat. In 1944, she transferred to the Foreign Office to head a section of the secretariat of the European Advisory Commission. In June 1945, she moved to Berlin as part of the Allied Control Council, working in the Economic Directorate alongside counterparts from France, America and Russia to co-ordinate administering the districts and supplying food to the population. She was posted to Washington, D.C., in November 1946 as part of the British negotiating team that agreed to merge the U.S. and British zones of Allied-occupied Germany into Bizonia, and remained at the Pentagon until 1949.

In January 1959, she joined the United Kingdom Atomic Energy Authority (UKAEA), where she worked within its Authority Health and Safety Branch (AHSB), coordinating the investigation of the 1957 Windscale fire, about which she would later write a book. In 1967, she joined Margaret Gowing in writing the history of the British nuclear weapons programmes. As its second official historian, she had access to previously secret documents and personally knew many of the people involved. She produced histories of the 1957 Windscale fire, the nuclear weapons tests in Australia and the British hydrogen bomb programme. In her old age she was still an active participant in intelligence/historical community debate.

== Early years ==
Lorna Margaret Rainbow was born at 35 Craven Park, Harlesden, Middlesex, on 7 December 1915, the eldest of five children of Kenneth Wallace Rainbow and Lorna Pearl Rainbow (née Dawson). She had three younger sisters, Hilary, Rosemary and Ruth, and a younger brother, Geoffrey. Her father served in the First World War with the Royal Naval Division and the Royal Navy Air Service. After the war he became a farmer, and the family moved to a farm called Flexwood near Guildford. She became a vegetarian when she realised at dinner one night that a cow her parents had sold had probably not found a better home.

Rainbow attended Wanborough Primary School. No girls in her village had won a scholarship to attend secondary school before Rainbow sat for the examination in 1927, but she was awarded one, along with two other girls. She started at the Guildford County School for Girls in September 1927. The family moved to a dairy farm called Little Prestwick Farm near Haslemere in 1931, but she remained at Guildford, becoming its first student to win a scholarship to university. She sat exams for both Reading University and the University of London in 1934, and was offered scholarships by both. She opted to enter Bedford College, London, a small women's college of the University of London. It was the first college in the United Kingdom to award degrees to women. She studied English, graduating in 1937 with a Bachelor of Arts degree with upper second-class honours.

After graduation, Rainbow trained as a teacher at the Cambridge Training College for Women, a small women's college with about fifty or sixty students at the time. Although it is adjacent to Fenner's, the University of Cambridge's cricket ground, it was not at the time a college of the University, and would not be accepted as one until 2007. She graduated with her teaching certificate, which allowed her to secure a position teaching English at Belper School in 1938. She began having fainting spells, and returned to the family's Little Prestwick Farm in 1940.

== Second World War, Berlin and Bizonia ==
Una Ellis-Fermor, who had been one of Rainbow's lecturers at Bedford, found her a position as a clerk at the Ministry of Pensions in Cambridge, where she also lectured part-time for adult education classes. At this point she received a telegram from the Ministry of Labour and National Service, who were tracking down graduates not working for the war effort, and was instructed to report for duty at the War Office. She served as part of Army Council secretariat, working for Lieutenant Colonel Alan Mocatta. There she took on increasing responsibilities, many related to supply and logistics for the war effort. As D-Day drew near, her workload became intense, and she took Benzedrine. During this time, she lived in London with her aunt Phyl on Kensington High Street. After her father joined the Army, her mother and siblings left the family farm and moved to the same street, about 1 mile (1.6 km) away. Like many Londoners, they experienced the hazards of the German air raids on London. She served as a neighbourhood fire warden. The windows of her office at the War Office were blown in twice, and were then replaced with scrim.

Soon after D-Day in 1944, Rainbow transferred to the Foreign Office to head a section of the secretariat of the European Advisory Commission (EAC) at Norfolk House, making arrangements for the post-war administration of Germany. In June 1945, she moved to Berlin as part of the Allied Control Council. For a time, she slept with a revolver under her pillow during the turbulent times just after the Battle of Berlin. After the Second World War, Allied-occupied Germany was divided into four zones, managed by the British, American, French and Russians. Berlin was also divided into four zones, and Rainbow worked as the UK secretary in the Economic Directorate alongside counterparts from France, America and Russia to co-ordinate administering the districts and supplying food to the population.

Britain had very limited resources at the end of the war, but the British Zone was the most populated, most industrialised, and most devastated by Allied bombing, and therefore the most expensive for the occupier. The British government decided to reduce the cost by sharing the burden with the United States. Rainbow returned to London to work on this project, and was then sent to Washington, D.C., as part of the British negotiating team. She sailed on the RMS Queen Mary, arriving in New York in November 1946. The Americans agreed to merge the U.S. and British zones into Bizonia, with the two nations sharing the costs equally. To deal with issues arising from the agreement, a small staff remained in Washington, and Rainbow was selected to be part of it. After spending Christmas in London, she flew to New York in January 1947. During her time in Washington, she had a desk at the Pentagon, and lived in a house on P Street which she shared with two other women from the British Embassy. She attempted to get the best possible deal for Britain; whenever possible, purchases were made in sterling, and shipping was with the Cunard Line. Eventually, the British government found even half the cost of Bizonia too much to bear, resulting in further negotiations. In 1949, she returned to England on the RMS Mauretania.

== Marriage and family ==
Rainbow took a position with the Family Planning Association (FPA). On 26 July 1949, she married Robert Arnold, an American choirmaster and recording engineer she had met in Washington, D.C., and changed her name to Lorna Arnold. They had two sons, Geoffrey, born in 1950, and Stephen, born in 1952. She continued working at the FPA until three weeks before Geoffrey was born. The family initially lived rent free in an attic apartment at No. 3 Cheyne Walk in Chelsea, where Robert had a part-time job restoring a collection of Elizabethan-era musical instruments such as virginals, harpsichords and clavichords, that had been donated to the National Trust by Benton Fletcher. The lower floors of the building were a museum for the instruments.

In late 1952, the National Trust moved the collection of keyboard instruments to Fenton House, and the family moved to Brondesbury Road, and then, in 1953, to a house they bought in Oxgate Gardens. Robert worked for the BBC as a studio manager for The Goon Show and the BBC World Service, and then for EMI, where he was involved with the development of stereophonic sound and the LP record. Her health deteriorated after Stephen's birth, and she had a hysterectomy. Her aunt Phyl took care of the children while she recovered. In 1955, her husband, unable to reconcile his lifestyle with his homosexuality, returned to the United States, and she became a single mother. She returned to work, initially in a biscuit factory, and then in a series of clerical jobs.

== United Kingdom Atomic Energy Authority ==
A chance lunchtime meeting with a wartime colleague in 1958 led Arnold to apply for a position at the Ministry of Health. The Director of Establishments there asked if he might forward her details to his counterpart at the United Kingdom Atomic Energy Authority (UKAEA), which he knew was expanding due to the 1957 Windscale fire, there being multiple inquiries into the disaster. To her surprise, her secretariat skills in writing and coordinating reports and studies were exactly what the UKAEA was looking for, and she was hired. After a security background check, she commenced work on 2 January 1959, with the Authority Health and Safety Branch (AHSB). She worked on the Veale Committee on Training in Radiation Safety, and, after it wound up, as personal assistant to the director, Andrew MacLean.

In 1967, Arnold was abruptly reassigned as the UKAEA Records Officer, vice Margaret Gowing, who had published the first volume of the history of the British nuclear weapons programme, Britain and Atomic Energy (1964). In 1966, Gowing had become a Reader in Contemporary History at the new University of Kent, Canterbury, covering scientific, technical, economic and social history, and was only working at the UKAEA part-time. The UKAEA therefore decided that Gowing needed an assistant. There was some urgency; the Public Records Act 1967 had reduced the period in which public records were closed to the public from fifty to thirty years. This meant that unless deemed "sensitive", the records of the UKAEA would begin to be transferred to the Public Record Office and become available to the public in the 1970s. Getting the records in order and examined for secret material was an enormous and time-consuming task. Under the 1958 US–UK Mutual Defence Agreement, American secrets had been shared with the United Kingdom, so the job also involved liaison with American archivists. To be closer to the Atomic Energy Research Establishment at Harwell, and the Atomic Weapons Establishment at Aldermaston, she sold her house in London and bought one on the outskirts of Oxford, from which she could more conveniently reach these establishments via the A34.

Gowing and Arnold published their two-volume Independence and Deterrence: Britain and Atomic Energy, 1945–52 in 1974, covering the post-war British atomic bomb programme, to which Arnold contributed six chapters. The success of this work, even before it was published, led to Gowing becoming the first occupant of a new chair in the history of science at the University of Oxford in 1972. Arnold was honoured as an Officer of the Order of the British Empire (OBE) in the 1977 New Year Honours. With the concurrence of the UKAEA Board, Gowing and Arnold then turned to the task of writing the next instalment of the history of the British nuclear weapons programme, about the British hydrogen bomb programme. The work proceeded slowly, but during the 1980s, there was increased interest in the nuclear weapons tests in Australia, and the Australian government created the McClelland Royal Commission to investigate them. Having written the chapter on these for the book with Gowing, Arnold decided to produce a book. A Very Special Relationship: British Atomic Weapon Trials in Australia. It received mixed reviews, Her Majesty's Stationery Office did not market it well, and it was not available in Australia. She later produced an updated edition, Britain, Australia and the Bomb: The Nuclear Tests and Their Aftermath in 2005 with Mark Smith from the University of Southampton.

Arnold returned to working on the hydrogen bomb book, but 1987 was the 30th anniversary of the Windscale accident. Rather than let the records of the accident and subsequent inquiries be released over several years, Arnold persuaded the Public Records Office to release them all at once. In meetings with the various responsible government agencies, the topic of a book about Windscale came up, and Arnold decided to write one, which became Windscale 1957: Anatomy of a Nuclear Accident in 1992. Gowing, in poor health, retired from the UKAEA in 1993. By this time her two research assistants had also left, and Arnold feared that the UKAEA Council would shut down the hydrogen bomb book project, which she hoped to follow up with one on the UK civil nuclear power programme. The UKAEA Council decided to press on with the project, asking Arnold to stay on although she was now over seventy years old. In 1993, she was joined by Katherine Pyne, an aircraft engineer working on a history degree, who became her research assistant for two years. However, the end was in sight. The UKAEA no longer had responsibility for nuclear weapons, and management was not interested in it. With funds for the project almost exhausted, the UKAEA Council decided that Arnold should retire in 1996. She loaded her notes into her car and took them home. Sympathetic friends at the Ministry of Defence found some money to cover her expenses, and she doggedly worked on it from home. Britain and the H-Bomb finally appeared in 2001.

== Later life ==
Arnold was a Fellow of the Institute of Physics, a rare accolade for a non-physicist, and was a recipient of an Honorary Fellowship of the Society for Radiological Protection. In 2009, she received an honorary Doctorate of Letters from the University of Reading for her work in nuclear history. She was introduced to Scilla Elworthy, one of the leaders of the Oxford Research Group, one of the UK's leading advocates for alternatives to global conflict, in the 1980s by her friend, physicist Rudolf Peierls. Through Elworthy, Arnold became active in the movement for nuclear disarmament. She participated in a series of video presentations on issues of nuclear weapons and nuclear energy for Talkworks, an organisation that focused on dangers associated with nuclear weapons. She also worked with television productions, including two BBC television documentaries on Windscale in 1990 and 2007, and a six-part documentary The Nuclear Age. which was cancelled by the BBC. In an episode of the BBC radio programme A Room with a View, she visited the room at the University of Birmingham where Peierls had worked on the Frisch–Peierls memorandum.

Arnold became legally blind in 2002, but in 2012, aged 96, published her memoirs, entitled My Short Century, in which she described her life from living on a farm, and friendships with noted figures in the world of nuclear research and development; "but also", noted the Daily Telegraph, "chronicled the life of one of the many thousands of women denied greater eminence because of their sex." She died at Oxenford House care home in Cumnor, Oxfordshire, on 25 March 2014 after suffering a stroke. She was survived by her two sons.

== Published works ==
- (1974). Independence and Deterrence: Britain and Atomic Energy, 1945–52: Volume 1: Policy Making. (With Margaret Gowing). London: Macmillan. ISBN 0-333-15781-8.
- (1974). Independence and Deterrence: Britain and Atomic Energy, 1945–52: Volume 2: Policy Execution. (With Margaret Gowing). London: Macmillan. ISBN 0-333-16695-7.
- (1987). A Very Special Relationship: British Atomic Weapon Trials in Australia. London: HMSO Books. ISBN 0-11-772412-2.
- (2001) Britain and the H-Bomb. London: Palgrave Macmillan ISBN 0-312-23518-6 (with Katherine Pyne)
- (2005) Britain, Australia and the Bomb: The Nuclear Tests and Their Aftermath. (International Papers in Political Economy) (with Mark Smith) London: Palgrave Macmillan ISBN 1-4039-2101-6
- (2007) Windscale 1957: Anatomy of a Nuclear Accident. London: Palgrave Macmillan ISBN 0-230-57317-7
- (2012) My Short Century. Palo Alto, California: Cumnor Hill Books ISBN 978-0-9837029-0-0
