= South Northumberland Cricket Club =

South Northumberland Cricket Club (often referred to as South North) is a cricket club, founded in 1864, based at the Roseworth Terrace ground in Gosforth, Newcastle upon Tyne, England. They play in the North East Premier League, a competition which they have won on ten occasions. They have also won the ECB National Club Cricket Championship on three occasions, most recently in 2016 and the ECB National Club Twenty20 twice, most recently in 2017.
