= North East Premier League =

Club cricket league in England

- Countries: England
- Administrator: ECB
- Format: Limited Overs
- First edition: 1999
- Tournament format: League
- Number of teams: 12 (Premier Division)
- Current champion: South Northumberland CC
- Most successful: South Northumberland CC (16 titles)
- Website: https://nepremierleague.play-cricket.com/

The North East Premier League is the top level of competition for recreational club cricket in the North East, serving the historic counties of Durham and Northumberland. Since 2000 it has been a designated ECB Premier League. In 2013, the league expanded into two divisions (Premier and Division 1) following a restructure of the cricketing leagues in the North East of England. Subsequently, the Durham & Northeast Cricket League and Northumberland and Tyneside Cricket League began to feed into the NEPL in the revised pyramid structure for the purposes of promotion and relegation.

The 2020 competition was cancelled because of the COVID-19 pandemic. A replacement competition was organised for the later part of the season when cricket again became possible, but with the winners not to be regarded as official league champions.

The most successful team has been South Northumberland who have been champions on fifteen occasions, including six consecutive championships between 2003 and 2008.

== Champions ==
- League Champions 2000–2019
  Year	Club
  2000	Sunderland
  2001	Chester-le-Street
  2002	Benwell Hill
  2003	South Northumberland
  2004	South Northumberland
  2005	South Northumberland
  2006	South Northumberland
  2007	South Northumberland
  2008	South Northumberland
  2009	Chester-le-Street
  2010	Chester-le-Street
  2011	South Northumberland
  2012	South Northumberland
  2013	Stockton
  2014	South Northumberland
  2015	South Northumberland
  2016	Chester-le-Street
  2017	South Northumberland
  2018	South Northumberland
  2019	Burnmoor
- League Champions 2020–Present
  Year	Club
  2020	no competition
  2021	South Northumberland
  2022	South Northumberland
  2023	South Northumberland
  2024	Burnmoor
  2025	Burnmoor
  2026	South Northumberland

== Performance by season from 2000 ==
Key
Gold	Champions
Blue	Left League
Red	Relegated

Premier Division performance by season, from 2000
Club	2000	2001	2002	2003	2004	2005	2006	2007	2008	2009	2010	2011	2012	2013	2014	2015	2016	2017	2018	2019	2021	2022	2023	2024	2025	2026
Ashington																							7	3	10	7
Benwell Hill	7	2	1	9	5	4	5	6	11	4	3	4	11	7	5	5	10	4	7	7	3	7	8	12		12
Blaydon	3	3	7	6	3	10	4	3	5	2	5	3	2	5	4	12										
Burnmoor																				1	2	2	2	1	1	2
Burnopfield																				8	10	10	4	5	7	3
Castle Eden																							5	9	3	9
Chester-le-Street	6	1	5	4	4	2	2	5	3	1	1	2	3	6	3	2	1	3	2	3	4	6	3	4	5	5
Durham Academy	2	5	8	2	7	6	6	4	6	8	4	6	5	10	10	4	5	5	9							
Eppleton																			11	7	8	12				
Felling																		11	10	11	8	4	9	7	4	4
Gateshead Fell	8	11	6	12	9	3	8	9	9	7	8	12	12	11	11	11	12									
Hetton Lyons							12				10	5	7	3	2	6	7	6	3	5	5	3	11		6	6
Newcastle	11	4	10	8	8	11	11	10	12	11	6	8	10	4	6	3	2	2	5	12		5	6	10	8	8
Norton	5	9	9	10	11	9	10	11	8	12																
Philadelphia			4	7	12	12																				
Sacriston																			11	9	12					
Seaham Harbour																										10
Shotley Bridge																									9	11
South Northumberland	4	8	2	1	1	1	1	1	1	3	2	1	1	2	1	1	4	1	1	2	1	1	1	2	2	1
South Shields								7	2	5	11	11	8	12		9	6	12								
Stockton	9	7	11	3	6	5	9	12	7	9	7	10	6	1	7	10	9	9	12							
Sunderland	1	6	3	5	2	7	7	2	4	6	9	7	4	9	12							11		6	12	
Tynedale																								11		
Tynemouth	10	10	12	11	10	8	3	8	10	10	12	9	9	8	8	7	3	8	4	6	6	9	10	8	11	
Washington																					11					
Whitburn															9	8	8	10	6	10	9	8	12			
References																										
