= The Grangefield Ground =

Sport grounds in Stockton, County Durham, England

Coordinates: 54°33′58″N 1°20′15″W

- Grangefield Road
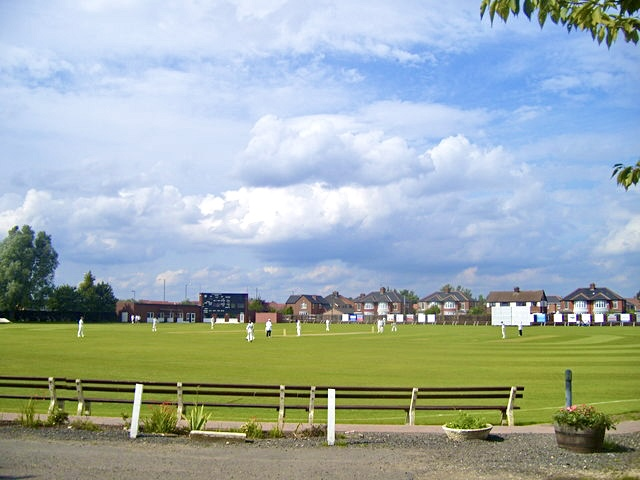
- Interactive map of The Grangefield Ground
- Full name: The Grangefield Ground
- Address: 52a Oxbridge Avenue; Grangefield; Stockton-on-Tees; TS18 4JF
- Capacity: 4,000
- Type: Multi-purpose sports ground
- Events: Cricket; Rugby union
- Surface: Grass

Construction
- Opened: 1891; 4 June 1892 (cricket); 2015 (rugby)

Tenants
- Stockton Cricket Club (1892–present); Durham Cricket Board (2000); Stockton RFC (2015–present); Durham CCC (1947–2006)

The Grangefield Ground is a multi-purpose sport grounds located in Grangefield, Stockton-on-Tees, England. It focuses on cricket and rugby union. It is the home of Stockton Cricket Club since 1892 and Stockton Rugby Football Club since 2015. The rugby club came after a 67-year stay at the Norton Sports Complex.

== Grounds ==
=== Rugby ===
Stockton Rugby Football Club moved to The Grangefield Ground in 2015. The lease included the use of the indoor facility (which includes four changing rooms and a multi-purpose sports hall), and (initially) three rugby union pitches behind The Grangefield Academy school (which is The Grangefield Ground) whereas the clubhouse is located over the road on (community partner) Stockton Cricket Club's ground, where another 2 junior rugby union pitches are located. The ground's set-up is similar to the club's previous ground located in Norton. The Academy shares the rugby pitches, which are used for physical education purposes.

Two more existing rugby pitches and changing rooms, part of a five-acre site, are located behind the pitches, which Stockton leased in 2019, with plans in place to develop the site for Woman and Girls rugby. The site became available for use from 31 October, with the changing rooms being modified with Stockton's club colours and badge being painted into exterior walls, the pitches were marked and new posts were added.

== See also ==
- List of cricket grounds in England and Wales
