= Kate Pyne =

British historian

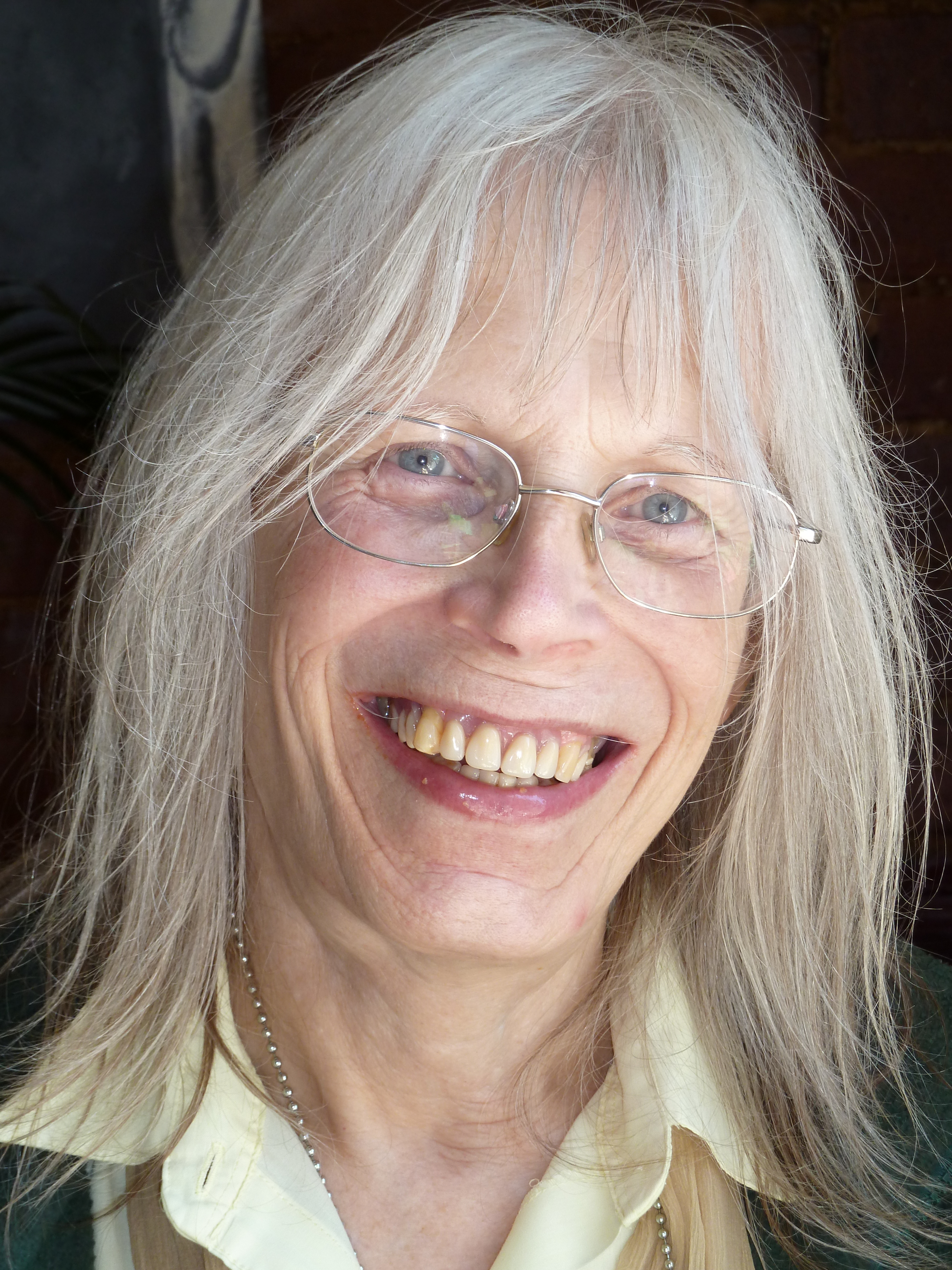
- Portrait of Pyne at the Turners arms, Mortimer, Berkshire, UK
- Born: June 16, 1943; Gloucester, UK
- Died: June 20, 2015 (aged 72); Basingstoke, UK
- Education: Queen Mary and Westfield College, University of London
- Occupation: Historian
- Employer: Atomic Weapons Research Establishment

Kate Pyne (June 16, 1943 – June 20, 2015) was an English historian working at the Atomic Weapons Establishment (AWE), Aldermaston. Her work there included the writing of technical history on various aspects of the British nuclear weapons programme from its earliest days to the present time. Prior to taking a degree in Modern History at Queen Mary and Westfield College, University of London, she worked for many years in the aircraft industry.

== Academia ==
Pyne's historical methodologies were made possible by her attending a taught course at Queen Mary & Westfield College, London, where she read Modern History, under the tutelage of Peter Hennessy and his team.

Pyne arrived at Queen Mary as a mature student, aged 48, having spent her life savings in paying the University fees. In her first year she won the Skeel Prize for a long essay on Air Power, completed during the summer vacation. In her second year she won a Bursary to spend the long vacation at King's College, Cambridge to begin work on her final year historical research project on the British hydrogen bomb. She graduated in July 1994 with first class honours in Modern History, for which she was awarded a Drapers' Company Prize and an Attlee Prize.

At the time of her death she was close to completing her PhD on the UK's first hydrogen weapons at King's College London under the supervision of Professor Mike Goodman. On 1 March 2016 Pyne was posthumously awarded her PhD in Nuclear History (Certificate No. 075157).

== Professional career ==
After graduation in 1994, Pyne became Research Assistant to Lorna Arnold, Historian at the Atomic Energy Authority, Harwell, who was writing the official history of the British hydrogen bomb. When that job finished in 1996, she was offered a post at AWE, Aldermaston, what some wag called 'the jam factory' - in honour of one of the contractor firms that built the place – going under the name of 'Chivers'.

Pyne could command an audience of up to 500 people on site to come and listen to lectures on nuclear history, whether it was a quick gallop through 50–70 years of history of the development of AW(R)E as part of the UKAEA weapons group, MoD(PE) or lately as a GOCO, or on a specific weapon system and its delivery. This extended to outreach activities in the local community, giving transparency to AWE's activities.

Pyne played a similar role in developing and sustaining the annual Charterhouse Conferences organized by Nicholas Hill and Lesley and Dave Wright for many years. These covered both aeronautical and nuclear issues.

Pyne, then aged 65, registered as a part-time post-graduate research student at King's College Department of War Studies on January 9, 2008, to study for a PhD because she wanted to know how the United Kingdom acquired the knowledge to design and build thermonuclear warheads.

== Public lectures ==
A large part of her outreach activities was centred on giving public lectures to the local community, mostly in her own time, in the evenings. Below is a selection of her lectures, always updated and tweaked depending on the audience.

- 1997-11-22 '40th Anniversary of the Grapple Trials'. AWE, held at AWE, Aldermaston, RecSoc.
- 1999-02-17 'Aldermaston, Tadley and the Bomb, Part 1: 1938-1960'. Tadley Local History Group, held at St Paul's Church Hall, The Green, Tadley.
- 1999-04-07 'The Blue Streak Warheads'. Blue Streak Conference, 7–8 April 1999, held at Charterhouse School, Godalming.
- 1999-06-10 'A Gallop through the History of AWE'. Sixth Form (actually 4th form), held at Charterhouse School, Godalming.
- 2000-06-21 'AWRE Aldermaston in the years, Part 2: 1960-1980 The Site comes of age'. Tadley Historical Society, held at St Paul's Church Hall, The Green, Tadley.
- 2000-10-10 'The History of British Nuclear Weapons: Why? When? and How?'. Institution of Mechanical Engineers (IMechE), held at Reading University.
- 2001-02-02 'Mending Aircraft in Faraway Places With Strange Sounding Names'. Basingstoke Ramblers' Association, held at Trinity Methodist Church Hall, Sarum Hill, Basingstoke.
- 2001-04-10 'Make Your bleedin' minds up! - The Blue Steel Warheads'. British Rocketry Oral History Programme (BROHP) Conference in 10–12 April 2001, held at Charterhouse School, Godalming.
- 2001-10-16 'Turning on the Light – The Discovery of the Hydrogen Bomb Principles at AWRE'. Mathematics Dept, Manchester University, held at Manchester University, Manchester.
- 2001-11-09 'We have got to have this thing and it's got to have the bloody Union Jack on it!' - The Story of the First British Atomic Bomb'. University of the Third Age, held at Farnborough Technical College, Farnborough.
- 2002-04-02 'The Real Story of the Interim Weapon'. British Rocketry Oral History Programme (BROHP) Conference, 2–4 April 2002, held at Charterhouse School, Godalming.
- 2002-04-03 'Dark Horse - The Chevaline Project 1961-1982'. British Rocketry Oral History Programme (BROHP) Conference, 2–4 April 2002, held at Charterhouse School, Godalming.
- 2002-05-16 'The British Hydrogen Bomb'. Seminar at Southampton University, held at Southampton University, Southampton.
- 2003-04-10 'Warheads and Rockets - Nuclear warheads for almost anything with a point at one end and a flame at the other!'. British Rocketry Oral History Programme (BROHP) Conference, 10–12 April 2003, held at Charterhouse School, Godalming.
- 2003-07-07 'The British Thermonuclear Bluff Revisited'. Institute of Contemporary British History (ICBH) Summer Conference, held at Senate House, University of London, London.
- 2003-10-30 'The Origins of the British Nuclear Weapon Programme and the Early Years of AWE'. Kingsclere Historical Society, held at Kingsclere Community Centre, Kingsclere.
- 2003-12-02 'Vertical Take-off - The British get a few hints from Wartime German work OR do they?'. Berkshire Aviation Trust, held at Bulmershe College, Woodley, Reading.
- 2004-04-01 'Downhill Struggle - The Story of the First British Liquid Fuelled Rocket Motor'. British Rocketry Oral History Programme (BROHP) Conference, April 2004, held at Charterhouse School, Godalming.
- 2004-10-07 'Turning on the Light' - Britain Discovers the Principles of the Hydrogen Bomb'. Maidenhead Modellers Club, held at Farnborough.
- 2004-10-28 'More Complex than Expected' - The Atomic Weapons Research Establishment's Contribution to the Chevaline Payload'. Royal Aeronautical Society's Unclassified Conference on Chevaline, held at Royal Aeronautical Society, London.
- 2006-04-06 "'As soon as possible ...' - Why the Blue Danube bomb could not go into RAF service straight after the 1952 Hurricane Test'". British Rocketry Oral History Programme (BROHP) Conference, 6–8 April 2006, held at Charterhouse School, Godalming.
- 2006-04-06 'X' marks the spot - Which Building at Foulness was used to Assemble the Hurricane weapons?'. British Rocketry Oral History Programme (BROHP) Conference, 6–8 April 2006, held at Charterhouse School, Godalming.
- 2006-07-30 'Warheads and Rockets - Nuclear warheads for almost anything with a point at one end and a flame at the other!'. Explosions – the Royal Navy Museum of Firepower, held at Museum Conference Hall, Heritage Way, Priddy's Hard, Gosport.
- 2009-07-26 'Red Beard' 'Bomb - Aircraft, 2000 lb, Medium capacity, RAF and Royal Navy, for the use of ...'. Explosions – the Royal Navy Museum of Firepower, held at Museum Conference Hall, Heritage Way, Priddy's Hard, Gosport.
- 2010-07-26 'WE177 and The Royal Navy'. Explosions – the Royal Navy Museum of Firepower, held at Museum Conference Hall, Heritage Way, Priddy's Hard, Gosport.
- 2010-10-20 '60 Years of AWE'. Tadley Local History Society, held at St Paul's Church Hall, The Green, Tadley.
- 2011-06-29 'The Last 60 Years of the United Kingdom's Deterrent'. UK Project on Nuclear Issues (PONI) Conference 2011, held at RUSI, Whitehall, London.
- 2011-09-25 'Polaris and The Royal Navy'. Explosions – the Royal Navy Museum of Firepower, held at Museum Conference Hall, Heritage Way, Priddy's Hard, Gosport.
- 2011-10-12 'The Bit that Could Go Bang - AWE's contribution to the UK Deterrent'. Young Generation Network (YGN) - Defence Seminar hosted by Rolls-Royce, 12–13 October 2011, held at Midland Hotel, Derby.
- 2014-02-27 'AWE Over the Years - The Sites, the Stories and a Smidgeon of Science'. The University of the Third Age (U3A), Newbury, held at St Bartholomews School, Newbury.
- 2014-04-22 'AWE Over the Years - The Sites, the Stories and a Taste of Science'. The Institute of Engineering and Technology (IET), held at AWE, Aldermaston, RecSoc, William Penney Theatre.
- 2014-04-23 'AWE Over the Years - The Sites, the Stories and a Smidgeon of Science'. Hungerford Historical Association, held at The Corn Exchange, High Street, Hungerford.
- 2014-07-04 'Britain's Thermonuclear Bluff - Myth and Reality'. Nuclear History Conference, 3–5 July 2014, held at Charterhouse School, Godalming.
- 2014-07-24 'The Vicker Transonic Model'. BIS Space History Conference, 24–26 July 2014, held at Charterhouse School, Godalming.
- 2014-10-15 'AWE over the years ... The Sites, the Stories and a Smidgeon of Science'. Newbury Stroke Association, held at Newbury Racecourse, Newbury.
- 2014-10-29 'The History of AWE'. Newbury District Field Club, held at Newbury.
- 2015-02-18 'The Early History of AWE and its Links with RAE Farnborough'. Institution of Mechanical Engineers (IMechE), held at Fluor Building, Farnborough.
- 2015-02-24 'AWE over the years ... The Sites, the Stories and a Smidgeon of Science'. Berkshire Field Society, held at St John's Church Hall, Newbury.
- 2015-04-01 'The Nuclear Dimension - Developing Warheads for Royal Air Force Special Weapons'. Royal Air Force Historical Society (RAFHS), Hendon, held at Royal Air Force Museum, Hendon, London.

== Bibliography ==
- Pyne, Katherine (1995). "Art or article? The need for and nature of the British hydrogen bomb, 1954–58". Contemporary Record. 9 (3): 562–585. doi:10.1080/13619469508581354. ISSN 1361-9462.
- Arnold, Lorna; Pyne, Katherine (2001). Britain and the H-bomb. Basingstoke, Hampshire: Palgrave. ISBN 978-0-230-59977-2. OCLC 753874620.
- Pyne, Katherine (3 April 2002). Dark Horse - a Short Technical History of the Chevaline Project. Fourth Charterhouse Conference on British Rocketry. Charterhouse, Surrey.
- Pyne, Katherine; Panton, Frank; Dommett, Roy; Orman, Stan (14 April 2003). The Chevaline weapons programme in the 1970s. Charterhouse, Surrey.
- Pyne, Katherine (Spring 2004). "Turning on the Light: The UK Discovery of the H-Bomb Principles". Prospero - the Journal of British Rocketry and Nuclear History. Proceedings from the British Rocketry Oral History Programme Conferences at Charterhouse (1): 66.
- Pyne, Katherine (Spring 2005). "Warheads and rockets - UK nuclear warheads for almost anything with a point at one end and a flame at the other". Prospero - the Journal of British Rocketry and Nuclear History. Proceedings from the British Rocketry Oral History Programme Conferences at Charterhouse (2): 193.
- Pyne, Katherine (28 October 2004). "More complex than expected - the Atomic Weapons Research Establishment's contribution to the Chevaline Payload". Proceedings, Royal Aeronautical Society, London. The History of the UK Strategic Deterrent - The Chevaline Programme: G-1 – G-15.
- Pyne, Katherine (2016). "The Nuclear Dimension - The Development of Warheads for the Royal Air Force". Royal Air Force Historical Society Journal (62): 9–30. ISSN 1361-4231.
