= Stockton Cricket Club =

Cricket club in County Durham, England

Stockton Cricket Club is an English cricket club which plays at Grangefield Cricket Ground in Stockton-on-Tees, County Durham. The club currently plays in the North Yorkshire and South Durham Cricket League (NYSD).

As of 2021 the club field three adult sides and a number of age-group teams, including a Twenty20 under-19 team called Stockton Swifts.

== History ==
Established in 1816, the club moved to its current location, the Grangefield Cricket Ground in 1891. The North Yorkshire and South Durham Cricket League (NYSD) was established in 1893, the club first playing in its 1896 league. The club's 1st XI won the league in its second year of the NYSD. The team subsequently won in 1948 and 1975.

The club was a founding member of the North East Premier League (NEPL) in 1999, moving from the NYSD Division One. Its 1st XI won the NEPL premier division in 2013.

The club moved back to the NYSD in 2019, its top team coming first in the second and first divisions of 2019 and 2020, respectively.
