= Ropery Lane =

Cricket ground in County Durham, England

Coordinates: 54°51′08.29″N 1°34′16.39″W

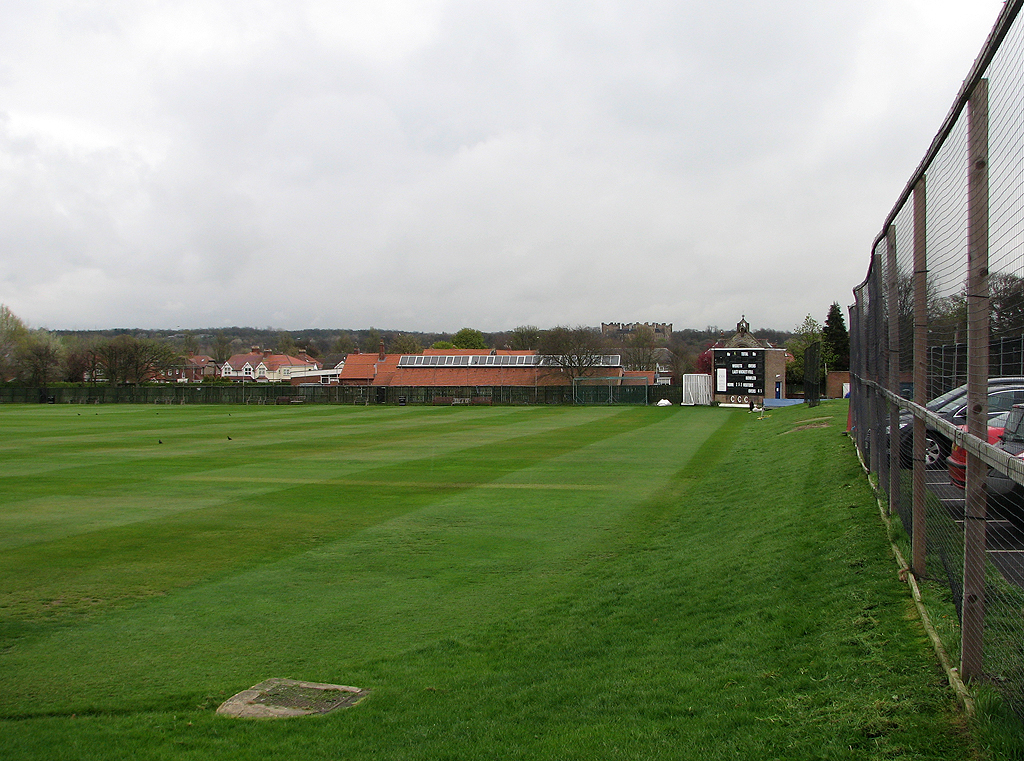
Ropery Lane cricket ground

Ropery Lane is a cricket ground in Chester-le-Street, England round the corner from The Riverside Ground. It is the home of the Chester-le-Street Cricket Club, who play in the North East Premier League.

Prior to Durham County Cricket Club gaining first-class status in 1992, they played six Gillette Cup/Natwest Trophy matches at Ropery Lane, while Minor Counties North also used the ground for a Benson & Hedges Cup game. After Durham became a first-class county, Durham played four 1st XI matches there: one in the County Championship, one in the AXA Equity and Law League and two tour matches against Pakistan and South Africa. The ground has not hosted a 1st XI game since 1994.

The ground has hosted three first-class matches and eight List A matches.

== Game information ==
Game Type	No. of Games
County Championship Matches	1
limited-over county matches	8
Twenty20 matches	0

== Game statistics: first-class ==
Category	Information
Highest Team Score	Nottinghamshire (629 against Durham) in 1993
Lowest Team Score	Durham (164 against Nottinghamshire) in 1993
Best Batting Performance	Chris Lewis (147 Runs for Nottinghamshire against Durham in 1993
Best Bowling Performance	Waqar Younis (5/22 for Pakistan against Durham) in 1992

Game Statistics: one-day matches:

Category	Information
Highest Team Score	Durham (262/7 in 48.1 overs against Nottinghamshire) in 1993
Lowest Team Score	Durham (82 in 40.4 overs against Worcestershire) in 1968
Best Batting Performance	Wayne Larkins (128 Runs for Durham against Nottinghamshire) in 1993
Best Bowling Performance	Simon Davis (7/32 for Durham against Lancashire) in 1983
