= Park Drive (cricket) =

Cricket ground in Hartlepool, England

Coordinates: 54°41′05.02″N 1°14′40.96″W

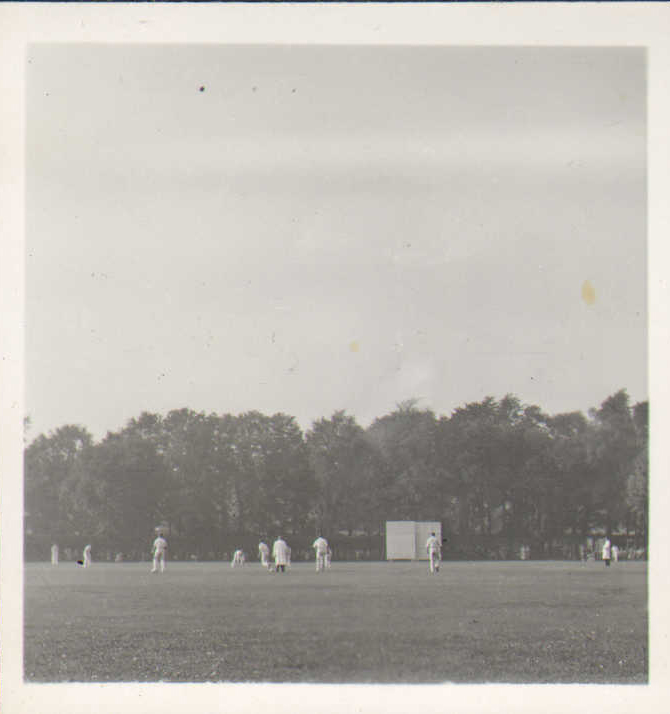
A cricket match being played at Park Drive in July 1955

Park Drive is a cricket ground in Hartlepool, England. Although the ground used to host two or three Durham 1st XI matches each season between 1992 (when the county received first-class status) and 1997, the ground has not been used since for county matches.

The ground has hosted 8 first-class matches and 11 List A matches.

== Game Information ==
Game Type	No. of Games
County Championship Matches	8
limited-over county matches	9
Twenty20 matches	0

=== Game Statistics: first-class ===
Category	Information
Highest Team Score	Durham (545/8dec against Northamptonshire) in 1994
Lowest Team Score	Northamptonshire (156 against Durham) in 1994
Best Batting Performance	John Morris (186 Runs for Durham against Northamptonshire in 1994
Best Bowling Performance	Alan Walker (7/56 for Durham against Nottinghamshire) in 1997

=== Game Statistics: one-day matches ===
Category	Information
Highest Team Score	Northamptonshire (266/3 in 40 overs against Durham) in 1994 and Durham (266/6 in 40 overs against Northamptonshire) in 1994
Lowest Team Score	Minor Counties (156 in 55 overs against Durham) in 1993
Best Batting Performance	Alan Fordham (111 Runs for Northamptonshire against Durham) in 1994
Best Bowling Performance	Roland Lefebvre (4/23 for Glamorgan against Durham) in 1994
