= List of Durham County Cricket Club players =

This is a list in alphabetical order of cricketers who have played for Durham County Cricket Club in top-class matches since December 1991 when the team was elevated to official first-class status, the club joining the County Championship in 1992. Durham has been officially classified as a List A team since 1992, although the county did take part in 27 List A matches between 1964 and 1991. The club has been a first-class Twenty20 team since the inauguration of the Twenty20 Cup in 2003.

The details are the player's usual name followed by the years in which he was active as a Durham player and then his name is given as it usually appears on match scorecards. Note that many players represented other top-class teams besides Durham and that some played for the club in minor counties cricket before 1992. Current players are shown as active to the latest season in which they played for the club. The list excludes Second XI and other players who did not play for the club's first team, as well as the players who only played List A cricket for the team the 1992 season.

== A ==
- Varun Aaron (2014)
- Colin Ackermann (2023/24–2025)
- Harry Adair (2019)
- Kasey Aldridge (2025)
- Nathan Astle (2005)

== B ==
- Archie Bailey (2025)
- Phil Bainbridge (1991–1996)
- Jake Ball (2025)
- Cameron Bancroft (2019–2021)
- David Barrick (2005–2006)
- David Bedingham (2020–2025)
- Farhaan Behardien (2020)
- Solomon Bell (2019)
- Chris Benjamin (2022)
- Dale Benkenstein (2005–2013)
- Philip Berry (1991–1994)
- Melvyn Betts (1993–2000)
- Shaun Birbeck (1994–1996)
- Ian Blackwell (2009–2012)
- Jack Blatherwick (2025)
- Darren Blenkiron (1991–1997)
- Andy Blignaut (2004)
- James Boiling (1994–1998)
- Scott Boland (2024)
- David Boon (1997–1999)
- Scott Borthwick (2008–2025)
- Ian Botham (1992–1993)
- Robbie Bowman (2025)
- Ruel Brathwaite (2010–2012)
- Gareth Breese (2004–2014)
- Graeme Bridge (1999–2006)
- Mark Briers (1991–1993)
- James Brinkley (2001–2002)
- Gary Brown (1988–1992)
- Simon Brown (1991–2002)
- Ryan Buckley (2013–2014)
- Jack Burnham (2015–2021)
- Jonathan Bushnell (2021–2024)

== C ==
- Colin Campbell (1994–1998)
- Jack Campbell (2019–2021)
- Sherwin Campbell (1996)
- Brydon Carse (2016–2025)
- Shivnarine Chanderpaul (2007–2009)
- Steven Chapman (1998–1999)
- Peter Chase (2014)
- Graham Clark (2015–2025)
- Mitchell Claydon (2007–2013)
- Kyle Coetzer (2004–2011)
- Paul Collingwood (1995–2018)
- Sam Conners (2025)
- Geoff Cook (1991–1995)
- Stephen Cook (2017)
- Josh Coughlin (2016–2019)
- Paul Coughlin (2012–2025)
- David Cox (1994–1998)
- Harry Crawshaw (2021)
- Anderson Cummins (1993–1994)

== D ==
- Jimmy Daley (1991–2002)
- Mark Davies (1998–2010)
- Ryan Davies (2018)
- Bas de Leede (2023–2025)
- Sean Dickson (2020–2022)
- Michael Di Venuto (2007–2012)
- Matt Dixon (2018)
- Brendan Doggett (2025)
- Luke Doneathy (2021–2023)
- George Drissell (2022–2025)
- Ben Dwarshuis (2024)

== E ==
- Ned Eckersley (2019–2022)
- Luke Evans (2007–2010)

== F ==
- Vishwa Fernando (2023)
- Michael Foster (1996–1999)
- Andrew Fothergill (1982–1994)
- Zak Foulkes (2025)
- Graeme Fowler (1993–1994)

== G ==
- Emilio Gay (2024–2025)
- Herschelle Gibbs (2012)
- Oli Gibson (2022–2024)
- Ottis Gibson (2006–2007)
- Will Gidman (2007–2010)
- John Glendenen (1988–1993)
- Brandon Glover (2023–2024)
- Lee Goddard (2007–2009)
- Michael Gough (1998–2003)
- David Graveney (1991–1994)

== H ==
- Gavin Hamilton (2004–2005)
- Peter Handscomb (2019)
- George Harding (2017–2019)
- Ben Harmison (2005–2011)
- Steve Harmison (1996–2012)
- Jamie Harrison (2012–2015)
- Gareth Harte (2017–2020)
- John Hastings (2014–2015)
- Nicholas Hatch (2001–2003)
- Paul Henderson (1991–1992)
- Adam Hickey (2016)
- Brad Hodge (2002)
- Daniel Hogg (2024–2025)
- Chemar Holder (2024)
- Quentin Hughes (1991–1995)
- Simon Hughes (1992–1993)
- Ian Hunter (1999–2003)
- Michael Hussey (2005)
- Stewart Hutton (1991–1998)

== I ==
- Imran Tahir (2018)

== J ==
- Keaton Jennings (2012–2017)
- Dean Jones (1992)
- Michael Jones (2018–2024)

== K ==
- Simon Katich (2000)
- Mitchell Killeen (2022–2025)
- Neil Killeen (1991–2010)
- Reon King (2004)
- Matthew Kuhnemann (2023)
- Pallav Kumar (2004)

== L ==
- Wayne Larkins (1991–1995)
- Tom Latham (2017–2018)
- Danny Law (2001–2003)
- James Lawrence (1995)
- Alex Lees (2018–2025)
- Jonathan Lewis (1997–2006)
- Mick Lewis (2005–2006)
- David Ligertwood (1994–1996)
- Jonathan Longley (1994–1996)
- Martin Love (2001–2003)
- James Lowe (2003–2006)
- Steve Lugsden (1993–1998)

== M ==
- Stanley McAlindon (2022–2024)
- Barry McCarthy (2015–2018)
- Steven McEwan (1992–1993)
- Neil McKenzie (2008)
- Ben McKinney (2023–2025)
- Tom Mackintosh (2022–2023)
- Calum MacLeod (2014–2016)
- Nic Maddinson (2022)
- Jimmy Maher (2005–2006)
- Gavin Main (2014–2017)
- Aiden Markram (2018)
- Craig Miles (2023)
- David Miller (2011)
- James Minto (2024–2025)
- Moneeb Iqbal (2006)
- Albie Morkel (2008–2010)
- Max Morley (2013)
- John Morris (1994–1999)
- Muazam Ali (1999–2000)
- Gordon Muchall (2002–2016)
- Haydon Mustard (2023/24–2025)
- Phil Mustard (2002–2016)
- Johann Myburgh (2012)

== N ==
- James Neesham (2025)
- Ashley Noffke (2005)
- Marcus North (2004)

== O ==
- Graham Onions (2004–2017)

== P ==
- Garry Park (2005–2008)
- Paul Parker (1991–1993)
- Callum Parkinson (2023/24–2025)
- Matt Parkinson (2023)
- Wayne Parnell (2023)
- Ajaz Patel (2023)
- Akshar Patel (2018)
- Ian Pattison (1999–2004)
- Nicky Peng (2000–2005)
- Keegan Petersen (2022)
- Nick Phillips (1998–2003)
- Liam Plunkett (2003–2012)
- Matty Potts (2017–2025)
- Stuart Poynter (2016–2021)
- Manoj Prabhakar (1995)
- Andrew Pratt (1991–2004)
- Gary Pratt (2000–2006)
- Dewald Pretorius (2002–2003)
- Migael Pretorius (2023)
- Ryan Pringle (2012–2019)

== R ==
- Ben Raine (2011–2025)
- Rachin Ravindra (2022)
- Will Rhodes (2025)
- Michael Richardson (2010–2019)
- Nathan Rimmington (2018–2020)
- Luke Robinson (2023–2025)
- Ollie Robinson (2022–2025)
- Ryan Robinson (1999–2000)
- Angus Robson (2019)
- Mike Roseberry (1984–1998)
- Chris Rushworth (2004–2022)

== S ==
- Martin Saggers (1996–1998)
- Matt Salisbury (2018–2022)
- Gurjit Sandhu (2016)
- Kumar Sangakkara (2014)
- Mark Saxelby (1994–1995)
- Chris Scott (1991–1996)
- Gary Scott (2001–2008)
- Jason Searle (1994–1998)
- Shafiqullah Ghafari (2025)
- Shoaib Akhtar (2003–2004)
- D'Arcy Short (2019)
- Peter Siddle (2024)
- Ramanpreet Singh (2012)
- Ian Smith (1991–1993)
- Will Smith (2007–2019)
- Nathan Sowter (2022–2025)
- Nick Speak (1997–2001)
- Martin Speight (1997–2001)
- Javagal Srinath (2003)
- Cameron Steel (2017–2020)
- Scott Steel (2019–2020)
- Ben Stokes (2009–2024)
- Mark Stoneman (2006–2016)
- Scott Styris (2007)
- Marc Symington (1997–2002)

== T ==
- Tahir Mughal (2004)
- Shaun Tait (2004)
- Ross Taylor (2010)
- Callum Thorp (2005–2013)
- Ashley Thorpe (2002–2003)
- Raymond Toole (2023)
- Liam Trevaskis (2017–2023)
- Ashton Turner (2022–2024)
- Mark Turner (2005–2006)
- Andrew Tye (2022)

== U ==
- Usman Arshad (2013–2016)
- Uzair Mahomed (2008)

== V ==
- Paul van Meekeren (2021)

== W ==
- Neil Wagner (2024–2025)
- Alan Walker (1994–2004)
- David Warner (2009)
- Bradley-John Watling (2019)
- James Weighell (2015–2019)
- Vince Wells (2003)
- Robin Weston (1991–1997)
- Ben Whitehead (2018–2019)
- Gary Wigham (1991–1993)
- Brad Williams (2005)
- Paul Wiseman (2006–2008)
- John Wood (1991–2000)
- Mark Wood (2011–2021)

== Y ==
- Will Young (2021)
- Codi Yusuf (2025)

== See also ==
- List of Durham cricket captains
