= List of Durham cricket captains =

Durham County Cricket Club was officially founded on 23 May 1882. Durham's team was elevated to first-class status in 1992 when the club joined the County Championship. It is one of eighteen county teams in England and Wales that play first-class cricket. The player appointed club captain leads the team in all fixtures except if unavailable.

- A. A. W. Mewburn (1882–1885)
- J. A. Pease (1886–1891)
- A. B. Crosby (1892)
- W. F. Whitwell (1893–1896)
- R. H. Mallett (1897)
- R. Bousfield (1898)
- J. F. Whitwell (1899–1902)
- E. W. Elliot (1903–1906)
- T. Coulson (1907–1911)
- C. Y. Adamson (1912)
- E. B. Proud (1913–1919)
- T. Kinch (1920–1923)
- H. Brooks (1924–1928)
- H. C. Ferens (1929–1931)
- T. K. Dobson (1932–1936)
- D. C. H. Townsend (1937–1947)
- R. B. Proud (1947–1955)
- D. W. Hardy (1955–1967)
- H. J. Bailey (1968–1971)
- R. Inglis (1972)
- B. R. Lander (1973–1979)
- N. A. Riddell (1980–1991)
- D. A. Graveney (1992–1993)
- P. Bainbridge (1994)
- M. A. Roseberry (1995–1996)
- D. C. Boon (1997–1999)
- N. J. Speak (2000)
- J. J. B. Lewis (2001–2004)
- M. E. K. Hussey (2005)
- D. M. Benkenstein (2006–2008)
- W. R. Smith (2009–2010)
- P. Mustard (2011–2012)
- P. D. Collingwood (2013–2018)
- C. T. Bancroft (2019)
- E. J. H. Eckersley (2020)
- S. G. Borthwick (2021 to 2024)
- A. Lees (2024 to date)

== See also ==
- List of Durham CCC players
