= 2007 Friends Provident Trophy =

- Administrator: England and Wales Cricket Board
- Cricket format: Limited overs cricket (50 overs)
- Tournament format(s): Group stage and knockout
- Champions: Durham (1st title)
- Participants: 20
- Matches: 78 (+15 no results)
- Most runs: Phil Mustard (484 for Durham)
- Most wickets: Ottis Gibson (22 for Durham)
- Official website: Friends Provident cricket

The 2007 Friends Provident Trophy was an English county cricket tournament, held between 22 April and 19 August 2007. The tournament was won by Durham.

== Changes from previous tournament ==
Following the 2006 Cheltenham & Gloucester Trophy, which had been won by Sussex, various changes were made to the tournament. The first of these to be announced was the inclusion of a semi-final stage in 2007, following complaints of there being "too many meaningless matches". Another change was that of the competition sponsor; Cheltenham & Gloucester, who were reportedly unhappy at the format for 2006, cancelled their future sponsorship before the 2006 season began. Friends Provident were revealed as the new sponsors on 8 February 2007.

The final major change from 2006 was the introduction of player referrals. Introduced on a trial basis, the fielding captain or batsman involved had the right to refer decisions to the third umpire if they disagreed with the decision of the on-field umpires. Each team were permitted two appeals per innings, losing an appeal should the third umpire concur with his on-field colleague. However, this option was only available during televised matches, which led some to suggest it would favour some teams over others.

== Format ==
The eighteen first-class counties were joined by the Scottish and Irish national teams and divided into two groups, north and south. Each team played each other once, with the top two teams from each group progressing to the semi-final stage. During the group stage, teams were awarded two points for a win, one point for a tie, abandonment or a no result, with no points awarded for a defeat. Teams level on points at the end of the group stage were separated by most wins, followed by net run rate, followed by most wickets taken per balls bowled in matches achieving a result.

== Group stage ==
=== North Conference ===
| Team | Pld | W | T | L | NR | Pts | NRR |
|---|---|---|---|---|---|---|---|
| Durham Dynamos | 9 | 7 | 0 | 2 | 0 | 14 | +0.865 |
| Warwickshire Bears | 9 | 6 | 0 | 1 | 2 | 14 | +0.711 |
| Nottinghamshire Outlaws | 9 | 6 | 0 | 2 | 1 | 13 | +0.802 |
| Worcestershire Royals | 9 | 4 | 0 | 3 | 2 | 10 | +0.207 |
| Yorkshire Carnegie | 9 | 4 | 0 | 3 | 2 | 10 | +0.086 |
| Leicestershire Foxes | 9 | 4 | 0 | 3 | 2 | 10 | -0.313 |
| Lancashire Lightning | 9 | 3 | 0 | 5 | 1 | 7 | -0.629 |
| Derbyshire Phantoms | 9 | 2 | 0 | 6 | 1 | 5 | -0.246 |
| Northamptonshire Steelbacks | 9 | 1 | 0 | 6 | 2 | 4 | -0.728 |
| Scotland | 9 | 1 | 0 | 7 | 1 | 3 | -1.051 |

=== South Conference ===
| Team | Pld | W | T | L | NR | Pts | NRR |
|---|---|---|---|---|---|---|---|
| Hampshire Hawks | 9 | 6 | 1 | 1 | 1 | 14 | +0.315 |
| Essex Eagles | 9 | 6 | 0 | 2 | 1 | 13 | +1.050 |
| Gloucestershire Gladiators | 9 | 6 | 0 | 2 | 1 | 13 | +0.125 |
| Kent Spitfires | 9 | 5 | 0 | 3 | 1 | 11 | +0.889 |
| Surrey Brown Caps | 9 | 4 | 0 | 3 | 2 | 10 | +0.779 |
| Somerset Sabres | 9 | 4 | 1 | 3 | 1 | 10 | +0.198 |
| Middlesex Crusaders | 9 | 3 | 0 | 5 | 1 | 7 | -0.377 |
| Sussex Sharks | 9 | 2 | 0 | 5 | 2 | 6 | -0.687 |
| Glamorgan Dragons | 9 | 0 | 0 | 6 | 3 | 3 | -1.416 |
| Ireland | 9 | 0 | 0 | 6 | 3 | 3 | -1.793 |

== Knockout stage ==
=== Semi finals ===
20 June 2007

| Essex Eagles; 71 all out (22.1 overs) | v | Durham Dynamos; 72 for 7 (19 overs) |
| Andy Bichel 24 (35); Liam Plunkett 4/15 (4.1) | | Liam Plunkett 30* (35); Andy Bichel 4/22 (7) |

Durham Dynamos won by 3 wickets
Riverside Ground, Chester-le-Street
Umpires: John Holder and Jeremy Lloyds
Player of the match: Liam Plunkett (Durham)

- Start was delayed by 85 minutes due to overnight rain

Durham came out the victors in a low-scoring encounter where both teams collapsed to 38–7. Heavy rain had fallen over the course of the previous few days and overnight, creating a damp pitch offering "enough movement for the ball to find the edge or earn lbws". Andy Bichel was the only batsman to make a significant score (24 runs from 35 balls faced), as Neil Killeen and Ottis Gibson took three wickets each before Liam Plunkett claimed career-best bowling figures of 4 for 15.

Chasing a small target, Durham also lost early wickets, as Bichel and the on-loan Martin Saggers, followed by Graham Napier, reduced them to 38–7. This brought Plunkett to the crease, and, batting "sensibly rather than desperately", he hit 30 of the remaining 34 runs to win the match.

20 June 2007

| Hampshire Hawks; 206 for 7 (50 overs) | v | Warwickshire Bears; 166 all out (43.3 overs) |
| John Crawley 65 (89); Dale Steyn 2/31 (9) | | Kumar Sangakkara 44 (75); Stuart Clark 3/38 (9.3) |

Hampshire Hawks won by 40 runs
Rose Bowl, Southampton
Umpires: Peter Hartley and Neil Mallender
Player of the match: John Crawley (Hampshire)

Warwickshire elected not to include Ian Bell in their line-up, opting instead not to disrupt the team that had got to the semi-final. Hampshire, however, did select Kevin Pietersen, who was flown to Southampton on a chartered helicopter following England's Test match win over the West Indies.

Hampshire won the toss and chose to bat first, but started slowly, with John Crawley playing an anchor role following the early wickets of Michael Carberry and Michael Lumb. He was the key batsman on what was described as a "sluggish" pitch, and scored 64 before being narrowly run out by Heath Streak's throw from third man. In reply, Warwickshire seemed on course for victory at 98–3, before Sean Ervine dismissed top-scorer Kumar Sangakkara and Alex Loudon in the same over. Despite a battling innings from Tim Ambrose, Warwickshire never recovered, bowled out for 166.

=== Final ===
18–19 August 2007

| Durham Dynamos; 312 for 5 (50 overs) | v | Hampshire Hawks; 187 all out (41 overs) |
| Shivnarine Chanderpaul 78 (79); Daren Powell 2/80 (10) | | John Crawley 68 (93); Ottis Gibson 3/24 (8) |

Durham Dynamos won by 125 runs
Lord's Cricket Ground, London
Umpires: Nigel Llong and George Sharp
Player of the match: Ottis Gibson (Durham)

- Reserve day used

Durham's preparations for the final were hampered by the news that Steve Harmison would be unable to play after sustaining a muscle tear in his back in a County Championship match against Surrey. Hampshire were without Stuart Clark, whose two month contract had expired; Daren Powell was his replacement.

Durham batted first and scored 312–5, with Shivnarine Chanderpaul top-scoring with 78 before being run out by a "magnificent throw from long-on" by Michael Carberry. Hampshire's bowling was poor, with their six-man bowling attack of Powell, Jamie Bruce, Dimitri Mascarenhas, Sean Ervine, Chris Tremlett and Shane Warne "struggling [sic] for consistency". Phil Mustard and Kyle Coetzer joined Chanderpaul in scoring half-centuries for Durham, in what was the highest 50-overs total in domestic Lord's finals.

Hampshire's reply started badly; with the opening two deliveries of the innings, Ottis Gibson "slanted successive balls across Lumb and Ervine" to get both left-handers to edge to Michael Di Venuto at second slip. Hampshire's chase was "in tatters" when Kevin Pietersen was dismissed, and once John Crawley's 68 was ended by Paul Collingwood, Durham had effectively won. Rain stopped play with Hampshire on 158–5, ensuring the two teams would have to return the following day to complete the match. Upon resuming, Durham required less than nine overs to take the final five wickets.

Durham's win brought their first domestic trophy since becoming a first-class county in 1992, and left Glamorgan and Leicestershire as the only counties to have never won the tournament in one of its various guises.
