= Gurjit =

Gurjit is a given name. Notable people with the given name include:

- Gurjit Kaur (born 1995), Indian field hockey player
- Gurjit Sandhu (born 1992), British cricketer
- Gurjit Singh, Fijian football manager
- Gurjit Singh, Indian diplomat
