= James Cornford =

James Cornford may refer to:

- Jim Cornford (1911–1985), English cricketer
- James Cornford (cricketer, born 1978), English cricketer
