= Ramanpreet Singh =

English cricketer

Personal information
- Full name: Ramanpreet Singh
- Born: 19 February 1993 (age 33); Newcastle upon Tyne, Tyne and Wear, England
- Nickname: Rammy
- Batting: Right-handed
- Bowling: Right-arm off break
- Role: Occasional wicket-keeper

Domestic team information
- Years: Team
- 2012–2014: Durham
- 2009–present: Northumberland

Career statistics
Competition	First-class
Matches	1
Runs scored	34
Batting average	17.00
100s/50s	–/–
Top score	22
Balls bowled	–
Wickets	–
Bowling average	–
5 wickets in innings	–
10 wickets in match	–
Best bowling	–
Catches/stumpings	–/–
- Source: Cricinfo, 2 August 2012

Ramanpreet Singh (born 19 January 1993) is an English cricketer. Singh is a right-handed top-order batsman who bowls right-arm off break. He was born at Newcastle upon Tyne and was educated at Gosforth Academy.

Singh made his debut in minor counties cricket for Northumberland against Cumberland in the 2009 Minor Counties Championship at Osborne Avenue, Jesmond. While part of Durham's cricket academy, Singh was selected to play for England Under-19s on their tour against Sri Lanka Under-19s in January 2011. He made four Youth One Day Internationals (YODIs) during the tour, before playing a further four YODIs against the same opposition during their tour to England in July of that year. He later made six YODIs against Bangladesh Under-19s during England Under-19s tour there in January 2012. In April 2012, he made three YODI appearances in a quadrangular tournament in Australia, making appearances against Australia Under-19s, India Under-19s and New Zealand Under-19s. He was named in England's preliminary thirty man squad for the 2012 ICC Under-19 World Cup, but was not selected in the final fifteen man squad.

During the 2012 season, Singh played his first match for Northumberland since his debut in 2009, making an MCCA Knockout Trophy appearance against Cambridgeshire. He made his first-class debut for Durham against the touring Australia A team at the Riverside Ground. Opening the batting with stand-in captain Mark Stoneman, Singh scored 22 runs in Durham's first-innings, before being dismissed by Alister McDermott, while in Durham's second-innings he was dismissed for 12 by the same bowler.
