= James Cornford (cricketer, born 1978) =

English former first-class cricketer (born 1978)

Personal information
- Full name: James Michael Cornford
- Born: 6 September 1978 (age 48); Crewe, Cheshire, England
- Batting: Right-handed
- Bowling: Right-arm medium-fast Leg break

Domestic team information
- Years: Team
- 1999–2001: Cheshire
- 2001/02–2002/03: Midlands
- 2002: Worcestershire Cricket Board

Career statistics
Competition	First-class	List A
Matches	5	2
Runs scored	314	21
Batting average	78.50	10.50
100s/50s	–/3	–/–
Top score	98*	19
Balls bowled	210	0
Wickets	5	–
Bowling average	23.00	–
5 wickets in innings	–	–
10 wickets in match	–	–
Best bowling	2/36	–
Catches/stumpings	10/–	2/–
- Source: Cricinfo, 26 February 2019

James Michael Cornford (born 6 September 1978) is an English former first-class cricketer.

The son of an antiques restorer, Cornford was born in Crewe. After completing his secondary education, Cornford attended Reaseheath College where he studied golf course and green management. Having found himself unemployed six months after leaving Reaseheath College, Cornford took a loan of £3,000 from The Prince's Trust to start his own cricket bat making business, which by 2000 counted Keith Semple and Muazam Ali as clients.

He made his debut in minor counties cricket for Cheshire in the 1999 Minor Counties Championship against Devon. He made five appearances in 1999 and nine in 2000. Cornford also made six appearances for Cheshire in the 2000 MCCA Knockout Trophy, and one appearance in the 2001 MCCA Knockout Trophy. He travelled to Zimbabwe in March 2002 to play for the Midlands cricket team, making his debut in first-class cricket in the 2001–02 Logan Cup against Matabeleland. He made four further appearances during the competition, ending as Midlands' leading run-scorer for the season with 314 runs. Returning to England, Cornford played one match for the Worcestershire Cricket Board in the 2002 MCCA Knockout Trophy, before returning to Zimbabwe to play List A one-day cricket for Midlands in the 2002–03 Faithwear Inter-Provincial One-Day Series, making two appearances against Matabeleland and Mashonaland.

By 2009, his cricket equipment business was supplying the England cricket team and the Australia national cricket team with training aids.
