= Josh Coughlin =

English cricketer (born 1997)

Personal information
- Born: 29 September 1997 (age 29); Sunderland, Tyne and Wear, England
- Batting: Left-handed
- Bowling: Right-arm medium
- Role: Bowler
- Relatives: Paul Coughlin (brother)

Domestic team information
- Years: Team
- 2016–2020: Durham (squad no. 29)
- FC debut: 26 June 2016 Durham v Sri Lanka A

Career statistics
Competition	First-class
Matches	4
Runs scored	66
Batting average	11.00
100s/50s	0/0
Top score	24
Balls bowled	492
Wickets	7
Bowling average	35.85
5 wickets in innings	0
10 wickets in match	0
Best bowling	2/31
Catches/stumpings	1/–
- Source: CricketArchive, 9 June 2019

Josh Coughlin (born 29 September 1997) is an English cricketer. He made his first-class debut on 26 June 2016 for Durham against a touring Sri Lanka A side. Coughlin was released by Durham ahead of the 2021 County Championship.
