= Ben Whitehead (cricketer) =

English cricketer (born 1997)

Personal information
- Full name: Benjamin Guy Whitehead
- Born: 28 April 1997 (age 29); Sunderland, Tyne and Wear, England
- Batting: Right-handed
- Bowling: Right-arm leg break
- Role: Bowler

Domestic team information
- Years: Team
- 2018–2020: Durham (squad no. 97)
- T20 debut: 3 August 2018 Durham v Worcestershire

Career statistics
Competition	T20
Matches	6
Runs scored	2
Batting average	–
100s/50s	0/0
Top score	2*
Balls bowled	120
Wickets	5
Bowling average	28.80
5 wickets in innings	0
10 wickets in match	0
Best bowling	2/23
Catches/stumpings	3/–
- Source: Cricinfo, 27 September 2018

Benjamin Guy Whitehead (born 28 April 1997) is an English cricketer. He made his Twenty20 debut for Durham in the 2018 t20 Blast on 3 August 2018.
