= Ryan Robinson (cricketer) =

English cricketer (born 1976)

Personal information
- Full name: Ryan Robinson
- Born: 19 October 1976 (age 50); Huddersfield, Yorkshire, England
- Batting: Right-handed
- Bowling: Right-arm medium

Domestic team information
- Years: Team
- 1998: Yorkshire Cricket Board
- 1999–2000: Durham

Career statistics
| Competition | List A |
|---|---|
| Matches | 16 |
| Runs scored | 159 |
| Batting average | 10.60 |
| 100s/50s | 0/1 |
| Top score | 68 |
| Balls bowled | 289 |
| Wickets | 5 |
| Bowling average | 48.80 |
| 5 wickets in innings | 0 |
| 10 wickets in match | 0 |
| Best bowling | 2/22 |
| Catches/stumpings | 3/– |
- Source: Cricinfo, 7 September 2011

Ryan Robinson (born 19 October 1976) is a former English cricketer. Robinson was a right-handed batsman who bowled right-arm medium pace. He was born in Huddersfield, Yorkshire.

Having played for the Yorkshire seconds since 1994, Robinson went on to play three matches for the Yorkshire Cricket Board in the 1998 MCCA Knockout Trophy. He joined Durham for the 1999 season, making his debut for the county in a List A match against Middlesex in the CGU National League. He made fifteen further appearances for the county, all of them List A appearances, the last of which came against Hampshire in the 2000 Norwich Union National League. In his sixteen List A appearances, he scored 159 runs at an average of 10.60, with a high score of 68. This score, his only fifty, came against Derbyshire in 2000. With the ball, he took 5 wickets at a bowling average of 48.80, with best figures of 2/22.

He has also played for a number of other county second XIs.
