= Steve Lugsden =

English cricketer

Personal information
- Full name: Steven Lugsden
- Born: 10 July 1976 (age 50); Gateshead, County Durham, England
- Batting: Right-handed
- Bowling: Right-arm fast-medium

Domestic team information
- Years: Team
- 1993–1998: Durham
- 1999: Hampshire (squad no. 16)

Career statistics
Competition	First-class	List A
Matches	15	1
Runs scored	70	–
Batting average	5.38	–
100s/50s	–/–	–/–
Top score	16	–
Balls bowled	2,058	48
Wickets	29	1
Bowling average	45.96	55.00
5 wickets in innings	–	–
10 wickets in match	–	–
Best bowling	3/45	1/55
Catches/stumpings	2–	–/–
- Source: Cricinfo, 7 December 2009

Steven Lugsden (born 10 July 1976) is an English former first-class cricketer who played for Durham and Hampshire.

Lugsden was born at Gateshead in July 1976, and was educated at St Edmund Campion Roman Catholic Secondary. Considered one of the fastest bowlers in England, Lugsden made his debut in first-class cricket for Durham, then in their second season with first-class status, against Derbyshire at Durham in the 1993 County Championship. In 1994, he played for the England under-19 cricket team, playing in the Youth 'Test' series against India Under-19s. During the 1994 season, he also made four appearances for Durham in the County Championship, and played against the touring South Africans. He also made what would be his only appearance in List A one-day cricket, when he played against Leicestershire in the Axa Equity & Law League, with him taking the wicket of Paul Nixon. Lugsden missed the 1995 season with a stress facture to his back, one of a number of injuries throughout the season which saw Durham use 24 players. He resumed playing in 1996, when he made three appearances in County Championship, and in the 1997 County Championship he played just once against Worcestershire. His final season with Durham came in 1998, when he made three County Championship appearances. For Durham, he took 25 first-class wickets at an average of 46.88, with best figures of 3 for 45.

Lugsden was released by Durham at the end of the 1998 season, and was subsequently signed on a one-year contract by Hampshire ahead of the 1999 season. However, he made just two first-class appearances for Hampshire in 1999 against Oxford University and the touring New Zealanders, and was released by Hampshire at the end of that season, alongside Thomas Hansen and Matthew Keech. Returning to the North East of England, Lugsden played club cricket for Gateshead Fell Cricket Club.
