= Sneyd Green =

Area in Stoke-on-Trent, Staffordshire, England

Sneyd Green is an area in the city of Stoke-on-Trent, Staffordshire, England, in the north-east of the city, 1.5 miles (2.4 km) from Hanley. Sneyd Green borders Smallthorne in the north, Milton in the east, Birches Head in the south, and Cobridge in the west.

Most of Sneyd Green falls within Stoke-on-Trent North, the remainder is in Stoke Central. For local government purposes the greater part of Sneyd Green is in the East Valley electoral ward. Those parts not in East Valley are split between Northwood & Birches Head and Burslem South. That part of Sneyd Green that falls within Burslem South is sometimes referred to as Old Sneyd Green.

== Community profile and facilities ==
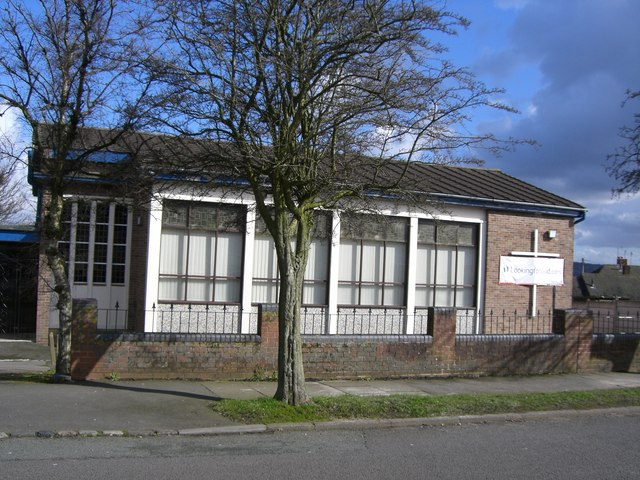
Wesley Hall

Despite having a sizeable council estate, Sneyd Green only has an average number of council tenants for a neighbourhood in Stoke-on-Trent. Also, Sneyd Green has a significantly below average proportion of residents in terraced housing. According to the Council's 'Neighbourhood Area Profile', Sneyd Green is "typified by privately owned semi-detached housing and pockets of semi-detached council-housing". Predictably, the average gross household income of Sneyd Green residents is higher than the City's average and the crime rate is below the City average.

The hub of the community is around the crossroad junction of Hanley Road (B5049), Milton Road and Sneyd Street. Here can be found: a busy ‘Late Shop’ convenience store (A Consumers' cooperative), a doctor's surgery – now closed, a dentist, a chemist, a sub-post office, a small number of other shops, a Chinese take-away, and an Oatcake shop.

Sneyd Green's community hall on Noblett Road was one of only twelve council-owned, community-run halls in the city. Today, many of these Halls, including Sneyd Green's, are social enterprises owned by a local Trust. The Holden Lane Residents Association is one of a sizeable number of voluntary bodies that utilise the hall's facilities.

Sneyd Green has two primary schools (Holden Lane and Sneyd Green), a large secondary school (Excel Academy) and two churches (St. Andrews Church of England Parish and Wesley Hall Methodist Church on Noblett Road).

There are two public houses in Sneyd Green (the Berwick and the Sneyd Arms – a third, the Holden Bridge being recently demolished). There was also a Workingmen's Club that was demolished in 2023 following arson damage in 2021 (Holden Lane WMC on Ralph Drive – member of the Working Men's Club and Institute Union ).

== Central Forest Park ==
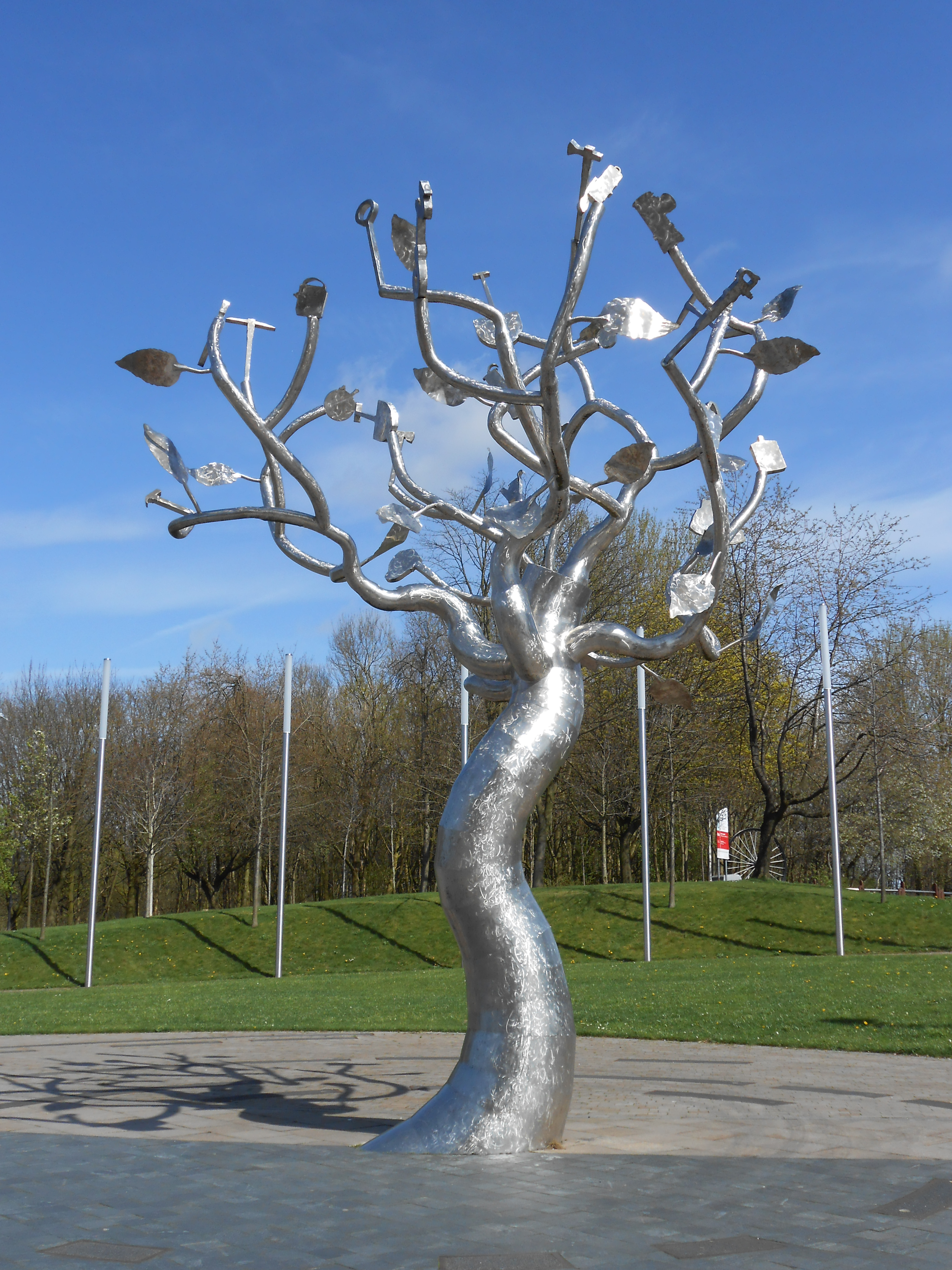
Sculpture in Central Forest Park: "Tree Stories" by Denis O'Connor

The huge Central Forest Park can be found on the south-west fringe of Sneyd Green. In the early 1970s Central Forest Park was created by the City Council from three enormous coal spoil heaps, deep mine shafts, water-filled marl pits, disused railways and decaying buildings. At the time it won conservation awards for land reclamation. Today it is a very pleasant park allowing for a variety of recreational pastimes including angling, cycling, and skate-boarding.

== Holden Lane Pools ==
The Holden Lane Pools is a local nature reserve covering an area of eight and a half hectares. There is young woodland, marshy reed beds, grassland and the main pool, popular with anglers, covers approximately four acres of water and is tree lined around most of its perimeter. The Ford Green Brook, a tributary of the River Trent, flows through a conservation area where angling is not permitted. Some remains of a disused branch of the Caldon Canal (‘The Foxley') can also be found on the site. There is also a footpath, along the trackbed of the former Biddulph Valley railway line (of the North Staffordshire Railway), to Ford Green Hall.

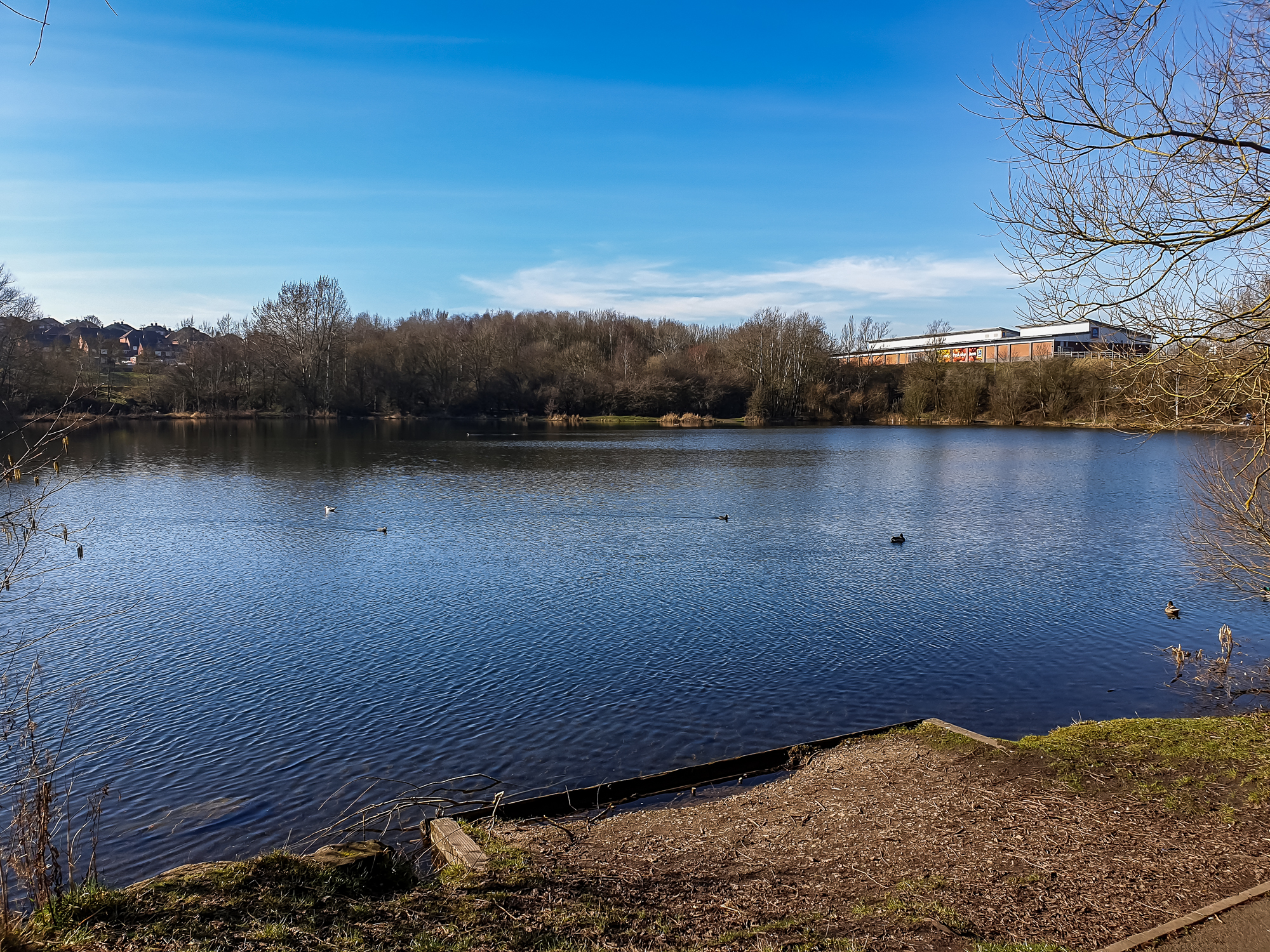
Holden Lane pool

The Pools can be found in the north-east of Sneyd Green, nestled between the A53 on one side and Holden Lane High School on the other. The main Hanley to Leek bus service passes the site.

The Friends of Holden Lane Pools were established in January 2004. They work with the City Council's Environment Team to manage the site for wildlife and people. According to the Environment team, the site currently supports "a wide variety of birds including great crested and little grebes, swans, coots and moorhens. A range of small birds can be seen in the woodland and reed beds. Other wildlife includes grass snakes, which shelter and hunt for frogs in the grassland and marshy areas, plus dragonflies and butterflies".

Anglers come seeking one of the several carp over 25 lb (11 kg) that the main pool holds.

== Trivia ==
Leek New Road, which goes through Sneyd Green passing under the Holden Viaduct, forms part of the A53 that stretches from Shrewsbury (Shropshire) to Buxton (Derbyshire) via Newcastle-under-Lyme, Stoke-on-Trent, and Leek. In the Pennines, the A52 reaches an altitude of over 1,500 feet (460 m) above sea level. Not surprisingly, the road is often blocked by snow in the winter. In better weather, keen ramblers and campers from all over North Staffordshire pass through Sneyd Green in their cars on their way to the Peak District.

Sneyd Green is named after the prominent local Sneyd family. Keele University was built on the former estate of the Sneyd family. There are a number of prominent historical Sneyds of Keele Hall, such as Ralph Sneyd and William Sneyd. There are number of pubs in the area called the Sneyd Arms.

== Notable residents ==
- Phil Bainbridge – cricketer.
- George Eastham – when a player at Stoke City, he lived in the large detached house to the rear of the Sneyd Arms public house.
- Tom Pope – professional footballer with Crewe Alexandra, Rotherham United and Port Vale; nicknamed the "Sneyd Green Sniper".
- AJ Pritchard – dancer, choreographer, vlogger.
