= Holden Viaduct =

Coordinates: 53°2.6180′N 2°10.3429′W

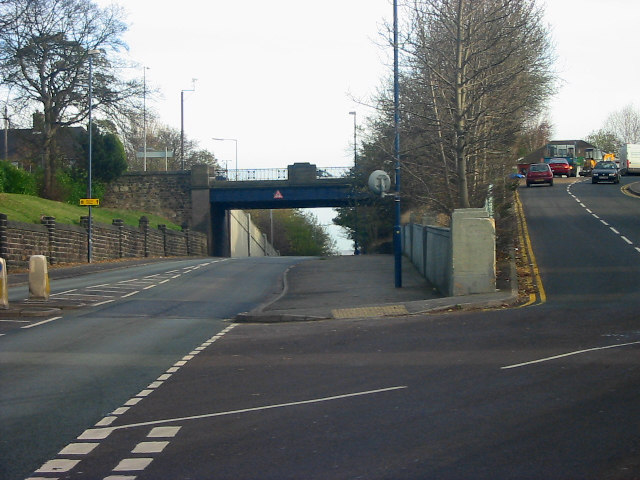
Holden Viaduct, seen from the south-west

Holden Viaduct, in Sneyd Green, Stoke-on-Trent, carries the A5272, here called Hanley Road. It spans a cutting through which runs Leek New Road, the A53. On each side of the viaduct is a ramp leading down to the A53.

Although it is officially a viaduct, it is quite short and has only one span. It is usually known as "Holden Bridge". It is a notable feature for motorists travelling along Leek New Road, which is perfectly straight here.

A plaque on the balustrade reads: City of Stoke-on-Trent, Holden Viaduct. This bridge was opened by Mrs J W Oakes on the 14th July 1930, and was erected to replace the original structure built in 1844. Major J Kent DSO Chairman, Councillor J W Oakes Vice-Chairman, Highways Committee.

A short way north-east along Leek New Road, at the junction with Berwick Road, there was until recently a pub called The Holden Bridge; it closed in 2007, and has since been demolished.

== History ==
The Leek New Road, which runs in an almost straight line between Endon and Cobridge, first appeared on the one-inch Ordnance Survey maps in the 1850s, so the road and bridge may have been parts of the same building project. As the plaque on the bridge tells us, the present bridge was opened in 1930, replacing the previous structure built in 1844. There were a number of improvements made to what is now the A53 between Stoke and Leek in the 1920s, the current Holden Viaduct being one.

Holden was the name of a farm in this part of Sneyd Green, which had been in existence since at least 1611. In the late nineteenth century the bridge was known as Holden Hill Viaduct.
