= Gary Wigham =

English cricketer

Personal information
- Full name: Gary Wigham
- Born: 2 March 1973 (age 53); Bishop Auckland, County Durham, England
- Batting: Right-handed
- Bowling: Right-arm medium-fast

Domestic team information
- Years: Team
- 1991–1992: Durham

Career statistics
Competition	List A
Matches	1
Runs scored	–
Batting average	–
100s/50s	–/–
Top score	–
Balls bowled	48
Wickets	1
Bowling average	43.00
5 wickets in innings	–
10 wickets in match	–
Best bowling	1/43
Catches/stumpings	–/–
- Source: Cricinfo, 12 August 2011

Gary Wigham (born 27 May 1961) is a former English cricketer. Wigham was a left-handed batsman who bowled right-arm off break. He was born in Seaham, County Durham.

Wigham played Minor counties cricket for Durham in 1991, making a single appearance in the Minor Counties Championship against Hertfordshire. Durham were granted first-class status at the end of the 1991 season. Unlike many players, Wigham was retained by the county, but went on to make just a single List A appearance against Essex in the Sunday League. He didn't bat in this match, but with the ball he took the wicket of John Stephenson for the cost of 43 runs from 8 overs.
