= Muazam Ali =

English cricketer

- Born: 23 October 1979 (age 46); Leytonstone, England, United Kingdom
- Occupation: First-class cricketer

Muazam Ali (born 23 October 1979) is a British former first-class cricketer. He was a right-handed batsman and leg-break bowler who played for Durham between 1999 and 2000. He was born in Leytonstone. He is of Pakistani origin.

Ali made his debut for Durham in List A cricket during the 1999 season, having played Second XI cricket since 1997, for the second elevens of Durham and Essex. Ali participated in the County Championship during 2000, however, with an average of just 5 runs, he was cut from the first team as Durham were relegated to Division Two.

Ali was a middle-order batsman during his season of cricket.

Muazam Ali (born 23 October 1979) is a British cricketer and at youth level he was one of the most prolific scorers, he was also awarded not once but twice with the MCC Lords Taverners Award.

He was a right-handed batsman and leg-break bowler who played for Durham between 1998 and 2000.

Ali was brought to Durham by the legendary Graham Gooch in 1999 when he was the batting coach. There was very high expectations on him with people such as Gooch and Clive Radley (MCC Head Coach) particularly championing his credentials and ability. He was born in Whipps Cross, London.

Ali made his debut for Durham in List A cricket during the 1999 season, having played Second XI cricket since 1995, for the second elevens of Durham and Essex. Ali participated in the County Championship during 2000, however, he was released from the first team as Durham were relegated to Division Two and decided to seek pastures new.

Ali was a middle-order batsman during his professional cricket career. However, in one-day cricket he did open the batting and had a better run of luck.
