= Paul Coughlin =

English cricketer (born 1992)

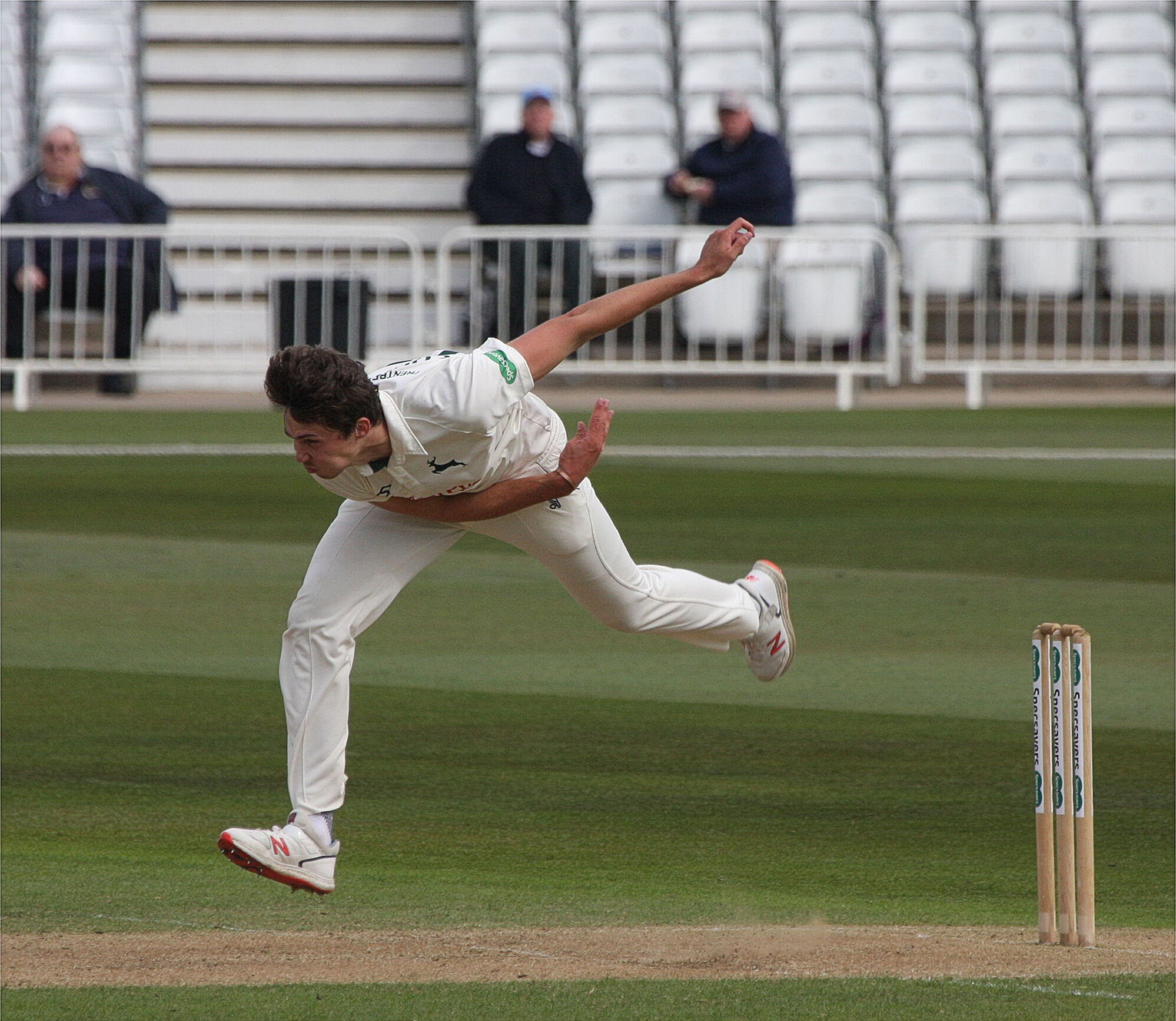
- Coughlin in 2019

Personal information
- Born: 23 October 1992 (age 34); Sunderland, Tyne and Wear, England
- Batting: Right-handed
- Bowling: Right-arm medium
- Relatives: Josh Coughlin (brother)

Domestic team information
- Years: Team
- 2012–2017: Durham (squad no. 29)
- 2018–2019: Nottinghamshire (squad no. 29)
- 2020–2025: Durham (squad no. 23)
- 2026: Lancashire (squad no. 33)
- FC debut: 1 August 2012 Durham v Australia A
- LA debut: 27 August 2012 Durham v Hampshire

Career statistics
Competition	FC	LA	T20
Matches	70	45	72
Runs scored	2,264	453	862
Batting average	26.32	15.62	22.10
100s/50s	2/11	0/1	0/1
Top score	100*	77	53
Balls bowled	8,894	1,622	1,117
Wickets	154	38	71
Bowling average	33.72	39.60	25.46
5 wickets in innings	3	0	1
10 wickets in match	1	0	0
Best bowling	5/49	3/32	5/42
Catches/stumpings	34/–	14/–	25/–
- Source: CricketArchive, 21 June 2026

Paul Coughlin (born 23 October 1992) is an English cricketer. Coughlin is a right-handed batsman who bowls right-arm medium pace. He was born at Sunderland, County Durham, and was educated at St Robert of Newminster Catholic Comprehensive School.

Coughlin made his debut in minor counties cricket for Northumberland against Staffordshire in 2011 MCCA Knockout Trophy. He also made a single appearance in that seasons Minor Counties Championship against Staffordshire. During the 2012 season, Coughlin made his first-class debut for Durham against the touring Australia A team at the Riverside Ground. He ended Durham's first-innings of 197 all out unbeaten on 29, the second highest score of the innings. In the tourists first-innings of 159 all out, he took his maiden wicket, that of Michael Klinger. He was dismissed for 3 runs in Durham's second-innings of 185 all out by Jon Holland.

In September 2017, it was announced that Coughlin was leaving Durham at the end of 2017 season to join Nottinghamshire ahead of the 2018 season. In June 2022, in the 2022 County Championship, Coughlin scored his maiden century in first-class cricket, scoring 100 not out against Worcestershire.

In 2019, Coughlin married his long-term girlfriend, Gemma. In 2022, the couple announced the birth of their first son.
