= Archie Bailey =

English cricketer (born 2004)

Personal information
- Full name: Archie George Bailey
- Born: 28 June 2005 (age 21); Northampton, Northamptonshire, England
- Batting: Right-handed
- Bowling: Right arm medium
- Role: Bowler

Domestic team information
- Years: Team
- 2024–2025: Gloucestershire (squad no. 28)
- 2025: → Durham (on loan)
- 2026–: Durham (squad no. 6)
- FC debut: 9 September 2024 Gloucestershire v Middlesex
- LA debut: 13 August 2025 Durham v Middlesex

Career statistics
Competition	FC	LA
Matches	5	3
Runs scored	19	1
Batting average	–	1.00
100s/50s	0/0	0/0
Top score	19*	1
Balls bowled	552	144
Wickets	13	3
Bowling average	31.76	68.66
5 wickets in innings	0	0
10 wickets in match	0	0
Best bowling	4/30	2/83
Catches/stumpings	1/–	0/–
- Source: Cricinfo, 24 August 2025

Archie George Bailey (born 28 June 2005) is an English cricketer who plays for Gloucestershire County Cricket Club. He is a right-handed batsman and right arm medium pace bowler.

== Career ==
Bailey signed a two-year rookie contract with Gloucestershire County Cricket Club in November 2023. He made his first-class debut for Gloucestershire in the 2024 County Championship against Middlesex on 9 September 2024, taking 4/30 in the second innings.

In August 2025, Bailey signed a three-year contract with Durham ahead of the 2026 season.
