= Gurjit Sandhu =

English cricketer

Gurjit "Gurjie" Sandhu
Personal information
- Full name: Gurjit Singh Sandhu
- Born: 24 March 1992 (age 34); London, England
- Batting: Right-handed
- Bowling: Left-arm medium-fast

Domestic team information
- Years: Team
- 2011–2015: Middlesex
- 2016: Durham
- 2016: Hertfordshire
- 2017: Shropshire
- 2017: Derbyshire

Career statistics
| Competition | FC | LA | T20 |
|---|---|---|---|
| Matches | 7 | 4 | 9 |
| Runs scored | 76 | 3 | 3 |
| Batting average | 25.33 | 1.50 | – |
| 100s/50s | 0/0 | 0/0 | 0/0 |
| Top score | 46* | 3 | 2* |
| Balls bowled | 897 | 181 | 152 |
| Wickets | 14 | 8 | 8 |
| Bowling average | 39.14 | 21.25 | 28.25 |
| 5 wickets in innings | 0 | 0 | 0 |
| 10 wickets in match | 0 | 0 | 0 |
| Best bowling | 4/49 | 3/28 | 2/15 |
| Catches/stumpings | 0/– | 2/– | 1/– |
- Source: ESPNcricinfo, 14 April 2017

Gurjit "Gurjie" Singh Sandhu (born 24 March 1992) is an English cricketer, who formerly played for Middlesex. Sandhu is a right-handed batsman who bowls left-arm medium-fast. Born in Isleworth, Middlesex to Indian parents, Sandhu was educated at the Isleworth and Syon School. He has recently signed on to play at Strathmore cricket club.

Having played for the Middlesex Second XI since 2008, Sandhu made his first-class debut for Middlesex against the touring Sri Lankans at Uxbridge in 2011. He ended Middlesex's first-innings of 360/8 declared unbeaten on 7, while in the Sri Lankans first-innings of 309/2 declared he bowled 8 wicketless overs. Ajantha Mendis dismissed him for 8 runs in Middlesex's second-innings of 161, while in the Sri Lankans second-innings he bowled 5 wicketless overs. The Sri Lankans won the match by 4 wickets. He was released by Middlesex following the 2015 season.

He appeared for Durham versus Sri Lanka A in June 2016. He also appeared in minor counties cricket for Hertfordshire during 2016. He then debuted for another minor county, Shropshire, in April 2017. He returned to first-class cricket in July 2017, when he turned out for Derbyshire against Durham.
