= Daniel Hogg =

English cricketer (born 2004)

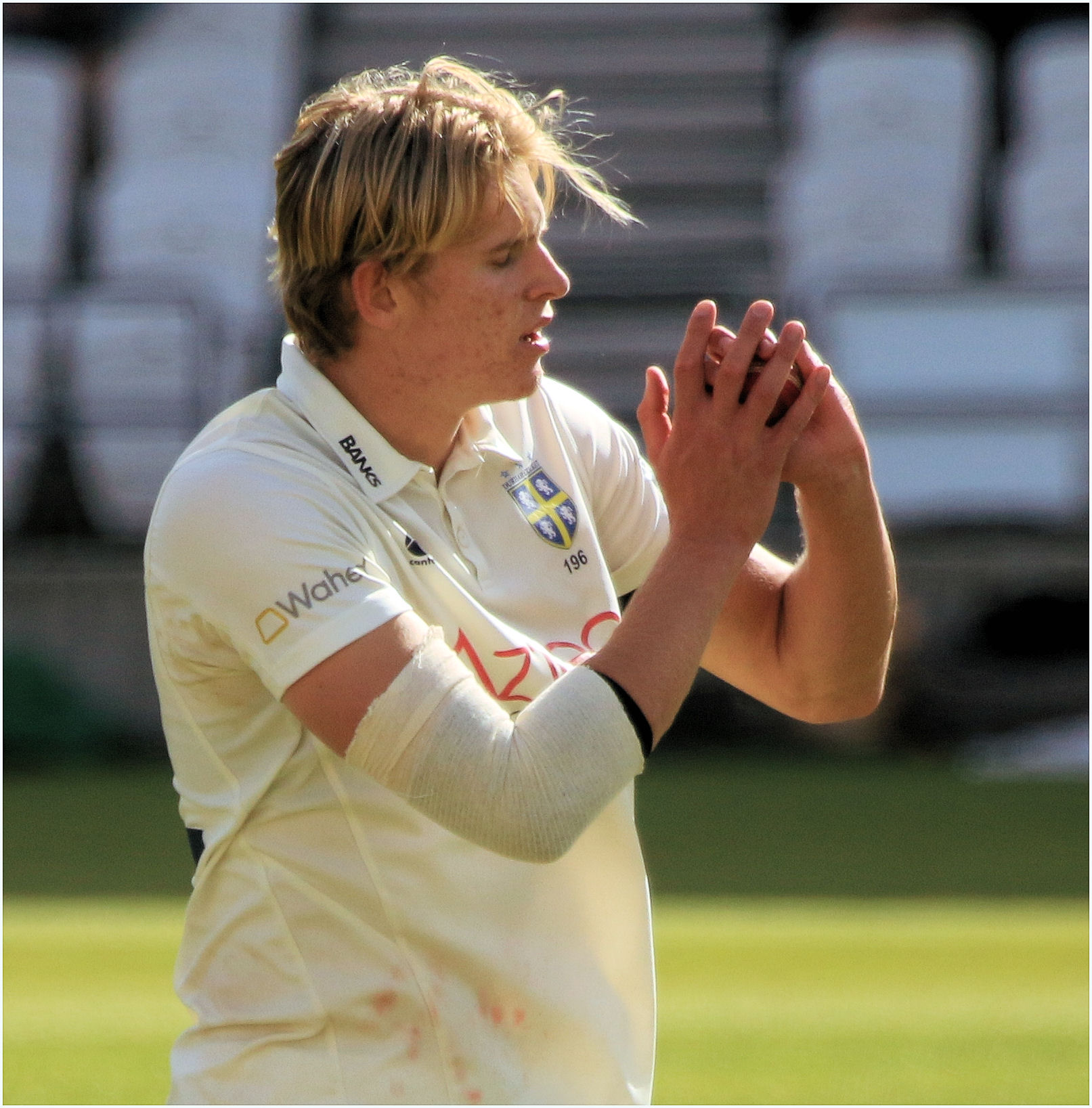
- Hogg in 2025

Personal information
- Full name: Daniel Maxwell Hogg
- Born: 19 December 2004 (age 21); Manchester, England
- Batting: Right-handed
- Bowling: Right-arm fast-medium
- Role: Bowler

Domestic team information
- Years: Team
- 2024–present: Durham (squad no. 22)
- First-class debut: 22 August 2024 Durham v Nottinghamshire
- List A debut: 31 July 2024 Durham v Somerset

Career statistics
Competition	First-class	List A
Matches	8	2
Runs scored	63	3
Batting average	9.00	–
100s/50s	0/0	0/0
Top score	18*	2*
Balls bowled	960	54
Wickets	17	1
Bowling average	37.88	32.00
5 wickets in innings	1	0
10 wickets in match	0	0
Best bowling	7/66	1/13
Catches/stumpings	2/–	0/–
- Source: ESPNcricinfo, 27 September 2025

Daniel Maxwell Hogg (born 19 December 2004) is an English cricketer who plays for Durham and the England national under-19 cricket team. He is a right handed batsman and right arm fast medium bowler. He made his List A cricket debut on 31 July 2024 in the One-Day Cup against Somerset. Hogg signed his first professional contract in December 2024, agreeing a three-year deal with Durham in December 2024.
