= Phil Bainbridge =

English cricketer (born 1958)

Philip Bainbridge
Personal information
- Full name: Philip Bainbridge,
- Born: 16 April 1958 (age 68); Sneyd Green, Stoke-on-Trent, England
- Batting: Right-handed
- Bowling: Right-arm medium
- Role: All-rounder

Domestic team information
- Years: Team
- 1977–1990: Gloucestershire
- 1992–1996: Durham

Career statistics
Competition	First-class	List A
Matches	324	311
Runs scored	15707	5559
Batting average	33.70	24.38
100s/50s	24/94	1/27
Top score	169	106*
Balls bowled	25746	12342
Wickets	349	293
Bowling average	37.51	31.64
5 wickets in innings	10	1
10 wickets in match	–	–
Best bowling	8/53	5/22
Catches/stumpings	149/–	72/–
- Source: Cricinfo, 11 May 2026

Philip Bainbridge, born on 16 April 1958 at Sneyd Green, Stoke-on-Trent, is a retired first-class cricketer who played for Gloucestershire and Durham.

A right-handed middle order batsman and a right-arm medium pace bowler, Bainbridge was a member of the Gloucestershire team throughout the 1980s, batting at number 5 or 6, and bowling medium pace seamers.

Bainbridge came into the Gloucestershire side in 1977, whilst studying to be a Teacher at Borough Road College, Isleworth and won a regular place in 1981. In that season, he passed 1,000 runs for the first time at an average of over 40 runs per innings and made the first of what would be 24 first-class centuries. He passed 1,000 runs in each of the next three seasons, but in 1985, he was moved up the batting order to No 4 and his batting moved up a notch. He made 1,644 runs at an average of more than 56 runs per innings as Gloucestershire rose from the bottom of the County Championship table to challenge for the title. Bainbridge was named as a Wisden Cricketer of the Year in 1986, but he had a less successful season and talk of him as a potential Test player subsided.

After four more years, Bainbridge retired from Gloucestershire after the 1990 season to go into business, and became involved in the marketing side of the development of Durham as a first-class county. Having missed the entire 1991 season, he played in most of Durham's first-class games in their two inaugural seasons and he topped both batting and bowling averages in 1993. He was then made captain for 1994, and the side finished 16th, the first time it had not been bottom in the County Championship. But Bainbridge's own form suffered, and he was replaced as captain for 1995 and retired finally from first-class cricket the following year.

As Durham captain Bainbridge inadvertently contributed to a piece of cricketing history in June 1994. As a match against Warwickshire at Birmingham entered its last day, lost time meant that the match was still in its first innings, Brian Lara at the crease for Warwickshire, and no result was likely without declarations agreed between Bainbridge and the home side's captain Dermot Reeve. "The presence of Lara allied to the excellent pitch gave Durham skipper Phil Bainbridge little incentive to enter into any negotiations, and so Warwickshire batted on", and by the end of the day Lara had racked up 501, the highest ever first-class individual score.
