= Haydon Mustard =

English cricketer

Personal information
- Full name: Haydon Samuel Mustard
- Born: 12 July 2006 (age 20); Newcastle upon Tyne, England
- Batting: Right-handed
- Role: Wicket-keeper
- Relatives: Phil Mustard (father)

Domestic team information
- Years: Team
- 2024–2025: Durham (squad no. 52)
- FC debut: 22 February 2024; Durham v Zimbabwe A
- LA debut: 24 July 2024 Durham v Lancashire

Career statistics
Competition	FC	LA	T20
Matches	2	9	7
Runs scored	10	176	57
Batting average	3.33	22.00	28.50
100s/50s	0/0	0/0	0/0
Top score	10	38	46*
Catches/stumpings	3/–	11/0	1/–
- Source: ESPNcricinfo, 24 August 2025

Haydon Samuel Mustard (born 12 July 2006) is an English cricketer who plays as a wicket keeper for Durham County Cricket Club and the England national under-19 cricket team. He is a right-handed batsman. He made his Durham T20 Blast debut on 7 June 2024, against Leicestershire.

== Early life ==
Mustard attended Newcastle School for Boys. He was awarded the Newcastle Sport Rising Star Award for cricket in November 2023.

== Career ==
Mustard was announced as having joined the Durham County Cricket Club academy in late 2021, ahead of the 2022 season. He made his T20 Blast debut for Durham on 7 June 2024, against Leicestershire. He made his One-Day Cup debut on 24 July 2024.

== International career ==
Mustard has represented the England national under-19 cricket team, making his debut against India U19 in November 2023. He was subsequently selected for the 2024 Under-19 Cricket World Cup. He retained his place in the England U19 team for their summer 2024 series against Sri Lanka U19.

== Personal life ==
He is the son of former England international wicket keeper Phil Mustard.
