= James Brinkley =

Scottish cricketer (born 1974)

Personal information
- Born: 13 March 1974 (age 52); Argyll and Bute, Scotland
- Batting: Right-handed
- Bowling: Right-arm fast-medium
- Role: Bowler

Career statistics
Competition	ODI
Matches	5
Runs scored	52
Batting average	10.40
100s/50s	0/0
Top score	23
Balls bowled	168
Wickets	2
Bowling average	58.50
5 wickets in innings	0
10 wickets in match	0
Best bowling	1/29
Catches/stumpings	1/–
- Source: ESPNcricinfo, 19 April 2007

James Brinkley (born 13 March 1974) is a Scottish former cricketer. He is a right-handed batsman and a right-arm medium-fast bowler. He played five One Day Internationals in May 1999. He played List A cricket until 2004 and participated in the 2001 ICC Trophy.

Brinkley was generally used as the opening bowler in the Scottish attack.
