= Ottis Gibson =

West Indian cricketer and Coach

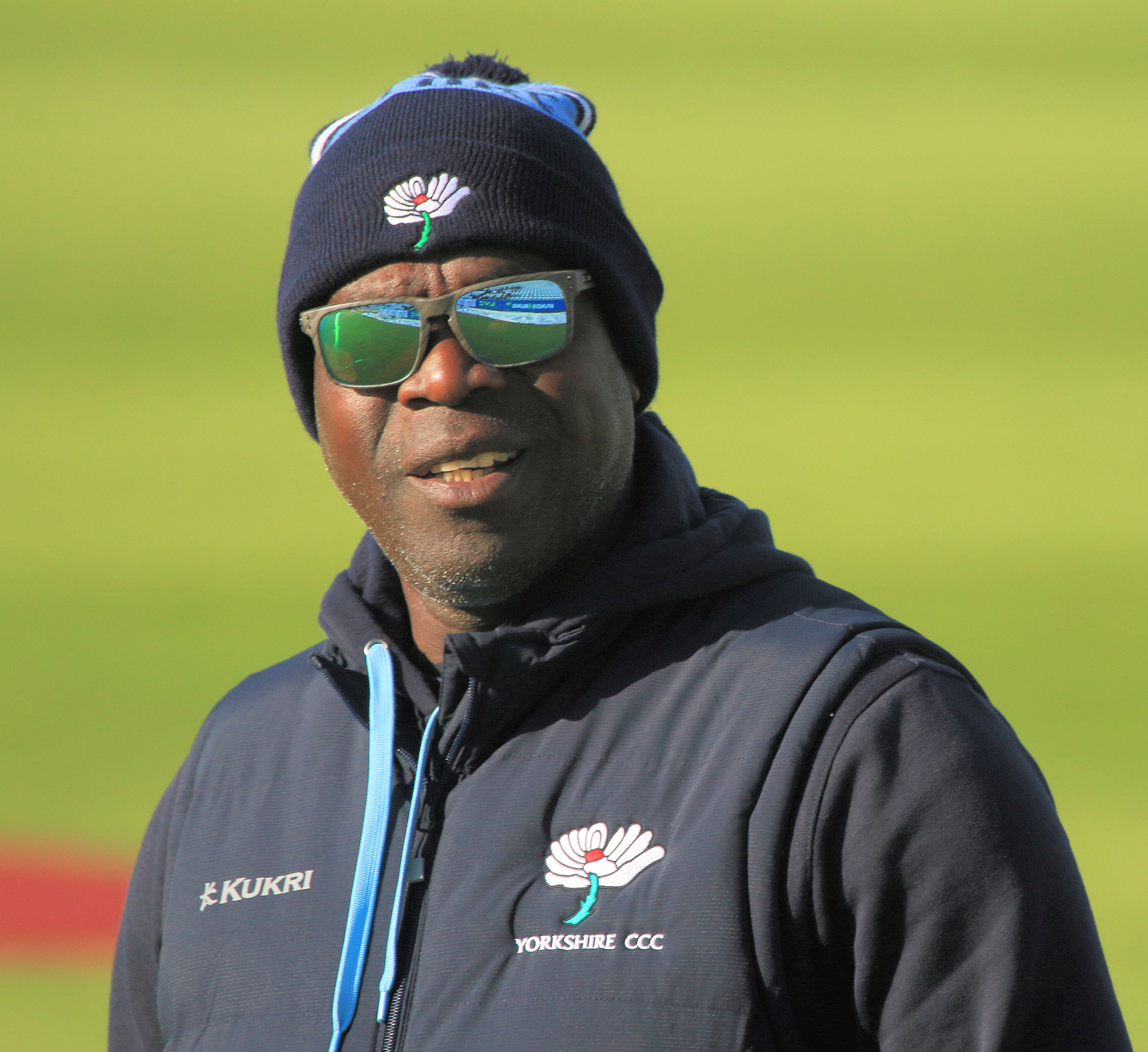
- Gibson in 2023, as coach of Yorkshire

Personal information
- Full name: Ottis Delroy Gibson
- Born: 16 March 1969 (age 57); Saint James, Barbados
- Height: 6 ft 2 in (1.88 m)
- Batting: Right-handed
- Bowling: Right arm fast

International information
- National side: West Indies
- Test debut (cap 210): 22 June 1995 v England
- Last Test: 6 January 1999 v South Africa
- ODI debut (cap 73): 28 May 1995 v England
- Last ODI: 3 May 1997 v India

Domestic team information
- Years: Team
- 1990–1998: Barbados
- 1992/93–1994/95: Border
- 1994–1996: Glamorgan
- 1998/99–1999/00: Griqualand West
- 2000/01: Gauteng
- 2004–2005: Leicestershire
- 2006–2007: Durham

Career statistics
Competition	Test	ODI	FC	LA
Matches	2	15	177	212
Runs scored	93	141	5,604	2,548
Batting average	23.25	14.10	24.25	21.05
100s/50s	0/0	0/1	2/29	1/5
Top score	37	52	155	102*
Balls bowled	472	739	32,441	9,807
Wickets	3	34	659	310
Bowling average	91.66	18.26	27.79	24.30
5 wickets in innings	0	2	28	5
10 wickets in match	0	0	8	0
Best bowling	2/81	5/40	10/47	5/19
Catches/stumpings	0/–	3/–	68/–	59/–
Medal record
Men's cricket
Representing West Indies as Coach
ICC Men's T20 World Cup
Winner	2012 Sri Lanka
- Source: Cricinfo, 15 February 2009

Ottis Delroy Gibson (born 16 March 1969) is a cricket coach and former cricketer from Barbados, who played for the West Indies. From 2010 to 2014, Gibson was the head coach for the West Indies, where he led the team to be champions of the 2012 T20 World Cup. He has been appointed as Bangladesh bowling head coach and previously twice worked as bowling coach for England, from 2007 to 2010 and again from 2015 to 2017. Gibson also coached the South African cricket team from 2017 to 2019. He was the pace bowling coach of the Bangladesh national cricket team and Multan Sultans. In January 2022 Gibson was appointed the head coach of Yorkshire County Cricket Club, he is set to join the team after the conclusion of the 2022 Pakistan Super League season. He was appointed Head Coach of Peshwar Zalmi ahead of Psl 2026. He led Peshawar Zalmi to their title after 9 years.

== Domestic career ==
Gibson's county cricket career saw him play for Glamorgan before taking up coaching with the ECB after a series of niggling injuries. However, he returned to playing with Leicestershire in 2004. In 2006, he moved to Durham. As well as playing for three South African provincial sides, Gibson has also made appearances for Staffordshire.

Gibson signed a two-year contract with Durham in 2006. In his first season, he picked up 48 wickets and recorded a highest first-class score of 155, to keep his side in the division.

On 22 July 2007, he took 10/47 against Hampshire, becoming the 79th bowler in first-class cricket to take 10 wickets in an innings and the first in the County Championship since Richard Johnson in 1994. Hampshire finished 115 all out, but despite Gibson's wickets the match ended in a draw. Gibson's figures are also the second best in the County Championship since 1945 (bettered only by Johnson's).

Later in 2007, Gibson bowled Durham to victory, again against Hampshire, in the Friends Provident Trophy. After setting 312 to win, with Gibson smashing fifteen off just seven balls, the Dynamos bowled out the Hawks for 187. Gibson had Michael Lumb and Sean Ervine caught by Michael Di Venuto first and second ball of the innings respectively, both for 0. He then had Kevin Pietersen out lbw for 12 to leave Hampshire 17–3, finishing with figures of 3-24. He picked up the Player of the Match award for his efforts. Gibson remarked after the game, "Unbelievable. But we've got four games left and if I'm going to get through them I'm going to have to cut down on the celebrations a little bit." Gibson went onto help Durham to second place in the County Championship division 1 that year, the county's highest finish to that point.

== International career ==
Gibson made two Test appearances for the West Indies. In his first outing against England in 1995, he picked up the wickets of Alec Stewart and Darren Gough in the first innings, finishing with figures of 2-81, but was less successful in the second with 0-51. With the bat he made 29 and 14, as the West Indies slumped to a 72-run defeat.

His second appearance came in 1999 against South Africa. He took the wicket of Jacques Kallis in the first innings to end with 1-92, but in the second innings, again finished with 0-51. He made his highest Test score of 37 in the first innings and 13 in the second, South Africa eventually winning by 149 runs.

Gibson was seen primarily as a one-day specialist - "his hard-hitting late middle-order batting was particularly effective in the closing overs of the innings." He played in 15 One Day Internationals, top scoring with 52 against Australia and taking best figures of 5–42 against Sri Lanka. He took another 5 wicket haul against the same opposition and two four-fors, finishing with an impressive bowling average of 18.26.

== Coaching career ==
=== England bowling coach ===
On 20 September 2007, Gibson was appointed as England's bowling coach for the one-day series in Sri Lanka because Allan Donald had commentary duties in South Africa. He had previously worked with Peter Moores at the National Academy during the past two winters. England won the five match ODI series 3–2. The series was low scoring, with England restricting Sri Lanka to 164 and 211 twice in three of the games. At the end of the one-day series in Sri Lanka, Gibson was appointed full-time as England's bowling coach, effectively ending his playing career. England lost the three match Test series 1–0, and although Sri Lanka were once restricted to 188, they also posted scores of 499 and 548.

In 2008, England won the T20I series against New Zealand 2–0. They lost the ODI series 3–1, although this was largely down to poor batting, although New Zealand scored 340 in the fourth match. They won the three match Test series 2-1 and dismissed for New Zealand for 198 and 168 in two of their innings. New Zealand toured England for the return series. New Zealand won the ODI series between the two sides 3–1, although New Zealand were restricted to less than 200 twice. England won the T20 match between the sides as they dismissed New Zealand for just 123.

In July, South Africa toured England for a four-match Test series. England lost 2–1 in a high scoring series, although bowling South Africa out for 194. In the five match ODI series England won 4–0. They put in two excellent bowling performances during the series which included bowling out South Africa for 83 and 170. England then toured India for a five match ODI series, which they lost 5–0. Although England conceded 387 in one game, the rest of the series was fairly low scoring. They went on to lose the two Test series 1–0, with the England bowlers unable to force a win.

England lost the five match ODI series against India 5–0, with the bowlers failing to make much of an impression. India made 387/5 in the first ODI on their way to a convincing victory. Stuart Broad took four wickets in the second game, but on the whole England's bowlers were expensive an uneconomical, as they failed to bowl out India in the series. India won the first Test between the sides, after making 387/4 in their second innings to secure a six wicket victory. The last game of the series ended in a draw with India scoring 453 in their first innings, with Andrew Flintoff taking three wickets, although India secured the series 1–0.

England toured Gibson's native West Indies in 2009, although they lost the five match Test series 1–0. This was down to England's bowlers being unable to dismiss the West Indies cheaply, with the hosts scoring 392, 370 and 749. England were unable to force a win in the final game of the series with the West Indies 114–8. England lost the only T20 match between the two sides. When the West Indies toured England for the return series, England won the Test series 2–0, with the West Indies being dismissed for less than 200 twice. England went on to win the ODI series 2–0, with England bowlers again performing well.

England qualified from the Group stage of the 2009 T20 World Cup, despite losing to the Netherlands. They were knocked out at the Super Eights stage but the bowling remained economical, with only India scoring over 150. They then beat Australia in the Ashes. Although Australia scored 674 in the first Test, the bowling improved and they dismissed Australia for 215 and 160 later on the series to win it 2–1. They lost the one day series 6–1, although Australia only passed 300 once. However, England also only managed to bowl Australia out once.

England reached the semi-finals of the Champions Trophy, but they lost it to Australia with the Australians finishing up on 258–1. Gibson's final tour with England was against South Africa. England won the ODI series 2–1, which included bowling South Africa out for 119. The T20 series finished 1-1, with South Africa posting 241 in the first game. The four-match Test series finished 1-1, with South Africa being bowled out for 133 in the second game to help England win. The series proved to Gibson's last as bowling coach, as it was announced that Gibson would be leaving his England post to take up a new role as head coach of the West Indies.

=== West Indies head coach ===
Gibson's leadership of the West Indies team got off to a bad start after they lost a five-match ODI series against Australia 4–0 and then lost both games of the two-match T20 series. However, the West Indies performed better in their ODI series against Zimbabwe, winning 4–1. Gibson led West Indies into the 2010 T20 World Cup and guided the team into the super eights stage, where they were eliminated. The West Indies endured a nightmare time when South Africa toured, losing the ODI series 5–0, the T20 series 2-0 and the three-match Test series 2–0. They performed better in the longer format of the game against Sri Lanka, earning a 0–0 draw, but lost the ODI series 2–0.

Gibson led the West Indies into the 2011 World Cup, guiding them to the quarter-finals where they lost against Pakistan. When Pakistan toured the West Indies, the two-match Test series ended in a draw. Although the West Indies lost the ODI series 3-2 they won the T20 match between the sides. They then lost the T20 match against India and lost the ODI series 3–2. India also won the Test series 1–0 to ensure they won in all three formats. The West Indies did better against Bangladesh. After drawing the T20 series, they won the ODI series 2-1 and secured a 1–0 victory in the Test series. They again suffered at the hands of India at the end of the year, losing the three-match Test series 2-0 and the ODI series 4–1.

Against Australia they lost the three match 2-0 but improved to draw the ODI series 2-2. In the tour of England, they failed to impress, losing the Test series 2–0, the ODI series 2-0 and the one off T20 match. Their fortunes improved when they played New Zealand at home, as they won the ODI series 4-1 and the Test series 2–0. Their improved from continued when they won the 2012 T20 World Cup. After qualifying from the group despite not winning a game, they won two of their three super eights match to qualify for the semi-finals. Here they beat Australia, before beating Sri Lanka in the final to win the tournament for the first time. They beat Bangladesh 2–0 in a three match Test series, and although they lost the ODI series 3–2, they won the T20 game between the two sides.

In 2013 the West Indies Indies enjoyed a series of emphatic victories over Zimbabwe. They won the ODI series 3–0, the T20 series 2-0 and the two match Test series 2–0. However, they were unable to carry their good from into Champions Trophy as they were eliminated at the Group Stage of the competition. They then played Pakistan in an ODI series at home, but lost the series 3-1 and went on to lose the T20 series 2–0. They then travelled to India where they lost the Test series 2-0 and the ODI series 2–1. They then toured New Zealand but suffered a 3-0 Test series defeat. They also lost the T20 series 2–0, although improved in the ODI series to earn a 2–2 draw.

In 2014 England toured the West Indies for a three-match ODI series, which England won 2–1. However, the West Indies won the T20 series 2–1. The West Indies were unable to defend their T20 World Cup crown. Although they progressed from the super ten stage, winning three of their four matches, they lost out to Sri Lanka in the semi-finals. Gibson's final series came against New Zealand. They lost the Test series 2-1 and drew the T20 series 1-1. Gibson was sacked from his job soon afterwards.

=== Return as England bowling coach ===
Gibson was reappointed England bowling coach for the upcoming West Indies tour on 26 March 2015. After bowling the West Indies out for 295 in their first innings, the England bowlers were unable to force a victory in the second innings. England performed well in the next match, bowling out the West Indies twice to win the match. However, they lost the last match due to a batting collapse and the West Indies won the match by five wickets.

England won the first Test against New Zealand thanks to bowling them out for 220 in their second innings. In the second Test between the two sides England's bowling was less impressive and they eventually went on to lose the game, with New Zealand scoring at a quick run rate. England won the ODI series 3–2, and although New Zealand did post some high scores, England restricted them to just 198 in the first game and 283 in the final game between the sides. Despite the high scores, it was generally accepted that the new look England bowling attack had performed well. England also went on to win the only T20 match between the sides.

Gibson remained as England bowling coach for the Ashes. After England won the first Test, they lost the second by 405 runs. In the third Test England regained the lead with James Anderson taking 6–47 in Australia's first innings and Steven Finn taking 6–79 in their second innings. England's bowlers were instrumental in England winning the fourth Test, with Broad taking 8–15 to help England dismiss Australia for 60 and Ben Stokes taking 6–36 in the second innings as England secured a victory by a margin of an innings and 78 runs. England lost the final match of the series by an innings, but won the series 3–2 to regain the Ashes, largely thanks to impressive bowling from England's bowlers. England restricted Australia to 207 in the third ODI, with Moeen Ali and Liam Plunkett both picking up three wickets, although batsmen on both sides had the better of the series.

Debutant Adil Rashid took 5–64 in the first Test, to dismiss Pakistan for 173 and almost force a win for England. The bowlers struggled throughout the series, restricting Pakistan to under 300 just twice in the series. Despite this, Anderson, Broad and Mark Wood all bowled economically and posed a threat. In the ODI series, Chris Woakes twice took four wickets, taking 4–33 in the second ODI and 4–40 in the third match. In the final match of the series. In the T20I series, England bowled well, with Chris Jordan showing his capabilities as a death bowler when he helped England win the final match of the series following an impressive super over.

England bowled consistently well in the Test series against South Africa, with Broad taking 4-25 and Finn 4-42 as England won the first Test. A less impressive performance followed in the next game as the batsman came out on top. In the third Test, Broad took figures of 6-17 as South Africa were bowled out for just 83 and England went on to win the series 2–1. Following the series, Broad was ranked as the number on Test bowler in the world. In the ODI series, Reece Topley performed well, taking figures of 4–50 in the second ODI and 3–41 in the final match of the series, although South Africa won the series 3–2. In the second T20I, England's bowlers struggled as South Africa played aggressively and the quick bowlers proved ineffective.

England's death bowling was impressive during their World T20 campaign. Although England's bowlers struggled in the match against South Africa, conceding 229 runs, they bounced back and restricted Afghanistan to just 127 to keep their hopes of qualification alive. Jordan was particularly impressive, taking figures of 4–28 against Sri Lanka, while David Willey took 2-26. In the final, England lost the match after Ben Stokes conceded four consecutive sixes in the final over, but on the whole England's bowling had been successful.

England's bowling was impressive against Sri Lanka. Anderson took 10 wickets in the first Test, as Sri Lanka were dismissed for just 91 and 119. England dismissed Sri Lanka for just 101 in the second Test, with strong bowling performances, including the emergence of Woakes, helping them win the series 2–0. England's bowlers restricted Sri Lanka well in the ODI series, with the tourists only passing 300 once. England won the series 3–0, with Rashid and Jason Roy looking dangerous throughout the series. England won the only T20I between the two sides, with Jordan and Liam Dawson helping to bowl Sri Lanka out for just 140.

In the Test series against Pakistan, Woakes in particular impressed with the ball, taking eleven wickets in the opening match of the series. In the third Test, England put on an impressive bowling performance on the final day to dismiss Pakistan on the final day for 201 to win the match. However, in the final match of the series, Pakistan made 542 and were able to level the series at 2-2- with a ten wicket victory. In the ODI series, England restricted Pakistan to below 300 in the four of the five games as they won 4–1. Wood was impressive on his return to the side, and Woakes continued his fine form. England lost the only T20I between the two sides and were not threatening with the ball.

England won the first ODI, with Jake Ball becoming the first England player to take five wickets on their ODI debut. England lost the second game, but won the final game, with Rashid taking four wickets, to win the series 2–1. England won the first Test, with Ben Stokes taking 4–26 in the first innings to help set up and England victory. In the second Test, Moeen Ali took five wickets in Bangladesh's first innings, and Rashid took four wickets in their second innings, but England went on to lose the match to draw the series 1-1.

England had a difficult time with the ball in the Test series against India. In the first Test, Rashid performed well, taking seven wickets in the match. Although Broad took 4/33 in England's second Test defeat, and Ben Stokes 5–73 in the third Test, on the whole England were disappointing, as India passed 400 in each of the first innings. In the final Test, India posted 759/7, as England lost the series 4–0.

England struggled with the ball in the ODI series against India, conceding over 300 in all three games. Woakes took 4–60 in the second match, but the bowlers struggled to be economical, and they lost the series 2–1. England bowled better in the T20I series, restricting India to below 150 in the first two games, with Jordan taking 3–22 in the second T20I. India scored 202/6 in the third match, and England lost the series 2–1.

England performed well with the ball in the ODI series against the West Indies. In the first game they dismissed the West Indies for 251, and in the second they dismissed them for 225. In the final game they bowled them out for 142 on their way to a 3–0 series win, with Woakes and Plunkett bowling particularly well.

=== South Africa head coach ===
Following the announcement that Russell Domingo would not be retained as head coach of South Africa, Gibson accepted a deal in August 2017 to take charge of the Proteas until the 2019 ICC Cricket World Cup. He was well-acquainted with the country and its cricket culture, having played for three sides in the Sunfoil Series during the 1990s, and inherited a team with much talent and promise but also faced with unique challenges, such as government-mandated racial transformation targets and a number of top players leaving for lucrative Kolpak contracts with English counties that rendered them out of the national team picture. In his first series against Bangladesh, Gibson's sides swept all three portions (two Tests, three ODIs, and two Twenty20 matches) with ease, including a record-setting ODI where Hashim Amla and Quinton de Kock combined to chase a total of 281 without losing a wicket and David Miller scoring the fastest century in a T20 international, reaching 100 off just 35 balls. Other highlights included a maiden Test century for highly regarded youngster Aiden Markram, AB de Villiers' highest ODI score of 176, and Kagiso Rabada's 100th Test wicket.

On 30 October 2017, it was decided that Gibson will take over the role of South Africa's fast bowling coach from Charl Langeveldt, with Langeveldt retained as a roving consultant for franchise cricket.

On August 4, 2019, Ottis Gibson and his entire South African coaching team and management lost their jobs, Cricket South Africa (CSA) announced. The decision, taken during a board meeting, follows a disastrous South African World Cup campaign in which the Proteas finished seventh of the 10 teams.

=== Bangladesh Bowling Coach ===
In January 2020, Gibson was named as the fast bowling coach of the Bangladesh cricket team replacing Charl Langeveldt who quit the job to take up a role with the South African national cricket team. Gibson's first international match as the fast bowling coach of Bangladesh came during the 3 match T20I series against Pakistan in February 2020.

Durham Head Coach

On November 20th 2026, Ottis Gibson was announced as the new head coach of Durham County Cricket Club.
