= Nick Speak =

English cricketer (born 1966)

Nicholas Jason Speak (born 21 November 1966) is a former Lancashire and Durham batsman, who played first-class cricket from 1986 to 2001. After a number of years as a regular member of the strong Lancashire team of the early to mid 1990s, he left to join Durham, becoming captain in the 2000 season. He retired after his release from Durham in 2001.

He was born in Manchester. He now lives in Melbourne, Australia and has previously been Assistant Coach/Batting Coach at Melbourne Cricket Club 2008 - 2015, Head Coach at Dandenong Cricket Club 2016 - 2020, and is currently Head Coach at Geelong Cricket Club who play in the VIC Premier Competition, he was also; Assistant Coach of the Cricket Victoria Futures Team 2017/19. and Head Coach of Cricket Victoria Country U19 team who finished runners up in the Cricket Australia U19 National Championships
