= Phil Mustard =

English cricketer

Personal information
- Full name: Philip Mustard
- Born: 9 October 1982 (age 44); Sunderland, Tyne and Wear, England
- Nickname: Colonel
- Height: 5 ft 11 in (1.80 m)
- Batting: Left-handed
- Bowling: Left-arm medium
- Role: Wicket-keeper
- Relatives: Chris Rushworth (cousin); Lee Rushworth (cousin); Haydon Mustard (son)

International information
- National side: England (2007–2008)
- ODI debut (cap 205): 1 October 2007 v Sri Lanka
- Last ODI: 23 February 2008 v New Zealand
- ODI shirt no.: 52
- T20I debut (cap 36): 5 February 2008 v New Zealand
- Last T20I: 7 February 2008 v New Zealand

Domestic team information
- Years: Team
- 2000–2003: Durham Cricket Board
- 2002–2016: Durham (squad no. 19)
- 2011/12: Mountaineers
- 2012–2013: Barisal Burners
- 2012/13: Auckland
- 2014-15: Kalabagan Cricket Academy
- 2015: → Lancashire (on loan)
- 2016: → Gloucestershire (on loan) (squad no. 19)
- 2017: Gloucestershire

Career statistics
| Competition | ODI | T20I | FC | LA |
|---|---|---|---|---|
| Matches | 10 | 2 | 210 | 205 |
| Runs scored | 233 | 60 | 8,700 | 5,484 |
| Batting average | 23.30 | 30.00 | 30.41 | 30.63 |
| 100s/50s | 0/1 | 0/0 | 7/52 | 7/34 |
| Top score | 83 | 40 | 130 | 143 |
| Balls bowled | – | – | 127 | – |
| Wickets | – | – | 1 | – |
| Bowling average | – | – | 150.00 | – |
| 5 wickets in innings | – | – | 0 | – |
| 10 wickets in match | – | – | 0 | – |
| Best bowling | – | – | 1/9 | – |
| Catches/stumpings | 9/2 | 0/0 | 670/19 | 214/48 |
- Source: CricketArchive, 29 September 2017

Philip Mustard (born 8 October 1982) is an English cricketer.

== Background ==
Mustard was educated at Usworth Comprehensive, and is a keen football fan who played at Manchester United until aged 13, and then Middlesbrough FC until aged 15, and he continues to play during the winter months.

== Domestic career ==
Mustard played for Durham and subsequently Gloucestershire, and also represented England. Mustard is a left-handed batsman and wicketkeeper, with a style likened to that of Australia's Adam Gilchrist. Following success for Durham with both gloves and bat, averaging 49.61, and after an injury to England's keeper Matt Prior during the 2007 Twenty20 World Championship, Mustard was called up to the England squad to face Sri Lanka in the winter ODI series. He was named captain of Durham in May 2010.

His nickname, "Colonel", stems from the suspect Colonel Mustard from the murder-mystery board game Cluedo.

== International career ==
Mustard first played for England in the U-19 squad, beginning his cricket career in 2000. He began first-class cricket in 2002 and Twenty20 in 2003 for Durham. During the English winter in 2003, Mustard travelled to Hobart in Tasmania, Australia. He played for the Glenorchy Cricket Club, as well as helping and coaching young and upcoming players. During 2007, he scored nearly 1000 first-class runs and won two trophies. He scored a fast 49 off 38 balls to secure a victory for Durham in September, before being given out lbw. Subsequent replays revealed that the ball would have missed the stumps; however, Mustard's appeals to be allowed to continue were controversially turned down by umpire Ian Gould.

Nevertheless, Mustard's 2007 season earned him a call-up to the England team to replace the injured Prior for England's tour of Sri Lanka at the end of 2007. Mustard received much support for his international call-up, Shane Warne rated Mustard as "the best one-day wicketkeeper-batsman in England" and, along with Paul Collingwood, likened him to Gilchrist in ability. Durham chief executive David Harker stated that Mustard deserved to be called up, stating that his 2007 season was "fantastic".

Mustard had a quiet start to his debut tour, opening the batting and scoring 17 in a warm-up match against a Sri Lanka Cricket XI. This was followed by a more explosive 27 from 17 balls in the first match against the full Sri Lankan team, where England fell to a 119-run defeat, Mustard making the joint-second highest score in the England innings. England won the 3rd ODI by two wickets, but Mustard only scored 14. In the 4th ODI, where England recorded their first series victory in the sub-continent since 1986–87, Mustard was caught and bowled for 19.

During England's tour of New Zealand Mustard opened the batting for the initial two Twenty20 matches. Though falling early in the first, Mustard scored a rapid 40 from 24 balls in the second, and kept wicket in a manner that Jonathan Agnew described as "slick and unfussy." In the 4th ODI on 20 February 2008 he hit a rapid 83, his highest ODI score, as England raced to 340, in a match which was ultimately tied. His final appearance for England was in the 5th ODI, when New Zealand won the series.

== Subsequent career ==
Mustard retired from Gloucestershire after the 2018 season, and signed to play Twenty20 cricket for minor county Northumberland. He played a single game in 2019, but then aspired to develop a career as an umpire, officiating in a minor county match between Cambridgeshire and Norfolk four weeks after his Northumberland match.

Finding work as an umpire at that level not financially rewarding, he also worked part-time for a sports equipment manufacturer and as an ambassador for an energy company.

== Personal life ==
With partner Louise he has two sons. His brother Alan Mustard played for Chester-le-Street CC at Ropery Lane and helped the team win the 45-over National Knockout Competition in 2009 defeating Spencer CC from London in the final at The County Ground in Derby.
