= Durham County Cricket Club =

Cricket club in England

Durham Cricket
- Twenty20 name: Durham

Personnel
- Captain: Alex Lees
- One Day captain: Kasey Aldridge (LA)
- Coach: Ottis Gibson
- Overseas player: David Bedingham

Team information
- Founded: 1882; 144 years ago
- Home ground: Riverside Ground, Chester-le-Street
- Capacity: 15,000

History
- First-class debut: Leicestershire in 1992 at The Racecourse
- Championship wins: 3
- One-Day Cup wins: 2
- Twenty20 Cup wins: 0
- One-Day League (defunct) wins: 0
- Official website: Durham Cricket
First-class
One-day
T20

Durham County Cricket Club (rebranded as Durham Cricket in February 2019) is one of eighteen first-class county clubs within the domestic cricket structure of England and Wales. It represents the historic county of Durham. Founded in 1882, Durham held minor status for over a century and was a prominent member of the Minor Counties Championship, winning the competition seven times. In 1992, the club joined the County Championship and the team was elevated to senior status as an official first-class team. Durham has been classified as an occasional List A team from 1964, then as a full List A team from 1992; and as a senior Twenty20 team since the format's introduction in 2003.

Durham CCC competes in the Rothesay County Championship, the Metro Bank One-Day Cup and in the North Group of the Vitality Blast. They won the County Championship in 2008 for the first time, retained the trophy in the 2009 season, and then won it for a third time in 2013. In one-day competition, they won the 50-over Friends Provident Trophy in 2007 and the inaugural 50-over Royal London One-Day Cup in 2014. Having been relegated from Division One of the County Championship as part of the conditions for a package of financial support from the ECB, Durham played in Division Two of the County Championship from 2017 to 2023, when they won promotion back to Division One.

The club's limited overs kit colours are yellow and blue in the Royal London One-Day Cup, and also yellow and blue colours in the t20 Blast. Durham is currently sponsored by several companies including Emirates and Port of Tyne, as well as 188Bet as their betting partner. The team was sponsored by Northern Rock prior to the bank's nationalisation in 2008. The club is based at the Riverside Ground in Chester-le-Street, which is one of the newest additions to the English Test match circuit, hosting its first match – the second 2003 England v Zimbabwe Test – from 5 to 7 June.

== History ==
=== Earliest cricket in Durham ===
Cricket probably did not reach Durham until the 18th century. The earliest reference is a game at Raby Castle on or soon after 5 August 1751 between the Earl of Northumberland's XI and the Duke of Cleveland's XI. The game was commemorated by a ballad which starts:

Durham City has been dull so long,
No bustle at all to show;
But now the rage of all the throng
Is at cricketing to go.

As it happens, there was a return game soon afterwards at Stanwick, near Richmond, and that is the earliest reference to cricket in Yorkshire.

The first recorded match of representative cricket in the county took place in 1848 at Sunderland, between an All England XII and a Bishopwearmouth 22. Despite their extra numbers the cricketers of Bishopwearmouth were comprehensively outplayed as All England's scores of 129 and 143 dwarfed their own 56 and 59.

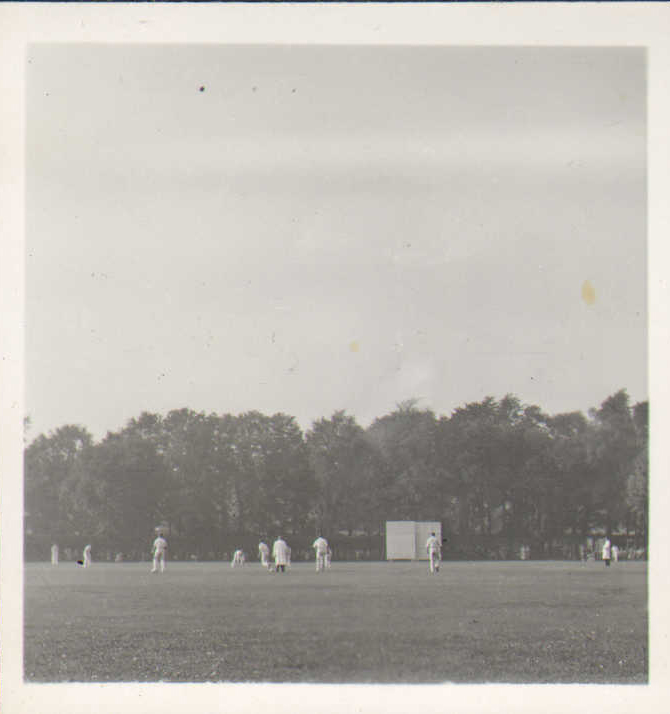
A cricket match being played in Hartlepool, County Durham in 1955

The first team to carry the name of 'Durham County' played an MCC team in 1876 and went on to take on the touring Australians in 1878, winning by 71 runs, and again in 1880, losing by an innings and 38, with the great Fred Spofforth taking 17 wickets for 66.

=== Origin of club ===
Durham CCC was founded as an official entity on 23 May 1882, and the nascent club played its first competitive match on 12 June of that year, beating Northumberland by 4 wickets at the Ashbrooke Ground, Sunderland.

The club established an enviable record as a minor county: becoming the first minor county to beat a first-class county in the Gillette Cup (defeating Yorkshire in round one in 1973, and then in 1985 beating Derbyshire at the same stage); winning the Minor Counties Championship a record-equalling seven times between 1901 and 1984; and putting together a record of 65 matches without defeat between 1976 and 1982 that remains unbroken.

=== Durham as a first-class county ===
==== 1989 - 2005 ====
Durham County Cricket Club former logo.

Early in 1989, the club began the process of applying to become a first-class cricketing county and join the County Championship. First-class status was awarded on 6 December 1991, with Durham becoming the first new first-class county for 70 years. Their first season in the County Championship was the 1992 season.

For over a decade after gaining their status, Durham were not distinguished by marked success as a first-class county. In the 2004 season they finished bottom of the two-division County Championship, sixth out of ten teams in the one-day National Cricket League and fifth out of six teams in the Northern Division of the Twenty20 Cup.

However, in 2005 under the captaincy of Australian Mike Hussey Durham finished second and achieved promotion in both the County Championship and the one-day National Cricket League.

==== 2006 - 2015: One Day Trophy and County Championship victories ====
Hussey was prevented from returning to the Riverside in 2006 as he was contracted to the Australian international team; and with vice-captain Paul Collingwood away on English international team duty Dale Benkenstein was captain for 2006.

Durham had mixed success in the 2006 season, finishing second in the North Division of the C&G Trophy. However, Durham were poor in the Twenty20 cup, finishing last in the North Division and only managing 2 victories, both against Lancashire. The Pro40 campaign started fairly well, with Durham taking 4 points from the first 4 games with a win, a loss, a tie and a no result. However, several defeats left them needing a win against the champions elect, Essex, in the final game of the season. They managed the victory, but other results did not go their way and they ended up being relegated in 8th place. The Championship season also began with success, but mediocre results in the middle of the season left Durham hanging above the relegation zone by just half a point going into the last game of the season. Durham needed more points than their rivals Yorkshire, but looked in trouble when Darren Lehmann hit a career-best 339 in the first innings. Achieving just one bowling bonus point meant that Durham needed to score 400 without losing more than 5 wickets and then draw the game.

However, one other team could also be relegated. Nottinghamshire needed just 3 points to avoid the drop at the start of the matches, but only managed 1 point as they were soundly beaten by Sussex. This meant that Durham needed only to score 400 (for maximum batting points) and force a draw. At 191–6 this looked unlikely. But a record-breaking stand of 315 between Benkenstein and Ottis Gibson made it possible. Gibson was out for 155, the highest first-class score in his career. Durham then collapsed again to 518 all out, needing work to be done in the second innings. This was provided by Garry Park, who hit a maiden first-class century (100*) as Durham played out a draw, leaving themselves and Yorkshire in the first division.

Until the 2014 season the team was known as Durham Dynamos in limited overs tournaments.

During the 2007 season the club won its first major trophy, the Friends Provident Trophy, by beating the 2005 winners Hampshire Hawks in a game which started on 18 finishing a day later due to rain. The toss between Dale Benkenstein and Shane Warne was won by the latter who sent Durham into bat. Fellow Aussie Michael Di Venuto and wicket-keeper Phil Mustard opened the batting. Mustard looked strong from ball 1 but Di Venuto was a little shaky and was dismissed by Hampshire's West Indies international Daren Powell and caught by Michael Carberry. Ex-Scotland u-19 captain Kyle Coetzer and Shiv Chanderpaul made significant contributions (61 and 78 respectively), the latter being run-out. Captain Benkenstein made a quickfire 61 off 43 deliveries. Durham finished their innings on 312–5.

Michael Lumb and ex-captain John Crawley opened for the Hawks, the former departing for a golden duck, caught at second slip by Di Venuto. Zimbabwean Sean Ervine was next in, immediately edging to second slip in identical fashion leaving Ottis Gibson on a hat-trick. Kevin Pietersen survived that ball, but was soon back in the pavilion with 12. John Crawley managed a resilient 68 but was bowled by Paul Collingwood who was to finish with 3–33. The rain came down and play was delayed until the following day.

With the fall of Nic Pothas (47) and Dimitri Mascarenhas (12) the tail was exposed and was quickly disposed of with Hampshire finishing on 187, handing Durham a historic win. Veteran Ottis Gibson was named man of the match for his spell of 3–24 at the start of the Hampshire innings, which included wickets with his first two deliveries.

In September 2008, Durham claimed their first County Championship by winning their final match of the season at Canterbury, against Kent. Durham won the match by an innings, condemning Kent to be relegated, and moving eight points clear of runners up, Nottinghamshire.

Twelve months later, Durham retained their County Championship title defeating Nottinghamshire by an innings and 52 runs at the Riverside Ground.

In September 2013 Durham won the County Championship for a third time after beating Nottinghamshire by eight wickets at Chester le Street.

Durham won the 2014 One-Day Cup, defeating Warwickshire by three wickets in the final at Lord's on 20 September 2014.

During this period of success Durham saw a number of homegrown players go on to make an impact on the England side. Players such as Paul Collingwood (who was the first Durham CCC player to hit a Test century and double century and captained England to victory at the 2010 ICC World Twenty20), Steve Harmison, Liam Plunkett, Graham Onions, Ben Stokes (who became England Test captain in 2022) and Mark Wood formed part of successful England sides of the 21st Century, including the 2005 Ashes series, 2009 Ashes series, 2010 ICC World Twenty20, 2010–11 Ashes series and 2015 Ashes series. Other Durham players to feature for England during this time included Phil Mustard, Scott Borthwick, Keaton Jennings and Mark Stoneman.

==== 2016 - 2022: Financial issues and relegation ====
Following a series of financial "bailout" payments made by the England and Wales Cricket Board to Durham during the 2016 season, the county, which had finished fourth in Division One at the end of the season, were relegated to Division Two in place of the eighth place team, Hampshire. Durham were also placed under a salary cap administered by the ECB until 2020 and started the 2017 Championship season with a deduction of 48 points. The club's eligibility to bid to stage Test cricket at the Riverside Ground was also removed although club will still be eligible to bid to host one-day and Twenty20 international matches.

The decision led to a number of first team players leaving the club, including Borthwick and Stoneman (to Surrey) and Jennings (to Lancashire). However, some players who left following the relegation would later return as the club rebuilt, including Borthwick, Ben Raine and Paul Coughlin.

Ben Stokes and Mark Wood were part of the England team which won the 2019 Cricket World Cup, with Stokes playing a starring role in the final in which he was named man of the match. The Riverside Ground hosted 3 games of the tournament.

Durham reached the final of the 2021 One-Day Cup but lost by 58 runs in the final to Glamorgan.

Stokes and Wood were also part of the England squad which won the 2022 ICC Men's T20 World Cup. Other Durham players to earn England call ups in these years included Alex Lees, Matthew Potts and Brydon Carse.

On 28 April 2022, Stokes was named as England's new Test captain, replacing Joe Root.

On 6 May 2022, in Stokes' first match since becoming England's captain, he hit 17 sixes against Worcestershire, setting a new record for sixes hit in a single innings of a match in the County Championship. Stokes scored 161 runs from 88 balls, which included the fastest century in first-class cricket by a Durham player.

==== 2023 - present: Return to Division One and another relegation ====
In December 2022, former Australia cricketer and Netherlands cricket team coach Ryan Campbell was appointed head coach of Durham on a three-year contract to the end of the 2025 season, succeeding James Franklin. Under Campbell Durham won the 2023 Division Two title to secure a return to Division One for the first time since the 2016 relegation. They were relegated back to Division Two in 2025 after a batting collapse on the final day of the season saw them lose to Yorkshire when a draw would have been enough to avoid the drop.

== Ground history ==
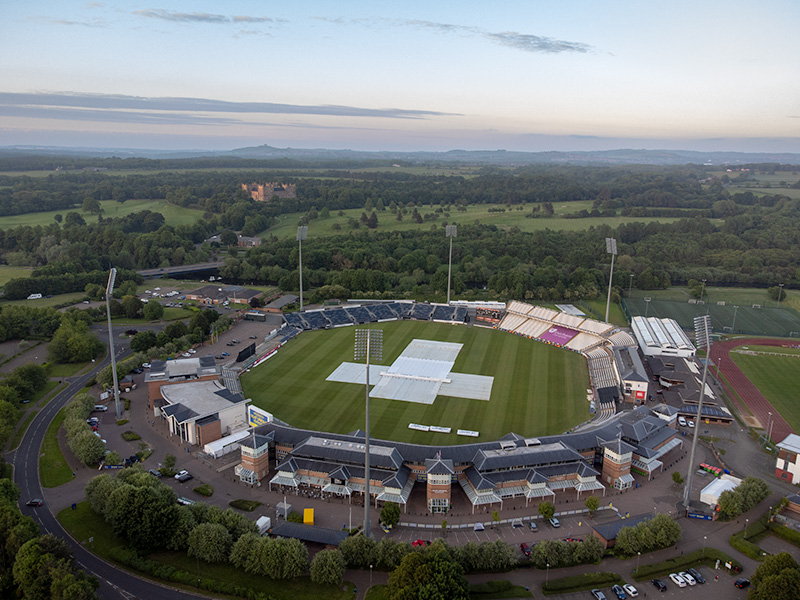
The Riverside Ground, Chester-le-Street. Lumley Castle can be seen in the background

The club's acceptance into first-class cricket was made conditional on the building of a new Test match-standard cricket ground. Work began on the new ground at the Riverside, a spectacular location overlooked by Lumley Castle, in 1990, and the ground hosted its first game, Durham v Warwickshire, on 18 May 1995.

Development of the Riverside Ground has continued until the present day, and in 2003 the Riverside Ground was raised to Test match status. The ground has been used for six England Test matches, against Zimbabwe in 2003, Bangladesh in 2005, two against West Indies in June 2007 and May 2009, an Ashes Test Match against Australia in 2013, and against Sri Lanka in 2016. England have won all six of these tests.

As part of the conditions of a package of financial support announced in October 2016, the ECB imposed a number of sanctions on Durham County Cricket Club, including removal of the club's eligibility to bid to stage Test cricket at the Riverside Ground. The club will still be eligible to bid to host one-day and Twenty20 international matches.

The Riverside hosted 3 games of the 2019 Cricket World Cup. In 2026, Durham returned to using outground venues in Darlington and Gosforth, Newcastle.

This following table gives details of every venue at which Durham have hosted a first-class or List A cricket match:

Name of ground	Location	Year	FC matches	LA matches	T20 matches	Total
Riverside Ground	Chester-le-Street	1995–present	182	176	70	428
Feethams	Darlington	1964–2003,2026	10	14	0	24
Grangefield Road	Stockton-on-Tees	1992–2006	12	11	0	23
The Racecourse	Durham City	1992–1994	8	7	0	15
Park Drive	Hartlepool	1992–2000	8	9	0	17
Ropery Lane	Chester-le-Street	1967–1994	3	7	0	10
Eastwood Gardens	Gateshead Fell	1992–1994	4	3	0	7
Roseworth Terrace	Gosforth^{1}	2014–2016,2026	0	2	0	2
Green Lane	Durham City	1979	0	1	0	1
Osborne Avenue	Jesmond^{1}	1992	0	1	0	1
Source: cricketarchive Updated: 5 October 2016

- Located in Newcastle upon Tyne, historically part of Northumberland.

== Players ==
Since Durham's induction as a first-class county, each player has been allocated a unique squad number. The first 11 numbers were allocated in batting order from the club's first game, and subsequent numbers have been allocated in order of appearance.

=== Current squad ===
- No. denotes the player's squad number, as worn on the back of their shirt.
- ‡ denotes players with international caps.

No.	Name	Nat	Birth date	Batting style	Bowling style	Notes
Batsmen
5	David Bedingham ‡	South Africa	22 April 1994 (age 32)	Right-handed	—	Overseas player
7	Graham Clark	England	16 March 1993 (age 33)	Right-handed	Right-arm leg-break	
9	Ben McKinney	England	4 October 2004 (age 22)	Left-handed	Right-arm off break	England development contract
15	Will Rhodes	England	2 March 1995 (age 31)	Left-handed	Right-arm medium	
19	Alex Lees ‡	England	14 April 1993 (age 33)	Left-handed	Right-arm leg-break	Club captain
24	Emilio Gay ‡	England (Note: Gay has also played international cricket for Italy.)	14 April 2000 (age 26)	Left-handed	Right-arm medium	England central contract
48	Colin Ackermann ‡	Netherlands	4 April 1991 (age 35)	Right-handed	Right-arm off break	
—	Luke Symington	England	22 February 2008 (age 18)	Left-handed	Right-arm medium	
All-rounders
38	Ben Stokes ‡	England	4 June 1991 (age 35)	Left-handed	Right-arm fast-medium	
44	Ben Raine	England	14 September 1991 (age 35)	Left-handed	Right-arm fast-medium	
55	Kasey Aldridge	England	24 December 2000 (age 25)	Right-handed	Right-arm fast-medium	Captain (List A)
—	Luc Benkenstein	South Africa	2 November 2004 (age 22)	Right-handed	Right-arm leg break	UK passport
Wicket-keepers
21	Ollie Robinson	England	1 December 1998 (age 27)	Right-handed	—	
52	Haydon Mustard	England	12 July 2006 (age 20)	Right-handed	Right-arm medium	
—	Robbie Bowman	England	14 July 2007 (age 19)	Right-handed	—	
Bowlers
11	Shafiqullah Ghafari	Afghanistan	8 October 2001 (age 25)	Right-handed	Right-arm leg break	Domestic player
12	Luke Robinson	England	12 October 2003 (age 23)	Left-handed	Right-arm fast-medium	
17	Callum Parkinson	England	24 October 1996 (age 30)	Right-handed	Slow left-arm orthodox	
22	Daniel Hogg	England	19 December 2004 (age 21)	Right-handed	Right-arm fast-medium	
28	Archie Bailey	England	28 June 2005 (age 21)	Right-handed	Right-arm fast-medium	
33	Mark Wood ‡	England	11 January 1990 (age 36)	Right-handed	Right-arm fast	
35	Matthew Potts ‡	England	29 October 1998 (age 28)	Right-handed	Right-arm fast-medium	England central contract
59	Sam Conners	England	13 February 1999 (age 27)	Right-handed	Right-arm fast-medium	
77	James Minto	England	26 November 2007 (age 18)	Left-handed	Left-arm fast-medium	
99	Brydon Carse ‡	England	31 July 1995 (age 31)	Right-handed	Right-arm fast-medium	England central contract
—	Charlie Harmison	England	15 February 2008 (age 18)	Right-handed	Right-arm fast-medium	
Source: Updated: 27 September 2026

== Lists of players and club captains ==
- List of Durham CCC players
- List of Durham cricket captains

=== Durham players with international caps ===
Durham county cricketers who have during their career also represented their national team in Test cricket or One Day International cricket.

England

- (England) Ian Blackwell
- (England) Scott Borthwick
- (England) Ian Botham
- (England) Simon Brown
- (England) Brydon Carse
- (England) Paul Collingwood
- (England) Geoff Cook
- (England) Graeme Fowler
- (Scotland) (England) Gavin Hamilton (Note: Hamilton represented both Scotland and England in international cricket.)
- (England) Steve Harmison
- (England) Keaton Jennings
- (England) Wayne Larkins
- (England) Alex Lees
- (England) John Morris
- (England) Phil Mustard
- (England) Graham Onions
- (England) Paul Parker
- (England) Liam Plunkett
- (England) Matthew Potts
- (England) Martin Saggers
- (England) Ben Stokes
- (England) Mark Stoneman
- (England) Vince Wells
- (England) Mark Wood

Australia

- (Australia) Cameron Bancroft
- (Australia) David Boon
- (Australia) (Italy) Michael Di Venuto (Note: Di Venuto represented both Australia and Italy in international cricket.)
- (Australia) John Hastings
- (Australia) Brad Hodge
- (Australia) Michael Hussey
- (Australia) Dean Jones
- (Australia) Simon Katich
- (Australia) Mick Lewis
- (Australia) Martin Love
- (Australia) Jimmy Maher
- (Australia) Ashley Noffke
- (Australia) Marcus North
- (Australia) D'Arcy Short
- (Australia) Shaun Tait
- (Australia) David Warner
- (Australia) Brad Williams

Canada

- (Barbados) (Canada) Anderson Cummins (Note: Cummins represented both the West Indies and Canada in international cricket.)

India

- (India) Varun Aaron
- (India) Axar Patel
- (India) Manoj Prabhakar
- (India) Javagal Srinath

Ireland

- (Ireland) Peter Chase
- (Ireland) Barry McCarthy
- (Ireland) Stuart Poynter

Italy

- (Australia) (Italy) Michael Di Venuto (Note: Di Venuto represented both Australia and Italy in international cricket.)

Netherlands

- (Netherlands) Brandon Glover
- (Netherlands) Bas de Leede
- (Netherlands) Paul van Meekeren

New Zealand

- (New Zealand) Nathan Astle
- (New Zealand) Tom Latham
- (New Zealand) Ajaz Patel
- (New Zealand) Scott Styris
- (New Zealand) Ross Taylor
- (New Zealand) Paul Wiseman
- (New Zealand) Will Young

Pakistan

- (Pakistan) Shoaib Akhtar

Scotland

- (Scotland) James Brinkley
- (Scotland) Kyle Coetzer
- (Scotland) (England) Gavin Hamilton (Note: Hamilton represented both Scotland and England in international cricket.)
- (Scotland) Michael Jones
- (Scotland) Calum MacLeod
- (Scotland) Gavin Main
- (Scotland) Moneeb Iqbal

South Africa

- (South Africa) David Bedingham
- (South Africa) Dale Benkenstein
- (South Africa) Stephen Cook
- (South Africa) Herschelle Gibbs
- (South Africa) Neil McKenzie
- (South Africa) Aiden Markram
- (South Africa) David Miller
- (South Africa) Albie Morkel
- (South Africa) Dewald Pretorius
- (South Africa) Imran Tahir

Sri Lanka

- (Sri Lanka) Kumar Sangakkara

West Indies

- (Jamaica) Gareth Breese
- (Barbados) Sherwin Campbell
- (Guyana) Shivnarine Chanderpaul
- (Barbados) (Canada) Anderson Cummins (Note: Cummins represented both the West Indies and Canada in international cricket.)
- (Barbados) Ottis Gibson
- (Guyana) Reon King

Zimbabwe

- (Zimbabwe) Andy Blignaut

== Honours ==
=== First XI honours ===
- County Championship: 3
  - 2008, 2009, 2013

Division Two (2) - 2023, 2026

- Gillette/NatWest/C&G/Friends Provident Trophy: 1
  - 2007
- Royal London One-Day Cup: 1
  - 2014
- Sunday League/Pro 40/National League (2nd Division): 1
  - 2007
- Zimbabwean Domestic Twenty20: 1
  - 2024
- Minor Counties Championship: 7
  - 1895 (shared), 1900 (shared), 1901, 1926, 1930, 1976, 1980, 1981, 1984
- MCCA Knockout Trophy: 1
  - 1985

=== Second XI honours ===
- Second XI Championship: 3
  - 2008, 2016, 2018
- Second XI Trophy: 0

== See also ==
- Durham County Cricket Club seasons
- Dynamo (disambiguation)
- Durham County Football Association

== External sources ==
- Official Durham County Cricket Club website
- BBC Wear – Riverside Cricket Ground interactive 360° Panorama
- BBC Wear – DCCC celebrate with the County Championship Trophy 2008
- Scorecard from the 2007 Friends Provident Trophy Final
